= Ken Taggart Memorial Trophy and Memorial Bowl =

The Ken Taggart Memorial Trophy and Ken Taggart Memorial Bowl are trophies awarded to the winners of the play-off competitions in the National Ice Hockey League (NIHL) first and second divisions, in the third and fourth levels of the sport in the United Kingdom. Named after Ken Taggart, an American-born player and official who worked in the UK, the Memorial Trophy is fought between the winners of the Division 1 North and Division 1 South play-offs, and the Memorial Bowl between the winners of the Division 2 North and Division 2 South play-offs. The competition first took place during the 2024-25 season, with Billingham Stars winning the Memorial Trophy, and Peterborough Phantoms winning the Memorial Bowl.

== History ==
The competition first took place on 13 April 2025 at the Bauer Arena in IceSheffield in Sheffield, South Yorkshire, England. The teams taking part were decided the previous day, the contest being thought between the winners of the four play-off competitions held in each of the regional leagues. These being Division 1 North (Moralle League), Division 1 South (Britton League), Division 2 North (Laidier League) and Division 2 South (Wilkinson League).

The winners of these four competitions Billingham Stars, who defeated Blackburn Hawks 6-3; Slough Jets, beating Streatham Redhawks 6-0; Telford Tigers 2, winning against Sutton Sting 6-3; and Peterborough Phantoms 2, who were victorious against Guildford Phoenix 4-3 after a shootout went to the tenth round.

=== Memorial Trophy ===
The Memorial Trophy was won by Billingham Stars, who defeated Slough Jets in overtime 5-4, with Roland Gritans scoring the winning goal. The win was the fourth trophy won by Billingham that season, having also won the Division 1 North league, the Moralle Cup and the play-off needed to reach the Memorial Trophy final. Billingham and Slough then played in the NIHL Division 1 Championship final on 20 April 2025, with both teams having won their respective leagues that season. Slough won 6-1.

=== Memorial Bowl ===
The Memorial Bowl was won by Peterborough Phantoms 2, who beat Telford Tigers 2 9-8. It was the fourth trophy won by Peterborough in the 2024-25 season, who had also won the Eddie Johnson Memorial Cup final, the Wilkinson Cup and the play-off required to reach the Memorial Bowl final.
