= Widnes Wild =

- City: Widnes, England
- League: NIHL
- Division: Division One North
- Founded: 2013
- Home arena: Planet Ice Widnes; Capacity: 500; Ice size: 56m x 28m
- Colours: Black, Gold & White
- Owners: North West Winter Sports Club, Chairman; Matt Lloyd (Paralympian)
- General manager: Jon Anderson
- Head coach: Richard Haggar
- Affiliates: Widnes Wild Women, WNIHL 2
- Farm club: Widnes Junior Wild
- Website: http://www.widneswild.co.uk/

The Widnes Wild are an English ice hockey team from the town of Widnes. They were formed in 2013. They currently compete in the Moralee Conference of the English Ice Hockey Association National Ice Hockey League (North).

== League history ==
Season	Position	Wins	Draws	Losses	±
2013-14	5	11	1	16	-50
2014-15	4	20	2	14	37
2015-16	2	19	3	6	86
2016-17	2	20	4	4	59
2017-18	2	23		9	82
2018-19	1	28		4	140
2019-20	4	15		7	51

== Club roster 2022-23 ==
(*) Denotes a non-British trained player (Import)

Netminders
No.	Nat.	Player	Catches	Date of birth	Place of birth	Acquired	Contract
35	(England)	Evan Coles	L	13 February 2000 (age 25)	Sheffield, England	2021 from Bradford Bulldogs	Two-Way
39	(England)	Miles Finney	L	16 October 1993 (age 32)	England	2022 from Sheffield Steeldogs	22/23
	(England)	Jake Lowndes		2002 (age 20)	England	2022	22/23

Defencemen
No.	Nat.	Player	Shoots	Date of birth	Place of birth	Acquired	Contract
5	(England)	Rhys Edwards	L	4 June 2006 (age 19)	England	2022 from Bradford Bulldogs	Two-Way
15	(England)	Lee Kemp	L	18 January 1988 (age 38)	Nottingham, England	2015	22/23
18	(England)	Jonathon Williamson	L	1994 (age 28)	England	2022 from Altrincham Aces	22/23
20	(Wales)	Bez Hughes	R	2 May 1995 (age 30)	Wrexham, Wales	2016 from Telford Tigers NIHL	22/23
71	(England)	Jack Murray		23 May 2001 (age 24)	Blackpool, England	2021 from Blackburn Hawks	22/23
84	(England)	Thomas Jackson	R	21 May 1995 (age 30)	Glossop, England	2014 from Hull Jets	22/23
86	(England)	Kieron Furlong		2002 (age 20)	England	2021 from Hull Jets	22/23
91	(England)	Calum Ruddick	L	19 December 1990 (age 35)	Manchester, England	2022 from Blackburn Hawks	22/23

Forwards
No.	Nat.	Player	Shoots	Date of birth	Place of birth	Acquired	Contract
9	(England)	Ken Armstrong	R	14 June 1985 (age 40)	Sale, England	2013 from Blackburn Eagles	22/23
10	(England)	Nathan Britton	R	20 March 1993 (age 32)	Sheffield, England	2021 from Sheffield Senators	22/23
14	(England)	Joe Wyatt		1990 (age 32)	England	2021 from Altrincham Aces	22/23
16	(England)	Michael Gilbert		1997 (age 25)	England	2017 from Altrincham Aces	22/23
17	(Northern Ireland)	Andrew Hopkins		1997 (age 25)	Northern Ireland	2022 from Altrincham Aces	22/23
19	(England)	Richard Haggar	R	26 January 1991 (age 35)	Hull, England	2021 from Hull Jets	22/23
23	(England)	Josh Reynolds		2002 (age 20)	England	2022 from Bradford Bulldogs	22/23
24	(Slovakia)	Adam Jasečko	L	13 September 2004 (age 21)	Spisska Nova Ves, Slovakia	2022 from Hull Jets	Two-Way
44	(Germany)	Daniel Haid		2 December 1993 (age 32)	Bietigheim-Bissingen, Germany	2019 from Chemnitz Crashers	22/23
63	(Scotland)	Joe Coulter	R	12 June 1995 (age 30)	Dumfries, Scotland	2022 from Leeds Knights	22/23
89	(England)	Matthew Barlow	L	1999 (age 23)	Partington, England	2021 from Bradford Bulldogs	22/23
94	(England)	Joe Greaves	L	17 July 1992 (age 33)	Royton, England	2021 from Blackburn Hawks	22/23

Team Staff
No.	Nat.	Name	Acquired	Role	Place of birth	Joined from
19	(England)	Richard Haggar	2020/21	Player-Coach	Hull, England
	(England)	Jason Coles	2021/22	Assistant coach	England
	(England)	Mark Gillingham	2013/14	Assistant coach	Blackpool, England	Fylde Flyers, NIHL 2
	(England)	Jon Anderson	2015/16	General Manager	Widnes, England
	(England)	Louis Rosslyn	2021/22	Equipment Manager	England

== 2021/22 Outgoing ==
Outgoing
No.	Nat.	Player	Shoots	Date of birth	Place of birth	Leaving For
4	(England)	Tom Brierley	R	26 October 1989 (age 36)	Cleethorpes, England	Hull Jets, NIHL 2
13	(Latvia)	Vladislavs Vulkanovs	R	28 February 1998 (age 27)	Ventspils, Latvia	Sheffield Steeldogs, NIHL National
28	(England)	Chris Wilcox	R	25 December 1986 (age 39)	Solihull, England	Hull Seahawks, NIHL National
32	(England)	Harrison Walker	L	25 June 2002 (age 23)	Bradford, England	Leeds Knights, NIHL National
56	(England)	Tom Stubley	R	30 November 1998 (age 27)	York, England	Hull Seahawks, NIHL National
