= Bristol Pitbulls =

- City: Bristol, England
- League: NIHL
- Division: National League
- Founded: 2009
- Home arena: Planet Ice Bristol (capacity: 1,300)
- Colors: White, blue, navy
- Owner: Richie Hargreaves
- Head coach: Aleš Padělek
- Captain: Josh Batch
- Affiliates: Cardiff Devils, EIHL; Bristol Pitbulls 2, NIHL 2
- Website: bristolpitbulls.co.uk

Franchise history
- 2009 – present: Bristol Pitbulls

Championships
- Regular season titles: 2009–10 (ENL 2), 2014–15 (NIHL 2)
- Playoff championships: 2014–15 (NIHL 2)

The Bristol Pitbulls are an ice hockey team based in Bristol, England, currently playing in the National Ice Hockey League (NIHL) National League, the second tier of ice hockey in England. The team plays its home games at Planet Ice Bristol in Cribbs Causeway.

They were founded in 2009, based at the Bristol Ice Rink. Following the closure of the rink in 2012, the team played their home games at the Oxford Ice Rink until October 2021, when the team returned to Bristol, at the newly built Planet Ice rink at Cribbs Causeway. The team began in the English National Ice Hockey League (ENL) division two in the 2009–10 season, which they won, and were promoted. When ice hockey in the United Kingdom was restructured in 2012–13, they moved into the National Ice Hockey League (NIHL) division two, which they won in 2014–15. They later moved into NIHL 1 in 2021–22 and the NIHL National League in 2022–23, where they have remained since.

== Current roster ==
Goaltenders
No.	Nationality	Name	Birth date and age	Catches	Notes
89	USA	Tommy Nappier	June 22, 1998 (age 27)	Left	Import
44	WAL	Ben Scanlan	March 10, 2002 (age 24)	Left	Two-way with Cardiff Fire
34	WAL	Harry Thomas	July 28, 2008 (age 17)	Left	Two-way with Cardiff Devils

Defence
No.	Nationality	Name	Birth date and age	Shoots	Notes
41	ENG	Josh Batch (C)	January 15, 1991 (age 35)	Left	
24	CAN	Tanner Butler (A)	August 3, 1993 (age 32)	Left	Import
18	WAL	Lee Duance	April 29, 1990 (age 35)	Right	
71	SCO	Jay King (A)	February 1, 1996 (age 30)	Right	
29	SCO	Calum McGill	July 19, 2003 (age 22)	Right	
73	WAL	Sam Smith	September 2, 2001 (age 24)	Right	
13	WAL	Dylan Webb	July 20, 2004 (age 21)	–	Two-way with Bristol Pitbulls 2
23	ENG	Jacob White-Sey	June 15, 2005 (age 20)	Left	

Forwards
No.	Nationality	Name	Birth date and age	Shoots	Notes
26	CAN	Jake Bricknell	July 15, 1997 (age 28)	Right	Import
14	ENG	Jacob Bryceland	March 16, 2004 (age 22)	Left	Two-way with Cardiff Devils
10	CAN	John Dunbar	August 24, 1991 (age 34)	Right	Import
7	NIR	Cameron Hamill	September 28, 2004 (age 21)	Left	
77	WAL	Bayley Harewood	July 7, 2003 (age 22)	Right	Two-way with Cardiff Devils
91	ENG	Mason Lipsey	October 2, 2001 (age 24)	–	
4	WAL	Joseph Malfatti	June 14, 2009 (age 16)	Right	Junior
11	ENG	Sean Morris (A)	April 11, 2003 (age 22)	Right	
63	CZE	Aleš Padělek	March 4, 1980 (age 46)	Left	Head coach; import
96	WAL	Joshua Poole	February 29, 2008 (age 18)	–	Junior
90	WAL	Bobby Ragan	October 10, 2006 (age 19)	Right	
92	SCO	Caly Robertson	November 2, 2000 (age 25)	Left	
72	ENG	Owen Smetham	August 23, 2005 (age 20)	Left	
6	ENG	Rhys Smetham	August 26, 2003 (age 22)	Left	
81	ENG	Maximilian Wigfield	December 11, 1999 (age 26)	Right	

== History ==
=== Background ===
Bristol hadn't had an ice hockey team in the British senior leagues since the Bristol Bulldogs had folded after just one season in 1993. However, the Bristol Junior Ice Hockey Club had remained in place and was still producing players who would go on to play for senior teams elsewhere in the country.

One of those players was Richie Hargreaves, who had spent his career playing for teams in Cardiff, Swindon, Isle of Wight, Basingstoke, Slough and London. In the summer of 2008, Hargreaves initially decided to take some time away from playing with a view to setting up a senior team in Bristol the following season. However, due to the sacking of the coach at his brother Mike's team, the Oxford City Stars, Hargreaves was persuaded to continue playing, in addition to becoming a head coach for the first time, whilst working on his plans for the team that would become the Bristol Pitbulls.

On 13 December, a trial game against the Vectis Tigers was put on in Bristol Ice Rink to test the viability of running a senior team in the rink. Bristol won the game 13–9 in front of a crowd of 350. The evening was regarded as a success, and so a decision was taken to apply to put a team into the senior leagues for the 2009–10 season.

Initially, the English Ice Hockey Association offered the opportunity for the team to go straight into ENL South Division 1. However, with a lack of local players ready to play at that level, Hargreaves opted to start in Division 2, deciding that his team "wasn't ready" and that "building a strong franchise and fan-base were the most important objectives for the first year."

=== Inaugural season ===
Hargreaves spent the summer recruiting players for the team. With few local, experienced players, a result from the 16-year absence of senior hockey in the city, the team was largely filled with players from Bristol's u18 and rec teams, along with inline hockey players from the region.

The Bristol Pitbulls played their first official game in a pre-season friendly at Bristol Ice Rink against Hargreaves' old club, the Oxford City Stars on 29 August 2009. While Bristol failed to win that game, and the return leg in Oxford the following night, the experience helped make sure the team were more ready for the start of the season.

Bristol's first competitive game saw the Vectis Tigers, now re-branded as the Wightlink Tigers, return to the city for an ENL2 Cup First Round match. A 9–3 win for Bristol set the tone for the season, as Pitbulls went on to lose only six times in their 32 games across both league and cup competitions.

It was the league which saw the team win their first title, after coming out top in a season-long battle against local rivals, the Swindon ENL Wildcats. Both teams tied on points, but Bristol's better record against their rivals earned them the tie-break. However, the close nature of the competition ensured that Bristol were forced to fight to the end. A 3–3 tie at home to the Invicta Mustangs, twice needing to come from behind in the game's dying minutes, providing the foundation required to seal the title against the Streatham Bruins in the Streatham Ice Arena.

Swindon would get their revenge in the Cup, however, winning both legs of the final.

=== Into Division 1 ===
As winners of Division 2, the rules of competition at the time allowed Bristol to decide if they wanted to be promoted to Division 1. While winning Division 2 at the first attempt meant the decision needed to be made earlier than expected, Bristol elected to take their place in Division 1, as did the Swindon ENL Wildcats as Division 2 runners-up.

Bristol strengthened over the summer, bringing in players with experience in the higher leagues. They also took the opportunity to create a second feeder team in Division 2 for those players that were not felt to yet be ready to make the step up. However, both teams suffered a difficult first season in their leagues.

The Division 1 team swept their season-series against Swindon, a result that effectively prevented them from being relegated. But, they only found another three wins in the forty-game schedule and finished a distance off of the mid-table teams in second-last position. The Division 2 team finished bottom of their league after the team were docked the points from a home win over the Peterborough Islanders for playing an illegible player. The two points lost would have placed the team above the Streatham Bruins.

But, surviving that first season in Division 1 gave the team credibility, allowing them to attract more established players. The headline summer signing was Egidijus Bauba, the most capped player ever for the Lithuania national ice hockey team, from the Swindon Wildcats in the English Premier Ice Hockey League. As a result, Bristol were able to hold their own in the league, finishing sixth and qualifying for their first ever playoffs.

The Division 2 farm team also fared better, winning 9 of their 24 games to finish 10th out of 13 teams.

The biggest news came in January 2012 when it was announced that Bristol Ice Rink planned to close, leaving the team's future unclear as they closed out the season.

Having qualified for the playoffs, the Division 1 side faced the previous season's league champions, the Wightlink Raiders, in the first round. Bristol put up a strong performance, losing both games by two-goals each. The team's 8–6 defeat in the second leg would be the last senior game ever held in Bristol Ice Rink.

=== Life without a rink ===
Hoping that the ice rink closure could be delayed, Bristol decided to continue into the 2012–13 season. However, a compromise was accepted where the team would only play in the re-branded National Ice Hockey League South Division 2. Furthermore, they backloaded their fixture list so that all of their home games would be in the second half of the season.

In the end, there would be no reprieve for the rink, and so Bristol were forced to find ice time elsewhere in order to stay in operation. Home games were played in Swindon, Oxford, Basingstoke and Solihull as the team spent the entire season playing catch up in the schedule. The team were the last to fall out of the title chase, leaving the Oxford City Stars as champions. Slightly deflated, Bristol struggled in their remaining games, eventually finishing in fourth.

Having survived a first season on the road, the team agreed to keep on playing until a new rink was built in their own city. Regular ice time was found in Oxford Ice Rink which gave the team some stability and allowed them to put together their best season since their inaugural season in 2009. The team would have a strong fight all season long against their cohabitants in Oxford. Stars would win that season-long series 3 games to 2, including a 3–1 defeat in the Cup Final in Oxford.

In one of the tightest races in the league's history with five teams still in with a chance of winning with two weeks left, Bristol eventually finished in third place. They had the best record against the teams in the top half of the table, including a season-sweep against the runners-up, the Slough Jets. Ultimately, it would be dropped points against the weaker teams that would cost Bristol the championship.

The 2014–15 season started with the promise that the previous season could be built upon. But, a win against the Basingstoke Buffalo in September would be their last of the year as the team went on a disastrous streak of seven games without a win.

Bristol strengthened over the Christmas break, bringing in Steve Osman and Jamie Newton back to the club after both had been playing for Division 1 teams earlier in the season. Both had an immediate impact and Bristol would go on to go unbeaten in the second half of the season. The run would see the team win the Western Conference in their last game of the season against the Wightlink Tigers. The Peterborough Islanders were dispatched with ease in the playoff semi-finals to set up a final between the conference winners, after Slough had easily beaten Basingstoke in the other semi-final.

A 4-0 shut-out in their home leg, played in Swindon, gave Bristol control of the series and their first ever double after winning the second leg 5–4.

The following two seasons, were a disappointment, however. The team never really got going, missing out on the playoffs and only scraping into the cup semi-finals in their last qualification game in 2015-16 and then failing to qualify for the cup semi-finals and losing 14–6 to the Peterborough Islanders on aggregate in the playoff semi-finals.

=== Home Again ===
On 30 October 2021, after 3492 days since they played in Bristol, Goaltender John Dibble led the Pitbulls onto their new home ice to face the Romford Raiders at the Ice Planet rink at Cribbs Causeway. Bristol's Jay Warren was the first scorer in a 6–1 win.

In March 2022, it was announced that the Pitbulls would be moving to the NIHL National League in the 2022/23 season.

== Franchise records ==
(as of 29 Nov 2021)

=== Club Honours ===
- 2009-10 ENL South Division 2 Champions
- 2011-12 John Nike Cup Champions
- 2014-15 NIHL South Division 2 Western Conference Champions
- 2014-15 NIHL South Division 2 Playoff Champions
- 2022-23 NIHL South Division 2 Champions

=== Club Records ===
Club records cover both the Bristol Pitbulls and their second, development team.

- Most games without defeat: 20 (January 2015 - October 2015)
- Most goals scored by both teams in a game: 26 (6-20 @ Solent Junior Devils, 15 March 2020)
- Most goals scored by Pitbulls in a game: 21 (4-21 @ Lee Valley Lions, 6 February 2010)
- Biggest winning margin: 17 (4-21 @ Lee Valley Lions, 6 February 2010)
- Fewest goals scored by both teams in a game: 1 (0-1 v Slough Jets, 27 November 2021)
- Biggest losing margin: 15 (16-1 @ Solent & Gosport Devils, 19 September 2010)
- Most goals conceded in a game: 16 (16-1 @ Solent & Gosport Devils, 19 September 2010)
- Most shots without scoring in a game: 61 (0-1 v Slough Jets, 27 November 2021)

=== Player Records ===
==== Career Records ====
- Most games: 291, Richie Hargreaves
- Most goals: 185, Olly Shone
- Most assists: 301, Richie Hargreaves
- Most points: 441, Richie Hargreaves
- Most penalty minutes: 1041, Richie Hargreaves
- Most points by a defenceman: 134, Mike Hargreaves
- Most points by a netminder: 3, Ross Webster
- Longest goal-scoring streak: 10, Zach Dolphin (2019–20)
- Youngest player: 16 years and 3 days, Josh Shaw (24 October 2021 @ Oxford City Stars)
- Youngest goal scorer: 16 years and 23 days, Josh Shaw (13 November 2021 v Invicta Dynamos)
- Most career games without a goal (non-netminder): 35, Graham Chilcott

==== Season Records ====
- Most goals, all competitions: 33, Sam Hayman (2009–10)
- Most goals, league: 32, Steve Fisher (2011–12)
- Most assists, all competitions: 52, Richie Hargreaves (2009–10)
- Most assists, league: 46, Steve Osman (2011–12)
- Most points, all competitions: 83, Richie Hargreaves (2009–10)
- Most points, league: 72, Steve Osman (2011–12)
- Most penalty minutes, all competitions: 190, Alan Armour (2010–11)
- Most penalty minutes, league: 190, Alan Armour (2010–11)

==== Game Records ====
- Most goals: 6, Sam Hayman (v Romford Fury, 2009–10) and Adrian Smith (@ Wightlink Tigers, 2011–12)
- Most assists: 9, Richie Hargreaves (@ Lee Valley Lions, 2009–10)
- Most points: 10, Richie Hargreaves (@ Lee Valley Lions, 2009–10)

== Season-by-Season Record ==
Season	Competitions	GP	W	T	L	Pts	GF	GA	Finish	Playoffs
2009-10	ENL South Division 2	20	17	2	1	36	140	54	Champions
	ENL South Division 2 Cup	8	6	0	2	12	53	33		Runners-up
2010-11	ENL South Division 1	40	7	2	31	16	137	270	10th	Did not qualify
	ENL South Division 2	24	3	1	20	7	65	167	13th
2011-12	ENL South Division 1	36	13	4	19	30	150	181	6th	First round
	ENL South Division 2	24	9	2	13	20	114	132	10th
2012-13	NIHL South Division 2	22	12	3	7	27	109	98	4th
2013-14	NIHL South Division 2	22	14	2	6	30	111	76	3rd
	NIHL South Division 2 Cup	6	5	0	1	10	34	16		Runners-up
2014-15	NIHL South Division 2 Western Conference	16	11	2	3	24	96	38	Champions	Champions
	NIHL South Division 2 Cup	6	1	2	3	4	24	30		Did not qualify
2015-16	NIHL South Division 2 Western Conference	16	8	2	6	18	67	56	3rd	Did not qualify
	NIHL South Division 2 Cup	6	3	1	2	7	30	26		Lost semi-final
2016-17	NIHL South Division 2 Western Conference	16	7	4	5	20	72	55	2nd	Lost semi-final
	NIHL South Division 2 Cup	6	3	1	2	7	25	20		Did not qualify
2017-18	NIHL South Division 2	26	10	2	14	22	103	104	7th	Lost quarter-final
2018-19	NIHL South Division 2	28	12	3	13	27	118	121	9th	Did not qualify
2019-20	NIHL South Division 2 Western Conference	19	10	0	9	20	117	81	3rd	Postseason cancelled
	NIHL South Division 2 Cup	6	4	0	2	8	28	23	2nd	No playoffs held
Season	Competitions	GP	W	L	OTL	Pts	GF	GA	Finish	Playoffs
2020-21	NIHL 1 South	0	0	0	0	0	0	0		Season not played
2021-22	NIHL 1 South	32	17	11	2	40	140	108	3rd	Lost semi-final
2022-23	NIHL	56	15	35	6	36	200	291	9th	Did not qualify
2023-24	NIHL	54	10	40	4	24	161	321	11th	Did not qualify
