= Nottingham Lions =

Ice hockey team in Nottingham, England

- City: Nottingham, England
- League: NIHL
- Conference: North Division 1
- Founded: 2000
- Home arena: National Ice Centre, Nottingham; Capacity: 1000; Ice size: 180ft x 85ft
- Colours: White, Gold & Black
- General manager: Louise Challans
- Head coach: Matt Bradbury
- Captain: Luke Thomas
- Affiliates: Nottingham Lions 2, NIHL 2
- Website: Nottingham Lions

The Nottingham Lions are an ice hockey team from Nottingham, England that compete in the English National League's northern section. The Lions are the senior team of the Nottingham Ice Hockey Club and one of two senior teams based in Nottingham, the other being the professional Nottingham Panthers. The club were members of the English Premier League between 2000 and 2003 before transferring to their current league.

The Nottingham Lions were the 2007/08 English National League Northern and National Champions, beating the Peterborough Islanders in the National championship.

The Lions also won the inaugural English National Ice Hockey League Playoffs, held at Coventry Skydome in April 2009. The Lions beat the Southern Champions, Invicta Dynamos, in a penalty shootout, after the game finished level at 2–2 after sudden-death overtime.

== Club roster 2022–23 ==
(*) Denotes a Non-British Trained player (Import)

Netminders
No.	Nat.	Player	Catches	Date of birth	Place of birth	Acquired	Contract
1	(England)	Luca Sheldon		19 July 2002 (age 24)	England	2018 from Nottingham U20	Two-Way
30	(England)	Oliver Goodman		2003 (age 19)	England	2022 from Widnes Wild	Two-Way
	(England)	Matthew Bloor	L	1 January 2004 (age 22)	England	2021 from Nottingham U18	Two-Way
	(England)	Isaac Ballinger		2005 (age 17)	England	2022 from Coventry U18	Two-Way
	(England)	Deacon Hardy		2006 (age 16)	England	2022 from Nottingham Lions 2	Two-Way

Defencemen
No.	Nat.	Player	Shoots	Date of birth	Place of birth	Acquired	Contract
5	(England)	Jordan Wright	R	5 December 1997 (age 28)	England	2015 from Nottingham U18	22/23
7	(England)	Zandy Cleves 'A'	R	13 January 1992 (age 34)	Uppingham, England	2021	22/23
9	(England)	Luke Clouting-Thomas Captain'C'	R	25 September 1985 (age 40)	Solihull, England	2012 from Solihull Barons	22/23
12	(England)	Myles Keogh	R	2004 (age 18)	Nottingham, England	2021 from Nottingham U18	Two-Way
18	(England)	Ryan Keogh		2000 (age 22)	England	2021 from Nottingham U20	22/23
20	(England)	Benjamin Marples		2001 (age 21)	England	2021 from Sutton Sting	22/23
22	(England)	Thomas Dermott 'A'	R	17 September 2003 (age 22)	England	2021 from Nottingham U18	22/23
25	(England)	Owen Davis	R	15 February 1999 (age 27)	Harlow, England	2019 from Nottingham U20	22/23
97	(England)	Robert Oxley		26 November 2005 (age 20)	England	2022 from Peterborough Phantoms 2	Two-Way
	(England)	Joe Howie	R	14 September 2004 (age 21)	Nottingham, England	2021 from Nottingham U18	Two-Way
	(England)	Billy Crofts		2 September 2004 (age 22)	England	2021 from Nottingham U18	Two-Way
	(England)	Reuben Sweenie-Fuller		2006 (age 16)	England	2022 from Coventry U18	Two-Way

Forwards
No.	Nat.	Player	Shoots	Date of birth	Place of birth	Acquired	Contract
4	(England)	Jacob Race		8 April 2004 (age 22)	England	2021 from Nottingham U18	Two-Way
11	(England)	Jack Crowston	R	21 January 2001 (age 25)	England	2016 from Nottingham U18	22/23
13	(England)	Maxim Hirst		2002 (age 20)	England	2021 from Sheffield Senators	22/23
14	(England)	Toby Fisher	L	9 November 2003 (age 22)	Nottingham, England	2021 from Nottingham U18	Two-Way
19	(England)	Reaghan Taylor		2002 (age 20)	England	2021 from Hull Jets	22/23
23	(Switzerland) (United States)	Zachary Yokoyama*	R	23 August 2001 (age 25)	Zug, Switzerland	2021 from Lugano U20	22/23
27	(Wales)	James Shaw		2001 (age 21)	Wales	2021 from Deeside Dragons	Two-Way
28	(England)	Kieran Gibbs		19 June 2003 (age 23)	England	2021 from Nottingham U18	22/23
29	(England)	Daniel Martin	R	29 May 2005 (age 21)	England	2021 from Peterborough U18	Two-Way
88	(England)	Benjamin Wilson	R	16 April 1987 (age 39)	Nottingham, England	2013 from Sutton Sting	22/23
94	(England)	Connor Glossop	R	26 September 1997 (age 28)	Nottingham, England	2017 from Peterborough Phantoms	22/23
96	(England)	Tristan Grimshaw	L	14 November 2002 (age 23)	Macclesfield, England	2022 from Widnes Wild	Two-Way
98	(England)	Hamish Hall		1997 (age 25)	England	2013 from Nottingham U18	22/23
	(England)	Josh Hayman		19 May 1990 (age 36)	England	2020	22/23
	(England)	Michael Berehowskyj		3 September 2002 (age 24)	England	2018 from England U20	Two-Way
	(England)	Finnley Wall		2005 (age 17)	England	2021 from Nottingham U18	Two-Way
	(England)	Tyler Somerton		2006 (age 16)	England	2022 from Coventry U18	Two-Way
	(England)	Oliver Dixon		2006 (age 16)	England	2022 from Coventry U18	Two-Way

Team Staff
No.	Nat.	Name	Acquired	Role	Place of birth	Joined From
	(England)	Matt Bradbury	2011–12	Head coach	England
	(England)	Stuart Challans	2021	Assistant coach	England	Nottingham U20
	(England)	Paul Glossop	2011/12	Assistant coach	England
	(England)	Louise Challans	2021/22	General Manager	England	Nottingham U18

== 2021/22 Outgoing ==
Outgoing
No.	Nat.	Player	Shoots	Date of birth	Place of birth	Leaving For
