= Sheffield Scimitars (2020) =

- City: Sheffield, England
- League: NIHL North Division 1
- Founded: 2010
- Home arena: iceSheffield
- Colors: White, Blue & Black
- Affiliates: Sheffield Steeldogs, NIHL National Sheffield Titans, NIHL 2
- Website: Sheffield Scimitars

Franchise history
- 2010-2020: Sheffield Senators
- 2020-: Sheffield Scimitars

The Sheffield Scimitars are an ice hockey team that plays their home games at the iceSheffield in Sheffield. They play in the NIHL 1 Laidler Conference and are affiliated with the Sheffield Steeldogs of the National League. In 2020, Sheffield Academy announced their senior team would once again be known as the Sheffield Scimitars.

== Season-by-season record ==
Season	League	GP	W	T	L	OTW	OTL	GF	GA	Pts.	Rank	Post Season
2010-2011	ENL 2	24	1	0	23	-	-	74	200	2	7	No playoffs held
2011-2012	ENL 2	28	10	2	16	-	-	116	154	22	5	No playoffs held
2012-2013	NIHL 2	24	14	2	8	-	-	123	76	30	4	No playoffs held
2013-2014	NIHL 2	28	10	2	16	-	-	86	117	22	7	Did not make playoffs
2014-2015	NIHL 2	36	27	0	9	-	-	204	125	54	3	Semifinal loss
2015-2016	NIHL 1	31	0	0	31	-	-	58	250	0	9	Relegated
2016-2017	NIHL 2	28	14	6	8	-	-	133	95	34	4	Final loss
2017-2018	NIHL 2	36	19	-	13	2	1	222	134	44	6	Did not make playoffs
2018-2019	NIHL 2	31	15	-	11	2	3	173	126	37	5	Did not make playoffs
2019-2020	NIHL 2	26	10	-	10	4	2	133	112	21	5	Playoffs Cancelled

== Club roster 2022-23 ==
(*) Denotes a Non-British Trained player (Import)

Netminders
No.	Nat.	Player	Catches	Date of birth	Place of birth	Acquired	Contract
29	(England)	Brandon Stones	L	7 February 1993 (age 33)	Nottingham, England	2022 from MK Lightning	22/23
31	(England)	Thomas Hovell	R	20 September 1995 (age 31)	Nottingham, England	2021 from Nottingham Lions	22/23

Defencemen
No.	Nat.	Player	Shoots	Date of birth	Place of birth	Acquired	Contract
11	(England)	William Harper		2002 (age 20)	England	2018 from Sheffield U20	22/23
12	(England)	Jake Howis		1999 (age 23)	England	2021	22/23
19	(England)	Shaun Wild	L	12 September 1993 (age 33)	Sheffield, England	2014 from Invicta Dynamos	22/23
24	(England)	Euan Williams	L	7 May 2006 (age 20)	England	2022 from Sheffield U18	22/23
28	(England)	Sam Colton		2002 (age 20)	England	2019 from Ontario Hockey Academy U18 AA	22/23
33	(England)	Oliver Turner		19 January 2006 (age 20)	England	2021 from Sheffield U18	22/23
52	(England)	Luke Reid	R	25 February 2004 (age 22)	Swindon, England	2022 from Swindon Wildcats 2	22/23

Forwards
No.	Nat.	Player	Shoots	Date of birth	Place of birth	Acquired	Contract
2	(England)	William Szollosy		2003 (age 19)	England	2022 from Sheffield Titans	22/23
9	(England)	Cameron Pywell		28 September 1998 (age 28)	England	2021 from Nottingham Lions	22/23
14	(England)	Scott Morris	R	9 March 1988 (age 38)	Sheffield, England	2021 from Sutton Sting	22/23
15	(England)	Harry Hopkins	R	1999 (age 23)	England	2021 from Nottingham Lions	22/23
20	(Czech Republic)	Michael Danečko	L	23 June 2004 (age 22)	Havirov, Czechia	2021 from Sheffield U18	22/23
21	(England)	Ben Roebuck		2005 (age 17)	England	2021 from Sheffield U18	22/23
23	(England)	Sam Rodgers		2000 (age 22)	England	2019 from Sheffield U20	22/23
34	(England)	Samuel Keeling		30 March 2006 (age 20)	England	2021 from Sheffield U18	22/23
51	(England)	William Newcombe		2002 (age 20)	England	2017 from Sheffield U20	22/23
81	(England)	Benjamin Cutts	R	4 February 2006 (age 20)	Nottingham, England	2022 from Sheffield U18	22/23
82	(England)	Isaac Tse		2004 (age 18)	England	2022 from Ontario Hockey Academy U18 AA	22/23

Team Staff
No.	Nat.	Name	Acquired	Role	Place of birth	Joined From

== 2021/22 Outgoing ==
Outgoing
No.	Nat.	Player	Shoots	Date of birth	Place of birth	Leaving For
3	(England)	Ruskin Hughes	R	16 June 1997 (age 29)	London, England	Invicta Dynamos, NIHL 1
32	(England)	Warren Tait	R	17 April 1981 (age 45)	Nottingham, England	Sheffield Steeldogs, NIHL National
91	(England)	Cam Brownley	R	3 February 1997 (age 29)	Sheffield, England	Hull Seahawks, NIHL National
