= Altrincham Aces =

Ice hockey team in Greater Manchester, England

- City: Altrincham, Greater Manchester
- League: NIHL
- Conference: Division Two North
- Founded: 1961, 2015
- Home arena: Altrincham Ice Dome
- Colours: Navy, Red & White
- Head coach: Elliott Bayne
- Affiliates: Manchester Storm, EIHL
- Website: www.altrinchamaces.org.uk

Franchise history
- 1986-1995: Trafford Metros
- 1961-86, 95-03, 2015-: Altrincham Aces

The Altrincham Aces are a semi-professional and amateur ice hockey team of the English National Ice Hockey League, based in the Altrincham Ice Dome, situated on Oakfield Road in Altrincham, Greater Manchester, England.

The team was initially founded in 1961, the team were based in the old Altrincham Ice Rink, situated on Devonshire Road in Altrincham, Greater Manchester, England, and played until 2003, when the rink was sold, then demolished to make way for a new housing development.

During the period 1986–1995, the team was known as the Trafford Metros, as the team was in part funded by Trafford council. This name was revived in 2009, but then altered to the Manchester Minotaurs in 2013. Until recently the team was affiliated to the Manchester Phoenix a team playing in the English Premier League.

In the course of the team's existence, they played in a variety of regional and national leagues, in the largely amateur structure of the sport within the UK.

In 2015 the Aces were re-formed and entered the English National Ice Hockey League. The team, alongside Widnes Wild, are affiliated to the Manchester Storm (2015–).

== Club roster 2022-23 ==
(*) Denotes a Non-British Trained player (Import)

Netminders
| No. | Nat. | Player | Catches | Date of birth | Place of birth | Acquired | Contract |
| | (England) | Lewis McBride | | 1 April 1993 (age 33) | Altrincham, England | 2019 from Blackburn Eagles | 22/23 |
| | (England) | Evan Coles | L | 13 February 2000 (age 26) | Sheffield, England | 2022 from Widnes Wild | Two-Way |
| | (England) | Bayley Hodkinson | | 2003 (age 19) | England | 2022 from Blackburn Hawks | Two-Way |
| | (England) | Cameron Valentine-Higgs | | 2004 (age 18) | England | 2021 from Manchester U18 | 22/23 |

Defencemen
| No. | Nat. | Player | Shoots | Date of birth | Place of birth | Acquired | Contract |
| 16 | (England) | Max Sullivan | | 2001 (age 21) | Baguley, England | 2018 from Manchester U18 | 22/23 |
| | (Czech Republic) | David Kameníček | | | Prostejov, Czechia | 2019 from Bradford Bulldogs | 22/23 |
| | (England) | James Ashton | | 23 February 1983 (age 43) | England | 2022 | 22/23 |
| | (Hungary) | Dávid Zsombor Kovács | | 14 November 1997 (age 28) | Budapest, Hungary | 2022 from Blackburn Hawks 2 | 22/23 |
| | (England) | Cameron Williams | | 2002 (age 20) | England | 2022 from Widnes U18 | 22/23 |
| | (England) | Ben McLellan | | 2004 (age 18) | England | 2022 from Widnes U18 | 22/23 |
| | (England) | James Best | | 2005 (age 17) | England | 2022 from Manchester U18 | 22/23 |
| | (England) | Charles Phillips | | 2006 (age 16) | England | 2022 from Widnes U18 | 22/23 |

Forwards
| No. | Nat. | Player | Shoots | Date of birth | Place of birth | Acquired | Contract |
| 5 | (England) | Sam Dunford | R | 31 December 1987 (age 38) | Blackpool, England | 2017 from Blackburn Eagles | 22/23 |
| | (England) | Bradley Chapman | | | Ilkley, England | 2018 from Bradford U18 | 22/23 |
| | (England) | Carl Price | | 7 July 1989 (age 37) | England | 2021 from Blackburn Hawks 2 | 22/23 |
| | (England) | CJ Ashton | L | 18 June 1997 (age 29) | England | 2021 from Kingston Diamonds | 22/23 |
| | (England) | Dalton Thompson | | 11 June 2003 (age 23) | England | 2022 from Swindon Wildcats 2 | 22/23 |
| | (England) | Romeo Nixon | | 2003 (age 19) | England | 2021 from Manchester U18 | 22/23 |
| | (England) | Billy King | | 2003 (age 19) | England | 2021 from Manchester U18 | 22/23 |
| | (England) | Elliot Hunt | | 2003 (age 19) | England | 2022 from Manchester U18 | 22/23 |
| | (England) | Grace Garbett | L | 9 August 2003 (age 23) | England | 2022 from Solihull Vixens | Two-Way |
| | (England) | Jake Frost | | 2004 (age 18) | England | 2022 from Sutton Sting | 22/23 |
| | (England) | Luke Mullarkey | | 2004 (age 18) | England | 2022 from Widnes U18 | 22/23 |

Team Staff
| No. | Nat. | Name | Acquired | Role | Place of birth | Joined From |
|---|---|---|---|---|---|---|
| | (England) | Elliott Bayne | 2016-17 | Head coach | England | Manchester Minotaurs, NIHL 1 |
| | (England) | Lee McBride | 2018/19 | Assistant coach | England |
| | (England) | Adam Summerfield | 2022/23 | Goaltending Coach | Whitehaven, England | Manchester Storm Academy, England U16 |
| | (England) | Beth Aldred | 2019/20 | Physical Therapist | England |
| | (England) | Rob Hutchinson | 2016/17 | General Manager | England |

== 2021/22 Outgoing ==
Outgoing
| No. | Nat. | Player | Shoots | Date of birth | Place of birth | Leaving For |
|---|---|---|---|---|---|---|
| 7 | (England) | Alex Parry | | 1 July 1992 (age 34) | England | Deeside Dragons, NIHL 1 |
| 15 | (England) | Luke Watson | | 1995 (age 27) | England | Blackburn Hawks, NIHL 1 |
| 17 | (Northern Ireland) | Andrew Hopkins | | 1997 (age 25) | Northern Ireland | Widnes Wild, NIHL 1 |
| 18 | (England) | Jonathon Williamson | L | 1994 (age 28) | England | Widnes Wild, NIHL 1 |
| 27 | (England) | Dylan Harcourt | | 13 January 2003 (age 23) | England | Blackburn Hawks, NIHL 1 |
| 46 | (England) | Cameron Kushnirenko | | 1999 (age 23) | England | Sutton Sting, NIHL 2 |
| 88 | (England) | Christopher Keating | | 1988 (age 34) | England | Deeside Dragons, NIHL 1 |
