= Sheffield Steeldogs =

- City: Sheffield, England
- League: NIHL
- Division: National League
- Founded: 2010
- Home arena: iceSheffield; Capacity: 1,500
- Colors: Orange, Black & White
- Owner: Tony Smith (England)
- Head coach: Slava Koulikov (United Kingdom)
- Captain: Jonathan Kirk (England)
- Parent club: Sheffield Steelers
- Website: Sheffield Steeldogs

Franchise history
- 1996 – 2010: Sheffield Scimitars
- 2010 – present: Sheffield Steeldogs

The Sheffield Steeldogs are a professional ice hockey team based at the iceSheffield complex in Sheffield, England.

== History ==
The club came into existence during the summer of 2010 as a replacement for the previous tenants of the iceSheffield rink, the Sheffield Scimitars, after the Scimitars were able to fundraise over a million pounds to revamp the team.

The team have played in the English Premier Ice Hockey League from the 2010–2017 season.

After their first season in the EPL, the team achieved a playoff semi-final berth with an 8th-placed finish. The team started the 2011/12 season under the stewardship of Andre Payette, a Canadian forward who was known for his physical presence on the ice rather than his scoring touch, and many in British Ice Hockey had predicted that Sheffield would struggle to a bottom-three finish. Payette's team, made up predominantly of local players and a small band of Eastern European imports, excelled during the 2011/12 season, pulling off several shock wins, including a win against fierce rivals Manchester Phoenix, a strong 3:1 win against Slough Jets and a fantastic 2:0 away shutout at MK Lightning. The Steeldogs had mixed physical hockey with attacking flare to fire their way to a solid top-5 spot and dispelled any notions of a 'goon hockey' tag by achieving a semi-final place against Milton Keynes Lightning (Sheffield Steeldogs won the first leg 1:0 at Ice Sheffield).

The Steeldogs went on to finish third in the league after hinting at a title challenge. A two-goal victory of the Basingstoke Bison in their playoff quarter final led to their first appearance at the playoff finals in Coventry. There the Steeldogs met archrivals the Manchester Phoenix in an epic battle that was decided on penalty shots in favour of the Lancashire outfit. The Steeldogs also reached the EPL cup final but were soundly beaten by league champion Guildford Flames as they did the double.

Andre Payette once again led the Steeldogs in 2012/13 but faced a big challenge to repeat the success of the previous season. With young goaltender Ben Bowns making the switch to the EIHL and an aging defence, it proved to be a difficult rebuilding process for the still inexperienced coach. Fans had hoped that Ben Bowns would be re-signed, however he switched to the EIHL becoming the starting net minder for Hull Stingrays.

== Club roster 2025-26 ==
Netminders
No.	Nat.	Player	Catches	Date of birth	Place of birth	Acquired	Contract
32	(England)	Alex Oldale	L	15 December 2004 (age 21)	Sheffield GBR	2025 from Manchester Storm	25/26
31	(England)	Curtis Warburton	R	22 October 2001 (age 24)	RotherhamGBR	2017 from Bradford Bulldogs	2-way
34	Canada	Brady Parker	L	10 July 2000 (age 25)	Scottsdale, Arizona USA	2025 from Clarkson University	25/26
88	United KingdomRussia	Dmitri Zimozdra	L	8 June 1988 (age 37)	Omsk, RUS	2026 from Hull Seahawks	25/26

Defencemen
No.	Nat.	Player	Shoots	Date of birth	Place of birth	Acquired	Contract
3	(England)	Liam Steele	R	21 April 2004 (age 22)	Cobham, GBR	2025 from Cornell University	25/26
6	(England)	Ben Morgan	R	24 October 1987 (age 39)	Sheffield, England	2011 from the Manchester Phoenix	25/26
13	England	David Phillips	R	14 August 1987 (age 38)	Hull, England	2025 from Hull Seahawks	25/26
16	(United Kingdom) | (Finland)	Emil Oksanen	L	10 July 2006 (age 20)	London, England	2025 from Kiekko-Espoo U20 Ch	25/26
22	(England)	Oliver Turner	L	19 January 2006 (age 20)	England	2022 from Sheffield Scimitars/Sheffield Titans	25/26
25	England	Oliver Knaggs	L	4 November 2005 (age 20)	Watford, England	2025 from Berkshire Bees	25/26
42	(England)	Tim Smith	L	4 August 1988 (age 38)	Sheffield, England	2013 from Invicta Dynamos	25/26
90	(England)	Jonathan Kirk CaptainC'	L	21 August 1995 (age 31)	Maltby, England	2020 from Hull Pirates	25/26
95	England	Finley Williams	Unknown	4 December 2008 (age 17)	Unknown	2025 from Sheffield Scimitars	3-way(with Sheffield Scimitars and Sheffield Steelhawks)
96	(Canada)	C.J. Garcia	L	3 February 1996 (age 30)	Pickering, Ontario, Canada	2025 from Manchester Storm	25/26

Forwards
No.	Nat.	Player	Date of birth	Place of birth	Shoots	Acquired	Contract
5	(England)	Brady Doxey	8 September 2000 (age 26)	Chesterfield, England	R	2019 from Sutton Sting	25/26
8	(United States)	Walker Sommer	29 April 1996 (age 30)	Avon, Ohio, USA	L	2024 from Lindau Islanders	25/26
11	(Canada)	Bair Gendunov	11 May 2000 (age 26)	Toronto, Ontario, Canada	R	2025 from SC Riessersee	25/26
15	(England)	Joe Matthewman	28 February 2008 (age 18)	Sheffield, England	L	2025 from Sheffield Scimitars, Sheffield Titans, Sheffield Steelhawks U18's	25/26
17	(England)	Jacob Brammer	1 November 2006 (age 19)	Sheffield, England	L	2023 from Sheffield Academy U19's	25/26
20	(Wales)	Jonathan Phillips	14 July 1982 (age 44)	Cardiff, Wales	R	2023 from Sheffield Steelers	25/26
23	(United Kingdom) (Czech Republic)	Michael Danecko	23 April 2004 (age 22)	Czech Republic/England	R	2025 from Leeds Knights	25/26
27	England	Cole Shudra	11 August 1998 (age 27)	Rotherham, England	L	2023 from Leeds Knights	2-way
29	(England)	Nathan Ripley	5 March 2002 (age 24)	England	L	2024 from Coventry Blaze	25/26
37	England	Kyle Watson	17 August 2000 (age 25)	Wakefield, England	R	2025 from Trine Thunder	2-way
46	Scotland	Bailey Yates	31 December 2007 (age 18)	Lanarkshire, Scotland	R	2025 from Utah Outliers	25/26
68	(United Kingdom) (Hungary)	András Kéhl	2 March 2003 (age 23)	England	R	2025 from Edson Eagles	25/26
72	(United Kingdom) (Sweden) (Scotland)	Ivan Björkly Nordström	20 September 2002 (age 24)	Edinburgh, GBR	R	2024 from Peterborough Phantoms	25/26
91	(Finland)	Joonas Larinmaa	29 October 1992 (age 33)	Turku, Finland	L	2025 from JoKP, TUTO Hockey	25/26
95	Scotland	Joe Lynch	2 June 2006 (age 19)	Kirkcaldy, Scotland	L	2025 from Fife Flyers	2-way

Team Staff
No.	Nat.	Name	Acquired	Position	Place of birth	Joined from
	(United Kingdom) (Ukraine) (Russia)	Slava Koulikov	2025 –	Head Coach	Yekaterinburg, RUS	Peterborough Phantoms
	(Scotland)	Jamie McIlroy	2024 –	General Manager	Paisley, SCO	-
	(England)	Steve Weeks	2023 –	Director of Player Development	Barnsley, England	-

== 2022-23 Outgoing ==
Outgoing
No.	Nat.	Player	Shoots	Date of birth	Place of birth	Leaving For
72	(England)	Charlie Henry	L	5 February 2005 (age 21)	Nottingham, England	No team, NIHL
74	(England)	Lee Bonner	L	5 March 1997 (age 29)	Hull, England	Hull Seahawks, NIHL
12	(England)	Jordan Buesa	L	16 October 2000 (age 26)	Troon, GBR	Glasgow Clan, EIHL

== 2017/18 Season ==
League

This is the first season that the Sheffield Steeldogs were to participate in the National Ice Hockey League North conference, the Moralee Conference. The season started with player coach Ben Morgan assembling his team and completing the roster with a mix of youth, speed, experience and skill, with the majority of players being a 'home grown player' and being from the Sheffield area. Lewis Bell was named the club's captain at the start of the season with the assistants being Tim Smith and Ashley Calvert.

The first game of the season was away to the last league champions on the former English Premier League, the Telford Tigers. It saw the Steeldogs set the tempo for the season by taking the Tigers to overtime and just falling short in the final period. The dogs would then go unbeaten in the next 11 league games. Andrew Hirst reached a personal milestone in this time by scoring his 100th goal for the Steeldogs in a win against the Billingham Stars on 23 September 2017.

Steeldogs first trip to Blackburn proved to be a thrilling game. The Hawks would take an early lead in the game and it would take the Dogs 59 minutes of the game to score their first goal, Ashley Calvert getting the equaliser in the last minute of regulation. The game then went to overtime when a penalty shot was awarded to the dogs, Milan Kolena scoring the penalty shot and winning the frantic game.

26 November would see the second meeting of the season between the Steeldogs and Hull Pirates, but the first meeting in the league between the sides. The contest that took place in Hull saw the Pirates take the points and hand the Steeldogs their first defeat in the league in regular time.

The Dogs would go December unbeaten and in January would only lose once, to Telford Tigers in a 1–0 loss at home.

February's league campaign would start off slow with a loss away to Whitley Bay. This loss was following a home and away fixture against the Pirates on Friday and Saturday, the Sunday game showed the Steeldogs concede 3 goals in the final period against a Warriors team playing their only game of the weekend. The Steeldogs would win the remaining of their games in February and leave them on top of the Moralee Conference.

March left the Steeldogs with 4 games remaining in the league, Hull Pirates had a game in hand on the Dogs and were only 1 point behind the Dogs in the league. Following 2 wins for the dogs and 3 wins for the Pirates, one of these against 3rd place Telford, the league came down to the final weekend with 2 games against Hull. Both games were a must win for the Dogs, 1 victory for the Pirates would see them take the league. Saturdays game would see the forth shutout in a row for Dmitri Zimozdra as the Dogs would win 1–0. Sundays game was a much more open affair with a 6–4 win for the Dogs which saw them win the league in Hull's rink.

National Cup

The majority of games in December and early January were for the National Cup against Peterborough Phantoms and Hull Pirates. Within this group the Steeldogs managed to win 3 games and lost 4 in regulation and 1 in overtime. This was enough to see the Steeldogs prevail onto the next stage of the cup with the help of some adjusted points between the final Hull and Peterborough game.

The next stage saw the Dogs come up against close rivals Hull in the semi-finals of the cup. The games were a home and away fixture with an aggregate score between the 2 games.

The first game took place in Sheffield and saw the Dogs win 3–2. The Dogs then managed to increase the aggregate score away in Hull and win the overall fixture by winning 3–1, winning the overall competition 6-3 and advancing onto the National Cup final against Swindon Wildcats.

Autumn Cup

The Steeldogs would bail out of the Autumn Cup throughout September and October against Basingstoke Bison and Peterborough Phantoms.
