= Peterborough Phantoms =

Ice hockey team in Cambridgeshire, England

- City: Peterborough, England
- League: NIHL
- Division: National League
- Founded: 2002
- Home arena: Planet Ice Peterborough; Capacity: 1,250
- Colors: Navy, Orange & White
- Head coach: Ashley Tait (United Kingdom) (Canada)
- Captain: Luke Ferrara (England) (United Kingdom)
- Affiliates: Chelmsford Chieftains, NIHL 1; Peterborough Phantoms 2, NIHL 2; Peterborough Phantoms Women, WNIHL 2
- Website: gophantoms.co.uk

Franchise history
- 2002–present: Peterborough Phantoms

The Peterborough Phantoms are a British ice hockey team that play at the Planet Ice Peterborough Arena, in Bretton, Peterborough. The Peterborough Phantoms ice hockey club was founded in 2002. It replaced the former city based team, the Peterborough Pirates, and plays in the same arena. The team currently competes in the semi-professional National Ice Hockey League, the second tier in British ice hockey below the fully professional Elite Ice Hockey League (EIHL). They previously played in the English Premier Ice Hockey League (EPIHL).

The team won the English Premier League and Cup Double in its first season (2002–03) and retained the Cup the following year. After four years, they won the 2007–08 Knock-out Cup followed by the 2008–09 season in which the Phantoms won the English Premier League, English Premier Cup and the play-offs. In the 2018–19 season, the Phantoms won the NIHL 1 Autumn Cup, NIHL 1 South Cup and NIHL South Playoff competitions, and also finished as part of the NIHL 1 National Playoff Final Four. In the 2023-24 season, the Phantoms won the NIHL National Play-offs.

== Club history ==
Ice hockey in Peterborough started in 1981 when the first ice rink built in the UK since the 1960s was opened. The Peterborough Pirates was formed in the summer of 1982. The team joined Division One of the three division National League and two seasons later won promotion to the top level of UK ice hockey. Attendance topped the 1,000 mark on a regular basis and the Pirates reached the 1991 championship play-off final at Wembley, appearing live on mainstream TV. They played in the final again in 1992, but struggled in the increasingly competitive 1990s as new arena based teams arrived.

In 2002, the Peterborough Pirates folded and was replaced with the Peterborough Phantoms in the lower division English Premier Ice Hockey League (EPIHL). The Phantoms secured a league and Cup championship in their debut season and retained the Cup the following season. They won the Knockout Cup in season 2007–08, and won all three major honours in 2008–09.

The Phantoms joined the National Ice Hockey League (NIHL) after the EPIHL folded in 2017. In 2019, a new ten-team division was approved to sit above the existing Division 1 (North and South). Alongside the Phantoms, the National League contains Basingstoke Bison, Bracknell Bees, Hull Pirates, Leeds Chiefs, MK Lightning, Raiders IHC, Sheffield Steeldogs, Swindon Wildcats and Telford Tigers.

== Club honours ==
- EPIHL
  - Play-Off Championship winners: 2008–09, 2014–15
  - English Premier Cup winners: 2002–03, 2003–04, 2008–09
  - League winners: 2002–03, 2008–09
  - Knockout Cup winners: 2007–08
- NIHL
  - Autumn Cup winners: 2018–19
  - South Cup winners: 2018–19
  - South Playoff winners: 2018–19
  - National Cup Winners : 2022–23
  - NIHL National Playoff Winners : 2023-24

== Club roster 2022-23 ==
(*) Denotes a Non-British Trained player (Import)

Netminders
No.	Nat.	Player	Catches	Date of birth	Place of birth	Acquired	Contract
33	(Scotland)	Jordan Marr	L	10 June 1991 (age 35)	Lochgelly, Scotland	2018 from Fife Flyers	22/23
42	(England) (Sweden)	Tyler de la Bertouche	L	15 November 2005 (age 20)	London, England	2022 from Raiders IHC	Two-Way
44	(England)	Ryan Bainborough	R	22 July 1992 (age 33)	Nottingham, England	2017 from Raiders IHC	22/23

Defencemen
No.	Nat.	Player	Shoots	Date of birth	Place of birth	Acquired	Contract
2	(England)	Tom Norton	R	16 June 1990 (age 36)	Nottingham, England	2013 from Nottingham Panthers	22/23
4	(England)	Archie Salisbury		8 August 2006 (age 19)	England	2022 from Peterborough Phantoms U18	Two-Way
11	(England)	Scott Robson	R	16 August 1995 (age 30)	Beverley, England	2014 from Hull Stingrays	22/23
23	(England)	Brad Bowering	L	23 January 2002 (age 24)	Peterborough, England	2017 from Peterborough Phantoms U18	22/23
25	(England)	Billy Thorpe	R	2005 (age 15/16)	Peterborough, England	2021 from Peterborough Phantoms U18	24/25
35	(England)	Joe Gretton	L	27 June 1997 (age 28)	Nottingham, England	2019 from Nottingham Lions	22/23
45	(Wales)	Callum Buglass 'A'	L	23 July 1996 (age 29)	Cardiff, Wales	2018 from Cardiff Fire	24/25
90	(England)	Tom Barry	R	11 May 1997 (age 29)	Sheffield, England	2021 from Sheffield Steeldogs	22/23

Forwards
No.	Nat.	Player	Shoots	Date of birth	Place of birth	Acquired	Contract
12	(England)	Nathan Pollard	L	20 May 1993 (age 33)	Peterborough, England	2018 from Peterborough Phantoms 2	22/23
19	(England)	Leo Markey		2004 (age 18)	England	2022 from Peterborough Phantoms 2	Two-Way
21	(England)	Luc Johnson	L	21 July 1997 (age 28)	Milton Keynes, England	2020 from Swindon Wildcats	22/23
24	(England)	Austin Mitchell-King	L	1 November 2001 (age 24)	Warwick, England	2022 from Telford Tigers	Two-Way
29	(England)	Will Weldon 'C'	R	28 May 1993 (age 33)	Nottingham, England	2011 from Nottingham Lions	22/23
34	(Latvia)	Ralfs Circenis	L	6 September 1997 (age 28)	Riga, Latvia	2022 from Lindefallets SK	22/23
38	(Scotland)	Duncan Speirs	L	27 July 1997 (age 28)	Irvine, Scotland	2020 from Dundee Stars	22/23
71	(United Kingdom) / (Canada)	Corey McEwen	L	1 November 1992 (age 33)	Cardiff, Wales	2018 from Telford Tigers	22/23
72	(England)	Glenn Billing 'A'	L	28 May 1997 (age 29)	Romford, England	2017 from Milton Keynes Lightning	22/23
91	(Czech Republic)	Lukas Sladkovsky*	L	10 April 1996 (age 30)	Prague, Czech Republic	2022 from Raiders IHC	22/23
93	(Czech Republic)	Aleš Padělek*	L	4 March 1980 (age 46)	Jihlava, Czech Republic	2021 from BK Havlíčkův Brod	22/23
95	(England)	Jasper Foster		2003 (age 17/18)	England	2021 from Swindon Cougars	22/23
96	(England)	Jarvis Hunt	R	16 January 2002 (age 24)	Aylesbury, England	2017 from Peterborough Phantoms U18	22/23

Team Staff
No.	Nat.	Name	Acquired	Position	Place of birth	Joined from
	(United Kingdom) / (Ukraine)	Slava Koulikov	2013-14	Head Coach/Director of Hockey Operations	Yekaterinburg, Russia	Slough Jets, EPIHL
2	(England)	Tom Norton	2017-18	Player-Assistant Coach	Nottingham, England
	(United States)	Lee Elias	2014-15	Development Coach	Havertown, Pennsylvania, USA
	(England)	Kristian Kenny	2021-22	Equipment Manager	England
	(England)	David O'Meara	2017-18	Equipment Manager	England
	(England)	Rochelle Owen	2021-22	Physical Therapist	England

== 2021/22 outgoing ==
Outgoing
No.	Nat.	Player	Shoots	Date of birth	Place of birth	Leaving For
40	(Czech Republic)	Petr Stepanek	L	28 March 1990 (age 36)	Žďár nad Sázavou, Czech Republic	SKLH Žďár nad Sázavou, Czechia3
75	(England)	Ross Clarke	R	16 April 2002 (age 24)	Peterborough, England	Raiders IHC 2, NIHL 1
91	(England)	Nathan Salem	L	17 September 1991 (age 34)	Whitley Bay, England	Hull Seahawks, NIHL

=== Season-by-season record ===
Season	League	GP	W	T	L	OTW	OTL	Pts.	Rank	Post Season
2002-03	EPIHL	42	34	3	5	-	-	71	1	Final Loss
2003-04	EPIHL	32	25	2	5	-	-	52	2	Semifinal Loss
2004-05	EPIHL	32	18	4	10	-	-	40	2	Final Loss
2005-06	EPIHL	48	23	6	19	-	-	52	9	Did not qualify
2006-07	EPIHL	44	25	1	13	-	5	56	6	Semifinal Loss
2007-08	EPIHL	44	22	-	12	3	3	53	4	Quarterfinal Loss
2008-09	EPIHL	54	36	-	13	2	3	79	1	Champions
2009-10	EPIHL	54	24	-	23	2	5	57	6	Quarterfinal Loss
2010-11	EPIHL	54	24	-	20	3	6	61	6	Semifinal Loss
2011-12	EPIHL	54	17	-	27	3	7	47	8	Quarterfinal Loss
2012-13	EPIHL	54	18	-	28	5	3	49	8	Quarterfinal Loss
2013-14	EPIHL	54	18	-	27	0	9	45	9	Did not qualify
2014-15	EPIHL	48	21	-	19	6	2	56	4	Champions
2015-16	EPIHL	54	35	-	11	-	8	78	2	Semifinal Loss
2016-17	EPIHL	48	29	-	17	-	2	60	4	Did not qualify
2017-18	NIHL 1 South	32	23	-	3	4	2	56	2	Conference Final Loss
2018-19	NIHL 1 South	42	24	-	8	4	6	62	2	Conference champions
2019-20	NIHL National	50	28	-	17	3	2	64	3	Playoffs Cancelled
2021-22	NIHL National	48	22	-	21	3	2	52	6	Semifinal Loss
2022-23	NIHL National	0	0	0	0	0	0	0	0	TBD

== Retired numbers ==
Peterborough Phantoms retired numbers
No.	Player	Position	Career
6	Lewis Buckman	RW	1999–2010
7	Doug McEwen	F	1980–2006
9	John Lawless	F	1982–1999
10	Kevin King	C	1984–2004
15	Jason Porter	D	1986–2003
17	James Ferrara	F	2000–2020
20	Randy Smith	C	1981–2000
22	Dwayne Newman	D	1986–2014
39	Maris Ziedins	F	1992–2013

== 22/23 head to head ==
League, Cup & Play Offs - Record (0-0-0)

TEAM	GP	W	L	OTL	GF	GA
Basingstoke Bison	0	0	0	0	0	0
Bees IHC	0	0	0	0	0	0
Bristol Pitbulls	0	0	0	0	0	0
Hull Seahawks	0	0	0	0	0	0
Leeds Knights	0	0	0	0	0	0
MK Lightning	0	0	0	0	0	0
Raiders IHC	0	0	0	0	0	0
Sheffield Steeldogs	0	0	0	0	0	0
Swindon Wildcats	0	0	0	0	0	0
Telford Tigers	0	0	0	0	0	0
TOTAL	0	0	0	0	0	0

== 22/23 statistics ==
(source:)

=== Top ten scorers ===
League, Cup & Play Offs; as of 24 August 2022

Player
No.	Nat.	Player	Games Played	Goals
1
2
3
4
5
6
7
8
9
10

=== Top ten assisters ===
League, Cup & Play Offs; as of 24 August 2022

Player
No.	Nat.	Player	Games Played	Assists
1
2
3
4
5
6
7
8
9
10

=== Top ten point scorers ===
League, Cup & Play Offs; as of 24 August 2022

Player
No.	Nat.	Player	Games Played	Total Points
1
2
3
4
5
6
7
8
9
10

=== Top ten penalty minute ratios ===
League, cup & playoffs; as of 24 August 2022

Player
No.	Nat.	Player	Games Played	Minutes Assessed	Minutes/Games Ratio
1
2
3
4
5
6
7
8
9
10
