= Cardiff Fire 2 =

- City: Cardiff, Wales
- League: NIHL 2 South West Division
- Founded: 2017
- Home arena: Ice Arena Wales
- Colors: Black & Red
- Head coach: Gareth Dixon
- Captain: Tom Smith
- Affiliates: Cardiff Devils, Cardiff Fire
- Website: Cardiff Fire 2

The Cardiff Fire 2 were an ice hockey team based in Cardiff, Wales. They played in the NIHL 2 South West Division. The Cardiff Fire 2 are a minor league affiliate of the Cardiff Devils of the Elite Ice Hockey League, and Cardiff Fire of the NIHL 1 South Division.

== Season-by-season record ==
Season	League	GP	W	T	L	OTW	OTL	Pts.	Rank	Postseason
2017–2018	NIHL 2	26	10	-	15	1	0	22	9th	Did not make playoffs
2019-2020	NIHL 2	20	1	-	18	0	1	3	6th	Playoffs Cancelled

== Club roster 2020–21 ==
Netminders
No.	Nat.	Player	Catches	Date of birth	Place of birth	Acquired	Contract

Defencemen
No.	Nat.	Player	Shoots	Date of birth	Place of birth	Acquired	Contract

Forwards
No.	Nat.	Player	Shoots	Date of birth	Place of birth	Acquired	Contract

== 2020/21 Outgoing ==
Outgoing
No.	Nat.	Player	Shoots	Date of birth	Place of birth	Leaving For
