= Solihull Barons =

- City: Solihull, England
- League: NIHL
- Conference: Division One North
- Founded: 2005
- Home arena: Planet Ice Solihull; Capacity: 800
- Colours: White, Red & Black
- Head coach: Phil Lee
- Website: http://www.solihull-barons.net/

Franchise history
- 1965-1996: Solihull Barons
- 1996-2000: Solihull Blaze (rebranded as Coventry Blaze)
- 2000-2002: Solihull Barons
- 2002-2003: Solihull MK Kings (formerly MK Kings)
- 2003-2005: Solihull Kings
- 2005-: Solihull Barons

The Solihull Barons are an English ice hockey team from the town of Solihull who play at Solihull Ice Rink on Hobs Moat Road. The current team, which is the third incarnation of the Barons, was formed in 2005; they are named after the original team of the same name who were formed in 1965, and played at the same ice rink between 1972 until 2000, after which they moved to Coventry and became the Coventry Blaze.

== History ==
=== Previous incarnations ===
The Solihull Barons won the Southern League in 1977–78 and the English League in 1992–93. Canadian Rick Fera played for the original Solihull Barons in the 1987–88 season.

In 1996, the team rebranded themselves as the "Solihull Blaze", and in 2000 they moved from Solihull's Blue Ice Plaza to Coventry's SkyDome Arena, rebranding themselves again as the "Coventry Blaze". As this left Solihull without an ice hockey team for the first time since 1965, the Barons were reformed under a new franchise and returned to their original arena, which had benefited from a much-needed overhaul. Unfortunately, the £1.8m refurbishment was delayed by vandals, leaving the venue operators with a £75,000 damage repair bill, and the grand re-opening was postponed until mid-October 2000.

Despite the newly improved playing facility, the club struggled to survive in the English Premier Ice Hockey League and ultimately dissolved again just two years later in 2002. They were initially replaced by the Milton Keynes Kings, who moved to Solihull from their own hometown due to a dispute with the owners of their arena, and who re-branded themselves the "Solihull MK Kings" to demonstrate the fact that they were now representing both Solihull and Milton Keynes in ice hockey. Once again, however, the team quickly dissolved, playing just a single season of hockey in the British National League before folding. Following the closure of the Solihull MK Kings, a new "Solihull Kings" team was created and placed back in the EPIHL, but yet again this team folded, collapsing after two seasons in 2007.

=== Current team ===
The current Solihull Barons team was formed in 2005, and played their first two seasons in the EPIHL. At the end of the 2006–07 season they were relegated to the English National Ice Hockey League (ENIHL). The Barons currently compete in Northern Division One, known as the "Moralee Conference". The team hold charity games for Birmingham Children's Hospital.

== Club roster 2022–23 ==
(*) Denotes a Non-British Trained player (Import)

Netminders
No.	Nat.	Player	Catches	Date of birth	Place of birth	Acquired	Contract
31	(England)	Sam Hewitt	L	15 February 1991 (age 35)	Coleshill, England	2018 from Telford Tigers	22/23
33	(England)	Benjamin Lee		2002 (age 20)	England	2019	Two-Way
35	(England)	Graham Laverick	L	27 December 1994 (age 31)	Nuneaton, England	2021 from MK Thunder	22/23

Defencemen
No.	Nat.	Player	Shoots	Date of birth	Place of birth	Acquired	Contract
3	(England)	Marcus Maynard	R	13 March 1987 (age 39)	Nottingham, England	2017 from Hull Pirates	22/23
5	(England)	Jordan Stokes	R	16 November 1998 (age 27)	Warwick, England	2021 from MK Lightning	22/23
6	(England)	Richard Crowe	R	6 June 1995 (age 30)	Solihull, England	2010 from Solihull U16	22/23
27	(England)	Kieran Papps	R	14 February 1989 (age 37)	Coventry, England	2022 from Coventry Blaze NIHL	22/23
55	(England)	Bailey Challans	R	17 May 2002 (age 24)	Nottingham, England	2021 from Nottingham Lions	22/23
77	(England)	Andrew Hayward	R	14 February 2000 (age 26)	England	2018 from Coventry Blaze NIHL	22/23
81	(England)	James Moeller		1998 (age 24)	England	2015 from Solihull U18	22/23
97	(England)	Max Soden		11 July 2003 (age 22)	England	2022 from Coventry Blaze NIHL	Two-Way

Forwards
No.	Nat.	Player	Shoots	Date of birth	Place of birth	Acquired	Contract
7	(England)	Sam Chandler	L	16 July 1992 (age 33)	Slough, England	2021 from MK Thunder	22/23
8	(England)	Paul Stanley		22 August 1983 (age 42)	Solihull, England	2018 from Nottingham Lions	22/23
15	(England)	Matthew Maurice	L	5 May 1998 (age 28)	Kenilworth, England	2015 from Coventry U18	22/23
16	(England)	Andrew Whitehouse	R	19 October 1993 (age 32)	Birmingham, England	2011 from Solihull U18	22/23
17	(England)	Richard Slater	R	31 December 1991 (age 34)	Solihull, England	2019	22/23
20	(Finland)	Filip Byfält*	L	22 February 1989 (age 37)	Helsinki, Finland	2022	22/23
24	(England)	Philip Mulcahy	R	13 February 1997 (age 29)	Solihull, England	2019 from Coventry Blaze NIHL	22/23
59	(England)	Jordan Jolly	L	30 April 1999 (age 27)	England	2021 from Telford Tigers	22/23
83	(England)	Brandon Anderton	R	8 March 1998 (age 28)	Birmingham, England	2022 from Telford Tigers 2	22/23
91	(Sweden)	Niklas Ottosson*	L	14 October 1991 (age 34)	Norrköping, Sweden	2015 from Solihull Barons	22/23
93	(England)	Sam Prosser	R	29 January 1993 (age 33)	England	2022 from MK Thunder	22/23

Team Staff
No.	Nat.	Name	Acquired	Role	Place of birth	Joined from
	(England)	Phil Lee	22/23	Head coach	Durham, England

== 2021/22 Outgoing ==
Outgoing
No.	Nat.	Player	Shoots	Date of birth	Place of birth	Leaving For
10	(England)	Daniel Harrison	R	4 July 1992 (age 33)	Stafford, England	Telford Tigers 2, NIHL 2
23	(England)	Daniel Mulcahy	R	1 December 2000 (age 25)	Solihull, England	Telford Tigers, NIHL National
79	(England)	Tom Soar	R	2 January 1993 (age 33)	Nottingham, England	Invicta Dynamos, NIHL 1
94	(Scotland)	James Smith	R	29 June 1994 (age 31)	Dundee, Scotland	Telford Tigers 2, NIHL 2

== Honours ==
- English National Ice Hockey League North Division 2 champions: 2010–2011
- English National Ice Hockey League Laidler Division champions: 2013–2014
- English National Ice Hockey League Laidler Division champions: 2014–2015
- English National Ice Hockey League Laidler Play-Off champions: 2014–2015
- English National Ice Hockey League Midland Cup: 2019-2020
