= Jason Coles =

British ice hockey player and coach

- Born: 16 September 1973 (age 52) Chipping Norton, Oxfordshire, England
- Height: 6 ft 1 in (185 cm)
- Weight: 200 lb (91 kg; 14 st 4 lb)
- Position: Defence
- Shot: Left
- Played for: CoHL; St. Thomas Wildcats; BISL; Bracknell Bees; CHL; Fayetteville Force; ECHL; Pee Dee Pride; Birmingham Bulls
- NHL draft: Undrafted
- Playing career: 1993–2012

Jason Coles (born 16 September 1973) is a British retired professional ice hockey defenceman. He is currently the head of the Wightlink Tigers in the English National Ice Hockey League (NIHL).

Coles played four seasons (1990 - 1994) of major junior hockey in the Ontario Hockey League (OHL), scoring 13 goals and 20 assists for 24 points, while earning 310 penalty minutes, in 186 games played.

He began his professional career during the 1993–94 season with the St. Thomas Wildcats of the Colonial Hockey League. He went on to play 17 seasons, predominantly with the Wightlink Raiders of the English Premier Ice Hockey League, but also with the Bracknell Bees of the British Ice Hockey Superleague, and in the ECHL with the Pee Dee Pride and Birmingham Bulls, before retiring as a player following the 2011–12 season.

With the 2012–13 season, Coles took on the position of head coach with the Wightlink Tigers of the English National Ice Hockey League after being a player-coach with the team the previous year.

== Career statistics ==
			Regular season					Playoffs
Season	Team	League	GP	G	A	Pts	PIM	GP	G	A	Pts	PIM
1990–91	Belleville Bulls	OHL	13	0	1	1	9	—	—	—	—	—
1990–91	Niagara Falls Thunder	OHL	48	0	1	1	62	9	0	0	0	7
1991–92	Niagara Falls Thunder	OHL	58	0	5	5	68	17	1	0	1	9
1992–93	Niagara Falls Thunder	OHL	33	4	6	10	75	—	—	—	—	—
1992–93	Windsor Spitfires	OHL	28	9	6	15	87	—	—	—	—	—
1993–94	Windsor Spitfires	OHL	6	0	1	1	9	—	—	—	—	—
1993–94	St. Thomas Wildcats	CoHL	13	0	0	0	14	—	—	—	—	—
1993–94	Hamilton Kilty B's	OPJHL	18	6	12	18	62	—	—	—	—	—
1995–96	Bracknell Bees	BD1	51	25	37	62	120	—	—	—	—	—
1996–97	Bracknell Bees	BISL	42	1	3	4	66	6	0	0	0	6
1997–98	Fayetteville Force	CHL	3	0	0	0	6	—	—	—	—	—
1997–98	Pee Dee Pride	ECHL	10	0	0	0	18	—	—	—	—	—
1997–98	Birmingham Bulls	ECHL	3	0	0	0	0	—	—	—	—	—
1997–98	Limburger EG	Germany2	7	0	0	0	0	—	—	—	—	—
1998–99	Kingston Hawks	BNL	16	1	0	1	54	6	1	0	1	10
1999–00	Isle of Wight Raiders	EPIHL	2	6	2	8	0	—	—	—	—	—
1999–00	Solihull Blaze	BNL	32	18	12	30	60	8	4	2	6	8
2000–01	Isle of Wight Raiders	EPIHL	29	30	21	51	48	—	—	—	—	—
2001–02	Isle of Wight Raiders	EPIHL	24	14	15	29	118	6	3	4	7	4
2002–03	Isle of Wight Raiders	EPIHL	34	39	38	77	77	6	4	1	5	31
2003–04	Wightlink Raiders	EPIHL	31	28	28	56	106	8	9	8	17	6
2004–05	Wightlink Raiders	EPIHL	29	36	16	52	85	6	4	6	10	16
2005–06	Wightlink Raiders	EPIHL	47	47	22	69	113	—	—	—	—	—
2006–07	Wightlink Raiders	EPIHL	37	24	27	51	81	—	—	—	—	—
2007–08	Wightlink Raiders	EPIHL	40	23	32	55	76	—	—	—	—	—
2008–09	Wightlink Raiders	EPIHL	16	5	6	11	36	—	—	—	—	—
2008–09	Vectis Tigers	ENL 2	7	16	13	29	51	—	—	—	—	—
2009–10	Wightlink Tigers	ENL 2	13	18	20	38	24	—	—	—	—	—
2010–11	Wightlink Tigers	ENL 2	17	36	34	70	22	—	—	—	—	—
2011–12	Wightlink Tigers	ENL 2	11	21	10	31	0	—	—	—	—	—
EPIHL totals			289	252	207	459	740	26	20	19	39	57
