= Māris Ziediņš =

Latvian ice hockey player

- Born: 3 July 1978 (age 47) Talsi, Latvian SSR, Soviet Union
- Height: 5 ft 10 in (178 cm)
- Weight: 174 lb (79 kg; 12 st 6 lb)
- Position: Forward
- Shot: Left
- EPIHL team Former teams: Peterborough Phantoms; Rockford IceHogs; Toledo Storm; Greenville Grrrowl; Stockton Thunder; Chicago Hounds
- National team: Latvia
- Playing career: 1992–2013

Māris Ziediņš (born 3 July 1978 in Talsi, Latvian SSR, Soviet Union) is a Latvian former professional ice hockey forward. He finished his career in the Peterborough Phantoms of the English Premier Ice Hockey League.

Ziediņš spent four years in St. Norbert College before turning pro with the Rockford IceHogs of the United Hockey League. He then went on to have spells in the ECHL with the Toledo Storm, Greenville Grrrowl and the Stockton Thunder before returning to the UHL with the Chicago Hounds. In 2007, Ziediņš moved to the United Kingdom and signed with the Peterborough Phantoms. In 2008–09, he scored 34 goals and 45 assists for 79 points in 54 games for the Phantoms.

Ziediņš represented Latvia in the 2005 World Ice Hockey Championship and the 2006 Winter Olympics.

== Career statistics ==
=== Regular season and playoffs ===
			Regular season					Playoffs
Season	Team	League	GP	G	A	Pts	PIM	GP	G	A	Pts	PIM
1992–93	THK Talsi	LAT	13	9	4	13	4	—	—	—	—	—
1998–99	Green Bay Gamblers	USHL	49	8	10	18	35	6	2	3	5	6
1999–2000	St. Norbert College	NCHA	29	14	13	27	24	—	—	—	—	—
2000–01	St. Norbert College	NCHA	28	21	19	40	8	—	—	—	—	—
2001–02	St. Norbert College	NCHA	29	21	20	41	10	—	—	—	—	—
2002–03	St. Norbert College	NCHA	31	18	19	37	14	—	—	—	—	—
2002–03	Rockford IceHogs	UHL	4	1	0	1	2	—	—	—	—	—
2003–04	Rockford IceHogs	UHL	73	13	22	35	40	—	—	—	—	—
2004–05	Toledo Storm	ECHL	55	16	17	33	25	—	—	—	—	—
2004–05	Greenville Grrrowl	ECHL	12	9	6	15	2	—	—	—	—	—
2005–06	Stockton Thunder	ECHL	57	17	23	40	32	—	—	—	—	—
2006–07	Chicago Hounds	UHL	75	27	17	44	51	4	0	2	2	4
2007–08	Peterborough Phantoms	GBR.2	19	16	24	40	16	6	3	3	6	6
2008–09	Peterborough Phantoms	GBR.2	54	34	45	79	20	—	—	—	—	—
2009–10	Peterborough Phantoms	GBR.2	50	35	44	79	18	2	2	0	2	0
2010–11	Peterborough Phantoms	GBR.2	54	47	39	86	12	3	1	0	1	4
2011–12	Peterborough Phantoms	GBR.2	53	32	33	65	24	2	1	1	2	0
2012–13	Peterborough Phantoms	GBR.2	54	23	33	56	12	2	1	0	1	0
UHL totals			152	41	39	80	93	4	0	2	2	4
ECHL totals			124	42	46	88	59	—	—	—	—	—
GBR.2 totals			284	187	218	405	102	15	8	4	12	10

=== International ===
Year	Team	Event	GP	G	A	Pts	PIM
1996	Latvia	EJC C	4	1	1	2	2
2005	Latvia	WC	6	1	0	1	0
2006	Latvia	OG	5	1	0	1	6
Senior totals			11	2	0	2	6
