= Telford Titans =

- City: Telford, Shropshire, England
- League: ENIHL
- Founded: 2008
- Folded: 2014
- Home arena: Telford Ice Rink
- Colours: White, orange, black
- Owner(s): Voluntary
- Website: www.telfordtitans.com

The Telford Titans were an English ice hockey team that played in the English National Ice Hockey League (ENIHL). They were originally formed as the Telford Tigers ENL.

== History ==
In 2007, the English Premier Ice Hockey League (EPIHL) Telford Tigers introduced a second team into the English National Ice Hockey League (ENIHL), known as the Telford Tigers ENL; due to changing age restrictions of the under-19s team becoming an under-18s team.

In 2008, the Telford Tigers EPL and ENL split ownership due to time constraints on the owners, with the two clubs still working closely together to promote ice hockey in Telford. The team was renamed the Telford Titans in September 2008 and continued to operate under this name until the team folded in August 2014, due to a mass exodus of players and management staff.
