= Altrincham Ice Rink =

Former ice arena in Manchester, England

The original Altrincham Ice Rink was situated on Devonshire Road. Opened in 1960, the rink was home to the Altrincham Aces and original Trafford Tigers Ice Hockey teams, as well as figure and speed skaters.

The rink was closed in March 2003, after 43 years, when it was sold by the owners to a property developer. A housing estate now stands on the site of the former rink.

The rink's replacement, the Altrincham Ice Dome, opened in February 2007.

== Venue details ==
Ice Pad: 190 ft x 85 ft
Spectator Capacity: 1,800
Facilities: Skate hire, bar, rink shop.

The rink did not feature plexiglass around the top of its boards, but utilised netting instead.
