= Sutton Sting =

Ice hockey team in Nottinghamshire, England

- City: Sutton-in-Ashfield
- League: NIHL
- Conference: Laidler
- Division: North 2
- Founded: 2009
- Home arena: Lammas Leisure Centre / Ice Sheffield
- Colors: Yellow & Black
- Head coach: Matt Jeffcock

Championships
- Division titles: 1 - 2017/18 NIHL North 2 Champions

The Sutton Sting are an amateur English ice hockey team based out of the Lammas Leisure Centre at Sutton-in-Ashfield in Nottinghamshire. The Sting compete in the National Ice Hockey League as a member of the Laidler conference (Division 2 North). Due to their home rink at Sutton being considered too small for match hockey, the team play their home fixtures at IceSheffield.

The team was founded in 2009, three years after the junior club of the same name was established, to give players a pathway from U10s into senior ice hockey. They primarily source players who progress through their junior teams which enter into the English Ice Hockey Association Junior Leagues system.

The team began life in the English National Ice Hockey League (ENL) North 2 for the 2009–10 season. After 3 years the club won the 2011-12 English National Ice Hockey League North Promotion Playoff Champions against the Nottingham Lions and elected for promotion to the National Ice Hockey League North 1.

In the clubs first season in NIHL 1 they qualified for but were eliminated from the playoffs in the semi finals, they competed from 2012 to 2017 without any further playoff success.

Following the closure of the 2016–17 season the Sting elected to drop down into the NIHL 2 where they were crowned league champions, but went on to be defeated in the playoff finals by the Widnes Wild.

Sting returned to the NIHL 1 North for the 2018–19 season where they remained for a further year.

Following a brief hiatus during the COVID-19 pandemic, the Sting returned to the NIHL 2 for the 2021–22 season. Their first run out saw them finish 3rd in the league, followed by a playoff semi-final loss to eventual champions the Hull Jets. A similar story followed for the 2022–23 season where the Sting once again finished 3rd in the league, followed by a playoff semi-final loss to eventual champions the Telford Tigers 2.

Following the expansion of the league to 10 teams in 2023, the Sting finished in second place beating the Coventy NIHL Blaze, only to lose out in the playoff final to newcomers Billingham Buccaneers. The closure of the 2024–25 season also saw the Sting defeated in the playoff finals by the Telford Tigers 2.

== Season-by-season record ==
Note: GP = Games played, W = Wins, L = Losses, T = Ties, OTL = Overtime losses, Pts = Points, GF = Goals for, GA = Goals against

Season	League	GP	W	L	T	OTL	Pts	GF	GA	Finish	Post-season
2009-10	ENL 2	24	5	17	2	-	12	68	142	6	No playoffs held
2010-11	ENL 2	24	14	9	1	-	29	122	124	2	No playoffs held
2011-12	ENL 2	28	22	6	0	-	44	228	88	2	Placement game win
2012-13	NIHL 1	30	15	6	9	-	39	121	101	3	Semifinal loss
2013-14	NIHL 1	28	15	12	1	-	31	133	100	5	DNQ
2014-15	NIHL 1	24	9	12	3	-	21	82	85	5	DNQ
2015-16	NIHL 1	30	10	18	2	-	22	96	118	7	DNQ
2016-17	NIHL 1	28	9	16	3	-	21	83	106	6	DNQ
2017-18	NIHL 2	36	28	5	-	3	59	218	110	1	Final loss
2018-19	NIHL 1	36	10	23	-	3	23	136	235	8	QF loss
2019-20	NIHL 1	24	13	10	-	1	26	116	119	4	Cancelled
2020-21	-	-	-	-		-	-	-	-	-	Inactive
2021-22	NIHL 2	14	8	5	-	1	17	53	47	3	SF loss
2022-23	NIHL 2	28	13	10	-	5	31	95	89	3	SF loss
2023-24	NIHL 2	32	26	5	-	1	54	200	79	2	Final loss
2024-25	NIHL 2	26	23	3	-	-	69	171	48	2	Final loss
2025-26	NIHL 2	-	-	-	-	-	-	-	-	-	-

== Current Squad ==
Squad for 2025–26 National Ice Hockey League North 2 season

Netminders
No.	Nat.	Player	Catches	Date of birth	Place of birth	Acquired	Contract
99	(England)	Lewis King	L	2001		2017
28	(England)	Jack Hargreaves	L	2007		2025	Junior
68	(England)	Nathaniel Bell	L	1998		2025

Defencemen
No.	Nat.	Player	Shoots	Date of birth	Place of birth	Acquired	Contract
8	(England)	Sam Colton		2002		2023
20	(Wales)	Josh Humphreys		2000		2021
84	(England)	Joel Bark		2004		2022
34	(England)	Benjamin Marples	L	2001		2017
65	(Northern Ireland)	Jamie Scott	R	1998	Belfast, Northern Ireland	2024
6	(England)	James Spencer	R	2001	Sutton-in-Ashfield, England	2021
94	(England)	Jacob Truswell (A)		2002		2019
78	(England)	Jasper Wright		2005		2022

Forwards
No.	Nat.	Player	Shoots	Date of birth	Place of birth	Acquired	Contract
9	(England)	Cameron Akers	L	2000	Sheffield, England	2021
18	(England)	Ryan Apsley (A)	R	2001	Chesterfield, England	2021
7	(England)	Adam Brooke-Smith	R	2002	Chesterfield, England	2022
72	(England)	Joseph Colton	R	1998		2016
44	(England)	Justin Dennison	R	2006		2025
14	(England)	Ryan Fraley	R	1998		2025
48	(England)	Cameron Glasby	L	1999	Worksop, England	2015
80	(England)	Lawson Glasby (C)	R	1996	Worksop, England	2021
17	(England)	Morgan Glasby		2001	Worksop, England	2021
88	(England)	Alfie Hancock		2008		2025	Junior
19	(England)	Matthew Jeffcock	R	1988	Sheffield, England	2014
86	(England)	Elliott Meadows		1997		2015
76	(England)	Lewis Miles		2004		2025
25	(England)	Calum Russell		2002		2021
16	(England)	Charlie Saunders	R	1998		2014
12	(England)	Sebastian Staley		2008		2024	Junior
11	(England)	Oliver Watson	L	1998	Rotherham, England	2021
33	(England)	Alexander Williams		2005		2022

== Club Records ==
=== League titles ===
- NIHL 2: 1 (2017/18)

=== Individual records ===
- Most Games Played: James Goodman (211)
- Most Goals Scored (All Time): Ryan Johnson (90)
- Most Assists (All Time): Simon Butterworth (196)
- Most Points Scored (All Time): Simon Butterworth (267)
- Most Penalty Minutes (All Time): James Goodman (617)
- Most Goals Scored in a Season: Richard Oliver (44) (2011/12)
- Most Assists in a Season: Simon Butterworth (66) (2011/12)
- Most Points Scored in a Season: Simon Butterworth (88) (2011/12)
- Most Penalty Minutes in a Season: Benjamin Wilson (203) (2010/11)
