= Sheffield Scimitars (1986) =

- City: Sheffield, England
- League: EPIHL
- Founded: 1986
- Operated: 1986–2010
- Home arena: iceSheffield; Capacity: 1500; Ice size: 200 ft x 100 ft
- Colours: White, Black, and Red
- Owners: Gary Apsley and Ian Johnson
- Head coach: Jon Rowbotham
- Captain: Peter Slamiar
- Affiliates: Sheffield Spartans

Sheffield Scimitars were a semi-professional English ice hockey team, formed originally in 1986 as an Under 21 side. They initially played at the small 500 capacity Sheffield Ice Sports Centre, more commonly known as Queens Road, and became a senior side in the 1990s, playing in the ENIHL. The team moved to the iceSheffield complex upon it opening in 2002, where they became successful in the ENIHL and made the step-up to the EPL in 2005–06. Their mascot was a male hockey player with a large smiling head named "Scimi", shirt number 00. In July 2010, the team ceased operations, and was replaced by the Sheffield Steeldogs, who took over the Scimitars' spot in the EPL.

== Honours ==
=== 2002–2003 ===
- ENHL Northern League Champions
- ENHL Northern Cup Winners

=== 2003–2004 ===
- ENHL National Champions
- ENHL National Cup Winners
- ENHL Northern League Play-off Champions
- ENHL Northern Cup Winners

=== 2004–2005 ===
- ENHL National Champions
- ENHL National Cup Winners
- ENHL Northern League Play-off Champions
- ENHL Northern League Champions
- ENHL Northern Cup Winners

=== 2005–2006 ===
- Yorkshire Cup Winners
