= Hull Arena =

Ice hockey arena in Kingston upon Hull, England

Coordinates: 53.737300°N 0.343500°W

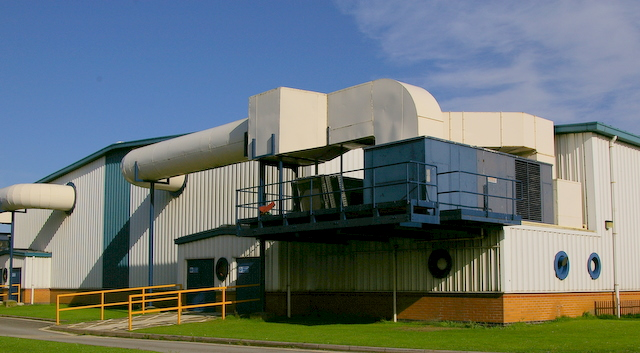
- Interactive map of Hull Arena
- Former names: Humberside Ice Arena
- Location: Kingston Park; Kingston Street; Hull; HU1 2DZ; England
- Owner: Hull City Council
- Operator: Hull Culture and Leisure
- Capacity: 2,000 (seated); 3,750 (including floor)
- Field size: 60 by 30 metres (197 ft × 98 ft)

Construction
- Opened: 13 September 1988
- Renovated: 2020–2021
- Cost: £2.6 million
- Builder: Houlton Construction

Tenants
- Hull Seahawks (NIHL) (2022–present); Hull Jets (NIHL 1 (North)) (2013–present); Hull Stingrays (EIHL) (2003–2015)

Website
- Official website

Hull Arena (originally Humberside Ice Arena and known locally as the Hull Ice Arena) is an ice rink, in the city of Kingston upon Hull, England. It offers an Olympic-sized pad of 60 by 30 metres (197 by 98 ft). It is also used for other sports, trade fairs and as a concert venue, for which it has a maximum capacity of 3,750.

== History ==
=== Planning and construction ===
The building had a protracted development, with planning disputes delaying construction between 1982 and 1986. A first iteration of the arena was budgeted at £5 million in December 1982 and originally planned to be built on the site of a car park along Ferensway in the city centre, intended to be a joint venture between the county of Humberside and the city of Kingston upon Hull. However, Conservative Party opposition councillors at Humberside County Council criticised the planned arena as being too costly and unnecessary, as well as fearing that the Ferensway site could be prone to traffic and parking problems, and in November 1983, the ruling Labour Party voted in a secret ballot in favour of cancelling this first iteration of the arena.

A second iteration of the arena, a mixed-use site budgeted at £3.5 million, was announced in January 1985 to be built near Humber Street as part of a regeneration scheme centred on the city's old docklands, with Humberside County Council stepping back from running the arena and instead awarding Kingston upon Hull City Council £1 million in grant funding for its construction. These plans did not materialise as a result of further Conservative opposition following a change in county council composition in the 1985 elections to no overall control.

A third iteration, now only an ice rink with a seating capacity of 2,000, was announced in 1986 on the site of the Kingston Clinic on Beverley Road, which was to be constructed at a budget of £2.5 million and operated by Humberside County Council. As a result of this change of plan, Hull City Council was made to return their £1 million grant to the county council. These plans were abandoned by the county council after lengthy delays emerged and after city councillors criticised the location of the arena as being a "hair-brained cockeyed scheme", and after plans to build the arena on The Circle cricket ground on Anlaby Road were ruled out, the city council offered the county council the use of a site near Albert Dock that had been previously selected in 1985. In November 1986, approval was finally granted by Humberside County Council for the construction of the arena at the city council's preferred site, seating 2,000 and budgeted at £2 648,000.

The building's ceremonial cornerstone was unveiled by Queen Elizabeth II during a royal visit to the city on 18 July 1987. It was inaugurated on 14 September 1988 by former Olympic figure skating champion John Curry.

=== Refurbishment ===
The venue closed in March 2020 for renovations worth £1.5 million, which ended up lasting a year and a half. The ice sheet was relaid, while the locker rooms and lavatories were renovated. A new lighting rig consisting of eighty spotlights and a clearer sound system were also installed.

The building is nonetheless viewed as outdated and in need of replacement. A new ice rink was considered as part of the former redevelopment of the former Co-operative Building on Albion Street, however plans to incorporate it into the new real estate development were dropped by Hull City Council in favour of an urban park in October 2021. A 2021 publication pegged the Arena's yearly attendance, which has varied depending on the caliber of resident ice hockey teams, at 147,000.

== Ice sports ==
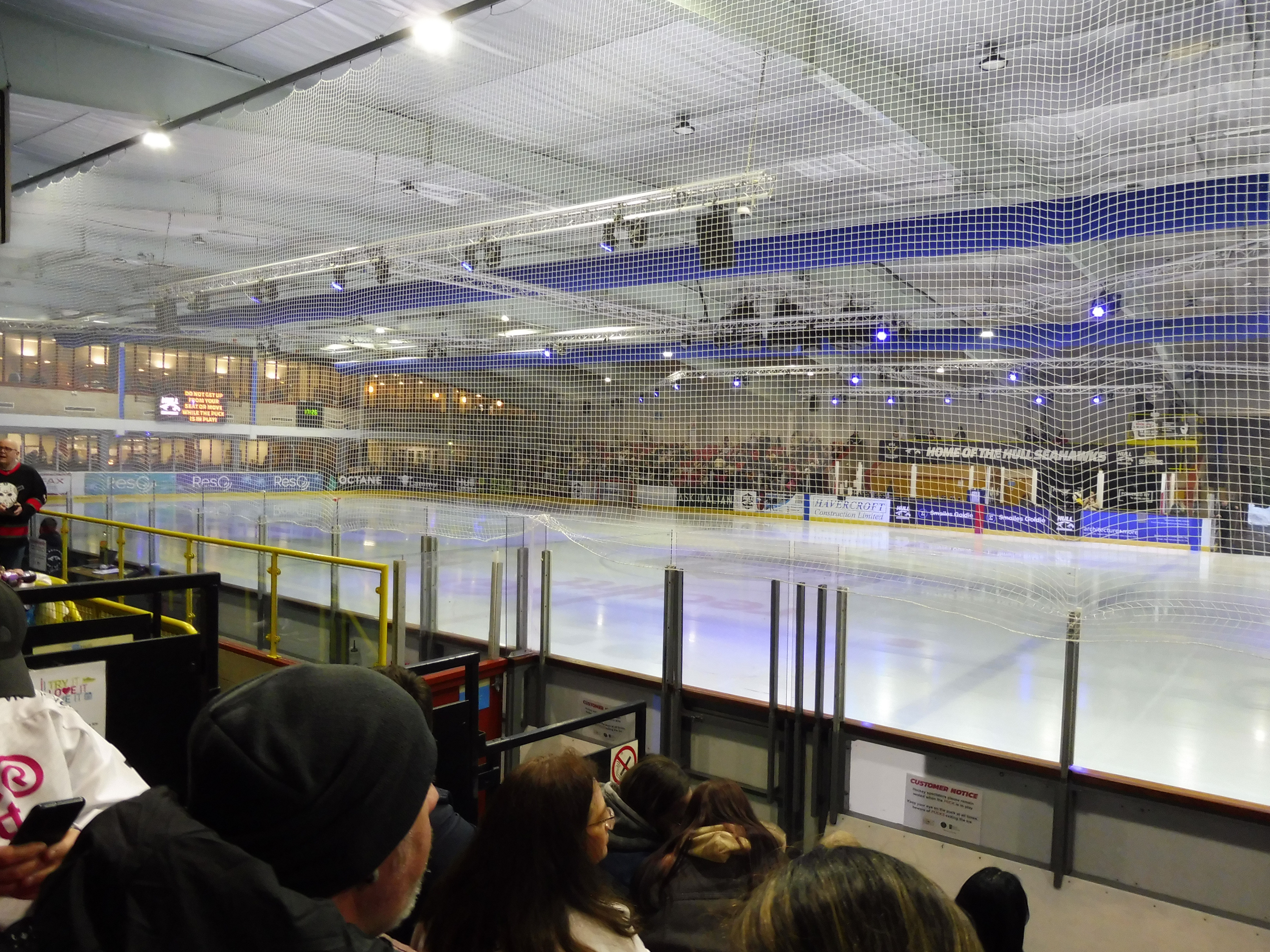
The interior of Hull Arena prior to an ice hockey match in March 2026

Hull Arena has been the home of all ice hockey teams within the city, including the Humberside Seahawks, Hull Thunder, and Hull Stingrays of the BNL, the Hull Stingrays of the Elite League, and the Hull Pirates of the NIHL. The current teams include the Hull Seahawks of the NIHL and the Hull Jets of the NIHL North 1.

== Other events ==
The Arena hosts boxing events for the Matchroom Boxing promotions stable with Hull boxers Luke Campbell and Tommy Coyle amongst those to compete. It was previously used to hold such events in April 1997, March 1998 and June 1998 with boxers including Paul Ingle, Clinton Woods, Howard Eastman and Scott Harrison competing.

The Arena has also hosted WWF/WWE pro wrestling on multiple occasions, such as the Hart Attack '94, Full Metal '95 and Wrestlemania Revenge 2005 tours.

The 2011 edition of the World Masters darts tournament was played at the arena.

Among music acts who have appeared at the Arena are the Arctic Monkeys, Faithless, Kings of Leon, Oasis, Robbie Williams, Ed Sheeran and The Libertines.
