= Wightlink Tigers =

- City: Ryde, Isle of Wight
- League: NIHL
- Conference: Southern
- Division: 2
- Founded: 2007
- Folded: 2016
- Home arena: Ryde Arena; Capacity: 1000; Ice size: 165ft x 80ft
- Colours: White, Orange, Black

Franchise history
- 2007–2009: Vectis Tigers
- 2009–2016: Wightlink Tigers

The Wightlink Tigers was an amateur English ice hockey team from the Isle of Wight. The team was founded in July 2007 as the Vectis Tigers, and played at Ryde Arena, Isle of Wight. From the 2009–10 season onwards the team played as the Wightlink Tigers, after sponsors Wightlink. In its last competitive season (2015–16) the Tigers played in Division 2 of the National Ice Hockey League (NIHL) Southern Conference (SC). Many of the team's roster moved to the newly formed Wightlink Buccaneers, which debuted in the 2016–17 season in NIHL SC Division 2.

== Season-by-season record ==
Note: GP = Games played, W = Wins, L = Losses, T = Ties, Pts = Points, GF = Goals for, GA = Goals against

Season	League	GP	W	L	T	Pts	GF	GA	Finish	Playoffs
2007–08	ENL	16	1	15	0	2	28	162	9th	Did not qualify for playoffs
2008–09	ENL 2	32	20	11	1	41	204	144	2nd	Placement game loss (Manchester Phoenix ENL)
2009–10	ENL 2	20	6	14	0	12	100	142	8th	Playoffs not held
2010–11	ENL 2	24	14	9	1	29	189	145	4th	Playoffs not held
2011–12	ENL 2	24	9	15	0	18	118	131	11th	Playoffs not held
2012–13	NIHL 2	22	15	7	0	30	135	90	2nd	Playoffs not held
2013–14	NIHL 2	22	7	12	3	17	79	99	8th	Playoffs not held
2014–15	NIHL 2	16	5	10	1	11	56	88	4th	Did not qualify for playoffs
2015–16	NIHL 2	14	1	12	1	2	49	142	5th	Did not qualify for playoffs
