= Telford Ice Rink =

Ice rink in Telford, Shropshire, England

Coordinates: 52.6735°N 2.4460°W

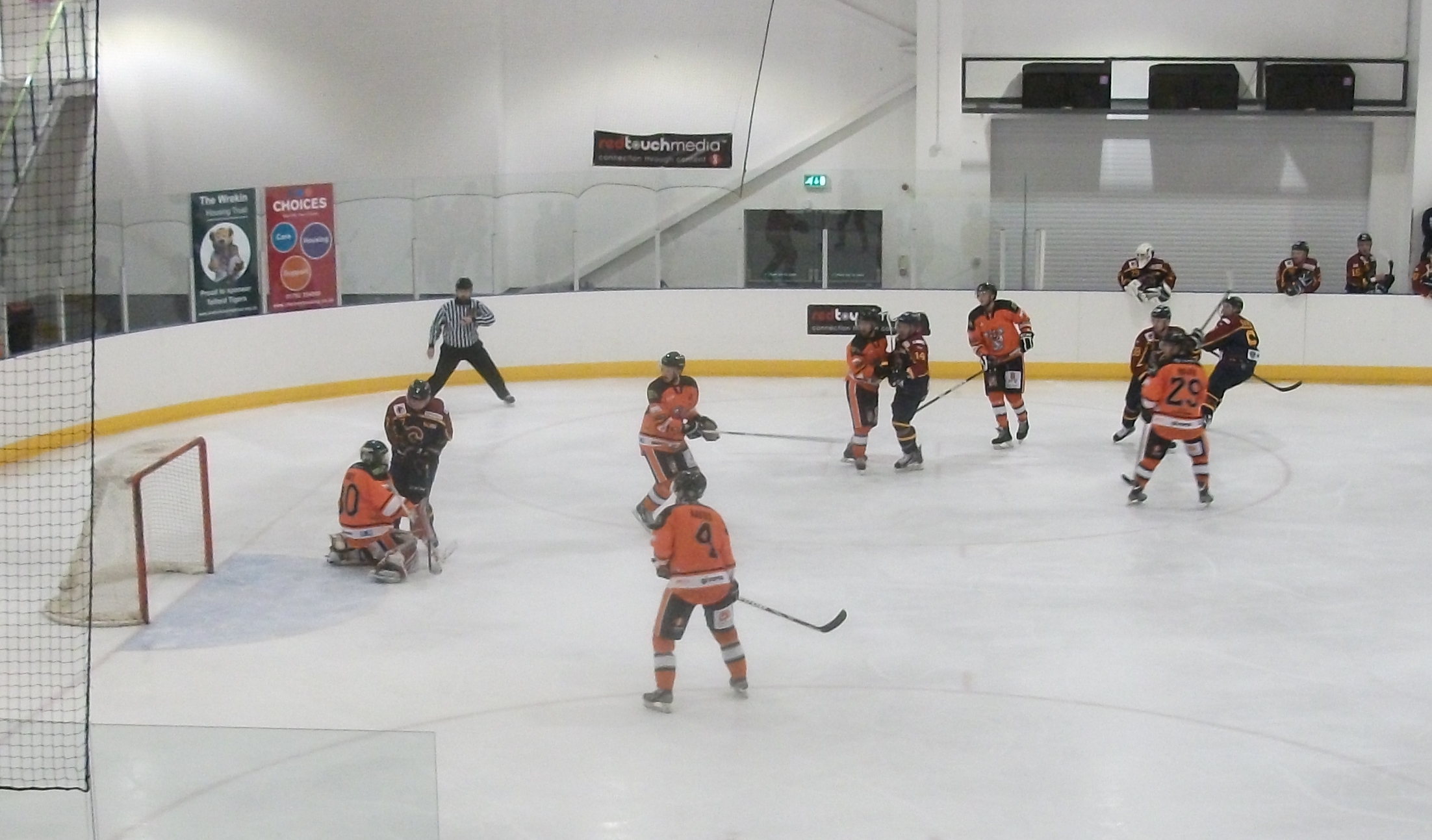

Telford Ice Rink is located in the £250m Southwater Complex in Telford, Shropshire, England. The ice rink is home to National Ice Hockey League team the Telford Tigers. From 2008 to 2014, it was also home to the English National Ice Hockey League team the Telford Titans.

The ice rink was opened in October 1984. It underwent a £4 million refurbishment in 2012, with the addition of a soft play area, as part of the wider Southwater development.

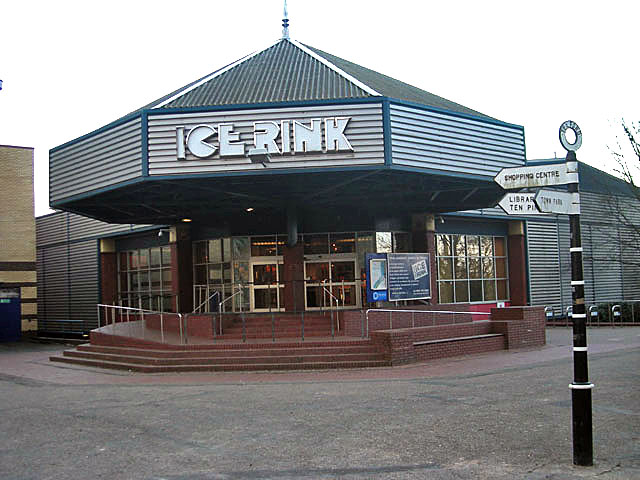
Ice rink entrance in 2010. The porch was demolished as part of the 2012 refurbishment.

== Address ==
Saint Quentin Gate, Telford, Shropshire, TF3 4JQ, England

== See also ==
- Telford Tigers
