= Guildford Phoenix =

Ice hockey team in Surrey, England

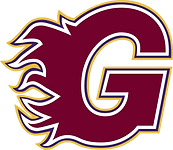
- City: Guildford, Surrey
- League: NIHL 2 South (Wilkinson) Division
- Founded: 2017
- Home arena: Guildford Spectrum (capacity: 2,200)
- Colors: Maroon, Blue
- Head coach: Stuart Potts
- Captain: Nick Minhinnick
- Affiliates: Guildford Flames
- Website: GJIHC Phoenix

Franchise history
- 2017–present: Guildford Phoenix

The Guildford Phoenix are an ice hockey team based in Guildford, England. They currently play in the NIHL 2 South West Division. The Guildford Phoenix are a minor league affiliate of the Guildford Flames of the Elite Ice Hockey League.

The Phoenix is the senior men's team of the Guildford Junior Ice Hockey club and was set up as part of the progression pathway for Guildford junior players into senior hockey. After one or two seasons with the Phoenix, many players have gone on to play in the National league or NIHL 1.

Phoenix gained extensive media coverage in October 2019, following the signing of former Chelsea and Arsenal goalkeeper Petr Čech.

== Season-by-season record ==
Season	League	GP	W	T	L	OTW	OTL	Pts.	Rank	Postseason
2017–18	NIHL 2	26	14	-	10	1	1	31	6th	Semi-finalist
2018–19	NIHL 2	28	16	-	9	1	2	36	5th	Did not make playoffs
2019–20	NIHL 2	20	17	-	1	1	0	36	1st	Playoffs Cancelled
2020–21	NIHL 2									season cancelled
2021–22	NIHL 2	22	19	-	1	1	1	41	1st	Champions
2022–23	NIHL 2	24	20	-	3	0	1	41	2nd	Semi-finalist
2023–24	NIHL 2	22	21	-	1	0	0	42	1st	Semi-finalist
2024–25	NIHL 2	18	15	-	0	2	1	50	1st	Finalist
2025–26	NIHL 2	22	19	-	2	0	1	58	1st	National and Divisional Champions

== Roster 2025/26 ==
Netminders
no.	Nat	Player	Age	Born	Birthplace	HT	WT	catches	Junior Club
31	(England)	Jake Stoodley	28	1997	Guildford	188	91	L	Guildford
20	(England)	Oscar Minton	33	2009					
71	(Latvia)	Dima Volkovs	17	2009		183	91	L	Latvia

Defencemen
no.	Nat	Player	Age	Born	Birthplace	HT	WT	shoots	Junior Club
4	(England)	Monty Gailer	28	1997	Chichester	182	80	L	Guildford
6	(England)	Matt Tull	26	1999	Southampton	178	77		Guildford
16	(England)	James Buckingham	29	1997					Slough
24	(England)	Logan Hill	21	2005	Guildford			R	Guildford
25	(England)	Luke Tull	31	1995	Southampton	175	76		Guildford
43	(England)	Jed Sherrington	25	2001					Guildford
40	(England)	Joe Stephenson	28	1998	Farnborough	180	88		Guildford

Forwards
no.	Nat	Player	Age	Born	Birthplace	HT	WT	shoots	Junior Club
7	(Slovakia)	Theo Sire	21	2004	Bratislava	168		R	Guildford
9	(England)	Sol Stoodley	23	2003		185	80		Guildford
12	(England)	Sean Reynolds	18	2008		175	80	R	Guildford
13	(England)	Jared Vigar	20	2006					Guildford
15	(England)	Liam Kennington	18	2008		187	85		Guildford
17	(England)	Josh Sherrington	28	1998	Frimley	183	95	R	Guildford
18	(England)	Josh Abbot	30	1996	Luton	180	85	R	Guildford
19	(England)	Oliver Denis 'A'	30	1995	Chichester	177	74	R	Guildford
22	(England)	Nick Minhinnick 'C'	33	1993	Chertsey	172	85	R	Guildford
23	(England)	Jacob Rondeau-Smith 'A'	28	1997		173	60	R	Guildford
27	(England)	Harry Wright	27	1998					Basingstoke
28	(England)	Jack Woodstock	27	1998	Hounslow	183	71		Guildford
29	(England)	Scott Bailey 'A'	29	1997	London	185	779	R	Guildford
36	(United Kingdom)	Daniil Sakantsev	17	2009					
51	(England)	Charlie Bell	30	1996					Guildford

== All Time Scoring Leaders (up to /incl 2025/26) ==
Points
Player	GP	Pts
Josh Abbott	134	321
Andy Hemmings	81	242
Oliver Denis	158	220
Jared Lane	74	186
Nick Minhinnick	140	183
Joshua Sherrington	107	183
Jacob Rondeau-Smith	156	170
Luke Tull	168	136
Montgomery Gailer	170	128
Sol Stoodley	69	114

Goals
Player	GP	Goals
Joshua Abbott	134	169
Oliver Denis	158	90
Nick Minhinnick	140	84
Josh Sherrington	76	62
Andrew Hemmings	81	78
Jacob Rondeau-Smith	69	62
Solomon Stoodley	140	57
Jared Lane	74	61
Theo Sire	72	50
Jared Vigar	74	49

Assists
Player	GP	Assist
Andrew Hemmings	81	164
Josh Abbott	134	152
Oliver Denis	158	130
Jared Lane	74	125
Jacob Rondeau-Smith	156	107
Joshua Sherrington	107	102
Montgomery Gailer	170	102
Nick Minhinnick	140	99
Luke Tull	168	91
Theo Sire	75	60
