= Northern Ireland Ice Hockey Association =

Northern Ireland
- Association name: Northern Ireland Ice Hockey Association

Ice Hockey Northern Ireland, abbreviated to IHNI, is responsible for the administration of all ice hockey in Northern Ireland, and was set up in early 2011.

The body consists of 5 teams, Belfast Ice Foxes, Northern Ireland Tridents, Northern Ireland Prowlers, Belfast Spitfires and the Castlereagh Spartans.

IHNI runs an in-house round robin style tournament for both a Winter and Summer Cup, consisting of 6 games per team in the 'League period', to set your place for 'Playoff' semi-finals in the format of 1st vs 4th and 2nd vs 3rd.

The winners of the semi-finals go on to play in the Final.
