= National Ice Hockey League =

Ice hockey league in the UK

- Sport: Ice hockey
- Founded: 1996
- No. of teams: 47
- Country: United Kingdom
- Level on pyramid: 2–4
- Website: englandicehockey.com/nihl-leagues/

The National Ice Hockey League (NIHL) is a set of semi-professional ice hockey leagues administered by the English Ice Hockey Association. It is currently the second tier of British ice hockey, below the Elite Ice Hockey League. Formerly called the English National Ice Hockey League (ENIHL), it was renamed in 2012 to recognise the inclusion of several teams from Scotland and Wales.

The English Ice Hockey Association announced a new structure of the men's senior league for the 2019/20 season, at a meeting of NIHL clubs in Warwickshire. A new ten-team division was approved to sit above the existing Division 1 in North and South, to be known as the National League.

In the inaugural 2019–2020 season the National League comprised Basingstoke Bison, Bracknell Bees, Hull Pirates, Leeds Knights, MK Lightning, Peterborough Phantoms, Romford Raiders, Sheffield Steeldogs, Swindon Wildcats and Telford Tigers. There is no promotion to or relegation from the National League.

Below the National League, the leagues are split into two regions, North and South, meaning teams do not have to travel long distances for away games. Each region has 2 divisions, with promotion and relegation between the divisions in each region.

== History ==
The ENIHL was formed in 1996; following the dissolution of the British Hockey League (BHL), and the creation of the Ice Hockey Superleague and the British National League (BNL) as the top two tiers of British hockey. The ENIHL served as the third tier of hockey; operating below the BNL.

=== Tiers of British ice hockey since 1995 ===
1995–96	1996–97	1997–98	1998–99	1999–00	2002–03	2005–06	2012–13	2017–18	2019–Current
BHL Premier Division	Ice Hockey Superleague	Ice Hockey Superleague	Ice Hockey Superleague	Ice Hockey Superleague	Elite Ice Hockey League	Elite Ice Hockey League	Elite Ice Hockey League	Elite Ice Hockey League	Elite Ice Hockey League
BHL Division 1	British National League	British National League	British National League	British National League	British National League	English Premier Ice Hockey League	English Premier Ice Hockey League	National Ice Hockey League	National Ice Hockey League National League
	ENIHL	National Division	Premier Division/League	English Premier Ice Hockey League	English Premier Ice Hockey League	ENIHL	National Ice Hockey League		National Ice Hockey League; League 1
	ENIHL	ENIHL	ENIHL	English Premier Ice Hockey League	English Premier Ice Hockey League	ENIHL	National Ice Hockey League		National Ice Hockey League; League 1
				ENIHL	ENIHL				National Ice Hockey League; League 2

Following its inaugural season, an upper tier within the ENIHL was founded, so as to serve as a league for the members of the BNL who could not afford to remain in that league due to the increased operating costs; but at the same time played ice hockey to a higher standard that of the other ENIHL teams. This division was originally known as the National Division, and during the 1997–98 season the teams in this division played dual schedules; a series of games solely amongst themselves, and another amongst all of the teams which fell under the jurisdiction of the ENIHL at this time. Solihull Blaze won the league and play-off trophies of both formats during this inaugural season.

At the start of the 1998–99 season the divisions, whilst still both under the ENIHL umbrella, performed in their own separate competitions; and the national division adopted the name Premier Division, and later on became known as the Premier League. By the end of the season the league had established itself outside of the ENIHL as the English Premier Ice Hockey League (EPIHL); reducing the ENIHL to the fourth level of Britain's ice hockey pyramid.

However, in 2005 the BNL disbanded, leaving the EPIHL to take its place as the second tier of the national game and, consequently, re-establishing the ENIHL as the third tier of British ice hockey. In April 2007, the EIHA lowered the upper age limit within the junior leagues, abolishing the under 19 age limit to become under 18. Due to the large gap from junior level to the EPIHL, many teams were forced to enter a reserve team into the ENIHL. This increased the size of the league from 22 teams through to 30 teams for the 2007–08 season. Later in the 2007 off-season, the EIHA suggested introducing an under 25 age limit across the league. However, this age limit was removed within weeks in favour of a drive towards developing players. The ENIHL was restructured for the 2008/2009 season into two regional divisions North and South, with two leagues in each regional division.

Following the 2012–13 the league was renamed the National Ice Hockey League, removing the word English due to non-English teams participating. In 2013, it was agreed at the EIHA AGM to restructure the Northern league into two conferences; Moralee and Laidler. The split was done primarily on regions and neither conference was regarded as being higher than the other. However, at the following year's AGM, it was agreed to return to a tiered Division 1 and Division 2 format. However, the conference names remained in place with Division 1 taking the Moralee Conference title and Division 2 the Laidler Conference title.

In 2014, it was agreed at the EIHA AGM to restructure the Southern Division 2 league to have Western and Eastern Conferences. Due to the odd-number of teams in the league, the Eastern Conference had six teams while the Western Conference had five teams. Both conferences were run completely separately and each winner was only regarded as being the conference winner, with no implication of one conference winner being regarded as the league winner. A two-round playoff format was introduced at the end of the season to determine a league-wide winner. The winner of the playoffs would then be the team promoted to Division 1. In 2017, the two conferences were reunited.

== Players ==
The league itself is considered to be a development league, and as such the players are normally amateur. Many teams have affiliate teams in higher leagues. Other teams are aligned with junior ice hockey clubs, and exist to ensure that when players hit 18 there is still a possibility for them to play competitive hockey if they have not joined a professional team.

== The system ==
Teams in the 2026–27 NIHL
Teams in the 2026–27 NIHL Division 1
Blue: North (Moralee); Red: South (Britton)
London-based 2026–27 NIHL Division 1 teams
Teams in the 2026–27 NIHL Division 2
Blue: North (Laidler); Red: South (Wilkinson);
London-based 2026–27 NIHL Division 2 teams

Level	League(s)/Division(s)	
2	National League; 12 clubs – no promotions, no relegations	
3	Division 1 – North (Moralee); 7 clubs – no promotions, no relegations	Division 1 – South (Britton); 9 clubs – no promotions, no relegations
4	Division 2 – North (Laidler); 9 clubs – no promotions, no relegations	Division 2 – South (Wilkinson); 9 clubs – no promotions, no relegations

=== National League ===
National Ice Hockey League (Note: The Berkshire Bees announced they would sit out the 2025/26 season with the intention to ice a team again in the 2026/27 season.)
	Club	Founded	City	Arena	Capacity	Year Entered
(England)	Basingstoke Bison	1988	Basingstoke	Planet Ice Basingstoke	2,000	2019
(England)	Bristol Pitbulls	2009	Bristol (Patchway)	Planet Ice Bristol	2,600	2022
(England)	Hull Seahawks	2022	Hull	Hull Arena	2,000	2022
(England)	Leeds Knights	2019	Leeds	Planet Ice Leeds	2,000	2019
(England)	Milton Keynes Lightning	2002	Milton Keynes	Planet Ice Milton Keynes	2,800	2019
(England)	Peterborough Phantoms	2002	Peterborough	Planet Ice Peterborough	1,500	2019
(England)	Romford Raiders	1987	London (Romford)	Sapphire Ice and Leisure Centre	1,200	2019
(England)	Sheffield Steeldogs	2010	Sheffield	iceSheffield	1,500	2019
(Scotland)	Solway IHC	1998	Dumfries	Dumfries Ice Bowl	1,000	2023
(England)	Swindon Wildcats	1986	Swindon	Link Centre	2,800	2019
(England)	Telford Tigers	1985	Telford	Telford Ice Rink	2,300	2019

=== Division 1 ===
North
	Club	Founded	Location	Arena	Capacity	Year Entered
(England)	Billingham Stars	1971	Stockton-on-Tees (Billingham)	Billingham Forum	1,200	2012
(England)	Blackburn Hawks	1990	Blackburn	Planet Ice Blackburn	3,200	2020
(Wales)	Deeside Dragons	1998	Deeside (Queensferry)	Deeside Leisure Centre	1,500	2022
(England)	Hull Jets	2013	Hull	Hull Arena	2,000	2012
(England)	Leeds Knights 2	2024	Leeds	Planet Ice Leeds	2,000	2024
(England)	Nottingham Lions	2000	Nottingham	National Ice Centre	7,500	2017
(England)	Sheffield Scimitars	2010	Sheffield	iceSheffield	1,500	2021
(England)	Solihull Barons	2005	Solihull	Planet Ice Solihull	2,200	2015
(England)	Telford Tigers 2	2017	Telford	Telford Ice Rink	2,300	2017
(England)	Widnes Wild	2013	Widnes	Planet Ice Widnes	600	2021
South
	Club	Founded	Location	Arena	Capacity	Year Entered
(Wales)	Cardiff Fire	2015	Cardiff	Vindico Arena	3,088	2019
(England)	Chelmsford Chieftains	1987	Chelmsford	Riverside Ice and Leisure Centre	1,200	2019
(England)	Invicta Dynamos	1997	Gillingham	Planet Ice Gillingham	1,000	2012
(England)	Romford Buccaneers	2018	London (Romford)	Sapphire Ice and Leisure Centre	1,200	2019
(England)	Slough Jets	1986	Slough	Slough Ice Arena	1,000	2019
(England)	Solent Devils	2003	Gosport	Planet Ice Gosport	350	2019
(England)	Streatham IHC	1932	London (Streatham)	Streatham Ice and Leisure Centre	1,000	2012
(England)	Swindon Wildcats 2	2006	Swindon	Link Centre	2,800	2019

=== Division 2 ===
North
	Club	Founded	Location	Arena	Capacity	Year Entered
(England)	Altrincham Aces	1961	Manchester (Altrincham)	Planet Ice Altrincham	2,440	2015
(England)	Billingham Buccaneers	2023	Stockton-on-Tees (Billingham)	Billingham Forum	1,200	2023
(England)	Bradford Bulldogs	1978	Bradford	Bradford Ice Arena	300	2014
(England)	Coventry Blaze NIHL	2007	Coventry	Planet Ice Coventry	3,000	2020
(Wales)	Deeside Dragons 2	2017	Deeside (Queensferry)	Deeside Leisure Centre	1,500	2023
(England)	Kingston Sharks	2023	Hull	Hull Arena	2,000	2023
(England)	Nottingham Lions 2	2021	Nottingham	National Ice Centre	7,500	2021
(England)	Sheffield Scimitars 2	2021	Sheffield	iceSheffield	1,500	2021
(England)	Sutton Sting	2009	Sutton-in-Ashfield	Sutton Leisure Centre	150	2021
(England)	Widnes Wild 2	2026	Widnes	Planet Ice Widnes	600	2026
South
	Club	Founded	Location	Arena	Capacity	Year Entered
(England)	Basingstoke Bison 2	2026	Basingstoke	Planet Ice Basingstoke	2,000	2026
(England)	Bristol Pitbulls 2	2010	Bristol (Patchway)	Planet Ice Bristol	1,300	2021
(Wales)	Cardiff Canucks	2024	Cardiff	Vindico Arena	3,088	2024
(England)	Chelmsford Warriors	2005	Chelmsford	Riverside Ice and Leisure Centre	1,200	2021
(England)	Guildford Phoenix	2017	Guildford	Guildford Spectrum	2,200	2019
(England)	Haringey Huskies	2017	London (Haringey)	Alexandra Palace	1,750	2019
(England)	Invicta Mustangs	1997	Gillingham	Gillingham Ice Bowl	1,000	2019
(England)	Lee Valley Lions	1984	London (Waltham Forest)	Lee Valley Ice Centre	1,000	2019
(England)	Milton Keynes Thunder	2001	Milton Keynes	Marshall Arena	5,000	2012
(England)	Oxford Stars	1984	Oxford	Oxford Ice Rink	1,025	2026
(England)	Peterborough Phantoms 2	2017	Peterborough	Planet Ice Peterborough	1,500	2019
(England)	Slough Spitfires	2025	Slough	Slough Ice Arena	1,000	2025
(England)	Solent Devils 2	2019	Gosport	Planet Ice Gosport	350	2019

== Season structure ==
As of the 2018–19 season, the divisions are the following:

=== North ===
Each team plays each of the other teams in their league a total of four times; twice home, twice away.

At the end of the regular season, the top 4 teams in the division take part in the Playoff weekend, which are one-off games, replacing the previous home/away format. There is not usually a third placed Playoff. Blackburn Hawks currently hold the record of most consecutive final appearances with four from 2011/12 to the present season, winning in 2012/13 and 2014/15.

The rules regarding promotion and relegation between the Moralee and Laidler regularly change.

There are occasional cup competitions, but the format changes in most seasons but usually takes part in a league format.

=== South ===
Each team plays each of the other teams in their league a total of four times; twice home, twice away.

Unlike the North, the South keep a two-legged home-and-away format throughout the playoffs. In Division 1, this is a three-rounded format, involving the teams who finished in the top 8 of the regular season. In Division 2, this is a two-rounded format, involving the teams who finished in the top 2 of their conference. In the semi-finals, the conference winners play the runners-up from the other conference with the final involving the winners of the two semi-finals.

Division 1 has a Cup competition involving six of the teams. These are initially split into two groups of three, with the top two from each group going on to a knock-out, two-legged semi-final and final.

Division 2 has a Cup competition involving eight teams. These are initially split into two groups of four, with each group containing two teams from each conference. The top two teams from each group go onto a single Cup Final Weekend held in a single venue, with semi-finals on the Saturday determining the two teams to play the final on the Sunday.

== League champions ==
=== National League ===
In 2019, the EIHA announced a new National League to sit above the existing regional leagues. This mainly comprised the teams of the former EPIHL that had dropped into NIHL Division 1 in 2017. The competition Champions are as follows:

Season	League champions	Playoff Champions	National Cup Champions	Autumn Cup Champions
2019/20	Telford Tigers	N/A	Telford Tigers	N/A
2020/21	N/A	N/A	N/A	N/A
2021/22	Telford Tigers (2)	Sheffield Steeldogs	Sheffield Steeldogs	Swindon Wildcats
2022/23	Leeds Knights	Leeds Knights	Peterborough Phantoms	N/A
2023/24	Leeds Knights (2)	Peterborough Phantoms	Milton Keynes Lightning	N/A
2024/25	Leeds Knights (3)	Milton Keynes Lightning	Leeds Knights	N/A
2025/26	Swindon Wildcats	Leeds Knights (2)	Sheffield Steeldogs (2)	N/A

=== Division 1 ===
Season	North 1 Champions	South 1 Champions	Playoff Champions	English National Cup Champions
1996/97	Kingston Jets	London Raiders	Wightlink Raiders	N/A
1997/98	Solihull Blaze	Invicta Dynamos	Solihull Blaze	N/A
1998/99	Billingham Stars	Cardiff Devils	Billingham Stars	N/A
1999/00	Billingham Stars (2)	Haringey Greyhounds	Whitley Warriors	N/A
2000/01	Billingham Stars (3)	Basingstoke Buffalo	Whitley Warriors (2)	Whitley Warriors
2001/02	Whitley Warriors	Basingstoke Buffalo (2)	Whitley Warriors (3)	Whitley Warriors (2)
2002/03	Sheffield Scimitars	Basingstoke Buffalo (2)	Basingstoke Buffalo	N/A
2003/04	Flintshire Freeze	Invicta Dynamos (2)	Sheffield Scimitars	Sheffield Scimitars
2004/05	Sheffield Scimitars (2)	Invicta Dynamos (3)	Sheffield Scimitars (2)	Sheffield Scimitars (2)
2005/06	Billingham Stars (4)	Invicta Dynamos (4)	Invicta Dynamos	Invicta Dynamos
2006/07	TDC Northern Stars	Invicta Dynamos (5)	Sheffield Scimitars (3)	Sheffield Scimitars (3)
2007/08	Nottingham Lions	Peterborough Islanders	Whitley Warriors (4)	Sheffield Scimitars (4)
2008/09	Sheffield Scimitars (3)	Invicta Dynamos (6)	Nottingham Lions	Sheffield Scimitars (5)
2009/10	Whitley Warriors (2)	Invicta Dynamos (7)	N/A	N/A
2010/11	Whitley Warriors (3)	Wightlink Raiders	N/A	N/A
2011/12	Billingham Stars (5)	London Raiders (2)	N/A	N/A
2012/13	Solway Sharks	Chelmsford Chieftains	N/A	N/A
2013/14	Solway Sharks (2)	Chelmsford Chieftains(2)	N/A	N/A
2014/15	Blackburn Hawks	Chelmsford Chieftains (3)	N/A	N/A
2015/16	Blackburn Hawks (2)	Chelmsford Chieftains (4)	N/A	N/A
2016/17	Solway Sharks (3)	Chelmsford Chieftains (5)	N/A	N/A
2017/18	Sheffield Steeldogs	Basingstoke Bison	Basingstoke Bison	N/A
2018/19	Hull Pirates	Swindon Wildcats	Hull Pirates	N/A
2019/20	Whitley Warriors (4)	Streatham IHC	N/A	N/A
2020/21	N/A	N/A	N/A	N/A
2021/22	Solway Sharks (4)	Streatham IHC (2)	N/A	N/A
2022/23	Solway Sharks (5)	Streatham IHC (3)	N/A	N/A
2023/24	Billingham Stars (6)	Streatham IHC (4)	N/A	N/A
2024/25	Billingham Stars (7)	Slough Jets	N/A	N/A
2025/26	Blackburn Hawks (3)	Slough Jets (2)		

=== Division 2 ===
Season	North 2 Champions	South 2 Champions
2007/08	N/A	Invicta Dynamos
2008/09	Telford Titans	Chelmsford Chieftains
2009/10	TDC Northern Stars	Bristol Pitbulls
2010/11	Solihull Barons	Slough Jets
2011/12	Solway Sharks	Solent Devils
2012/13	Nottingham Lions	Oxford City Stars
2013/14	Solihull Barons (2)	Oxford City Stars (2)
2014/15	Solihull Barons (3)	Bristol Pitbulls (2)
2015/16	Deeside Dragons	Chelmsford Warriors
2016/17	Blackburn Eagles	Cardiff Fire
2017/18	Altrincham Aces	Oxford City Stars (3)
2018/19	Widnes Wild	Slough Jets (2)
2019/20	Hull Jets	Haringey Huskies
2020/21	N/A	N/A
2021/22	Telford Tigers 2	Guildford Phoenix
2022/23	Hull Jets (2)	Bristol Pitbulls 2
2023/24	Telford Tigers 2 (2)	Swindon Wildcats 2
2024/25	Telford Tigers 2 (3)	Guildford Phoenix (2)
2025/26	Sutton Sting	Guildford Phoenix (3)

== Rules ==
Follows International Ice Hockey Federation (IIHF) rules, as used by countries in all major European leagues. There are significant differences between the National Hockey League rules and IIHF rules, including rink dimension, netminder puck handling, and icing.

The NIHL also operates under additional EIHA regulations.

Additional discipline rules are also enforced by the EIHA, which include;

- Team fines of up to £5,000 for failure to complete a fixture
- Fighting is banned as contrary to the principles of good sportsmanship
- A points system for misconduct and match penalties
- Player suspensions based upon accumulation of points
  - 10 points – 2-game suspension
  - 15 points – 3-game suspension
  - 20 points – 4-game suspension
  - 25 points – 5-game suspension
- Penalty Points for coach/managers and bench officials
- For every 20 penalty points accumulated against the team (players, coaches, managers and bench official) – £25 fine
- 50 team penalty points – £100 fine
- 75 team penalty points – £250 fine plus suspension
- 100 team penalty points – £250 plus the £250 suspended fine awarded at 75 points = £500 total fine

== See also ==
- Category:Seasons in English ice hockey: This category contains links to annual club and league reviews.
