= Telford Tigers 2 =

Ice hockey team from Shropshire, England

- City: Telford, Shropshire
- League: NIHL 1 North
- Founded: 2017
- Home arena: Telford Ice Rink; Capacity: 2300; Ice size: 184 ft x 85 ft 52.673810°N 2.445120°W
- Colours: White, orange, black
- Head coach: Scott McKenzie
- Captain: Mike Jones
- Affiliates: Telford Tigers
- Website: Telford Tigers

Franchise history
- 2017-: Telford Tigers 2

The Telford Tigers 2 are an ice hockey team from Telford, England that compete in the NIHL North 1 Division. They are a minor league affiliate of Telford Tigers, who play in the NIHL National Division.

== Season-by-season record ==
Season	League	GP	W	T	L	OTW	OTL	Pts.	Rank	Postseason
2017–2018	NIHL 2	36	23	-	10	2	1	51	4	Semifinal Loss
2018–2019	NIHL 2	32	22	-	5	1	4	50	2	Semifinal Loss
2019–2020	NIHL 2	26	8	-	16	0	2	16	7	Playoffs Cancelled
