= English Ice Hockey Association =

Governing body of ice hockey, 1982–2026

England
- Association name: English Ice Hockey Association
- IIHF Code: ENG
- IIHF membership: Not an IIHF national member

The old logo of EIH

England Ice Hockey (EIH), formerly the English Ice Hockey Association (EIHA), was the governing body of ice hockey in England and Wales. It was formed in 1982 and featured around 60 teams. EIHA was one of several bodies regulating ice hockey in the United Kingdom, along with Scottish Ice Hockey (SIH), the Northern Ireland Ice Hockey Association (IHNI), and Ice Hockey UK, which governs the national ice hockey teams of Great Britain as a national member of the International Ice Hockey Association (IIHF). In 2016, support for uniting the associations under one central organization has been expressed by heads of each of the various organizations, but, as of 2020, there are no actionable plans to be executed in the near future.

On 30 June 2026, England Ice Hockey merged with Scottish Ice Hockey and Ice Hockey UK, to become the "First Olympic sport in Britain to fully unify governing bodies".

== Responsibilities ==
The leagues and areas for which EIH were responsible were:

- National Ice Hockey League (NIHL)
- Women's National Ice Hockey League (WNIHL)
- National Team Programme (NTP), a training and development programme for junior players, also called "Team England"
- British Universities Ice Hockey Association
- Recreational ice hockey

EIHA was also responsible for conducting courses on coaching as well as managing the training and registration of on-ice and off-ice officials.
