= Swindon Wildcats 2 =

Ice hockey team from Wiltshire, England

- City: Swindon, Wiltshire (England)
- League: NIHL 2 South West Division
- Founded: 2006
- Home arena: Link Centre
- Colors: Red & White, Red & Black
- Head coach: (England) Lee Richardson
- Captain: (England) William Harding
- Media: Cats TV
- Affiliate: Swindon Wildcats

Franchise history
- 1986–2017: Swindon Wildcats NIHL
- 2017-: Swindon Wildcats 2

The Swindon Wildcats 2 are an amateur English ice hockey team based in Swindon, Wiltshire. The team is a development team for the Swindon Wildcats. The team currently plays in the NIHL 2 South West.

Founded in 2006, the team aims to nurture young talent and create a pathway for players to advance to the higher levels of competitive ice hockey within the UK.

== Club roster 2020–21 ==
Netminders
No.	Nat.	Player	Catches	Date of birth	Place of birth	Acquired	Contract

Defencemen
No.	Nat.	Player	Shoots	Date of birth	Place of birth	Acquired	Contract

Forwards
No.	Nat.	Player	Shoots	Date of birth	Place of birth	Acquired	Contract
37	(England)	Jack Goodchild	R	14 October 2002 (age 23)	England	2018 from Okanagan Hockey Academy UK U18	20/21
40	(England)	Jake Williams	R	18 August 2001 (age 24)	England	2017 from Swindon Cougars	Two Way

== 2020/21 Outgoing ==
Outgoing
No.	Nat.	Player	Shoots	Date of birth	Place of birth	Leaving for
16	(England)	Jay Warren		9 March 2001 (age 24)	England	Oxford City Stars
