= Cardiff Fire =

Ice hockey team in Wales

- City: Cardiff, Wales
- League: NIHL Wilkinson South 1 Division
- Founded: 2015
- Home arena: Ice Arena Wales
- Colors: Black & Red
- Head coach: Elis Sheppard
- Captain: Lewis Stevens
- Affiliate: Cardiff Devils
- Website: Cardiff Fire

The Cardiff Fire (Welsh: Tân Caerdydd) are an ice hockey team based in Cardiff, Wales. They currently play in the NIHL South Division 1. The Cardiff Fire are a minor league affiliate of the Cardiff Devils of the Elite Ice Hockey League.

== Season-by-season record ==
Season	League	GP	W	T	L	OTW	OTL	Pts.	Rank	Post Season
2015–2016	NIHL 2	14	9	4	1	-	-	23	1st	Final Loss
2016–2017	NIHL 2	14	14	0	0	-	-	32	1st	Semi-Final Loss
2017–2018	NIHL 1	32	0	-	29	0	2	3	9th	Did not make playoffs
2018-2019	NIHL 2	27	12	-	13	1	0	29	8th	Did not make playoffs
2019-2020	NIHL 1	36	6	-	28	2	1	12	9th	Playoffs Cancelled
2021-2022	NIHL 2	27	0	-	0	0	0	0	*th	Semi-Final loss

== Club roster 2024–25 ==
Netminders
No.	Nat.	Player	Catches	Date of birth	Place of birth	Acquired	Contract

Defencemen
No.	Nat.	Player	Shoots	Date of birth	Place of birth	Acquired	Contract

Forwards
No.	Nat.	Player	Shoots	Date of birth	Place of birth	Acquired	Contract

== 2021/22 Outgoing ==
Outgoing
No.	Nat.	Player	Shoots	Date of birth	Place of birth	Leaving For
55	(Lithuania) (Russia)	Ruslan Cernych	R	17 May 1995 (age 30)	Moscow, Russia	(France) Valenciennes
