= Hull Jets =

- City: Kingston upon Hull, England
- League: NIHL North Division 1
- Founded: 2013
- Home arena: Hull Arena
- Colors: White, silver, dark blue
- General manager: Barrie Archer
- Head coach: Andy Daintith
- Affiliates: Hull Seahawks
- Website: Hull Jets

The Hull Jets are an ice hockey team playing in the NIHL 1 (North) as an affiliate of the National League Hull Seahawks. Based in Kingston upon Hull, England, the Jets play their home games at Hull Arena.

== Season-by-season record ==
Season	League	GP	W	T	L	OTW	OTL	GF	GA	Pts.	Rank	Postseason
2013-2014	NIHL 2	28	10	2	16	-	-	98	158	22	6	Did not make playoffs
2014-2015	NIHL 2	36	13	3	20	-	-	112	148	29	7	No playoffs held
2015-2016	NIHL 2	28	8	2	18	-	-	100	140	18	6	Did not make playoffs
2016-2017	NIHL 2	28	9	3	16	-	-	105	145	21	6	Did not make playoffs
2017-2018	NIHL 2	36	21	-	10	5	0	243	129	52	3	Semifinal loss
2018-2019	NIHL 2	32	16	-	8	5	3	156	98	45	3	Final loss
2019-2020	NIHL 2	25	17	-	5	2	1	176	70	40	1	League Winners

== Club roster 2020–21 ==
Netminders
No.	Nat.	Player	Catches	Date of birth	Place of birth	Acquired	Contract

Defencemen
No.	Nat.	Player	Shoots	Date of birth	Place of birth	Acquired	Contract

Forwards
No.	Nat.	Player	Shoots	Date of birth	Place of birth	Acquired	Contract

== 2020/21 outgoing ==
Outgoing
No.	Nat.	Player	Shoots	Date of birth	Place of birth	Leaving For
