= Hull Seahawks =

Ice hockey team based in Kingston upon Hull, England

- City: Kingston upon Hull, England
- League: NIHL
- Division: National League
- Founded: 2022
- Home arena: Hull Arena
- Colours: Black, White and Grey
- Owner: IMJ Group
- Head coach: Matty Davies (England)
- Captain: Bobby Chamberlain (England)
- Affiliates: Manchester Storm (EIHL); Hull Jets (NIHL 1)
- Website: Hull Seahawks

Franchise history
- 1988–1993: Humberside Seahawks
- 1993–1996: Humberside Hawks
- 1996–1999: Kingston Hawks
- 1999–2003: Hull Thunder
- 2003–2015: Hull Stingrays
- 2015–2020: Hull Pirates
- 2022 – Present: Hull Seahawks

The Hull Seahawks are an ice hockey team based in Kingston upon Hull and their home ice is the Hull Arena. They compete in the NIHL National Division.

== Formation ==
The Hull Pirates were formed when the Hull Stingrays went into liquidation in June 2015. The Stingrays' place in the Elite Ice Hockey League was taken by Manchester Storm.

On Friday 3 July 2015, Shane Smith, a 43-year-old Rotherham-based businessman, held a press day at the Hull Arena to announce the formation of the Hull Pirates and that they had been accepted into the EPIHL.

It was also announced that former Hull Stingrays' forward Dominic Osman would become a player-coach and part-owner of Hull Pirates.

A fans' forum was held on 15 July 2015 with the unveiling of the club's logo. The Pirates had six weeks to put together a team in time for the upcoming league campaign.

In their first season as a club, Hull Pirates achieved a 9th-place finish in the EPIHL.

For the 2016–17 season, the Pirates announced the re-signings of forwards Nathan Salem and Lee Bonner as well as Jamie Chilcott and Jonathan Kirk, who both play in defence. Goalie Ashley Smith became the club's latest signing on 20 March 2016.

Following the culmination of the 2016–17 season and the collapse of the EPIHL, the Hull Pirates were left with no choice and announced their intention to join the National Ice Hockey League.

The team did not play in the 2021–22 season as their rink was not available in time for the start of the season.

Ahead of the 2022–23 season, it was announced that due diligence of a new ownership group (IMJ Group) had been completed and the Hull Seahawks would be competing in the NIHL National Division in place of the Pirates. IMJ consists of Ian Mowfirth, Joe Lamplough and former Pirates, Stingrays and Kingston forward Matty Davies. Davies will also take up the roles of General Manager and Player-Coach.

== Season-by-season record ==
Hull Pirates season-by-season record

Season	League	GP	W	L	OTL	PTS	League Position	Post-Season	Head coach
2015–16	English Premier Ice Hockey League	54	11	38	5	27	9th out of 10	-.-	Dominic Osman (United States)
2016-17	English Premier Ice Hockey League	48	20	26	2	42	7th out of 10	Finished last place in Quarter-Final Playoffs - Group B (0–3 record)	Dominic Osman (United States) & Jason Hewitt (England)
2017–18	NIHL Division 1 (North)	36	29	5	2	60	2nd out of 10	Division 1 North Conference Semi-Finals	Jason Hewitt (England)
2018–19	NIHL Division 1 (North)	36	32	2	2	66	1st out of 10	Division 1 National Playoff Champions	Jason Hewitt (England)
2019–20	NIHL National Division	49	27	19	3	57	5th out of 10	Postseason cancelled due to COVID pandemic	Jason Hewitt (England)

Hull Seahawks season-by-season record

Season	League	GP	W	L	OTL	PTS	League Position	Post-Season	Head coach
2022–23	NIHL National Division	56	14	40	2	30	11th out of 11	-.-	Matthew Davies (England)
2023–24	NIHL National Division	54	31	20	3	65	4th out of 11	Playoff Group Stage (3rd out of 4th)	Matthew Davies (England)
2024–25	NIHL National Division	54	30	18	6	66	4th out of 11	Playoff Group Stage (3rd out of 4th)	Matthew Davies (England)
2025–26	NIHL National Division	54	35	18	1	71	2nd out of 11	Runners-up (Lost in Final)	Matthew Davies (England)
2026–27	NIHL National Division	18	15	3	0	30	2nd out of 11 (currently)	TBC/Pending	Matthew Davies (England)

Note: GP = Games played; W = Wins; L = Losses; OTL = Overtime losses; PTS = Points;

== Coaching records ==
Name	Duration	Regular season			
Name	Duration	GC	W	L	OTL
Hull Pirates (EPIHL)
Dominic Osman	2015–2017	89	27	56	6
Jason Hewitt	2017	13	4	8	1
Hull Pirates (NIHL - Division 1 North)
Jason Hewitt	2017–2019	72	61	7	4
Hull Pirates (NIHL - National Division)
Jason Hewitt	2019–2020	49	27	19	3
Hull Seahawks (NIHL - National Division)
Matty Davies	2022–Present	218	110	96	12

- Note: Head coaching records are for regular season results only and does not include cup competitions, playoffs or exhibition games*

JASON HEWITT COMBINED RECORD: 92-34-8
