= IceSheffield =

Ice arena in England

Coordinates: 53°23′58″N 1°25′26″W

iceSheffield
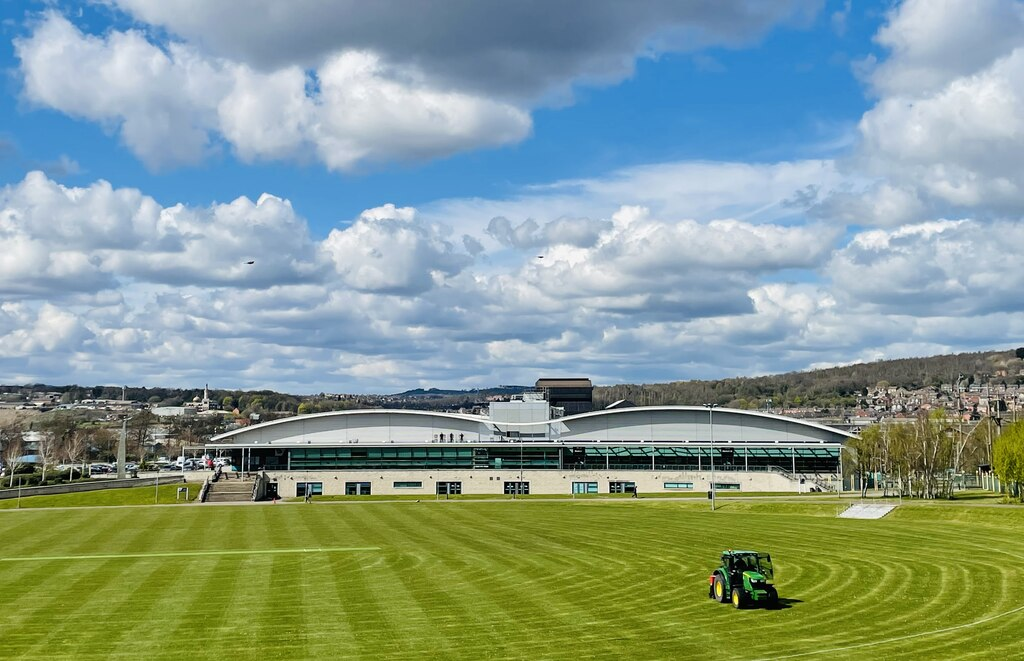
- A view of iceSheffield
- Interactive map of iceSheffield
- Location: iceSheffield, Coleridge Road, Sheffield, S9 5DA
- Owner: Sheffield City Council
- Operator: Everyone Active (Sports and Leisure Management Ltd)
- Capacity: Bauer Arena – 1,500 (seated) Pad 2 – 125 (seated)
- Public transit: Y TT; Arena / Olympic Legacy Park

Construction
- Opened: 2003
- Cost: £15,000,000
- Architect: Building Design Partnership

iceSheffield is an ice arena in the Lower Don Valley, Sheffield, England. It was completed in May 2003 at a cost of £15 million. It is one of only three facilities in the UK that has two Olympic sized ice pads, with seating for 1,500 people in pad 1 and 125 in pad 2. The venue focuses on an inclusive approach, with activities open to all levels from community use to elite performance. It is home to all ice hockey teams in Sheffield except the Sheffield Steelers, who are still based at nearby Sheffield Arena, though the venue has hosted a number of Steelers games in recent seasons.

Managed by Everyone Active on behalf of the Sheffield City Council, in February 2015 it was announced that iceSheffield would be incorporated into the Olympic Legacy Park on the site of the former Don Valley Stadium.

== Events ==
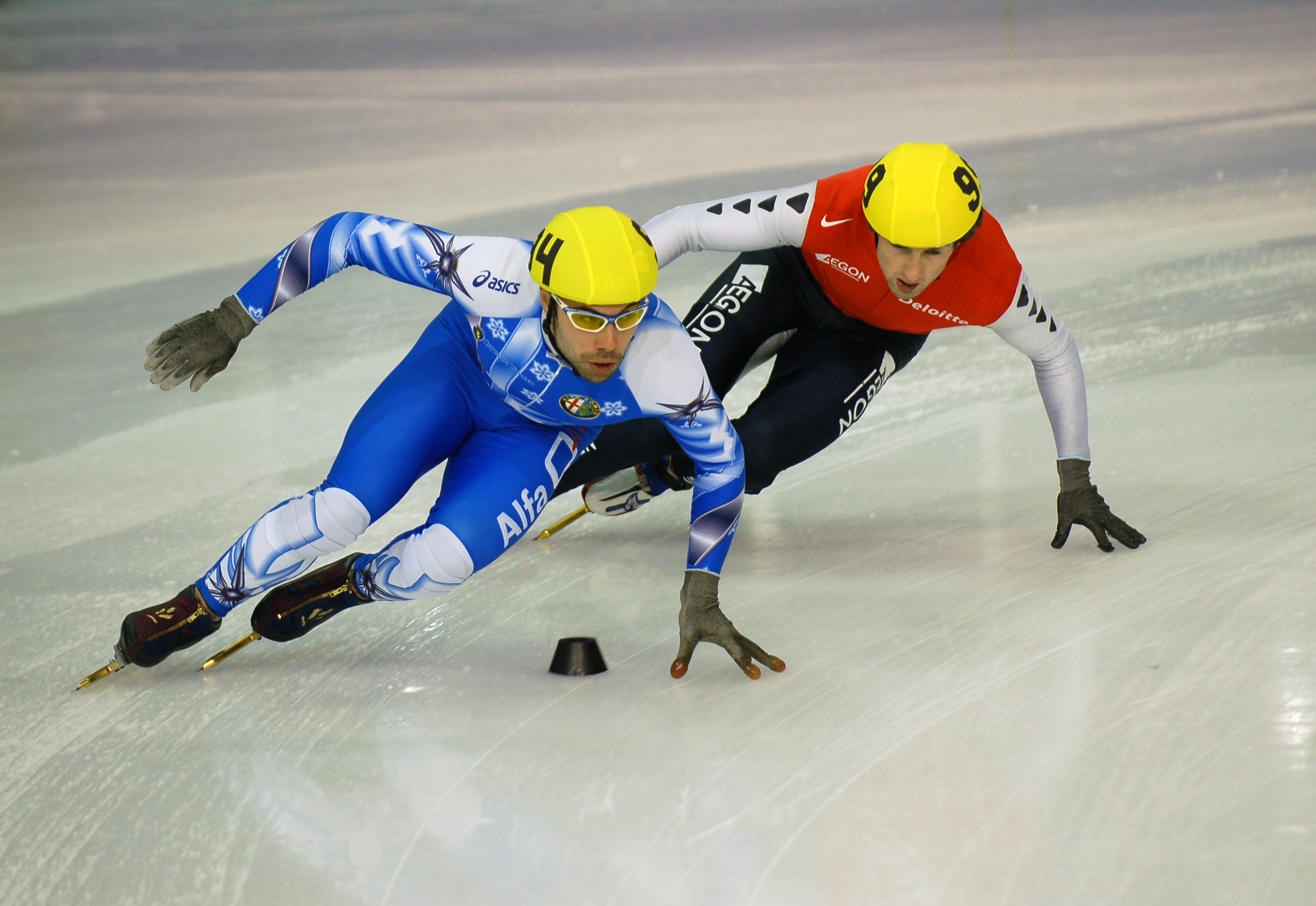
Speed skating at IceSheffield

The venue hosts a range of events, including disco sessions for young people.

The main sports team to play at iceSheffield is the Sheffield Bears ice hockey team, who play in the British Universities Ice Hockey Association. The Sheffield Steelers also use it as a second home and a training ground.
