= Fred Perlini =

Canadian ice hockey player

- Born: April 12, 1962 (age 64) Sault Ste. Marie, Ontario, Canada
- Height: 6 ft 2 in (188 cm)
- Weight: 175 lb (79 kg; 12 st 7 lb)
- Position: Centre
- Shot: Left
- Played for: Toronto Maple Leafs; Nottingham Panthers; Fife Flyers; Guildford Flames
- NHL draft: 158th overall, 1980; Toronto Maple Leafs
- Playing career: 1981–1996

Fred Perlini (born April 12, 1962) is a Canadian former professional ice hockey centre. He was selected by the Toronto Maple Leafs of the National Hockey League (NHL) in the eighth round (158th overall) of the 1980 NHL entry draft, for whom he eventually played eight games between 1981 and 1984. The rest of his career, which lasted from 1981 to 1996, was spent in the United Kingdom's lower levels.

== Playing career ==
Perlini played minor ice hockey for his hometown Sault Ste. Marie Legion of the OMHA. He played in the 1975 Quebec International Pee-Wee Hockey Tournament with Sault Ste. Marie. In 1978, he scored 107 points in just 27 games for his minor team.

He later played junior ice hockey in the Ontario Hockey League (OHL) to play for the Toronto Marlboros where he played for three years, accumulating more than 200 points in just 170 games. In 1981 Perlini scored a hat-trick for the Toronto Marlboros one afternoon, and also played and scored for the Toronto Maple Leafs on the same day.

Perlini only made eight appearances in the NHL, all with the Maple Leafs, scoring two goals and adding three assists. He took part in six Maple Leafs training camps as well as one with the Pittsburgh Penguins and one with the New York Rangers.

Perlini played for four years in the American Hockey League (AHL) for the St. Catharines Saints and Baltimore Skipjacks, where he notched up an impressive 140 points.

In 1986 Perlini moved to the United Kingdom to play for the Nottingham Panthers of the British Hockey League (BHL), where he spent just one season scoring an incredible 171 points in just 35 games. He continued in this rich goal-scoring form with two more consecutive 170 point seasons for the Fife Flyers and Deeside Dragons scoring 103 goals in each of those seasons. He went on to play seven more seasons in the British leagues for Trafford Metros, Blackburn Hawks, Streatham Redskins, Basingstoke Beavers, Lee Valley Lions and finally playing three seasons for the Guildford Flames. Perlini scored more than 1400 points in British league games.

During the 2000–01 season, his jersey number 11 shirt retired by the Guildford Flames for outstanding contributions to Guildford ice hockey while playing as well as contributions off the ice to the community and junior programs.

== Post-playing career ==
After finishing his career in Guildford in 1996, Perlini was appointed as Head of Junior Hockey, where he remained until September 2007 when he and his family returned home to Canada.

In that time he coached the Guildford U10s, U12s, U14s, U16s, and U19s to Southern Division Titles on various occasions.

== Family ==
His oldest son, Brett, has played professional hockey with Fred's old club, the Nottingham Panthers of the EIHL. Younger son Brendan is also a professional hockey player, and was drafted in the first round (12th overall) of the 2014 NHL draft by the Arizona Coyotes.

== Career statistics ==
=== Regular season and playoffs ===
			Regular season					Playoffs
Season	Team	League	GP	G	A	Pts	PIM	GP	G	A	Pts	PIM
1978–79	Sault Ste. Marie Legion	NOHA	27	57	50	107	—	—	—	—	—	—
1979–80	Toronto Marlboros	OMJHL	67	13	18	31	12	4	0	1	1	5
1980–81	Toronto Marlboros	OHL	55	37	29	66	48	5	0	0	0	4
1981–82	Toronto Maple Leafs	NHL	7	2	3	5	0	—	—	—	—	—
1981–82	Toronto Marlboros	OHL	68	47	64	111	75	10	4	9	13	8
1982–83	St. Catharines Saints	AHL	76	8	22	30	24	—	—	—	—	—
1983–84	Toronto Maple Leafs	NHL	1	0	0	0	0	—	—	—	—	—
1983–84	St. Catharines Saints	AHL	79	21	31	52	67	7	1	1	2	17
1984–85	St. Catharines Saints	AHL	77	21	28	49	26	—	—	—	—	—
1985–86	Baltimore Skipjacks	AHL	25	6	4	10	6	—	—	—	—	—
1986–87	Nottingham Panthers	BHL	35	89	82	171	135	4	6	8	14	8
1987–88	Fife Flyers	BHL	35	103	73	176	34	6	20	14	34	0
1988–89	Deeside Dragons	BD1	24	103	69	172	42	—	—	—	—	—
1989–90	Trafford Metros	BD1	25	81	59	140	14	—	—	—	—	—
1990–91	Telford Tigers	BD1	5	9	8	17	2	—	—	—	—	—
1990–91	Blackburn Blackhawks	BD2	21	83	49	132	48	—	—	—	—	—
1991–92	Streatham Redskins	BD2	23	93	53	146	42	—	—	—	—	—
1992–93	Streatham Redskins	BD2	31	135	91	226	20	—	—	—	—	—
1993–94	Basingstoke Beavers	BHL	1	0	0	0	0	—	—	—	—	—
1993–94	Lee Valley Lions	BD1	20	71	47	118	26	—	—	—	—	—
1994–95	Guildford Flames	BD1	44	78	57	135	40	—	—	—	—	—
1995–96	Guildford Flames	BD1	50	90	56	146	51	—	—	—	—	—
1996–97	Guildford Flames	EPIHL	27	32	18	50	14	10	6	6	12	0
BD1 totals			168	432	296	728	175	6	3	8	11	0
NHL totals			8	2	3	5	0	—	—	—	—	—
