= Durdle (disambiguation) =

Durdle primarily refers to Durdle Door, a natural limestone arch in Dorset, England.

Durdle may also refer to:

- Durdle Pier, disused 17th-century stone shipping quay in Dorset, England
- Darren Durdle (born 1963), Canadian ice hockey defencemen
- Doug Durdle, birth name of Doug Williams (wrestler) (born 1972), English professional wrestler

== See also ==
- Durdles, a character in Charles Dickens' The Mystery of Edwin Drood
