= Ice hockey arena =

Sport venue in which an ice hockey competition is held

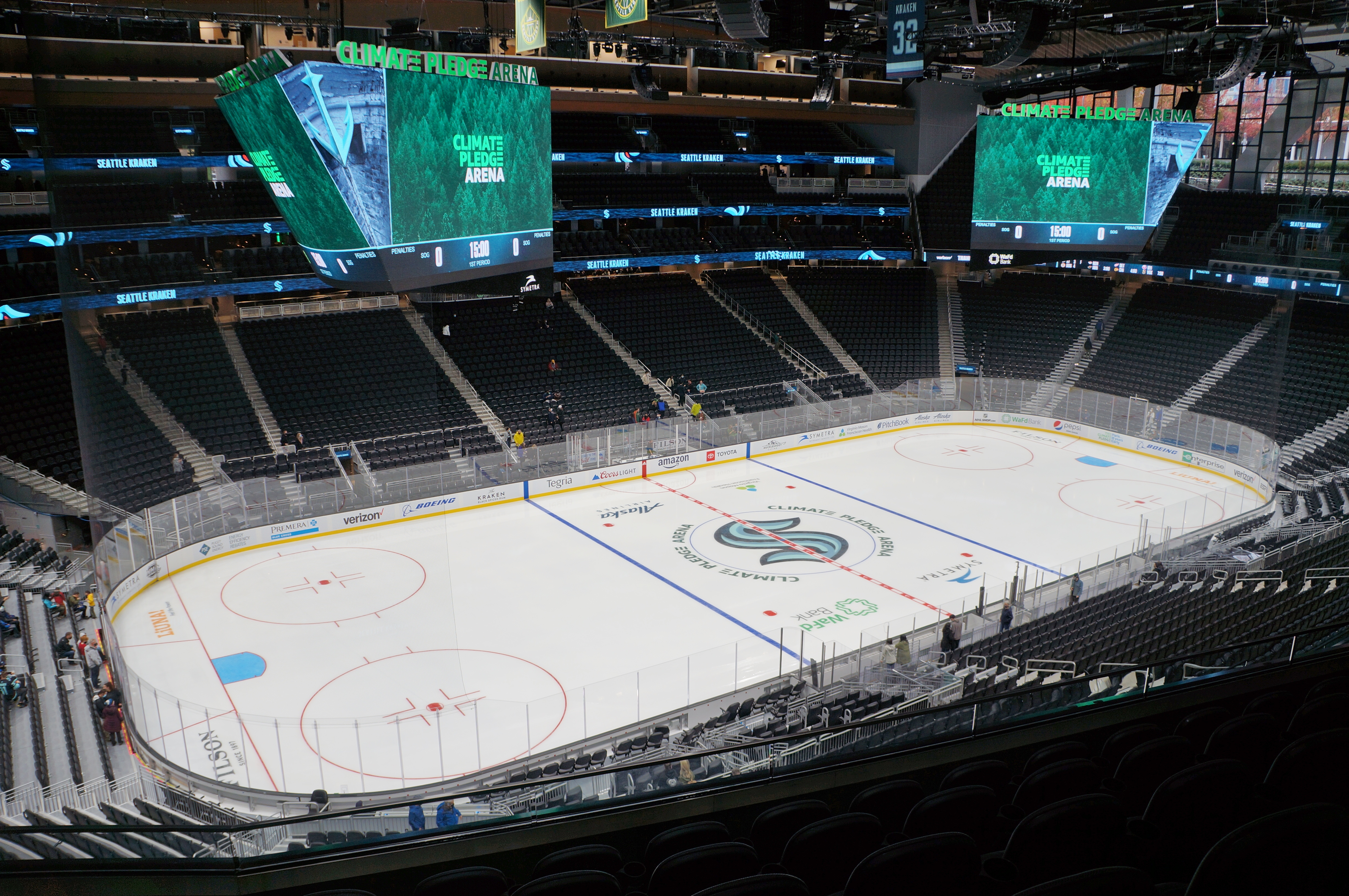
Climate Pledge Arena in Seattle, home of the Seattle Kraken, pictured in October 2021

An ice hockey arena (or ice hockey venue, or ice hockey stadium) is a sport venue in which an ice hockey competition is held. Alternatively it is used for other sports such as broomball, ringette and rink bandy.

== Multi-purpose arenas ==
A number of ice hockey arenas were also designed for use by multiple types of sport, such as basketball. In many of these multi-purpose arenas, such as the United Center in Chicago and Crypto.com Arena in Los Angeles, an insulated plywood floor is placed, piece-by-piece, on top of the ice surface, and then the basketball court boards are placed over that.

== Notable examples ==
This list is incomplete. See the link above for a more complete list.

Arena names with an asterisk (*) after their city name means that it has either been demolished or is no longer used by any ice hockey teams.

=== Canada ===
- The Montreal Forum in Montreal* was the home of 24 Stanley Cup Champions
- The Bell Centre in Montreal is the largest hockey arena of the National Hockey League.
- Scotiabank Saddledome in Calgary was expandable to IIHF rink dimensions
- Rogers Arena in Vancouver hosted the 2010 Winter Olympics Men's Hockey Gold Medal match (originally General Motors Place)
- Maple Leaf Gardens in Toronto is now partially occupied by Toronto Metropolitan University and the TMU Bold ice hockey, basketball, and volleyball teams, with the remainder housing a Loblaws supermarket
- Scotiabank Arena in Toronto (formerly known as Air Canada Centre)
- Rogers Place in Edmonton
- Canadian Tire Centre in Ottawa (originally The Palladium; later known as Corel Centre and Scotiabank Place)
- Canada Life Centre in Winnipeg
- Videotron Centre in Quebec City

=== United States ===
- Madison Square Garden in New York City is "The World's Most Famous Arena"
- Chicago Stadium in Chicago* was "The Madhouse on Madison"
- United Center in Chicago, replacement for Chicago Stadium, and the second largest arena by capacity in the National Hockey League
- Crypto.com Arena in Los Angeles
- PPG Paints Arena in Pittsburgh
- Matthews Arena, in Boston, the world's oldest indoor ice hockey venue still in use (opened 1910), hosts the Northeastern Huskies collegiate hockey teams
- Boston Garden in Boston* (1928–1995) had an undersized rink because it was built when the NHL had no regulation rink specifications
- Appleton Arena in Canton, New York has been home of the St. Lawrence University Skating Saints since opening in 1950
- TD Garden in Boston, capacity of 17,565 for Bruins games
- Xcel Energy Center in Saint Paul
- Ball Arena in Denver
- American Airlines Center in Dallas
- Amerant Bank Arena in the Miami suburb of Sunrise, Florida
- Bridgestone Arena in Nashville
- Honda Center in Anaheim
- KeyBank Center in Buffalo
- Desert Diamond Arena in the Phoenix suburb of Glendale, Arizona
- Nassau Veterans Memorial Coliseum in Uniondale
- Nationwide Arena in Columbus
- Prudential Center in Newark, known as "The Rock"
- SAP Center at San Jose in San Jose
- Enterprise Center in St. Louis
- Benchmark International Arena in Tampa
- Capital One Arena in Washington
- Xfinity Mobile Arena in Philadelphia
- T-Mobile Arena on the Las Vegas Strip
- Little Caesars Arena in Detroit
- Lenovo Center in Raleigh
- Ingalls Rink at Yale University in New Haven, Connecticut
- Climate Pledge Arena in Seattle

=== Finland ===
- Helsinki Halli in Helsinki
- Nokia Arena in Tampere
- Veikkaus Arena In Helsinki

=== Germany ===
- Lanxess Arena in Cologne

=== Czech Republic ===
- O2 Arena in Prague

=== Russia ===
- Megasport Arena in Moscow

=== Sweden ===
- Avicii Arena in Stockholm
- Scandinavium in Gothenburg

=== Switzerland ===
- PostFinance Arena in Bern

=== Italy ===
- The Stadio olimpico del ghiaccio in Cortina d'Ampezzo was the main venue of the 1956 Winter Olympics.
- The Palasport Olimpico in Turin was the main venue of the 2006 Winter Olympics.
- Santagiulia Ice Hockey Arena was the main venue for ice hockey at the 2026 Winter Olympics.

=== United Kingdom ===
- Odyssey Arena in Belfast
- Braehead Arena in Glasgow
- National Ice Centre in Nottingham
- iceSheffield in Sheffield
- Sheffield Arena in Sheffield
- Fife Ice Arena in Kirkcaldy
- Coventry Skydome in Coventry
- Dundee Ice Arena in Dundee
- Murrayfield Ice Rink in Edinburgh
- AO Arena in Manchester
- Blackburn Arena in Blackburn
- Ice Arena Wales in Cardiff
- Guildford Spectrum in Guildford

== Gallery ==
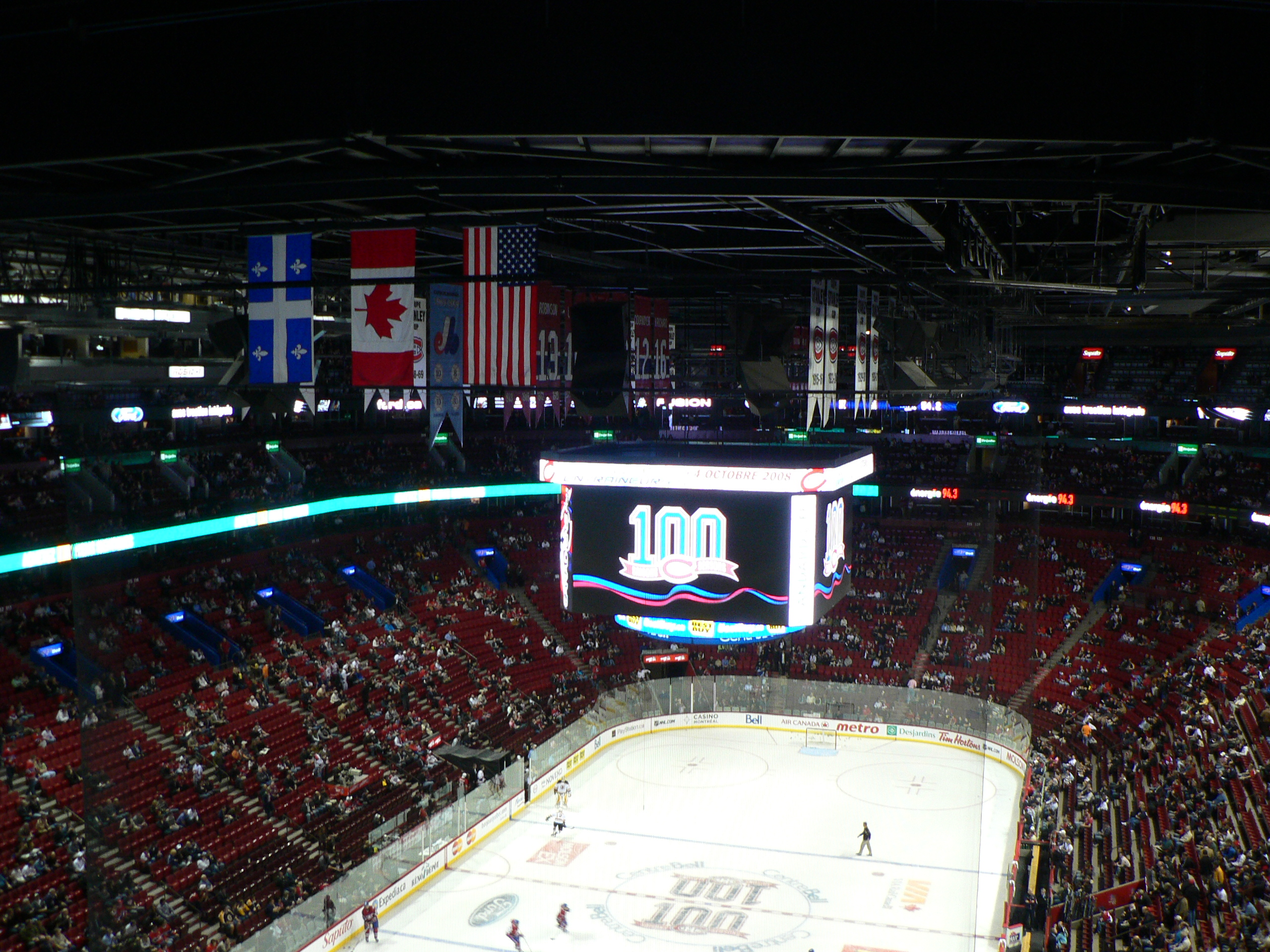
Centre Bell in Montreal

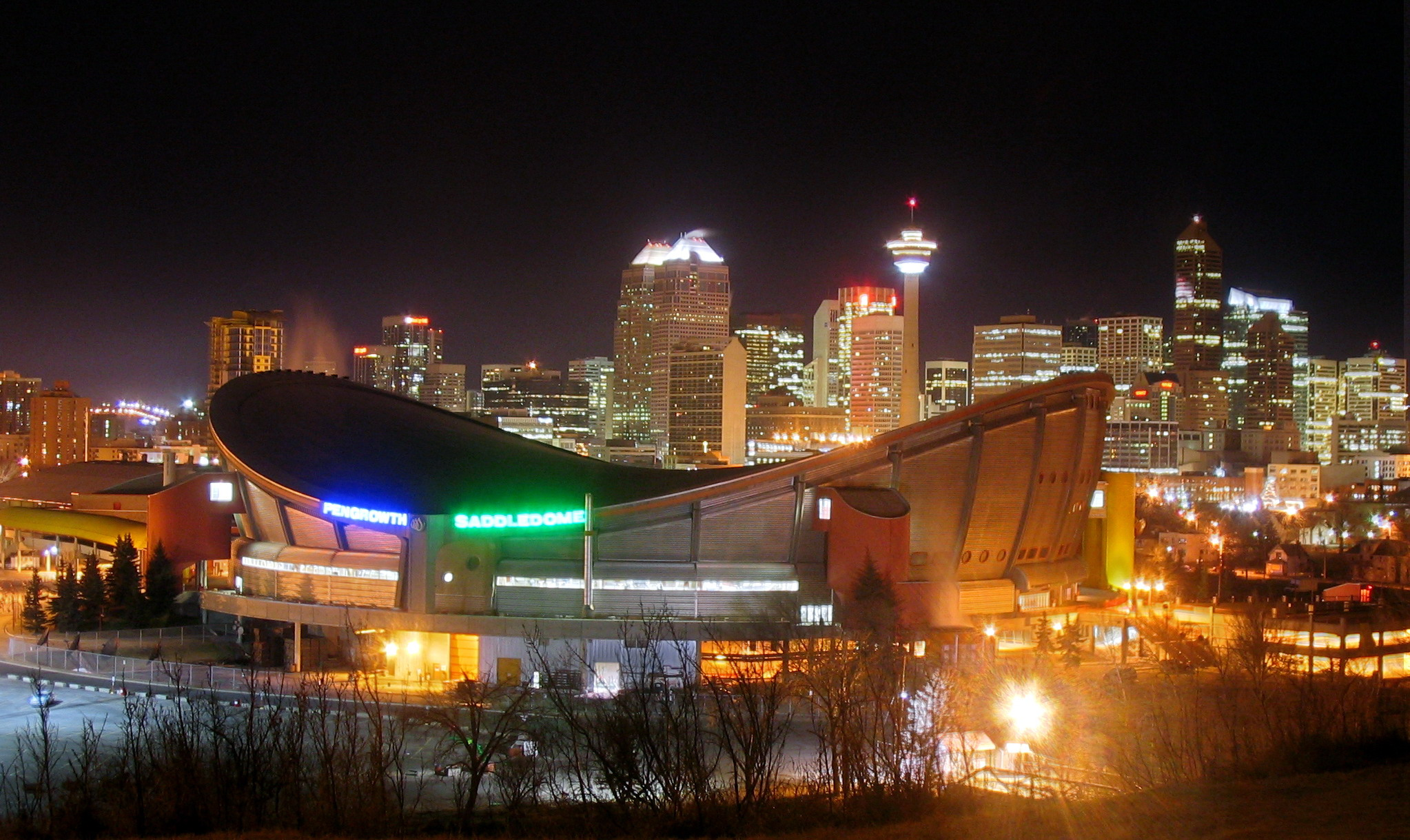
Night view of Scotiabank Saddledome in Calgary

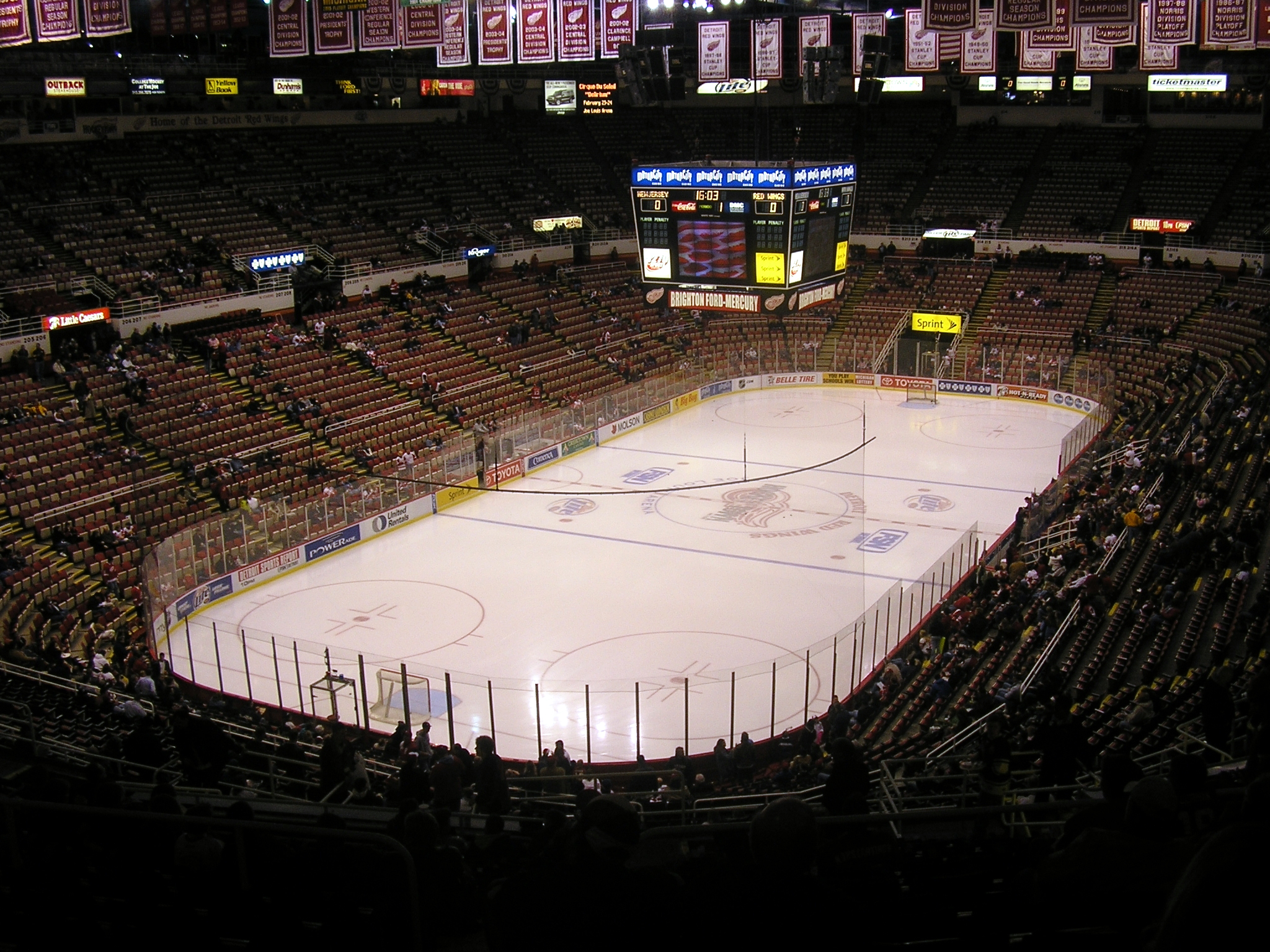
Joe Louis Arena in Detroit

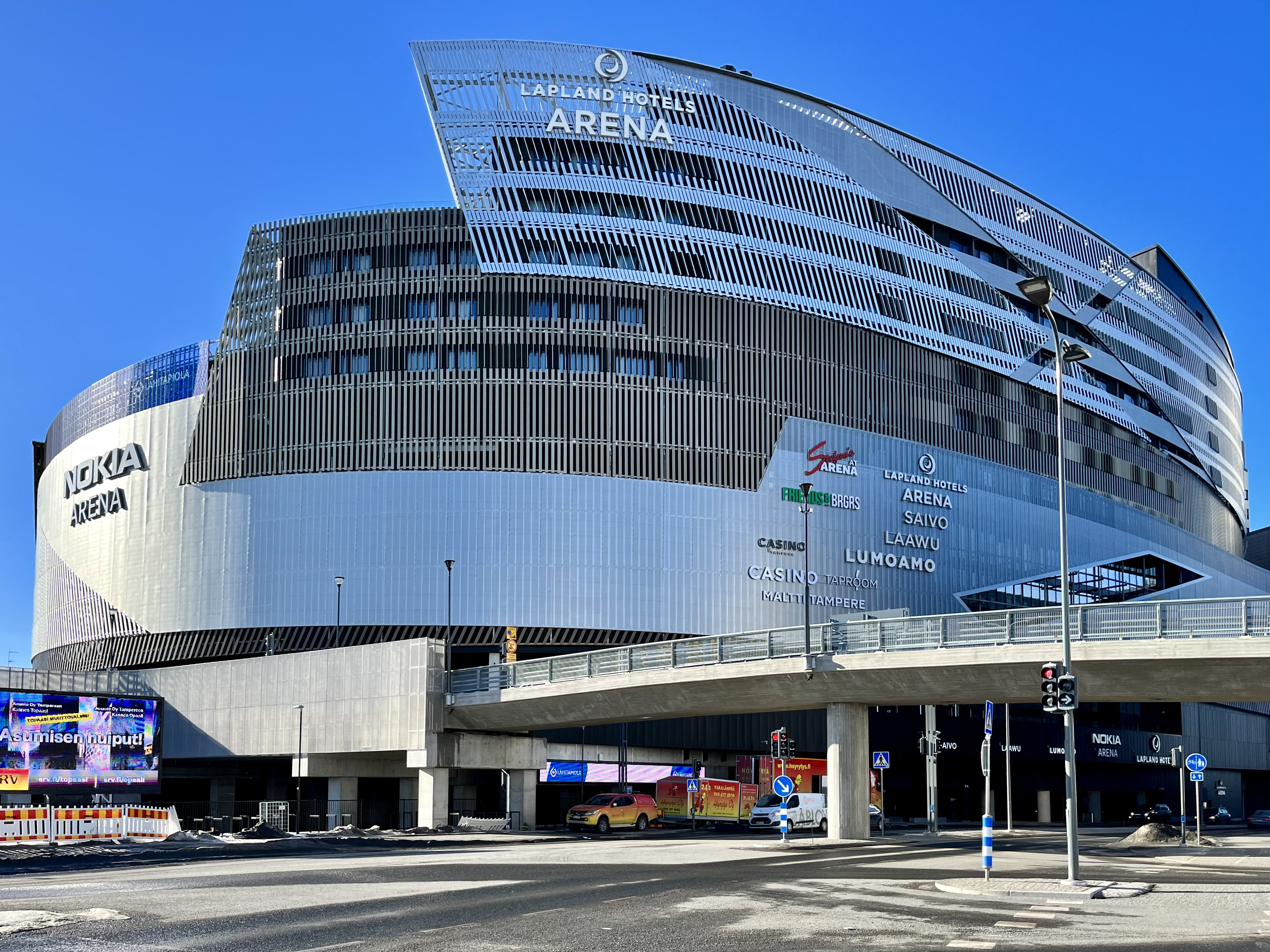
Nokia Arena in Tampere

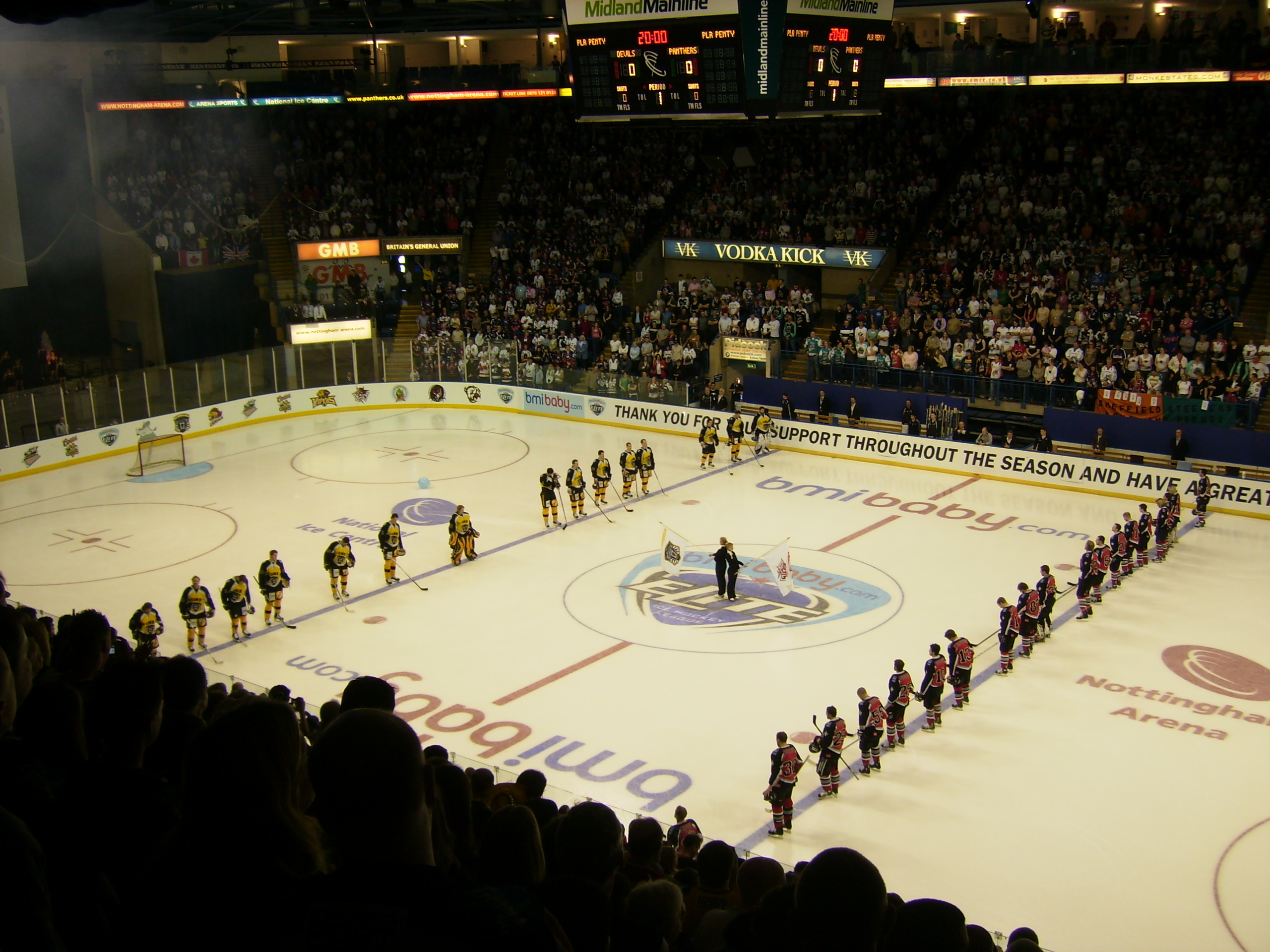
National Ice Centre in Nottingham

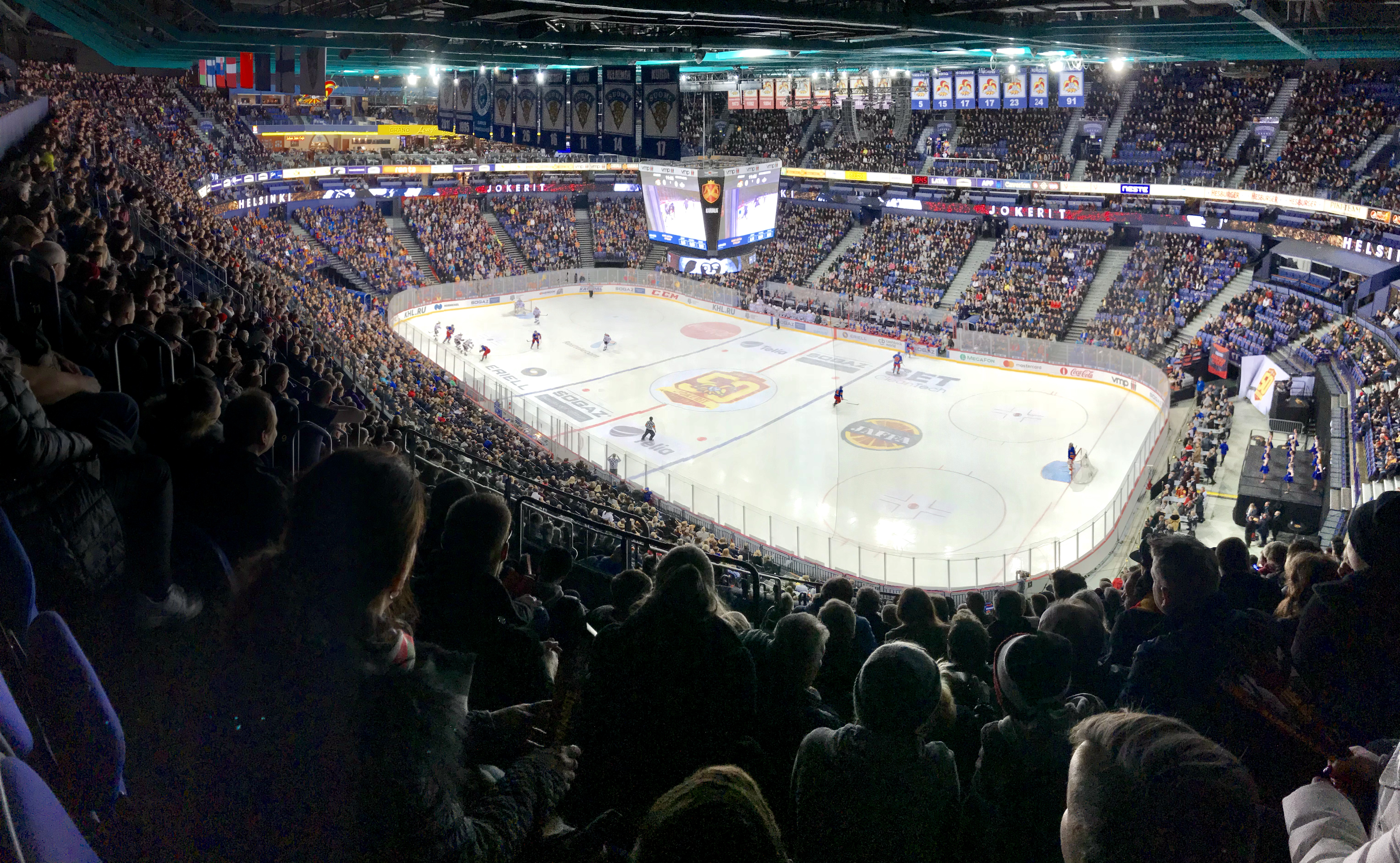
Helsinki Halli in Helsinki

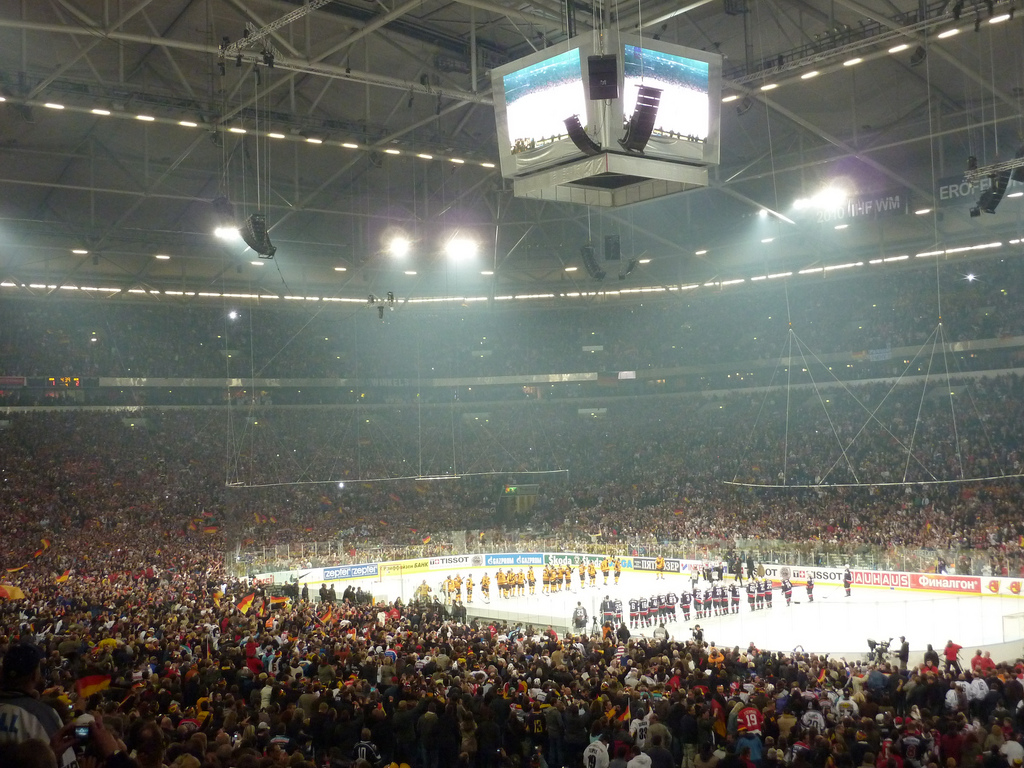
Veltins-Arena during the opening game of the 2010 IIHF World Championship, which was attended by 77,803 people.

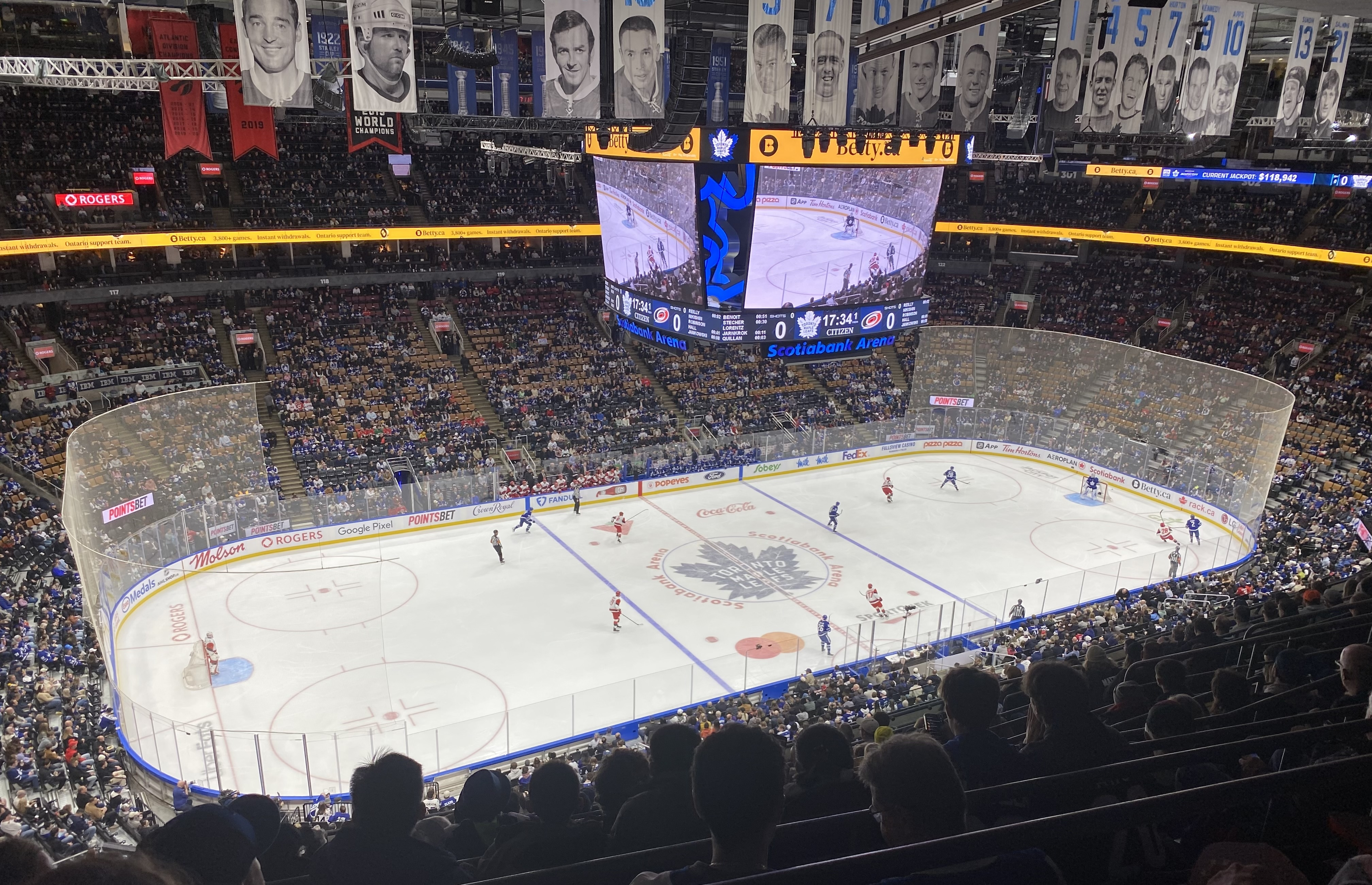
Scotiabank Arena in Toronto in 2026

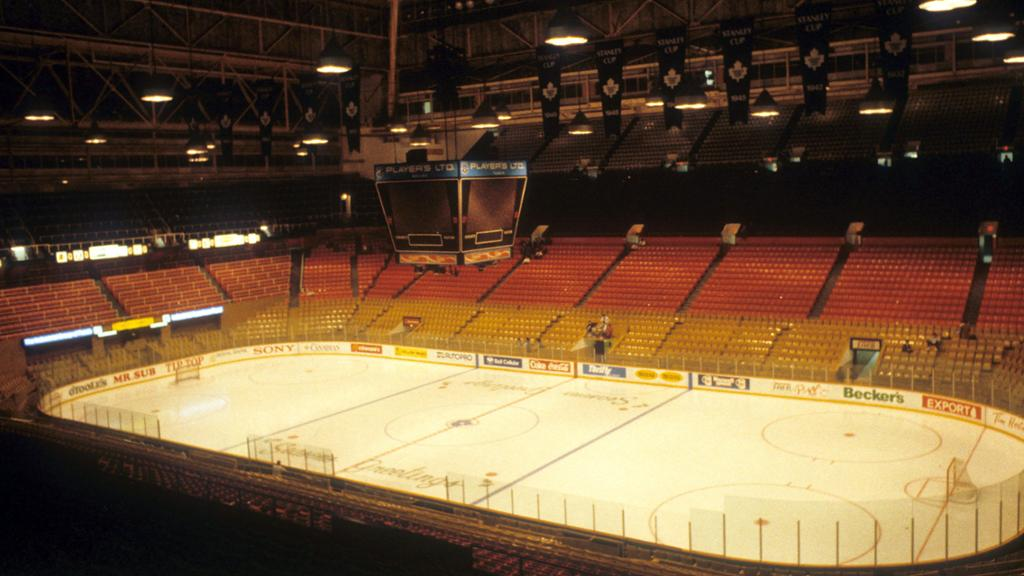
Maple Leaf Gardens in Toronto

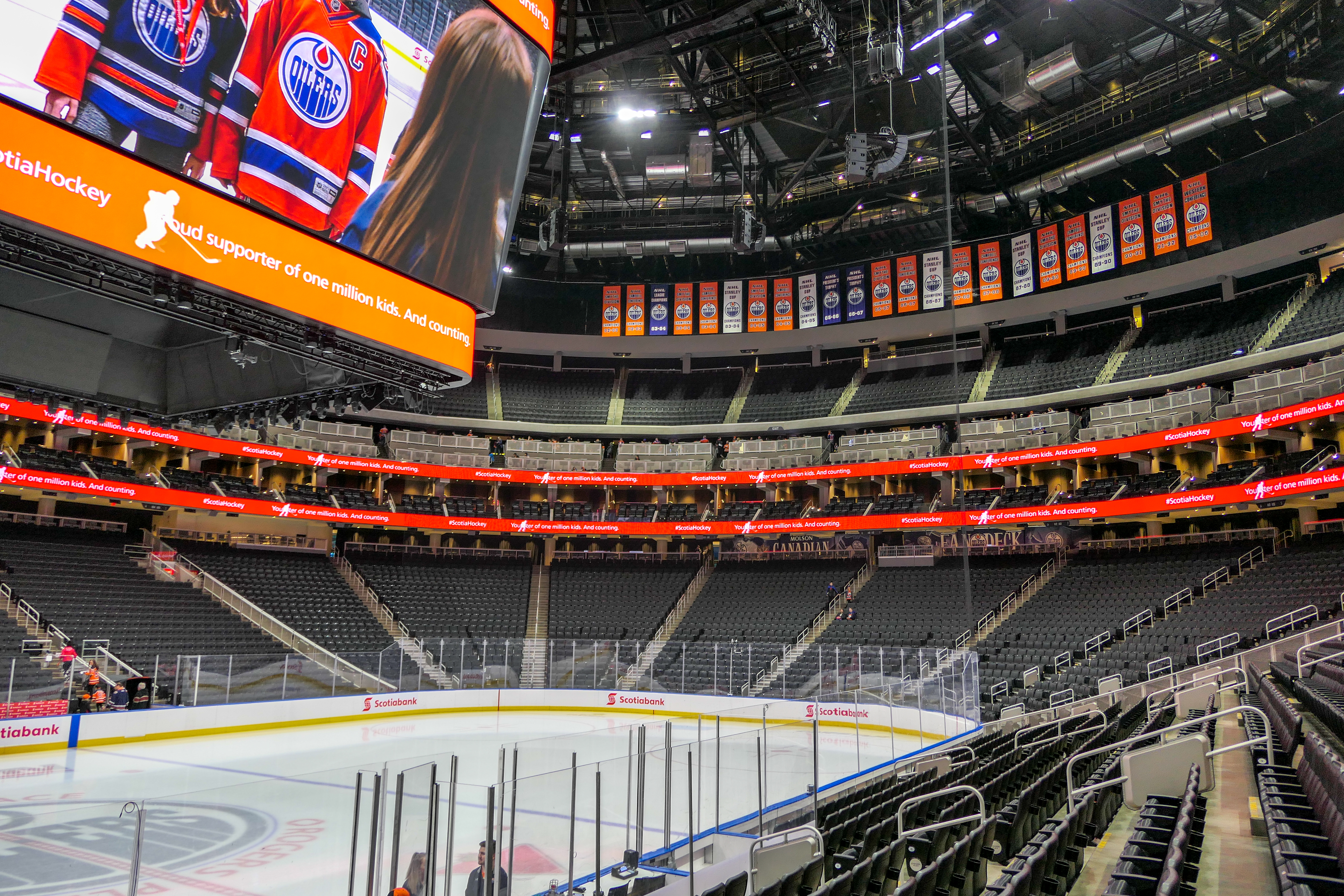
Rogers Place in Edmonton

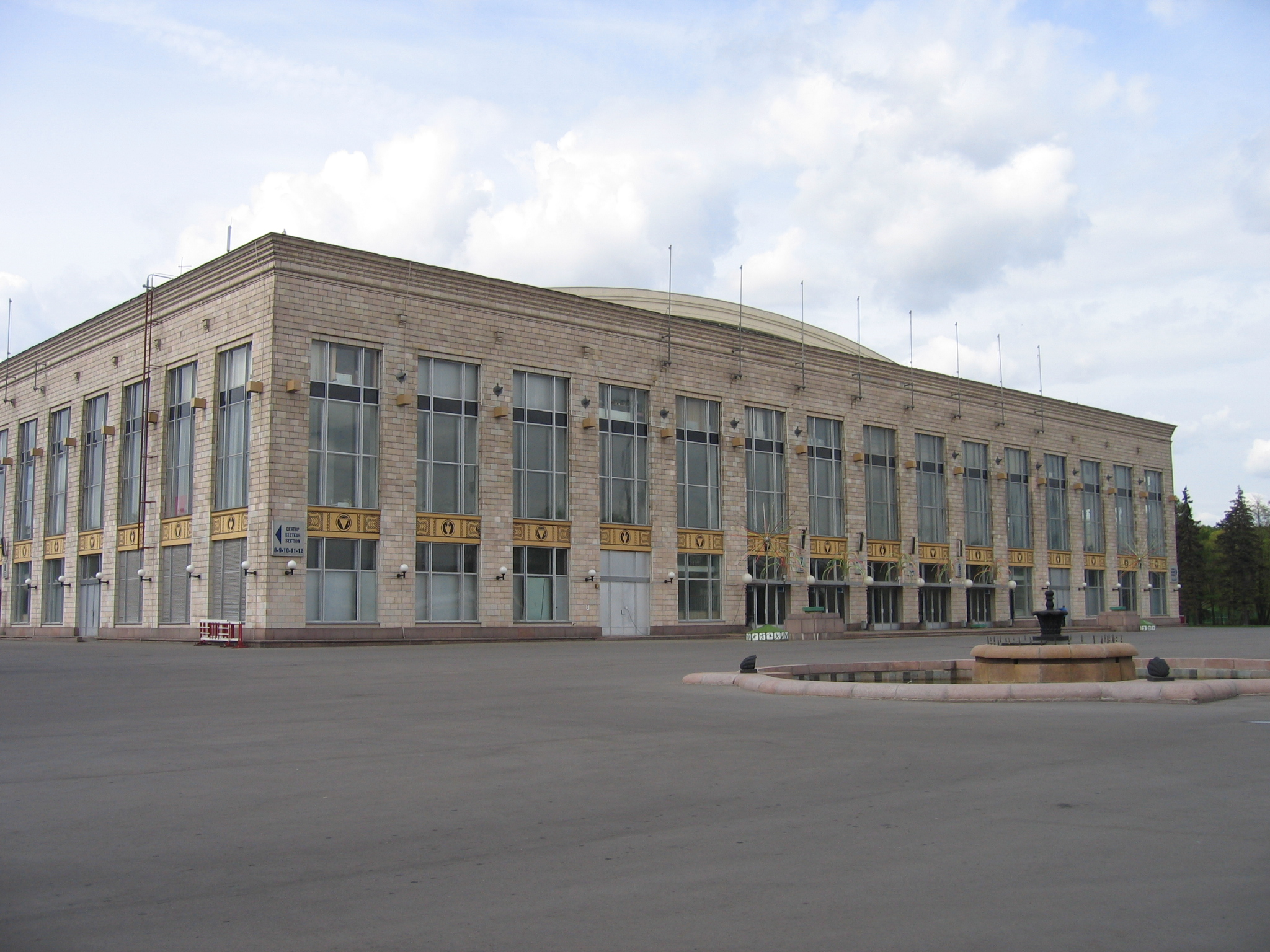
Exterior of the Luzhniki Palace of Sports in Moscow

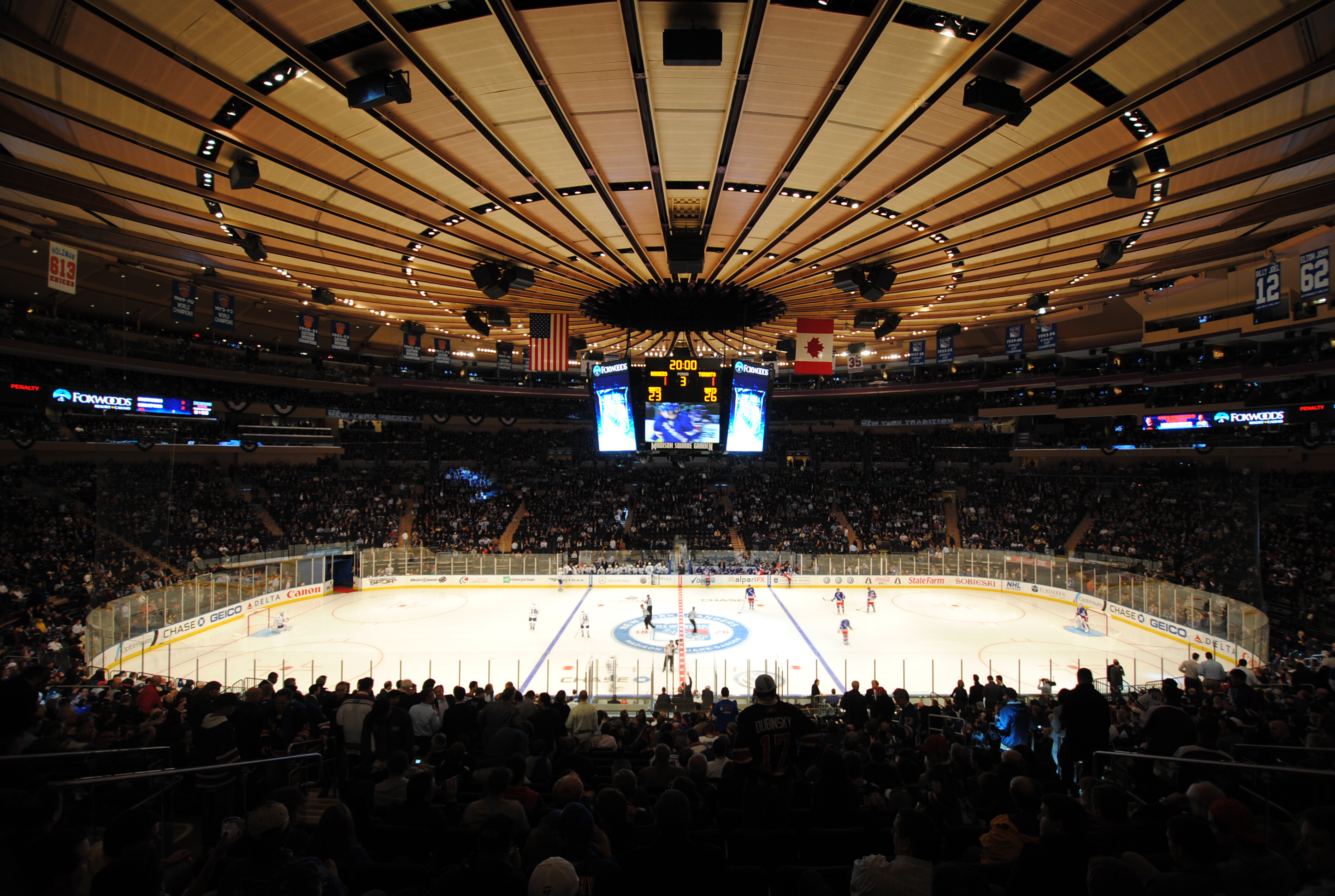
Madison Square Garden in New York

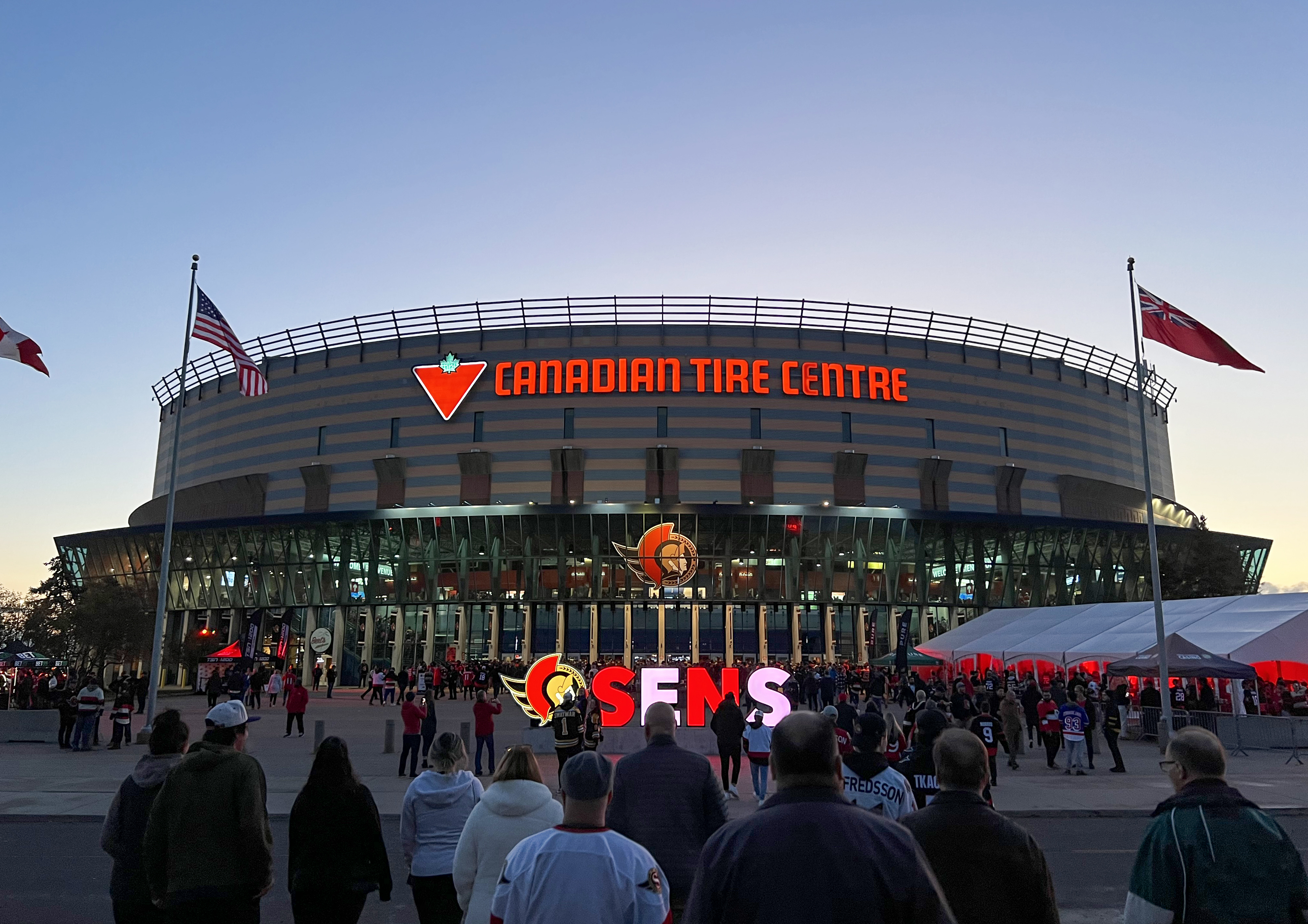
Exterior of the Canadian Tire Centre in Ottawa

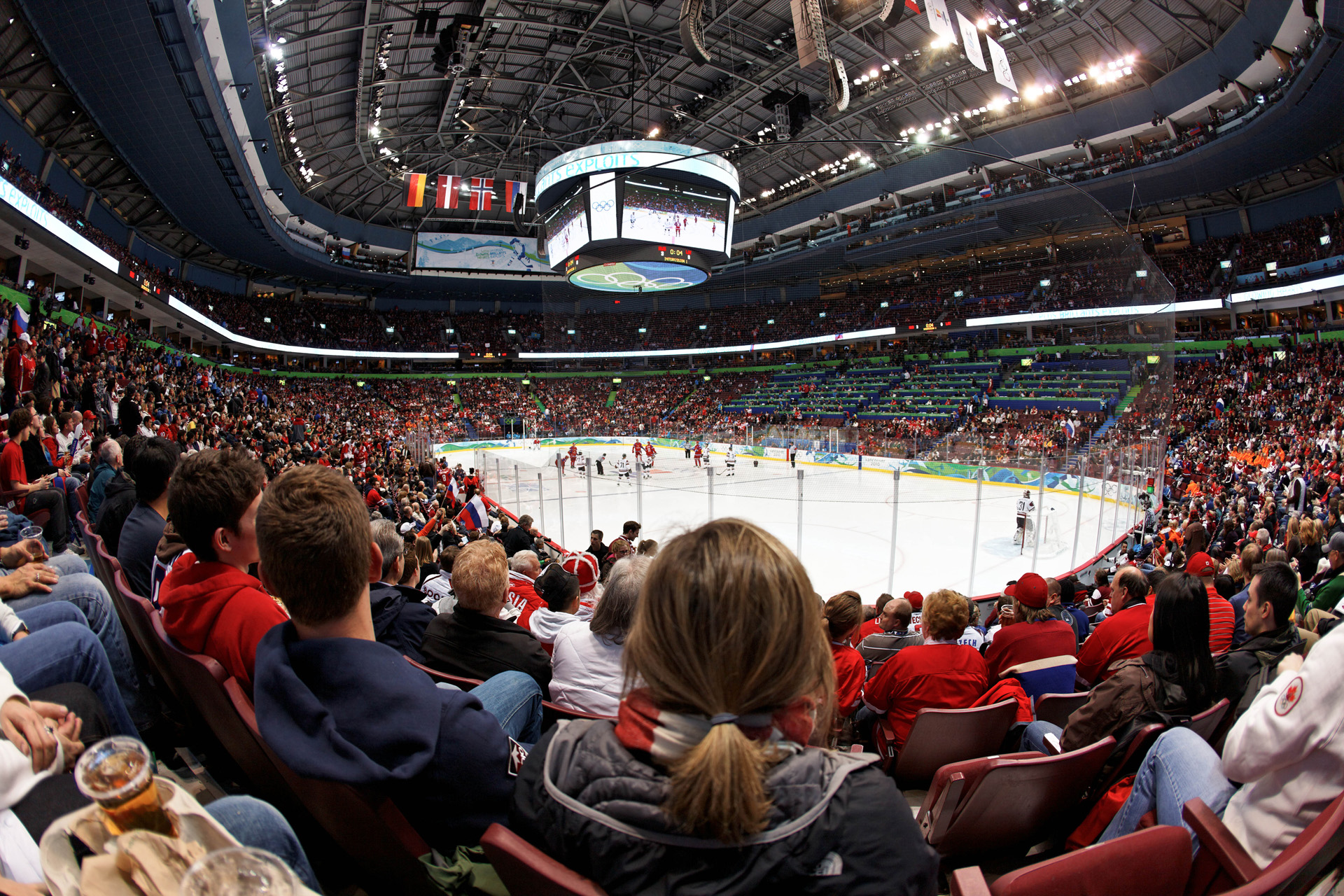
Canada Hockey Place in Vancouver during the 2010 Winter Olympics

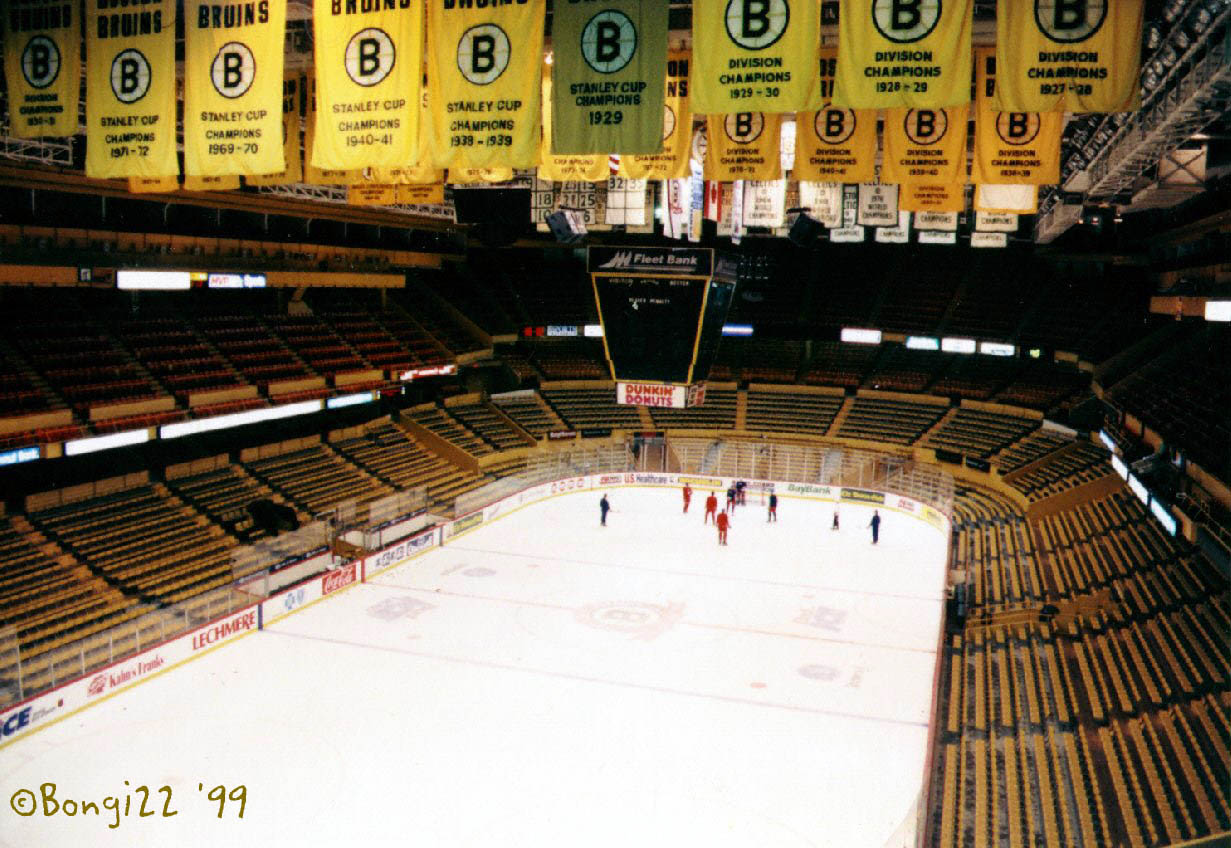
Boston Garden in Boston

== See also ==
- List of ice hockey arenas by capacity
- Ice hockey rink
