= Lancashire Raptors =

Ice hockey team in Lancashire, England

- City: Blackburn, Lancashire, England
- League: English National Ice Hockey League
- Division: North 2
- Founded: 2007
- Home arena: Blackburn Arena
- Colors: Burgundy, Silver and White
- Head coach: Gary Buckman
- Affiliates: Frankie & Benny's, Blackburn

Franchise history
- 2007-2011: Mark Ward, Head Coach

The Lancashire Raptors were an English ice hockey team based in Blackburn, Lancashire. They were members of the English National Ice Hockey League, and have played in the North 2 division. Their home ice was the 3,200-seat Blackburn Arena.

== History ==
In April 2007, the English Ice Hockey Association restructured the age limits for competing players, reclassifying the under 19 age limit as under 18. This left many 19-year-old players in the country without a team to play for regularly. One such team affected was the Blackburn Ice Hockey Development Association (BIHDA), the junior development programme for the Blackburn Hawks; those that were deemed not good enough to play for the Hawks were left with the choice of either recreational hockey or giving up on the sport. This is where the Blackburn Junior Hawks committee stepped in with the decision to set up a second senior team playing at the Arena alongside the Hawks. This team, unlike the Hawks, would get no funding from the Arena: the players would primarily fund the team through monthly subs on the same basis as the junior teams.

Mark Ward was selected to be the Raptors coach after expressing his interest in running the team, which, alongside his wealth of knowledge of the sport, having been a previous coach of the Hawks and many years of playing, made him the ideal man for the job.

The Raptors completed four seasons in the ENIHL North Division 2, following the split in the league for 2008–09. The start of the 2011–12 campaign saw a mass exodus of players to the new Subzero Ice Rink in nearby Cleveleys to play as part of the newly formed Fylde Flyers club. Following the departure of long-standing coach Mark Ward, new coach Gary Buckman, also formerly a coach for the Blackburn Hawks, joined the Raptors setup. The Spirit of the Raptors was to bring through young players from the Blackburn Junior Hawks program into fully fledged senior league players with the assistance of experienced veteran senior league players in their ranks. Offering experience and guidance with the aim of these junior players playing at a senior level with the Raptors first and then becoming future Blackburn Hawks.

== Season-by-season Record ==
Note: GP = Games played, W = Wins, L = Losses, T = Ties, Pts = Points, GF = Goals for, GA = Goals against, PIM = Penalties in minutes.

Season	League	GP	W	L	T	Pts	GF	GA	PIM	Finish	Playoffs/Post-season
2007/08	ENIHL (North Division 2)	22	2	19	1	5	57	164	NA	2nd from bottom in division	N/A
2008/09	ENIHL (North Division 2)	24	2	20	2	6	65	201	NA	Last in division	N/A
2009/10	ENIHL (North Division 2)	24	8	15	1	17	116	146	NA	4th	N/A
2010/11	ENIHL (North Division 2)	24	9	14	1	19	131	160	NA	5th	N/A
2011/12	ENIHL (North Division 2)	28	0	27	1	1	26	277	NA	Last in division	N/A

== Current squad 2011-12 ==
- 1 Matt Milhench (N/M)
- 1 Matt Phair (N/M)
- 2 Patrick Thomson
- 3 Wesley Nixon
- 4 Ryan Hindle
- 5 Paul Burns
- 6 Nick Saxton (N/M)
- 7 Darren Shaw
- 8 Christian Wareing
- 9 Ken Armstrong
- 10 Michael Vigelskas
- 11 Steven Hetherington
- 12 Ben Abbott
- 13 Jack Skipp
- 14 Josh Lee
- 15 Paul Mercer
- 16 Tom Helm
- 17 Christopher Preston
- 18 Craig Summerill
- 19 Anthony Kinder
- 20 Curtis Elliott
- 21 Troy Evans
- 22 Michael Alexander
