= Robert Haigh =

Robert, Bob or Bobby Haigh or Haig may refer to:

- Robert Haig, 14th of Bemersyde (died 1554), Scottish laird; see Earl Haig
- Robert Haig, 16th of Bemersyde (died 1602), Scottish laird
- Robert M. Haig (1887–1953), American economist
- Bob Haigh (born 1943), English rugby league player
- Robert Haigh (field hockey), Australian field hockey player
- Robert Haigh (musician), British musician
- Bobby Haig (born 1969), British ice hockey player and coach
