= Bradford Bulldogs =

Ice hockey team in West Yorkshire, England

- City: Bradford, West Yorkshire
- League: NIHL
- Conference: Division Two North
- Founded: 1976
- Home arena: Bradford Ice Arena
- Colours: Red, Yellow, Black
- General manager: Joanne Gibson (England)
- Head coach: Andy Brown (England)
- Captain: Dean Boothroyd (England)
- Website: Bradford Bulldogs

The Bradford Bulldogs are an English ice hockey team that play in the NIHL North Two (Laidler) Division of the English National Ice Hockey League. They play their home games at the Bradford Ice Arena, Bradford, West Yorkshire.

They were formed in 1976. Many of the team were born and taught to play ice hockey in and around the Bradford area.

The club also features a junior youth system which has teams from under-10 to under-18 level, though anyone older than six is allowed to take part in beginner's sessions which are held at Bradford Ice Arena.

After the 2020-21 season was cancelled because of the ongoing coronavirus pandemic, the Bulldogs returned to action in 2021-22 competing in the NIHL North Two (Laidler) Division. They also have teams at Under-18, Under-16, Under-14, Under-12 and Under-10 level. Over the years, the club has produced a number of players through its junior system who have gone on to play at senior level elsewhere in the UK. Several were signed to the Leeds Knights roster for the 2021-22 NIHL National campaign.

These included forwards, Kieran Brown and Adam Barnes, as well as defenders Bobby Streetly, Lewis Baldwin and Jordan Griffin. Brown and Griffin both served 'apprenticeships' at Sheffield Steelers after being signed by former head coach Paul Thompson - Brown in 2017 and Griffin in 2018.

OLiam Kirk and Cole Shudra - the latter a Knights' team-mate of Brown and Griffin during 2021-22 - were two other players to be signed up on this innovative scheme.

== Club roster 2022-23 ==
(*) Denotes a Non-British Trained player (Import)

Netminders
No.	Nat.	Player	Catches	Date of birth	Place of birth	Acquired	Contract
25	(England)	Samantha Bolwell	L	1 February 1993 (age 33)	Eastbourne, England	2021 from Deeside Dragons	22/23
	(England)	Ryan Wardell	L	30 January 2005 (age 21)	Sunderland, England	2022 from Billingham Stars	Two-Way
	(England)	Callum Preston		2006 (age 16)	England	2022 from Bradford U18	22/23

Defencemen
No.	Nat.	Player	Shoots	Date of birth	Place of birth	Acquired	Contract
4	(England)	David Williams	R	9 March 1985 (age 41)	Bury, England	2017 from Blackburn Eagles	22/23
9	(England)	Matthew Cross		2005 (age 17)	England	2021 from Bradford U18	Two-Way
16	(England)	Benjamin Darbyshire	R	1994 (age 28)	Manchester, England	2021 from Blackburn Hawks 2	22/23
46	(England)	Alexander Mitchell		2002 (age 20)	England	2018 from Bradford U18	22/23
96	(England)	Dean Boothroyd 'C'		1984 (age 38)	Huddersfield, England	2004 from Bradford U19	22/23
	(England)	Kieran Clarkson		2002 (age 20)	England	2022 from Altrincham Aces	22/23
	(England)	James Gledhill		2004 (age 18)	England	2022 from Bradford U18	22/23

Forwards
No.	Nat.	Player	Shoots	Date of birth	Place of birth	Acquired	Contract
6	(England)	Joshua Stockton		6 February 1990 (age 36)	Liversedge, England	2017	22/23
8	(England)	Mark Higson		1989 (age 33)	Radcliffe, England	2016	22/23
11	(England)	Lucas Vince		2004 (age 18)	England	2021 from Bradford U18	Two-Way
26	(Poland)	Kacper Andrukianiec		2003 (age 19)	Poland	2021 from Bradford U18	22/23
29	(Slovakia)	Tomas Mitrik*	R	29 June 1988 (age 38)	Humenne, Slovakia	2018 from Altrincham Aces	22/23
77	(England)	Jack Wooding		2004 (age 18)	England	2021 from Bradford U18	22/23
98	(England)	Abigail Culshaw	R	5 March 1998 (age 28)	England	2019 from Blackburn Hawks 2	22/23
	(England)	Jason Devaney		1991 (age 31)	England	2022	22/23
	(England)	Connor Medley		30 March 1993 (age 33)	England	2017 from Bradford U16	22/23
	(United Kingdom) (Falkland Islands)	Malachi Budd	L	18 October 2003 (age 22)	Falkland Islands	2022 from Vernal Oilers	Two-Way
	(England)	Archie Grayson		2004 (age 18)	England	2022 from Sheffield U18	22/23
	(England)	Rhys Edwards	L	4 June 2006 (age 20)	England	2022 from Bradford U18	Two-Way
	(England)	Thomas Mardell		2006 (age 16)	England	2022 from Bradford U18	22/23

Team Staff
No.	Nat.	Name	Acquired	Role	Place of birth	Joined From
	(England)	Andrew Brown	2014/15	Head coach	Bradford, England	Bradford Bulldogs U18, England U18
	(England)	Joanne Gibson	2015/16	General Manager	England

== 2021/22 Outgoing ==
Outgoing
No.	Nat.	Player	Shoots	Date of birth	Place of birth	Leaving For
19	(England)	Joshua Richardson	R	1998 (age 24)	Chorley, England	Deeside Dragons, NIHL 1
30	(England)	Philip Pearson	L	5 August 1987 (age 39)	Stockport, England	Deeside Dragons, NIHL 1
43	(England)	Damarni James	R	2005 (age 17)	England	Leeds Knights, NIHL National
73	(England)	Alexander Lutwyche		2003 (age 19)	Whalley, England	Blackburn Hawks, NIHL 1
