= Brendan Perlini =

English-Canadian ice hockey player (born 1996)

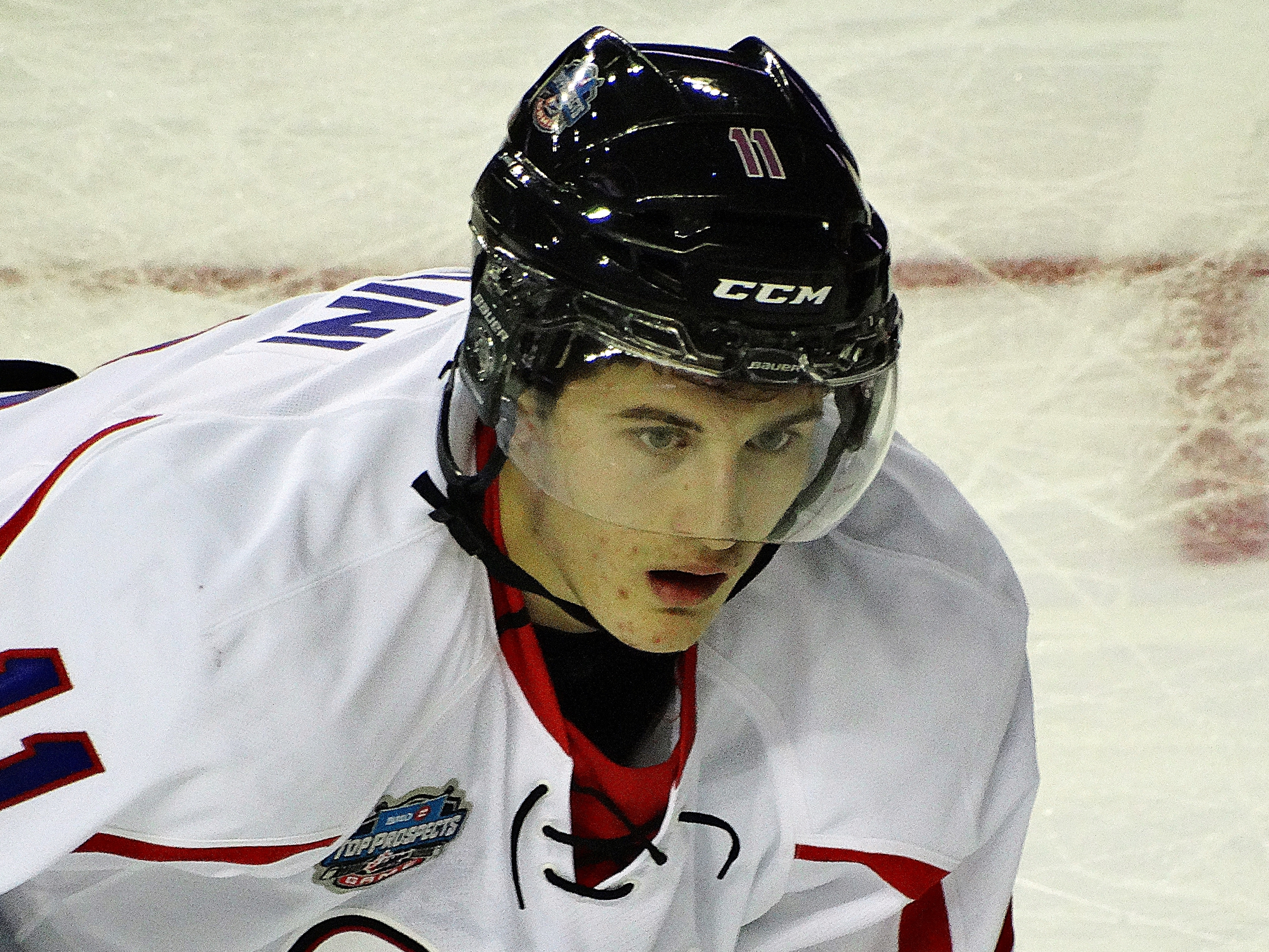
- Perlini in 2014
- Born: April 27, 1996 (age 30) Guildford, England, UK
- Height: 6 ft 3 in (191 cm)
- Weight: 211 lb (96 kg; 15 st 1 lb)
- Position: Left wing
- Shoots: Left
- NL team Former teams: HC Lugano; Arizona Coyotes; Chicago Blackhawks; Detroit Red Wings; HC Ambrì-Piotta; Edmonton Oilers; Spartak Moscow; Lausanne HC
- NHL draft: 12th overall, 2014; Arizona Coyotes
- Playing career: 2015–present

Brendan Perlini (born April 27, 1996) is a Canadian professional ice hockey left winger who currently plays for the HC Lugano of the National League (NL). He most recently played with the Charlotte Checkers in the American Hockey League (AHL).

Perlini was selected by the Arizona Coyotes in the first round (12th overall) of the 2014 NHL entry draft. Born in the United Kingdom, where his father, Fred Perlini, played ice hockey, Perlini grew up there before moving to Canada with his family in 2007. He spent four seasons in the major junior Ontario Hockey League (OHL), and made his NHL debut with the Coyotes in 2016. He's also played for the Chicago Blackhawks and Detroit Red Wings.

Internationally, Perlini played for the Canadian national junior team, and won a bronze medal at the 2014 World Under-18 Championship.

== Playing career ==
Perlini was drafted by the Barrie Colts 16th overall in the 2012 OHL Priority Selection, and began the 2012–13 OHL season with the Colts. After 32 games, in which he recorded one goal and one assist, Perlini was traded to the Niagara IceDogs. During the 2013–14 season, he was recognized for his outstanding play when he was chosen to compete in the 2014 CHL Top Prospects Game.

He was drafted by the Arizona Coyotes, 12th overall in the 2014 NHL entry draft. On July 19, 2014, he was signed to a three-year NHL entry-level contract by the Coyotes.

Perlini began the 2016–17 season with the Tucson Roadrunners, the Coyotes' American Hockey League (AHL) affiliate. After 16 games with the Roadrunners, he was recalled to the Coyotes. At the time, Perlini was tied for the AHL goal scoring lead, with 11, and was the AHL Rookie of the Month for November. He made his NHL debut on December 5, 2016, against the Columbus Blue Jackets. His first goal came on December 10, against Pekka Rinne of the Nashville Predators.

During the 2018–19 season, on November 25, 2018, Perlini and Dylan Strome were traded to the Chicago Blackhawks in exchange for Nick Schmaltz. He finished the season with 21 points in 68 games.

On September 6, 2019, the Blackhawks re-signed Perlini to a one-year, $874,125 contract extension. Perlini began the 2019–20 season as a healthy scratch for the Blackhawks. After appearing in just one of Chicago's opening 10 games, Perlini requested to be traded on October 25. He was traded to the Detroit Red Wings in exchange for Alec Regula on October 28.

On January 23, 2021, Perlini joined HC Ambrì-Piotta of the Swiss National League (NL) as a replacement for injured Julius Nättinen for the remainder of the 2020–21 season. In 21 games, Perlini rediscovered his scoring touch, registering 9 goals and 16 points.

As a free agent in the following off-season, Perlini returned to North America in signing a one-year, two-way contract with the Edmonton Oilers on August 7, 2021.

Following his tenure with the Chicago Wolves of the AHL for the 2022–23 season, Perlini remained un-signed over the summer. He was later signed to a professional tryout contract to attend the Carolina Hurricanes training camp in preparation for the 2023–24 season on August 29, 2023. After he was released following training camp with the Hurricanes, Perlini returned to the AHL by signing a PTO with the Florida Panthers affiliate, the Charlotte Checkers, on October 17, 2023.

On December 10th, 2024, Perlini signed a deal with Spartak Moscow of the Kontinental Hockey League (KHL). On January 19th, 2025, Spartak and Perlini agreed to terminate his contract.

On February 12th, 2025, Perlini signed with the Lausanne HC of the Swiss National League until the end of the 2024-25 season.

On July 8th, 2025, Perlini signed a one-year contract with the HC Lugano, staying in the NL.

== Personal life ==
Perlini was born in the United Kingdom, while his father, Fred Perlini, was playing ice hockey. His father, who was drafted by the Toronto Maple Leafs in the 1980 NHL entry draft and played eight games for them, spent the majority of his career in the AHL before continuing in the United Kingdom. After he retired from playing in 1997, Fred took up a coaching position with the Guildford Flames, and returned to Canada with his family in 2007, moving to Sault Ste. Marie, Ontario. His older brother, Brett Perlini, was selected in the seventh round of the 2010 NHL entry draft by the Anaheim Ducks and played in the ECHL.

== Career statistics ==
=== Regular season and playoffs ===
			Regular season					Playoffs
Season	Team	League	GP	G	A	Pts	PIM	GP	G	A	Pts	PIM
2012–13	Barrie Colts	OHL	32	1	1	2	4	—	—	—	—	—
2012–13	Niagara IceDogs	OHL	27	7	3	10	4	5	1	2	3	4
2013–14	Niagara IceDogs	OHL	58	34	37	71	36	7	0	1	1	6
2014–15	Niagara IceDogs	OHL	43	26	34	60	22	11	7	5	12	7
2014–15	Portland Pirates	AHL	—	—	—	—	—	4	1	0	1	0
2015–16	Niagara IceDogs	OHL	57	25	20	45	28	14	6	3	9	9
2016–17	Tucson Roadrunners	AHL	17	14	5	19	14	—	—	—	—	—
2016–17	Arizona Coyotes	NHL	57	14	7	21	20	—	—	—	—	—
2017–18	Arizona Coyotes	NHL	74	17	13	30	28	—	—	—	—	—
2018–19	Arizona Coyotes	NHL	22	2	4	6	8	—	—	—	—	—
2018–19	Chicago Blackhawks	NHL	46	12	3	15	20	—	—	—	—	—
2019–20	Chicago Blackhawks	NHL	1	0	0	0	0	—	—	—	—	—
2019–20	Detroit Red Wings	NHL	39	1	3	4	10	—	—	—	—	—
2020–21	HC Ambrì-Piotta	NL	21	9	7	16	26	—	—	—	—	—
2021–22	Edmonton Oilers	NHL	23	4	1	5	6	—	—	—	—	—
2021–22	Bakersfield Condors	AHL	18	11	7	18	20	3	1	2	3	2
2022–23	Chicago Wolves	AHL	26	10	5	15	12	—	—	—	—	—
2023–24	Charlotte Checkers	AHL	37	9	11	20	26	1	1	0	1	2
2024–25	HC Spartak Moscow	KHL	4	0	1	1	0	—	—	—	—	—
2024–25	Lausanne HC	NL	4	1	1	2	31	7	1	1	2	4
2025–26	HC Lugano	NL	34	4	8	12	43	—	—	—	—	—
NHL totals			262	50	31	81	92	—	—	—	—	—
NL totals			59	14	16	30	100	7	1	1	2	4
KHL totals			4	0	1	1	0	—	—	—	—	—

Medal record

Representing Canada

Ice hockey

IIHF World U18 Championship
Bronze medal – third place	2014 Finland	

=== International ===
Year	Team	Event	Result	GP	G	A	Pts	PIM
2014	Canada	U18	3rd place, bronze medalist(s)	7	3	1	4	6
2016	Canada	WJC	6th	5	0	0	0	6
Junior totals				12	3	1	4	12

== See also ==
- List of National Hockey League players born in the United Kingdom

Awards and achievements
Preceded by Max Domi	Arizona Coyotes first-round draft pick 2014	Succeeded by Dylan Strome
