= Blackburn Hawks =

Ice hockey team in Lancashire, England

- City: Blackburn, Lancashire, England
- League: NIHL1
- Division: Division 1 North
- Founded: 1990
- Home arena: Blackburn Arena
- Colors: Red, Yellow and White
- Mascot: Harvey The Hawk
- Owners: Graham Lomax, Scott Jenkinson, Graham Smith
- General manager: Scott Jenkinson
- Head coach: Ollie Lomax
- Asst. coach: Andy McKinney
- Captain: Andy McKinney
- Affiliates: Manchester Storm, EIHL; Hull Seahawks, NIHL National

Franchise history
- 1990–1992: Blackhawks
- 1992–1997: Blackburn Hawks
- 1997–1998: Lancashire Hawks
- 1998 - Date: Blackburn Hawks

The Blackburn Hawks (formerly known as the Blackhawks and the Lancashire Hawks) are an English ice hockey team based in Blackburn, Lancashire. They are presently affiliated with the EIHA Moralee Conference (NIHL N1) and have previously competed in the British National League and the English League Premier Division. The team's home venue is the Blackburn Arena, which has a seating capacity of 3,200.

== History ==
=== The Blackhawks era ===
The Blackburn Blackhawks logo

The Blackhawks achieved their inaugural victory on 28 October 1990 by defeating the Oxford City Stars with a score of 6–3. The game took place as a non-import challenge match, where no professional players born outside of the United Kingdom participated. Throughout the subsequent 1990–91 season, all Blackhawks games were played away from home, as the newly constructed Blackburn Arena was not yet completed. The team's first home game occurred on 26 January 1991, coinciding with another 6–3 victory against Oxford. The inaugural goal scored at the arena was by Blackhawks' Dan Holden, an offensive defenseman who amassed a total of 116 points during the season. The leading points scorer for the Blackhawks in the 1990–91 season was Fred Perlini, who contributed 132 points (83 goals and 49 assists) in just 21 games. Among the notable players were Gary Shearman, Trevor Foster, Georgie Powell, and Paul Fleury. Under the management of Keith Purvis and coaching of Pete Murray, the Blackhawks secured fourth place in the English League Division One. Additionally, following the dissolution of Solihull, the Blackhawks were promoted to the Heineken League.

In the 1991–92 season, the team was managed by Doug McKay, a former coach for the Toronto Maple Leafs. However, his tenure was brief due to financial difficulties, leading to the departure of the Blackhawks' management. Consequently, by the end of the season, the Blackhawks were relegated to the English League Division One.

=== Building to league success ===
In the 1992–93 season, the team underwent a rebuilding phase and adopted the new name Blackburn Hawks. Canadian Glenn Knight initially served as player-coach, but later transferred the coaching duties to the team's new addition, former AHL forward Steve Moria. The team's financial situation improved following a buyout by Peel Holdings, the firm that owned the site of the Blackburn Arena. This change in financial status facilitated the recruitment of new imports to the team.

The Hawks secured victories against the Milton Keynes Kings early in the season and performed competitively throughout, narrowly missing out on a playoff spot. The season was regarded as a "tremendous season and certainly one that the Hawks' faithful should remember for a long time to come."

Before the start of the 1994–95 season, the Hawks faced turmoil when Steve Moria departed for the Swindon Wildcats. Inexperienced forward Mark Stokes stepped up to assume the role of player-coach. The season marked the Hawks' most challenging B&H Cup campaign, with six consecutive defeats. Nonetheless, the Hawks garnered attention for other achievements.

The British Ice Hockey Association imposed bans on new imports Sverre Sears, Matt Zilinskas, and Jeff Winstanley after they were featured on the front page of the Lancashire Evening Telegraph for a late-night naked skating session. Consequently, they were dismissed from the club, prompting a staffing overhaul. Former Toronto Maple Leaf Rocky Saganiuk arrived, pledging to secure a playoff spot for the fans. Saganiuk recruited Trent Casey, Darren Durdle, and Tony Cimellaro. However, the Hawks' defensive vulnerabilities contributed to their relegation to Division Two by the end of the season. Nonetheless, a last-minute league restructuring resulted in the team starting the new season back in Division One.

Prior to the start of the 1995–96 campaign, it was announced that Saganiuk would not be returning, opting to remain in Canada. Under the management of Mike Cockayne, the Hawks secured sponsorship with Thwaites Beer and debuted new red, black, and yellow uniforms at the beginning of the season.

During the season, the Hawks achieved their first-ever top position in the league standings, notably securing a significant victory of 12–9 over the newly formed Manchester Storm. This match took place at the Nynex Arena, attracting a then-record crowd of 9,500 spectators and garnering millions of viewers on Sky TV, marking the first live UK hockey match broadcast on satellite television in the UK. Later in the season, the Hawks returned to the Nynex Arena for a league title decider, which set another British attendance record of 16,280 spectators.

=== The Northern Premier League ===
The Lancashire Hawks logo

In the 1996–97 season, the Hawks welcomed a new coach, Jim Pennycook, a highly experienced player in the British ice hockey scene. This season marked the inception of the Ice Hockey Superleague, a televised league that divided British ice hockey teams based on their financial standing. Blackburn was not included in this new league and instead participated in the Northern Premier League of the BNL, which imposed a limit of three imports per team.

The Hawks encountered challenges early in the season, losing two of their three imports before the end of November. Coach Pennycook played through injury for most of the season, and the team faced roster shortages after Christmas, with only eight players available for some games. However, they made new signings before the transfer deadline and concluded the season with a mid-table position.

Ahead of the 1997–98 season, the team underwent another name change, rebranding as the Lancashire Hawks in an effort to promote the team across the county. However, attendance figures did not see significant improvement, and many fans voiced their disapproval of the new name.

The Hawks faced a series of challenges including staffing issues, injuries, and roster changes, leading to their bottom-place finish in the league and elimination in the playoffs.

=== The Bobby Haig era ===
In the 1998–99 season, the team participated in another new league, the English League Premier Division. This league was established for teams aiming to compete effectively on a smaller budget than those in the British National League. Competing against teams like Solihull, Swindon, and Milton Keynes, the team reverted to its previous name, the Blackburn Hawks, following pressure from the management team at the Supporters Club annual general meeting held in the Arena bar in May 1998.

Jim Pennycook returned to the Arena in a playing role, while the Arena management sought a new coach for the season. Bobby Haig, an experienced Scotsman and brother of former Hawk John, assumed the role with the aim of restoring the team to its former success.

The season commenced with a decisive victory over the Wightlink Raiders, securing a 13–1 win. However, controversy arose at the start of 1999 when it was revealed that the team had exceeded their season's budget threefold by Christmas. In response, five players, including import Chad Brandimore and club captain Simon Mills, were released from their contracts to alleviate the financial strain on the club. By mid-March, the team faced challenges in the league standings, leading to the realization that they would not participate in the end-of-season playoffs due to financial difficulties. Nevertheless, fan support remained strong, with nearly 1,500 attendees witnessing a 10–9 victory over Chelmsford and a close 7–6 defeat against Milton Keynes at the end of the league campaign. The win against Chelmsford marked the team's highest number of home game victories in a season since its establishment in 1991.

Amid the financial challenges at the season's conclusion, concerns and rumors regarding the club's future surfaced. Some speculated that Blackburn might not field a competitive ice hockey team for the 1999–2000 campaign. Additionally, certain media outlets reported that the team faced potential expulsion from the league due to their decision not to participate in the playoffs.

The decision to move down to the English League Division One elicited a mixed response from fans, mainly due to concerns about the availability of skilled import players in the league. To increase their game count, the team also joined the Border League, comprising teams from Scotland and northern England. Led by Haig, the Hawks narrowly missed out on securing a playoff spot at the season's conclusion.

During the 2000–2001 season, under the guidance of Bobby Haig, the Hawks competed in the English National Ice Hockey League (formerly known as ED1). The season began with a mix of results, including a 14–1 loss to the Kingston Jets and a 14–0 victory over the Bradford Bulldogs, all before Christmas. The team also retained the North West Cup by defeating the Altrincham Aces. However, on 27 January 2001 the Aces avenged their loss by eliminating Blackburn from the English Cup. The team concluded the season in fourth place in the league.

On 3 April 2001 the Blackburn Hawks commemorated their 10th anniversary with a special event featuring the return of Steve Moria and numerous former players. The game, which pitted Bobby Haig's All Stars against Steve Moria's Select, concluded with a 9–8 victory for Moria's team. The match drew a crowd of over 1,000 spectators and raised £4,000 for the NSPCC (National Society for the Prevention of Cruelty to Children).

During the 2001–2002 season, the Hawks concluded with a fourth-place position in the ENIHL North Division, marking a less successful period for the team. During this season, the team faced challenges, losing all six games in the ENIHL Cup and failing to advance past the group stages in the English cup. This pattern established a precedent for the Hawks, with subsequent seasons often seeing them secure a place in the league's top five, achieving a moderate performance in the cup competitions, and Bobby Haig emerging as the team's top scorer.

During the 2002–2003 season, the team finished fifth in the league and narrowly missed reaching the final of the English National Premier Cup, securing the second position in the qualifying table. However, their performance in the Northern Cup was less successful, as they did not win a single game in the competition.

Following a weekend with no points mid-season, Haig suggested that the team's lack of success may be attributed to the absence of younger players, stating, "We had no Under 19s and we also found it difficult to raise our game after the disappointment of (an 8–2 defeat at) Sheffield. Perhaps we need an injection of some new players. It's been a bad weekend and I have got some serious thinking to do."

One of the new young players recruited by Haig was 19-year-old Richard Hulme, who made his debut in a challenge match against Spartak Durham. Hulme, who emerged from the Hawks' youth teams, became involved in a controversial incident.

In October 2003, towards the end of an under 19 game against the Altrincham Tigers, Hulme was assaulted and injured by Tigers' player Robert Brownbill. Hulme suffered the loss of two teeth and a broken jaw when struck by Brownbill's fist during the game. In January 2003, Brownbill faced charges of assaulting Hulme, causing actual bodily harm, before the Preston Crown Court. In a landmark case for the sport, Brownbill was initially remanded on bail, marking the first instance of its kind in the country. Eventually, Brownbill received a fine of £250, setting a precedent in the sport.

As anticipated, Haig concluded the season as the team's leading scorer, ranking fourth in the league with 56 points accumulated over 18 games. Notably, the three top scorers above Haig hailed from the league-winning team, Altrincham.

=== A new look and a new start ===
The Blackburn Hawks logo (2003 onwards)

The 2003–2004 season began on a promising note with several enhancements, including a new logo, redesigned team uniforms, and the renewal of the sponsorship agreement with Thwaites Brewery. Coupled with a crop of promising young players, this left Haig and the new team captain, Neil Haworth, optimistic ahead of the opening game. The team's thorough preparations yielded positive results as they secured a 13–2 victory over the Bradford Bulldogs and followed it up with a commanding 20–3 win against the Grimsby Buffaloes during the first weekend of the season.

Despite the promising start, the Hawks' success did not endure throughout the season. They secured a fourth position in the league, experienced defeats in every game of the Premier Cup, and concluded as runners-up in the playoffs table, falling short of reaching the final. Throughout these challenges, Haig remained a consistent performer at Blackburn, achieving another impressive season with 52 points in 18 games, ranking as the fifth-highest points scorer in the league.

In the subsequent season, despite early optimism, the Hawks faced similar challenges. A string of disappointing outcomes raised concerns about player/coach Haig's position, prompting him to consider seeking opportunities elsewhere. Following discussions with Arena management and club owners, Haig opted to remain with a renewed focus solely on coaching the senior team, relinquishing his roles as duty manager and junior ice hockey development director.

By mid-November, the team's prospects in the Premier Cup were dim, but they fared better in the league, leading comfortably in the North division. Their championship aspirations received a boost when a 4–2 loss against the Swindon Wildcats was overturned to a 5–0 victory by the EIHA due to Swindon fielding an ineligible player.

The team concluded the ENIHL season in third place, falling short of advancing to the playoff group stages. Additionally, they suffered defeats in every game of the ENIHL cup.

During the 2005–2006 season, the team secured a third-place finish in the ENHL, granting them entry to the group stages of the playoffs following a modification in the playoff format. Despite a second-place finish in the playoff group stages table, the Hawks fell short of reaching the final. In other cup competitions, their performance was mixed; they reached the semi-final of the ENIHL Cup, losing 7–5 to Cardiff, but ended up at the bottom of group C in the Premier Cup.

In the subsequent season, the Hawks experienced a deviation from their typical performance pattern. They concluded the season in fifth place in ENIHL, thus missing out on playoffs. Additionally, they secured fifth place in the Northern League and narrowly missed the playoffs in the ENIHL cup due to goal difference. In a departure from previous seasons, the team's leading scorer was David Meikle, tallying 35 points in 16 games, marking the first time in several seasons that Haig did not hold the top scoring position.

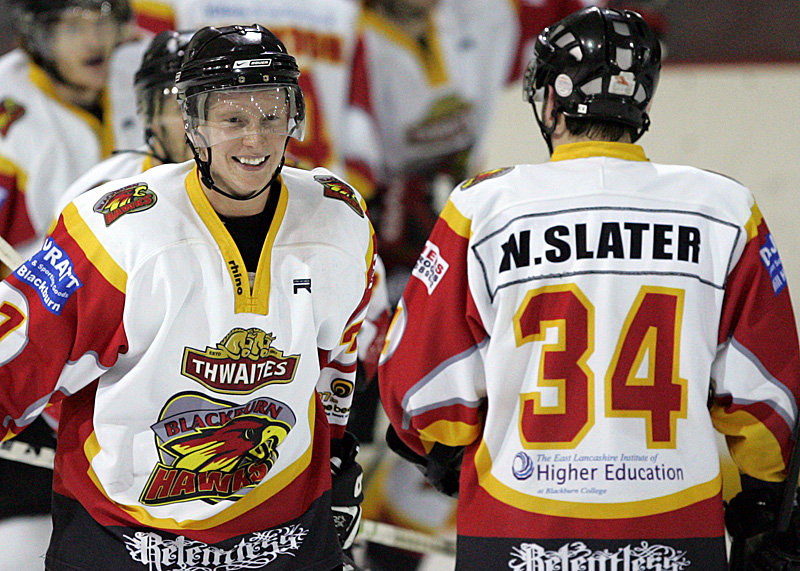
The Blackburn Hawks jersey (2008/9 season)

=== Decline and relegation ===
At the outset of the 2007 season, the team experienced the departure of stalwart Haig, who returned to his former club, the Braehead Pirates. Coaching responsibilities were assumed by Ian Hough and John Dunford.

During a varied season, the club experienced no triumphs in the ENIHL cup, concluding the season at the bottom of the Northern League and securing sixth place in ENIHL North. Despite the challenges, the team delivered several commendable performances. Rick Bentham and David Meikle formed an impressive duo, scoring 48 and 46 points, respectively. The goaltenders also excelled during the season, with Daniel Brittle achieving a 90.03% save percentage in 21 games, while Ian Thirkettle reached 89.08% in 18 games.

In the 2008–2009 season, the ENIHL underwent a restructuring with a new four-division format: North 1 and 2, South 1 and 2, featuring promotion and relegation between the divisions. The Hawks participated in the North 1 division and opted out of the Northern League. Coached by Neil Abel, the Hawks finished second to last in the ENIHL North 1 division, leading to their involvement in a relegation series against local rival Manchester Phoenix ENL. After a closely contested first leg at the Blackburn Arena, the Hawks suffered a loss of 8–7, resulting in a 10–9 aggregate score. Initially, this defeat would have led the team to compete in ENL North 2 for the 2009/10 season. However, Billingham Bombers' withdrawal from the league spared Blackburn from relegation.

=== Rebuilding ===
Spared from relegation due to league restructuring, the Hawks started to ascend from the bottom of the league, gradually challenging higher positions. They secured a fifth-place finish in the subsequent season, which was then improved upon with a fourth-place position, earning them a spot in the postseason. Qualifying for the playoffs after a three-year hiatus, the Hawks were narrowly edged out by Whitley Bay in the semi-final, despite a thrilling 4–2 victory against the undefeated regular season champions in the first leg at Blackburn Arena. Establishing the arena as a formidable venue for postseason matches would prove pivotal for future successes.

In the following year, Blackburn, anticipated to contend for the title, experienced their customary slow start to the season, trailing behind the previous year's champions, Whitley Warriors, and the commanding leaders, Billingham Stars. However, with the addition of Finnish import Sami Narkia, the Hawks embarked on an impressive streak of results. Despite falling short of closing the gap at the top of the league, there was a tangible belief within the squad that they were now equipped to vie for playoff victory.

In the semi-final, the Hawks once again triumphed over the Whitley Warriors with a 4–2 victory at home. This time, they secured the win in the away leg, earning a spot in the final. Facing the Billingham Stars in the final, the home leg drew a crowd of 1,300 fans at the Blackburn Arena, generating an electric atmosphere. The Hawks secured a narrow 2–1 win, setting up a closely contested second leg. However, a controversial decision to dismiss netminder Daniel Brittle early in the second leg worked in favor of Billingham, leading to a 7-5 aggregate victory for the league champions and denying Blackburn a chance to end their 22-year wait for silverware.

=== Playoff champions and league challengers ===
Following a disappointing end to the season, the Hawks faced a challenging summer marked by restructuring both on and off the ice. Several key players departed, opting to join local rivals such as the newly reformed Deeside Dragons and Altrincham-based Trafford Metros. Fans and local commentators expressed disappointment over what they perceived as a missed opportunity to build upon one of the team's most successful campaigns in recent memory. Consequently, the Hawks were widely predicted to face relegation in the upcoming season.

Despite facing challenges, the team embarked on a quiet rebuild, focusing on nurturing talented young players eager to make their mark. An inexperienced side, supplemented by former EPL forward Dan MacKriel and new Latvian import Ivo Dimitrievs, with the later addition of Aaron Davies, launched a campaign for a trophy.

Blackburn once again secured a playoff spot and encountered a two-legged semi-final against the dominant league champions, the Solway Sharks, who suffered only one defeat in the 2012/13 season. Despite being underestimated, the Hawks managed a commendable 5–3 defeat in Dumfries, followed by a remarkable 6–1 triumph at the Blackburn Arena, leading to a consecutive Blackburn-Billingham final.

In a repeat of the previous year, fans packed 'The Nest', generating an electrifying atmosphere as Aaron Davies, Sam Dunford, and Myles Dacres secured a 3–2 victory for the Hawks, giving them a one-goal lead to take to the North East.

The 2013/14 season commenced with four consecutive victories, but a downturn in performance led to a rapid decline in the league standings, seemingly removing the team from the title contention before half of the season had elapsed. However, the acquisition of new signings, including former Manchester Minotaurs' captain Jake Nurse and Canadian import Jon Adams, revitalized the season. A streak of nine consecutive wins propelled the club back up the table, and from December onwards, the team suffered only two defeats in all competitions, both against the League Champions Solway Sharks.

The Hawks secured a playoff berth once more after finishing 2nd in the League, matching their highest-ever finish. Following a tense semi-final against Billingham, the Hawks advanced to face Solway in the final. However, the Scots demonstrated their prowess by completing a League, Cup, and Playoffs hat trick with a 2–0 victory.

The 2014/15 season marks a significant milestone in the club's 25-year history. Under the leadership of Jared Owen, the Hawks secured their first league title, clinching the Moralee Conference with 6 games remaining. They achieved an undefeated league season, earning them the moniker "invincibles." Additionally, Blackburn triumphed in the playoffs, overcoming the Billingham Stars 6–3 in the final after defeating the Sheffield Spartans 4–2 in the semi-final.

The club enjoyed success in the end-of-season awards, with captain Chris Arnone winning the fans' favorite award, Adam Brittle being voted as the league player of the season, and Jared Owen receiving the coach of the year accolade. Off the ice, attendance figures soared, exceeding 1,000 on several occasions, reminiscent of the vibrant support witnessed during the early to mid-nineties. Furthermore, over 700 Blackburn fans traveled to attend the playoff weekend in Solway, highlighting the strong support base of the club.

=== The double double, a new low point, and rebuilding again ===
After the unbeaten season in 2014/15, Jared Owen departed from the club, leaving Daniel MacKriel to assume the role of player/coach. The club aimed to solidify its position at the top of the NIHL pyramid, a goal they achieved by securing another double. They clinched the title with a victory over the Solway Sharks and followed it up with a strong win in the Playoff Final against the Solihull Barons. A notable highlight from that season was forward RJay Berra's mid-season move to the Elite League side, Edinburgh Capitals.

At the time of his departure, Berra had played 27 games for the club, accumulating an impressive 71 points, placing him among the top scorers. He was only outscored by Adam Brittle and Richard Bentham, who both ended the season with 84 points each.

Following the post-season, several key players departed the team, including all three Brittle brothers, captain Chris Arnone, and others. This personnel shift, coupled with the entry of several Premier League teams into the NIHL, resulted in the team struggling during the subsequent season. However, a late-season surge ensured the team's continued presence in the NIHL Moralee division for another year. Illustrating the decline in the club's fortunes following the player exodus, Bentham's points tally dropped to 47, a decrease of 37 points compared to the previous year. Despite this decline, he remained the team's highest points scorer.

In the subsequent seasons, the Hawks maintained competitiveness against teams of similar skill level but faced challenges against former Premier League teams. Czech forward Petr Valusiak concluded the season with a respectable 57 points, marking the highest tally of any Hawks player since the 2015/16 season.

In the 2019/20 season opener, Blackburn began with a 7–3 away victory against Nottingham Lions. However, the season proved challenging for the Hawks, winning only 7 out of 24 league games. They faced 16 defeats and an additional overtime loss. In total, the Hawks earned 15 points, marking their lowest total since the 1997/98 season. They finished 6th out of 7 teams, surpassing only the Nottingham Lions, who lost all 24 matches.

After the conclusion of the season, it was revealed that the Hawks had requested demotion to the Laidler Division due to financial constraints, indicating an inability to sustain themselves in the Moralee Division. This decision received a mixed reaction from fans and surprise from divisional rivals.

Due to the impact of COVID-19, the plans for demotion were postponed as the 2020/21 season was canceled. Eventually, the decision was reversed following a change in club ownership, with new co-owner Graham Lomax confirming that the club would remain in the Moralee Division.

In 2021, Blackburn Hawks participated in a mini-tournament alongside Widnes Wild, Sheffield Scimitars, and Nottingham Lions. While they suffered a significant defeat against Widnes in the first game, losing 9–3, the Hawks rebounded with four consecutive wins, netting 22 goals in total. However, a loss to Widnes in the final match prevented the Hawks from clinching the tournament victory. When league play resumed after the COVID-19 hiatus, the Hawks concluded the 2021/2022 season in 7th place, a disappointing finish, but they were spared relegation playoffs due to the suspension of the promotion/relegation system.

=== Return to Winning Times ===
In recent seasons, Blackburn Hawks remained in the lower-mid table, prompting another significant departure of players from the team, many of whom joined either Deeside Dragons or Widnes Wild. However, a positive development occurred in the summer of 2023 when perennial champions Solway Sharks moved up to the National League. This move helped to level the playing field in the Moralee Conference in terms of skill level. While Blackburn Hawks weren't in contention for the title against runaway leaders Billingham Stars, they found themselves on more equal footing with most teams in the division. This change allowed Blackburn's youthful team to mature, leading to an upturn in performances during the 2023/24 season.

Blackburn achieved a commendable second-place finish in the Northern League, trailing only behind the Edinburgh Capitals. Additionally, they secured victory in the M56 Cup. A noteworthy achievement followed when they defeated league leaders Billingham Stars with an aggregate score of 21–6 in the Moralee Cup (13–4 at home and 8–2 away). This victory marked Blackburn's first major silverware since the prosperous period of the mid-2010s.

Blackburn Hawks earned a spot in the playoffs by securing third place with 44 points, falling just four points shy of the champions, Billingham Stars. In the quarter-finals, they defeated Hull Jets with an aggregate score of 8–4. Moving on to the semi-finals, Blackburn Hawks staged a remarkable comeback, overcoming Solihull Barons 5–4 after trailing behind four times. The final proved to be another challenging encounter as Blackburn Hawks found themselves trailing 3–0 against Billingham late into the second period. However, they mounted a comeback, eventually clinching victory on penalties. This triumph marked their first playoff success in eight years, concluding a season filled with trophies.

2024/25 followed a similar pattern, albeit without trophy success. There was improvement in the league, with a second place finish, the highest since the mid-2010s, totalling 89 points after only 6 defeats, qualifying for the end of season playoffs. The Hawks beat Nottingham Lions 16-8 in the Quarter Finals, before again coming from behind to get past Solihull Barons by a score of 8-5, but Billingham Stars got their revenge for the previous seasons defeat in the final with a 6-3 win over the Hawks at Ice Sheffield. It was the first Playoff Final loss for the Hawks since 2014, and the first against Billingham since 2012. It was the same in the Moralee Cup, with the sides meeting in the final for the second year in a row, but it was the men from Teesside that would win 9-8 over two legs this time.

That disappointment proved to be the spark for an improvement the following season, and saw several former National League players join the team, such as Jack Brammer, formerly of Sheffield Steeldogs. Hawks dominated the league, winning 29 of their opening 31 games, including a run of 15 wins in a row, eventually securing the title with a 3-1 win away at Leeds Knights 2 on February 14th 2026. More than 1,600 fans attended the home game against Deeside the following evening, after which the league trophy was officially presented. It was the Hawks' first league title in ten years, and came one day shy of the 11th anniversary of securing their first ever title win in 2014/15.

Blackburn will complete in the upcoming 2026 Playoffs, hoping to reach their third Playoff weekend in as many years.

== Club roster 2025-26 ==
(*) Denotes a Non-British Trained player (Import)

Netminders
| No. | Nat. | Player | Date of birth | Place of birth |
|---|---|---|---|---|
| 32 | (England) | Harrison Walker | 2002 | Bradford, England |
| 33 | (Latvia) | Niks Trapans | 1997 | Riga, Latvia |
| 31 | | Jacob Midgley | 2008 | Unknown |

Defencemen
| No. | Nat. | Player | Date of birth | Place of birth |
|---|---|---|---|---|
| 7 | (England) | Thomas Barry | 1997 | Sheffield, England |
| 9 | (England) | Matthew Cross | 2005 | England |
| 48 | (England) | Cade King | 1995 | Heald Green |
| 70 | (England) | Lee Pollitt | 1995 | Salford |
| 80 | (England) | Bobby Streetley | 1994 | Leeds |
| 4 | (England) | Sam Zajac | 1989 | Whitley Bay |

Forwards
| No. | Nat. | Player | Date of birth | Place of birth |
|---|---|---|---|---|
| 88 | (England) | Adam Barnes | 199Captain9 | Manchester |
| 11 | (England) | Luke Watson | 1995 | England |
| 71 | (England) | Jack Brammer | 2003 | Sheffield |
| 37 | (United States) | Dylan Hullaby | 2001 | Columbia |
| 20 | (England) | Jacob Lutwyche | 2001 | Whalley |
| 12 | (Czech Republic) | Jakub Hajek | 1989 | Czech Republic |
| 91 | (England) | Andrew McKinney | 1991 | Hamilton |
| 28 | (England) | James Riddoch | 1995 | Blackburn |
| 66 | (England) | James Royds | 1999 | England |
| 43 | (England) | Charlie Thompson | 1996 | Rotherham |
| 98 | (England) | Sam Warnock | 1998 | Billingham |
| 90 | (England) | Liam Charnock | 1995 | Oldham |

Team Staff
| No. | Nat. | Name | Acquired | Role | Place of birth | Joined from |
|---|---|---|---|---|---|---|
| | (United States) (United Kingdom) | Dominic Osman | 2022/23 | Head coach | Dearborn, MI, USA | Hull Pirates, EPIHL |
| | (England) | Steve Hirst | 2022/23 | Assistant coach | England | Blackburn U16, England U16 2 |
| | (England) | Oliver Lomax | 2020/21 | Assistant coach | Blackburn, England |
| | (England) | Darren Wilson | 2022/23 | Assistant Coach | Blackburn, England | Blackburn Hawks Academy |
| | (England) | Scott Jenkinson | 2022/23 | General Manager | England |
| | (England) | Graham Hamilton | 2025/26 | Equipment Manager | England |
| | (England) | Graham Lomax | 2020/21 | Franchise Owner | England |

== Colours and origin ==
The club initially adopted colors resembling those of the Chicago Blackhawks, featuring red, white, and black, reflecting the similarity in name. However, upon Steve Moria's arrival in 1992, the colors were changed to teal, grey, black, and white, resembling the scheme of the San Jose Sharks. This change coincided with the renaming of the team. In 1994, after Moria's departure, the club transitioned to a scheme of red, white, and gold, which remains in use today. The current Hawks logo was crafted during the Bobby Haigh era by Pete Sheffield.

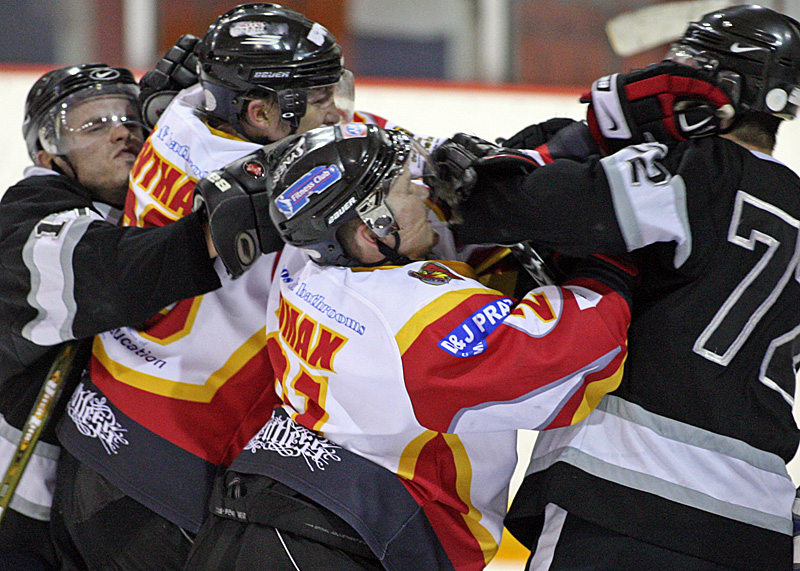
Players from the Blackburn Hawks and Flintshire Freeze ice hockey teams fight during an English National Ice Hockey League game

== The arena and fan base ==
Blackburn Arena accommodates 3,200 spectators seated on each side of the ice, with standing room available on the balcony behind the goal. The rink measures 60 by 30 meters (197 by 98 ft).

Home matches typically draw an average attendance of approximately 700 to 800 spectators.

The Blackburn Hawks Supporters Club, formed through the merger of the Mohawks and HawksF5, arranges regular events for fans. HawksF5, initially established as an independent fan initiative, has expanded fan engagement through various media outlets, including internet radio coverage, player interviews, and podcasts.

== Rivalries ==
The club historically held a significant rivalry with the Trafford Metros, who would later be known as the Manchester Minotaurs, stemming from the close proximity of Blackburn Arena to the former Altrincham Ice Rink in Broadheath, Greater Manchester. The original Hawks roster included players from Altrincham, intensifying the rivalry both on and off the ice. This rivalry ended when the Minotaurs folded at the end of the 2013/14 season.

More recently, rivalries with the Widnes Wild and Deeside Dragons have emerged following their respective promotions to the Moralee League.

In recent years, the Blackburn Hawks have developed ongoing rivalries with the Whitley Warriors and the Billingham Stars. The rivalry with the Billingham Stars intensified notably during the span of three Playoff finals in four years, from 2011 to 2015, with the exception of 2014. The two teams again met in back to back playoff finals in 2024 and 2025, sharing the spoils with a victory each.

During the mid-2010s, the Solway Sharks emerged as formidable opponents for the Blackburn Hawks. The Sharks clinched the league title in six out of the eleven seasons they competed in the Moralee League. Their dominance often disrupted the Hawks' unbeaten streaks, with notable victories including the 2013/14 Playoff Final, won by Solway on their home ice. Blackburn secured their first win in Dumfries in October 2014, rallying from a 3–0 deficit to win 6–4. Despite occasional victories, the Hawks frequently faced challenges against the Sharks until Solway exited the Moralee League in 2023.

In the early 2020s, Nottingham Lions emerged as a rival of the Hawks following a series of intense matches, some of which were marred by fights. One particularly contentious brawl led to multiple players receiving bans of over two years. The rivalry has died down a bit in recent years, helped by the Hawks regularly getting the better of their East Midlands rivals.

== Season-by-season record ==
Note: GP = Games played, W = Wins, L = Losses, T = Ties, Pts = Points, GF = Goals for, GA = Goals against.

| Season | League | Tier | GP | W | L | T | Pts | GF | GA | Finish | Playoffs/post-season |
|---|---|---|---|---|---|---|---|---|---|---|---|
| 1990/91 | British Division 2 | 3 | 28 | 13 | 14 | 1 | 27 | 227 | 244 | 4th of 8 | Failed to qualify |
| 1991/92 | British Division 1 | 2 | 36 | 6 | 30 | 0 | 12 | 235 | 433 | 9th of 10 | No playoffs |
| 1992/93 | British Division 2 | 3 | 32 | 18 | 13 | 1 | 37 | 325 | 204 | 9th of 12 | Failed to qualify |
| 1993/94 | British Division 1 | 2 | 44 | 24 | 14 | 6 | 54 | 373 | 284 | 3rd of 8 | 2nd in Premier Division promotion group |
| 1994/95 | British Division 1 | 2 | 44 | 17 | 23 | 4 | 38 | 341 | 357 | 9th of 12 | No playoffs |
| 1995/96 | British Division 1 | 2 | 52 | 37 | 13 | 2 | 76 | 440 | 278 | 2nd of 14 | Lost promotion placement game |
| 1996/97 | Northern Premier League | 2 | 36 | 15 | 20 | 1 | 31 | 207 | 240 | 4th of 7 | 4th of 4 in second-round group |
| 1997/98 | British National League | 2 | 16 | 1 | 15 | 0 | 2 | 64 | 129 | 8th of 9 | 4th of 5 in group B |
| 1998/99 | EIHL Premier Division | 3 | 32 | 19 | 11 | 2 | 40 | 220 | 206 | 3rd of 9 | Withdrew |
| 1999/00 | EIHL Division 1 (North) | 4 | 18 | 7 | 9 | 2 | 16 | 100 | 98 | 8th of 10 | Failed to qualify |
| 2000/01 | ENIHL (North) | 4 | 16 | 9 | 4 | 3 | 21 | 121 | 69 | 4th of 9 | (North/South) 3rd of 4 in North group |
| 2001/02 | ENIHL (North) | 4 | 18 | 9 | 7 | 2 | 20 | 112 | 81 | 4th of 10 | Failed to qualify |
| 2002/03 | ENIHL (North) | 4 | 18 | 10 | 8 | 0 | 20 | 119 | 81 | 5th of 10 | Failed to qualify |
| 2003/04 | ENIHL (North) | 4 | 18 | 11 | 6 | 1 | 23 | 120 | 71 | 4th of 10 | (North/South) 2nd of 4 in North group |
| 2004/05 | ENIHL (North) | 4 | 16 | 9 | 5 | 2 | 20 | 110 | 62 | 3rd of 9 | (North/South) 3rd of 4 in North group |
| 2005/06 | ENIHL (North) | 3 | 14 | 9 | 4 | 1 | 19 | 82 | 42 | 3rd of 8 | (North/South) 2nd of 4 in North group |
| 2006/07 | ENIHL (North) | 3 | 18 | 9 | 7 | 2 | 20 | 108 | 81 | 5th of 10 | Failed to qualify |
| 2007/08 | ENIHL (North) | 3 | 22 | 12 | 7 | 3 | 27 | 110 | 66 | 6th of 12 | Failed to qualify |
| 2008/09 | ENIHL (North 1) | 3 | 28 | 7 | 19 | 2 | 16 | 71 | 101 | 7th of 8 | Failed to qualify |
| 2009/10 | ENIHL (North 1) | 3 | 28 | 12 | 15 | 1 | 25 | 116 | 101 | 5th of 8 | Failed to qualify |
| 2010/11 | ENIHL (North 1) | 3 | 28 | 11 | 12 | 5 | 27 | 96 | 92 | 4th of 8 | (North) semi-finals |
| 2011/12 | ENIHL (North 1) | 3 | 32 | 20 | 11 | 1 | 41 | 133 | 87 | 3rd of 9 | (North) runners-up |
| 2012/13 | NIHL (North 1) | 3 | 31 | 16 | 11 | 4 | 36 | 123 | 110 | 4th of 9 | (North) champions |
| 2013/14 | NIHL (North 1) | 3 | 28 | 16 | 8 | 4 | 36 | 138 | 67 | 2nd of 8 | (North) runners-up |
| 2014/15 | NIHL (North 1) | 3 | 24 | 21 | 0 | 3 | 45 | 155 | 44 | 1st of 7 | (North) champions |
| 2015/16 | NIHL (North 1) | 3 | 32 | 26 | 3 | 3 | 55 | 221 | 68 | 1st of 9 | (North) champions |
| 2016/17 | NIHL (North 1) | 3 | 28 | 12 | 14 | 2 | 26 | 108 | 125 | 3rd of 8 | Semi Final Loss |
| 2017/18 | NIHL (North 1) | 3 | 36 | 16 | 20 | 0 | 33 | 142 | 145 | 7th of 10 | Quarter Final Loss |
| 2018/19 | NIHL (North 1) | 3 | 36 | 14 | 22 | 0 | 28 | 138 | 204 | 7th of 10 | Quarter Final Loss |
| 2019/20 | NIHL (North 1) | 3 | 24 | 7 | 17 | 0 | 15 | 98 | 149 | 6th of 7 | Playoffs Cancelled Due to Covid |
| 2019/20 | NIHL (North 1) | 3 | 0 | 0 | 0 | 0 | 0 | 0 | 0 | N/A | Season Cancelled Due to Covid |
| 2021/22 | NIHL (North 1) | 3 | 28 | 9 | 19 | 0 | 18 | 127 | 205 | 7th of 8 | Quarter Final Loss |
| 2022/23 | NIHL (North 1) | 3 | 32 | 12 | 20 | 0 | 26 | 111 | 146 | 7th of 9 | Quarter Final Loss |
| 2023/24 | NIHL (North 1) | 3 | 32 | 22 | 10 | 0 | 44 | 162 | 100 | 3rd of 9 | (North) champions |
| 2024/25 | NIHL (North 1) | 3 | 36 | 29 | 6 | 1 | 89 | 242 | 104 | 2nd of 10 | (North) Runners Up |
| 2025/26 | NIHL (North 1) | 3 | 36 | | | | | | | 1st of 10 - Season still being played | Qualified - Playoffs yet to be played |

== Honoured members ==
- 1994/95, Darren Durdle, Paul Hannant British League Division One All Star
- 1995/96, Steve Chartrand, British League Division One All Star
- 1995/96, Ryan Kummu, British League Division One All Star
- Ollie Lomax, Play Off Champion 2012–2013, 2014-2015 & 2015–2016, League Champion 2014-2015 & 2015–2016. Blackburn Hawks all-time longest serving player

=== Head coaches ===
- 1990–91 Pete Murray
- 1991–92 Doug McKay
- 1992–94 Steve Moria
- 1994–95 Mark Stokes & Rocky Saganiuk
- 1995–96 Ryan Kummu
- 1996–98 Jim Pennycook
- 1998–07 Bobby Haig
- 2007–08 Ian McDade (Hough) & John Dunford
- 2008–09 Neil Abel & Les Millie
- 2009–15 Jared Owen
- 2015-16 Daniel MacKriel
- 2016-16 Matt Darlow
- 2016-18 Steven Duncombe
- 2018-19 James Neil
- 2022-Present - Dominic Osman

=== Team Captains ===
- 1993–94 Simon Ferry
- 1995–96 John Haig
- 1996–97 Neil Abel
- 1997–98 Neil Abel & Simon Mills
- 1998–99 Simon Mills
- 2002–03 Gordon Whyte
- 2004–06 Neal Haworth
- 2006–08 Michael Brunton
- 2011–16 Chris Arnone
- 2016-18 Ollie Lomax
- 2018-19 Luke Boothroyd
- 2019-20 James Royds
