= Darren Durdle =

Canadian-born British ice hockey player

- Born: August 15, 1963 (age 61); Vancouver, British Columbia, Canada
- Height: 6 ft 3 in (191 cm)
- Weight: 198 lb (90 kg; 14 st 2 lb)
- Position: Defenceman
- Shot: Right
- Played for: Nottingham Panthers; Peterborough Pirates; Bracknell Bees; Blackburn Hawks; Durham Wasps; Eisbären Berlin; Cardiff Devils
- National team: Great Britain
- Playing career: 1982–2000

Darren Durdle (born August 15, 1963) is a Canadian-born retired professional ice hockey player. Durdle was born in Gimli, Manitoba and also holds British citizenship.

Durdle began his career playing in Canada's major junior Western Hockey League's 1982–83 season. During that season he played for each of the Lethbridge Broncos and the Prince Albert Raiders. During the summer of 1985, Durdle received a scholarship for Brandon University. As a result, he played for the Canadian interuniversity ice hockey team the Brandon Bobcats. Durdle played there throughout the 1985–86, 1986–87, and 1987–88 seasons.

After completing his studies, Durdle moved to the United Kingdom, where he played for the Nottingham Panthers during the British Premier Division's 1988–89 season. Durdle spent eight seasons playing for various British ice hockey teams until he signed for Eisbären Berlin. Following three season in Germany, Durdle returned to the UK, where he played for the Great British ice hockey team, and then for the Welsh team the Cardiff Devils.

== Nationality ==
Durdle received British citizenship whilst playing in the United Kingdom. He played for the Great British ice hockey team during the 1995–95, 1997–98, 1998–99, and 1999–2000 seasons.

== Achievements ==
Durdle was named as Nottingham Panther's first team all-star for the 1988–89 season. Durdle was a member of the British Premier Division's all-star team during the 1990–91 and 1991–92 seasons. He was also part of the World Championship's Pool B all-star team during the 1998–99 season.
