= Planet Ice Blackburn =

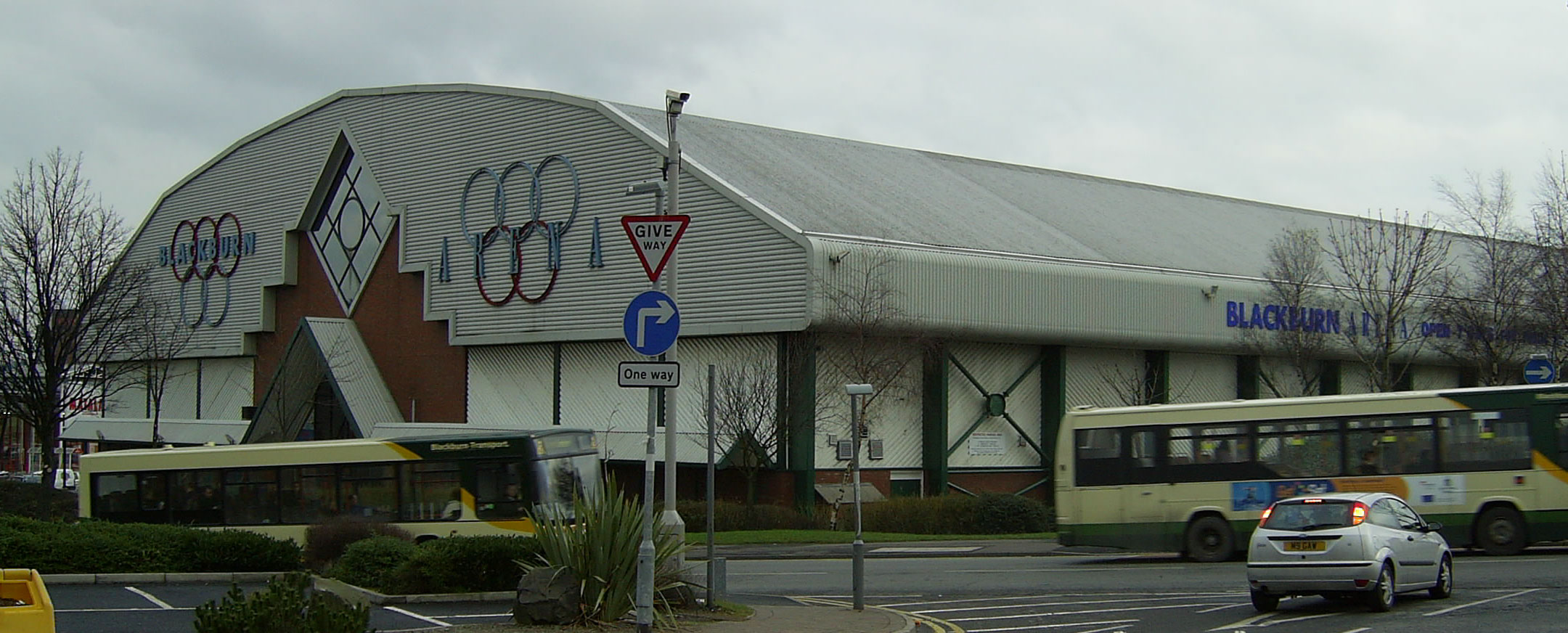

- Location in Blackburn Town Centre
- Location: Blackburn, Lancashire, England
- Coordinates: 53°44′34″N 2°28′50″W
- Operator: Planet Ice
- Capacity: 3,200
- Type: Ice Arena
- Field size: 60 × 30 m (197 × 98 ft)

Construction
- Groundbreaking: 1989
- Opened: 1991
- Renovated: 2005

Tenants
- Blackburn Hawks Blackburn Eagles Lancashire Raptors: 1991– 2012– 2007–2012

Website
- www.blackburnicearena.co.uk

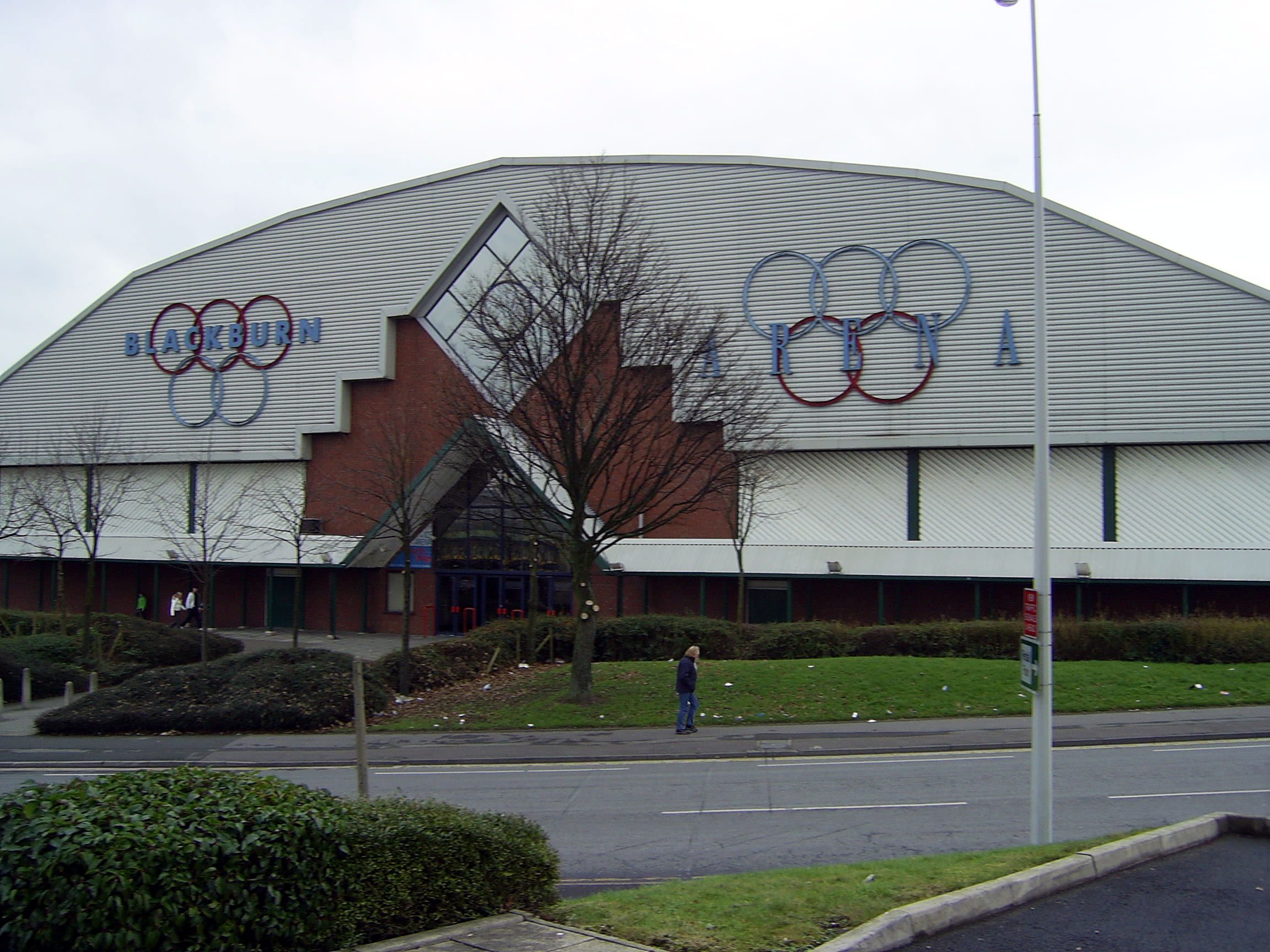
The arena can seat over 3,000 people. (January 2006)

Planet Ice Blackburn (formerly known as Blackburn Arena) is an Olympic-size ice arena operated by Planet Ice in Blackburn, England. It is the home of Blackburn Hawks and Blackburn Eagles ice hockey clubs. The arena, which was opened in April 1991 by Christopher Dean and Jayne Torvill, holds 3,200 people and has an ice pad of 60 by 30 metres (197 by 98 ft). The arena was built to coincide with Manchester’s 1996 Summer Olympic bid, with the possibility of boxing contests being held there. It was refurbished in 2005. It is currently operated by Planet Ice.

The arena was originally owned by Blackburn Council before being sold to the Peel Group. It was subsequently sold to the Silver Blades in December 2015.

WCW (World Championship Wrestling) held a tour event at the arena in October 1993, as did the WWF (World Wrestling Federation) the following year, and rock band Status Quo held the only concert to date there in November 1994 as part of their Thirsty Work world tour.

An independent junior development scheme for ice hockey is based at the arena, with teams for under 10s, under 12s, under 14s, under 16s and under 18s. These teams all go under the name of Lancashire Lightning Ice Hockey Academy, which changed its name from Blackburn Hawks Academy after a dissociation from the professional men's team, Blackburn Hawks.

The arena is open seven days a week for public ice skating sessions, and includes a café and ice hockey.
