= Bobby Haig =

British ice hockey player and coach

- Born: 12 October 1969 (age 57) Kirkcaldy, Scotland
- Position: Forward
- Shoots: Right
- Played for: Fife Flyers; Dundee Tigers; Tayside Tigers; Humberside Seahawks; Dumfries Vikings; Paisley Pirates; Blackburn Hawks
- National team: Great Britain
- Playing career: 1984–present

Robert Haig (born 12 October 1969) is a British professional ice hockey player, and head coach. Haig has had a long career both at club and international level.

== International level ==
Haig played for the Great Britain Junior squad from the 1986–87 season through to the 1988–89 season.

== Coaching career ==
Haig was head coach of the Blackburn Hawks senior ice hockey team from 1998 until 2007. He was also the assistant coach to Mark Johnson who was the head coach of the Blackburn Thunderhawks, an EIHA under-19s ice hockey team which won the B-league playoffs in the 1997–98 season to gain promotion to the Northern A-league.

== Medals ==
Haig won the Heineken League Division One title with the Fife Flyers in the 1991–92 season. He also won the Heineken League Division One Play-Offs with the same team that season.
