= Deeside Dragons =

- City: Queensferry
- League: NIHL
- Conference: Division 1 North
- Founded: 2012; 14 years ago
- Operated: 2012 - present
- Home arena: Deeside Leisure Centre
- Colors: Red, Green & Black
- General manager: (England) Shaun Bebbington
- Head coach: Mike Clancy
- Captain: (Wales) James Parsons
- Media: Jakob Forster
- Website: https://dragonsihc.com/
Home colours	Away colours	Third colours

Championships
- Conference titles: 1 (2015/16)
- Playoff championships: 1 (2015/16)

The Deeside Dragons (known for sponsorship reasons as the Steel 4 Structures Dragons) are a Welsh ice hockey team that play in the National Ice Hockey League, north division. They play their games at Deeside Leisure Centre, Flintshire, and replaced the previous team Flintshire Freeze. They won the North League championship in the 2015/16 season, with a record of 24-3-1 as well as the 2015/16 Laidler Playoffs. From the 2022/23 season the club had Aspray Chester as the clubs title sponsor. This changed for the 2025/26 season to Steel 4 Structures.

The 2022/23 season sees the return of ice hockey to North Wales for the first time in over 2 years, due to the ice rink being used as a field hospital and later a vaccination centre for North East Wales.

In July 2015 it was reported that the Dragons had been bought by Red Hockey Limited, a British Company who own the Telford Tigers English Premier League Ice Hockey team as well as having stakes in Manchester Phoenix and Bracknell Bees.

In 2015/16, the team won the league, gaining promotion to NIHL North 1 (Moralee). During the season there were issues between the owners of the Deeside Dragons and Flintshire County Council which resulted in the ownership of the Dragons being removed from Red Hockey. Despite prior fears with the ownership of the Deeside Dragons logo these have been quelled with a rebranded logo. On the final home game of the 2015/16 season the Dragons were involved in an incident which saw their opponents Widnes Wild walk off the ice in the second period and refuse to continue the game. Dragons player Alex Roberts received a three-game ban as a result of this incident.

In July 2016 it was announced that Scott McKenzie had left the Widnes Wild to join the Dragons as player-coach. He left the following year.

At the end of the 2017/18 season the Dragons were relegated to the North Division 2 league.

== Season-by-season record ==
Season	Position	Wins	Draws	Losses	±
2012-13	2	17	1	6	88
2013-14	2	18	2	8	61
2014-15	5	15	2	17	31
2015-16	1	24	3	1	132
2017-18 (NIHL1)	10	2	0	32	-347
2018-19	7	9	2	21	-43
2019-20	6	12	0	15	2

== Club roster 2022-23 ==
(*) Denotes a Non-British Trained player (Import)

Netminders
No.	Nat.	Player	Catches	Date of birth	Place of birth	Acquired	Contract
30	(England)	Philip Pearson	L	5 August 1987 (age 38)	Stockport, England	2022 from Bradford Bulldogs	22/23
37	(England)	Michael Rogers	L	17 August 1997 (age 28)	Warrington, England	2022 from Blackburn Hawks	22/23

Defencemen
No.	Nat.	Player	Shoots	Date of birth	Place of birth	Acquired	Contract
11	(Wales)	Billy Perks		2001 (age 21)	Wales	2022	22/23
13	(England)	Matthew Wainwright	L	19 November 1993 (age 32)	Chester, England	2022 from Blackburn Hawks	22/23
14	(England)	Reece Cairney-Witter	L	14 February 1995 (age 31)	Bradford, England	2022 from Blackburn Hawks	22/23
15	(England)	Lewis Otley	R	30 July 1999 (age 26)	Sheffield, England	2022 from Malungs IF	22/23
19	(England)	Joshua Richardson	R	1998 (age 24)	Chorley, England	2022 from Bradford Bulldogs	22/23
21	(England)	Micheal Jones	R	4 September 1981 (age 44)	England	2022	22/23
55	(Wales)	Ross Kennedy	R	30 January 1998 (age 28)	St Asaph, Wales	2022 from Leeds Knights	22/23
91	(England)	Marc Lovell	L	2 June 1982 (age 43)	Chester, England	2012 from Flintshire Freeze	22/23

Forwards
No.	Nat.	Player	Shoots	Date of birth	Place of birth	Acquired	Contract
4	(England)	Charlie Spridgeon		2001 (age 21)	England	2022 from Telford Tigers 2	22/23
5	(Wales)	James Parsons 'C'	L	22 September 1987 (age 38)	St Asaph, Wales	2022 from Blackburn Hawks	22/23
7	(England)	Alex Parry		1 July 1992 (age 33)	England	2022 from Altrincham Aces	22/23
9	(England)	Gary Dixon	R	8 June 1986 (age 39)	Liverpool, England	2022 from Blackburn Hawks	22/23
22	(Wales)	Karl Bacon			Wales	2022 from Blackburn Hawks	22/23
23	(England)	Simon Furnival	R	11 August 1984 (age 41)	Warrington, England	2022	22/23
29	(England) (Canada)	Andy McKinney	R	13 April 1991 (age 35)	Hamilton, ON, Canada	2022 from Telford Tigers	22/23
33	(England)	M.J. Clancy	L	17 June 2000 (age 25)	Chester, England	2022 from Blackburn Hawks	22/23
61	(England)	Jared Dickinson	R	17 September 1994 (age 31)	Salford, England	2022 from Blackburn Hawks	22/23
72	(England)	Chris Jones	R	25 May 1988 (age 37)	Ely, England	2022	22/23
79	(Czech Republic)	Petr Valusiak*	L	7 September 1986 (age 39)	Ostrava, Czechia	2022 from Blackburn Hawks	22/23
88	(England)	Christopher Keating		1988 (age 34)	England	2022 from Altrincham Aces	22/23

Team Staff
No.	Nat.	Name	Acquired	Role	Place of birth	Joined From
	(England)	Michael Clancy	2022/23	Head coach	Chester, England	Blackburn Hawks, NIHL 1
	(England)	Matt Compton	2018/19	Assistant coach	Chester, England
	(England)	David Clancy	2022/23	Goaltending Coach	Rinteln, Germany	Blackburn Hawks, NIHL 1
	(England)	Bruce Morton	2014/15	General Manager	England
91	(England)	Marc Lovell	2016/17	Player-Assistant Coach	Chester, England
	(Wales)	Charles Humphreys	2022/23	Equipment Manager	Wales	Blackburn Hawks, NIHL 1

== 2021/22 Outgoing ==
Outgoing
No.	Nat.	Player	Shoots	Date of birth	Place of birth	Leaving For
