= Manchester Minotaurs =

Ice hockey team from Manchester, England

- Founded: 2007
- League: English National Ice Hockey League North, Moralee Conference
- Team history: Manchester Phoenix ENL 2007-2009; Trafford Metros 2009–2013; Manchester Minotaurs 2013-
- Based in: Altrincham, England
- Arena: Altrincham Ice Dome
- Colours: White, Red, Black & Purple
- Head coach: Paul Bayliss
- Manager: Ian Rogerson

The Manchester Minotaurs were an ice hockey team currently playing in the English National Ice Hockey League North, Division 1. They were previously known as the Manchester Phoenix ENL (2007–2009), and the Trafford Metros (2009–2013).

== History ==
=== The Beginning ===
When the construction of the Altrincham Ice Dome was first announced, a small, but vocal number of fans expressed a desire to see the Altrincham Aces team be restarted at the rink. Manchester Phoenix were initially unable (or unwilling) to do so, as they wished to focus their energies on starting the senior EIHL side, and the hastily announced juniors. They did, however express the idea that if a third party wished to come forward and run an English National Ice Hockey League (ENL) side from the rink, then they would be only too happy to assist in any way they could (citation to follow). Rumours of an ENL team increased upon the conclusion of the 2006/2007 season when the English Ice Hockey Association made moves to the junior age boundaries at the top level from under 19 to under 18; leaving a number of promising players without a team to play for.

The dream became reality in the summer of 2007 when it was announced by the Phoenix that they had formed an ENL affiliate to begin play in time for the 2007/2008 season under the name "Manchester Phoenix ENL". The creation of the ENL team was seen as being the final step for an integrated development system, taking players from under 10 level right through the junior system, onwards to the ENL and finally to the professional side.

=== 2007-2008 ===
Manchester Phoenix ENL began their first season of play in the ENL North in September 2007. Several members on the roster had signed from nearby Flintshire Freeze, with the squad consisting of many former Altrincham Aces players who could now resume playing for a team more local to the Manchester area. The season concluded with the team going 6–15–1, claiming 9th place in the 12 team league.

=== 2008-2009 ===
Due to several new teams being formed, the league was split into 2 divisions for the beginning of the 2008/09 season. With Phoenix ENL failing to finish their inaugural season in the top half of the table, they joined the likes of Grimsby, Telford & Bradford in the newly formed ENL North Division 2. The team had great success in their second season of existence under head coach Mark Hobson, finishing the season with a 20-4-0 record, missing out on the league title by just three points. However, after finishing the regular season in 2nd place, success was to come in the post-season with victory in the promotion playoffs, granting the team promotion to the ENL's top tier for the 2009/10 season.

=== Return of the Metros ===
On 12 August 2009, the team was renamed the Trafford Metros, to help differentiate between the EPL Phoenix, and their ENL affiliate. This has meant that the club now have their own jerseys, as opposed to sharing a design with the parent team which has been the case since their conception.

=== Re-Branded again ===
In August 2013, it was revealed that the team name would be changing once more, this time to the 'Manchester Minotaurs'.

Head coach

- Paul 'Nipper' Bayliss
