= Slough Jets =

Ice hockey team in Berkshire, England

- City: Slough, Berkshire
- League: NIHL
- Conference: Division One South
- Founded: 1986
- Home arena: The Hangar - Slough Ice Arena
- Colors: Blue, Red & White
- General manager: Matthew Parsons (England)
- Head coach: Lukas Smital (Czech Republic)
- Website: Slough Jets

Franchise history
- 1986 – Present: Slough Jets

The Slough Jets are an ice hockey team from Slough, Berkshire, England playing in the NIHL South Division 1. The team was founded in 1986 after the construction of the Slough Ice Arena in Montem Lane in Slough and joined the first division of the British League.

The Slough Jets are one of the few UK clubs who have played from their foundation to the present, without an interruption or name change.

== History ==
=== The British Hockey League (1986-1996) ===
The Slough Jets were formed with the help of Gary Stefan who had previously played for Streatham Redskins.

It did not take long for Slough Jets to make their mark, winning the London Cup in 1989 . They followed this up by winning the Southern Cup and the British League Division One the following season, but they lost the final of the promotion play-off and so did not move up to the Premier Division.

The Jets were runners-up in Division One for three of the next four seasons, before winning the Division and the promotion play-off in 1995, thus moving up to the Premier Division.

=== The British National League (1996-2002) ===
After a brief settling-in period in the new league structure, the Jets won more silverware in 1998, capturing the Benson & Hedges Plate, and also finishing second in the BNL Southern Premier League the same year. The following season, 1998–99, was the most successful in the club's history to that point, as they won the British National League for the first time. They were also runners-up in the British National League Play-offs, losing to Fife Flyers on penalties.

The club were beaten finalists in the Benson & Hedges Plate in 2000, and this was also the year that one of their greatest players, Gary Stefan, was elected to the Great Britain Hall of Fame. The next few years were to be a fallow spell for the club, who were actually disbanded in 2002 due to financial problems, but were re-formed the same year.

=== The English Premier Ice Hockey League (2002-2014) ===
In 2002 Teal & White Ltd took over the management of the Slough Jets. In their first EPIHL season the Jets finished 3rd and qualified for the play-offs. In the following year they made the Final of the play-offs.

There was another change of ownership in 2005 as Slapshot Ltd took over the running of the club.

Jets took runner up in the league in 2005–06, 2007–08 and 2009–10 but never made it to league champions. They were successful in the post season play-offs, winning the titles in the 2007–08, 2009–10 and 2011–12 seasons. They also claimed the Premier Cup in 2011.

The final EPIHL season ended with the Jets struggling financially and coach Craig Moran having to hold together a team after Head coach Slava Koulikov left part way through the season along with other players. The Jets finished bottom of the 10 team league and failed to make the play-offs.

=== End of the Professional Era ===
In 2014 the Slough Jets ceased professional competition following a decision by Slapshot Ltd to exit the English Premier Ice Hockey League (EPIHL) which was the 2nd tier of British Ice hockey at the time. The Slough Jets name continued with its existing amateur senior team in the National Ice Hockey League South 2 division and the Junior club. It was alleged that some supporters saw the move by the owners to end the professional era to effectively be the end of the club they supported. A move was made by Gary Stefan and Jets media man Mark Denholm to create a new EPIHL team at the rink but attempts to secure ice time were not successful.

A Slough Jets legends match was set up and played on July 14, 2014, to honour the club's professional history and raise money for charity.

=== The National Ice Hockey League (2014-Present) ===
Slough Jets currently play in the National Ice Hockey League (NIHL) South 1 Britton Division, which is the third tier of UK hockey. After winning NIHL2 league and National honours in the 2018/19 season, Slough Jets senior team moved to a 10 team NIHL1 division for 2019/20 season in a revised English Ice hockey league structure which introduced a new second-tier league called the NIHL National hockey league.

The Slough Jets ENL side had already been formed in 2010 to replace the disbanded Slough Harrier Hawks side and provide a bridge for young players to move from junior hockey to senior hockey. Craig Moran initially took on the Head coach role before resuming his Assistant Manager role for the EPIHL side. When professional hockey ceased in Slough, the Slough Jets NIHL side became the top level of Senior men's hockey at the venue. The coach for the amateur side for the 2014/15 season was Tony Milton.

The 2014/15 season was a success as they stormed to the title losing just one match in regular season play from their 6 team league. Franchise owner and player Zoran Kosic leading the points scoring with 48 points and notable performances from Alan Green and exciting Slough U18 pair Ben and Josh Ealey-Newman. Jets lost in the final of the playoffs however 4–0 to the Bristol Pitbulls.

Ahead of the 2015/16 season, departures affected the side with Zoran Kosic leaving and Alan Green and the Ealey-Newman brothers headed to Oxford. Nathan Darmanin was the top points scorer with 18 points as Jets only won 4 of 19 matches, finished 5 in their 6 team league and didn't make the play-offs.

With the closure of the rink for refurbishment, the team training in Guildford and Bracknell ice rinks and some fixture cancellations, the team struggled throughout the 2016/17 season. Player injuries and fixture congestion due to lack of ice whilst a temporary rink was constructed meant they could only finish bottom of the league with 4 victories to their name. Top points scorer again was Nathan Darmanin with 25 points.

Ahead of the 2017/18 season, it was announced that the former Bracknell Bees and Guildford Flames forward Lukas Smital was joining Slough Jets as player-coach to replace the departing Tony Milton. Smital took on a side who had struggled the previous season and finished bottom of their league of 6 teams. He was joined by former Bee and Slough player Joe Ciccarello as his assistant. Backstopped by impressive veteran Netminder Chris Douglas and with a mix of youth and experienced players, Slough finished a creditable 7th out of 13 teams in an expanded league structure achieving unexpected results against strong Chelmsford, Peterborough and Bracknell sides as Jets turned their temporary rink into a very difficult place to go and get a result.

Lukas Smital himself was top points scorer for the Jets with 67. Chris Douglas and Lukas Smital made the NIHL2 South first All-Star team. Luke Reynolds who joined the club part way through the season from Milton Keynes Thunder made the NIHL2 South second All-Star team

Following their return to the 'Hangar' in the 18/18 season, the team showed good form and produced a series of victories to lead the league. Wins against the Solent Devils home and away being the decisive results. Jets were tied on points with Solent Devils after victory against Peterborough Phantoms 2 in the final match of the season but were awarded the league title due to the head-to-head results.

After achieving the NIHL2 South title, the Slough Jets went to Coventry Skydome to play the NIHL2 North champions Widnes Wild for the NIHL2 National title . Man of the Match Sean Norris did the damage as Slough Jets came out victors 7-1

The play-offs were less successful as the Slough Jets went out with a heavy 9–3 defeat in the semi-finals to eventual champions Chelmsford Chieftains in a match which was missing influential player-coach Lukas Smital.

Top points scorer for the Jets during the season was Lukas Smital with 84 points. Lukas Smital again made the NIHL2 South first All-Star team. Sean Norris and Sam Talbot made the NIHL2 South second All-Star team

Jets re-signed Lukas Smital and the core of the NIHL2 South title winning side including Matt Smital in net, Lindgren, Reynolds, Rose, Talbot and Norris for the 2019/20 season. In defence the experienced Matt Jordan came in from Bracknell. Lukas Smital announced his retirement from playing at the age of 44. The club also moved to the NIHL 1 South Britton division.

The Jets made a strong start to their life in NIHL1 by leading the division at the end of the first month with Sean Norris winning Player of the Month. They were unable to carry on this form though and a severe concussion injury to key forward Sean Norris against Oxford City Stars on October 13 put him out of the side for several weeks and a further injury against Milton Keynes Thunder upon his brief return saw him sidelined again before he made a decision to leave the club. Norris left the club to join the NIHL National Basingstoke Bison full time and was followed there in mid-January by Sam Talbot further weakening the Jets side. Despite the loss of two key forward players and injuries to others, the emergence of junior players kept the club competitive and a top 4 spot still looked a possibility. By March the Jets still had several games in hand on other sides in the top 4 as the COVID-19 pandemic struck.

After the Elite Ice Hockey League announced it was cancelling the 2019/20 season on March 13 the EIHA made a statement that fixtures for the weekend were expected to continue. Chelmsford Chieftains cancelled the away fixture on March 14 citing players self isolating as well as concerns for player and supporter safety. Slough Jets cancelled their away fixture on March 15 against Bracknell Hornets as it became clear of the risk and concern amongst the players, supporters and their families. The EIHA made a decision to cancel the season the day after on March 16. The EIHA decided to award Bracknell Hornets a 5–0 victory for Slough Jets refusing to travel which moved them above Slough in the table and all other remaining fixtures were marked completed with no points awarded. This resulted in Slough Jets finishing the season 6th in the table.

Despite leaving the Jets mid season, Sam Talbot was voted onto the second NIHL1 South All-Star team.

The 2020/21 regular season was cancelled due to the COVID-19 pandemic however as part of a return to play several clubs played in a couple of round robin mini tournaments. First of all was the South Cup with the following teams involved; Haringey Huskies from NIHL2, Milton Keynes Thunder, Solent Devils and Slough Jets. As fans were not allowed in arenas at the time, the matches were streamed over the internet for fans to watch.

The eventual winners were Solent Devils who tied with Slough Jets on points but won on wins in regulation

The next return to play tournament was the Ruggedstock cup which was contested between Haringey Huskies, Milton Keynes Thunder and eventual champions, the Slough Jets.

An NIHL division 1 Cup final was held in Sheffield at the end of the season with two teams from the South in Slough Jets and Milton Keynes Thunder matching up against Widnes Wild and Sheffield Scimitars. The Jets lost in the semi-finals to Widnes Wild to end their season.

In the 2021/22 season, the Slough Jets fielded a youthful side including many U18 junior players and had an average age of just 20. Despite the lack of experience, the Jets started competitively and were particularly strong in the Cup games. A close 2–1 loss away against eventual league, cup and playoff winners Streatham IHC with seven seconds left showed the promise in the side. Slough Jets were the first away side to beat Bristol Pitbulls in their new rink with a 1–0 victory coming courtesy of a goal by Lewis English and a 61 shot shutout for Brett Shepherd.

A number of Jets players were also involved in matches in the NIHL National league. Adam Rosbottom left the Jets to play for the Bees full time in January at which point he was one of the Slough Jets top point scorers. Further departures shortly after were Thomas Banner to Basingstoke Bison and then Solomon Smith towards the end of the season.

Despite being in the top four spots most of the season, Jets failed to get the points to beat off rivals towards the end of the season eventually finishing 5th. Slough Jets failed to make the final of the cup with a narrow 5–4 loss to Invicta Dynamos in the semi-finals over two legs and also didn't make the play off final weekend with a more comprehensive loss 14–7 to Chelmsford Chieftains in the quarter-final over two legs.

== The 'Hangar' ==
The Slough Jets' home rink is the Slough Ice Arena, which is also known as the "Hangar". A complete renovation of the rink begun in November 2016 with the reopening of the refurbished and remodelled facility in April 2018. Whilst renovations where carried out, the Jets played out of a temporary facility located in the leisure centre car park. In 2020 a NIHL National league team the Bees (formally Bracknell Bees) moved to the rink following the closure of the John Nike Leisuresport ice rink facility in Bracknell. The teams announced a desire to work together for mutual success and to develop players.

== Slough Jets Juniors ==
The Slough Jets have a full junior programme with everything from 'Learn to play' programme to teams in all the junior age groups; under 9s, under-11s, under-13s, under-15s and under-18s. The Jets junior structure is part of the same organisation as the senior team with U18 players being included in senior training and match day squads.

== Famous Jets ==
Future Oscar winner Gareth Unwin, who produced The King's Speech, once played for the team.

== Season-by-season record ==
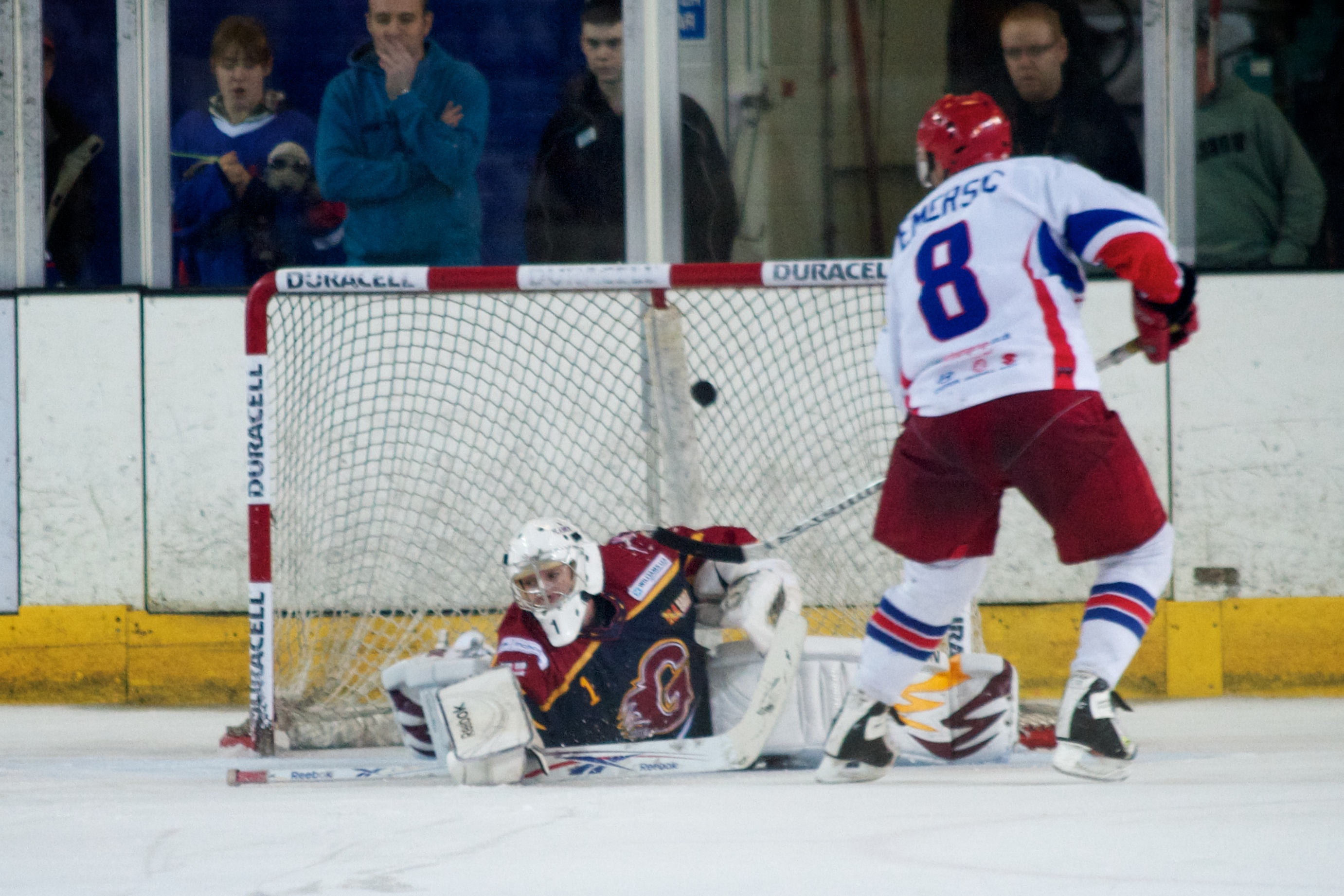
Blaž Emeršič scoring a penalty shot goal for Jets' EPIHL Play-Off Champions title in 2009–10

This is a partial list of the last ten seasons completed by the Jets. For the full season-by-season history, see List of Slough Jets seasons.

Note: GP = Games played, W = Wins, L = Losses, T = Ties, OTL = Overtime Losses, Pts = Points, GF = Goals for, GA = Goals against, PIM = Penalties in minutes, POS = Position in league table at end of season

Note: *2019-20 season cut short due to COVID-19 pandemic. Points awarded or remaining games annulled

Note: **2020-21 season did not run due to COVID-19 pandemic.

Season	League	GP	W	T	OTL	L	GF	GA	PTS	PIM	POS
2010-11	EPIHL	55	41	0	0	14	249	175	83	590	3
2011-12	EPIHL	54	33	0	2	19	228	175	68	-	4
2012-13	EPIHL	54	30	0	2	22	196	184	62	676	5
2013-14	EPIHL	54	17	0	3	34	160	246	37	-	10
2014-15	NIHL2 (SE)	20	19	0	0	1	146	41	38	414	1
2015-16	NIHL2 (SE)	20	4	1	0	15	77	148	9	375	5
2016-17	NIHL2 (SE)	20	4	4	0	12	67	103	12	550	6
2017-18	NIHL2 (S)	26	12	0	0	14	104	153	24	618	7
2018-19	NIHL2 (S)	28	25	0	1	2	204	81	51	475	1
2019-20*	NIHL1 (S)	36	13	3	2	13	131	124	34	429	6
2020-21**	NIHL1 (S)	0	0	0	0	0	0	0	0	0	-
2021-22	NIHL1 (S)	32	18	0	1	13	111	98	37	607	5
2022-23	NIHL1 (S)										

=== Franchise scoring leaders ===
These are the top-ten point-scorers in franchise history. Figures are updated after each completed EPIHL regular season.

Note: Pos = Position; GP = Games played; G = Goals; A = Assists; Pts = Points; P/G = Points per game; * = current Jets player

Points
Player	GP	G	A	Pts	P/G
Gary Stefan	455	562	502	1064	2.39
Joe Stefan	350	369	450	819	2.34
Brian Mason	278	233	444	677	2.44
Scott Rex	163	313	307	620	3.8
Derek Higdon	231	294	317	611	2.65
Richard Boprey	115	273	270	543	4.72
David Heath	482	174	297	471	0.98
Nick Cross	345	154	174	319	0.92
Rob Coutts	230	129	172	301	1.31
Steve Moria	137	109	192	301	2.2

Goals
Player	GP	G
Gary Stefan	455	562
Joe Stefan	350	369
Scott Rex	163	313
Derek Higdon	231	294
Richard Boprey	115	273
Brian Mason	278	233
David Heath	482	174
Nick Cross	345	154
Danny Gratton	87	136
Rob Coutts	230	129

Assists
Player	GP	A
Gary Stefan	455	502
Joe Stefan	350	450
Brian Mason	278	444
Derek Higdon	231	317
Scott Rex	163	307
David Heath	482	297
Richard Boprey	115	270
Steve Moria	137	192
Warren Rost	528	178
Nick Cross	345	174

=== Franchise individual records ===
- Most goals in a season: Derek Higdon, 96 (1993–94)
- Most assists in a season: Brian Mason, 112 (1993–94)
- Most points in a season: Scott Rex, 192 (1993–94)
- Most penalty minutes in a season: Mike Flanagan, 252 (1995–96)
- Most goals in a season, defenceman: Brian Mason, 48 (1993–94)
- Most assists in a season, defenceman: Brian Mason, 74 (1990–91)
- Most points in a season, defenceman: Brian Mason, 160 (1993–94)

== Club roster 2022-23 ==
(*) Denotes a Non-British Trained player (Import)

Netminders
No.	Nat.	Player	Catches	Date of birth	Place of birth	Acquired	Contract
36	(England)	Brett Shepherd	L	17 September 2000 (age 25)	Kingston upon Thames, England	2018 from Streatham IHC	22/23
74	(England)	Brett Massey		2002 (age 20)	England	2021 from Swindon Wildcats 2	22/23

Defencemen
No.	Nat.	Player	Shoots	Date of birth	Place of birth	Acquired	Contract
11	(England)	Luke Dreelan		5 January 1999 (age 27)	England	2015 from Slough U18	22/23
13	(England)	Liam Clark	R	13 April 2002 (age 24)	London, England	2018 from Slough U18	22/23
15	(England)	Tyton Cathcart		2004 (age 18)	England	2021 from Basingstoke U18	22/23
21	(England)	Jacob White-Sey	L	15 May 2005 (age 21)	Surrey, England	2021 from Guildford U18	Two-Way
44	(England)	Jacob Minter	L	24 April 2004 (age 22)	Nottingham, England	2021 from Swindon U18	Two-Way
61	(England)	Hariyan Ross		2004 (age 18)	England	2021 from Slough U18	22/23
67	(England)	Gavin Black		2004 (age 18)	England	2021 from Slough U18	22/23

Forwards
No.	Nat.	Player	Shoots	Date of birth	Place of birth	Acquired	Contract
3	(England)	Dylan Holicka	L	2005 (age 17)	England	2022 from Raiders 2	22/23
9	(England)	Sebastian Mohr	R	2006 (age 16)	England	2022 from Slough U18	22/23
16	(England)	Adam Erskine	R	10 February 2005 (age 21)	England	2022 from Raiders 2	Two-Way
19	(England)	Lewis English	R	3 July 2000 (age 25)	England	2019 from Invicta Dynamos	22/23
23	(Republic of Ireland)	Conor Redmond	R	29 March 1995 (age 31)	Glasgow, Scotland	2021 from Invicta Dynamos	22/23
32	(United Kingdom) (Czech Republic) (United States)	Luke Smital	R	2 November 2003 (age 22)	Johnstown, PA, USA	2021 from Slough U18	22/23
46	(England)	Ross Cowan		9 March 1999 (age 27)	Chelmsford, England	2021 from Invicta Dynamos	22/23
54	(England)	Christian Mohr		31 July 2003 (age 22)	England	2021 from Slough U18	Two-Way
71	(England)	Matthew Corkum		2006 (age 16)	England	2022 from Streatham U18	22/23
75	(England)	Roman Cathcart		2006 (age 16)	England	2022 from Basingstoke U18	Two-Way
90	(England)	Jacob Soper	R	22 December 2002 (age 23)	Oxford, England	2018 from Slough U18	22/23
91	(England)	Oliver Hemmings-Maher		2006 (age 16)	England	2022 from Basingstoke Buffalo	Two-Way
93	(England)	Bradley Hildreth	L	19 November 2001 (age 24)	England	2018 from Okanagan Hockey Academy UK U18	22/23

Team Staff
No.	Nat.	Name	Acquired	Role	Place of birth	Joined from
	(Czech Republic)	Lukas Smital	2017/18	Head coach	Brno, Czechia	Bracknell Bees, EPIHL
	(England)	Luke Reynolds	2018/19	Assistant Coach	London, England
	(England)	Steve English	2014/15	General Manager	England
	(England)	Wayne Box	2017/18	Assistant General Manager	England	Bracknell Bees, EPIHL

== 2021/22 Outgoing ==
Outgoing
No.	Nat.	Player	Shoots	Date of birth	Place of birth	Leaving For
22	(England)	Dan Bradley	R	24 June 2004 (age 22)	Ascot, England	Bristol Pitbulls, NIHL National
24	(England)	Dan Rose	R	16 December 1991 (age 34)	Isleworth, England	Bees IHC, NIHL National
25	(England)	Harry Harcup		17 January 2000 (age 26)	England	Chelmsford Chieftains, NIHL 1
38	(Jamaica) (England)	Solomon Smith		21 January 1998 (age 28)		Streatham Black Hawks, NIHL 2
64	(Argentina) (Spain)	Ian Germanier-Torrado	R	29 November 2004 (age 21)	Argentina	Haringey Huskies, NIHL 2

== Club honours ==
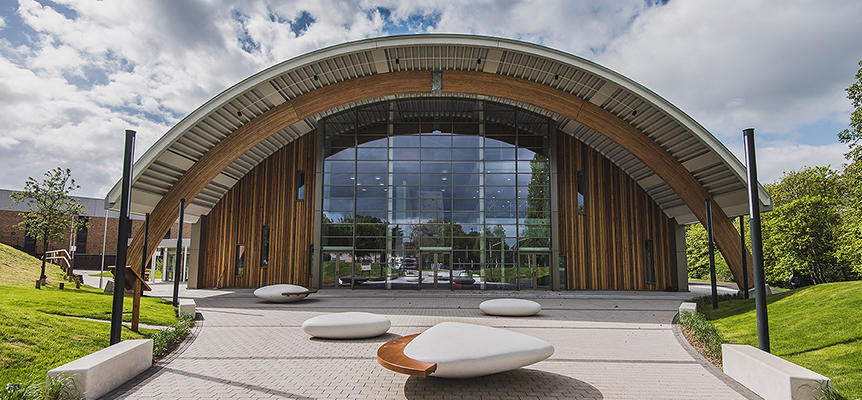
The Slough Ice Arena

- 2020-21
  - Ruggedstock Cup Winners
- 2018-19
  - NIHL 2 - Division Winners 2018-19
  - NIHL 2 - National Champions Winners 2018-19
- 2014–15
  - NIHL 2 - Division Winners 2011–12
- 2010–11
  - English Premier Cup Champions
- 2009–10
  - EPIHL Play-Off Champions
  - English Premier League Runners-up
  - English Premier cup semi-finalists
- 2008–09
  - EPIHL Play-Off Semi-finalists
- 2007–08
  - EPIHL Play-Off Champions
  - English Premier League Runners-up
  - EPIHL Premier Cup Runners-up
- 2005–06 Season
  - English Premier League Runners-up
- 1998–99 Season
  - British National League Champions
- 1997–98 Season
  - Benson & Hedges Plate Winners
- 1994–95 Season
  - British Division 1 Champions
- 1990–91 Season
  - British Division 1 Champions
- 1989–90 Season
  - Heineken League Division One Champions
  - Southern Cup Champions
- 1988–89 Season
  - London Cup Champions

== Retired Shirts ==
- #12 (United States) Retired 1990 Richard Boprey
- #18 (United Kingdom) Retired 1995 Mark Howell
- #31 (United States) Retired 1998 Charlie Colon
- #17 (Canada) Retired 1999 Gary Stefan
- #28 (Canada) Retired 2002 Joe Stefan
- # 4 (United Kingdom) Retired 2008 Warren Rost

== Head coaches ==
- (Czech Republic) Lukas Smital (Current)
- (England) Tony Milton
- (England) Craig Moran
- (Russia) Slava Koulikov
- (Canada) Doug Sheppard
- (Scotland) Peter Russell
- (Canada) Steve Moria
- (Canada) Andy Hannah
- (England) Warren Rost
- (Canada) Joe Stefan
- (Canada) Scott Rex
- (United States) Charlie Colon
- (United States) Richard Boprey
- (United States) Paul Ferguson
- (Canada) Gary Stefan

== See also ==
- Slough
- English Ice Hockey Association
- Slough Jets ENL
- List of Slough Jets seasons
