= NIHL South Division 1 =

British ice hockey league

- Sport: Ice hockey
- Founded: 1996
- No. of teams: 10
- Country: United Kingdom

The NIHL South Division 1 is the top-level league in the Southern Region of the British National Ice Hockey League setup.

It forms one of four NIHL divisions, of a total of 40 teams, which are divided regionally.

The NIHL was reorganised for the start of the 2017-18 season, and South Division 1 features ten teams in 2024/25. The closing of the English Premier League meant that Basingstoke Bison, Swindon Wildcats, Bracknell Bees and Peterborough Phantoms joined the division, as the NIHL came to be the second tier of British ice hockey instead of the third.

The combination of semi-professional teams from the former EPL with largely amateur teams from the old NIHL South Division created pressure, with several teams preferring to play in South Division 2, in the face of increased costs and an unnaturally tougher playing field.

At the end of the season, the top eight sides will play two-legged quarter-finals before the final four sides will contest a play-off weekend, currently held at IceSheffield.

== 2024/25 clubs ==
Team	Town/City	Home Arena
Cardiff Fire	Cardiff	Viola Arena
Chelmsford Chieftains	Chelmsford	Riverside Ice & Leisure
Invicta Dynamos	Gillingham	Planet Ice Gillingham
Milton Keynes Thunder	Milton Keynes	Planet Ice Milton Keynes
Oxford City Stars	Oxford	Oxford Ice Rink
Romford Buccaneers	Romford	Sapphire Ice and Leisure Centre
Slough Jets	Slough	Slough Ice Arena/The Hangar
Solent Devils	Gosport	Planet Ice Gosport
Streatham IHC	Streatham	Streatham Ice and Leisure Centre
Swindon Wildcats 2	Swindon	Link Centre

== Teams' participations in other cups ==
In June 2017, the NIHL confirmed there would be two new competitions alongside the league.

=== NIHL National Cup ===
The NIHL National Cup, features twelves NIHL teams in four regional groups. Six teams from the NIHL South Division 1 will take part, in groups C and D.

Group A: Billingham Stars, Blackburn Hawks, Solway Sharks

Group B: Sheffield Steeldogs, Peterborough Phantoms, Hull Pirates

Group C: Invicta Dynamos, London Raiders, Streatham IHC

Group D: Basingstoke Bison, Bracknell Bees, Swindon Wildcats

Group matches are two home, two away, against the other teams for a total of eight games. The top two sides move to quarter-finals to be held in early 2018.

However, this only lasted one season, before being replace by the Britton Cup, which is solely for clubs in the division and runs alongside early league fixtures counting as results for both the league and cup. The teams are split into two groups, with the top two from each group going onto the semi-finals. Chelmsford Chieftains won the 2024/25 edition, beating Slough Jets 9-5 on aggregate.

== 2016-17 standings ==
The last season featuring the old division structure was 2016-17, and finished with Chelmsford Chieftains topping the table.

	GP	W	T	L	F	A	Pt
Chelmsford Chieftains A	28	25	2	1	181	78	52
Invicta Dynamos A	28	16	2	10	113	99	34
Streatham Redhawks	28	15	2	11	94	86	32
Oxford City Stars	28	12	4	12	122	114	28
London Raiders	28	11	4	13	92	105	26
Solent & Gosport Devils	28	11	2	15	91	102	24
Milton Keynes Thunder	28	9	2	17	91	125	20
Bracknell Hornets	28	2	4	22	67	142	8
