= Solent Devils =

Ice hockey team in Hampshire, England

- City: Gosport, Hampshire
- League: NIHL
- Conference: Division One South
- Founded: 2003
- Home arena: Gosport Ice Arena
- Colors: White, Red & Black
- Head coach: Alex Murray (England)
- Affiliates: Solent Devils 2, NIHL 2 Solent Amazons, WNIHL 2
- Website: Solent Devils

Franchise history
- 2003 – 2007: Solent & Gosport Sharks
- 2007– 2014: Solent & Gosport Devils
- 2014 – Present: Solent Devils

Championships
- Regular season titles: 2011/2012 ENL 2 South
- Division titles: League Champions 2011-2012 ENL South 2
- Playoff championships: 2017/18 NIHL South 2 Playoff Champions

The Solent Devils are a professional English ice hockey team based in Gosport, Hampshire. They are members of the NIHL South Division 1. They play their games at Gosport Ice Arena. Alexander Cole is currently the captain and Alex Murray is the head coach. They are most renowned for winning the 2011/12 title with 5 games to spare.

The Devils were founded in 2003 (Solent & Gosport Sharks 2003–2007, Solent & Gosport Devils 2007–2014, Solent Devils 2014-present).

== Club roster 2022-23 ==
(*) Denotes a Non-British Trained player (Import)

Netminders
No.	Nat.	Player	Catches	Date of birth	Place of birth	Acquired	Contract
1	(Guernsey)	Chico Cole	L	30 August 1992 (age 33)	Guernsey	2014 from Wightlink Raiders	22/23
50	(England)	Rory Martin-Edwards		26 March 2002 (age 23)	Portsmouth, England	2021 from Bracknell Hornets	22/23
98	(England)	Mark Duffy	L	2 April 1988 (age 37)	Camberley, England	2021 from Oxford City Stars	22/23

Defencemen
No.	Nat.	Player	Shoots	Date of birth	Place of birth	Acquired	Contract
2	(Lithuania)	Kristijonas Nekrosevicius		12 March 2003 (age 22)	Lithuania	2021 from Raiders U18	22/23
8	(England)	Alexander Cole	R	22 January 1991 (age 35)	Portsmouth, England	2009 from Guildford Phoenix	22/23
15	(England)	Jamie Fitzpatrick	R	16 November 1990 (age 35)	Gosport, England	2007 from Solent U19	22/23
18	(England)	Harry Cloutman		2002 (age 20)	Gosport, England	2018 from Solent U18	22/23
24	(England)	Scott Cooper		1991 (age 31)	England	2019 from Billingham Stars	22/23
41	(England)	Mason Wild	R	24 May 1990 (age 35)	Oxford, England	2015 from Oxford City Stars	22/23
44	(Scotland)	Calumn Perella-Fox		5 August 1993 (age 32)	Scotland	2018	22/23
71	(England)	Ben Lock	R	13 June 1994 (age 31)	Woking, England	2014 from Wightlink Raiders	22/23

Forwards
No.	Nat.	Player	Shoots	Date of birth	Place of birth	Acquired	Contract
5	(England)	Mark Pitts	R	10 July 1989 (age 36)	England	2016 from Basingstoke Buffalo	22/23
6	(England)	Connor Hutchison	L	29 June 1999 (age 26)	Frimley, England	2021 from Bracknell Hornets	22/23
9	(England)	Daniel Lackey	R	31 March 1990 (age 35)	Basingstoke, England	2018 from Basingstoke Buffalo	22/23
10	(England)	Alexander Trendall	R	5 August 1996 (age 29)	Ryde, England	2015 from Tampa Bay Juniors	22/23
17	(England)	Riley Panter		16 August 2005 (age 20)	England	2021 from Solent U18	Two-Way
21	(England)	Jack Peacock		20 August 2002 (age 23)	England	2021 from Basingstoke Buffalo	22/23
22	(England)	Charlie Wedge		25 March 2003 (age 22)	England	2021 from Basingstoke U18	Two-Way
23	(Canada) (United Kingdom)	Drew Campbell	L	8 September 1976 (age 49)	Brantford, ON, Canada	2016 from Haringey Racers	22/23
34	(England)	Liam Coleman	L	29 April 1999 (age 26)	Hereford, England	2022 from Bristol Pitbulls	22/23
47	(England)	Oscar Evans	L	3 August 2001 (age 24)	England	2021 from Basingstoke Bison	22/23
73	(England)	Alex Murray	L	19 June 1989 (age 36)	Southampton, England	2013 from Wightlink Raiders	22/23
77	(England)	Luke Forsyth	R	31 October 1991 (age 34)	England	2022	22/23

Team Staff
No.	Nat.	Name	Acquired	Role	Place of birth	Joined from
73	(England)	Alex Murray	2013/14	Player-Coach	Southampton, England
	(England)	Martin Clayton	2014/15	Goaltending Coach	Southampton, England
	(England)	Graham Cole	2014/15	Equipment Manager	England
	(England)	Steve Ferguson	2018/19	General Manager	England

== 2021/22 Outgoing ==
Outgoing
No.	Nat.	Player	Shoots	Date of birth	Place of birth	Leaving For
19	(England)	Elliot Lewis		31 December 2001 (age 24)	England	Bristol Pitbulls, NIHL National
