= Carl Greenhous =

Canadian ice hockey player

- Born: October 28, 1972 (age 52); Ottawa, Ontario, Canada
- Height: 6 ft 2 in (188 cm)
- Weight: 216 lb (98 kg; 15 st 6 lb)
- Position: Defence
- Shot: Right
- Played for: Manchester Phoenix
- Playing career: 1995–2006

Carl Greenhous (born October 28, 1972) is a Canadian retired professional ice hockey player. He played professionally in England and in the minor leagues of North America.

Greenhous was born in Ottawa, Ontario. While a keen amateur, Greenhous' career really sparked into life with his move to Europe, and specifically the United Kingdom in 1995.

He signed with the Chelmsford Chieftains of the British National League, then regarded as the second tier of ice hockey in the U.K. under the Ice Hockey Superleague. Greenhous played just three games in his first spell in Chelmsford, and it was not until the 1997/98 season when he would play regular hockey for a professional organisation. Greenhous again played in the BNL, this time with the Telford Tigers. He played just seven games before his move back to his native North America to sign for the Memphis Riverkings of the Central Hockey League.

Greenhous found his form, and became an important player for the Riverkings, appearing in 36 regular season and 4 post-season games. He was rewarded with a contract for the following season, this time playing 69 regular season games and 4 post season appearances. Greenhous managed 159 penalty minutes and helped out the offence with 10 points.

He did not stay in Memphis though, and Greenhous chose to return to his adopted home of England, for a second spell with the Chelmsford Chieftains, now playing in the EPL. It was a much longer spell than the first, and Greenhous managed 24 total appearances. He stayed, and started the 2000/01 season as a Chieftain but swiftly moved to sign for the Romford Raiders, an EPL rival of the Chieftains.

Greenhous moved again the following summer, and was signed for the Invicta Dynamos to help provide experience and backbone to the team. Greenhous was such a success in the 22 games he played in that he was given the responsibility of a player-coach role with the Dynamos for the 2002/03 term. Due to off ice financial troubles Greenhous' contract was not renewed and he chose to again return to North America, this time with the Fort Worth Brahmas, again of the CHL.

Again Greenhous returned to the U.K. mid-season, and was signed by the Manchester Phoenix along with Brahmas teammate Chad Brandimore. The Phoenix were playing their debut season as an organisation following the collapse of the earlier Manchester franchise, the Manchester Storm. Greenhous was a solid player for the Phoenix and helped to add a physical presence on the ice. Despite the good start made by the Phoenix in the EIHL, the franchise was temporarily suspended in 2004 and only returned in time for the 2006/07 term.

This prompted Greenhous to start his third spell with the Chieftains. He remained with them for both the 2004/05 and 2005/06 seasons before announcing his retirement from the game due to persistent injury problems.

== Career stats ==
			Regular season					Playoffs				
Season	Team	League	GP	G	A	Pts	PIM	GP	G	A	Pts	PIM
1995-96	Chelmsford Chieftains	BNL	3	0	1	1	16	-	-	-	-	-
1997-98	Telford Wildfoxes	BNL	7	0	1	1	0	-	-	-	-	-
1997-98	Memphis RiverKings	CHL	36	2	8	10	47	4	0	2	2	0
1998-99	Memphis RiverKings	CHL	69	3	7	10	159	4	1	1	2	0
1999-00	Chelmsford Chieftains	EPL	21	4	6	10	12	2	0	0	0	0
2000-01	Chelmsford Chieftains	EPL	2	0	1	1	14	-	-	-	-	-
2000-01	Romford Raiders	EPL	23	0	2	2	24	4	0	1	1	6
2001-02	Invicta Dynamos	EPL	0	0	0	0	0	-	-	-	-	-
2002-03	Invicta Dynamos	EPL	34	13	19	32	40	6	2	4	6	8
2003-04	Fort Worth Brahmas	CHL	25	2	4	6	19	-	-	-	-	-
2003-04	Manchester Phoenix	EIHL	30	0	4	4	10	6	0	1	1	0
2004-05	Chelmsford Chieftains	EPL	32	7	15	22	28	5	0	5	5	22
2005-06	Chelmsford Chieftains	EPL	47	0	20	20	60	-	-	-	-	-
Career Totals			329	31	88	119	429	31	3	14	17	36

- League appearances only, correct up to 06/06/08
