= Romford Ice Arena =

Ice rink in Romford, London, England

Coordinates: 51.5698°N 0.1813°E

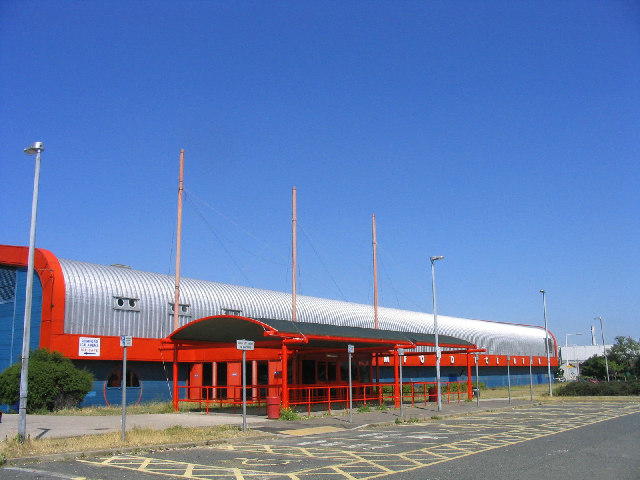
Romford Ice Arena pictured in 2005.

Romford Ice Arena was an ice rink located in Romford in the London Borough of Havering, England. The venue was built in the 1980s and at the time of opening in 1987 was equipped with a full range of facilities, including a cafe and arcade games. The venue closed in April 2013. It has now been replaced by the Sapphire Ice and Leisure Centre, which opened in 2018 on a nearby site and was named in honour of Queen Elizabeth II's Sapphire Jubilee (65 years as monarch).

== Home of the Romford Raiders ==
It was the home of the Romford Raiders ice hockey team. The first game at the Ice Arena took place on Sunday 13 September 1987 as the Romford Raiders defeated Oxford City Stars 9–6 in front of 479 spectators. David Jones (Oxford City Stars) scored the first goal of the game, however the Raiders' first goal was scored by Erskine Douglas. In addition to ice hockey, the arena had resident professional figure skating coaches. The rink was also used for public skating, as a conference centre and a party venue. The building was owned by the London Borough of Havering Council and leased out.

In December 2007 the ice rink featured in the BBC Christmas ident.

In 2011 it was reported that Romford Ice Arena was going to be demolished and rebuilt with additional features such as a gymnasium and swimming pool, but initially it was decided to simply renovate the existing building.

== Closing and replacement ==
In April 2013, the original Ice Arena closed permanently. The building was supposed to be replaced with a Morrisons superstore(site still vacant in September 2024), and a new leisure centre has been built in Romford town centre, on Western Road. The Sapphire Ice and Leisure Centre opened to the public on 3 February 2018. It is five storeys high and includes an eight-lane pool for competitions and a 56m by 26m ice rink. Other leisure amenities such as saunas, a state-of-the-art gym, dance studios, fitness rooms as well as cafes and retail units are provided on the upper floors. From an external viewpoint, the combination of the building's rectangular shape and its lightweight facade were used to mimic the appearance of an ice cube. The ice hockey team returned to the new rink, but were renamed the London Raiders. Over half a million people used the new centre in its first year.
