= Solent Devils 2 =

Ice hockey team in Hampshire, England

- City: Gosport, Hampshire
- League: NIHL 2 South West Division
- Founded: 2019
- Home arena: Gosport Ice Arena
- Colors: White, Red & Black
- Head coach: Paul Rogers
- Captain: Alexander Clarke
- Affiliate: Solent Devils

Franchise history
- 2019-: Solent Devils 2

The Solent Devils 2 are an English amateur ice hockey team based in Gosport, Hampshire. They currently play in the NIHL 2 South West Division. The Solent Devils 2 are a minor league affiliate of the Solent Devils of the NIHL 1 South Division.

== Season-by-season record ==
| Season | League | GP | W | T | L | OTW | OTL | Pts. | Rank | Post Season |
|---|---|---|---|---|---|---|---|---|---|---|
| 2019-2020 | NIHL 2 | 20 | 3 | - | 16 | 1 | 0 | 8 | 5th | Playoffs Cancelled |

== Club roster 2020–21 ==
Netminders
| No. | Nat. | Player | Catches | Date of birth | Place of birth | Acquired | Contract |

Defencemen
| No. | Nat. | Player | Shoots | Date of birth | Place of birth | Acquired | Contract |
|---|---|---|---|---|---|---|---|
| 18 | (England) | Harry Cloutman | | 2002 (18) | Gosport, England | 2017 from Isle of Wight Raiders | Two Way |

Forwards
| No. | Nat. | Player | Shoots | Date of birth | Place of birth | Acquired | Contract |

== 2020/21 Outgoing ==
Outgoing
| No. | Nat. | Player | Shoots | Date of birth | Place of birth | Leaving For |
