= Premier Ice Hockey League =

Premier Ice Hockey League will become one of two professional ice hockey leagues in the United Kingdom (the other being the Elite Ice Hockey League). It will replace the English Premier Ice Hockey League and the inaugural season took place in 2017–18.

A meeting was held on Sunday 26 February 2017 which confirmed the creation of the new league.

== Teams ==
Team	City/Area	Arena	Capacity	Founded	Joined	Tenure	Head coach	Captain
Basingstoke Bison	Basingstoke, Hampshire	Planet Ice Silverdome Arena	2,000	1988	2009	2017	Doug Sheppard (P/C)	Joe Greener
Bracknell Bees	Bracknell, Berkshire	John Nike Leisuresport Complex	2,400	1987	2005	2017	Lukas Smital (P/C)	Matt Foord
Hull Pirates	Hull, East Riding of Yorkshire	Hull Arena	3,750	2015	2015	2017	Dominc Osman (P/C)	Nathan Salem (England)
Peterborough Phantoms	Peterborough, Cambridgeshire	Planet Ice Peterborough	1,250	2002	2002	2017	Slava Koulikov (P/C)	James Ferrara
Sheffield Steeldogs	Sheffield, South Yorkshire	IceSheffield	1,500	2001	2005	2017	Greg Wood (P/C)	Ben Morgan (England)
Swindon Wildcats	Swindon, Wiltshire	Link Centre	2,800	1986	1997	2017	Aaron Nell (P/C)	Jan Košťál (Czech Republic)
Telford Tigers	Telford, Shropshire	Telford Ice Rink	600	2001	2010	2017	Tom Watkins	Jason Silverthorn
