= Bracknell Wasps =

Ice hockey team in England

- City: Bracknell, England
- League: NIHL 2 South East Division
- Founded: 2019
- Home arena: Yet to be announced
- Colors: Black, White and Gold
- Owner: JNL Group
- Head coach: Danny Hughes
- Captain: Liam Poulson
- Affiliates: Bracknell Bees, Bracknell Hornets

Franchise history
- 2019-: Bracknell Wasps

The Bracknell Wasps are an ice hockey team from Bracknell, England that compete in the NIHL 2 South East Division. They are a minor league affiliate of the Bracknell Bees, who play in the NIHL National Division.

== Season-by-season record ==
Season	League	GP	W	T	L	OTW	OTL	Pts.	Rank	Postseason
2019–2020	NIHL 2	20	5	-	10	3	0	16	4	Playoffs Cancelled

== Club roster 2020–21 ==
Netminders
No.	Nat.	Player	Catches	Date of birth	Place of birth	Acquired	Contract

Defencemen
No.	Nat.	Player	Shoots	Date of birth	Place of birth	Acquired	Contract

Forwards
No.	Nat.	Player	Shoots	Date of birth	Place of birth	Acquired	Contract

== 2020/21 Outgoing ==
Outgoing
No.	Nat.	Player	Shoots	Date of birth	Place of birth	Leaving For
37	(England)	Danny Hughes	L	1 October 1982 (age 43)	Middlesex, England	Haringey Huskies
