= 1993 Centennial Cup =

1993 Manitoba Centennial Cup
Tournament details
- Venue: Amherst, Nova Scotia
- Dates: May 1993
- Teams: 5

Final positions
- Champions: Kelowna Spartans (1st title)
- Runners-up: Chateauguay Elites

Tournament statistics
- Games played: 13
- Scoring leader: Martin Masa (Kelowna)

Awards
- MVP: Steffon Walby (Kelowna)

The 1993 Centennial Cup is the 23rd Junior "A" 1993 ice hockey National Championship for the Canadian Junior A Hockey League.

The Centennial Cup was competed for by the winners of the Doyle Cup, Anavet Cup, Central Canadian Championship, the Eastern Canadian Champion and a host city.

The tournament was hosted by the Amherst Ramblers and Amherst, Nova Scotia.

== The Playoffs ==
=== Round Robin ===
Pos	League (Ticket)	Team	Pld	W	L	GF	GA	GD	Qualification
1	BCHL (Doyle Cup)	Kelowna Spartans	4	4	0	27	12	+15	Semi-final
2	MJAHL (Host)	Amherst Ramblers	4	3	1	15	10	+5	Semi-final
3	LHJAAAQ (Dudley Hewitt Cup)	Chateauguay Elites	4	2	2	13	14	−1	Semi-final
4	MJAHL (Callaghan Cup)	Antigonish Bulldogs	4	1	3	15	21	−6	Semi-final
5	SJHL (Anavet Cup)	Flin Flon Bombers	4	0	4	6	19	−13	

==== Results ====
Amherst Ramblers defeated Chateauguay Elites 2-1
Kelowna Spartans defeated Chateauguay Elites 8-3
Antigonish Bulldogs defeated Flin Flon Bombers 4-2
Kelowna Spartans defeated Antigonish Bulldogs 10-4
Amherst Ramblers defeated Flin Flon Bombers 6-0
Kelowna Spartans defeated Amherst Ramblers 5-2
Chateauguay Elites defeated Flin Flon Bombers 5-1
Amherst Ramblers defeated Antigonish Bulldogs 5-4
Kelowna Spartans defeated Flin Flon 4-3 for the Abbott Cup
Chateauguay Elites defeated Antigonish Bulldogs 4-3 in Double Overtime

=== Semi-finals and Final ===
Semi-finals
1	Kelowna Spartans	4
4	Antigonish Bulldogs	1
2	Amherst Ramblers	5
3	Chateauguay Elites	6

Royal Bank Cup Finals
1	Kelowna Spartans	7
3	Chateauguay Elites	2

Please Note: The semi-final, Amherst vs. Chateauguay, was won in Overtime

== Awards ==
Most Valuable Player: Steffon Walby (Kelowna Spartans)
Top Scorer: Martin Masa (Kelowna Spartans)
Most Sportsmanlike Player: Martin Duval (Chateauguay Elites)

=== All-Star Team ===
Forward

Curtis Fry (Kelowna Spartans)
Martin Masa (Kelowna Spartans)
Steffon Walby (Kelowna Spartans)

Defence

John Copley (Antigonish Bulldogs)
Neil Sorochan (Amherst Ramblers)

Goal

Todd Hunter (Amherst Ramblers)

== Roll of League Champions ==
AJHL: Olds Grizzlys
BCHL: Kelowna Spartans
CJHL: Ottawa Senators
MJHL: Dauphin Kings
MJAHL: Antigonish Bulldogs
NOJHL: Powassan Hawks
PCJHL: Williams Lake Mustangs
QPJHL: Chateauguay Elites
SJHL: Flin Flon Bombers

== See also ==
- Canadian Junior A Hockey League
- Royal Bank Cup
- Anavet Cup
- Doyle Cup
- Dudley Hewitt Cup
- Fred Page Cup
- Abbott Cup
- Mowat Cup
