= 1994 Centennial Cup =

1994 Manitoba Centennial Cup
Tournament details
- Venue: Olds, Alberta
- Dates: May 1994
- Teams: 5

Final positions
- Champions: Olds Grizzlys (1st title)
- Runners-up: Kelowna Spartans

Tournament statistics
- Games played: 13
- Scoring leader: Martin Duval (Chateauguay)

Awards
- MVP: Tyler Graham (Olds)

The 1994 Centennial Cup is the 24th Junior "A" 1994 ice hockey National Championship for the Canadian Junior A Hockey League.

The Centennial Cup was competed for by the winners of the Doyle Cup, Anavet Cup, Dudley Hewitt Cup, the Eastern Canadian Champion and a host city.

The tournament was hosted by the Olds Grizzlys and Olds, Alberta.

== The Playoffs ==
=== Round Robin ===
| Pos | League (Ticket) | Team | Pld | W | L | GF | GA | GD | Qualification |
|---|---|---|---|---|---|---|---|---|---|
| 1 | AJHL (Doyle Cup and Host) | Olds Grizzlys | 4 | 4 | 0 | 31 | 6 | +25 | Semi-final |
| 2 | BCJHL (Doyle Cup Runner-up) | Kelowna Spartans | 4 | 3 | 1 | 21 | 17 | +4 | Semi-final |
| 3 | LHJAAAQ (Dudley Hewitt Cup) | Chateauguay Elites | 4 | 2 | 2 | 24 | 24 | 0 | Semi-final |
| 4 | SJHL (Anavet Cup) | Weyburn Red Wings | 4 | 1 | 3 | 9 | 19 | −10 | Semi-final |
| 5 | MJAHL (Callaghan Cup) | Antigonish Bulldogs | 4 | 0 | 4 | 9 | 28 | −19 | |

==== Results ====
Olds Grizzlys defeat Chateauguay Elites 11-3
Kelowna Spartans defeat Weyburn Red Wings 5-2
Chateauguay Elites defeat Antigonish Bulldogs 9-1
Kelowna Spartans defeat Antigonish Bulldogs 5-4
Olds Grizzlys defeat Weyburn Red Wings 5-0 for the Abbott Cup
Weyburn Red Wings defeat Antigonish Bulldogs 4-3 in Double Overtime
Chateauguay Elites defeat Weyburn Red Wings 6-3
Olds Grizzlys defeat Kelowna Spartans 5-2
Kelowna Spartans defeat Chateauguay Elites 9-6
Olds Grizzlys defeat Antigonish Bulldogs 10-1

=== Semi and Finals ===
Semi-finals
1 | Olds Grizzlys | 4
4 | Weyburn Red Wings | 3
2 | Kelowna Spartans | 3
3 | Chateauguay Elites | 1

Royal Bank Cup Finals
1 | Olds Grizzlys | 5
2 | Kelowna Spartans | 4

Please Note: The final was won in Overtime

== Awards ==
Most Valuable Player: Tyler Graham (Olds Grizzlys)
Top Scorer: Martin Duval (Chateauguay Elites)
Most Sportsmanlike Player: Bill Muckalt (Kelowna Spartans)

=== All-Star Team ===
Forward

Christian Desrochers (Chateauguay Elites)
Joe Murphy (Olds Grizzlys)
Martin Duval (Chateauguay Elites)

Defence

John Dlouhy (Olds Grizzlys)
Chad Sturrock (Olds Grizzlys)

Goal

Travis Kirby (Weyburn Red Wings)

== Roll of League Champions ==
AJHL: Olds Grizzlys
BCHL: Kelowna Spartans
CJHL: Gloucester Rangers
MJHL: St. Boniface Saints
MJAHL: Antigonish Bulldogs
MetJHL: Wexford Raiders
NOJHL: Powassan Hawks
OPJHL: Orillia Terriers
PCJHL: Kimberley Dynamiters
QPJHL: Chateauguay Elites
SJHL: Weyburn Red Wings

== See also ==
- Canadian Junior A Hockey League
- Royal Bank Cup
- Anavet Cup
- Doyle Cup
- Dudley Hewitt Cup
- Fred Page Cup
- Abbott Cup
- Mowat Cup
