= Ryde Arena =

Former ice rink in Ryde, Isle of Wight

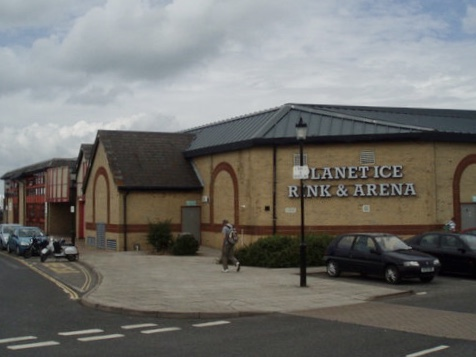
- Planet Ice Isle of Wight in 2009
- Interactive map of Ryde Arena
- Former names: Planet Ice Isle of Wight
- Location: Ryde, Isle of Wight, England
- Coordinates: 50.7325671°N 1.1582167°W
- Capacity: 1,000 spectators
- Type: Arena
- Event: Sporting events
- Surface: Ice, concrete
- Field size: 44 m (144 ft) x 22 m (72 ft)

Construction
- Groundbreaking: May 1990
- Opened: 20 May 1991
- Closed: 6 October 2016
- Cost: £5 million

Ryde Arena (previously Planet Ice Isle of Wight) was an ice rink in Ryde, Isle of Wight, England. It was opened in 1991 and had a capacity of 1,000 spectators. The venue was the only ice rink in Isle of Wight, functioning as home ice to the Wightlink Raiders of the National Ice Hockey League (NIHL), in addition to a minimum of four synchronized skating teams and a number of figure skaters.

== Closure ==
In September 1999, the Isle of Wight Council agreed to grant Planet Ice a 125 year lease for Ryde Arena in exchange for £600,000, with the obligation to run the property as an ice rink for fifteen years and to carry out £800,000 of improvements. Planet Ice took over operation of Ryde Arena in February 2001, renaming it Planet Ice Isle of Wight. During 2011–2013, Planet Ice went into administration, resulting in the Ryde Arena leasehold changing hands several times and a sublease for the building being created. On 1 December 2014, the Ryde Arena lease was sold for £1,000,000 to AEW UK.

In February 2015, Planet Ice informed the 40-person staff that the venue would be closing on 25 March 2015, as it was operating at a loss (later reported to be a £160,000 annual loss). An immediate and passionate community campaign was launched to save the rink, which coalesced in the creation of the Ryde Arena Trust Ltd (RAL). In April 2015, The RAL was able to sign a 35-year lease for Ryde Arena with The Bank of New York Mellon, with an annual rent of £130,000 to be paid to AEW UK.

On 21 November 2015, the building sustained significant damage and flooding from storms. Environmental Health concluded it was unsafe for public access until repairs were made. AEW UK contributed £40,000 of repairs to the roof over the ice pad and the ice was opened in February 2016.

Ryde Arena was shuttered and its locks changed by bailiffs repossessing the property for non-payment of rent on 6 October 2016. It was later reported that the Ryde Arena Trust Ltd had been attempting to negotiate a decrease in rent on account of the profits lost and repair expenses incurred as a result of the November 2015 storms but, ultimately, owed £200,000 in back-rent.

With the closing of Ryde Arena the nearest rink was at Gosport on the mainland – a 1 hour and 40-minute journey via a ferry. On 23 October 2016, the Wightlink Raiders announced their withdrawal from the NIHL, writing, "We have been forced to make this sad decision as we cannot find enough ice time to continue functioning, and without games we cannot survive financially."

In November 2016, the Ryde Arena Trust Ltd entered voluntary liquidation.

A new multi-sport center, called the Smallbrook Ice & Leisure Center (SILC), was proposed in 2019 by a group of interested parties including the Ryde Arena Community Action Group (RACAG), Ryde School, and the Isle of Wight Council and its Regeneration Team, among others. At its core, the proposal includes an IIHF-standard scale ice rink flanked by two multi-sport courts. The project is dependent on independent fundraising and funding grants, including from Sport England.
