= AEW Capital Management =

Real estate investment firm based in Boston

AEW Capital Management LP
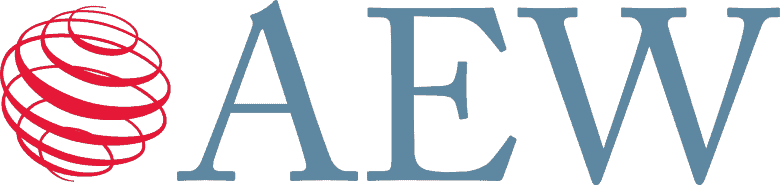
- Formerly: Aldrich, Eastman & Waltch
- Type: Subsidiary
- Industry: Private equity real estate
- Founded: 1981; 45 years ago
- Founder: Peter Aldrich; Tom Eastman; Mark Waltch
- Headquarters: Boston, Massachusetts, U.S.
- Number of locations: 12 offices
- AUM: US$91.6 billion (Q2 2022)
- Number of employees: 830 (2022)
- Parent: Natixis Investment Managers
- Subsidiaries: AEW UK
- Website: www.aew.com

AEW Capital Management (AEW) is an American real estate investment firm headquartered in Boston. The firm is the real estate asset management platform of Natixis Investment Managers.

In 2022, the firm was ranked by PERE (under Private Equity International) as the eighth largest Private Equity Real Estate firm based on total fundraising over the most recent five-year period.

== Background ==
AEW was founded in 1981 by Peter Aldrich, Tom Eastman and Mark Waltch. The firm's name AEW is an abbreviation of Aldrich, Eastman & Waltch.

AEW expanded into Europe in 1996 by opening an office in Paris and then into Asia in 2006 by opening an office in Singapore.

In 2016, AEW Europe merged with Ciloger, a retail property investment firm owned by La Banque postale and CNP Assurances.

AEW operates in 12 locations and is headquartered in Boston with additional main offices in London, Paris and Singapore. Its UK entity operates as AEW UK.

The majority of AEW's capital comes from Pension funds and Insurance companies.

== Investments ==
- 1 New York Plaza
- Georgetown Park
- 650 California Street
- Metrocenter
- Willis Tower

== Disputes ==
NMS Properties launched a lawsuit against AEW in 2014 over a Nine building property portfolio in Santa Monica that was jointly owned by the two firms. NMS tried to buy out AEW's stake for $106 million but AEW stated NMS forged the agreement. After litigation between the two firms for several years, AEW eventually won the lawsuit then took over control of the properties and sold them for $430 million.
