= Joel Savage =

Canadian ice hockey player (born 1969)

- Born: December 25, 1969 (age 56) Surrey, British Columbia, Canada
- Height: 5 ft 11 in (180 cm)
- Weight: 205 lb (93 kg; 14 st 9 lb)
- Position: Right wing
- Shot: Right
- Played for: Buffalo Sabres
- NHL draft: 13th overall, 1988; Buffalo Sabres
- Playing career: 1989–2004

Joel Savage (born December 25, 1969) is a Canadian former professional ice hockey player. Savage was drafted in the first round, 13th overall, by the Buffalo Sabres in the 1988 NHL entry draft. Savage played three NHL games, which came during the 1990–91 season with the Sabres. Savage played his junior hockey career with the Victoria Cougars of the Western Hockey League, compiling 143 points in 197 games.

== Playing career ==
Savage's North American professional career included stints with the Rochester Americans of the American Hockey League (1989–1993) and Fort Wayne Komets (1992–1994), San Diego Gulls (1993–1994), and Kalamazoo Wings (1993–1994) of the International Hockey League. Savage also played in 39 games with the Canadian National Team between 1994 and 1996.

Savage played several seasons professionally in Europe before retiring following the 2003–2004 season. In Europe, he played with the Starbulls Rosenheim, Frankfurt Lions, and Adler Mannheim of Deutsche Eishockey Liga in Germany, and HC Lugano and EV Zug of Nationalliga A in Switzerland. In 2002, he became a Swiss citizen through marriage. Savage eventually returned to Canada and settled in Cranbrook, British Columbia, where he is the President of Havaday Developments Inc., which is the developer of the Wildstone golf resort in Cranbrook in partnership with Gary Player.

== Career statistics ==
=== Regular season and playoffs ===
			Regular season					Playoffs
Season	Team	League	GP	G	A	Pts	PIM	GP	G	A	Pts	PIM
1985–86	Kelowna Packers	BCHL	43	10	12	22	76	11	2	1	3	6
1986–87	Victoria Cougars	WHL	68	14	13	27	48	5	2	0	2	0
1987–88	Victoria Cougars	WHL	37	32	69	73	—	—	—	—	—
1988–89	Victoria Cougars	WHL	60	17	30	47	95	6	1	1	2	8
1989–90	Rochester Americans	AHL	43	6	7	13	39	5	0	1	1	4
1990–91	Buffalo Sabres	NHL	3	0	1	1	0	—	—	—	—	—
1990–91	Rochester Americans	AHL	61	25	19	44	45	15	3	3	6	8
1991–92	Rochester Americans	AHL	59	8	14	22	39	9	2	0	2	8
1992–93	Rochester Americans	AHL	6	1	1	2	6	3	0	0	0	12
1992–93	Fort Wayne Komets	IHL	46	21	16	37	60	10	3	5	8	22
1993–94	Fort Wayne Komets	IHL	31	2	11	13	29	—	—	—	—	—
1993–94	San Diego Gulls	IHL	20	0	2	2	4	—	—	—	—	—
1993–94	Kalamazoo Wings	IHL	4	2	1	3	0	2	0	0	0	4
1994–95	Canadian National Team	Intl	37	10	17	27	47	—	—	—	—	—
1995–96	Star Bulls Rosenheim GmbH	DEL	50	16	38	54	62	4	0	3	3	18
1996–97	Star Bulls Rosenheim GmbH	DEL	46	8	19	27	108	3	0	2	2	2
1997–98	Frankfurt Lions	DEL	27	7	14	21	40	—	—	—	—	—
1997–98	EV Zug	NDA	11	1	3	4	8	—	—	—	—	—
1998–99	Frankfurt Lions	DEL	49	13	11	24	56	8	4	3	7	8
1999–00	Adler Mannheim	DEL	47	10	13	23	61	5	0	0	0	4
2000–01	HC Lugano	NLA	41	8	8	16	63	18	4	3	7	30
2001–02	EV Zug	NLA	31	12	12	24	38	5	0	0	0	6
2002–03	EV Zug	NLA	34	3	5	8	24	—	—	—	—	—
2003–04	EV Zug	NLA	47	4	6	10	67	2	0	0	0	2
DEL totals			219	54	95	149	327	20	4	8	12	32
NHL totals			3	0	1	1	0	—	—	—	—	—

Preceded by Pierre Turgeon	Buffalo Sabres first-round draft pick 1988	Succeeded by Kevin Haller
