= Martin Máša =

Czech ice hockey left winger (born 1973)

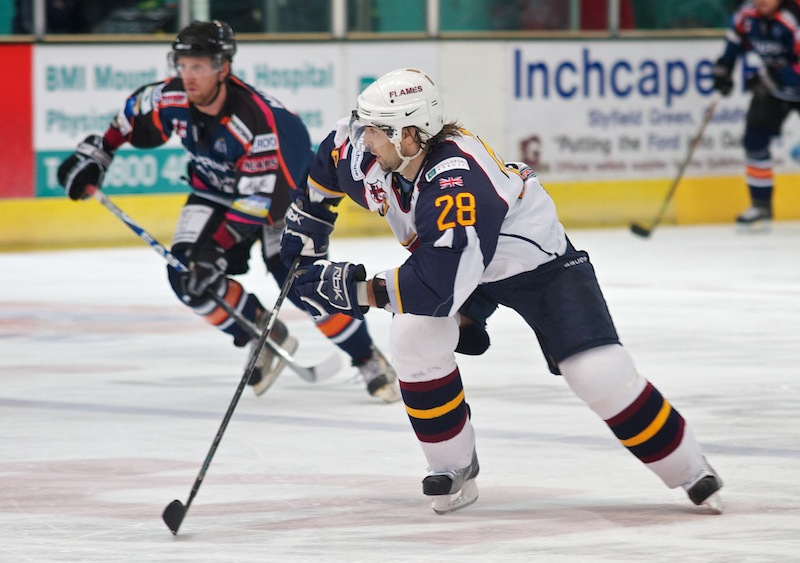
- Born: August 10, 1973 (age 51); Sokolov, Czechoslovakia
- Height: 6 ft 1 in (185 cm)
- Weight: 210 lb (95 kg; 15 st 0 lb)
- Position: Left wing
- Shot: Left
- Played for: EPIHL; Bracknell Bees; Orlando Solar Bears; Providence Bruins; Saint John Flames; Springfield Falcons; Kansas City Blades; Guildford Flames
- NHL draft: Undrafted
- Playing career: 1991–2013

Martin Máša (born August 10, 1973) is a Czech ice hockey left winger who plays for Bracknell Bees in the English Premier Ice Hockey League. He has previously played for teams in France, England, Czech Republic, and North America.

== Trivia ==
Fellow countryman Lukas Smital has skated on six different teams with Máša: 1996-99 Johnstown Chiefs; 1997-98 Saint John Flames; 2000-01 Greensboro Generals; 2003-04 Texas Wildcatters; 2004-05 Bracknell Bees; 2009–2011 Guildford Flames; 2011–present Bracknell Bees;

== Career statistics ==
			Regular season					Playoffs
Season	Team	League	GP	G	A	Pts	PIM	GP	G	A	Pts	PIM
1990–91	HC Zetor Brno	Czech2	1	0	0	0	0	—	—	—	—	—
1991–92	HC Zetor Brno	Czech	16	2	0	2	—	—	—	—	—	—
1992–93	Kelowna Spartans	BCJHL	47	35	32	67	47	—	—	—	—	—
1993–94	Kelowna Spartans	BCJHL	58	48	59	107	76	—	—	—	—	—
1994–95	Kansas City Blades	IHL	3	0	0	0	0	—	—	—	—	—
1994–95	Fort Worth Fire	CHL	61	31	35	66	104	—	—	—	—	—
1995–96	Knoxville Cherokees	ECHL	17	6	3	9	22	—	—	—	—	—
1995–96	HC Kometa BVV Brno	Czech	11	1	2	3	6	—	—	—	—	—
1996–97	Johnstown Chiefs	ECHL	59	36	32	68	114	—	—	—	—	—
1997–98	Springfield Falcons	AHL	5	0	3	3	6	—	—	—	—	—
1997–98	Saint John Flames	AHL	10	0	2	2	4	—	—	—	—	—
1997–98	Johnstown Chiefs	ECHL	59	23	42	65	183	—	—	—	—	—
1998–99	Orlando Solar Bears	IHL	3	0	0	0	2	—	—	—	—	—
1998–99	Johnstown Chiefs	ECHL	64	27	30	57	83	—	—	—	—	—
1999–00	Orlando Solar Bears	IHL	5	0	1	1	2	—	—	—	—	—
1999–00	Providence Bruins	AHL	11	2	2	4	6	—	—	—	—	—
1999–00	Greenville Grrrowl	ECHL	57	21	41	62	75	13	8	8	16	23
2000–01	Greenville Grrrowl	ECHL	56	15	26	41	128	—	—	—	—	—
2000–01	Greensboro Generals	ECHL	13	5	6	11	12	—	—	—	—	—
2001–02	Greenville Grrrowl	ECHL	69	24	44	68	73	17	6	11	17	31
2002–03	Greenville Grrrowl	ECHL	69	20	44	64	73	4	1	2	3	6
2003–04	Louisiana IceGators	ECHL	19	3	6	9	16	—	—	—	—	—
2003–04	Texas Wildcatters	ECHL	44	19	22	41	40	—	—	—	—	—
2004–05	Bracknell Bees	BNL	34	19	27	46	20	10	5	5	10	34
2005–06	Sheffield Steelers	EIHL	45	19	16	35	116	8	5	7	12	8
2006–07	Brûleurs de Loups	France	25	21	11	32	22	12	6	1	7	18
2007–08	Brûleurs de Loups	France	24	25	14	39	71	6	2	2	4	16
2008–09	Brûleurs de Loups	France	22	13	8	21	28	11	2	4	6	12
2009–10	Guildford Flames	EPIHL	51	43	34	77	100	4	1	1	2	0
2010–11	Guildford Flames	EPIHL	50	43	25	68	69	4	1	2	3	0
2011–12	Bracknell Bees	EPIHL	53	25	49	74	62	—	—	—	—	—
2012–13	Bracknell Bees	EPIHL	43	31	35	66	87	2	0	1	1	2
ECHL totals			526	199	296	495	819	34	15	21	36	60

== Awards ==
- Kelly Cup winner, 2001-02 (Greenville Grrrowl)
- Winter Cup winner, 2004-05 (Bracknell Bees)
- Magnus Cup winner, 2006-07 (Brûleurs de Loups)
- Magnus Cup winner, 2008-09 (Brûleurs de Loups)
- English Cup winner, 2009-10 (Guildford Flames)
- EPIHL Playoff winner, 2010-11 (Guildford Flames)
