= Gary Stefan =

Canadian ice hockey player and coach

- Born: June 23, 1959 (age 67) Brantford, Ontario, Canada
- Height: 6 ft 1 in (185 cm)
- Weight: 195 lb (88 kg; 13 st 13 lb)
- Position: Forward
- Shot: Left
- Played for: Richmond Flyers; Streatham Redskins; Slough Jets
- National team: Great Britain
- Playing career: 1980–1999

Gary Stefan (born June 23, 1959) is a retired ice hockey player and coach. He played for Richmond Flyers in 1980–1981 and Streatham Redskins between 1981 and 1987 before joining Slough Jets, whom he played for until he retired at the end of the 1998–99 season. He also played for the Great Britain national ice hockey team at three world championships in 1990, 1991, and 1992. He was inducted into the British Ice Hockey Hall of Fame in 2000.

Born in Brantford, Ontario, he is the older brother of ex-Detroit Red Wings goaltender Greg Stefan and Joe Stefan, who also played in the UK.
