= Haringey Huskies =

Ice hockey team based in London, England

- City: London, England
- League: NIHL 2 South East Division
- Conference: South
- Division: 2
- Founded: 2017
- Home arena: Alexandra Palace (capacity: 1250)
- Colours: Silver, Black, White
- Owner(s): Lee Mercer
- General manager: Lee Mercer
- Head coach: Stuart Appleby, Matt France, James Pentecost (as player-coaches)
- Captain: Stuart Appleby

The Haringey Huskies are a British ice hockey team based in London, England. The Huskies are members of the NIHL 2 South East Division and play their home games at Alexandra Palace.

== Formation ==
The EIHA announced on 1 June 2017 that the Haringey Racers would no longer be operating a NIHL franchise out of Alexandra Palace, instead a new team, the Haringey Huskies, would be offered the Racers spot in the league.

This announcement was not without controversy as Racers owner David Richards Jnr would claim that the franchise had been stolen from him by the Huskies ownership. The EIHA would later state that this was not the case and that the Racers were unable to compete due to a "breakdown in the relationship between themselves and Alexandra Palace, which includes substantial monies still owed", and as such they approved the Huskies filling the slot left by the Racers. The first player signed to the Huskies was former Racer Stuart Appleby.

The Huskies faced the Basingstoke Buffalo in their maiden game, suffering a 6–3 loss, however, due to the Buffalo fielding an ineligible player, this result was overturned and the Huskies declared the victors. During this game, Ben Osborne scored the first goal in franchise history.

In the 2020 Wilkinson Cup (NIHL South 2) the Huskies came out on top, winning the cup.

== Club roster 2020–21 ==
Netminders
No.	Nat.	Player	Catches	Date of birth	Place of birth	Acquired	Contract
27	(England)	Matthew Brown		2 July 1993 (age 32)	England	2019 from Unattached	20/21
32	(England)	Dan Lane	L	6 June 1994 (age 31)	Peterborough, England	2019 from Peterborough Phantoms	20/21

Defencemen
No.	Nat.	Player	Shoots	Date of birth	Place of birth	Acquired	Contract
4	(England)	Bryn Griffiths	R	13 February 1992 (age 33)	Ashtead, England	2017 from Cardiff Devils ENL	20/21
5	(England)	Jaden Jenner		23 December 2001 (age 24)	England	2017 from Milton Keynes Storm	20/21
7	(Scotland)	Ryan McFarlane	R	18 December 1986 (age 39)	Edinburgh, Scotland	2018 from Dundee Tigers	20/21
14	(England)	Ryan Payne		11 October 1990 (age 35)	Enfield, England	2015 from Unattached	20/21
83	(England)	Tom Avery	R	5 October 1990 (age 35)	London, England	2019 from Bracknell Hornets	20/21
87	(Hungary) (Romania)	Gheorge 'Gyuri' Dragomir	L	9 March 1994 (age 31)	Göd, Hungary	2018 from Unattached	20/21
TBA	(England)	Sam Jackson		5 May 1999 (age 26)	England	2020 from Unattached	20/21
TBA	(England) (Jamaica)	Solomon Smith		21 January 1998 (age 27)		2020 from Blackburn Hawks	Two Way

Forwards
No.	Nat.	Player	Shoots	Date of birth	Place of birth	Acquired	Contract
9	(England)	James Hepburn		11 October 1984 (age 41)	England	2018 from Unattached	20/21
10	(England)	Nick Alley	R	6 March 1990 (age 35)	Homerton, England	2019 from Peterborough Phantoms 2	20/21
15	(England)	Luke Martin		12 September 1991 (age 34)	England	2018 from Slough Jets	20/21
17	(England)	Stuart Appleby		8 February 1990 (age 35)	London, England	2017 from Haringey Racers	20/21
21	(England)	Sam Park		24 August 1988 (age 37)	England	2014 from Unattached	20/21
23	(England)	Stephen Woodford		27 September 1994 (age 31)		2017 from Unattached	20/21
73	(England)	Joseph Willingham		7 February 1993 (age 32)	England	2017 from Guildford Phoenix	20/21
84	(Italy) (Brazil)	Leo Saoncella	L	30 March 2002 (age 23)	Cornélio Procópio, Brazil	2020 from Streatham Hawks	20/21
89	(England)	James Pentecost	R	9 October 1989 (age 36)	Peterborough, England	2019 from Peterborough Phantoms 2	20/21
TBA	(England)	Danny Hughes	R	1 October 1982 (age 43)	Middlesex, England	2020 from Bracknell Hornets/Wasps	20/21

== 2020/21 Outgoing ==
Outgoing
No.	Nat.	Player	Shoots	Date of birth	Place of birth	Leaving For
