= Slough Jets ENL =

Professional ice hockey team in Slough, England

- Slough Jets ENL 2011–12
- Founded: 1986
- History: Slough ENL Jets
- Home arena: The Hangar
- City: Slough, England
- Team colors: Red, White, and Blue
- Owner(s): Slapshot ltd.
- General manager: (United Kingdom) ENL 2 Michelle Lindgren (United Kingdom) ENL 1 Dee Mason
- Head coach: (United Kingdom) ENL 2 Tony Milton (United Kingdom) ENL 1 Adam Greener
- Minor league affiliates: Slough Jets (English National Premier Ice Hockey League)Slough Junior Jets

The Slough ENL Jets is an ice hockey team based in Slough, England. The team was set up for the start of the 2010/11 season, following the folding of the previous ENL team, the Slough Harrier Hawks. The Jets long term intention for the ENL team was to achieve promotion to the ENL League 1, thus enabling a better step up from the juniors all the way to the Slough Jets. Their first Coach was Adam Greener and their star player, Zoran Kozic, formally of Yale University and team Yugoslavia in World Championship games.

== Season by season record ==
Note: GP = Games played, W = Wins, L = Losses, T = Ties, Pts = Points, GF = Goals for, GA = Goals against, PIM = Penalties in minutes

Season	League	GP	W	L	T	PTS	GF	GA
Slough Jets ENL Season 2010–11	ENL League 2 South	24	18	4	2	38	203	81
Slough Jets ENL 2011-12	ENL League 1 South							
Slough Jets ENL 2011-12	ENL League 2 South							

== ENL Jets top point scorers ==
(In all ENL competitions since their inception into the league)

These are the top-ten-point-scorers in franchise history. Figures are updated after each completed ENL regular season.

Note: Pos = Position; GP = Games played; G = Goals; A = Assists; Pts = Points; P/G = Points per game; * = current Jets player

Points
Player	GP	G	A	Pts	P/G
Zoran Kozic	21	54	71	125	5.95
Stas Prokofiev	22	38	39	77	3.50
Jamie Milton	20	25	28	53	2.65
Jamie McIlroy	20	12	8	20	1.00
Matt Jordan	21	1	17	18	0.86
Tom Smith	5	7	5	13	2.60
Stuart Mogg	13	3	6	9	0.69
Sam Shone	24	3	6	9	0.75
Lee Hardy	14	2	3	5	0.36
Carl Thompson	2	2	2	4	2.00

Goals
Player	GP	G
Zoran Kozic	21	54
Stas Prokofiev	22	38
Jamie Milton	20	25
Jamie McIlroy	20	12
Tom Smith	5	7
Stuart Mogg	13	3
Sam Shone	24	3
Lee Hardy	14	2
Carl Thompson	2	2
Matt Jordan	21	1

Assists
Player	GP	A
Zoran Kozic	21	71
Stas Prokofiev	22	39
Jamie Milton	20	28
Matt Jordan	21	17
Jamie McIlroy	20	8
Stuart Mogg	13	6
Sam Shone	24	6
Tom Smith	5	5
Lee Hardy	14	3
Carl Thompson	2	2

== ENL Jets honours ==
- 2010–11
  - ENL League 2 South – CHAMPIONS
