= AEW UK =

- Type: Subsidiary
- Industry: Real estate Private Equity
- Headquarters: London, United Kingdom
- Parent: AEW Capital Management
- Website: www.aewuk.co.uk

AEW UK is a UK-based company providing real estate investments management that is the local subsidiary of US-based AEW Capital Management. AEW UK is a 50:50 joint venture between the AEW UK management team and AEW Global's European operation, AEW Europe.

As of 2016, AEW managed €19.3 bn of real estate assets in Europe.

AEW Europe is a subsidiary of French-based Natixis Global Asset Management (NGAM), the asset management platform of the Natixis group. NGAM is the 14th largest, asset manager in the World and the second largest in France. Natixis' previous investments include Bernie Madoff's notorious Bernard L. Madoff Investment Securities LLC.

== UK funds ==
The UK funds managed by AEW include the AEW UK Core Property Fund, the AEW UK South East Office Fund, the AEW UK Real Return Fund and the Real estate investment trust AEW UK REIT plc.

As of 2016, AEW UK REIT was ranked 21st out of 50 UK listed property related investment funds by total shareholder return by Property Week. The underlying assets in these funds range from a Gala Bingo Hall in Borehamwood, to the Ryde Arena on the Isle of Wight.

== Controversies ==
In October 2016 AEW UK closed Ryde Arena, an ice skating rink on the Isle of Wight which was being run by a local community group, without notice. Children expecting to attend regular hockey and skating practice found themselves locked out of the building. The building remains closed and AEW have not disclosed their plans for the building. Members of the Isle of Wight skating community formed The Ryde Arena Community Action Group which is campaigning to have the building re-opened. The building was listed as an asset of community value in January 2016. Stories highlighting the impact of AEW's actions on children on the Island feature on the Action Group's website.

In June 2016 a planning application submitted by AEW UK for 76 flats in Bournemouth's Beales store was unanimously rejected after a campaign by locals and the owners of Beales backed by Conor Burns MP. The 65 studio and 11 one bedroom flats with no parking which were described by AEW UK as "an environmentally sustainable approach" which "made the best use of the building" were rejected by councillors as "shabby" and "appalling".
