= Lukáš Smítal =

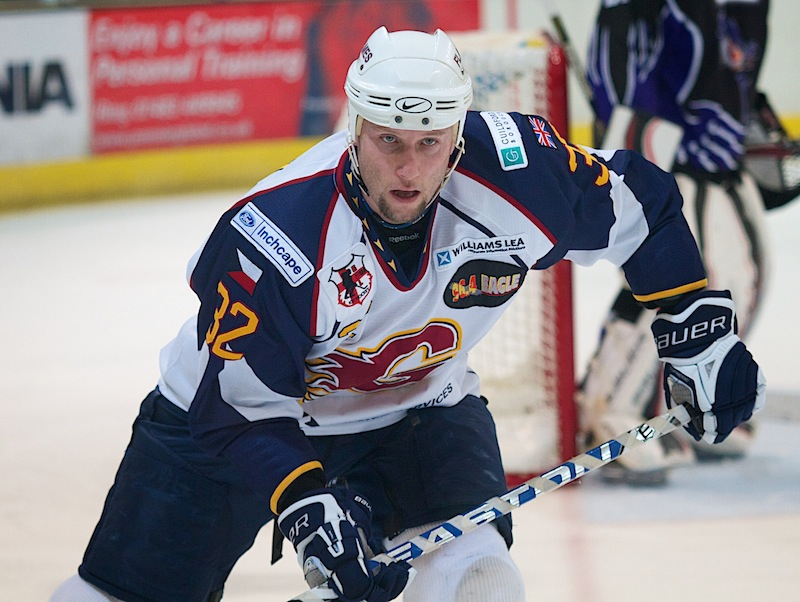
- Born: 15 August 1974 (age 51) Brno, Czechoslovakia
- Height: 6 ft 1 in (185 cm)
- Weight: 210 lb (95 kg; 15 st 0 lb)
- Position: Right wing
- Shoots: Right
- EPIHL team Former teams: Bracknell Bees; Saint John Flames; Cleveland Barons; San Antonio Rampage; Guildford Flames
- NHL draft: Undrafted
- Playing career: 1993–present

Lukáš Smítal (born 15 August 1974) is a Czech professional ice hockey right winger who currently coaches the Slough Jets in the English Premier Ice Hockey League. Smítal rejoined the Bracknell Bees after four seasons with local rival club, the Guildford Flames.

== Playing career ==
=== Amateur ===
Smítal played for the Czech Republic U-20 (under 20 years old) team in 1994, where he scored two points in six games.

=== Professional ===
Smítal spent most of his career (1996–99, 2000–04) in North America playing in the ECHL and the AHL. Smítal holds the record for most goals scored as a member of the former Johnstown Chiefs. Smítal scored 107 goals over two different stints with the Chiefs (1996–99, 2001–03). Smital broke the record formerly held by Bruce Coles, who had scored 106 goals during his time with the Chiefs.

Smital was signed and brought to the UK by the Bracknell Bees hockey team, where he made a formidable partnership with Martin Masa, helping to bring silverware to Bracknell. Smital stayed for 3 seasons before leaving for local rivals Guildford.

Smítal spent the majority of four seasons with the Guildford Flames, leaving the squad shortly before the end of the 2010–11 season. For the 2011–12 season, Smítal rejoined the Bracknell Bees hockey team with longtime teammate Martin Máša. Fellow countryman and current teammate Máša has skated on six different teams with Smítal: 1996-99 Johnstown Chiefs; 1997–98 Saint John Flames; 2000-01 Greensboro Generals; 2003–04 Texas Wildcatters; 2004-05 Bracknell Bees; 2009–2011 Guildford Flames.

Smítal is also the current head coach of the Bracknell Hornets of the ENIHL and is a camp coach at Black And Gold Conditioning Camp, located in Bracknell.

== Awards and honours ==
- Winter Cup winner, 2004–05 Bracknell Bees
- British National League All Star Team, 2004–05
- British Ice Hockey Writer's Association Player of the Year, 2004–05
- English Premier League winner, 2005–06; 2008–09; 2009–10
