= Streatham Hawks =

Ice hockey team in London, England

Streatham Black Hawks
- City: Streatham, London, England
- League: NIHL 2 South Division
- Founded: 2019
- Home arena: Streatham Ice Arena; Capacity: 1200; Ice size: 197ft x 94ft
- Colours: Home: White and Black
- General manager: Rob Corkum
- Head coach: Karl Zimmerman
- Captain: Ryan Burgess; Alt: Daniel Clayton, Joseph Tearall
- Website: https://www.instagram.com/streathamnihl2/

Franchise history
- 2019-2021: Streatham Hawks
- 2021-: Streatham Black Hawks

The Streatham Black Hawks are an amateur ice hockey team based in Streatham, London, England. They currently play in the NIHL 2 South Division. Previously named the Streatham Hawks in the 2019–2020 season, they rebranded as the Black Hawks for the 2021–2022 season. The Streatham Black Hawks are the senior affiliate of the Streatham Youth Ice Hockey Club.

== Season-by-season record ==
Season	League	GP	W	T	L	OTW	OTL	Pts.	Rank	Postseason
2019-2020	NIHL 2	20	4	-	14	0	1	9	5th	Playoffs Cancelled
2021-2022	NIHL 2	22	16	-	5	0	1	33	4th	Quarterfinals loss

== Club roster 2021–22 ==
Netminders
No.	Nat.	Player	Catches	Date of birth	Place of birth	Acquired	Contract
33	(England)	Ruth Cattell	L	1985	Dukinfield, GBR	2021 from Haringey Huskies	21/22
40	(England)	James Richardson	L	1992		2019 from Unattached	21/22
90	(England)	Dylan Phillips	L	2004		2021 from SYIHC	Junior
91	(England)	Dominic Rae	L	2005		2021 from SYIHC	Junior

Defencemen
No.	Nat.	Player	Shoots	Date of birth	Place of birth	Acquired	Contract
19	(France) / (England)	Luc Baillis	R	1997	Paris, FRA	2021 from Unattached	21/22
21	(England)	Oliver Gannon	R	1996		2021 from Unattached	21/22
37	(England)	Joseph Gibson	L	2001		2021 from Lee Valley Lions	21/22
58	(England)	Jack Holland	R	2002		2019 from SYIHC	21/22
3	(England)	Samuel Jackson	L	1999		2021 from Haringey Huskies	21/22
23	(England)	Amy Robery	L	2004		2021 from SYIHC	Junior
41	(England)	Jack Hoppes	R	2005		2021 from SYIHC	Junior
	(England)	Preston Tombs	R	2006		2022 from SYIHC	Junior
13	(Netherlands) / (Hong Kong)	Karl Zimmerman	L	1993	Hong Kong, HKG	2021 from Haringey Huskies	21/22

Forwards
No.	Nat.	Player	Shoots	Date of birth	Place of birth	Acquired	Contract
92	(England)	Harry Blake	L	2000		2021 from Invicta Mustangs	21/22
4	(England)	Ryan Burgess	R	1991	Swindon, GBR	2019 from Unattached	21/22
15	(England)	Daniel Clayton	R	1996	Croydon, GBR	2021 from Invicta Mustangs	21/22
77	(England)	Alec Goldstone	L	2000		2019 from Streatham IHC	21/22
69	(England)	Aston Lacey	R	2005		2021 from SYIHC	Junior
	(Poland) / (England)	Maksymilan Maslak	L	2006		2022 from SYIHC	Junior
8	(England)	Archie Millar	R	2005		2021 from SYIHC	Junior
95	(England)	William Poles	R	1995		2019 from Unattached	21/22
28	(England)	Alister Rae	L	2002	London, GBR	2019 from SYIHC	21/22
24	(England)	Stanley Ratcliffe	R	2004		2021 from SYIHC	Junior
10	(England)	John Spence	R	1993		2021 from Unattached	21/22
	(Canada)	Owen Stevenson	L	2006		2022 from SYIHC	Junior
27	(England)	Joseph Tearall	R	1996	Swindon, GBR	2019 from Unattached	21/22
63	(England)	Isabell Whiteley	R	1993		2019 from Unattached	21/22
76	(England)	Mark Wheeler	R			2021 from Unattached	21/22

== 2020/21 Outgoing ==
Outgoing
No.	Nat.	Player	Shoots	Date of birth	Place of birth	Leaving For
