= Planet Ice Basingstoke =

Multi-purpose arena in Basingstoke, England

Coordinates: 51°15′55″N 1°07′12″W

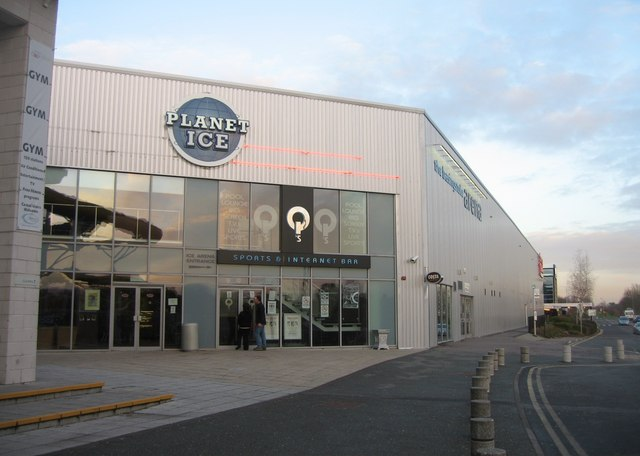
- Interactive map of Planet Ice Basingstoke
- Location: Leisure Park, Basingstoke RG22 6PG
- Owner: The Arena Group Ltd
- Operator: Planet Ice
- Capacity: 2,000

Construction
- Opened: 30 April 1988
- Cost: £2 million
- Architect: Mike Lewis
- General contractor: Framex Building Systems

Tenants
- Basingstoke Bison; Basingstoke Buffalo

Planet Ice Basingstoke (formerly known as Silverdome Arena) is a 2,000-seat multi-purpose arena operated by Planet Ice in Basingstoke, England. It was built in 1988 and has an Olympic sized 60 m × 30 m (197 ft × 98 ft) ice rink. It is one of several ice skating arenas in the UK operated by the Planet Ice company. It is home to the Basingstoke Bison and Basingstoke Buffalo ice hockey teams.

The first ever hockey game played at the ice rink was between Basingstoke Beavers (now Bison) and Bournemouth Sharks, on Sunday 17 July 1988. The Beavers won the game 27-2 in front of 1,200 spectators. The first ever goal was scored by the Beavers' Don Yewchin after just 10 seconds.

== Public Skating ==
Basingstoke Ice Rink has public skating year round, seven days a week. Disco sessions occur every Friday at 20:00 and birthday parties can be booked for the morning and afternoon sessions all week.

== Private Hire ==
Hiring can be done by contacting the rink directly on a case-by-case basis.

== Synchronised Skating ==
The local club Basingstoke Synchronised Skating Club has 3 Synchronised Skating teams using the rink. Including

- Snowstorm
- Ice Angels
- Ice Age

The club is sponsored by Persimmon Homes.

The club in conjunction with the figure skating club has won the National Team Challenge inter-rink competition 3 times in 1999, 2004 and 2009.

== Figure Skating ==
The rink hosts top level figure skaters including 2015/16 national champion Danielle Harrison and has 12 coaches including Andrew Place who competed in the 1992 Olympics. There is patch ice for figure skaters every morning.

The local club is Basingstoke Ice Skating Club.

It has a regular Friday night session.

The club in conjunction with the synchro skating club has won the National Team Challenge inter-rink competition 3 times in 1999, 2004 and 2009.

== Christmas Show ==
The rink has a Christmas show each year with a cast of 190 for the 25th annual show in 2013, and a cast of 180 in 2014.

== Ice Hockey ==
The Planet Ice Basingstoke is home to the Basingstoke Bison and Basingstoke Buffalo with 5 Junior teams and a number of recreational teams including

- Basingstoke Hyenas http://basingstokehyenas.co.uk/
- Basingstoke Raptors https://www.facebook.com/raptorsicehockeyclub/
- Basingstoke Cougars http://www.cougarsihc.co.uk/
- Basingstoke Barracudas https://twitter.com/cudashockey

Along with an active Stick & Puck http://www.sticknpuckbasingstoke.co.uk/

== Medium Term Threat ==
The ice rink is under threat of closure by the operator Planet Ice. There are multiple petitions and an active campaign to maintain the ice rink in Basingstoke.
