= Oxford City Stars =

Ice hockey team in Oxfordshire, England

- City: Oxford, Oxfordshire
- League: NIHL South Division 1
- Conference: Division One South
- Founded: 1984
- Home arena: Oxford Ice Rink; Capacity: 1,025
- Colors: Yellow, Blue & Black
- General manager: Jo Mundy (England)
- Head coach: Mark Saunders (England)
- Captain: Christopher Cooke (England)
- Affiliates: Oxford Rising Stars, NIHL 2 Oxford Midnight Stars, WNIHL 2
- Website: Oxford City Stars

Franchise history
- 1984–1997: Oxford City Stars
- 1997–1998: Oxford Chill
- 1998–2000: Oxford Blades
- 2000–present: Oxford City Stars

The Oxford City Stars are an ice hockey team based in Oxford, Oxfordshire, England.The team was founded in 1984. They currently play in the NIHL South Division 1 at Oxford Ice Rink, Oxford.

== History ==
=== The British Hockey League (1984–1996) ===
The Oxford City Stars made their debut in 1984 and had an instant impact winning the BHL Division 2 (Midlands) as well as the post season playoffs and moved into the BHL Division 1 where they were unable to repeat their success, succumbing to a 9th placed finish in their first season. The following season would see them finish 15th and return to the BHL Division 2. They would however endure more success in the 1990–91 and 1995-96 seasons as they claimed First Place, but nothing in the post season.

=== The Turbulent Years (1996–2000) ===
After the formation of the National Ice Hockey League in 1996, the Oxford City Stars were placed in the Division One South where the finished 6th and failed to qualify for the Playoffs. The following season due to issues with the Ice Rink, they moved to Swindon under the guise of Swindon Chill. The 1998-99 season saw the Stars return under the name of Oxford Blades, losing all 32 games in a dismal season with only worse to come as they folded midway during the 1999-2000 season.

=== ENHL Years (2001–2012) ===
The City Stars returned to the ENHL for the 2000-2001 season and would endure mid range results over the coming years, finishing in highs of 2nd and lows of 9th with one quarter final playoff appearance as the highlight of the performances.

=== NIHL Years (2012–present) ===
The Oxford City Stars found traction in the newly formed National Ice Hockey League where they won the Southern Division 2 Title back to back in 2012-13 and 2013-14 with no Playoffs being played. The Stars struggled the following season in Division 1 garnering just 7 wins from 36 games on their way to a 9th place finish. They picked up the following year finishing 4th and losing in the Quarter Finals of the Playoffs. The Stars would then return to Division 2 for the next 3 seasons, picking up One League Title in the 2017-18 season.

=== Covid Pandemic in Ice Hockey (2019–2021) ===
In late 2019/early 2020 the World was rocked by the emergence of a respiratory disease across the world eventually dubbed the COVID-19 pandemic, which affected the world in a major way as governments struggled to control the outbreak. The Stars were due to play the Invicta Dynamos but the visiting team cancelled due to a positive test amongst the team. Shortly after this the Government announced that measures would be taken to contain the outbreak including the cancellation of all sporting events as well as other measures. Thus the 2019 Season was incomplete and halted and the post-season was cancelled as well. The outbreak would go on to claim the 2020-21 season too.

=== Returning to Hockey (2021–present) ===
After the culmination of Covid19, the League announced the 2021 season would go ahead as planned. The Stars had moved back into the NIHL South Division 1 at this point and the season would commence with 9 teams due to the closure of the John Nike Leisure Complex, home of the Bracknell Hornets who since folded. The Stars struggled in their return to action, finishing 8th of 9 with just 18 points and an elimination in the Quarter Finals of the Playoffs

== Club roster 2024–25 ==
(*) Denotes a non-British trained player (Import)

Netminders
No.	Nat.	Player	Catches	Date of birth	Place of birth	Acquired	Contract
31	(Wales)	Ross Miller	L	25 July 1995 (age 31)	Penarth, Wales	2019	24/25
33	(Wales)	Morgan Parsons	?	13 July 2004 (age 22)	Wales	2024 from Basingstoke Buffalo	24/25

Defencemen
No.	Nat.	Player	Shoots	Date of birth	Place of birth	Acquired	Contract
4	(England)	Charlie Roche	R	1 January 2006 (age 20)	Oxford, England	2021	23/24
9	(England)	Christopher Cooke	R	13 November 1994 (age 31)	Guildford, England	2021	24/25
91	(England)	Casey Wilson	?	21 September 2002 (age 23)	England	2024 from Streatham Blackhawks	24/5

Forwards
No.	Nat.	Player	Shoots	Date of birth	Place of birth	Acquired	Contract
8	(England)	Jake Williams	R	18 August 2001 (age 25)	Oxford,	2020	24/25
18	(England)	Aidan McGurk	R	14 February 2004 (age 22)	England	2023	24/25
51	(England)	Jack Peacock	R	20 August 2002 (age 24)	England	2024 from Solent Devils	24/25
61	(England)	Will Birch	R	14 January 2002 (age 24)	England	2024 from Basingstoke Buffalo	24/25

Team Staff
No.	Nat.	Name	Acquired	Role	Place of birth	Joined from
	(England)	Mark Saunders	2024	Head coach	Kingston-Upon-Thames, England	Streatham Blackhawks
	(England)	Darren Elliott	2012/13	Assistant coach	Oxford, England
	(England)	Jo Mundy	2018/19	General Manager	England

== Honours ==
- British Division 2 (South) Champions – 1984/85, 1990/91, 1995/96
- British Division 2 Playoff Champions – 1984/85
- National Ice Hockey League, Division 2 (South) Champions – 2012/13, 2017–18
- English National League Runners-up – 2003/04, 2004/05
- English National League Cup Runners-up – 2003/04

National Championship Trophy 2017/18

== Retired jersey numbers ==
- 11 - Paul Linton
- 16 - Alan Green

== Season-by-season record ==
Oxford City Stars season-by-season record

Season	Notes	League	GP	W	L	OTL	PTS	GF	GA	League Pos.	Postseason
1984–85		BHL Division 2 (Midlands)	12	11	0	1	23	164	24	1st	Champions
1985–86		BHL Division 1	22	5	17	2	10	150	229	9th	No playoffs
1986–87		BHL Division 1	30	5	23	2	12	214	346	15th	No playoffs
1987–88		BHL Division 2	26	16	10	0	32	241	154	7th	No playoffs
1988–89		BHL Division 2	28	20	6	2	42	368	225	3rd	No playoffs
1989–90		BHL Division 2	24	11	11	2	24	195	178	4th	Group stage
1990–91		BHL Division 2	28	23	5	0	46	242	111	1st	Group stage
1991–92		BHL Division 2	32	17	13	2	36	284	221	4th	No playoffs
1992–93		BHL Division 2 (Group A)	32	11	20	1	23	234	352	5th	DNQ
1993–94		BHL Division 1 (North)	44	1	41	2	4	222	743	8th	DNQ
1994–95		BHL Division 2 (South)	22	11	9	2	24	148	119	5th	DNQ
1995–96		BHL Division 2 (South)	22	21	1	0	42	215	168	1st	SF Loss
1996–97		English League Division One (South)	22	10	12	0	20	174	114	6th	DNQ
1997–98#	as Oxford Chill	English League Division One (South)								NA	NA
1998–99	as Oxford Blades	English League Premier Division	32	0	32	0	0	100	410	9th	DNQ
1999–00*	as Oxford Blades	English League Premier Division								NA	NA
2000–01		ENHL Southern Conference	14	9	5	0	104	72	18	4th	Group stage
2001–02		ENHL Southern Conference	18	12	6	0	110	75	24	4th	DNQ
2003–04		ENHL Southern Conference	16	12	3	1	132	62	25	2nd	Group stage
2004–05		ENHL Southern Conference	18	13	3	2	123	77	28	2nd	Group stage
2005–06		ENL Southern Conference	20	9	1	10	97	94	19	7th	DNQ
2006–07		ENIHL Southern Conference	22	13	8	1	118	98	27	4th	Group stage
2007–08		ENIHL Southern Conference (Division A)	16	11	4	1	101	57	23	3rd	DNQ
2008–09		ENIHL Division One (South)	28	14	9	5	116	101	33	3rd	QF
2009–10		ENIHL Division One (South)	36	22	13	1	189	133	45	5th	Group stage
2010–11		ENIHL Division One (South)	40	13	22	5	130	176	31	9th	DNQ
2011–12*		ENIHL Division One (South)								NA	NA
2012–13		NIHL Division Two (South)	22	18	3	1	37	148	61	1st	No playoffs
2013–14		NIHL Division Two (South)	22	16	5	1	33	145	60	1st	No playoffs
2014–15		NIHL Division One (South)	36	7	25	4	18	143	230	9th	DNQ
2015–16		NIHL Division One (South)	36	18	14	4	36	154	137	4th	QF Loss
2016–17		NIHL Division Two (South)	28	12	12	4	28	122	114	4th	QF Loss
2017–18		NIHL Division Two (South)	26	23	3	0	46	223	55	1st	SF Loss
2018–19		NIHL Division Two (South)	28	24	4	0	48	177	70	3rd	SF Loss
2019–20	-Covid Pandemic	NIHL Division One (South)	36	12	17	2	26	120	149	7th	Postseason cancelled
2020–21	--Covid Pandemic	NIHL Division One (South)								NA	Season cancelled
2021–22		NIHL Division One (South)	32	9	20	3	18	90	139	8th	QF Loss
2022–23		NIHL Division One (South)	28	11	15	2	24	103	128	7th	QF Loss
2023–24		NIHL Division One (South)	28	5	20	3**	10	67	145	7th	QF Loss
2024–25		NIHL Division One (South)	-	-	-	-	-	-	-	-	-

Note: GP = Games played; W = Wins; L = Losses; T = Ties; PTS = Points; GF = Goals for; GA = Goals against

'*Stars folded midway through the campaign and all of their results were expunged.

'# Oxford Chill were forced to relocate to Swindon just prior to the start of the league campaign due to a major ice plant failure at the rink. After this happened, they were renamed the Swindon Chill.

- Post-season cancelled due to the 2019 Covid Pandemic—2020-21 Season cancelled due to the ongoing Covid Pandemic

  - 1 Tie awarded after no Ice at Milton Keynes

== Season-by-season record (reserve teams) ==
Over the seasons the Stars have periodically iced teams in division as a reserve teams and a season by season list is below:

Oxford reserve teams season-by-season record

Season	Team Name	League	GP	W	L	T	PTS	GF	GA	League Pos.
1985–86	Oxford City Satellites	BHL Division 2 (Midlands)	15	0	15	0	0	27	278	9th
1986–87	Oxford City Satellites	BHL Division 2 (South)	14	5	9	0	10	68	84	6th
1987–88	Oxford City Satellites	English League Division 1 (South)	16	4	11	1	9	76	92	7th
1989–90	Oxford City Satellites	English League Division 1 (Midlands)	14	1	12	1	3	40	121	8th
1989–90	Oxford City Planets	English League Division 2 (Central)	16	4	12	0	8	56	140	4th
1990–91	Oxford City Planets	English League Division 2 (South)	20	18	1	1	37	174	54	1st
1993–94	Oxford City Planets	English League Division 2 (South)	20	6	11	3	15	63	126	9th
2010–11	Oxford City Stars	ENIHL Division 2 (South)	24	12	10	2	26	116	118	6th
2011–12	Oxford City Stars	ENIHL Division 2 (South)	24	6	10	8	20	75	120	9th

Note: GP = Games played; W = Wins; L = Losses; T = Ties; PTS = Points; GF = Goals For; GA = Goals Against

== All-time records ==
All Time Appearances
No.	Nat.	Name	Games played	Period	Years
1	(England)	Darren Elliot	414	1996–2024	20
2	(England)	Andy Cox	323	2001–2022	17
3	(England)	Joe Edwards	318	2007–2023	16
4	(England)	Josh Oliver	314	2009–2024	14
5	(England)	Paul Donohoe +	293	1987–2007	14
6	(England)	Dax Hedges	271	2006–present	17
7	(England)	Trevor Joseph	236	1985–2005	12
8	(England)	Josh Florey	239	2009–2022	11
9	(England)	Darryl Morvan	223	1985–1999	12
10	(Scotland)	Scott Gough	217	1985–2006	11

Top Goalscorers
No.	Nat.	Name	Games played	Goals	Period	Years
1	(United States)	Dan Prachar	194	403	1989–2006	8
2	(Scotland)	Scott Gough	217	310	1985–2006	11
3	(England)	Darren Elliot	414	259	1996–2024	20
4	(England)	Alan Green	209	216	2004–2017	11
5	(United Kingdom)	Derek Flint	178	190	1991–2005	9
6	(England)	Josh Oliver	314	177	2009–2024	14
7	(England)	Joe Edwards	318	170	2007–2023	15
8	(Canada)	Rick Smith	25	150	1998–1999	1
9	(England)	Paul Donohoe +	293	145	1987–2007	14
10	(Canada)	John Gravelle	61	134	1991–1993	2

Top Assists
No.	Nat.	Name	Games Played	Assists	Period	Years
1	(United States)	Dan Prachar	194	334	1989–2006	8
2	(England)	Darren Elliot	414	304	1996–2024	20
3	(Scotland)	Scott Gough	217	261	1985–2006	11
4	(United Kingdom)	Derek Flint	178	219	1991–2005	9
5	(England)	Paul Simpson	105	205	1985–1989	4
6	(England)	Paul Donohoe +	293	190	1987–2007	14
7	(England)	Joe Edwards	318	179	2007–2023	15
8	(England)	Alan Green	209	175	2004–2017	11
9	(England)	Andy Cox	323	155	2001–2022	17
10	(Canada)	Don Jamieson	52	151	1989–1991	2

Most Penalty Minutes
No.	Nat.	Name	Games Played	PIMs	Period	Years
1	(England)	Darren Elliot	408	824	1996–2024	20
2	(England)	Andy Cox	323	823	2001–2022	17
3	(England)	Dax Hedges	267	666	2006–present	16
4	(England)	Alan Green	209	567	2004–2017	11
5	(England)	Trevor Joseph	263	559	1985–2005	12
6	(England)	Darryl Morvan	223	521	1985–1999	12
7	(England)	Josh Florey	239	461	2009–2022	11
8	(England)	Grant Bailey	139	380	1996–2011	6
9	(England)	Joe Edwards	318	371	2007–2023	15
10	(United States)	Dan Prachar	194	353	1989–2006	8

+ Some Data Missing

== Other associated teams ==
The Oxford City ice hockey club also have junior and women's teams as follows:-

- Under 9s (English League South)
- Under 11s (English League South Division 3)
- Under 13s (English League South Division 3)
- Under 15s (English League South Division 3)
- Under 18s (English League South Division 3)
- Under 20s
- Oxford Midnight Stars (Women's League Division 1 South)
- Oxford Rising Stars (NIHL South Division 2)
