= Chelmsford Chieftains =

Ice hockey team from Essex, England

- City: Chelmsford, Essex, England
- League: NIHL
- Division: Division One South
- Founded: 1987
- Home arena: Riverside Ice and Leisure Centre
- Colors: White, amber and black
- Head coach: Ben Clements (England)
- Captain: Ollie Baldock
- Affiliates: Peterborough Phantoms, NIHL National; Chelmsford Warriors, NIHL 2

Franchise history
- 1987 – present: Chelmsford Chieftains

The Chelmsford Chieftains are an English ice hockey team based in Chelmsford, Essex that is currently playing in the NIHL South Division 1. Since the team was founded in 1987, the Chieftains have played their home games at the Riverside Ice and Leisure Centre.

Chelmsford's first ever game at the Riverside Ice and Leisure Centre was a challenge match against Peterborough Titans on Saturday 5 September 1987. The Chieftains won the game 11–4 in front of 300 spectators. Stuart Steeves (Chelmsford) scored the first ever goal at the venue at 2.07 in the first period.

After competing in the English Premier Ice Hockey League for eight seasons between 1998 and 2008 (having been absent from the league from 2000 until 2002), the Chelmsford Chieftains withdrew from the league at the end of the 2007/2008 season, and instead entered the English National Ice Hockey League. The hockey governing body in the UK, the EIHA, informed the club that they would be playing in Division 1 for the 2008/2009 season. However, at the league A.G.M., many of the clubs supported a motion to overturn the league's decision and the Chieftains were placed in Division 2. The Chieftains had already assembled a squad capable of playing in Division 1 and at such a late stage, the squad could not be rebuilt. The outcome was that the Chieftains started the season in a very strong position.

In the entire 2008/2009 season, the Chieftains allowed a single point, to the Invicta Mustangs at the start of the season. From then until the end of the season, the Chieftains won every game, with an average score of 8–2.

In 2009/10, they finished fourth in the league.

In the 2010/11 season, the Chieftains contended for top spot. Only in the final few weeks did the Wightlink Raiders cement their place at the top of the table. The Raiders had been the only side the Chieftains had failed to beat during the regular season.

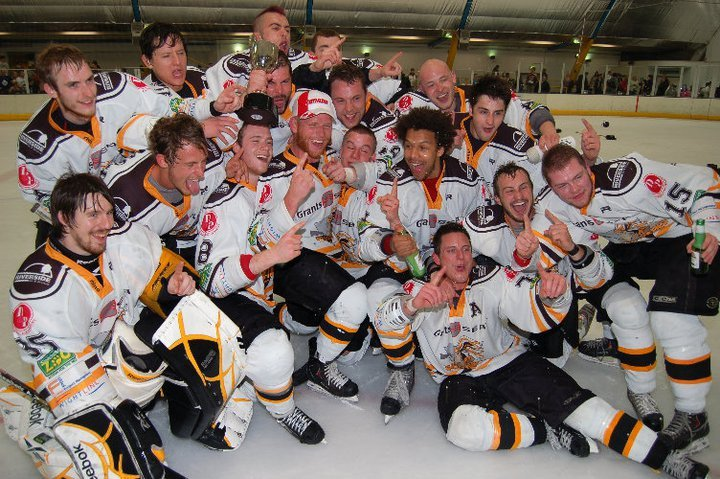
The Chieftains after their ENL1 South play-off win over Wightlink Raiders.

At the conclusion of the 2010/11 season, Dean Birrell announced he would be moving to the role of Director of Coaching in Chelmsford, which would oversee the coaching of the Chieftains and Warriors. Taking his place would be MK Lightning forward Gary Clarke, who takes over in a player-coach role for the 2011-12 campaign.

== Trophies ==
1989 Essex Cup
1990/91 Autumn Trophy
1992/93 British League Entry Playoffs
1996/97 Essex/Kent Cup
1996/97 Essex Cup
1999/00 English League Premier Division Playoffs
1999/00 Data Vision Millenium Cup
1999/00 English League Premier Division
2008/09 English National League South Division 2
2010/11 English National League South Division 1 Playoffs
2011/12 English National League South Division 1 Playoffs
2011/12 Essex Cup
2012/13 National Ice Hockey League South Division 1
2012/13 National Ice Hockey League South Division 1 Playoffs
2013/14 National Ice Hockey League South Division 1
2014/15 National Ice Hockey League South Division 1
2018/19 National Ice Hockey League South Division 2

== Runners up in major competitions excluding league ==
1996/97 Playoff finalists
1997/98 Playoff finalists
1995/96 Autumn Trophy Finalists
2010/11 English National League South Division 1
2011/12 English National League South Division 1
2012/13 National Ice Hockey League South Cup
2012/13 South East Cup

2017/18 National Ice Hockey League South Division 2

== League history ==
Season	Name of League	Final position	# of teams	Played	Won	Lost	Drawn	OT Win	OT Loss	Goals For	Goals Against	Goal Difference	Points
1987/88	British League Div 2	2nd	14	26	19	6	1	0	0	201	107	94	39
1988/89	English First Div	5th	8	28	10	15	3	0	0	148	153	-5	23
1989/90	English First Div	3rd	7	24	15	6	3	0	0	222	140	82	33
1990/91	English First Div	3rd	8	28	17	9	2	0	0	269	213	56	36
1991/92	English First Div	8th	9	32	15	14	3	0	0	277	276	1	33
1992/93	English League Conference B	2nd	6	32	22	7	3	0	0	357	168	189	47
1993/94	British League Div 1 South	8th	8	44	10	32	2	0	0	260	374	-114	22
1994/95	British League Div 1	10th	12	44	10	30	4	0	0	274	404	-130	24
1995/96	British League Div 1	10th	14	52	16	31	5	0	0	267	377	-110	37
1996/97	English League Div 1 South	2nd	12	22	18	3	1	0	0	175	51	124	37
1997/98	English League Div 1 South	2nd	11	20	16	3	1	0	0	187	69	118	33
1998/99	English League Prem Div	4th	9	32	14	14	4	0	0	195	181	14	32
1999/00	English League Prem Div	1st	5	24	19	4	1	0	0	138	85	53	39
2000/01	English National Prem League	2nd	9	32	23	7	2	0	0	203	106	97	48
2001/02	English National League South	5th	10	18	10	5	3	0	0	100	72	28	23
2002/03	English National Prem League	5th	12	42	24	12	6	0	0	245	170	75	54
2003/04	English Premier Ice Hockey League	4th	9	32	18	11	3	0	0	211	149	62	39
2004/05	English Premier Ice Hockey League	7th	9	32	10	14	8	0	0	128	130	-2	28
2005/06	English Premier Ice Hockey League	11th	13	48	10	33	5	0	0	149	284	-135	25
2006/07	English Premier Ice Hockey League	8th	12	44	20	21	3	0	0	194	184	10	43
2007/08	English Premier Ice Hockey League	9th	11	40	12	24	0	1	3	151	189	-38	29
2008/09	English National League Two South	1st	9	32	31	0	1	0	0	282	67	215	63
2009/10	English National League One South	4th	10	36	23	6	7	0	0	213	89	124	52
2010/11	English National League One South	2nd	11	40	28	4	8	0	0	253	101	152	64
2011/12	English National League One South	2nd	10	36	30	6	0	?	?	251	89	162	60
2012/13	English National League One South	1st	9	32	25	5	2	?	?	189	73	116	52
2013/14	English National League One South	1st	9	32	26	3	3	?	?	185	60	125	55
2014/15	English National League One South	1st	10	36	26	5	5	?	?	163	79	84	57
2017/18	National Ice Hockey League South Division 2	4th	14	26	20	6	0	0	0	186	74	112	40
2018/19	National Ice Hockey League South Division 2	4th	15	28	21	5	0	1	1	206	77	129	46

== Club roster 2022-23 ==
(*) Denotes a Non-British Trained player (Import)

Netminders
No.	Nat.	Player	Catches	Date of birth	Place of birth	Acquired	Contract
35	(England)	Luca Tessadri	L	10 February 2005 (age 21)	Basildon, England	2021 from Raiders U18	U18 Junior
39	(Czech Republic)	Petr Čech	R	20 May 1982 (age 44)	Plzeň, Czech Republic	2022 from Guildford Phoenix	22/23
44	(England)	Sonny Phillips	L	27 April 1997 (age 29)	Hornchurch, England	2014 from Chelmsford Warriors	22/23

Defencemen
No.	Nat.	Player	Shoots	Date of birth	Place of birth	Acquired	Contract
12	(England)	Jaden Boolkah		1 October 2003 (age 23)	England	2019 from Chelmsford U18	22/23
36	(England)	Callum Burnett	R	19 January 2001 (age 25)	England	2022 from Raiders IHC	22/23
4	(England)	Neil Liddiard	R	7 May 1978 (age 48)	Swindon, England	2022 from Swindon Wildcats	22/23
47	(England)	Daniel Fay		4 March 2000 (age 26)	England	2022 from Raiders IHC	22/23
93	(England)	Daniel Hitchings	R	18 February 2002 (age 24)	England	2022 from Raiders 2	22/23
91	(England)	Casey Wilson		2002 (age 20)	England	2022 from Raiders 2	22/23
40	(England)	Archie Salisbury	L	8 August 2006 (age 20)	England	2022 from Peterborough Phantoms	Two-Way

Forwards
No.	Nat.	Player	Shoots	Date of birth	Place of birth	Acquired	Contract
3	(England)	T.J. Fillery	R	18 May 1996 (age 30)	Harold Wood, England	2017 from Chelmsford Warriors	22/23
8	(England)	Cameron Bartlett	R	22 November 1993 (age 32)	Romford, England	2018 from Invicta Dynamos	22/23
9	(England)	Grant Bartlett	R	22 November 1993 (age 32)	Romford, England	2018 from Invicta Dynamos	22/23
10	(Scotland)	Kieran Raynor	R	23 March 1998 (age 28)	Glasgow, Scotland	2021 from Peterborough Phantoms 2	22/23
11	(Ukraine)	'Sasha' Maltsev*	R	26 November 2004 (age 21)	Pyriatyn, Ukraine	2022 from MHK Sokil U20	22/23
14	(England)	Bailey Chittock	R	20 June 1997 (age 29)	Chelmsford, England	2021 from Raiders 2	22/23
15	(England)	Justin Dennison		2006 (age 16)	England	2022 from Peterborough Phantoms 2	Two-Way
16	(England)	Leo Markey		2004 (age 18)	England	2022 from Peterborough Phantoms 2	Two-Way
17	(England)	Harry Harcup		17 January 2000 (age 26)	England	2022 from Slough Jets	22/23
20	(England)	Ross Clark	R	16 April 2002 (age 24)	Peterborough, England	2022 from Raiders IHC	22/23
24	(England)	Ollie Baldock	R	15 January 1998 (age 28)	Chelmsford, England	2022 from Raiders IHC	22/23
	(England)	Mason Webster	R	6 August 1994 (age 32)	Basildon, England	2022 from Invicta Dynamos	22/23
	(England)	Brandon Webster		26 May 2000 (age 26)	Basildon, England	2022 from Invicta Dynamos	22/23
74	(England)	Chris Beckett	R	17 March 2005 (age 21)	Basildon, England	2021 from Chelmsford U18	U18 Junior
89	(England)	James Pentecost	R	9 October 1989 (age 37)	Peterborough, England	2021 from Haringey Huskies	22/23

Team Staff
No.	Nat.	Name	Acquired	Role	Place of birth	Joined from
	(England)	Mark Saunders	2022/23	Head coach	Kingston upon Thames, England	Raiders 2, NIHL 1
	(England)	Neil Liddiard	2022/23	Player-Assistant Coach	Swindon, England	Swindon Wildcats, NIHL National

== 2021/22 Outgoing ==
Outgoing
No.	Nat.	Player	Shoots	Date of birth	Place of birth	Leaving For
11	(England)	Darren Brown	R	2 August 1988 (age 38)	Chelmsford, England	Retired
17	(Slovakia)	Stanislav Lascek	L	17 January 1986 (age 40)	Martin, Slovakia	Invicta Dynamos, NIHL 1
21	(England)	Andrew Munroe	R	2 August 1982 (age 44)	Ashington, England	Retired
26	(England)	Julian Smith	R	6 February 1987 (age 39)	Peterborough, England	Retired
43	(Scotland)	Ethan Reid	R	3 June 2002 (age 24)	Scotland	Raiders IHC, NIHL National
88	(England)	Matt Turner	R	18 November 1988 (age 37)	Romford, England	Retired
91	(England)	James Ayling	L	15 May 1992 (age 34)	Chelmsford, England	Retired
