= Kelowna Spartans =

- City: Kelowna, British Columbia, Canada
- League: British Columbia Hockey League
- Operated: 1985–1995
- Home arena: Kelowna Memorial Arena
- Colours: Red, Black, and White

The Kelowna Spartans were a Junior "A" ice hockey team from Kelowna, British Columbia, Canada. They were a part of the British Columbia Hockey League.

Kelowna Packers 1985 - 1989
Kelowna Spartans 1989 - 1995

== History ==
The Kelowna Packers joined the BCJHL in 1985 to fill the void left by the Kelowna Buckaroos who left Kelowna, British Columbia in 1983. They changed their names to the Spartans in 1989.

In 1993, the Spartans won the BCJHL title, and moved on to the Mowat Cup for the British Columbia title and defeated the Williams Lake Mustangs of the Rocky Mountain Junior Hockey League 3-games-to-none. They faced the Olds Grizzlys of the Alberta Junior Hockey League, winning the Doyle Cup 4-games-to-1 to earn a berth to the Centennial Cup.

At the Centennial Cup 1993, the Spartans first defeated the Chateauguay Elites of the Quebec Junior AAA Hockey League 8-3. In game two, they defeated the Antigonish Bulldogs of the Maritime Junior A Hockey League 10-4. In game three, they beat the host Amherst Ramblers, also of the MJAHL, 5-2. In the final game of the round robin, they beat the Flin Flon Bombers of the Saskatchewan Junior Hockey League 4-3, to finish the round perfect and won the Abbott Cup. In the semi-final, the Spartans beat the Bulldogs again, 4-1, to earn a berth into the Final. They won that final 7-2 against the Quebec Champions of the LHJAAAQ to win their only National Title.

In 1994, the Spartans again won the league again. At the Mowat Cup, the Spartans beat the RMJHL representatives, the Kimberley Dynamiters, 3-games-to-0. In the Doyle Cup, for the second straight year they played the Olds Grizzlys but lost this time 4-games-to-2.

Even though they lost to Olds, they were automatically given a berth in the 1994 Centennial Cup as Olds was the host team. They started it off with a 5-2 victory over the SJHL's Weyburn Red Wings. In game two, Kelowna beat the Antigonish Bulldogs 5-4. The third game put them up again against Olds, but again losing to them 5-2. In game four, the Spartans beat the Chateauguay Elites 9-6 to clinch second place in the Round Robin. In the semi-final, they again faced the Elites and beat them 3-1 to earn a berth to the Final. The final was against the Grizzlies and the Spartans pushed them to the brink. In the end, the Grizzlies came out on top in overtime, winning 5-4.

In 1995, the Spartans disbanded to make room for the Kelowna Rockets' Western Hockey League team.

== Season-by-season record ==
Note: GP = Games Played, W = Wins, L = Losses, T = Ties, OTL = Overtime Losses, GF = Goals for, GA = Goals against

Season	GP	W	L	T	OTL	GF	GA	Points	Finish	Playoffs
1985-86	52	40	12	0	-	381	239	80	2nd BCJHL Interior	Lost semi-final
1986-87	52	45	5	2	-	396	177	92	1st BCJHL Interior	Lost final
1987-88	52	28	22	2	-	286	224	58	2nd BCJHL Interior	Lost quarter-final
1988-89	60	24	34	2	-	277	297	50	4th BCJHL Interior	Lost quarter-final
1989-90	57	25	29	3	-	243	248	53	2nd BCJHL Interior	Lost semi-final round robin
1990-91	60	38	18	4	-	297	248	80	2nd BCJHL Interior	Lost quarter-final
1991-92	60	41	18	1	-	302	251	83	1st BCJHL Interior	Lost quarter-final
1992-93	60	46	12	2	-	348	209	94	1st BCJHL Interior	Won League, won Mowat Cup, won Doyle Cup, Won Abbott Cup, won Centennial Cup
1993-94	60	44	10	6	-	364	234	94	1st BCJHL Interior	Won League, won Mowat Cup
1994-95	60	40	15	5	-	333	216	85	2nd BCJHL Interior	Lost semi-final

== Notable alumni ==
- Greg Andrusak
- Jan Bulis
- Willie Mitchell
- Bill Muckalt
- Jason Ruff
- Joel Savage

== See also ==
- List of ice hockey teams in British Columbia

Preceded by Thunder Bay Flyers	Centennial Cup Champions; 1993	Succeeded by Olds Grizzlys
