= Planet Ice =

Ice rink operator in the UK

- Industry: Sports Leisure & Entertainment
- Founder: Andreas Gregorious & Mike Petrouis
- Headquarters: Lichfield, United Kingdom
- Number of locations: 14
- Area served: United Kingdom
- Key people: Heath Rhodes (COO)
- Website: planet-ice.co.uk

Planet Ice is a chain of ice rinks in the United Kingdom (UK). The company has historically had a working relationship with the English Ice Hockey Association (EIHA) and several Planet Ice facilities have served as home ice to EIHA teams.

== Arenas ==
There are currently fourteen Planet Ice Arenas in operation in the UK:

- Planet Ice Altrincham in Altrincham, Greater Manchester
- Planet Ice Basingstoke in Basingstoke, Hampshire
- Planet Ice Blackburn in Blackburn, Lancashire
- Planet Ice Bristol at Cribbs Causeway in Bristol
- Planet Ice Coventry in Coventry, West Midlands
- Planet Ice Gillingham in Gillingham, Kent
- Planet Ice Gosport in Gosport, Hampshire
- Planet Ice Hemel Hempstead in Hemel Hempstead, Hertfordshire
- Planet Ice Leeds in Leeds, West Yorkshire
- Planet Ice Milton Keynes in Milton Keynes, Buckinghamshire
- Planet Ice Peterborough in Peterborough, Cambridgeshire
- Planet Ice Solihull in Solihull, West Midlands
- Planet Ice Uttoxeter in Uttoxeter, Staffordshire
- Planet Ice Widnes in Widnes, Cheshire

== Former Arenas ==
Planet Ice Birmingham in Birmingham, West Midlands, closed in 2003 following a fire. The building was reopened in late 2009 by a subsidiary company of Arena Group under the name of The Leisurebox. This venture was unsuccessful and the rink closed again in May 2014.

Planet Ice operated Ryde Arena as “Planet Ice Isle of Wight” in Ryde, Isle of Wight from February 2001 to March 2015.

Until March 2022 Planet Ice also operated a rink in Cannock, Staffordshire. This rink was closed due to non-renewal of the lease.

== Future ==
Heath Rhodes, the Chief Operations Officer, advised on 8 May 2019, that Planet Ice would be reviewing its future relationship with all EIHL teams operating from its buildings because the Milton Keynes consortium licence was rejected for the 2019–20 EIHL season.
