= Romford Raiders =

British ice hockey team

Raiders IHC
- City: Romford
- League: NIHL
- Division: National League
- Founded: 1987
- Home arena: Sapphire Ice and Leisure Centre
- Colours: White, Gold and Blue
- Affiliates: Romford Buccaneers, NIHL 1
- Website: Romford Raiders

Franchise history
- 1987 – 2013: Romford Raiders
- 2013 – 2018: London Raiders
- 2018 – 2023: Raiders
- 2024 – present: Romford Raiders

Raiders IHC is an ice hockey team based in Romford, participating in the National Division of the National Ice Hockey League (NIHL), the second tier of British ice hockey.

They were known as the Romford Raiders when they were based at the Romford Ice Arena in the London Borough of Havering. They were founder members of the English Premier Ice Hockey League but have competed in the NIHL since 2012. Their development team was the Romford Spitfires, which played in Division 2 of the NIHL before being succeeded in 2009/10 by the Romford Fury.

The team moved to Leyton, East London, in 2013, when it adopted the new name London Raiders. Its team colours are white, gold, and blue, and fans of the team are known as the Gold and Blue Army. The team returned to Romford in 2018, keeping the Raiders name until 2024 when they reverted to Romford Raiders under former owner John Scott.

== History ==
A version of the Raiders crest used from 2013 to 2018

The club was founded in 1987 under the name Romford Raiders and coached by Gord Jeffrey, who went on to become a hero amongst the Romford fans.

Some of the best-known players to play for the Raiders include Rob Stewart, Dave Whistle and Mike Ellis, all of whom went on to play and coach at the highest levels in the UK.

The Raiders' first-ever match was played on Sunday 13 September 1987, against the Oxford City Stars. Romford's first captain, Erskine Douglas, also scored the Raiders' first-ever goal.

On 28 November 2010, during an English National League game against the Bracknell Hornets, Danny Marshall scored his 1,232nd point as a Raider when he assisted on a short-handed goal by Frankie Harvey. With that point, Marshall became the club's all-time leading scorer, surpassing Gord Jeffrey's long-standing record.

In 2013, the Romford Ice Arena was sold by Havering Council to investors. The team subsequently had to move to Lee Valley Ice Centre and became the London Raiders.

On February 3, 2018, the Raiders played their first game at their new home back in Romford, the Sapphire Ice and Leisure Centre. Raiders would come back to win 5–2 against the Cardiff Fire in front of a sell-out crowd. Former Romford Junior Olegs Lascenko scored the team's first-ever goal at the new venue, however, it was Cardiff's Jackson Price who scored the first goal overall. In 2024, the team came under new ownership and returned to using the name Romford Raiders.

== Season Records ==
The following list details the Raiders' finishes in the league and notes any playoff success.

=== League ===
| SEASON | LEAGUE | P | W | T | L | OTW | OTL | F | A | Pt | RANK | POSTSEASON |
| 1987 - 1988 | Heineken League Division 2 | 26 | 25 | 1 | 0 | - | - | 379 | 213 | 51 | Champion | Promoted |
| 1988 - 1989 | Heineken League Division 1 | 24 | 6 | 2 | 16 | - | - | 145 | 201 | 14 | 11 | Relegated |
| 1989 - 1990 | Heineken League Division 2 | 24 | 17 | 1 | 6 | - | - | 217 | 152 | 35 | 2 | Promoted |
| 1990 - 1991 | Division 1 | 40 | 23 | 2 | 15 | - | - | 293 | 245 | 48 | 4 | Qualification loss |
| 1991 - 1992 | Division 1 | 36 | 15 | 5 | 16 | - | - | 262 | 256 | 35 | 6 | Qualification |
| 1992 - 1993 | Division 1 | 32 | 12 | 4 | 16 | - | - | 221 | 239 | 28 | 5 | - |
| 1993 - 1994 | Division 1 South | 44 | 27 | 5 | 12 | - | - | 328 | 235 | 59 | 2 | |
| 1994 - 1995 | Division 1 South | - | - | - | - | - | - | - | - | - | - | - |
| 1995 - 1996 | Division 2 South | 22 | 16 | 0 | 6 | - | - | 178 | 75 | 32 | 3 | Final group South |
| 1996 - 1997 | English League South | 22 | 20 | 1 | 1 | - | - | 192 | 46 | 41 | 1 | Qualification South |
| 1997 - 1998 | English League South | 20 | 11 | 3 | 6 | - | - | 195 | 88 | 25 | 5 | Championship Round South |
| 1998 - 1999 | English Premier League | 32 | 12 | 3 | 17 | - | - | 155 | 168 | 27 | 8 | Did not make playoffs |
| 1999 - 2000 | English Premier League | 24 | 5 | 2 | 17 | - | - | 78 | 127 | 12 | 5 | Did not make playoffs |
| 2000 - 2001 | English Premier League | 32 | 21 | 2 | 9 | - | - | 174 | 106 | 44 | 4 | Champion |
| 2001 - 2002 | English Premier League | 28 | 18 | 2 | 8 | - | - | 169 | 79 | 38 | 4 | Qualification |
| 2002 - 2003 | English Premier League | 42 | 19 | 6 | 17 | - | - | 218 | 199 | 44 | 8 | Qualification |
| 2003 - 2004 | English Premier League | 32 | 21 | 2 | 9 | - | - | 198 | 131 | 44 | 3 | Qualification |
| 2004 - 2005 | English Premier League | 32 | 17 | 2 | 13 | - | - | 144 | 113 | 36 | 4 | Semifinal loss |
| 2005 - 2006 | English Premier League | 48 | 24 | 5 | 19 | - | - | 214 | 204 | 53 | 7 | Qualification |
| 2006 - 2007 | English Premier League | 44 | 14 | 4 | 25 | - | 1 | 175 | 234 | 33 | 9 | Did not make playoffs |
| 2007 - 2008 | English Premier League | 40 | 16 | - | 20 | 1 | 3 | 137 | 176 | 37 | 8 | Qualification |
| 2008 - 2009 | English Premier League | 54 | 22 | - | 24 | 5 | 3 | 197 | 259 | 57 | 6 | Quarterfinal loss |
| 2009 - 2010 | English Premier League | 54 | 5 | - | 46 | 1 | 2 | 147 | 370 | 14 | 10 | Did not make playoffs |
| 2010 - 2011 | English National League South Division 1 | 40 | 29 | 5 | 6 | - | - | 244 | 101 | 63 | 3 | Conference SF loss South 1 |
| 2011 - 2012 | English National League South Division 1 | 36 | 31 | 0 | 5 | - | - | 235 | 93 | 62 | Champion | Conference Final loss South 1 |
| 2012 - 2013 | NIHL South Division 1 | 32 | 22 | 2 | 8 | - | - | 205 | 115 | 46 | 3 | Semifinal loss South |
| 2013 - 2014 | NIHL South Division 1 | 32 | 17 | 3 | 12 | - | - | 142 | 128 | 37 | 4 | Quarterfinal loss South |
| 2014 - 2015 | NIHL South Division 1 | 36 | 9 | 3 | 24 | - | - | 120 | 191 | 21 | 8 | Semifinal loss South |
| 2015 - 2016 | NIHL South Division 1 | 36 | 11 | 2 | 23 | - | - | 135 | 174 | 24 | 8 | Quarterfinal loss South |
| 2016 - 2017 | NIHL South Division 1 | 28 | 11 | 4 | 13 | - | - | 92 | 105 | 26 | 5 | Semifinal loss South |
| 2017 - 2018 | NIHL South Division 1 | 32 | 16- | - | 13 | 2 | 1 | 121 | 106 | 37 | 4 | Conference SF loss |

=== Cups ===
| SEASON | LEAGUE | P | W | T | L | OTW | OTL | F | A | Pt | RANK | POSTSEASON |
| 1988 - 1989 | Autumn Trophy | 6 | 2 | 1 | 3 | - | - | 43 | 62 | 5 | 3 | Did not make playoffs South & East |
| 1989 - 1990 | Autumn Trophy | 4 | 1 | 0 | 3 | - | - | 33 | 38 | 2 | 3 | Did not make playoffs South East |
| 1990 - 1991 | Autumn Cup | 8 | 1 | 0 | 7 | - | - | 45 | 70 | 2 | 5 | Did not make playoffs Group C |
| 1991 - 1992 | Autumn Cup | 8 | 2 | 0 | 6 | - | - | 38 | 66 | 4 | 5 | Did not make playoffs Group C |
| 1992 - 1993 | B&H Cup | 6 | 1 | 0 | 5 | - | - | 34 | 63 | 2 | 4 | Did not make playoffs Group B |

== Club roster 2022-23 ==
(*) Denotes a Non-British Trained player (Import)

Netminders
| No. | Nat. | Player | Catches | Date of birth | Place of birth | Acquired | Contract |
| 32 | (England) | Bradley Windebank | L | 24 July 2002 (age 24) | Harold Wood, England | 2018 from Chelmsford Mohawks | 22/23 |
| 35 | (England) | Ben Clements | L | 21 July 1987 (age 39) | Chelmsford, England | 2022 from Invicta Dynamos | 22/23 |
| 39 | (England) | Ethan James | L | 18 March 1999 (age 27) | London, England | 2019 from Essa Stallions | 22/23 |

Defencemen
| No. | Nat. | Player | Shoots | Date of birth | Place of birth | Acquired | Contract |
| 3 | (England) | Elliott Dewey | R | 10 March 1997 (age 29) | Basingstoke, England | 2022 from Basingstoke Bison | 22/23 |
| 11 | (England) | Tom Relf 'A' | R | 24 February 1998 (age 28) | Frimley, England | 2021 from Sheffield Steeldogs | 22/23 |
| 13 | (England) | Daniel Scott 'A' | R | 30 April 1992 (age 34) | Chatham, England | 2018 from Basingstoke Bison | 22/23 |
| 14 | (England) | Jack Cooper | R | 3 July 1996 (age 30) | London, England | 2014 from Harringay Racers | 22/23 |
| 21 | (England) | Callum Wells | R | 18 April 1998 (age 28) | Harold Hill, England | 2017 from Chelmsford Chieftains | 22/23 |
| 43 | (Scotland) | Ethan Reid | R | 3 June 2002 (age 24) | Scotland | 2022 from Chelmsford Chieftains | 22/23 |
| 55 | (England) | Sean Barry | R | 20 March 1994 (age 32) | Chelmsford, England | 2017 from Chelmsford Chieftains | 22/23 |
| | (England) | Marco Pascale | R | 2003 (age 19) | England | 2022 from Raiders IHC 2 | Two-Way |

Forwards
| No. | Nat. | Player | Shoots | Date of birth | Place of birth | Acquired | Contract |
| 10 | (England) | Brandon Ayliffe | R | 25 June 1998 (age 28) | Harold Wood, England | 2017 from Chelmsford Chieftains | 22/23 |
| 12 | (England) | Mikey Power | R | 20 June 2000 (age 26) | London, England | 2022 from MK Lightning | 22/23 |
| 19 | (England) | Harry Gulliver | R | 14 September 1999 (age 27) | Essex, England | 2022 from Manchester Storm | 22/23 |
| 29 | (England) | Jake Sylvester | L | 21 October 1997 (age 28) | Chelmsford, England | 2017 from Chelmsford Chieftains | 22/23 |
| 51 | (Slovakia) | Erik Piatak* | R | 6 March 1986 (age 40) | Kežmarok, Czechoslovakia | 2019 from DEAC | 22/23 |
| 57 | (England) | Ashley Jackson | L | 27 August 1987 (age 39) | Tunbridge Wells, England | 2022 from Invicta Dynamos | 22/23 |
| 63 | (England) | Aaron Connolly 'C' | L | 1 June 1993 (age 33) | Northfleet, England | 2018 from Basingstoke Bison | 22/23 |
| 86 | (England) | Tommy Huggett | R | 13 July 2002 (age 24) | England | 2018 from Chelmsford Mohawks | 22/23 |
| 89 | (United Kingdom) (Slovakia) | Blaho Novak | L | 21 March 1993 (age 33) | Bratislava, Slovakia | 2022 from Unattached | 22/23 |
| 95 | (England) | Jacob Ranson | R | 9 August 1995 (age 31) | Romford, England | 2019 from Streatham IHC | 22/23 |
| 98 | (England) | Tjay Anderson | L | 30 November 2004 (age 21) | England | 2021 from Raiders U18 | Two-Way |
| | (Canada) (United Kingdom) | Adam Laishram | R | 8 April 1997 (age 29) | Ashburn, ON, Canada | 2022 from MK Lightning | Cover |
| | (England) | Harvey Briggs | R | 19 June 2003 (age 23) | England | 2021 from Streatham IHC | Two-Way |
| | (England) | Adam Erskine | R | 10 February 2005 (age 21) | England | 2021 from Raiders U18 | Two-Way |
| | (Canada) (Croatia) | Matthieu Gomercic* | L | 21 July 1997 (age 29) | Winnipeg, MB, Canada | 2022 from Atlanta Gladiators | 22/23 |

Team Staff
| No. | Nat. | Name | Position | Acquired | Place of birth | Joined from |
|---|---|---|---|---|---|---|
| | (England) | Sean Easton | Head Coach | 2017 | Chelmsford, England | Chelmsford Chieftains, NIHL 1 |
| 35 | (England) | Ben Clements | Player-Assistant Coach | 2022 | Chelmsford, England |
| 55 | (England) | Sean Barry | Player-Assistant Coach | 2022 | Chelmsford, England |
| | (England) | Erin Rose | Physical Therapist | 2021 | England |

== 2021/22 Outgoing ==
Outgoing
| No. | Nat. | Player | Shoots | Date of birth | Place of birth | Leaving For |
|---|---|---|---|---|---|---|
| 15 | (England) | J.J. Pitchley | R | 28 January 1994 (age 32) | Romford, England | Bees IHC, NIHL |
| 17 | (England) | Rio Grinell Parke | L | 25 February 1999 (age 27) | London, England | MK Lightning, NIHL |
| 24 | (England) | Ollie Baldock | R | 15 January 1998 (age 28) | Chelmsford, England | Chelmsford Chieftains, NIHL 1 |
| 36 | (England) | Callum Burnett | R | 19 January 2001 (age 25) | England | Chelmsford Chieftains, NIHL 1 |
| 91 | (Czech Republic) | Lukas Sladkovsky | L | 10 April 1996 (age 30) | Prague, Czech Republic | Peterborough Phantoms, NIHL |
