= Basingstoke Buffalo =

Ice hockey team in Hampshire, England

- City: Basingstoke, Hampshire
- League: NIHL 2 South West Division
- Conference: Southern
- Division: 2
- Founded: 1996
- Home arena: Planet Ice Silverdome Arena, Basingstoke; Capacity 2,000
- Colours: Blue, White, Black
- Captain: Neil Leary
- Parent club(s): Basingstoke Bison
- Website: www.basingstokebuffalo.com

The Basingstoke Buffalo is an English ice hockey team from Basingstoke, Hampshire. The team plays in the NIHL 2 South West division, at the Planet Ice Silverdome. The Buffalo is the second senior team in Basingstoke behind the Basingstoke Bison which plays in the NIHL National Division.

== Club roster 2020–21 ==
Netminders
No.	Nat.	Player	Catches	Date of birth	Place of birth	Acquired	Contract

Defencemen
No.	Nat.	Player	Shoots	Date of birth	Place of birth	Acquired	Contract

Forwards
No.	Nat.	Player	Shoots	Date of birth	Place of birth	Acquired	Contract

== 2020/21 Outgoing ==
Outgoing
No.	Nat.	Player	Shoots	Date of birth	Place of birth	Leaving For
9	(England)	Jason Newman	R	9 June 2001 (age 24)	England	Raiders 2
