= Romford Buccaneers =

Ice hockey team in London, England

- City: Romford
- League: NIHL
- Conference: Division One South
- Founded: 2018
- Home arena: Sapphire Ice and Leisure Centre
- Colours: White, Gold and Blue
- Head coach: Jason Buckman (England)
- Affiliates: Raiders IHC, NIHL National
- Website: London Raiders

Franchise history
- 2018 – present: Raiders IHC 2

The Romford Buccaneers are an ice hockey team from Romford, England that compete in the NIHL South 1 Division. They are a minor league affiliate of the Romford Raiders, who play in the NIHL National Division.

== Season-by-season record ==
Season	League	GP	W	T	L	OTW	OTL	Pts.	Rank	Post Season
2019-2020	NIHL 1	36	11	-	21	1	0	24	8	Playoffs Cancelled
2021-2022	NIHL 1	32	11	-	15	3	3	28	7	Semifinal Loss

== Club roster 2022-23 ==
(*) Denotes a Non-British Trained player (Import)

Netminders
No.	Nat.	Player	Catches	Date of birth	Place of birth	Acquired	Contract
	(England)	Dylan Phillips		2005 (age 17)	England	2022 from Streatham Black Hawks	22/23

Defencemen
No.	Nat.	Player	Shoots	Date of birth	Place of birth	Acquired	Contract
	(England)	Donald Campbell		9 July 1998 (age 27)	England	2019 from Chelmsford Chieftains	22/23
	(England)	Steve Dunnage		1995 (age 27)	England	2018	22/23
	(England)	Zion Felician		2004 (age 18)	England	2021 from Raiders U18	22/23
	(England) (Lithuania)	Megas Kanys		2005 (age 17)		2021 from Raiders U18	22/23
	(England)	Nathan Long	R	22 August 1997 (age 28)	Crewe, England	2022 from Peterborough Phantoms	22/23
	(England)	Marco Pascale	R	2003 (age 19)	England	2021 from Raiders U18	Two-Way
	(England)	Ellie Wakeling	L	21 July 2002 (age 23)	Chelmsford, England	2022 from Chelmsford Warriors	Two-Way

Forwards
No.	Nat.	Player	Shoots	Date of birth	Place of birth	Acquired	Contract
	(England)	Tjay Anderson	L	30 November 2004 (age 21)	England	2021 from Raiders U18	Two-Way
	(England)	Harvey Briggs	R	19 June 2003 (age 22)	England	2021 from Streatham U18	Two-Way
	(England)	Ross Clarke	R	16 April 2002 (age 24)	Peterborough, England	2022 from Peterborough Phantoms	22/23
	(England)	Elliott Dervish		17 May 1995 (age 31)	England	2021 from Chelmsford Chieftains	22/23
	(England)	Adam Erskine	R	10 February 2005 (age 21)	England	2021 from Raiders U18	Two-Way
	(England)	Courtney Grant		1994 (age 28)	Chelmsford, England	2020 from Chelmsford Chieftains	22/23
	(Lithuania)	Vilius Krakauskas*	R	3 April 1996 (age 30)	Kretinga, Lithuania	2019	22/23
	(England)	Jordan Liddell	R	24 June 1997 (age 28)	Peterborough, England	2022 from Peterborough Phantoms 2	22/23
	(England)	Luca Pascale		2003 (age 19)	England	2021 from Raiders U18	22/23
	(England) (Bulgaria)	Kaloyan Popov	L	21 April 2005 (age 21)	Sofia, Bulgaria	2021 from Raiders U18	22/23
	(England)	Thomas Wilson		10 March 1994 (age 32)	England	2021 from Chelmsford Chieftains	22/23

Team Staff
No.	Nat.	Name	Acquired	Role	Place of birth	Joined From
	(England)	Jason Buckman	2022/23	Head coach	Peterborough, England	Peterborough Phantoms, NIHL National

== 2021/22 Outgoing ==
Outgoing
No.	Nat.	Player	Shoots	Date of birth	Place of birth	Leaving For
42	(England)	Danny Milton	L	28 July 1993 (age 32)	Ashford, England	Streatham IHC, NIHL 1
51	(England)	Austin ‘Oz’ Osborn	L	3 August 2004 (age 21)	Haywards Heath, England	New York Aviators, USPHL Premier
61	(England)	Dawson ‘Zib’ Osborn	R	3 August 2004 (age 21)	Haywards Heath, England	New York Aviators, USPHL Premier
93	(England)	Daniel Hitchings	R	18 February 2002 (age 24)	England	Chelmsford Chieftains, NIHL 1
