= Bracknell Hornets =

- City: Bracknell, Berkshire, England
- League: NIHL South Division 1
- Founded: 1987
- Home arena: Yet to be announced
- Colors: Yellow & Black
- General manager: Danny Perchard
- Head coach: Danny Hughes & Carl Graham
- Website: Official Hornets site

Franchise history
- 1987 – Present: Bracknell Hornets

The Bracknell Hornets is an ice hockey team from Bracknell, Berkshire, who play in the NIHL South Division 1. In 2009/10 they won the league playoffs.

== History ==
Bracknell have been a part of the ENL since its creation in the 2000/2001 season playing at "The Hive" (the nickname for the John Nike Leisuresport Complex), and traditionally play their home games on Saturdays.

The team is run under the banner of the Bracknell Ice Hockey Club, the Hornets being their senior team with the aim of encouraging junior players to progress through the ranks.

In recent times strong links have been forged with the Bracknell Bees with players on 2 way contracts between the 2 clubs.

== Club roster 2020–21 ==
Netminders
No.	Nat.	Player	Catches	Date of birth	Place of birth	Acquired	Contract

Defencemen
No.	Nat.	Player	Shoots	Date of birth	Place of birth	Acquired	Contract
9	(England)	Christopher Cooke	R	13 November 1994 (age 31)	Guildford, England	2019 from Basingstoke Bison	20/21

Forwards
No.	Nat.	Player	Shoots	Date of birth	Place of birth	Acquired	Contract

== 2020/21 Outgoing ==
Outgoing
No.	Nat.	Player	Shoots	Date of birth	Place of birth	Leaving For
16	(England)	Matt Foord	R	9 September 1981 (age 44)	High Wycombe, England	Invicta Dynamos
22	(Sweden)	David Millner	R	14 March 1992 (age 33)	Östersund, Sweden	Streatham IHC
37	(England)	Danny Hughes	L	1 October 1982 (age 43)	Middlesex, England	Haringey Huskies
78	(England)	Ben Ealey-Newman	L	13 March 1997 (age 28)	Warfield, England	Streatham IHC
95	(England)	Tom Annetts	L	26 June 1987 (age 38)	Reading, England	Raiders 2
