= Coach of the Year Trophy (IHJUK) =

Unofficial English hockey trophy

The Coach of the Year Trophy is an award given by Ice Hockey Journalists UK to the best coach in the Elite League and the English Premier League at the end of each season. In previous seasons it has been awarded to coaches in the British Hockey League's Premier and First Divisions, the Super League and the British National League. The trophy was first awarded in 1985.

== Coach of the Year Trophy winners ==
Season	Coach	Team	League
2012-13	Richard Hartmann	Edinburgh Capitals	EIHL
2012-13	Paul Dixon	Guildford Flames	EPIHL
2011-12	Doug Christiansen	Belfast Giants	EIHL
2011-12	Andre Payette	Sheffield Steeldogs	EPIHL
2010-11	Bruce Richardson	Braehead Clan	EIHL
2010-11	Tony Hand	Manchester Phoenix	EPIHL
2009–10	Doug Christiansen	Edinburgh Capitals	EIHL
2009–10	Peter Russell	Slough Jets	EPIHL
2008–09	David Matsos	Sheffield Steelers	EIHL
2008–09	Colin Patterson	Peterborough Phantoms	EPIHL
2007–08	Paul Thompson	Coventry Blaze	EIHL
2007–08	Paul Dixon	Guildford Flames	EPIHL
2006–07	Paul Thompson	Coventry Blaze	EIHL
2006–07	Neil Abel	Sheffield Scimitars	EPIHL
2005–06	Rob Wilson	Newcastle Vipers	EIHL
2005–06	Stan Marple	Guildford Flames	EPIHL
2004–05	Paul Thompson	Coventry Blaze	EIHL
2004–05	Mike Ellis	Bracknell Bees	BNL
2003–04	Mike Blaisdell	Sheffield Steelers	EIHL
2003–04	Mark Morrison	Fife Flyers	BNL
2002–03	Mike Blaisdell	Sheffield Steelers	ISL
2002–03	Paul Thompson	Coventry Blaze	BNL
2001–02	Dave Whistle	Belfast Giants	ISL
2001–02	Tony Hand	Dundee Stars	BNL
2000–01	Mike Blaisdell	Sheffield Steelers	ISL
2000–01	Paul Thompson	Coventry Blaze	BNL
1999–00	Dave Whistle	Bracknell Bees	ISL
1999–00	Mark Morrison	Fife Flyers	BNL
1998–99	Kurt Kleinendorst	Manchester Storm	ISL
1998–99	Charlie Colon	Slough Jets	BNL
1997–98	Jim Lynch	Ayr Scottish Eagles	ISL
1997–98	Troy Walkington	Peterborough Pirates	BNL
1996–97	Jim Lynch	Ayr Scottish Eagles	ISL
1996–97	Stan Marple	Swindon Ice Lords	Premier League
1996–97	Mark Morrison	Fife Flyers	Northern Premier League
1995–96	Paul Heavey	Cardiff Devils	Premier Division
1995–96	John Lawless	Manchester Storm	Division 1
1994–95	Mike Blaisdell	Nottingham Panthers	Premier Division
1994–95	Martin Shields	Paisley Pirates	Division 1
1993–94	John Lawless	Cardiff Devils	Premier Division
1993–94	Rich Strachan	Milton Keynes Kings	Division 1
1992–93	John Lawless	Cardiff Devils	Premier Division
1992–93	Peter Woods	Basingstoke Beavers	Division 1
1991–92	Paul Smith	Durham Wasps	Premier Division
1991–92	Brian Kanewischer	Fife Flyers	Division 1
1990–91	Rocky Saganiuk	Peterborough Pirates	Premier Division
1990–91	Peter Johnson	Humberside Seahawks	Division 1
1989–90	Brian Kanewischer	Cardiff Devils	Premier Division
1989–90	Paul Ferguson	Slough Jets	Division 1
1988–89	Alex Dampier	Nottingham Panthers	Premier Division
1988–89	Mark Didcott	Richmond Flyers	Division 1
1987–88	Terry Matthews	Whitley Warriors	Premier Division
1987–88	Chuck Taylor	Telford Tigers	Division 1
1986–87	Alex Dampier	Nottingham Panthers	Premier Division
1986–87	Kevin Murphy	Southampton Vikings	Division 1
1985–86	Peter Johnson	Durham Wasps	Premier Division
1985–86	Iain Finlayson	Solihull Barons	Division 1
1984–85	Ron Plumb	Fife Flyers	Premier Division

== See also ==
- Man of Ice Awards
