= List of Coventry Blaze seasons =

This is a list of seasons completed by the Coventry Blaze ice hockey team, presently of the British Elite League.

This list documents the season-by-season records of the Coventry Blaze since their relocation to Coventry from Solihull in 2000 to the present day.

== Key ==
Regular Season Champions	Playoff Champions	Challenge Cup Winners	Second Tier Title Winners

== Seasons ==
Season	League	Tier	Regular season									Postseason (playoffs)	Challenge Cup	Other competitions
Season	League	Tier	Finish	GP	W	L	T	OTL	GF	GA	Pts	Postseason (playoffs)	Challenge Cup	Other competitions
2000–01	British League	2	4th	36	26	9	-	1	215	111	53	Finished third in qualifying group		
2001–02	British League	2	2nd	44	33	9	2	-	227	118	68	Finished first in qualifying group Won in Semi Final, 10-4 (Guildford); Lost in Final, 7-8 (Dundee)		
2002–03	British League	2	1st	36	30	4	1	1	173	69	62	Finished first in qualifying group Won in Semi Final, 2-0 (Guildford); Won BNL Playoffs, 2-0 (Cardiff)	Finished fourth in qualifying group	
2003–04	Elite League	1	3rd	56	29	20	7	0	185	156	65	Finished third in qualifying group	Finished fifth in qualifying group	
2004–05	Elite League	1	1st	50	33	6	6	5	181	104	77	Finished first in qualifying group Won in Semi Final, 3-0 (Sheffield); Won British Championship, 2-1 (Nottingham)	Finished first in qualifying group Won in Semi Final, 5-4 (Nottingham); Won Challenge Cup, 11-5 (Cardiff)	
2005–06	Elite League	1	4th	42	23	12	4	3	150	107	53	Finished third in qualifying group	Finished second in qualifying group Won in Semi Final, 8-7 (Nottingham); Lost in Final, 4-5 (Cardiff)	IIHF Continental Cup, finished second in group stage
2006–07	Elite League	1	1st	54	36	15	-	3	186	129	75	Won in Quarter Final, 5-4 (Newcastle); Lost in Semi Final, 2-3 (Cardiff)	Finished first in qualifying group Won in Semi Final, 6-4 (Manchester); Won Challenge Cup, 9-4 (Sheffield)	
2007–08	Elite League	1	1st	54	41	11	-	2	217	127	84	Won in Quarter Final, 4-2 (Edinburgh); Won in Semi Final, 4-2 (Newcastle); Lost in Final, 0-2 (Sheffield)	Finished third in qualifying group	Lost Charity Shield, 6-7 (Nottingham); Won British Knockout Cup, (Basingstoke); IIHF Continental Cup, finished fourth in group stage
2008–09	Elite League	1	2nd	54	38	14	-	2	228	151	78	Won in Quarter Final, 6-4 (Newcastle); Lost in Semi Final, 2-6 (Nottingham)	Finished second in qualifying group Lost in Semi Final, 5-2 (Belfast)	Won Charity Shield, 5-4 (Sheffield); IIHF Continental Cup, finished second in group stage
2009–10	Elite League	1	1st	56	38	18	-	0	228	174	76	Won in Quarter Final, 6-2 (Hull); Lost in Semi Final, 6-3 (Cardiff)	Finished third in qualifying group	Lost 20/20 Hockey Fest Final, 2-3 (Sheffield)
2010–11	Elite League	1	6th	54	23	27	-	4	198	185	50	Lost in Quarter Final, 4-3 (Belfast)	Finished fourth in qualifying group	Lost Charity Shield, 2-4 (Belfast); IIHF Continental Cup, finished second in group stage
2011–12	Elite League	1	5th	54	32	20	-	2	203	159	66	Lost in Quarter Final, 7-4 (Cardiff)	Finished fourth in qualifying group	
2012–13	Elite League	1	4th	52	24	22	-	6	156	181	54	Won in Quarter Final, 6-5 (Sheffield) Lost in Semi Final, 5-1 (Belfast)	Finished third in qualifying group Lost in Quarter Final, 6-5 (Braehead)	Erhardt Conference, Finished fourth
2013–14	Elite League	1	6th	52	24	22	-	6	168	167	54	Lost in Quarter Final, 9-3 (Sheffield)	Finished fifth in qualifying group	Erhardt Conference, Finished fourth
2014–15	Elite League	1	6th	52	24	25	-	3	127	145	51	Won in Quarter Final, 5-4 (Nottingham) Won in Semi Final, 3-2 (Belfast); Won British Championship, 4-2 (Sheffield)	Finished fourth in qualifying group Won in Quarter Final, 5-4 (Braehead) Lost in Semi Final, 9-4 (Cardiff)	Erhardt Conference, Finished fifth
2015–16	Elite League	1	8th	52	24	25	-	3	160	177	51	Won in Quarter Final, 8-6 (Sheffield) Won in Semi Final, 6-2 (Cardiff) Lost in Final, 2-0 (Nottingham)	Finished fifth in qualifying group	Erhardt Conference, Finished fifth IIHF Continental Cup, Finished second in group stage
2016–17	Elite League	1	9th	52	19	28	-	5	147	198	43		Finished fifth in qualifying group	Erhardt Conference, Finished fifth
2017–18	Elite League	1	8th	56	25	26	-	5	189	186	55	Lost in Quarter Final, 8-5 (Cardiff)	Finished fourth in qualifying group	Patton Conference, Finished third
2018–19	Elite League	1	8th	60	27	25	-	8	209	221	62	Lost in Quarter Final, 12-2 (Belfast)	Finished fourth in qualifying group	Patton Conference, Finished second
2019–20	Elite League	1	3rd	48	27	14	-	7	180	158	61		Finished third in qualifying group	
2021–22	Elite League	1	8th	54	23	26	-	5	154	173	51	Lost in Quarter Final, 4-3 (Belfast)	Finished third in qualifying group Lost in Quarter Final, 7-4 (Belfast)	
2022–23	Elite League	1	5th	54	33	15	-	6	200	161	72	Lost in Quarter Final, 6-3 (Cardiff)	Finished first in qualifying group Lost in Quarter Final, 9-3 (Guildford)	
2023–24	Elite League	1	6th	54	23	25	-	6	147	185	52	Lost in Quarter Final, 3-2 (Belfast)	Finished third in qualifying group Won in Quarter Final, 6-5 (Belfast); Lost in Semi Final, 10-1 (Sheffield)	
2024–25	Elite League	1	5th	54	30	20	-	4	183	167	64	Lost in Quarter Final, 8-3 (Cardiff)	Finished fourth in qualifying group	
2025–26	Elite League	1	7th	54	25	22	-	7	167	176	57	Lost in Quarter Final, 6-2 (Cardiff)	Finished in second qualifying group Won in Semi Final, 9-5 (Belfast); Lost in Final, 3-2 OT (Nottingham)	
Regular season totals				1284	710	460	20	94	4578	3885	1534	4 regular season titles (+1 British League Title)		
