= Miloš Melicherík =

Slovak ice hockey player

- Born: 7 October 1974 (age 51) Považská Bystrica, Czechoslovakia
- Height: 5 ft 11 in (180 cm)
- Weight: 175 lb (79 kg; 12 st 7 lb)
- Position: Center
- Shot: Left
- Played for: HC Dukla Trenčín; HC Havířov Panthers; HC Šumperk; HK Jestřábi Prostějov; EHC Wolfsburg; MHC Martin; Guildford Flames
- Playing career: 1993–2014

Miloš Melicherík (born 7 October 1974) is a Slovak retired ice hockey forward from Považská Bystrica. He is currently working as an assistant coach for the Guildford Flames of the Elite Ice Hockey League (EIHL).

== Playing career ==
Melicherík began his career in 1993 with HC Dukla Trenčín of the Slovak Extraliga where he played until 2000 when he moved to Czech Extraliga to play for HC Havířov Panthers, during that season he also appeared in games for Czech 1.liga sides HK Jestřábi Prostějov and Šumperk.

He then played one year for EHC Wolfsburg in the German 2nd Bundesliga. Melicherík returned to Slovakia for one more season which he split between Dukla Trenčín and MHC Martin.

In 340 games in the Slovak Extraliga Melicherík scored 77 goals and added 110 assists for 187 points.

Melicherík was then lured to play in Britain for Guildford Flames in the BNL. He helped the team to a play-off championship in his first year in 2003/2004, scoring 22 points in 14 play-off games. He remained with the Flames for the next 3 years playing again in the BNL and most recently 2 seasons with them in the EPIHL scoring 98 and 93 points in 05/06 and 06/07 respectively.

During the 2007/08 season he took extra responsibility as Player/Assistant Coach. He Currently sits 2nd in All-time Flames scoring, leading (or joint leading) the team in scoring 6 seasons in a row from 2003 to 2009. On 14 February Melicherík became the 3rd Flames player to score 500 points with an assist against the Peterborough Phantoms.

At the start of the 2009/10 season it was announced that Melicherik would become the club's Under 18's coach as well as being the assistant and bench coach. This meant he would be carried on the team's roster as a spare import and only play when others were unavailable under the import restrictions. A spree of injuries that prompted Head Coach Paul Dixon to say "We have half a dozen players out. I've not known a situation quite like this.", meant that Melicherik still played in over half of the team's games that year.

In August 2014, Melicherik announced his retirement from playing but remained with Guildford in the capacity as an assistant coach for the top team and the head coach for the junior team. Melicherik iced 11 seasons with the Guildford Flames, scoring 240 goals in 545 appearances for the club, 43 of which were game winners. He also contributed 537 assists and scored a total of 777 points. 39 of his goals were scored on the powerplay and 16 were shorthanded goals. During his time at the Flames he had a total of 717 penalty minutes.

== Awards and medals ==
- BNL Play-off Champions 03/04
- EPIHL League Champions 05/06, 07/08
- EPIHL Cup Champions 06/07, 09/10
- EPIHL Playoff Champions 10/11
- Play-offs Top Scorer BNL 03/04
- Named to BNL 2nd All-Star Team 03/04
- Named to EPIHL 2nd All-Star Team 05/06, 07/08

Slovak extraleague Champions 93/94, 96/97 Surrey Sport Personality of the Year Award 2013

== Career statistics ==
As of 07/08 (All competitions including playoffs)

Note: GP = Games played; G = Goals; A = Assists; Pts = Points; PIM = Penalty Minutes

Club	League	Year	GP	G	A	Pts	PIM
HK Dukla Trenčín	Extraliga (SVK)	93/94	24	2	2	4	0
Team Slovakia	WJC C	94	4	2	1	3	0
HK Dukla Trenčín	Extraliga (SVK) & Playoffs	94/95	39	8	11	19	4
HK Dukla Trenčín	Extraliga (SVK)	95/96	48	9	9	18	24
HK Dukla Trenčín	Extraliga (SVK)	96/97	52	17	23	40	22
HK Dukla Trenčín	Extraliga (SVK) + EHL	97/98	50	14	20	34	30
HK Dukla Trenčín	Extraliga (SVK)	98/99	32	7	6	13	53
HK Dukla Trenčín	Extraliga (SVK)	99/00	61	19	27	46	38
HC Havířov Panthers	Extraliga (CZE)	00/01	29	2	2	4	12
HC Šumperk	1.liga (CZE)	00/01	1	0	1	1	0
HC Prostějov	1.liga (CZE) & Playoffs	00/01	15	4	5	9	22
Wolfsburg Grizzly Adams	2. Bundesliga	01/02	54	11	19	30	69
HK Dukla Trenčín	Extraliga (SVK)	02/03	42	3	11	14	14
HC Martimex ZTS Martin	Extraliga (SVK) & Playoffs	02/03	11	1	5	6	10
Guildford Flames	British National League, Findus Cup & Playoffs	03/04	69	38	50	88	96
Guildford Flames	BNL, Winter Cup, Crossover League & Playoffs	04/05	70	19	55	74	94
Guildford Flames	English Premier League, EPL Cup & Playoffs	05/06	56	29	69	98	80
Guildford Flames	EPL, EPL Cup & Playoffs	06/07	52	26	67	93	104
Guildford Flames	EPL, EPL & K.O. Cups & Playoffs	07/08	59	29	61	90	92
Guildford Flames	EPL, EPL Cup & Playoffs	08/09	57	22	56	78	40
Guildford Flames	EPL, EPL Cup & Playoffs	09/10	35	20	37	57	22
Totals (Multiple Seasons)			GP	G	A	Pts.	PiMs
Extraliga Svk. Totals			340	77	110	187	177
U.K. (EPL/BNL) Totals			398	183	395	578	528
