= Telford Tigers =

Ice hockey team in Shropshire, England

- City: Telford, Shropshire
- League: NIHL
- Conference: England National
- Division: National League
- Founded: 1985
- Operated: 1985-1999, 2001-present
- Home arena: Telford Ice Rink; Capacity: 2300; Ice size: 184 ft x 85 ft 52.673810°N 2.445120°W
- Colours: White, Orange & Black
- General manager: Tom Watkins (England)
- Head coach: Tom Watkins (England)
- Captain: Scott McKenzie (United Kingdom) (Scotland)
- Affiliates: Telford Tigers 2, NIHL 2, Telford Junior ice hockey club (TJIHC)
- Website: Telford Tigers

Franchise history
- 1985-1999: Telford Tigers
- 1999-2000: Telford Timberwolves
- 2001-2005: Telford Wildfoxes
- 2005-present: Telford Tigers

The Telford Tigers are a National Ice Hockey League (NIHL) ice hockey team that formed in 1985. After initially closing in 1999, a new team, under the name 'Telford Wild Foxes', was formed in 2001; and re-adopted the original name in 2005.

The team is currently owned by Givarna Ltd. In November 2016, faced with mounting debts, the team began the process of entering creditors voluntary liquidation. A creditors' meeting, which would have decided the fate of the club, was scheduled for 30 November 2016, but on 25 November a consortium of local businesses intervened and acquired the club's assets, securing its future for the remainder of the season.

== History ==
=== 1985–1988: Foundation and early years ===
After the Telford Ice Rink opened in October 1984, several challenge games involving Altrincham Aces, Blackpool Seagulls, Nottingham Panthers and Solihull Barons were staged to see if a Telford team would be sustainable.

Telford Tigers IH Club Ltd. was formed for season 1985–86 by Central TV commentator Gary Newbon with entertainer David Ismay as chairman and Canadian defenceman Chuck Taylor as player coach. Newbon and Taylor had previously been involved with the Barons, as had squad members Mark Budz, Gordie Patterson, Alan Gould, Paul O'Higgin and Dave Welch. Goalie John Wolfe and Andy Steel signed for the new club from Grimsby.

The club had been granted permission by the BIHA to join the First Division of the British Hockey League, and finished third in their inaugural season, with near sell out crowds seeing Budz score 134 points and Taylor make the All Star Team.

In 1986–87, Tigers new import Dean Vogelgesang scored 196 points, and Budz made the All Star team with 200 points. Tigers did not lose a single home game, but finished fourth in the league due to a nine-point penalty inflicted on them for icing an ineligible player.

For 1987–88, the First Division was split into north–south conferences. Tigers won the Southern conference by two points, and beat Northern Conference champions Cleveland Bombers 21–14 on aggregate to take the title. They played Peterborough Pirates, who had finished bottom of the Premier Division, in a Promotion Playoff. After winning the first leg 14–12, they crumbled in the second. They led 6–1 after two periods but Pirates managed to score eight unanswered goals in the third to stay up by a single goal aggregate scoreline. Imports Kevin Conway and Tim Salmon were voted onto the All Star Team, and Chuck Taylor was named Coach of the Year.

=== 1989–1990: Financial problems ===
The next season was not so good for Telford. Gerald Waslen made the All Star Team, but the team struggled both on and off the ice. The team was put into liquidation in the summer.

=== 1991–1994: New ownership ===
A new company, Telford Tigers Ice Hockey Club (1990) reformed the team for next season. A year later, former NHLer Jere Gillis took over the coaching role from Taylor (who carried on as a managing director). By now, the junior programme was starting to pay dividends, with local youngsters Geoff Lane, Darren Broome, Norman Pinnington and Mark Hazlehurst all pulling on Tigers jerseys in the mid 1980s and early 1990s.

For the 1993–94 season Kevin Murphy was appointed head coach and introduced a three line system of forwards. It proved successful as Tigers beat Blackburn Hawks in a bad tempered semi-final and Medway Bears 11–7 on aggregate in the final of the Autumn Trophy and finished runners up in the league. However, later that month the club was issued with an order to fold owing £30,000 in unpaid VAT. A new club was formed, Taylor moved to Nottingham and the team again finished second in the league in 1994–95. John Wolfe was given All Star honours and the Telford-born Plant brothers, Russ and Ricky, were featuring on a regular basis.

=== 1995–1999: Financial problems ===
Claude Dumas, from Quebec, was signed from Cardiff in 1995, and was a catalyst for the Tigers in the late 1990s. He was an all star in 1996, 1997, 1998 and 1999 and was named player of the year in 1997–98. During this period he scored 443 goals and notched up 316 assists.

In December 1996, Tigers again ran into money troubles, but were saved by Ken Crickmore, who listed them on the OFEX stock market.

In 1997 John Lawless, who had achieved fame with Cardiff Devils and Manchester Storm, was announced as head coach. Under "JL", Telford finished as runners up in the British National League and lifted the Upper Deck Christmas Cup in 1997 with a 10–7 aggregate victory over Guildford Flames. They reached the Benson and Hedges Plate Final in 1998, but were beaten by Guildford 4–3 at Sheffield.

It was not to last, as Director Roy Williams resigned before Telford Tigers Ice Hockey plc went bankrupt, eventually being wound up in the High Court in Spring 1999 owing money to both Lawless and his players.

=== 1999–2000: Timberwolves ===
In Summer 1999, Telford Timberwolves were launched, but folded after losing 6 B&H Cup games, and playing in front of gates of only 500, half the size of Tigers' in their heyday.

=== 2001–2004: Wildfoxes ===
In 2001, the Wildfoxes competed in the amateur English National League. In 2003 they joined the EPL. Wildfoxes nurtured several promising youngsters including Jared Owen, Daniel Mackriel, Adam Brittle and Tom Carlon. Dumas returned as player coach in 2003.

=== 2005–2008: Tigers ===
The club returned to the name Telford Tigers for the 2005–06 season. In 2005–06, Tigers finished tenth out of thirteen teams in the EPL and had a good cup run, missing out on the semi-finals by 2 points in the preliminary group. Dumas was third in league scoring, and Slovakian Karol Jets seventh. Netminder Barry Hollyhead and British forwards Tom Carlon, Gareth Owen and Joe Miller all stood out.

2006–07 was a disappointment compared to the previous season. Hollyhead joined playoff champions Milton Keynes Lightning, Jets and his fellow Slovakian Tomas Janak moved to Solihull Barons, Miller joined Elite League team Manchester Phoenix and Carlon and Owen moved to Coventry Blaze. Marc Lovell joined from the Edinburgh Capitals, Juraj Huska and goalie Peter Betinec moved from Slovakian teams (although the latter was released midway through the season to be replaced by Milan Kostolny), and Dumas' former Coventry teammate Matthias Soderstrom (Swedish) joined from the Italian Serie B. Daniel Mackriel moved to Slough Jets midway through the season. Telford finished second bottom in the league, behind local rivals Solihull. To make matters worse, Solihull dropped down to the ENL at the end of the season, thus eliminating the West Midlands Derby from the fixture list.

For 2007–08 Miller, Owen, Mackriel, and Jets returned; D-men Tom Parker and Jake Armstrong joined from Solihull, and Dean Tonks signed from Peterborough Phantoms. However, Miller was unsettled and joined Peterborough in December. After a 9–6 loss away at Swindon Wildcats in January it now looks unlikely that Tigers will qualify for the end of season playoffs.

During the pre season it had been announced that the Telford Tigers had secured a new title sponsor, in the shape of Cannock-based company Eurologix. However, just a few weeks later, it was announced that Eurologix had pulled out of the deal, leaving the Tigers with a large hole in its finances. This was made all the more difficult as the club has begun to recruit players, and negotiate contracts based on the Eurologix money being part of the cash flow.

The GM Telford Tigers faced the MK Lightning for a back to back challenge before a trip to Coventry to face Elite champions Coventry Blaze in a fund raising game arranged following the sponsorship troubles. The first game with MK was away, and resulted in an 8–2 defeat. The return game the following night saw marked improvements from the Tigers as the new team started to gel. MK won the game by 2 goals to 0. The fund raiser at Coventry again saw the Tigers improve, and eventually lost 3–2.

=== 2009–2010: Financial problems ===
Telford Tigers did not ice during this season, mainly due to financial difficulties and missing a deadline for registration into the English Premier Ice Hockey League.

=== 2010–2012: The Fans' Trust ===
In February 2010, it was announced that a 'Fans Trust' had been formed, and that it was intending to ice a Telford Tigers team in the EPL once more. In April 2010, it was confirmed that the teams application to the EPL had been accepted.

=== 2013–2015: New ownership ===
In October 2013, the BBC reported that the CEO of Red Touch Media, Wayne Scholes had dissolved the 'Fans Trust' and taken over the team under a new company called Red Hockey Ltd. Scholes was the stick-boy for the team during the mid-1980s.

The Tigers won the EPL title on March 1, 2015 during their game against the Peterborough Phantoms.

=== 2016–2017: More Financial problems ===
Despite ongoing financial problems, the Tigers would have success on the ice. With captain Jason Silverthorn scoring 41 goals and talisman Doug Clarkson scoring 50 goals for Telford they would go on a winning streak for 15 games to win the English Premier Ice Hockey League and make it to the playoff finals losing narrowly to Milton Keynes Lightning.

=== 2017–2019: Rebuilding ===
During the offseason the league the Tigers had just won (the EPL) folded. This meant the Tigers had to start from scratch. The core leaders of the team moved to the Tigers NIHL North 1 side. The Tigers managed to hold on to coach and general manager Tom Watkins as well as the captain no22 Jason Silverthorn. After the financial problems of the season before this meant that Tigers started from a weakened financial position which leads to a smaller Roster and the Coach icing for part of the season, he played 15 games scoring 5 goals. Telford Tigers would go on to come 3rd in the NIHL North 1 conference, a semi-final loss in the NIHL National Cup and lost all games in the NIHL Autumn Cup. The Tigers' best result was to get to the finals of the playoffs in the Coventry Skydome finally losing to Basingstoke Bison 4–0 in the final.

The 2018/19 season saw another small roster but with the notable addition of fan-favorite Doug Clarkson who would go on to score 52 goals in only 27 games before returning to Canada. Unfortunately, the Tigers would come up short this season losing out to Sheffield Steeldogs in the final of the North Cup as well as Sheffield knocking out the Tigers in the semifinal of the postseason. The Tigers would come 3rd in the league but failed to record a win in the Autumn Cup.

=== 2019–2020: Coronavirus Season ===
After two seasons of building from the ground up Telford would have one of the best seasons in their history. In the offseason, a new division of the NIHL was created above NIHL 1 North and 1 South called the National League. This new league was similar to the old EPL having many of the same teams in it. Telford proceeded to dominate the league despite numerous injuries they went on to win the league with 2 rounds to spare. The coronavirus outbreak had started to grip the UK with the elite league cancelling all games that weekend but Telford needed one more win to see them clinch the title and credit to the Raiders IHC for making the trip to Telford to play the game despite tension and opposition around the league. On top of this, Telford went on to win the NIHL Cup at home against Peterborough Phantoms, as well as surviving a semifinal scare against Swindon Wildcats. Telford were led by the league's top netminder Brad Day as well as a man of the match performance by Brandon Whistle who scored a hattrick in the second leg of the final, winning 14–7 on aggregate over the two legs. Telford would have gone into the playoffs as favorites after their two titles, but because of the virus outbreak the league was ended early and it was decided the final 4 event would be moved to preseason of the 2020–2021 season.

=== 2020-2021: The Online Season ===
Due to the ongoing Coronavirus pandemic the Tigers were unable to ice. They announced signings of several players over 2020, Tom Watkins as Head Coach and General Manager, Barry Hollyhead and Karl Creamer as Assistant Coaches, Forward Scott McKenzie as a player and second team coach, Forward Brandon Whistle, Forward & Captain Jason Silverthorn, Defenceman Corey Goodison, Forward Jack Watkins, Net minder Brad Day and finally Defenceman Andy McKinney. Although the signings were announced no hockey materialised but the Tigers were approved as an EIHA Elite category under the Department for Digital, Culture, Media and Sport (DCMS) guidelines. This would means they would be government approved to play hockey if the opportunity arose.

On 2 February 2021 the Tigers announced they would be partaking in an online streaming series. It was called the NIHL Spring Cup and would be made of 5 NIHL National Division teams (Telford Tigers, Sheffield Steeldogs, Bees IHC, Swindon Wildcats & Raiders IHC) and would be all streamed online with no fans in attendance. The Telford Tigers proceed to announce an expanded roster with a few Elite League (EIHL) players who were not playing due to that league's suspension, most notably defenceman David Clements and forwards Ross Venus and Robert Lachowicz.

== Club roster 2022-23 ==
(*) Denotes a Non-British Trained player (Import)

Netminders
No.	Nat.	Player	Catches	Date of birth	Place of birth	Acquired	Contract
30	(England)	Bradley Day	L	24 June 1994 (age 31)	Huddersfield, England	2019 from Sheffield Steelers	22/23
35	(England)	Ryan Lewis		2001 (age 21)	England	2017 from Telford U18	22/23

Defencemen
No.	Nat.	Player	Shoots	Date of birth	Place of birth	Acquired	Contract
8	(England)	Jake Price	L	27 March 2000 (age 25)	Solihull, England	2021 from Niagara Whalers	22/23
12	(England)	Daniel Rose	R	5 October 1994 (age 31)	Nottingham, England	2012 from Nottingham Lions	22/23
14	(England)	Jonathan Weaver 'A'	L	20 January 1977 (age 49)	Sunderland, England	2014 from Nottingham Panthers	22/23
16	(England)	Corey Goodison	R	8 May 1997 (age 28)	Birmingham, England	2015 from Coventry Blaze NIHL	22/23
26	(England)	Deakan Fielder	L	11 April 2000 (age 25)	Telford, England	2021 from Bees IHC	22/23
42	(England)	Nick Oliver	R	22 March 1997 (age 28)	Liverpool, England	2018 from Blackburn Hawks	22/23
91	(England)	Rhodes Mitchell-King	L	26 June 2003 (age 22)	Warwick, England	2022 from Wisconsin Rapids Riverkings	Two-Way

Forwards
No.	Nat.	Player	Shoots	Date of birth	Place of birth	Acquired	Contract
7	(Wales)	Bayley Harewood	R	7 July 2003 (age 22)	Barry, Wales	2021 from Bees IHC	Two-Way
10	(England)	Lucas Price	L	15 October 2004 (age 21)	Solihull, England	2021 from Nottingham Cougars U18	22/23
17	(England)	Rick Plant 'A'	R	23 November 1977 (age 48)	Telford, England	2013 from Guildford Flames	22/23
22	(United Kingdom) (Canada)	Jason Silverthorn 'C'	R	1 July 1979 (age 46)	Owen Sound, ON, Canada	2014 from Hull Stingrays	22/23
23	(England)	Daniel Mulcahy	R	1 December 2000 (age 25)	Solihull, England	2022 from Solihull Barons	22/23
25	(England)	Sam Watkins	R	2003 (age 19)	England	2019 from Telford U18	22/23
38	(England)	Thomas Byrne		2004 (age 18)	England	2021 from Telford U18	22/23
46	(England)	Finley Howells	L	26 December 2002 (age 23)	Telford, England	2018 from Ontario Hockey Academy U18	22/23
61	(England)	Brodie Jesson	R	6 October 2000 (age 25)	England	2021 from Solihull Barons	22/23
77	(Scotland)	Scott McKenzie	L	8 June 1986 (age 39)	Dunfermline, Scotland	2017 from Deeside Dragons	22/23
93	(England)	Jack Watkins	R	3 February 1993 (age 33)	Durham, England	2017 from Billingham Stars	22/23
94	(Czech Republic)	Vladimír Luka*	R	7 March 1982 (age 43)	Karviná, Czech Republic	2021 from Sheffield Scimitars	22/23

Team Staff
No.	Nat.	Name	Position	Acquired	Place of birth	Joined from
	(England)	Tom Watkins	General Manager/Head Coach	2010-11	Durham, England
	(England)	Karl Creamer	Assistant Coach	2012-13	Liverpool, England	Flintshire Freeze, ENL
	(England)	Steve Molyneux	Assistant Coach/Athletic Trainer	2022-23	England
	(England)	Barry Holyhead	Goaltending Coach	2013-14	Shrewsbury, England
	(England)	Martin Sneyd	Athletic Trainer	2022-23	England
	(England)	Mike Washburn	Chairman	2017-18	England	Telford Tigers NIHL, NIHL 1
	(England)	Andy Phillips	Equipment Manager	2004-05	England	MK Lightning, EPIHL
	(England)	Tom Collins	Physical Therapist	2022-23	England

== 2021/22 Outgoing ==
Outgoing
No.	Nat.	Player	Shoots	Date of birth	Place of birth	Leaving For
11	(England)	Austin Mitchell-King	L	1 November 2001 (age 24)	Warwick, England	Peterborough Phantoms, NIHL
18	(England)	Joe Aston	L	2 January 1997 (age 29)	Plymouth, England	Telford Tigers 2, NIHL 2
47	(Scotland)	Ross Connolly	L	8 July 1998 (age 27)	Paisley, Scotland	Hull Seahawks, NIHL
84	(Scotland)	Tom McKinnon	L	31 December 1996 (age 29)	Irvine, Scotland	TBA
91	(England) (Canada)	Andy McKinney	R	13 April 1991 (age 34)	Hamilton, ON, Canada	Deeside Dragons, NIHL 1

=== Retired numbers ===
1. 9 Claude Dumas
2. 19 Daniel MacKriel
3. 20 Tom Watkins
4. 21 Chuck Taylor

== Telford Tigers and The NHL ==
Jere Gillis played with the Tigers as well as being head coach from 1990-1992. He had previously played for the Vancouver Canucks, New York Rangers, Buffalo Sabres and Philadelphia Flyers.
