= Mark Lovell =

Mark Lovell may refer to:

- Mark Lovell (rally driver)
- Mark Lovell (footballer)
- Mark Lovell (politician)

== See also ==
- Marc Lovell, English ice hockey player
