= Dave Clancy =

- Born: 9 September 1978 (age 47) Rinteln, West Germany
- Height: 5 ft 8 in (173 cm)
- Weight: 171 lb (78 kg; 12 st 3 lb)
- Position: Goaltender
- Catches: Left
- ENL team Former teams: Flintshire Freeze; Manchester Phoenix
- Playing career: 2001–present

Dave Clancy (born 9 September 1978) is an English ice hockey goaltender, who most recently played for the Flintshire Freeze in the ENL. Clancy began his career playing at deeside junior ice hockey club. Then worked his way up to play some games for the senior team. He then left the club to go and play for the Altrincham Tigers at Under-19 level. He backstopped the Tigers to a national tournament win in Cardiff, claiming the 'Goalie of the Tournament' award along the way. Clancy was also selected for the Team G.B. U-20 squad the same year, but was unavailable to travel with the squad.

After spending time with the Flintshire Freeze, and establishing himself as their first choice goaltender, Clancy signed for the Manchester Phoenix in the summer of 2003. It would be the team's inaugural season in the EIHL but Clancy was mainly used as a back-up to first choice goaltender Jayme Platt. He played in games with the Phoenix holding a shut out to win in London against the London Racers. Unfortunately after just one season, the franchise was temporarily suspended and so Clancy sought employment elsewhere, signing for the Swindon Wildcats at English Premier Ice Hockey League, EPIHL level. Clancy failed to make his mark though due to travelling, work and family commitments.

Clancy would then move back to the north west, signing for the Blackburn Hawks, where he carried his goaltending duties establishing himself as their first choice . Clancy played 35 regular season games in two seasons, 2004/05 and 2005/06 as well as featuring in all playoff games and a number of cup competitions. After this, Clancy would re-sign for the Freeze in 2006 and re-establish himself as the first choice goaltender ahead of another ex-Phoenix goalie, Matt Compton. Clancy would continue as one of the Freeze goaltenders in the 2008/09 season, making 18 appearances in league and cup competitions.
