= Matt Compton =

English ice hockey player

- Born: 29 December 1983 (age 42) Chester, England
- Height: 6 ft 0 in (183 cm)
- Weight: 215 lb (98 kg; 15 st 5 lb)
- Position: Goaltender
- Catches: Left
- ENHL team Former teams: Flintshire Freeze; Manchester Phoenix
- Playing career: 2000–present

Matt Compton (born 29 December 1983) is an English former ice hockey goaltender. He played for clubs including Flintshire Freeze, Blackburn Hawks and Manchester Phoenix. Compton began playing at a higher standard in 2000, when he kept goal for the Deeside Avalanche at U-19 level, making 11 appearances in his first year and maintaining a save percentage of over 87%.

He would move on to sign for the Flintshire Freeze, a Welsh team playing in the ENHL. Compton would remain with Flintshire for the next four seasons and featured regularly throughout each term. During his first spell with Flintshire, his save percentage was never allowed to drop below 85%, and one season was as high as 91%.

Compton's talent as a goaltender led to his move North for the 2005/06 season, signing with the Blackburn Hawks. Compton was the Hawks' starting goaltender and played 40 games with a goals against average of 2.7 goals per game. Compton would only stay one season in Blackburn before being picked up by the EIHL team, the Manchester Phoenix. Whilst in Manchester, Compton had limited opportunities and was used mainly as a backup to first-choice goaltender Jason Wolfe.

The lack of any chances to prove himself led Compton to part with Manchester during the summer of 2007. He chose to return to the team where he had made his name, signing again for the Flintshire Freeze. Compton has again been playing for the Freeze but has shared the goaltending duties with Dave Clancy and Phil Crosby. Compton would continue his association with the Freeze during the 2008/09 season, making 12 appearances in league and cup competition.
