= Terry Kurtenbach =

Canadian ice hockey player

- Born: April 6, 1963 (age 61); Souris, Manitoba, Canada
- Height: 6 ft 0 in (183 cm)
- Weight: 185 lb (84 kg; 13 st 3 lb)
- Position: Defence
- Shot: Left
- Played for: Nottingham Panthers; Romford Raiders; Guildford Flames
- National team: Great Britain
- NHL draft: undrafted
- Playing career: 1979–1989

Terry Kurtenbach (born March 14, 1963) is a Canadian and British former ice hockey player from Canada. He spent his entire professional career playing in the United Kingdom.

Born in Souris, Manitoba, Kurtenbach began his career for Nottingham Panthers in the British Hockey League in 1986. "TK" patrolled the blue line in Nottingham until 1993 when he made the switch to Romford Raiders for just a single season. He then moved onto Guildford Flames where he spent the next 5 seasons until 1999 when he retired.

Kurtenbach remains Nottingham's leading defenceman of all time with 313 goals and 784 points. He is currently 8th all-time in the Guildford Flames All Time Scorers list.

Kurtenbach also played for Great Britain. In September 2007 he was appointed to help run the Guildford Flames Junior program.
