= Paul Dixon (ice hockey) =

- Born: 4 August 1973 (age 53) Sunderland, UK
- Height: 5 ft 10 in (178 cm)
- Weight: 185 lb (84 kg; 13 st 3 lb)
- Position: Head Coach (former Defence)
- Shot: Right
- EIHL team Former teams: Guildford Flames; Durham Wasps; Humberside Seahawks; Sheffield Steelers; Newcastle Vipers
- Playing career: 1989–2010

Paul Dixon (born 4 August 1973) is a former ice hockey defenceman and player-coach from Sunderland, England. He is currently the head coach for the Guildford Flames of the Elite Ice Hockey League, the top-tier of hockey in the United Kingdom.

== Playing career ==
After working his way through the Durham Wasps youth system, Dixon made his first appearance for the senior side in the 1989/90 season. After the 1990/91 season, Dixon moved to the Hull-based Humberside Seahawks where he helped them gain promotion to the Heineken League Premier Division Dixon then played a season with the Sheffield Steelers where he and the team achieved the same feat. He moved back home to play for the Durham Wasps for 3 years until they were sold and moved to Newcastle Upon Tyne in 1996, where he spent another 3 years playing for the Newcastle-based team, now known as Newcastle Vipers.

In the summer of 1999 Dixon made the move south to Surrey-based outfit the Guildford Flames where he remains as player/head coach. From the start of his Flames career Dixon was given the alternate captain position. After being awarded the Alan Weeks Trophy in 2001, he was made captain of the side, a position he held until taking over as head coach in 2007, thus making him the longest serving Flames captain. During his time with the Flames, Dixon was selected to the British National League first all-star team on three occasions (2001, 2004 & 2005) and the second team once (2003), as well as the English Premier Ice Hockey League first all-star team in 2006 & 2007. and second all-star team in 2008 and 2009. Since 1999, he has helped the Surrey team to an ntl: Christmas Cup championship as well as a BNL league title, two BNL play-off championships, 2 EPIHL League titles and 2 EPIHL Cup titles. He currently sits in 6th for All-time Flames points, and is the highest scoring defenceman.

=== Playing record ===
Year by Year Record

Includes Play-Offs & Cups

Note: GP = Games played; G = Goals; A = Assists; Pts = Points; PIM = Penalty Minutes. All Stats from either Eurohockey.net' or Guildford Flames' websites

Club	Year	League	GP	G	A	Pts	PIM
Durham Wasps	89–90	BHL	39	2	11	13	12
Durham Wasps	90–91	BHL	53	4	9	13	28
Humberside Seahawks	91–92	BHL	52	13	17	30	32
Sheffield Steelers	92–93	BNL	40	11	22	33	28
Durham Wasps	93–94	BNL	58	14	29	43	40
Durham Wasps	94–95	BNL	51	9	26	35	28
Durham Wasps	95–96	BNL	47	8	25	33	28
Newcastle Cobras	96–97	ISL	50	0	8	8	8
Newcastle Cobras	97–98	ISL	54	5	10	15	20
Newcastle Riverkings	98–99	ISL	52	4	2	6	6
Guildford Flames	99-00	BNL	50	7	32	39	30
Guildford Flames	00-01	BNL	62	5	27	32	40
Guildford Flames	01-02	BNL	37	2	12	14	22
Guildford Flames	02-03	BNL	59	8	23	31	36
Guildford Flames	03-04	BNL	64	10	40	50	16
Guildford Flames	04-05	BNL	68	6	37	43	22
Guildford Flames	05-06	EPL	50	11	27	38	24
Guildford Flames	06-07	EPL	59	12	46	58	66
Guildford Flames	07-08	EPL	54	9	38	47	48
Guildford Flames	08-09	EPL	57	7	30	37	32
Guildford Flames	09-10	EPL	59	6	32	38	44
Career Totals			GP	G	A	Pts.	PiMs
			1115	153	503	656	608
BHL			144	19	37	56	72
BNL			536	80	273	353	290
ISL			156	9	20	29	32
EPL			289	45	173	218	214

== Coaching career ==
For the 2005/2006 season, head coach Stan Marple announced that Dixon would be undertaking assistant coach duties while still playing for the Guildford Flames. During the 2006/2007 season, Marple announced it would be his last and that Dixon would take over as player/head coach after the season. His first new signing was star forward Lukas Smital from local rivals the Bracknell Bees. In his first season as Flames coach Dixon led his team to another EPIHL Championship with a 30–5–5 league regular season record, earning him EPIHL coach of the year. 2008/09 was less successful with a 3rd-place finish in the league and no silverware with a regular season record of 34–17–3.

=== Coaching career statistics ===
Including League, Cups and Playoffs

Year	Team	League	Games	W	L	OT/T	%	Finish	Playoffs	Cup
2007–08	Guildford Flames	EPIHL	61	43	13	5	0.745	1st	Lost semi-final	Group Stage
2008–09	Guildford Flames	EPIHL	61	38	18	5	0.664	3rd	Lost semi-final	Runners Up
2009–10	Guildford Flames	EPIHL	62	40	19	3	0.669	4th	Runners Up	Winners

== International play ==
Dixon was first selected to play for Team GB in the 1995 IIHF World Championship Division I (Formerly Pool B). Between 1995 and 2004, Dixon made 54 Appearances scoring 4 goals and adding 15 assists. It was widely thought that Dixon had retired from International Ice Hockey, which was disproved in January 2008 with Dixon's inclusion into the GB squad for the Euro tournament in France, although he had to pull out through injury.

=== International playing record ===
Year-by-year record

Note: GP = Games played; G = Goals; A = Assists; Pts = Points; PIM = Penalty minutes. All stats from either Eurohockey.net

Competition	Year	GP	G	A	Pts	PIM
World Championships Group B	95	5	1	1	2	2
World Championships Group B	96	7	1	1	2	14
World Championships Group B	97	7	0	1	1	0
World Championships Group B	98	4	0	2	2	2
World Championships Qualification	99	3	0	0	0	0
World Championships Group B	99	7	0	1	1	0
World Championships Group B	00	7	0	2	2	0
World Championships Division 1	01	5	1	2	3	0
World Championships Division 1	02	5	0	3	3	2
World Championships Division 1	04	4	1	2	3	4
Totals		GP	G	A	Pts	PIM
GB Totals		54	4	15	19	24

== Honours and awards ==
- Best defenceman at the European Junior Championships Pool C 1990–91
- Player's Player 1999–00
- Best British Defenceman 2000–01
- Named to the BNL All Star First Team 2000–01, 2003–04 and 2004–05
- Named to the BNL All Star Second Team 2002–03
- Named to the EPIHL All Star Team First 2005–06 and 2006–07
- Named to the EPIHL All Star Team Second 2007–08
- Named EPIHL Coach of the Year 2007–08
