= Gardiner Conference =

(United Kingdom) Gardiner Conference
- League: Elite Ice Hockey League
- Sport: Ice Hockey
- Founded: 2012
- Folded: 2019
- No. of teams: 3
- Last champion: Glasgow clan

The Gardiner Conference was one of three conferences in the Elite Ice Hockey League (EIHL) and comprised Three teams. Its counterparts are the Erhardt Conference and the newly formed, for the 2017-18 season, Patton Conference. It is named after former Chicago Blackhawks goaltender Charlie Gardiner and was introduced for the 2012–13 EIHL season. The Gardiner Conference Championship was played for over 24 regular season games, each team playing the other two teams eight times (four home and four away). The winner received the Gardiner Trophy and is seeded in the top three (the exact seed dependent on the overall League Championship final standings) for the end-of-season Elite League Play-Offs. These 24 games also made up the total of 56 regular season games which decide the overall League Champions of the Elite Ice Hockey League.

== Clubs ==
Gardiner clubs
Club	Established	City	Stadium	Capacity*
Glasgow Clan	2010	(Scotland) Glasgow	Braehead Arena	3,750
Dundee Stars	2001	(Scotland) Dundee	Dundee Ice Arena	2,400
Fife Flyers	1938	(Scotland) Kirkcaldy	Fife Ice Arena	2,414

=== Former Teams ===
Former Gardiner clubs
Club	Years	City	Stadium	Capacity*
Hull Stingrays	2003-2015	(England) Hull	Hull Arena	3,150
Edinburgh Capitals	1998-2018	(Scotland) Edinburgh	Murrayfield Ice Arena	3,800
Manchester Storm	1995-2002	(England) Altrincham	Silver Blades Ice Rink Altrincham	2,100

== Winners ==
SEASON	CHAMPIONS	RUNNERS-UP
2012-13	(Scotland) Braehead Clan	(Scotland) Fife Flyers
2013-14	(Scotland) Dundee Stars	(England) Hull Stingrays
2014-15	(Scotland) Braehead Clan	(Scotland) Fife Flyers
2015-16	(Scotland) Braehead Clan	(Scotland) Fife Flyers
2016-17	(Scotland) Braehead Clan	(Scotland) Dundee Stars
2017-18	(Scotland) Fife Flyers	(Scotland) Braehead Clan
2018-19	(Scotland) Glasgow Clan	(Scotland) Dundee Stars

=== Results ===
	Club	Wins	Runners up	Winning years
1	(Scotland) Glasgow Clan	5	1	2012-13, 2015-15, 2015-16, 2016-17, 2018-19
2	(Scotland) Fife Flyers	1	3	2017-18
3	(Scotland) Dundee Stars	1	2	2013-14
4	(England) Hull Stingrays	0	1	N/A
