= Ricky Plant =

British ice hockey player

- Plant is the goal scorer.
- Born: 23 November 1977 (age 48) Telford, UK
- Height: 6 ft 1 in (185 cm)
- Weight: 210 lb (95 kg; 15 st 0 lb)
- Position: Right wing
- Shoots: Right
- NIHL team Former teams: Telford Tigers; Blackburn Hawks; Milton Keynes Kings; Guildford Flames
- Playing career: 1994–present

Ricky Plant (born 23 November 1977) is a British ice hockey player from Telford, UK. He plays right wing.

== Career ==
Rick Plant began his career with the local side Telford Tigers in 1994. He spent 3 years away from his local side with Milton Keynes Kings, Blackburn Hawks, Swindon Icelords and Guildford Flames.

He returned to Telford for a year in 98/99, before joining the Guildford Flames again, where he played until 2004.

In March 2004, he tested positive for "A banned Class 'A' stimulant". He was banned for 18 months from the game. Flames, who have a very much admired 'drug-freeze' program, vowed to give Plant all the 'assistance' he needed in the 'unfortunate circumstances'.

In September 2005, the Flames announced that Rick Plant would be joining the team again after serving his ban. He swiftly showed fans that he had lost none of his scoring ability, scoring 72 points in 47 EPIHL league games, followed by 53 points in 2006–2007.

He signed up to play for Guildford for the 2007–08 season and was assigned the club captaincy.

Scoring 22+42, he slowly gained confidence as a captain in taking charge on the ice. The Club confirmed in late May 2008 that he would be returning for his 10th year in a Flames Shirt for the 2008–09 season, coming off his first as a title-winning captain.

Plant is the Flames' top scoring British player of All-time, and third overall. On 31 January, Plant became only the 2nd Flames player of all time to achieve 500 points, with an assist against the Wightlink Raiders.

== Year by Year ==
Team	Year	League	GP	G	A	Pts	PIM
Telford Tigers	1994–95	BL	41	18	20	38	16
Team Great Britain	1995	WJC C	5	1	0	1	0
Milton Keynes Kings	1995–96	BL	42	4	7	11	32
Blackburn Hawks	1995–96	BL	2	0	0	0	0
Swindon IceLords	1996–97	BL	51	13	16	29	8
Guildford Flames	1997–98	BNL	50	24	18	42	38
Telford Tigers	1998–99	BNL+Cup	41	12	19	31	6
Guildford Flames	1999–00	BNL+Cup	56	19	26	45	50
Guildford Flames	2000–01	BNL+Cup	68	12	26	38	18
Guildford Flames	2001–02	BNL+Cup	54	7	21	28	63
Guildford Flames	2002–03	BNL+Cup	58	13	16	29	56
Guildford Flames	2003–04	BNL+Cup	53	11	24	35	20
BANNED	2004–05	-	-	-	-	-	-
Guildford Flames	2005–06	EPL+Cup	59	29	56	85	42
Guildford Flames	2006–07	EPL+Cup	62	23	48	71	109
Guildford Flames	2007–08	EPL+Cups	61	22	42	64	76
Guildford Flames	2008–09	EPL+Cup	55	19	34	53	79
Guildford Flames	2009–10	EPL+Cup	57	25	29	54	24

Telford Tigers // 2013-23 //

== Medals and Titles ==
Club	Year	Title/Cup
Telford Tigers	1996–97	British Premier League Winner
Guildford Flames	1997–98	British National League Winner, British National League Play-Off Winner, British National League Southern Conference Winner
Guildford Flames	2000–01	ntl: Christmas Cup Winner, British National League Winner, British National League Playoff Winner
Guildford Flames	2003–04	British National League Playoff Winner
Guildford Flames	2005–06	English Premier League Regular Season Winner
Guildford Flames	2006–07	English Premier (Knock-out) Cup Winner
Guildford Flames	2007–08	English Premier League Regular Season Winner
Guildford Flames	2009–10	English Premier (Knock-out) Cup Winner
