= Marc Lovell =

- Born: 2 June 1982 (age 44) Chester, England
- Height: 6 ft 0 in (183 cm)
- Weight: 202 lb (92 kg; 14 st 6 lb)
- Position: Left wing
- Shoots: Left
- ENL team Former teams: Flintshire Freeze; Edinburgh Capitals
- Playing career: 2002–present

Marc Lovell (born 2 June 1982 in Chester, England) is an English professional ice hockey player, currently playing for the Flintshire Freeze in the English National Ice Hockey League.

Lovell began his career in 2002 after having been encouraged by watching the Deeside Dragons. After teaching himself to skate and then play to a reasonable standard, he began to play for the Telford Wild Foxes in the English Premier Ice Hockey League. His first season was an excellent one, and in 33 games scored 14 goals and 12 assists as well as totalling 34 penalty minutes. He would start the following 2003/04 season as a WildFox, but was quickly signed up by the Manchester Phoenix, a newly established team icing in the Elite Ice Hockey League, the highest standard of club hockey in the United Kingdom.

Lovell would be a regular player for the Phoenix, playing 54 regular season and 6 postseason games, although only managing 7 points in that time. Despite making the post-season, the Manchester organisation would encounter financial difficulties stemming from their use of the Manchester Evening News Arena and its significant rental costs. This meant that the Phoenix would be temporarily suspended in the summer of 2004, leaving Lovell without a club.

He would return to the Telford Wildfoxes for the 2004/05 season and played in 22 games, although again struggled to find his scoring touch, managing just three points all season. He stayed in Telford though and would ice as a Telford Tiger the year after as the organisation underwent a name change.

A second opportunity to play in the EIHL arose, and in the summer of 2006, Lovell signed for the Edinburgh Capitals. Opportunities were hard to come by, though, and after just two games and one point, Lovell was released by the Capitals and would play out the rest of the season with Telford, although he would be released in the summer of 2007. After his release, Lovell would move to join the Flintshire Freeze. During the 2008/09 campaign, he would manage to score 29 points in 23 games and was announced as the club captain.
