= Wayne Scholes =

British businessman

- Born: Telford, Shropshire, England
- Occupation: Businessman
- Known for: Chief executive of Red Touch Media; owner of the Telford Tigers (2013–2016)

Wayne Scholes is a British businessman. He is the chief executive of the media technology company Red Touch Media and owned the ice hockey club the Telford Tigers from 2013 to 2016.

== Early life ==
Scholes was born in Telford and grew up in Wellington. As a boy in the mid-1980s, he was a stick boy for the Telford Tigers and helped the team's kit manager. He left Shropshire for London at 16 and later did missionary work in Northern Ireland.

== Career ==
Scholes runs Red Touch Media, a digital media company that sponsored the Telford Tigers. In October 2013, he bought the club from its supporters' trust through a new company, Red Hockey Limited. Under his ownership, the Tigers won the English Premier Ice Hockey League in 2015, their first league title in 27 years.

He passed control of the club to a new company in 2016. Later that year, the Tigers ran into debts of about £500,000, and a group of local businesses, including Scholes, bought the club's assets.
