= Flintshire Freeze =

- City: Queensferry
- League: ENIHL
- Division: North
- Founded: 1998
- Operated: 1998–2012
- Home arena: Deeside Leisure Centre
- Colors: White, Black & Purple
- General manager: Nigel Ryland
- Head coach: (England) Mark Hobson
- Captain: (Wales) Peter Founds
Home colours	Away colours

Championships
- Playoff championships: one (2003-04)

Flintshire Freeze were a Welsh ice hockey team that play in the English National Ice Hockey League, north division. They played their games at Deeside Leisure Centre, Flintshire. They won the North League championship in the 2003/2004 season. After the re-design of the ENIHL after the 2007/08 season, the Freeze played in the North 2 conference. In 2012 the team were dissolved and replaced by a reformed Deeside Dragons.

== Final roster ==
Goaltenders

- (England) Dave Clancy
- (England) Phil Crosby
- (England) Matt Compton

Defenceman

- (England) Steve Elliott
- (Wales) Steve Fellows
- (Wales) Shane Kinsey
- (Wales) Alex Bryn Roberts
- (England) Dave Costelloe

Forwards

- (England) Rob Griffin
- (England) Andrew Chappell
- (Wales) Gary Dixon
- (Wales) Lee Wheeler (MIA)
- (Wales) Marc Lovell
- (England) Chris Jones
- (Wales) James Parsons
- (Czech Republic) Martin Barta

Season	Position	Wins	Draws	Losses	±
2009-10	2	19	1	4	118
2010-11	3	14	1	9	21
2011-12	3	16	1	11	1
