= Peter Johnson (ice hockey, born 1946) =

British ice hockey player

- Born: 14 April 1946 (age 80) Langley Park, England
- Position: Right wing / Defence
- Played for: Durham Wasps
- National team: Great Britain
- Playing career: 1962–1989

Peter "Jonker" Johnson (born 14 April 1946 in Langley Park, County Durham) is a retired British ice hockey player. He is mainly remembered for playing for the Durham Wasps during the 1960s, 1970s and 1980s. He also played for the Great Britain national team in 1971 and 1973. He was inducted into the British Ice Hockey Hall of Fame in 1989.
