= Erhardt Conference =

(United Kingdom) Erhardt Conference
- League: Elite Ice Hockey League
- Sport: Ice Hockey
- Founded: 2012
- Folded: 2019
- No. of teams: 4
- Last champion: Belfast Giants

The Erhardt Conference was one of three conferences in the Elite Ice Hockey League (EIHL) and comprised four teams. Its counterparts are the Gardiner Conference and the newly formed, for the 2017-18 season, Patton Conference. It is named after the captain of the British 1936 Winter Olympics gold medal winning team Carl Erhardt and was introduced for the 2012–13 EIHL season. The Erhardt Conference Championship was played for over 24 regular season games, each team playing the other three teams eight times (four home and four away). The winner received the Erhardt Trophy and is seeded in the top three (the exact seed dependent on the overall League Championship final standings) for the end-of-season Elite League Play-Offs. These 24 games also made up the total of 56 regular season games which decide the overall League Champions of the Elite Ice Hockey League.

== Teams ==
| TEAM | CITY/TOWN | ARENA | CAPACITY |
|---|---|---|---|
| Belfast Giants | (Northern Ireland) Belfast | The O2 Belfast | 8,300 |
| Cardiff Devils | (Wales) Cardiff | Ice Arena Wales | 3,088 |
| Nottingham Panthers | (England) Nottingham | Motorpoint Arena Nottingham | 10,000 |
| Sheffield Steelers | (England) Sheffield | Utilita Arena | 9,300 |

== Former Teams ==
| TEAM | CITY/TOWN | ARENA | CAPACITY |
|---|---|---|---|
| Coventry Blaze | (England) Coventry | SkyDome Arena | 3,000 |

== Winners ==
| SEASON | CHAMPIONS | RUNNERS-UP |
|---|---|---|
| 2012-13 | Belfast Giants | Nottingham Panthers |
| 2013-14 | Belfast Giants | Sheffield Steelers |
| 2014-15 | Nottingham Panthers | Sheffield Steelers |
| 2015-16 | Cardiff Devils | Sheffield Steelers |
| 2016-17 | Cardiff Devils | Belfast Giants |
| 2017-18 | Cardiff Devils | Belfast Giants |
| 2018-19 | Belfast Giants | Cardiff Devils |
