= Patton Conference =

(United Kingdom) Patton Conference
- League: Elite Ice Hockey League
- Sport: Ice Hockey
- Founded: 2017
- Folded: 2019
- No. of teams: 4
- Last champion: Guildford Flames

The Patton Conference was one of three conferences in the Elite Ice Hockey League (EIHL) and comprised four teams. Its counterparts are the Erhardt Conference and the Gardiner Conference. It is named after IIHF and British Hockey Hall of Fame inductee Major Bethune Minet “Peter” Patton and was introduced for the 2017–18 EIHL season. The Patton Conference Championship was played for over 24 regular season games, each team playing the other three teams eight times (four home and four away). The winner received the Patton Trophy and is seeded in the top three (the exact seed dependent on the overall League Championship final standings) for the end-of-season Elite League Play-Offs. These 24 games also made up the total of 56 regular season games which decide the overall League Champions of the Elite Ice Hockey League.

== Teams ==
TEAM	CITY/TOWN	ARENA	CAPACITY
Coventry Blaze	(England) Coventry	SkyDome Arena	3,000
Guildford Flames	(England) Guildford	Guildford Spectrum	2,200
Manchester Storm	(England) Altrincham	Silverblades Ice Rink Altrincham	2,400
Milton Keynes Lightning	(England) Milton Keynes	Planet Ice Milton Keynes	2,800

== Winners ==
SEASON	CHAMPIONS	RUNNERS-UP
2017-18	Manchester Storm	Guildford Flames
2018-19	Guildford Flames	Coventry Blaze
