= Red Touch Media =

- Type: Private company
- Industry: Software
- Founded: 2001; 25 years ago
- Headquarters: Salt Lake City, United States
- Area served: Worldwide
- Key people: Wayne Scholes (CEO); Collin Zito (COO); Trevor Suelzle (CFO)
- Products: Red Touch Bridge, Red Touch Express, Red Touch Connect
- Services: Content Management, Distribution, Music, Television, eBooks, Film, Software
- Number of employees: 60 (2013)
- Website: www.redtouchmedia.com

Red Touch Media is an American software technology company that specializes in white label content management and distribution systems for multimedia. Red Touch Media currently has operations in Salt Lake City, London, Liverpool, Cape Town, New York City and Los Angeles. Wayne Scholes is the CEO.

The company specializes in digital content management via a multi-purpose distribution platform. The company creates websites, apps and kiosks that enable partners to distribute digital entertainment content to consumers. It also provides analytics to retailers and content providers.

== History ==
The company was founded in 2001 in Salt Lake City.

By 2013, Red Touch Media's network managed more than 2 billion files each month including TV shows, movies, ebooks, games, software and music.

As of 2013, Red Touch serves more than 3 million consumers worldwide.

== Alumni Staff ==
- Jesse Redniss Advisory Board
- Frank Radice Advisory Board
- Jon Accarrino VP of Marketing, Interim CMO
