= Stan Marple =

Canadian ice hockey player and coach

- Born: February 29, 1968 (age 58) Alberta, Canada
- Height: 5 ft 7 in (170 cm)
- Weight: 194 lb (88 kg; 13 st 12 lb)
- Position: Right Wing
- Shot: Right
- Playing career: 1986–2007

Stanislaus Henry Marple is a Canadian former professional ice hockey player and coach. Marple played twelve seasons in various British leagues, most notably for the Guildford Flames, for whom he later served as head coach. He was the general manager for the University of Alberta's men's hockey team, the Alberta Golden Bears, until 1994. For the next 13 years he was an ice hockey coach in the United Kingdom.

== Clubs ==
Club	Role	Years
Abbotsford Flyers	Player	1984-85
Delta Flyers	Player	1985-86
Victoria Cougars	Player	1986–87
Kelowna Packers	Player	1986-87
St. Albert Saints	Player	1987–89
U. of Alberta	Player	1989–94
Basingstoke Beavers	Player/Assistant Coach	1994/95
Milton Keynes Kings	Player/Head Coach	1995/96
Swindon IceLords	Player/Head Coach	1996/97
Guildford Flames	Player/Head Coach	1997–2005 - British National League
Guildford Flames	Head Coach	2005–07 - English Premier League
U. of Alberta	Assistant Coach	2007–08
U. of Alberta	Assistant Coach	2010–11
U. of Alberta	Head Coach	2011–12
U. of Alberta	General Manager	2012–present

Note: Marple could not play regularly after 2005 because of the EPL 4 import rule, therefore he could only play when other imports were injured.

== Playing career ==
Marple had his number 3 retired by Guildford. The Flames gained ten titles while Marple was head coach and general manager.

=== Statistics ===
			Regular season					Playoffs
Season	Team	League	GP	G	A	Pts	PIM	GP	G	A	Pts	PIM
1986–87	Victoria Cougars	WHL	3	0	0	0	7
1987–88	St. Albert Saints	AJHL	45	6	15	21	306
1988–89	St. Albert Saints	AJHL	statistics unavailable
1989–90	U. of Alberta	CIAU	33	6	7	13	27
1990–91	U. of Alberta	CIAU	34	3	4	7	57
1991–92	U. of Alberta	CIAU	42	3	5	8	74
1993–94	U. of Alberta	CIAU	28	4	4	8	38
1994–95	Basingstoke Beavers	BHL	23	3	6	9	109
1995–96	Milton Keynes Kings	BHL	1	0	0	0	6
1996–97	Swindon IceLords	BHL	22	1	8	9	20
1997–98	Guildford Flames	BNL	16	2	4	6	20
1998–99	Guildford Flames	BNL	3	0	0	0	6
1999–00	Guildford Flames	BNL	9	2	0	2	14
2000–01	Guildford Flames	BNL	40	0	5	5	130
2001–02	Guildford Flames	BNL	36	5	7	12	102	6	0	0	0	4
2002–03	Guildford Flames	BNL	27	1	6	7	104
2003–04	Guildford Flames	BNL	46	2	9	11	209
2004–05	Guildford Flames	BNL	11	1	2	3	12
2006–07	Guildford Flames	EPL	6	2	0	2	39

== General manager / coaching record and titles ==
Marple's coaching record at Guildford is as follows: 396 wins, 174 losses, 42 ties and overtime losses. His record during his time as GM is as follows: 213 wins, 55 losses.

Marple's titles for his clubs as head coach & or general manager are as follows:

Club	Year	Title/Cup
MK Kings (HC & GM)	1995–96	British Hockey League Div. 1
Swindon Ice Lords (HC & GM)	1996–97	British Premier League, British Premier League Play-Offs
Guildford Flames (HC & GM)	1997–98	British National League, British National League Play-Offs, British National League Southern Conference
Guildford Flames (HC & GM)	1998–99	Benson & Hedges Plate
Guildford Flames (HC & GM)	2000–01	ntl: Christmas Cup, British National League, British National League Playoffs
Guildford Flames (HC & GM)	2003–04	British National League Play-Offs
Guildford Flames (HC & GM)	2005–06	English Premier League
Guildford Flames (HC & GM)	2006–07	English Premier League Cup (Knockout Competition)
U of A (assistant coach)	2007-08	Canada West Champions & National Champions
U of A (GM only)	2012-13	Canada West Champions
U of A (GM only)	2013-14	Canada West Champions & National Champions
U of A (GM only)	2014-15	Canada West Champions & National Champions
U of A (GM only)	2016-17	Canada West Champions
U of A (GM only)	2017-18	Canada West Champions & National Champions
