= Guildford Flames =

Ice hockey team based in Guildford, Surrey, England

- City: Guildford, Surrey
- League: Elite Ice Hockey League
- Founded: 1992
- Home arena: Guildford Spectrum (capacity: 2,200)
- Colors: Navy, crimson, gold, white
- Owner: Sportfact Ltd
- Head coach: Paul Dixon
- Captain: Matt Alvaro
- Affiliates: Guildford Phoenix, NIHL 2 Guildford Lightning, WNIHL (Elite)

Championships
- British National League Titles: 2 (1997–98, 2000–01)
- English Premier League Titles: 4 (2005–06, 2007–08, 2011–12, 2012–13)
- British National League Playoff Championships: 3 (1998, 2001, 2004)

The Guildford Flames are a professional ice hockey team based in Guildford, Surrey. They play their home games in the Guildford Spectrum and compete in the top-tier of ice hockey in the United Kingdom, the Elite Ice Hockey League.

Founded in October 1992, the Flames originally played in the second-tier leagues of British hockey, first the British National League until 2004, and subsequently the English Premier Ice Hockey League until 2017. On 24 February 2017 it was announced that the Flames would become the 12th Elite Ice Hockey League team, joining from the 2017–18 season.

The team's head coach is Paul Dixon, who took over after Stan Marple retired in 2007.

== Formation ==
Barry Dow, an American who sponsored and owned the basketball team Guildford Kings and Bill Hurley established and owned the team as management – the two were new to the sport of ice hockey, and brought in Mike Urquhart as coach and Darrin Zinger as captain.

Key players signed for the first season included Canadians Sean Murphy and Dave McGahan due to their high scoring at Solent Vikings. In addition a number of British players including goaltender, Mike Kellond; forward, Danny O'Hanlon and defender, Gary Shearer.

The Flames' inaugural season began in October 1992; they began, unseeded, in the English League Division One. With the Guildford Spectrum not yet completed, the team had to train at Slough's facility. The Flames played their home games at Alexandra Palace until their new home ice was ready and played there for the first time on 23 January 1993.

When 23 January 1993 finally arrived and the Guildford Spectrum opened, the event was a big one. The area's paid-for newspaper The Surrey Advertiser described the local council's £28 million arena as "awesome". Guildford's first game at their new home showed a convincing win with Andy Sparks scoring the first goal at the Spectrum. The team went to the top of the Conference due to that game, a position they held onto for the whole season.

=== Elite League ===
The Guildford Flames were confirmed as an Elite League expansion team in February 2017, stepping up from the English Premier Ice Hockey League (EPIHL), and began play in the UK's top division at the start of the 2017–18 EIHL season.

The Flames finished in sixth in their first season (2017–18), followed by a fifth-placed finish in 2018–19 – a campaign in which they finished runners-up to the Belfast Giants in the Challenge Cup final.

Guildford were again in sixth when the 2019–20 EIHL season's remaining matches were cancelled in March 2020 due to the coronavirus pandemic. The play-offs were cancelled with only the Challenge Cup seeing a winner (the Sheffield Steelers) crowned.

Then, the 2020–21 Elite League season – originally scheduled for a revised start date of 5 December – was suspended on 15 September 2020 because of ongoing coronavirus pandemic restrictions. The EIHL board determined that the season was non-viable without supporters being permitted to attend matches and unanimously agreed to a suspension. The season was cancelled completely in February 2021.

In the 2021–22 EIHL season, Guildford finished the regular season in fifth place with a 25–25–4 record, reaching the quarter-finals of the Challenge Cup (losing 6–5 on aggregate to Nottingham Panthers) and the play-off semi-finals (beating Nottingham 7–6 on aggregate in the quarter-finals, before losing in the last four to Cardiff Devils 3–2). Guildford claimed third place by beating Dundee Stars 7–5 in the third/fourth place play-off.

The 2022–23 EIHL season proved to be even better for the Guildford Flames, propelled by a strong start to the campaign that saw the Flames top the league for much of the first half of the season, including at Christmas. Forwards Daniel Tedesco (80 points), captain Brett Ferguson (67 points) and Ryan Tait (62 points) led the way.

The team were neck and neck with eventual league champions the Belfast Giants, with Guildford finishing in 2nd place in the Elite League with a 40–12–2 record from 54 games, good for 82 points, just two behind the Giants. Belfast secured the title after a 6–1 win over the Flames at the SSE Arena on 1 April 2023.

In the Challenge Cup, Guildford reached the semi-finals, before an eventual 6–3 aggregate defeat – once again at the hands of the Belfast Giants. And in the play-offs, the Flames were on the end of an upset at the quarter-final stage, losing 7–6 at the hands of seventh seed the Nottingham Panthers in April 2023.

Guildford's second place league finish in the 2022–23 season saw them earn qualification for the 2023–24 IIHF Continental Cup. However, in May 2023, the club released a statement confirming they would decline their place in the competition.

The 2023–24 EIHL season saw the Flames maintain a record that kept them in the top half of the league table. On 13 March 2024, Guildford finished runners-up in the Challenge Cup final to the Sheffield Steelers, losing 3–1. Guildford ended the regular season in 5th with a 24–20–10 record, eventually losing in the play-off semi-finals to the Sheffield Steelers, 6–3. The Flames also lost the 3rd/4th play-off 7–5 to the Cardiff Devils.

In 2024–25, Guildford finished 6th in the league standings, thus once again qualifying for the end of season play-offs. The Flames regular season record was 25–22–7. The Flames were eliminated at the quarter-final stage by eventual champions the Nottingham Panthers, 8–6 on aggregate.

== Club honours ==
=== Domestic ===
Benson & Hedges Cup

- 1996–97, 1998–99

British National League

- Champions: 1997–98, 2000–01
- Playoffs: 1997–98, 2000–01, 2003–04
- Southern Conference: 1997–98

Challenge Cup

- Runners-up: 2018–19, 2023–24

Christmas Cup

- 2000–01

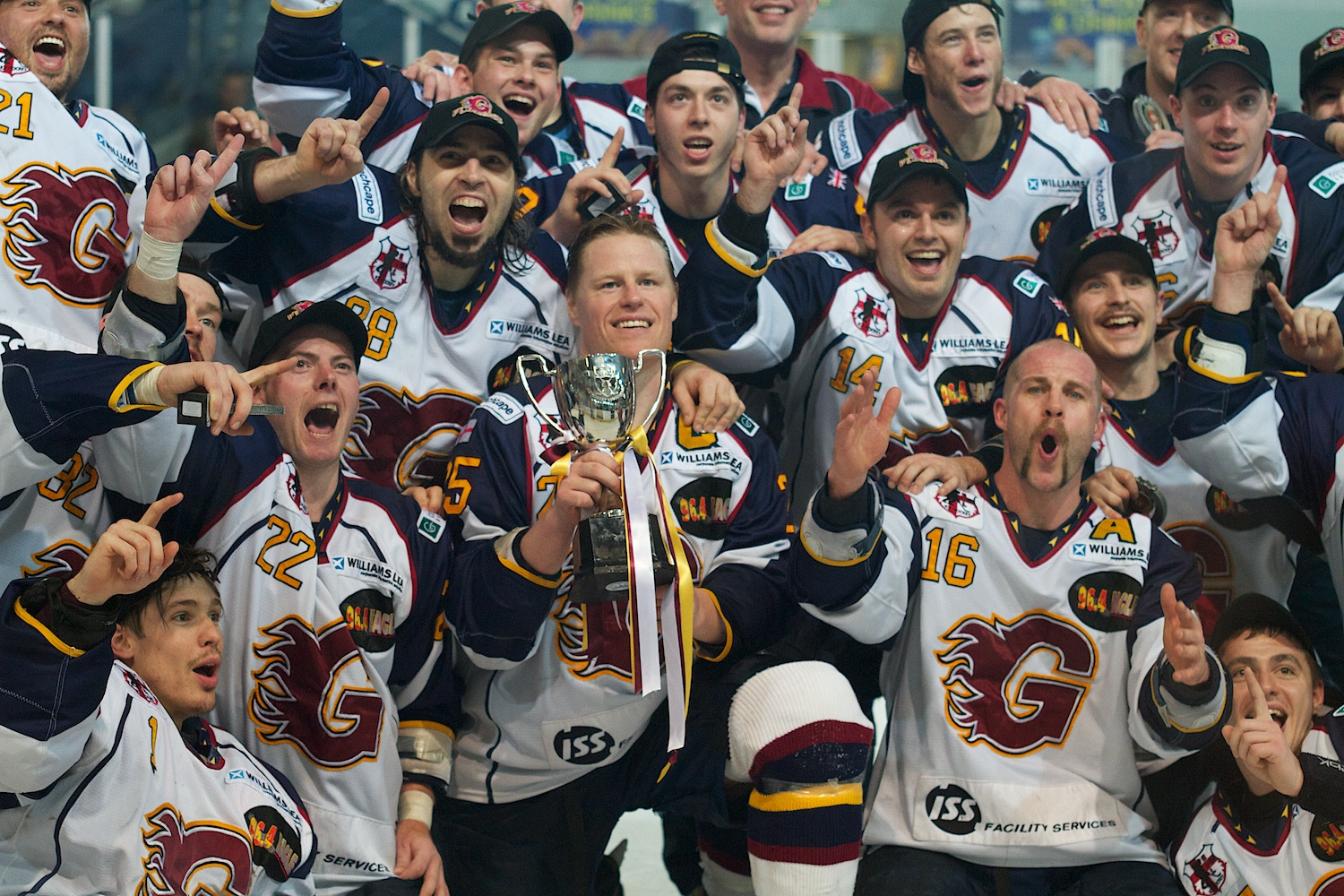
The team celebrates winning the 2011 Playoff Championships

English Premier Ice Hockey League

- League: 2005–06, 2007–08, 2011–12, 2012–13
- Playoffs: 2010–11
- Cup: 2006–07, 2009–10, 2011–12, 2012–13, 2015–16

Patton Conference

- 2018–19

=== Individual ===
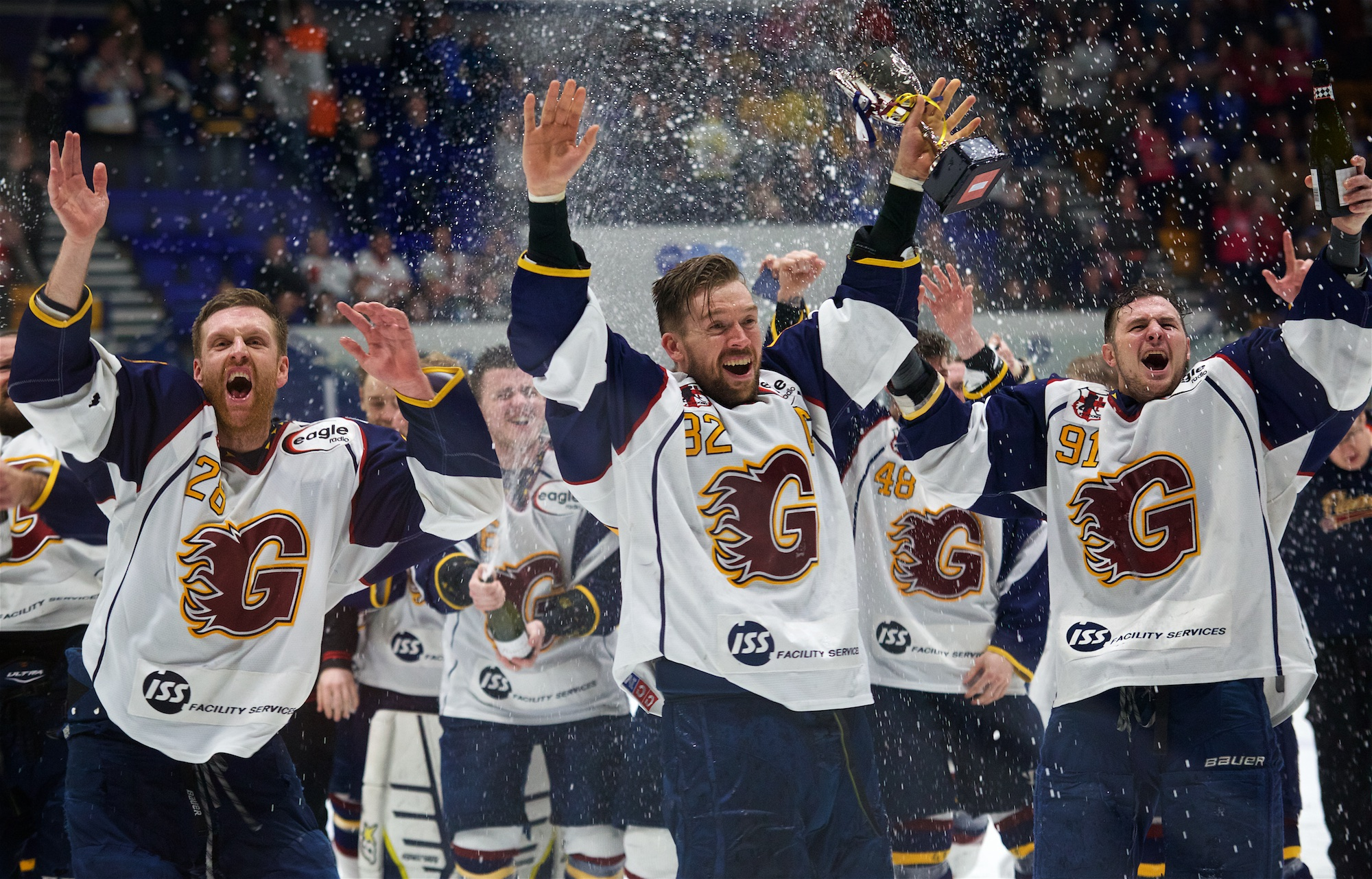
The team celebrates winning the 2016 Playoff Championships

EIHL All-Stars First Team

- 2017–18: Jesse Craige
- 2021–22: Jamal Watson
- 2022–23: Daniel Tedesco

EIHL All-Stars Second Team

- 2017–18: Calle Ackered
- 2017–18: John Dunbar
- 2018–19: Calle Ackered
- 2018–19: Jesse Craige
- 2022–23: Brett Ferguson
- 2022–23: Ben O'Connor
- 2025–26: Mathieu Gosselin

== Team logo and jersey ==
The current team jerseys, for both away and home.

The team logo is very similar to that of the Calgary Flames of the NHL. The team jerseys mirror those used by a former NHL team, Atlanta Thrashers from 1999 to 2006 (with logos replaced and advertisements added).

== Current squad ==
Squad for 2026–27 Elite League season

Netminders
No.		Player	Catches	Acquired	Place of Birth	Joined from	Press Release
1	(United States)	Brad Arvanitis	L	2026	Holliston, United States	Maine Mariners, ECHL
30	(England)	Adam Long	L	2021	Crewe, England	Haringey Huskies, NIHL 2
40	(Canada) (Italy)	Justin Fazio	L	2025	Sarnia, Canada	Asiago Hockey 1935, AlpsHL

Defencemen
No.		Player	Shoots	Acquired	Place of Birth	Joined from	Press Release
5	(Canada)	Jonathan Racine	L	2025	Montreal, Canada	CSM Corona Brasov, Erste Liga
8	(Canada)	Dustyn McFaul	L	2026	Waterdown, Canada	Fort Wayne Komets, ECHL
26	(United States)	Nate Kallen	R	2026	San Diego, United States	Vienna Capitals, ICEHL
45	(Canada) (United Kingdom)	Travis Brown A	L	2024	Winnipeg, Canada	Belfast Giants, EIHL
59	(United States)	Jake Willets	R	2026	Erie, United States	Reading Royals, ECHL
71	(Canada)	Karl Boudrias	L	2026	Châteauguay, Canada	Belfast Giants, EIHL
77	(Canada)	Jordan Power	L	2026	Ottawa, Canada	Coventry Blaze, EIHL

Forwards
No.		Player	Position	Acquired	Place of Birth	Joined from	Press Release
13	(Canada)	Tyler Busch A	C	2025	Lloydminster, Canada	Cardiff Devils, EIHL
14	(Canada)	Alexandre Lavoie	C/RW	2026	Anjou, Canada	Dragons de Rouen, Ligue Magnus
16	(Canada)	Jack Jacome A	RW	2024	Caledon, Canada	Rungsted Seier Capital, Metal Ligaen
19	(England)	Elliot Lewis	C	2025	Southampton, England	Milton Keynes Lightning, NIHL
24	(England)	Zack Milton	F	2025	Ashford, England	Basingstoke Bison, NIHL
27	(United States)	Chase Gresock	F	2026	Powell, United States	Dragons de Rouen, Ligue Magnus
28	(Canada)	Matt Alvaro C	LW/C	2023	Toronto, Canada	Fort Wayne Komets, ECHL
63	(Canada)	Mathieu Gosselin	RW/LW	2025	Quebec City, Canada	Cincinnati Cyclones, ECHL
67	(Canada)	Justin Ducharme	RW/LW	2026	Mirabel, Canada	Fife Flyers, EIHL
68	(Canada)	Brett Neumann	C/RW	2026	Toronto, Canada	Glasgow Clan, EIHL
91	(England) (United Kingdom)	Joshua Waller	LW	2024	Reading, England	Cardiff Devils, EIHL
95	(Canada)	Cole Sanford	RW/C	2026	Vernon, Canada	Cardiff Devils, EIHL
98	(England)	Samuel Talbot	F	2023	London, England	Milton Keynes Lightning, NIHL

Team Staff
No.		Name	Position	Place of Birth	Joined from	Press Release
N/A	(England)	Paul Dixon	Head coach/GM	Sunderland, England	Appointed in 2007
N/A	(England)	Andrew Hemmings	Assistant coach	Guildford, England	Appointed in 2022
N/A	(England)	Matty Simpson	Equipment manager	England	Appointed in 2024

Recent departures
No.		Player	Position	Acquired	Leaving For	Press Release
6	(England)	Ben Solder	D	2025	Fife Flyers, EIHL
7	(Canada)	Sean Comrie	D	2025	Norfolk Admirals, ECHL
17	(Canada)	Tyler Preziuso	RW	2025	Wichita Thunder, ECHL
19	(United States)	Charlie Curti A	D	2024	Herlev Eagles, Metal Ligaen
20	(Canada)	Marcus Tesink	D	2023	Trois-Rivières Lions, ECHL
27	(Canada)	Josh Nixon	RW	2025	Indy Fuel, ECHL
29	(United States)	Nick Seitz	F	2025	Gothiques d'Amiens, Ligue Magnus
42	(Canada)	Jamal Watson	D	2025	ECDC Memmingen Indians, DEL2
86	(Canada)	Jake Coughler	C	2024	Selber Wölfe, Oberliga
88	(England) (United Kingdom)	Lewis Hook	LW	2023	Manchester Storm, EIHL
93	(Canada)	Ethan Strang	F	2024	Atlanta Gladiators, ECHL
96	(Canada)	Cole Ully	LW	2025	TBC

== Retired numbers ==
The retired numbers at the Guildford Flames are:

- 3 Stan Marple
- 10 Ryan Campbell
- 11 Fred Perlini
- 9 Terry Kurtenbach
- 15 Andy Sparks
- 22 Paul Dixon

== Team captains ==
- 1992–94 – Darren Zinger
- 1994–99 – Paul Thompson
- 1999-00 – Karry Biette
- 2000–01 – Wayne Crawford
- 2001–07 – Paul Dixon
- 2007–09 – Ricky Plant
- 2009–10 – Rob Lamey
- 2010–15 – David Longstaff
- 2015–17 – Jeremy Lundin
- 2017–20 – Jesse Craige
- 2021–25 – Brett Ferguson
- 2025–Current – Matt Alvaro
