= Elite Ice Hockey League =

Ice hockey league in the United Kingdom, formed in 2003

- Current season, competition or edition: 2026–27 EIHL season
- Sport: Ice hockey
- Founded: 2003
- First season: 2003–04
- No. of teams: 10
- Continent: Europe
- Most recent champion: Belfast Giants (2025–26)
- Most titles: Belfast Giants (8 titles)
- Broadcaster: None
- Domestic cups: Challenge Cup – Nottingham Panthers (9 titles)
- Related competitions: Play-offs – Most wins (EIHL era) Nottingham Panthers & Sheffield Steelers with (6 titles each)
- Website: www.eliteleague.co.uk

The Elite Ice Hockey League (EIHL) or, for sponsorship reasons, the Motorpoint Elite League, is an ice hockey league in the United Kingdom. Formed in 2003 following the demise of the Ice Hockey Superleague, it is the highest level of ice hockey competition in the United Kingdom.

The league operates three competitions for members; the British Championship play-offs determine the national champion for the season, following a regular season league competition for which separate champions are also crowned, and which selects and seeds the teams in the play-offs. Finally, a stand-alone cup competition, the Challenge Cup, is also held annually including only EIHL teams, beginning with the group stages followed by a knock-out format. In effect, the play-off final, regular end-of-season table and Challenge Cup final crown the British or National Champions, the EIHL League champions and the Cup champions respectively.

The league currently consists of one division of ten teams, with representation from all four nations of the United Kingdom – the only league in any sport to do so. Five of the teams as of 2025 are situated in England, while the other five are spread throughout the other nations; three in Scotland, and one each in Wales and Northern Ireland. In twenty completed seasons the league championship has been won by five different teams, while the play-offs have crowned six different teams as national champions.

The level below the Elite League is the National Ice Hockey League. There is no promotion and relegation, but historically teams have moved between the two leagues by election for competitive and financial reasons, by agreement of the respective leagues' management.

Internationally, teams from the EIHL can participate in the International Ice Hockey Federation's annual Champions Hockey League (CHL), competing for the European Trophy. Participation is based on the strength of the various leagues in Europe (excluding the European/Asian Kontinental Hockey League). Going into the 2022–23 CHL season, the EIHL was ranked the No. 8 league in Europe, allowing them to send their top team to compete in the CHL.

The day-to-day operation of the league is overseen by a chairman (as of 2023, Tony Smith), a director of hockey operations (Michael Hicks), media manager / hockey operations (Luke Fisher), head of commercial operations (Mark Brooks), and a board of directors. Disciplinary matters are handled by EIHL Hockey Operation's Department of Player Safety (DOPS).

== History ==
=== Early years (2003–2010) ===
British ice hockey's structure underwent a major reorganisation in 1996. The British Hockey League (the highest senior competition since 1982, featuring the top two divisions of the sport) was disbanded and replaced by the Ice Hockey Superleague (top tier) and British National League (second tier).

The loss of the Cardiff Devils and the Newcastle Jesters in 2001 reduced the membership of the Superleague to seven; and when the Manchester Storm and the Scottish Eagles folded within a week of one another at the beginning of the 2002–03 season, there were just five remaining teams. In December 2002, the Bracknell Bees announced their intention to resign from the league to join the BNL at the end of the season; and uncertainty surrounded the future of the London Knights and their London Arena home; which ultimately led to the Knights folding in 2003. Owing a large debt to Ice Hockey UK and facing the prospect of having only three members, the league placed itself into liquidation on 30 April 2003.

The three remaining clubs (Belfast Giants, Nottingham Panthers, and Sheffield Steelers) began considering the formation of a new league with a lower wage cap and larger commitment to British players to attract other clubs into joining them. In the weeks that followed they were joined by the Basingstoke Bison, Cardiff Devils, and Coventry Blaze of the British National League and two new organisations, from London and Manchester. A team based in Glasgow was also planned, but did not come to fruition. The new league met considerable opposition from the British National League and the governing body Ice Hockey UK. The IHUK wished for the remaining Superleague clubs to integrate themselves into the BNL and initially refused to grant the new league affiliation. The Superleague clubs were reluctant to join the predominantly British-trained league after several years of playing in an import-dominated league where British players were seldom able to step up to the standard of their North American and European counterparts. The Elite League instead preferred a twelve import limit with the rest of the team being British-trained players.

The refusal to grant affiliation caused a bitter row that showed little sign of being resolved. Despite not having the support of the governing body, the new league continued their plans. No affiliation would have meant that the clubs would have problems attaining work permits for their signings and finding officials to referee their matches. The row also threatened the future of the Nottingham Panthers, as the National Ice Centre were reluctant to allow a team from an unaffiliated league to hire their arena. The issue was resolved in August 2003 when the Panthers and the NIC announced an icetime agreement. The EIHL finally gained affiliation in August 2003, with only weeks to go before the beginning of the new season.

The new league began on 12 September 2003, when the Sheffield Steelers, who went on to become the inaugural league champions, defeated the newly formed London Racers 6–1 at Alexandra Palace. The Racers endured a difficult first season, moving to a different rink only weeks into the season and having to wait 40 games to record a win, a 3–0 victory over the Cardiff Devils. The Racers finished the season with 10 points, 38 points behind second-to-last Basingstoke. The other new team, the Manchester Phoenix, fared slightly better, qualifying for the playoff finals after finishing sixth in the league, where they were defeated 6–1 by Nottingham in the semifinal. The club played at the 17,500 capacity MEN Arena which had been home to the Manchester Storm, but Phoenix crowds averaged 2,250, well below the break-even mark of 3,000. Late in the season, the Phoenix choose to play a game at IceSheffield rather than pay the considerable cost of hiring the arena for a mid-week game (which usually had lower attendances). In the close season they allowed fans to vote on the option of either suspending playing operations while a new rink was constructed or playing in exile away from Manchester while a new rink was built. Supporters opted to suspend playing operations pending the construction of a new facility.

The second season of the EIHL saw a series of games between the EIHL clubs and the members of the BNL. In addition to three home games and three away games against their Elite opponents, each club also played one home game and one away game against the BNL clubs in crossover match-ups. Results in these crossover games counted towards a team's points tally. The NHL lock-out also saw a number of NHL players join British clubs. Coventry won the League Title, The Challenge Cup and the Playoffs, winning the championship with an overtime victory over the Nottingham Panthers, whilst Belfast won the EIHL-BNL Crossover League.

The crossover games with the BNL clubs were seen by many to be the first stage towards an amalgamation of the two organizations into one league; essentially reforming the original BHL. However, early in the season it was revealed that two teams from the BNL, the Edinburgh Capitals and Newcastle Vipers, were seeking to resign from the BNL and join the EIHL; preferring the standard of hockey that the EIHL had to offer. A withdrawal of these clubs would leave the BNL with only five remaining participating teams. This situation led to the resigning teams temporarily withdrawing their Elite League applications and entering into collective discussions on the entire BNL joining the EIHL instead. The Elite League offered the BNL clubs invitations to join the EIHL structure, which were declined by the remaining teams due to unfavourable terms. Subsequently, the Capitals and Vipers both resubmitted individual applications to the Elite League; both of which were accepted. This ultimately led to the dissolution of the BNL, with the five remaining teams joining the next tier of British hockey (which consisted of the English Premier Ice Hockey League in England and the Scottish National League in Scotland).

With the Edinburgh Capitals and Newcastle Vipers becoming the ninth and tenth members of the league, the 2005–06 season began with nine clubs (Manchester had opted to take another season out with no rink yet constructed). However, in November 2005, the London Racers withdrew their team from competition and immediately ceased operations. From their formation the Racers had suffered problems finding a rink with comparable facilities to those of their rivals and they had maintained only a very small fan base. The club had made the Lee Valley Ice Centre their home after playing only a small number of games at the Alexandra Palace in their first season. The facilities were very basic, seating only 900 people with an overall capacity of barely 1,000. In November 2005, during a game against the Nottingham Panthers; Panthers player Blaž Emeršič suffered a serious facial injury after colliding with a protruding object in the boards. Further concerns were raised when a game against the Sheffield Steelers was abandoned after a piece of plexiglas shattered in an irregular manner, injuring a spectator. When a similar event took place during practice a few days later; the Racers management began to question seriously the safety of the rink. With the Ice Centre unable to ensure the safety of players and spectators at Elite League games, the Racers were forced to suspend team operations effective immediately.

In January 2006, the Manchester Phoenix were granted planning permission to construct a new rink in Altrincham. A few weeks later, the Cardiff Devils also received planning permission for the construction of a new rink. The Wales National Ice Rink was earmarked for demolition and a campaign for the council to provide a new facility proved successful. With both clubs confirming their intent to take part the following season, speculation began about the possible inclusion of a tenth team to replace the London Racers. After the season was over, rumours about the possible admission of either Hull or Dundee became more and more widespread. On 22 June 2006, the Hull Stingrays were formally elected into the Elite Ice Hockey League as the tenth active member.

In June 2006, the EIHL announced the adoption of the "zero tolerance" interpretation of the rules with regard to holding, hooking and interference implemented in the National Hockey League during the 2005–06 season. These rules had proved highly successful in the NHL, increasing the pace of the game and leading to a rise in spectator numbers.

On 25 August 2006, the Elite League announced a sponsorship deal with the low cost airline bmibaby. The agreement saw the company's name incorporated into the league's title and the airline's branding at each of the league's ten arenas. The deal was intended to last for seven seasons, but ended prematurely during the 2008–09 season.

On 30 April 2009, the Manchester Phoenix announced that they would withdraw from the league, and play instead in the English Premier Ice Hockey League, due to cost issues. This news followed the announcement that the Basingstoke Bison were also leaving to play in the EPL for the 2009–10 season.

=== League expands and changes (2010–2020) ===
After losing two teams at the end of the 2008–09 season the Elite League was boosted by a new franchise joining the league. The Braehead Clan were announced as the ninth team for the 2010–11 season. On 27 April 2010, the Dundee Stars were unanimously accepted into the League by the EIHL board as the tenth team.

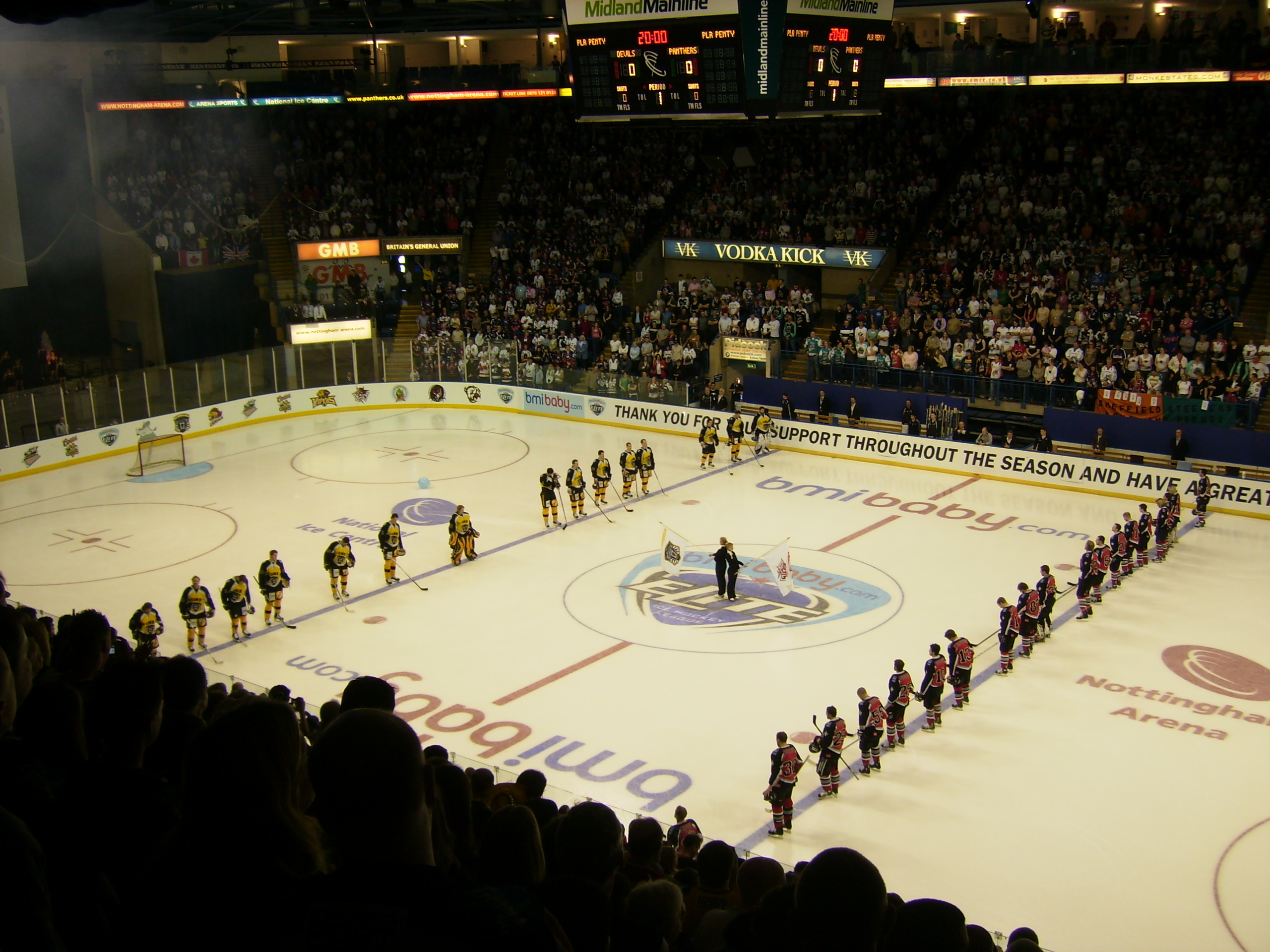
Nottingham Panthers vs Cardiff Devils at the 2010–11 play-off final

The Hull Stingrays withdrew from the League on 11 August 2010, announced via the club's official website, and later confirmed on the BBC's site. However, after a takeover from the Coventry Blaze on 17 August 2010, the Hull Stingrays confirmed that they would indeed be participating in the league for the 2010–11 season. The Stingrays again withdrew, on 24 June 2015, as the club announced on its official website that it has been placed into liquidation.

From the 2012–13 season onwards, the league has consisted of two conferences; each consisting of five teams. These are the Erhardt Conference and the Gardiner Conference. These can roughly be split into north and south, with the Erhardt featuring the teams from Belfast, Cardiff, Coventry, Nottingham, and Sheffield; and the Gardiner featuring the teams from Dundee, Edinburgh, Fife, and Glasgow along with Hull Stingrays until 2015, and their replacements Manchester Storm from 2015 onwards.

On 27 April 2017 it was announced that the Milton Keynes Lightning and Guildford Flames were joining for the start of the 2017–18 season and that the league schedule would be increased to 56 games in the regular season with three new conferences of four teams.

Conference 1 consisted of the Braehead Clan, Dundee Stars, Edinburgh Capitals and Fife Flyers known as the Scottish Conference.

Conference 2 consisted of the Coventry Blaze, Guildford Flames, Manchester Storm and Milton Keynes Lightning known as the Southern Conference.

Conference 3 consisted of the Belfast Giants, Cardiff Devils, Nottingham Panthers and Sheffield Steelers known as the Arena Teams. This meant that teams would play teams in their own conference eight times (four home and four away) totaling 24 games and play the other conference's teams four times (two home and two away) totaling 32 games, giving the league a total of 56 games.

In April 2018, when the Murrayfield Ice Rink asked for bidders for the ice time at the arena, the Edinburgh Capitals and Murrayfield Racers (a newly formed team) bid for the rights with the Racers winning the opportunity. The Racers asked for permission to join the EIHL, but on 30 April the league refused their application and they subsequently joined the Scottish National League (SNL).

On 4 May, the EIHL released a statement explaining that they would have to move forward without the Edinburgh Capitals with a board meeting on 22 May to discuss the league future format and decide on any clubs wishing to participate in place of Edinburgh.

After the conclusion of the 2018–19 season, the Milton Keynes Lightning officially left the EIHL after just two seasons in the league and moved to the newly created National Ice Hockey League (NIHL), returning the number of teams to 10. The three conference format was also scrapped.

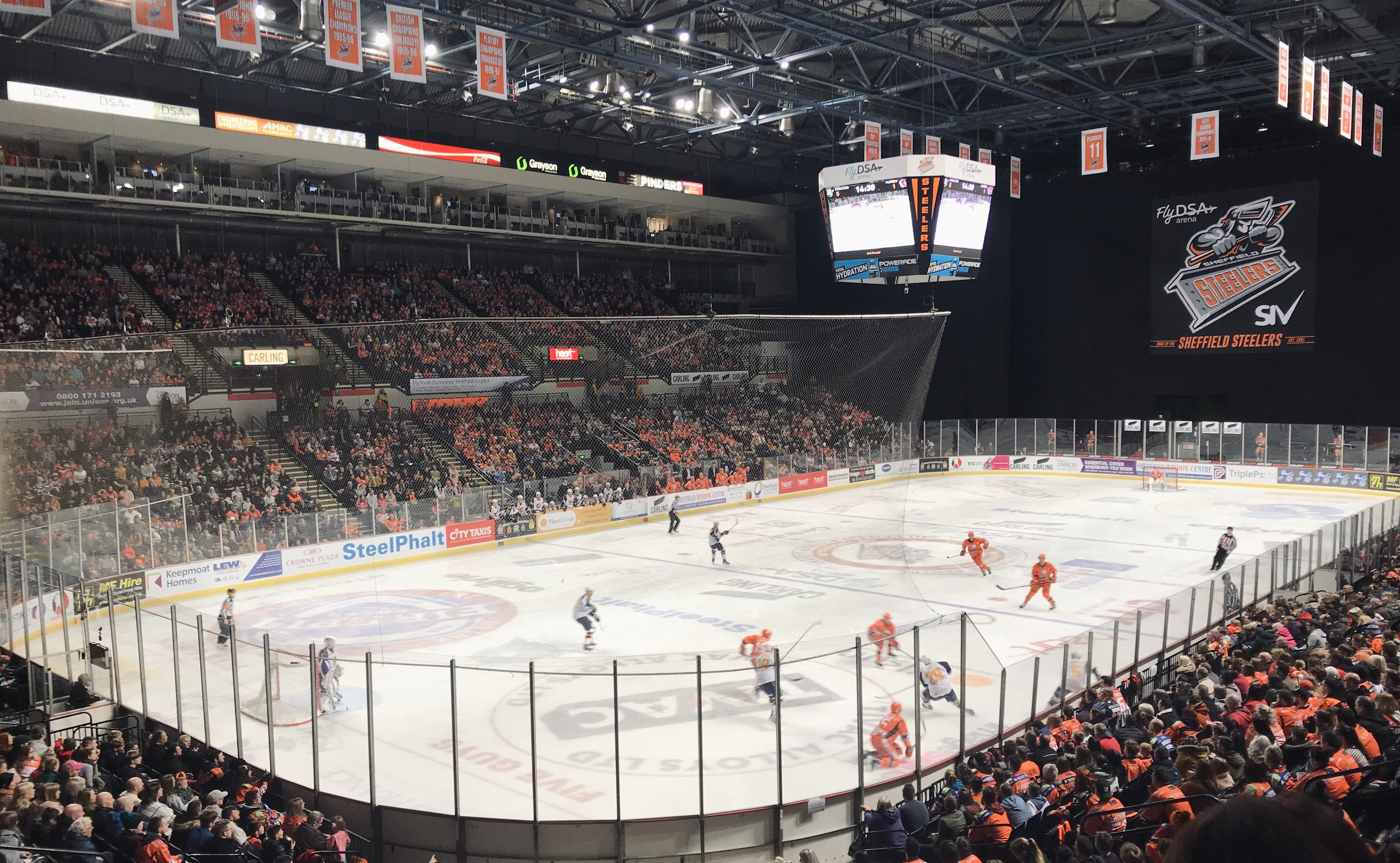
Sheffield Steelers vs Guildford Flames during the 2019–20 season

=== Recent years (2020–present) ===
The 2019–20 EIHL season was cancelled in March 2020 due to the COVID-19 pandemic. Only the Challenge Cup (won by Sheffield Steelers) was awarded with both the league and play-offs cancelled.

The 2020–21 EIHL season, originally scheduled for a September start, was suspended indefinitely on 15 September 2020, due to ongoing coronavirus restrictions and continuing social distancing which made the league season a non-starter.

While there were tentative plans for a shortened league season, featuring a handful of sides to potentially begin play in January 2021, this idea – and the prospect of a 2020–21 season – were shelved by the league in February 2021 due to concerns around funding.

Then, in March 2021, the Elite League announced that four of the English teams (Coventry, Manchester, Nottingham and Sheffield) would take part in the 'Elite Series' between April–May 2021, a total of 24 games to be played at Nottingham's Motorpoint Arena, culminating in a best-of-three play-off final series. Nottingham claimed the trophy by virtue of a 2–0 series win over the Sheffield Steelers in the final, winning game one 5–3 and game two 5–2.

In the 2021–22 EIHL season, the first full season to be completed since 2018–19 due to the impacts of the Covid pandemic, the Belfast Giants won both the Elite League title and the Challenge Cup, while the Cardiff Devils won the play-offs.

In May 2022, all ten Elite League clubs agreed to increase the gameday roster size from 19 to 20 – to take effect from the 2022–23 season. Import numbers in a gameday squad were once again capped at 14.

In April 2023, the league announced that the end of season play-off final weekend would continue to be played at Nottingham's Motorpoint Arena until at least 2029.

In the 2022–23 EIHL season, the Belfast Giants became the first team since Nottingham in 2013 to complete the Elite League grand slam, after winning the league title, Challenge Cup and play-offs. The Giants finished ahead of second placed Guildford in the league, and defeated the Fife Flyers and Cardiff Devils in the Challenge Cup and play-off finals respectively.

The following season, 2023–24, the Sheffield Steelers won their first league title since 2016, the Challenge Cup and the play-offs to complete a grand slam of their own. It was Sheffield's first grand slam in the Elite League era and first since 2001.

In May 2024, the Elite League announced a new Challenge Cup format, taking effect from the 2024–25 season. All 10 clubs agreed to scrap the cup quarter-finals, with a group stage feeding straight into the semi-finals.

In the 2024–25 season, the Elite League title race went down to the final weekend and involved the Belfast Giants, Sheffield Steelers and Nottingham Panthers, who all mathematically could come away with the trophy. All teams had played 52/54 matches and were within 4 points. However, Belfast (the league leaders and favourites coming in to the weekend) clinched their seventh league title with a 4–3 overtime win over Nottingham on 6 April 2025. Meanwhile, Dundee took the eighth and final play-off spot.

The 2025-26 season saw the Belfast Giants claim back to back Elite League titles with a nine point lead over the runner-up Cardiff devils. The Nottingham Panthers won their second IIHF Continental Cup title with a 4-2 win over Torpedo Ust-Kamenogorsk in the Motorpoint Arena. They then went on to defeat the Coventry Blaze 3-2 in overtime to win their first Challenge Cup title since 2016. The Playoffs saw two upset results as the league champions, Belfast, were eliminated by the eighth seed, Glasgow Clan, following a shootout victory that saw them win 3-2 on aggregate. The reigning playoff champions, Nottingham, were also eliminated in a shootout to the Manchester Storm who won 6-5 on aggregate. The Cardiff Devils won the 2026 playoff title after defeating the Glasgow Clan 3-1 in the semifinals and defeating the Sheffield Steelers 5-2 in the grand final for their first piece of domestic silverware since 2022.

On 27 April 2026, the Manchester Storm announced their return to the AO Arena for the 2026/27, marking a historic moment for the club, league, and British ice hockey as a whole. On 9 July 2026, the League announced that Motorpoint, sponsor of the Nottingham Panthers ice rink, was to become the League's "principal commercial partner" for the next five seasons

== Structure ==
Several competitions fall under the jurisdiction of the Elite League.

Up until the end of the 2018–19 season, the league consisted of three conferences, the results of which were compiled in one league table:

- Gardiner Conference: Dundee Stars, Fife Flyers, and Glasgow Clan
- Patton Conference: Coventry Blaze, Guildford Flames, and Manchester Storm.
- Erhardt Conference: Belfast Giants, Cardiff Devils, Nottingham Panthers, and Sheffield Steelers.

Teams played each other six times (three home, three away), making for a 60-game regular season, but after the departure of Milton Keynes Lightning in 2019, the conference system was scrapped for the first time since 2011–12. Each team now plays 54 games.

Two points are awarded for a win and one for an overtime or penalty shootout defeat. Overtime consists of five minutes of three-on-three hockey and ends immediately if a goal is scored. The team that has most points at the end of the regular season is declared champion.

The playoffs are contested by the teams with the best regular season records. The winner is crowned the champion of the British Championship. The number of teams competing in the playoffs has varied. However, since the 2006–07 season, the top eight teams of the regular season have qualified for the quarter-finals, with their league position determining their seeding. All quarter-finals are two-legged ties. Both the semi-finals and the final take place over a single weekend in April at the National Ice Centre in Nottingham.

The Challenge Cup has taken a number of different formats, ranging from a table formed from the results of designated league fixtures to groups of four teams playing on a round-robin basis at the beginning of the season. During some seasons, Elite League games have also been classed as Challenge Cup games and points counted for both. The semi-finals and final are two-legged games, the winner being the team with the highest aggregate score at the end of the second game.

== Clubs ==
Locations of the EIHL 2024–25 teams

Since 2019 and the departure of Edinburgh Capitals and Milton Keynes Lightning from the league, the competition has consisted of the same ten teams in the longest period of member stability since the league's inception.

EIHL clubs
Club	Established	Location	Venue	Capacity	First season
Manchester Storm	2015	Manchester	AO Arena	21,000	2015
Sheffield Steelers	1991	Sheffield	Utilita Arena Sheffield (Note: The Sheffield Steelers use iceSheffield as a secondary venue for some matches.)	9,368	2003
Belfast Giants	2000	Belfast	The O2 Belfast (Note: The Belfast Giants use the Dundonald International Ice Bowl as a secondary venue for some matches.)	8,700	2003
Nottingham Panthers	1946	Nottingham	Motorpoint Arena Nottingham	7,500	2003
Glasgow Clan	2010	Glasgow (Renfrew)	Braehead Arena	4,000	2010
Fife Flyers	1938	Fife (Kirkcaldy)	Fife Ice Arena	3,525	2011
Cardiff Devils	1986	Cardiff	Vindico Arena	3,250	2003
Coventry Blaze	1965	Coventry	Planet Ice Coventry	3,000	2003
Dundee Stars	2001	Dundee	Dundee Ice Arena	2,700	2010
Guildford Flames	1992	Guildford	Guildford Spectrum	2,200	2017

Since 2003, seven teams have left the league.

Former clubs
Club	Established	Location	Final venue	Capacity	Years in EIHL
Basingstoke Bison	1988	Basingstoke	Planet Ice Basingstoke	2,000	2003–2009
Edinburgh Capitals	1998	Edinburgh	Murrayfield Ice Rink	3,800	2005–2018
Hull Stingrays	2003	Hull	Hull Arena	2,000	2006–2015
London Racers	2003	London (Waltham Forest)	Lee Valley Ice Centre (Note: The London Racers originally played their matches at Alexandra Palace.)	1,200	2003–2005
Manchester Phoenix	2003	Altrincham	Planet Ice Altrincham (Note: The Manchester Phoenix originally played their matches at Manchester Arena.)	2,440	2003–2004, 2006–2009
Milton Keynes Lightning	2002	Milton Keynes	Planet Ice Milton Keynes	2,800	2017–2019
Newcastle Vipers	2002	Newcastle (Whitley Bay)	Whitley Bay Ice Rink (Note: The Newcastle Vipers originally played their matches at Newcastle Arena.)	3,200	2005–2011

=== Potential future clubs ===
Wayne Scholes, owner of the Telford Tigers (currently in the National Ice Hockey League), has stated that his organisation does not have any immediate plans to make the step up, but has not ruled out the possibility of joining the EIHL in the future, saying that "We have had conversations with the Elite League before but they have to invite you. You can't approach them. It is one of those things where they want to see that you have got two or three years of really good solid success. They want to see that it is sustainable and that you are up to a certain standard, and then they will reach out. At that point, it's a discussion that we will have but right now we are pretty happy where we are."

In April 2025, plans were unveiled for a new €190 million 5,000-seat indoor arena in Cherrywood, Dublin, Ireland, that would have two olympic sized ice rinks and be a training centre for elite athletes. This project aims to bring the first professional ice hockey team to the Republic of Ireland. The "Prime Arena" is working with the Belfast Giants, the National Hockey League, the EIHL and the Olympic Federation of Ireland to make this project a reality. On 31 January 2026, the Irish Ice Hockey Association (IIHA) officially endorsed the project and that they look "forward to continuing to engage constructively with all stakeholders as the project progresses".

On 4 November 2025, Cardiff Devils Managing Director, Todd Kelman, said on the official Cardiff Devils podcast that "In the next 3-5 years, you might see two more teams in this league, potentially three."

== EIHL Champions by season ==
The following table sets out the League champions, National champions and Challenge Cup winners of the EIHL era only. Several previous top-tier leagues, such as the Sekonda Super League have also existed, in which some EIHL clubs competed successfully, and the end-of-season play-offs and Challenge Cup both have a long history prior to the founding of the EIHL, again feature many of the teams currently in EIHL.

Only four teams have won a domestic grand slam in the EIHL era; Coventry Blaze in 2004–05, Nottingham Panthers in 2012–13, Belfast Giants in 2022–23 and Sheffield Steelers in 2023–24. By contrast, teams have come within one match of a treble on no less than 13 occasions, beginning with the very first season when Panthers denied Sheffield Steelers by the odd goal in seven in the Challenge Cup final, and including the four completed seasons before last where Belfast Giants twice and Cardiff Devils twice, have been denied a 'Grand Slam' by losing in either the Challenge Cup or play-off final. Although dominated as might be expected by the English teams that represent the majority of the clubs in the league (winning 34 of 55 available trophies up to 2023), the sole entrants from Northern Ireland and Wales, Belfast (16 trophies) and Cardiff (eight trophies), have both enjoyed significant success across all competitions in the EIHL era. In 2023 Fife Flyers became the first Scottish team in the EIHL era to reach a major final, losing 9–3 to Belfast Giants in the Challenge Cup final.

Teams in italics no longer in EIHL:

Season	Regular Season	Playoffs			Challenge Cup		
Season	Regular Season	Winners	Score	Runners-up	Winners	Score	Runners-up
2003–04	Sheffield Steelers	Sheffield Steelers	2–1	Nottingham Panthers	Nottingham Panthers	4–3 (Agg)	Sheffield Steelers
2004–05	Coventry Blaze	Coventry Blaze	2–1	Nottingham Panthers	Coventry Blaze	11–5 (Agg)	Cardiff Devils
2005–06	Belfast Giants	Newcastle Vipers	2–1	Sheffield Steelers	Cardiff Devils	4–4 (Agg) 1–0 (PSO)	Coventry Blaze
2006–07	Coventry Blaze	Nottingham Panthers	2–1	Cardiff Devils	Coventry Blaze	9–4 (Agg)	Sheffield Steelers
2007–08	Coventry Blaze	Sheffield Steelers	2–0	Coventry Blaze	Nottingham Panthers	9–7 (Agg)	Sheffield Steelers
2008–09	Sheffield Steelers	Sheffield Steelers	2–0	Nottingham Panthers	Belfast Giants	6–5 (Agg)	Manchester Phoenix
2009–10	Coventry Blaze	Belfast Giants	2–2; 1–0 (PSO)	Cardiff Devils	Nottingham Panthers	8–7 (Agg)	Cardiff Devils
2010–11	Sheffield Steelers	Nottingham Panthers	5–4	Cardiff Devils	Nottingham Panthers	4–3 (Ag)	Belfast Giants
2011–12	Belfast Giants	Nottingham Panthers	2–0	Cardiff Devils	Nottingham Panthers	10–4 (Agg)	Belfast Giants
2012–13	Nottingham Panthers	Nottingham Panthers	3–2	Belfast Giants	Nottingham Panthers	5–3 (Agg)	Sheffield Steelers
2013–14	Belfast Giants	Sheffield Steelers	3–2	Belfast Giants	Nottingham Panthers	6–6 (Agg) 1–0 (PSO)	Belfast Giants
2014–15	Sheffield Steelers	Coventry Blaze	4–2	Sheffield Steelers	Cardiff Devils	2–1	Sheffield Steelers
2015–16	Sheffield Steelers	Nottingham Panthers	2–0	Coventry Blaze	Nottingham Panthers	1–0 (OT)	Cardiff Devils
2016–17	Cardiff Devils	Sheffield Steelers	6–5	Cardiff Devils	Cardiff Devils	3–2	Sheffield Steelers
2017–18	Cardiff Devils	Cardiff Devils	3–1	Sheffield Steelers	Belfast Giants	6–3	Cardiff Devils
2018–19	Belfast Giants	Cardiff Devils	2–1	Belfast Giants	Belfast Giants	2–1 (OT)	Guildford Flames
2019–20	Season curtailed due to the COVID-19 pandemic, no titles awarded.				Sheffield Steelers	4–3	Cardiff Devils
2020–21	Season cancelled due to the COVID-19 pandemic.						
2021–22	Belfast Giants	Cardiff Devils	6–3	Belfast Giants	Belfast Giants	3–2 (OT)	Cardiff Devils
2022–23	Belfast Giants	Belfast Giants	4–1	Cardiff Devils	Belfast Giants	9–3	Fife Flyers
2023–24	Sheffield Steelers	Sheffield Steelers	3–1	Belfast Giants	Sheffield Steelers	3–1	Guildford Flames
2024–25	Belfast Giants	Nottingham Panthers	4–3 (OT)	Cardiff Devils	Belfast Giants	4–0	Cardiff Devils
2025–26	Belfast Giants	Cardiff Devils	5–2	Sheffield Steelers	Nottingham Panthers	3–2 (OT)	Coventry Blaze

=== Most trophies in EIHL era (2003–present) ===
	Club	Playoffs	League	Challenge Cup	Total
1	Nottingham Panthers	6	1	9	16
1	Belfast Giants	2	8	6	16
3	Sheffield Steelers	6	6	2	14
4	Cardiff Devils	4	2	3	9
5	Coventry Blaze	2	4	2	8
6	Newcastle Vipers	1	0	0	1

== Players ==
Elite League teams rely heavily on players from outside the United Kingdom (termed imports). The majority of these players are from North America, and typically played in the minor North American leagues such as the ECHL and American Hockey League (AHL) before coming to Britain. For example, of the 21 players to play for champions Belfast Giants in the 2005–06 season, 10 were Canadian, 8 were British and 3 were American. The league restricts the number of import players which can be dressed for a game, with a current limit of 14 imports. Player turnover is high, with a large proportion of players spending a single season at a team before moving on, and multi-year contracts are less common.

As would be expected in a league dominated by North American players, the style of ice hockey in Britain is similar to that played in North America, and has a more physical style than that played in other, technically natured European countries. This was demonstrated during the 2004–05 NHL lock-out. Of the NHL players to join Elite League teams, the majority were players noted for physical play rather than puck-handling skills; such as Wade Belak and Eric Cairns.

While British players account for a minority of Elite League players, the league supplies the majority of players for the British national ice hockey team. All 22 players in the Great Britain squad for the 2018 World Championships played for Elite League teams in the preceding season.

== Media coverage ==
=== Television broadcast deals ===
In the 1980s and 1990s, Sky Sports and BBC's Grandstand programme covered the British Hockey League and Superleague and their important games and competitions regularly.

However, in 2001 the Superleague sold its broadcasting rights to Premium TV Ltd who planned to set up a new sports channel, which never materialised. British ice hockey was left without coverage from any television network. This situation continued through the final seasons of the Superleague and into the first seasons of the Elite League.

In 2005, Elite League officials concluded an agreement with the North American Sports Network to provide a weekly highlights and news programme. These usually provide highlights from a game recorded the previous weekend and are an hour in length.

In September 2007, the Elite League announced a deal with Sky Sports for a weekly show of Elite League highlights.

In 2010, Sky Sports showed the playoff final between the Belfast Giants and Cardiff Devils live, the first time Sky had shown a live game for several years. Sky Sports have recently announced plans to show live games along with a weekly highlight show during the 2010–11 season.

In the 2013–14 season, Premier Sports acquired the rights to film and broadcast 23 games from the Elite League with a live game shown every Saturday night from 23 November onwards.

On 6 December 2016, it was announced that a new TV show called Facing Off would be broadcast on a UK free-to-air channel called "Front Runner TV" every Thursday, Friday and Saturday to show the highlights of the week's EIHL games. The deal ran to the end of 2016–17 EIHL season.

Then, on 20 July 2018, the EIHL agreed a two-year deal with FreeSports to broadcast one live EIHL game every two weeks, alongside a pre-season preview show, highlights package, and live coverage of the end of season play-off final. The coverage, which was available via Freeview, Sky, Virgin, FreeSat, TalkTalk, BT Vision and online via the TVPlayer, was fronted by Aaron Murphy who previously commentated on the league for Premier Sports.

In January 2020, the league announced that Premier Sports would show live coverage of the 2020 Challenge Cup final and 2020 Elite League play-off final.

In September 2021, the league confirmed that Premier Sports had become headline sponsors and the EIHL's exclusive television partners for three seasons, beginning from the 2021–22 season. Coverage would again be fronted by Aaron Murphy, with analysis from Paul Adey, and consist of 27 live matches – including 23 league games, the Challenge Cup final and the end of season play-off final weekend. During this time, the league was known as the Premier Sports Elite League. In November 2022, following news Viaplay had acquired Premier Sports, the Elite League's title sponsors changed to the Viaplay Elite League to reflect the rebrand.

The EIHL were without a major television rights holder during the 2023/24 season after ending their relationship with Viaplay. However, after Premier Sports re-acquired the contract from Viaplay in April 2024, they broadcast the end of season play-off final weekend from Nottingham. Aaron Murphy, Paul Adey and Chris Ellis were again the broadcast crew.

=== Other coverage ===
Ice hockey receives little national media coverage in the United Kingdom. Some national newspapers list results and provide short summaries of the league's news but more extensive coverage remains minimal. There was a small surge in interest during the 2004–05 season when newspapers such as The Times reported on the NHL players playing the Elite League as a result of the lock-out but since the lock-out ended, coverage has returned to its previous levels.

Of the national newspapers only the Daily Star has a regular ice hockey column, which appears on Tuesday and Sunday.

Coverage in the towns and cities where Elite League clubs are based is more extensive, and local newspapers have dedicated ice hockey reporters who cover the local team. Local radio stations such as BBC CWR, BBC Radio Nottingham, and BBC Radio Sheffield all provide programming on the sport. Radio Sheffield also provides a weekly ice hockey programme Iceline while Radio Nottingham has broadcast a similar programme, Powerplay, since the later stages of the 2005–06 season, and has a 15-minute weekly preview of games on Saturday evenings during the ice hockey season after the station's coverage of the local football teams is completed. BBC CWR have also followed suit with Faceoff, a programme broadcast on the first Thursday of the month during the season.

The Cardiff Devils are given weekly highlights coverage on local TV station, "Made in Cardiff", which is available on Freeview Ch23, Sky Guide Ch134 and Virgin Ch159.

In Scotland, coverage of the three teams - Glasgow Clan, Fife Flyers and Dundee Stars - is very rare despite recording higher average attendances and more online presence than many teams in the Scottish football league and rugby union, which takes up the majority of any air time or column inches.

All of the teams also provide webcasts on match nights.

== Comparison to other leagues ==
In attendance, the EIHL ranks seventh among the European top leagues with a 2,842 average. Three teams are among the top 100 of the continent: 2016 Challenge Cup champions Nottingham Panthers at 38th (5,720 average), the 2016 league champions Sheffield Steelers at 64th (4,830), and the 2012 league champions Belfast Giants at 70th (4,603)

Previously, the EIHL champions were invited to play in the IIHF Continental Cup, Europe's second-level club competition. For the 2009–10 tournament, the EIHL's entrants began the tournament in the penultimate (third) group stage. However, with the introduction of the Champions Hockey League, this has changed. From the 2015–16 season, the top two teams in the EIHL participate in the CHL, with either the team that wins the post-season playoffs, or the team finishing third if the playoffs winner is one of the top two, entering the Continental Cup.

During the 2012–13 NHL Lockout, several NHL players plied their trade in the Elite League, including; Matt Beleskey, Paul Bissonnette, Drew Miller, Tom Sestito and Anthony Stewart.

The league has had a reputation for attracting ex-NHL players, including Stanley Cup champion Theo Fleury for the Belfast Giants, Dustin Kohn who played for the Sheffield Steelers, Kevin Westgarth who played for the Belfast Giants, Cam Janssen, formerly of the Nottingham Panthers, ex-Braehead Clan captain Matt Keith and Stefan Della Rovere, Ryan O'Marra of the Coventry Blaze, and Brian McGrattan who played for the Nottingham Panthers.

Elsewhere Jared Staal – brother of NHLers Eric, Marc and Jordan – played a season for the Edinburgh Capitals while Patrick Bordeleau played a season with the Cardiff Devils.

Other ex-NHL players to have played in the league include Jason Williams, Chris Stewart, Dylan Olsen and Michael Garnett for Nottingham; Ric Jackman for Braehead and Fife and Jay Rosehill for Braehead and Manchester; Jim Vandermeer, Patrick Dwyer and Griffin Reinhart for Belfast; Pavel Vorobyev for Edinburgh; Tyson Strachan for Cardiff; Tim Wallace for Sheffield and Milton Keynes, and Aaron Johnson for Sheffield.

More recently, Stanley Cup champion Milan Lucic, and fellow forwards David Booth and Brett Ritchie have also played in the EIHL.

Meanwhile, in being drafted by the Arizona Coyotes in 2018, Sheffield Steelers forward Liam Kirk became the first English born and trained player to be drafted by an NHL side. Kirk signed a three-year, entry-level contract with Arizona in June 2021.

== Criticism of the EIHL ==
The main criticism levelled at the EIHL is that the league is too expensive, an accusation given credence by the collapse of the London Racers mid-season in 2005, and the continued financial problems experienced by a number of other member clubs (most notably the Basingstoke Bison and Manchester Phoenix in 2008–09).

Both the Edinburgh Capitals and Newcastle Vipers made public statements about their potentially perilous financial situations, casting further doubt over both their own, and the league's sustained viability.

This perceived problem with expenditure was given further credence when the Hull Stingrays announced, on 11 August 2010, that they were ceasing operations immediately, due to insufficient funds from sponsorships to guarantee completing the season. They were, however, taken over on 17 August 2010 by the Coventry Blaze and therefore the Hull Stingrays continued to operate. However, Hull did fold in 2015.

In 2011, the Newcastle Vipers announced that they would not be able to compete in the 2011–12 season due to financial difficulties and lack of a permanent home stadium. Newcastle had, up to this point, been playing their home games at Whitley Bay ice rink. A proposed new stadium in the Newcastle area did not materialise.

== Expansion ==
Despite there being a limited number of suitable venues for league expansion, there have been various attempts during the EIHL's lifespan to expand the league. After the successful addition of the Braehead Clan and the Dundee Stars for the 2010–11 season, the EIHL reported that it had entered discussions with the Fife Flyers formerly of the defunct BNL, and then resident in the SNL.

On 24 June 2011, it was confirmed that the Fife Flyers had been admitted to the EIHL in time for the commencement of the 2011–12 season.

Further to this, Neil Black, owner of the Nottingham Panthers and Glasgow Clan has expressed the desire to see a Manchester team back in the EIHL by 2015, along with teams in Dublin and London, subject to there being suitable venues available.

In mid-2013, stories began to circulate that the EIHL had approached AEG with the intention of placing a London-based franchise into Wembley Arena. League chairman Tony Smith confirmed that a franchise had been awarded to a London-based group for a franchise located within the capital.

On 29 March 2016, it was announced that the Milton Keynes Lightning (playing in the second-tier English Premier League) would be joining the Elite League for the 2017–18 season. They remained in the league for two seasons.

On 24 February 2017, it was announced that the Guildford Flames would make the step-up to the Elite League for the following season, thus expanding the league to twelve teams.

== Records ==
- Most regular season titles: Belfast Giants (7)
- Most play-off championship titles: Sheffield Steelers/Nottingham Panthers (6)
- Most Challenge Cup titles (EIHL era): Nottingham Panthers (9)
- Most Knockout Cup titles: Belfast Giants, Cardiff Devils, Coventry Blaze, Sheffield Steelers (1)
- Most wins in regular season: Belfast Giants (46) (2011–12, 54-game season)
- Most ties in regular season: London Racers (9) (2004–05, 50-game season)
- Most losses in regular season (inc. Overtime): London Racers (51) (2003–04, 56-game season)
- Most goals scored in regular season: Cardiff Devils (269) (2010–11, 54-game season)
- Most goals allowed in regular season: Edinburgh Capitals (418) (2010–11, 54-game season)
- Most points in regular season: Belfast Giants (95) (2011–12, 54-game season)
- Most shutouts in regular season: Ervins Mustukovs (Sheffield Steelers) 10 (2010–11)
- Highest attendance in the regular season: 9,512 (Sheffield Steelers vs. Nottingham Panthers, 26 December 2025)
- Most goals in a single game (team) (regular season): Sheffield Steelers (18) (Sheffield Steelers 18–1 Edinburgh Capitals, 15 January 2011)
- Largest winning margin (regular season): Sheffield Steelers (17) (Sheffield Steelers 18–1 Edinburgh Capitals, 15 January 2011)

== See also ==
- Man of Ice
- British ice hockey league champions
- List of professional sports teams in the United Kingdom
