= ISL All-Star Team =

The All-Star Teams for the now defunct British Ice Hockey Superleague were voted for by members of The British Ice Hockey Writers Association (now known as Ice Hockey Journalists UK) to honour the best players at the end of each season.

== 1996-1997 ==
NB: Only one All-Star team was elected in the 1996/97 season.

Position	Player	Nationality	Team
Goaltender	Stevie Lyle	(United Kingdom)	Cardiff Devils
Defence	Kip Noble	(Canada)	Cardiff Devils
Defence	Garth Premak	(Canada)	Nottingham Panthers
Forward	Paul Adey	(Canada)	Nottingham Panthers
Forward	Ivan Matulik	(Slovakia)	Cardiff Devils
Forward	Vezio Sacratini	(Canada)	Cardiff Devils

== 1997-1998 ==
First Team

Position	Player	Nationality	Team
Goaltender	Rob Dopson	(Canada)	Ayr Scottish Eagles
Defence	Scott Young	(Canada)	Ayr Scottish Eagles
Defence	Kris Miller	(United States)	Manchester Storm
Forward	Ed Courtenay	(Canada)	Sheffield Steelers
Forward	Mark Montanari	(Canada)	Ayr Scottish Eagles
Forward	Craig Woodcroft	(Canada)	Manchester Storm

Second Team

Position	Player	Nationality	Team
Goaltender	Mark Bernard	(Canada)	Bracknell Bees
Defence	Kip Noble	(Canada)	Cardiff Devils
Defence	Shayne McCosh	(Canada)	Bracknell Bees
Forward	Tony Hand	(United Kingdom)	Sheffield Steelers
Forward	Steve Thornton	(Canada)	Cardiff Devils
Forward	Sam Groleau	(Canada)	Ayr Scottish Eagles

== 1998-1999 ==
First Team

Position	Player	Nationality	Team
Goaltender	Frank Pietrangelo	(Canada)	Manchester Storm
Defence	Kip Noble	(Canada)	Cardiff Devils
Defence	Troy Neumeier	(Canada)	Manchester Storm
Forward	Greg Hadden	(Canada)	Nottingham Panthers
Forward	Ed Courtenay	(Canada)	Sheffield Steelers
Forward	Paul Adey	(Canada)	Nottingham Panthers

Second Team

Position	Player	Nationality	Team
Goaltender	Trevor Robins	(Canada)	Nottingham Panthers
Defence	Kris Miller	(United States)	Manchester Storm
Defence	Rob Stewart	(Canada)	Bracknell Bees
Forward	Ivan Matulik	(Slovakia)	Cardiff Devils
Forward	Jeff Tomlinson	(Canada)	Manchester Storm
Forward	Jeff Jablonski	(United States)	Manchester Storm

== 1999-2000 ==
First Team

Position	Player	Nationality	Team
Goaltender	Geoff Sarjeant	(Canada)	Ayr Scottish Eagles
Defence	Claudio Scremin	(Canada)	London Knights
Defence	Rob Stewart	(Canada)	Bracknell Bees
Forward	Ed Courtenay	(Canada)	Sheffield Steelers
Forward	Kevin Riehl	(Canada)	Bracknell Bees
Forward	Rob Kenny	(United States)	London Knights

Second Team

Position	Player	Nationality	Team
Goaltender	Brian Greer	(Canada)	Bracknell Bees
Defence	Shayne McCosh	(Canada)	Sheffield Steelers
Defence	Neal Martin	(Canada)	London Knights
Forward	Teeder Wynne	(Canada)	Sheffield Steelers
Forward	Mikko Koivunoro	(Finland)	Newcastle Riverkings
Forward	Steve Thornton	(Canada)	Cardiff Devils

== 2000-2001 ==
First Team

Position	Player	Nationality	Team
Goaltender	Trevor Robbins	(Canada)	London Knights
Defence	Shayne McCosh	(Canada)	Sheffield Steelers
Defence	Jim Paek	(Canada)	Nottingham Panthers
Forward	David Longstaff	(United Kingdom)	Sheffield Steelers
Forward	P.C. Drouin	(Canada)	Nottingham Panthers
Forward	Tony Hand	(United Kingdom)	Ayr Scottish Eagles

Second Team

Position	Player	Nationality	Team
Goaltender	Mike Torchia	(Canada)	Sheffield Steelers
Defence	Neal Martin	(Canada)	London Knights
Defence	Adam Smith	(Canada)	Sheffield Steelers
Forward	Greg Bullock	(Canada)	Manchester Storm
Forward	Steve Thornton	(Canada)	Cardiff Devils
Forward	Kory Karlander	(Canada)	Belfast Giants

== 2001-2002 ==
First Team

Position	Player	Nationality	Team
Goaltender	Mike Bales	(Canada)	Belfast Giants
Defence	Johan Silfwerplatz	(Sweden)	Ayr Scottish Eagles
Defence	Rob Stewart	(Canada)	Belfast Giants
Forward	Kevin Riehl	(Canada)	Belfast Giants
Forward	Sean Berens	(United States)	Belfast Giants
Forward	Jason Ruff	(Canada)	Belfast Giants

Second Team

Position	Player	Nationality	Team
Goaltender	Joaquin Gage	(Canada)	Ayr Scottish Eagles
Defence	Alan Schuler	(Canada)	Ayr Scottish Eagles
Defence	Maurizio Mansi	(Canada)	London Knights
Forward	P.C. Drouin	(Canada)	Nottingham Panthers
Forward	Ed Courtenay	(Canada)	Ayr Scottish Eagles
Forward	Scott Allison	(Canada)	Sheffield Steelers

== 2002-2003 ==
First Team

Position	Player	Nationality	Team
Goaltender	Joel Laing	(Canada)	Sheffield Steelers
Defence	Robby Sandrock	(Canada)	Belfast Giants
Defence	Marc Laniel	(Canada)	Sheffield Steelers
Forward	Lee Jinman	(Canada)	Nottingham Panthers
Forward	Dan Ceman	(Canada)	Bracknell Bees
Forward	Paxton Schulte	(Canada)	Belfast Giants

Second Team

Position	Player	Nationality	Team
Goaltender	Ryan Bach	(Canada)	Belfast Giants
Defence	Dion Darling	(Canada)	Sheffield Steelers
Defence	Jim Paek	(Canada)	Nottingham Panthers
Forward	Greg Hadden	(Canada)	Nottingham Panthers
Forward	Rhett Gordon	(Canada)	Sheffield Steelers
Forward	Kevin Riehl	(Canada)	Belfast Giants

== See also ==
- EIHL All-Star Team
