= List of ISL seasons =

This is a list of Ice Hockey Superleague seasons from its inception to its disbandment:

- 1996–97 ISL season
- 1997–98 ISL season
- 1998–99 ISL season
- 1999–00 ISL season
- 2000–01 ISL season
- 2001–02 ISL season
- 2002–03 ISL season
