= Steve Carpenter =

Canadian ice hockey player (born 1971)

- Born: March 30, 1971 (age 55) Prince George, British Columbia, Canada
- Height: 5 ft 11 in (180 cm)
- Weight: 185 lb (84 kg; 13 st 3 lb)
- Position: Defence
- Shot: Left
- Played for: Richmond Renegades; Fresno Falcons; Solihull Blaze; Nottingham Panthers; Sheffield Steelers; Coventry Blaze; Milton Keynes Lightning
- Playing career: 1995–2005

Steve Carpenter (born March 30, 1971, in Prince George, British Columbia) is a Canadian retired professional ice hockey defenceman. Between 1995 and 1997 he played in the ECHL and the West Coast Hockey League before moving to the United Kingdom, where he played until he retired from ice hockey in 2005.

== Playing career ==
Carpenter attended Northern Michigan University between 1990 and 1994. Whilst there he played for the ice hockey team, the Wildcats, and was honoured by both the league and the team. After university, Carpenter joined the Richmond Renegades in the ECHL for the 1995–96 season. The following season he went to the United Kingdom where he joined the Solihull Blaze in the British National League (BNL), before he returned to the United States to finish the season with the Fresno Falcons in the West Coast Hockey League.

For the 1997–98 season Carpenter returned to the United Kingdom to join the Nottingham Panthers in the Ice Hockey Superleague (ISL). He stayed with the Panthers for the next three seasons helping them to win the Benson & Hedges Cup in 1998 and to get to three other major trophy finals. For the 2000–01 season he joined the Panthers rivals, the Sheffield Steelers, who he helped to win the Grand Slam of all four major competitions that season.

He joined the Coventry Blaze in the second tier BNL in 2001–02. In the 2002–03 season he helped them to win the league and the playoffs and was himself named to the BNL All Star First Team. Coventry joined the new first tier Elite Ice Hockey League for 2003–04 season where Carpenter played. He then joined the Milton Keynes Lightning in the second tier English Premier Ice Hockey League for the 2004–05 season and helped them to win the league and playoffs before he retired from playing in May 2005.

== Awards and honours ==
Award	Year
WCHA All-Tournament Team	1993

- Named to the Western Collegiate Hockey Association 2nd All-League Team in 1994.
- Named to the Western Collegiate Hockey Association All-Academic Team in 1993 and 1994.
- Awarded the Northern Michigan University Tom Laidlaw Best defenceman Award in 1992, 1993 and 1994.
- Named to the British National League First All Star Team in 2003.

== Career statistics ==
=== Club ===
			Regular season					Playoffs				
Season	Team	League	GP	G	A	Pts	PIM	GP	G	A	Pts	PIM
1990–91	Northern Michigan University	NCAA	32	0	7	7	24					
1991–92	Northern Michigan University	NCAA	34	2	11	13	78					
1992–93	Northern Michigan University	NCAA	38	2	20	22	123					
1993–94	Northern Michigan University	NCAA	33	11	19	30	123					
1995–96	Richmond Renegades	ECHL	43	9	29	38	100	—	—	—	—	—
1996–97	Solihull Blaze	BNL	45	27	41	68	178					
1996–97	Fresno Falcons	WCHL	6	2	4	6	10	5	1	1	2	30
1997–98	Nottingham Panthers	ISL	27	2	6	8	24	6	2	0	2	2
1998–99	Nottingham Panthers	ISL	28	3	12	15	26	8	0	3	3	42
1999–00	Nottingham Panthers	ISL	30	4	17	21	114	6	0	1	1	44
2000–01	Sheffield Steelers	ISL	37	4	10	14	67	8	1	3	4	22
2001–02	Coventry Blaze	BNL	42	18	34	52	102	10	1	8	9	30
2002–03	Coventry Blaze	BNL	36	14	24	38	106	10	2	7	9	14
2003–04	Coventry Blaze	EIHL	40	9	20	29	84	4	1	0	1	8
2004–05	Milton Keynes Lightning	EPIHL	28	9	23	32	110	5	1	3	4	24
