= Tommy Plommer =

Canadian-British ice hockey player

- Born: August 26, 1968 (age 58) London, Ontario, Canada
- Height: 5 ft 9 in (175 cm)
- Weight: 174 lb (79 kg; 12 st 6 lb)
- Position: Right wing
- Played for: Ayr Raiders; Sheffield Steelers; Hull Thunder
- National team: Great Britain
- Playing career: 1991–2001

Tommy Plommer (born August 26, 1968) is a retired professional ice hockey player who holds dual Canadian and British nationality. He played for the Ayr Raiders in 1991–92, the Sheffield Steelers between 1992 and 2000 and the Hull Thunder in 2000–01. He was also a member of the Great Britain national ice hockey team at the 1994 Pool B World Championships.

== Career statistics ==
			Regular season					Playoffs
Season	Team	League	GP	G	A	Pts	PIM	GP	G	A	Pts	PIM
1986–87	Woodstock Navy-Vets	NDJCHL	27	13	18	31	54	—	—	—	—	—
1986–87	Norwich Merchants	NDJCHL	1	0	0	0	0	—	—	—	—	—
1986–87	London Diamonds	WOHL	3	0	0	0	4	—	—	—	—	—
1988–89	Strathroy Blades	WOHL	32	9	21	30	202	—	—	—	—	—
1991–92	Ayr Raiders	BHL	35	19	13	32	84	—	—	—	—	—
1992–93	Sheffield Steelers	BD1	32	22	29	51	62	6	5	8	13	6
1993–94	Sheffield Steelers	BHL	43	27	39	66	86	8	8	7	15	28
1994–95	Sheffield Steelers	BHL	43	31	38	69	119	7	3	6	9	32
1995–96	Sheffield Steelers	BHL	34	12	24	36	122	1	1	1	2	0
1996–97	Sheffield Steelers	BISL	41	7	25	32	79	8	2	5	7	10
1997–98	Sheffield Steelers	BISL	39	7	6	13	44	9	1	2	3	6
1998–99	Sheffield Steelers	BISL	42	1	8	9	62	6	0	1	1	18
1999–00	Sheffield Steelers	BISL	36	1	5	6	58	7	0	0	0	12
2000–01	Hull Thunder	BNL	25	8	17	25	83	5	4	4	8	6
BISL totals			158	16	44	60	243	30	3	8	11	46
BHL totals			155	89	114	203	411	16	12	14	26	60
