= Mark Thomas (ice hockey) =

- Born: 23 July 1983 (age 41); Stockport, England, UK
- Height: 6 ft 2 in (188 cm)
- Weight: 189 lb (86 kg; 13 st 7 lb)
- Position: Defence
- Shot: Right
- EPL team Former teams: Manchester Phoenix; Sheffield Steelers
- National team: Great Britain
- Playing career: 2002–2016

Mark Thomas (born 23 July 1983) is an English professional retired ice hockey defenceman who played for the Sheffield Steelers.

== Career ==
Thomas began his professional career in 2002, playing for the Haringey Racers in the ENIL. Thomas took up ice hockey much later than most players but was able to thrive due to his natural talent and physical abilities. Thomas began playing junior ice hockey after watching his local team, the now defunct Manchester Storm, then playing in the ISL.

During his first season, Thomas played in 22 games and totaled 63 penalty minutes, as well as helping out the offence with seven points. For the start of the 2003–04 season, Thomas was a Telford Wildfoxes player but played just once before being traded by the Manchester Phoenix head coach, Rick Brebant, to play for the Phoenix in their debut season.

Thomas played in 52 EIHL regular season games and featured six times in the play-offs. The Phoenix organisation was suspended in 2004 due to off-ice problems. In the summer of 2004, Thomas signed with the London Racers, where he stayed for a season and a half. The Racers franchise folded mid-way through the 2005–06 season.

This mid-season move brought Thomas to sign for the Sheffield Steelers, arch-rivals of the Phoenix, whom Thomas had played for just two years earlier. Thomas established himself as a key part of the Steelers' defence and was a rare British star player surrounded by imports. It was that consistency that saw "Tomo" remain a fan favourite with the Steelers organisation for 10 seasons, and in 2015, he was rewarded with a testimonial season.

Various events were held in his testimonial year, including a testimonial match which saw many former Steelers, including Scott Basiuk and Steve Munn, return to Sheffield.

On 6 May 2015, it was announced that Thomas was returning to his hometown team, the EPL's Manchester Phoenix, whom he had previously played for in their inaugural season in 2003–04.
