= Adam Smith (ice hockey) =

Canadian ice hockey player

- Born: May 24, 1976 (age 50) Digby, Nova Scotia, Canada
- Height: 6 ft 0 in (183 cm)
- Weight: 215 lb (98 kg; 15 st 5 lb)
- Position: Defence
- Shot: Left
- Played for: Binghamton Rangers; Hartford Wolf Pack; Grand Rapids Griffins; Fort Wayne Komets; Bracknell Bees; Sheffield Steelers; EC Bad Nauheim; Trenton Titans; Macon Whoopee; Invicta Dynamos; SC Riessersee
- NHL draft: 78th, 1994; New York Rangers
- Playing career: 1996–2003

Adam Smith (born May 24, 1976 in Digby, Nova Scotia) is a Canadian retired professional ice hockey defenceman. He was selected in the third round, 78th overall, by the New York Rangers in the 1994 NHL entry draft.

== Playing career ==
Between 1996 and 1999 he played in the American Hockey League and the International Hockey League for the Binghamton Rangers, Hartford Wolfpack, Grand Rapids Griffins and Fort Wayne Komets. He following that with three seasons in Europe playing for the Bracknell Bees and Sheffield Steelers of the Ice Hockey Superleague in the United Kingdom and for EC Bad Nauheim in the 2nd Bundesliga in Germany.

Smith returned to North America to finish the 2001–02 season playing for Trenton Titans and Macon Whoopee in the ECHL. He then returned to Europe for the 2002–03 season where he played four games for the Invicta Dynamos in the English Premier Ice Hockey League before moving back to the 2nd Bundesliga and playing for SC Riessersee.

While in the UK, Smith helped the Bracknell Bees to win the league championship in 1990–00 and the Sheffield Steelers to win a Grand Slam of the Challenge Cup, Benson & Hedges Cup, league championship and playoffs in the 2000–01 season.

== Awards and honours ==
- Named to the ISL All-Star Second Team in 2000–01.

== Career statistics ==
			Regular season					Playoffs				
Season	Team	League	GP	G	A	Pts	PIM	GP	G	A	Pts	PIM
1992–93	Tacoma Rockets	WHL	67	0	12	12	43	7	0	1	1	4
1993–94	Tacoma Rockets	WHL	66	4	19	23	119	8	0	0	0	10
1994–95	Tacoma Rockets	WHL	69	2	19	21	96	4	0	1	1	9
1995–96	Kelowna Rockets	WHL	67	8	15	23	125	6	1	1	2	8
1996–97	Binghamton Rangers	AHL	56	0	8	8	59	2	0	0	0	0
1997–98	Hartford Wolf Pack	AHL	64	7	5	12	120	4	0	0	0	12
1998–99	Grand Rapids Griffins	IHL	5	0	0	0	12	—	—	—	—	—
1998–99	Fort Wayne Komets	IHL	27	3	1	4	44	2	1	0	1	0
1998–99	Hartford Wolf Pack	AHL	29	1	4	5	54	—	—	—	—	—
1999–00	Bracknell Bees	ISL	32	2	11	13	44	4	1	4	5	2
2000–01	Sheffield Steelers	ISL	46	5	8	13	82	8	0	1	1	6
2001–02	EC Bad Nauheim	2.GBun	28	2	8	10	129	10	3	4	7	18
2001–02	Trenton Titans	ECHL	3	0	0	0	4	—	—	—	—	—
2001–02	Macon Whoopee	ECHL	3	0	0	0	0	—	—	—	—	—
2002–03	Invicta Dynamos	EPIHL	4	1	3	4	2	—	—	—	—	—
2002–03	SC Riessersee	2.GBun	51	9	12	21	198	10	1	9	10	22
