= Tony Hand =

Scottish ice hockey player and coach (born 1967)

Tony Hand MBE
- Born: 15 August 1967 (age 59) Edinburgh, Scotland
- Height: 5 ft 10 in (178 cm)
- Weight: 185 lb (84 kg; 13 st 3 lb)
- Position: Forward
- Shot: Right
- EPL team Former teams: Manchester Phoenix; Murrayfield Racers; Edinburgh Racers; Sheffield Steelers; Ayr Scottish Eagles; Dundee Stars; Edinburgh Capitals; Belfast Giants
- National team: Great Britain
- NHL draft: 252nd overall, 1986; Edmonton Oilers
- Playing career: 1983–2015

Anthony Hand MBE (born 15 August 1967) is a Scottish former ice hockey player and coach. He was the first British player to be drafted by an NHL team when he was picked by the Edmonton Oilers in 1986.

Nicknamed Two point Tony, he holds several national records, and scored over 4000 points in his career, more than any professional hockey player at any level. Still over a point-per-game scorer deep into his forties, Hand retired after the 2015 EPIHL league finals, after his Manchester Phoenix team lost.

Hand served as the head coach of the Great Britain national team, a position he assumed in 2011 and resigned from in 2013. Until the franchise folded in January 2017, he was the coach of the Manchester Phoenix. In 2017, Hand received the Torriani Award from the International Ice Hockey Federation (IIHF) in 2017, and inducted into the IIHF Hall of Fame.

== Early life ==
Hand was born on 15 August 1967 in Edinburgh, the second son to David and Lorraine Hand. He grew up in the Muirhouse area of the city and attended St Augustine's Catholic School. He started his ice hockey career with the Edinburgh-based Murrayfield Racers, playing for their junior team the Raiders and working part-time at the rink. His older brother Paul was also an ice hockey player.

== Professional career ==
=== Early playing career ===
He made his senior debut on 20 September 1981, at the age of fourteen against the Fife Flyers when the Murrayfield Racers had a player shortage. He gained his first point against the Billingham Bombers on 17 October 1981, with an assist to a Chris Kelland goal. He finished the 1981/82 season having played 19 games, scoring 4 goals and adding 7 assists for 11 points. He followed it up the following year with 20 goals and 22 assists, a total of 42 points, in 24 games.

He established himself as a regular first choice player for Murrayfield side that finished 5th in the 1983/84 season, scoring 52 goals and 43 assists in 30 league games after scoring 12 goals and 8 assists in 7 Autumn Cup games. He reached his first Championship Playoff Final with Murrayfield but despite Hand scoring 10 goals and 5 assists in 6 games, the Racers lost 5–4 to Dundee Rockets. He went on to represent Great Britain at the World Junior Championships, scoring 6 goals and 3 assists.

In the 1984/85, Hand clocked up his 100th career league goal against Durham Wasps, scoring 72 in the season and broke Roy Halpin's league assists record with 107. He also scored 44 goals and 50 assists in 14 Autumn Cup and Championship Playoff games. With Murrayfield, he reached his second successive final after the Racers finished 3rd in the league but again they lost, this time to Fife Flyers. Representing Great Britain at the Pool C European Championships in Feltre in Italy, he played 3 games and scored 4 points. He also scored 2 goals while guesting for Dundee in the European Cup.

In the 1985/86 season, Hand continued to clock up the points scoring 72 goals and 110 assists from 35 games to help Murrayfield finish 2nd in the League behind Durham, including his 200th goal against Peterborough Pirates on 8 February 1986. In 15 cup and playoff games, he also scored 35 goals and 36 assists as Murrayfield won both competitions. They beat Durham 8–5 in the Autumn Cup and Dundee 4–2 at Wembley. Personally, he was awarded the Young Player of the Year award-winning a couple of weeks attendance at the Calgary Flames training camp to train with NHL players.

=== NHL draft pick ===
Instead of attending the Flames training camp, Hand went to the Edmonton Oilers' training camp after they had selected him in the 12th round (252nd and last overall) of the 1986 NHL entry draft. There he survived the full fourteen days of camp without being cut, despite breaking his only stick on the first day and having to borrow one from Marty McSorley. Playing alongside players such as Wayne Gretzky and Mark Messier, he impressed coach Glen Sather and was offered a contract to play junior hockey for a year. Suffering from homesickness, Hand turned it down but agreed to return the following year. Hand was the first of only three British-born and trained players ever to have been drafted by an NHL team (the second being Colin Shields and the third being Liam Kirk).

Before returning home to Scotland, Hand played briefly for the junior Western Hockey League's Victoria Cougars, with whom he had trained before the Edmonton camp, and scored eight points in only three games. He returned to Scotland a few months later due to exhaustion from the demands of training, playing and press interest.

Despite the interest of other British clubs, Hand returned to play for the Racers, where he won his first Heineken League Premier title, the Regal Scottish Cup and Scottish League. He broke the 200-league-point barrier for the first time, scoring 105 goals and 111 assists in 35 games, and scored his 300th career goal against Nottingham Panthers in February 1987. However, the Racers lost in the play-offs to Durham Wasps. He also won a bronze medal with the Great Britain Under-21s in Pool C of the World Championships in Denmark.

The following season, Hand went back to Canada to train with the Cougars before heading to Edmonton where he played for the Oilers against Team Canada and assisted a Kevin Lowe goal. Again he was offered a contract with the Oilers' farm team, the Nova Scotia Oilers, but again turned it down, afraid of being stuck in minor professional hockey earning less than his contract in Edinburgh.

In his autobiography, Hand wrote that this was perhaps a mistake and that perhaps he should have re-negotiated the offer. In the foreword, Sather expressed his disappointment that "he didn't accept my deal because he could have advanced in North America. His progress would have been celebrated." Indeed, Sather also says "At the training camp I could see that he had a great ability to read the ice and he was the smartest player there other than Wayne Gretzky. He skated well: his intelligence on the ice stood out. He was a real prospect."

=== Return to Britain ===
Hand returned in October 1987 for Murrayfield's first ill-fated trip onto the continent to play in the IIHF's European Cup where, after beating Bulgarian side Slavia Sofia in a preliminary round, the semi-pro team from Scotland were thrashed by full-time sides from the Netherlands, Sweden and (Germany).

On the domestic front they again won the Heineken League as well as the Scottish League and Cup double. However, in the Norwich Union Cup & Championship play-offs, Durham Wasps again proved to be their nemesis. After beating Murrayfield 11–5 in the final of the Autumn Cup competition, Durham also knocked them out of the Wembley Semi-final 11–8 despite Hand scoring a Championship record 7 points in the match. Hand ended the 1987–88 season with 125 goals and 135 assists in 52 league and cup games having scored his 400th league goal against Whitley Warriors on 13 March.

During the close season, Hand trained with Geneve-Servette and was offered a contract as their fourth import, but in the top Swiss league which allowed only three imports to play in game, he turned it down. Instead he returned to Murrayfield where, in an indifferent year, he scored 114 goals and 162 assists in 49 games, including his 1,000th point and 500th goal.

Having won the Scottish league and cup double with Murrayfield, Hand was selected for the GB senior team for the first time, making his debut in the World Championships Pool D competition in Belgium. In 4 games, he scored 6 goals and 12 assists to help Britain to a third-place finish and receiving his first World Championship medal.

At the end of the 1989–90 season, after winning the Norwich Union Cup and the Scottish double, Murrayfield reached the Wembley play-off for the fifth time in seven years but lost to Cardiff Devils on penalty shots with Hand missing the deciding shot. He played 45 games, scoring 73 goals and 117 assists. In March 1990, he won a Gold medal and the MVP award during Great Britain's Pool D promotion campaign in Cardiff scoring 5 goals and 8 assists in 4 one-sided games against Australia and Spain.

The following season was a disappointing one for Hand as Murrayfield won only one trophy, the Capital Foods Scottish Cup and Great Britain could only finish fifth in the Pool C competition in Denmark. On a personal front, Hand scored his 600th league goal against Durham Wasps and a record 11 assists against Trafford Metros in the quarter-final stage of the Norwich Union Cup. Overall, he scored 85 goals and 147 assists for Murrayfield in 52 games plus 9 goals and 12 assists in 8 games for the GB side.

1991–92 started badly for Hand with an eight-game ban for a drug offence when a cold remedy gave a positive result for traces of ephedrine. However, the domestic season got better for him personally as he was awarded a place on the All-Star team and was voted Players' Player of the Year. He was also the League's top scorer with 60 goals and 80 assists in 36 games and captained the Scotland side that beat England 7–6 in the 49th Home International, scoring three of the goals. For the Murrayfield team though, the season was full of controversy and disappointment which ended without qualifying for the play-offs.

In March 1992, the Pool C competition was held in Hull and in a group containing Australia, Belgium, Hungary, North Korea and South Korea, the GB team won the gold medal and promotion to Pool B. Hand finished top scorer with 6 goals and 12 assists in the 5 games to win the Best Forward award.

=== End of an era ===
Despite good offers from many teams over the years, Hand had remained with the Murrayfield Racers until they folded in 1994. Even then he joined the newly formed Edinburgh Racers, scoring over 200 points in a season for the third time in his career. However, after a single season with the Edinburgh Racers who also went bankrupt, Hand finally moved to the Sheffield Steelers, in the Superleague. Four years later, another return to Scotland came with a move to the Ayr Scottish Eagles. It was also around this time that Hand was offered a place on the roster of HPK of Finland's SM-Liiga

=== Coaching career ===
In 2001, Hand started a coaching career as player-coach of the newly formed Dundee Stars of the British National League, before returning to Edinburgh to coach the Edinburgh Capitals, where he has coached twice (2003–2004 and 2005–2006). Between these two spells at Edinburgh Hand was player-coach of the Belfast Giants. In the 2004 New Year Honours, Hand was appointed a Member of the Order of the British Empire (MBE) for services to ice hockey.

On 19 April 2006, Hand was announced as the head coach of the Manchester Phoenix for the 2006–07 season. Hand has now released his autobiography, Tony Hand: A Life in British Ice Hockey, written with Mike Appleton. Still playing aged 41, in November 2008 he scored his 4000th career point against Hull Stingrays.

Hand was named the head coach of the British national team on 30 December 2011. He signed a contract for four years.

As of 2018, Hand is the director of hockey for the Murrayfield Racers. On the 24 April 2023, Hand was announced as the head coach of Whitley Warriors.

== Honours and awards ==
- Scottish National League 1985–86 (Murrayfield Racers)
- British National League 1986–87, 1987–88 (Murrayfield Racers), 2001–02 (Dundee Stars)
- Best Forward (World Championships D) 1990
- Best Forward (World Championships C) 1992
- ISL Second Team All-Star 1997–98
- Awarded the Ice Hockey Annual Trophy as leading British scorer in 1998–99, 1999–00, 2000–01, 2004–05, 2005–06, 2006–07
- Sekonda Face to Watch December 1999 and November 2000
- ISL First Team All-Star 2000–01
- British National league Coach of the Year 2001–02
- British National League top points scorer 2001–02, 2002–03, 2003–04
- British Ice Hockey Writers' Association Player of the Year 1988–89, 2003–04, 2004–05, 2010–11
- Best British Forward 2004–05, 2005–06, 2006–07, 2007–08
- EIHL First Team All-Star 2004–05
- EIHL Second Team All-Star 2005–06
- British Ice Hockey Writers' Association All Star Teams 2008–09, 2009–10, 2010–11
- British Ice Hockey Writers' Association Coach of the Year 2010–11
- British Ice Hockey Hall of Fame, 2016
- Received the Torriani Award in 2017, and inducted into the IIHF Hall of Fame

== Career statistics ==
=== Regular season and playoffs ===
			Regular season					Playoffs
Season	Team	League	GP	G	A	Pts	PIM	GP	G	A	Pts	PIM
1982–83	Murrayfield Racers	BHL	22	18	21	39	23	2	2	1	3	0
1983–84	Murrayfield Racers	BHL	30	52	43	95	28	6	10	5	15	6
1984–85	Murrayfield Racers	BHL	36	72	92	164	36	6	13	11	24	4
1985–86	Murrayfield Racers	BHL	32	79	85	164	49	6	13	13	26	4
1986–87	Victoria Cougars	WHL	3	4	4	8	0	—	—	—	—	—
1986–87	Murrayfield Racers	BHL	35	105	111	216	86	6	9	19	28	4
1987–88	Murrayfield Racers	BHL	36	81	111	192	54	5	17	6	23	16
1988–89	Murrayfield Racers	BHL	35	86	126	212	57	4	8	10	18	12
1989–90	Murrayfield Racers	BHL	32	53	91	144	26	6	9	10	19	10
1990–91	Murrayfield Racers	BHL	34	60	96	156	46	7	8	17	25	8
1991–92	Murrayfield Racers	BHL	36	60	80	140	46	5	8	12	20	2
1992–93	Murrayfield Racers	BHL	35	66	119	185	100	7	14	19	33	8
1993–94	Murrayfield Racers	BHL	44	73	149	222	44	6	9	15	24	10
1994–95	Edinburgh Racers	BHL	42	71	136	207	28	8	13	21	34	20
1995–96	Sheffield Steelers	BHL	35	46	77	123	65	8	6	10	16	4
1996–97	Sheffield Steelers	ISL	41	13	32	45	26	8	3	6	9	4
1997–98	Sheffield Steelers	ISL	28	9	30	39	16	9	2	9	11	4
1998–99	Sheffield Steelers	ISL	36	11	27	38	6	5	1	4	5	0
1999–2000	Ayr Scottish Eagles	ISL	40	8	35	43	52	7	0	4	4	0
2000–01	Ayr Scottish Eagles	ISL	46	19	36	55	42	7	2	5	7	0
2001–02	Dundee Stars	GBR II	44	25	79	104	18	10	7	17	24	4
2002–03	Dundee Stars	GBR II	35	22	56	78	99	—	—	—	—	—
2003–04	Edinburgh Capitals	GBR II	36	21	63	84	38	11	2	14	16	2
2004–05	Belfast Giants	EIHL	30	10	27	37	48	8	0	6	6	34
2005–06	Edinburgh Capitals	EIHL	45	15	38	53	4	4	2	2	4	0
2006–07	Manchester Phoenix	EIHL	51	17	55	72	60	2	0	0	0	20
2007–08	Manchester Phoenix	EIHL	61	24	63	87	60	2	0	0	0	0
2008–09	Manchester Phoenix	EIHL	52	17	50	67	74	—	—	—	—	—
2009–10	Manchester Phoenix	EPL	54	25	95	120	52	3	1	3	4	4
2010–11	Manchester Phoenix	EPL	54	25	108	133	65	3	2	3	5	0
2011–12	Manchester Phoenix	EPL	21	6	26	32	12	3	0	3	3	4
2012–13	Manchester Phoenix	EPL	47	10	67	77	52	4	3	6	9	8
2013–14	Manchester Phoenix	EPL	53	18	64	82	104	4	1	7	8	2
2014–15	Manchester Phoenix	EPL	44	11	46	57	36	4	0	4	4	0
BHL totals			484	921	1338	2259	688	82	139	169	308	108
ISL totals			207	65	174	239	144	36	8	28	36	8
EPL totals			273	95	406	501	321	21	7	26	33	18

=== International ===
Year	Team	Event	GP	G	A	Pts	PIM
1982	Great Britain	EJC C	4	6	4	10	0
1983	Great Britain	EJC C	3	3	2	5	2
1984	Great Britain	EJC C	6	9	7	16	4
1984	Great Britain	WJC C	4	6	3	9	16
1985	Great Britain	EJC C	3	4	0	4	0
1986	Great Britain	WJC C	5	10	1	11	6
1987	Great Britain	WJC C	5	8	5	13	16
1989	Great Britain	WC D	4	6	12	18	2
1991	Great Britain	WC C	8	9	12	21	12
1992	Great Britain	WC C	5	6	12	18	4
1993	Great Britain	WC B	7	6	8	14	2
1994	Great Britain	WC	6	0	0	0	0
1998	Great Britain	WC Q	4	1	0	1	6
1999	Great Britain	WC Q	3	1	0	1	4
2000	Great Britain	WC B	7	2	8	10	2
2001	Great Britain	WC D1	5	3	13	16	0
2002	Great Britain	WC D1	5	2	4	6	2
2007	Great Britain	WC D1	5	0	3	3	0
Senior Tier I totals			6	0	0	0	0
Senior Tier II totals			36	15	36	51	16
Senior Tier III totals			13	15	24	39	16

Preceded by Paul Heavey	Manchester Phoenix Head Coach; 2006–2017	Succeeded by Team folded
