= Ed Courtenay =

Canadian ice hockey player and coach

- Born: February 2, 1968 (age 58) Verdun, Quebec, Canada
- Height: 6 ft 4 in (193 cm)
- Weight: 200 lb (91 kg; 14 st 4 lb)
- Position: Right wing
- Shot: Right
- Played for: Kalamazoo Wings; Kansas City Blades; San Jose Sharks; Chicago Wolves; Peoria Rivermen; Reno Renegades; Jacksonville Lizard Kings; San Francisco Spiders; South Carolina Stingrays; Sheffield Steelers; Ayr Scottish Eagles; Verdun Dragons; Belfast Giants; Newcastle Vipers; Manchester Phoenix
- NHL draft: Undrafted
- Playing career: 1988–2009

Edward Emmett Courtenay (born February 2, 1968) is a Canadian former professional ice hockey right winger and head coach.

== Professional career ==
As a youth, Courtenay played in the 1980 and 1981 Quebec International Pee-Wee Hockey Tournaments with a minor ice hockey team from Verdun.

Following Courtenay's junior hockey career with Laval Titan and Granby Bisons in the Quebec Major Junior Hockey League (QMJHL) he was signed by the Minnesota North Stars as a free agent on 1 October 1989. Minnesota assigned Courtenay to play with Kalamazoo Wings in the International Hockey League (IHL) where he spent his first three professional seasons.

Courtenay was selected by the San Jose Sharks in the 1991 Dispersal Draft when the NHL expanded to include San Jose. During the 1991–92 and 1992–93 seasons Courtenay played 44 NHL games for San Jose.

Courtenay spent the next four seasons playing for the Kansas City Blades, the Chicago Wolves, the Peoria Rivermen and the San Francisco Spiders in the IHL; the Reno Renegades in the West Coast Hockey League (WCHL); and the Jacksonville Lizard Kings and the South Carolina Stingrays in the East Coast Hockey League (ECHL) before joining the Sheffield Steelers in the United Kingdom to play in the Ice Hockey Superleague (ISL) in 1997. Courtenay played for Sheffield for three seasons before signing for the Ayr Scottish Eagles for the 2000–01 and 2001–02 seasons, also in the ISL.

Courtenay returned to North America when he was signed as a free agent by the Verdun Dragons of the Quebec Semi-Pro Hockey League (QSPHL) on 12 July 2002 for the 2002–03 season. Courtenay returned to the South Carolina Stingrays for the 2003–04 and 2004–05 seasons before he returned to Europe as a player/coach with the Belfast Giants in 2005. He guided the team to Elite Ice Hockey League (EIHL) league success in 2006. Courtenay's tenure as head coach ended after the 2007/08 season and he was succeeded by Steve Thornton.

== Coaching career ==
Courtenay played for the EIHL club Newcastle Vipers, after being persuaded to come out of retirement by head coach Rob Wilson, and joined on 6 August 2009 to the Manchester Phoenix as an assistant coach.

== Retirement from ice hockey ==
As of March 2010 after returning home to South Carolina for a family visit, Courtenay applied for a job outside of ice hockey with soft drinks giant Pepsi in the Carolinas area. His application was successful, meaning he would not be returning to the Phoenix; he is now considered retired.

On July 21, 2011, it was revealed Courtenay is being considered for the coaching vacancy for the South Carolina Stingrays, along with Stingrays assistant Spencer Carbery and Colgate University assistant coach Brad Dexter.

== Awards ==
- ECHL Most Valuable Player 1996–97.
- Named to the ISL All Star first team in 1998, 1999 and 2000.
- Sekonda Face to Watch for October 1999.
- Sekonda Superleague Player of the Year 1999–00.
- British Ice Hockey Writers' Association Player of the Year Trophy 1999–00.
- Named to the ISL All Star second team in 2002.
- Named to the EIHL All Star first team in 2006.

== Records ==
- ECHL leading point scorer for 1996–97. (shared with Mike Ross)
- ECHL most power play goals for 1996–97.
- ISL most goals for 1997–98.
- ISL most power play goals for 1997–98.
- ISL leading point scorer for 1999–00.

== Career statistics ==
=== Regular season and playoffs ===
			Regular season					Playoffs
Season	Team	League	GP	G	A	Pts	PIM	GP	G	A	Pts	PIM
1985–86	Laval Titan	QMJHL	2	0	0	0	0	8	2	4	6	2
1986–87	Laval Titan	QMJHL	48	15	20	35	12	1	0	0	0	0
1987–88	Granby Bisons	QMJHL	54	37	34	71	19	5	1	1	2	2
1988–89	Granby Bisons	QMJHL	68	59	55	114	68	4	1	1	2	22
1988–89	Kalamazoo Wings	IHL	2	0	0	0	0	1	0	0	0	0
1989–90	Kalamazoo Wings	IHL	56	25	28	53	16	3	0	0	0	0
1990–91	Kalamazoo Wings	IHL	76	35	36	71	37	8	2	3	5	12
1991–92	Kansas City Blades	IHL	36	14	12	26	46	15	8	9	17	15
1991–92	San Jose Sharks	NHL	5	0	0	0	0	—	—	—	—	—
1992–93	Kansas City Blades	IHL	32	15	11	26	25	—	—	—	—	—
1992–93	San Jose Sharks	NHL	39	7	13	20	10	—	—	—	—	—
1993–94	Kansas City Blades	IHL	62	27	21	48	60	—	—	—	—	—
1994–95	Chicago Wolves	IHL	47	14	16	30	20	—	—	—	—	—
1994–95	Peoria Rivermen	IHL	9	5	0	5	4	9	5	3	8	2
1995–96	Reno Renegades	WCHL	7	3	7	10	8	—	—	—	—	—
1995–96	Jacksonville Lizard Kings	ECHL	3	0	2	2	4	18	5	12	17	23
1995–96	San Francisco Spiders	IHL	20	6	3	9	8	—	—	—	—	—
1996–97	South Carolina Stingrays	ECHL	68	54	56	110	70	—	—	—	—	—
1997–98	Sheffield Steelers	ISL	40	27	21	48	16	8	4	4	8	14
1998–99	Sheffield Steelers	ISL	42	26	26	52	12	6	5	3	8	0
1999–00	Sheffield Steelers	ISL	42	32	38	70	38	7	4	1	5	2
2000–01	Ayr Scottish Eagles	ISL	44	20	18	38	22	6	4	2	6	0
2001–02	Ayr Scottish Eagles	ISL	47	21	30	51	16	7	2	6	8	4
2002–03	Verdun Dragons	QSPHL	31	16	19	35	6	9	2	7	9	12
2003–04	South Carolina Stingrays	ECHL	69	29	37	66	16	7	2	5	7	4
2004–05	South Carolina Stingrays	ECHL	62	24	35	59	20	4	2	1	3	4
2005–06	Belfast Giants	EIHL	42	26	41	67	119	7	2	2	4	6
2006–07	Belfast Giants	EIHL	16	6	18	24	8	3	0	3	3	0
2007–08	Belfast Giants	EIHL	57	24	65	89	29	2	0	1	1	0
2008–09	Newcastle Vipers	EIHL	32	18	28	46	16	2	1	1	2	0
2009–10	Manchester Phoenix	EPIHL	41	44	51	95	88	—	—	—	—	—
IHL totals			340	141	127	268	216	36	15	15	30	29
NHL totals			44	7	13	20	10	—	—	—	—	—
