= Brian Greer (ice hockey) =

Canadian ice hockey player

- Born: July 15, 1974 (age 52) Orillia, Ontario, Canada
- Height: 5 ft 10 in (178 cm)
- Weight: 172 lb (78 kg; 12 st 4 lb)
- Position: Goaltender
- Catches: Right
- Played for: Muskegon Fury; Bracknell Bees; SønderjyskE Ishockey; AaB Ishockey; Odense Bulldogs
- Playing career: 1995–present

Brian Greer (born July 15, 1974, in Orillia, Ontario) is a Canadian professional ice hockey goaltender who last played for the Odense Bulldogs in the top Danish ice hockey league, AL-Bank Ligaen.

== Professional career ==
Following Greer's junior hockey with the Gloucester Rangers in the CJHL, he played two years with the Muskegon Fury of the Colonial Hockey League. Greer spent the next 6 seasons playing for the Bracknell Bees of the Ice Hockey Superleague (ISL) in the United Kingdom. The Bees were league champions in the 1999–2000 season.

Greer signed with SønderjyskE of the Danish AL-Bank Ligaen for the 2003–04 season and has played in Denmark since then. He has played for two championship teams in Denmark, in 2005–06 and in 2008–09; both SønderjyskE teams. Greer has also played for Aalborg in the Danish ice hockey league.

== Awards ==
- Named to the All-Star Team in the 1995 Centennial Cup
- Shared the Bracknell Bees Players Player of the Year award with Joe Ferraccioli 1996–1997
- Best Defenceman with the Bracknell Bees 1999–2000
- Named to the 2nd ISL All-Star Team 1999–2000
- Best Defenceman with the Bracknell Bees 2000–2001
- Players Player of the Year with the Bracknell Bees 2000–2001
- Voted Import Player of the Year with the Vojens Lions (SønderjyskE) 2003–2004
- Named to the Danish All-Star Team for the Season 2003–2004
- Voted Best Goaltender in Denmark 2003–2004
- Named to the Danish All-Star Team for the Season 2005–2006

== Records ==
- On Jan 6, 2004 playing for SønderjyskE, Greer became the first professional ice hockey goaltender in Denmark to score a goal.
