= Scott Allison =

Canadian ice hockey player (born 1972)

- Born: 22 April 1972 (age 54) Winnipeg, Manitoba, Canada
- Height: 6 ft 4 in (193 cm)
- Weight: 210 lb (95 kg; 15 st 0 lb)
- Position: Centre
- Shot: Left
- Played for: Cape Breton Oilers; Prince Edward Island Senators; Manitoba Moose; Grand Rapids Griffins; Sheffield Steelers; Augsburger Panther; Nottingham Panthers
- NHL draft: 17th overall, 1990; Edmonton Oilers
- Playing career: 1992–2005

Scott Allison (born 22 April 1972 in Winnipeg, Manitoba) is a Canadian retired professional ice hockey player. He was the first pick for the Edmonton Oilers in the 1990 NHL entry draft (17th overall), but never made the NHL.

== Awards ==
- Sekonda Face to Watch December 2001.
- Named to the BISL Second All-Star team in 2002.

== Career statistics ==
| | | | Regular season | | | | | Playoffs |
| Season | Team | League | GP | G | A | Pts | PIM | GP | G | A | Pts | PIM |
|---|---|---|---|---|---|---|---|---|---|---|---|---|
| 1988–89 | Prince Albert Raiders | WHL | 51 | 6 | 9 | 15 | 37 | 3 | 0 | 0 | 0 | 0 |
| 1989–90 | Prince Albert Raiders | WHL | 66 | 22 | 16 | 38 | 73 | 11 | 1 | 4 | 5 | 8 |
| 1990–91 | Prince Albert Raiders | WHL | 30 | 5 | 5 | 10 | 57 | — | — | — | — | — |
| 1990–91 | Portland Winter Hawks | WHL | 44 | 5 | 17 | 22 | 105 | — | — | — | — | — |
| 1991–92 | Moose Jaw Warriors | WHL | 72 | 37 | 45 | 82 | 238 | 3 | 1 | 1 | 2 | 25 |
| 1992–93 | Cape Breton Oilers | AHL | 49 | 3 | 5 | 8 | 34 | — | — | — | — | — |
| 1992–93 | Wheeling Thunderbirds | ECHL | 6 | 3 | 3 | 6 | 8 | — | — | — | — | — |
| 1993–94 | Cape Breton Oilers | AHL | 75 | 19 | 14 | 33 | 202 | 3 | 0 | 1 | 1 | 2 |
| 1994–95 | Cape Breton Oilers | AHL | 58 | 6 | 14 | 20 | 104 | — | — | — | — | — |
| 1995–96 | PEI Senators | AHL | 63 | 11 | 16 | 27 | 133 | 4 | 1 | 0 | 1 | 15 |
| 1996–97 | Pensacola Ice Pilots | ECHL | 12 | 4 | 5 | 9 | 104 | — | — | — | — | — |
| 1996–97 | Manitoba Moose | IHL | 42 | 4 | 12 | 16 | 140 | — | — | — | — | — |
| 1996–97 | Grand Rapids Griffins | IHL | 12 | 2 | 1 | 3 | 41 | 4 | 0 | 0 | 0 | 21 |
| 1997–98 | Sheffield Steelers | BISL | 25 | 5 | 12 | 17 | 110 | 8 | 6 | 6 | 12 | 53 |
| 1998–99 | Sheffield Steelers | BISL | 36 | 13 | 17 | 30 | 85 | 6 | 3 | 1 | 4 | 12 |
| 1999–2000 | Sheffield Steelers | BISL | 21 | 4 | 6 | 10 | 18 | 7 | 1 | 3 | 4 | 8 |
| 1999–2000 | Augsburger Panther | DEL | 28 | 1 | 4 | 5 | 22 | — | — | — | — | — |
| 2000–01 | Sheffield Steelers | BISL | 39 | 12 | 11 | 23 | 197 | 3 | 1 | 1 | 2 | 10 |
| 2001–02 | Sheffield Steelers | BISL | 46 | 22 | 23 | 45 | 50 | 8 | 3 | 3 | 6 | 8 |
| 2002–03 | Nottingham Panthers | BISL | 31 | 5 | 11 | 16 | 68 | 16 | 4 | 8 | 12 | 64 |
| 2003–04 | Bracknell Bees | GBR.2 | 35 | 20 | 27 | 47 | 114 | 13 | 3 | 11 | 14 | 79 |
| 2004–05 | Wichita Thunder | CHL | 52 | 17 | 17 | 34 | 171 | 12 | 5 | 1 | 6 | 16 |
| 2005–06 | Dartmouth Destroyers | CEHL | 35 | 16 | 23 | 39 | 101 | 9 | 7 | 4 | 11 | 27 |
| AHL totals | | | 245 | 39 | 49 | 88 | 473 | 7 | 1 | 1 | 2 | 17 |
| BISL totals | | | 213 | 70 | 90 | 160 | 569 | 48 | 18 | 22 | 40 | 155 |

Awards and achievements
| Preceded by Jason Soules | Edmonton Oilers first-round draft pick 1990 | Succeeded by Tyler Wright |
