= Manchester Storm =

Manchester Storm may refer to:

- Manchester Storm (1995–2002), an ice hockey team from Manchester, England
- Manchester Storm (2015), a British professional ice hockey team founded in 2015
