= Marc Laniel =

Canadian ice hockey player

- Born: January 16, 1968 (age 58) Oshawa, Ontario, Canada
- Height: 6 ft 1 in (185 cm)
- Weight: 190 lb (86 kg; 13 st 8 lb)
- Position: Defence
- Shot: Left
- Played for: Utica Devils; Phoenix Roadrunners; Winston-Salem Thunderbirds; San Diego Gulls; Birmingham Bulls; Cincinnati Cyclones; Fredericton Canadiens; Houston Aeros; Las Vegas Thunder; Fort Wayne Komets; Schwenningen Wild Wings; Essen Mosquitoes; Sheffield Steelers
- NHL draft: 62nd overall, 1986; New Jersey Devils
- Playing career: 1987–2003

Marc Laniel (born January 16, 1968, in Oshawa, Ontario) is a retired professional ice hockey defenceman. He was drafted in the third round, 62nd overall, by the New Jersey Devils in the 1986 NHL entry draft. He played the first ten years of his professional career, 1987 to 1997, playing for various teams in the American Hockey League, the International Hockey League and the East Coast Hockey League. He then spent four season playing in the German Deutsche Eishockey Liga before playing his final two seasons, 2001–02 and 2002–03, in the United Kingdom playing for the Sheffield Steelers.

== Career statistics ==
			Regular season					Playoffs				
Season	Team	League	GP	G	A	Pts	PIM	GP	G	A	Pts	PIM
1987–88	Utica Devils	AHL	2	0	0	0	0	--	--	--	--	--
1988–89	Utica Devils	AHL	80	6	28	34	43	5	0	1	1	2
1989–90	Phoenix Roadrunners	IHL	26	3	15	18	10	--	--	--	--	--
1989–90	Utica Devils	AHL	20	0	0	0	25	--	--	--	--	--
1990–91	Utica Devils	AHL	57	6	9	15	45	--	--	--	--	--
1991–92	Winston-Salem Thunderbirds	ECHL	57	15	36	51	90	5	2	5	7	4
1991–92	San Diego Gulls	IHL	10	0	2	2	16	--	--	--	--	--
1992–93	Birmingham Bulls	ECHL	21	5	9	14	26	--	--	--	--	--
1992–93	Cincinnati Cyclones	IHL	13	1	9	10	2	--	--	--	--	--
1992–93	Fredericton Canadiens	AHL	7	0	1	1	6	5	0	2	2	23
1993–94	Fredericton Canadiens	AHL	79	6	41	47	76	--	--	--	--	--
1994–95	Cincinnati Cyclones	IHL	70	5	29	34	34	--	--	--	--	--
1994–95	Houston Aeros	IHL	2	0	0	0	0	4	0	2	2	6
1995–96	Houston Aeros	IHL	65	5	25	30	40	--	--	--	--	--
1995–96	Las Vegas Thunder	IHL	9	2	2	4	6	14	0	0	0	14
1996–97	Cincinnati Cyclones	IHL	61	4	14	18	30	--	--	--	--	--
1996–97	Fort Wayne Komets	IHL	21	2	5	7	19	--	--	--	--	--
1997–98	Schwenningen Wild Wings	DEL	50	7	19	26	34					
1998–99	Schwenningen Wild Wings	DEL	52	8	10	18	53					
1999–00	Schwenningen Wild Wings	DEL	55	3	10	13	42	--	--	--	--	--
2000–01	Essen Mosquitoes	DEL	60	4	20	24	48	--	--	--	--	--
2001–02	Sheffield Steelers	ISL	48	6	18	24	30	8	2	3	5	0
2002–03	Sheffield Steelers	ISL	31	4	3	7	26	17	0	2	2	20
