= Mark Bultje =

Canadian ice hockey player

- Born: June 8, 1973 (age 51); Etobicoke, Ontario, Canada
- Height: 5 ft 10 in (178 cm)
- Weight: 187 lb (85 kg; 13 st 5 lb)
- Position: Forward
- Shot: Left
- Played for: Erie Panthers; Huntsville Blast; Geleen Eaters; Jacksonville Bullets; Jacksonville Lizard Kings; Mohawk Valley Prowlers; Winston-Salem Icehawks; London Knights; Bracknell Bees; Manchester Storm; Hull Thunder; Amsterdam Tigers; Manchester Phoenix
- National team: Netherlands
- Playing career: 1993–2005

Mark Bultje (born June 8, 1973) is a Canadian retired professional ice hockey player.

== Career ==
Born in Etobicoke, Ontario, Bultje began his career in 1993, playing for the now defunct Erie Panthers at ECHL level. After 15 games for the Panthers, he moved to ECHL rivals the Huntsville Blast. Bultje was a solid player and in 27 appearances for the two organizations, he managed 13 points and clocked 29 penalty minutes. After taking a season away from the professional game, Bultje would sign for the Jacksonville Bullets for the 1995/96 season, a team icing in the short-lived Sunshine Hockey League. After the SHL and all its teams folded at the end of the 1996 season, Bultje chose to remain in Florida, signing for the newly relocated Louisville Ice Hawks, now called the Jacksonville Lizard Kings.

In the Lizard Kings' first season in the ECHL, Bultje found himself struggling for a first team place and managed just 16 appearances all year. His next foray into professional ice hockey would be for the 1998/99 term, when he chose to sign for the UHL Mohawk Valley Prowlers. It would be one of Bultje's most productive seasons, and in 39 games he managed 42 points. Despite this production, a mid-season move would ensue for Bultje and he transferred to the Winston-Salem IceHawks, for whom he made just under 20 regular season appearances as well as assisting with the play off campaign.

Bultje would make a significant move for the 1999/00 season, and chose to ply his trade in Europe, signing for the London Knights of the ISL, the highest standard of league then present in the U.K. Bultje put in a strong showing in his first season abroad, helping the Knights into the play-offs in the process. Bultje chose to remain in England the following season, signing for the Bracknell Bees, again at ISL level. After another impressive season, Bultje would be picked up by the Manchester Storm, once the best supported ice hockey organization in Europe.

Bultje again produced, scoring almost a point a game throughout the season. Despite this, the 2002/03 season would prove to be a chaotic one for the hard-working forward. It would be split between three organizations; the Amsterdam Tigers, playing in the Dutch League, the Hull Thunder, then of the British National League and a second spell at the ill-fated Manchester Storm organization before they folded due to off ice financial problems.

Even though the previous Manchester franchise had collapsed, Bultje chose to remain in the city, and signed for the Manchester Phoenix, an organization which was established after the demise of the previous club. Bultje played for the Phoenix in their debut season, 2003/04. It was also the debut of the newly organized Elite Ice Hockey League, set up to replace the collapsing ISL.

After just 18 appearances for the Phoenix however, Bultje chose to return to Amsterdam, signing for the Bulldogs. Here he would finish the 2003/04 season before choosing to remain in the city and re-sign for the Amsterdam Tigers, for whom he would play for throughout the duration of the 2004/05 season.

== After retirement ==
Bultje retired from the game in 2005 to pursue a career outside of professional sport, and he is currently employed as a real estate agent in his native Canada.

He has one nephew, named Calvin Bultje.
