= Chris Kelland =

Canadian ice hockey player

- Born: 22 December 1957 (age 68) Sault Ste. Marie, Ontario, Canada
- Height: 5 ft 10 in (178 cm)
- Weight: 180 lb (82 kg; 12 st 12 lb)
- Position: Defence
- Played for: Murrayfield Racers; Nottingham Panthers; Sheffield Steelers; Solihull Blaze; Hull Thunder; Coventry Blaze
- National team: Great Britain
- Playing career: 1980–2001

Chris Kelland (born 22 December 1957) is a Canadian retired ice hockey defender who played his entire professional career in the United Kingdom. He also played for the Great Britain national team between 1991 and 1994. He was inducted into the British Ice Hockey Hall of Fame in 2002.

Kelland was born in Sault Ste. Marie, Ontario, Canada. After retiring from ice hockey, he joined the South Yorkshire fire service as crew manager at Mansfield Road Fire Station and appeared on TV series Total Emergency.

== Awards and honours ==
- Named to the All-star First Team in 1980–81, 1981–82, 1982–83, 1983–84, 1984–85, 1986–87 and 1987–88.
- Named World Championships Pool C Group A Best Defenceman in 1992.
- Inducted to the British Ice Hockey Hall of Fame in 2002.
- Number 21 shirt retired by Edinburgh Capitals on 15 December 2007.

== Career statistics ==
=== Club ===
			Regular season					Playoffs				
Season	Team	League	GP	G	A	Pts	PIM	GP	G	A	Pts	PIM
1980–81	Murrayfield Racers	Northern / SNL	20	11	15	26	73					
1981–82	Murrayfield Racers	Northern / SNL	19	22	15	37	102					
1982–83	Murrayfield Racers	BHL 1	24	26	23	49	95	2	1	0	1	9
1983–84	Murrayfield Racers	BHL Prem	20	12	26	38	58	5	2	4	6	58
1984–85	Murrayfield Racers	BHL Prem	32	18	34	52	145	6	3	6	9	23
1985–86	Murrayfield Racers	BHL Prem	35	33	58	91	139	6	3	6	9	8
1986–87	Murrayfield Racers	BHL Prem	35	18	93	111	107	6	5	9	14	14
1987–88	Murrayfield Racers	BHL Prem	31	28	65	93	111	5	7	10	17	15
1988–89	Murrayfield Racers	BHL Prem	35	30	78	108	78	3	1	1	2	4
1989–90	Murrayfield Racers	BHL Prem	23	9	23	32	30	6	2	3	5	10
1990–91	Murrayfield Racers	BHL Prem	36	10	29	39	112					
1991–92	Nottingham Panthers	BHL Prem	36	10	38	48	118	8	0	3	3	14
1992–93	Nottingham Panthers	BHL Prem	27	11	42	53	42					
1993–94	Sheffield Steelers	BHL Prem	42	7	41	48	127	8	1	7	8	24
1994–95	Sheffield Steelers	BHL Prem	44	14	54	68	90	8	5	4	9	8
1995–96	Sheffield Steelers	BHL Prem	35	8	23	31	51	8	2	3	5	6
1996–97	Sheffield Steelers	ISL	42	2	7	9	20	8	0	0	0	2
1997–98	Sheffield Steelers	ISL	25	0	4	4	10	8	0	1	1	6
1998–99	Solihull Blaze	ENIHL	21	10	35	45	28					
1999–00	Hull Thunder	BNL	6	0	4	4	10	6	0	3	3	22
2000–01	Coventry Blaze	BNL	5	0	1	1	2					

=== International ===
			Tournament				
Year	Team	Event	GP	G	A	Pts	PIM
1991	Great Britain	World Championships Pool C	7	3	2	5	22
1992	Great Britain	World Championships Pool C	5	1	4	5	4
1993	Great Britain	World Championships Pool B	5	0	0	0	4
1994	Great Britain	World Championships Pool A	6	0	0	0	8
