= Sheffield Steelers =

Ice hockey club in Sheffield, England

- City: Sheffield, England
- League: Elite Ice Hockey League
- Founded: 1991
- Operated: Sheffield Steelers
- Home arena: Utilita Arena Sheffield (capacity: 9,512)
- Colours: Orange, black, white
- Mascot: Steeler Dan
- Owner: Tony Smith
- Head coach: Aaron Fox
- Captain: Robert Dowd
- Affiliates: Sheffield Steeldogs

Championships
- Regular season titles: 1994–95, 1995–96, 2000–01, 2002–03, 2003–04, 2008–09, 2010–11, 2014–15, 2015–16, 2023–24
- Autumn Cups: 1995–96, 2000–01
- Challenge Cups: 1998–99, 1999–00, 2000–01, 2002–03, 2019–20, 2023–24
- Playoff championships: 1994–95, 1995–96, 1996–97, 2000–01, 2001–02, 2003–04, 2007–08, 2008–09, 2013–14, 2016–17, 2023–24
- 20/20 Hockey Fest: 2009–10

The Sheffield Steelers (Note: Known officially as the DSM Sheffield Steelers due to sponsorship.) are a professional ice hockey team located in Sheffield, England. They were formed in 1991 and play their home games at the Utilita Arena. They are currently a member of the Elite Ice Hockey League.

== History ==
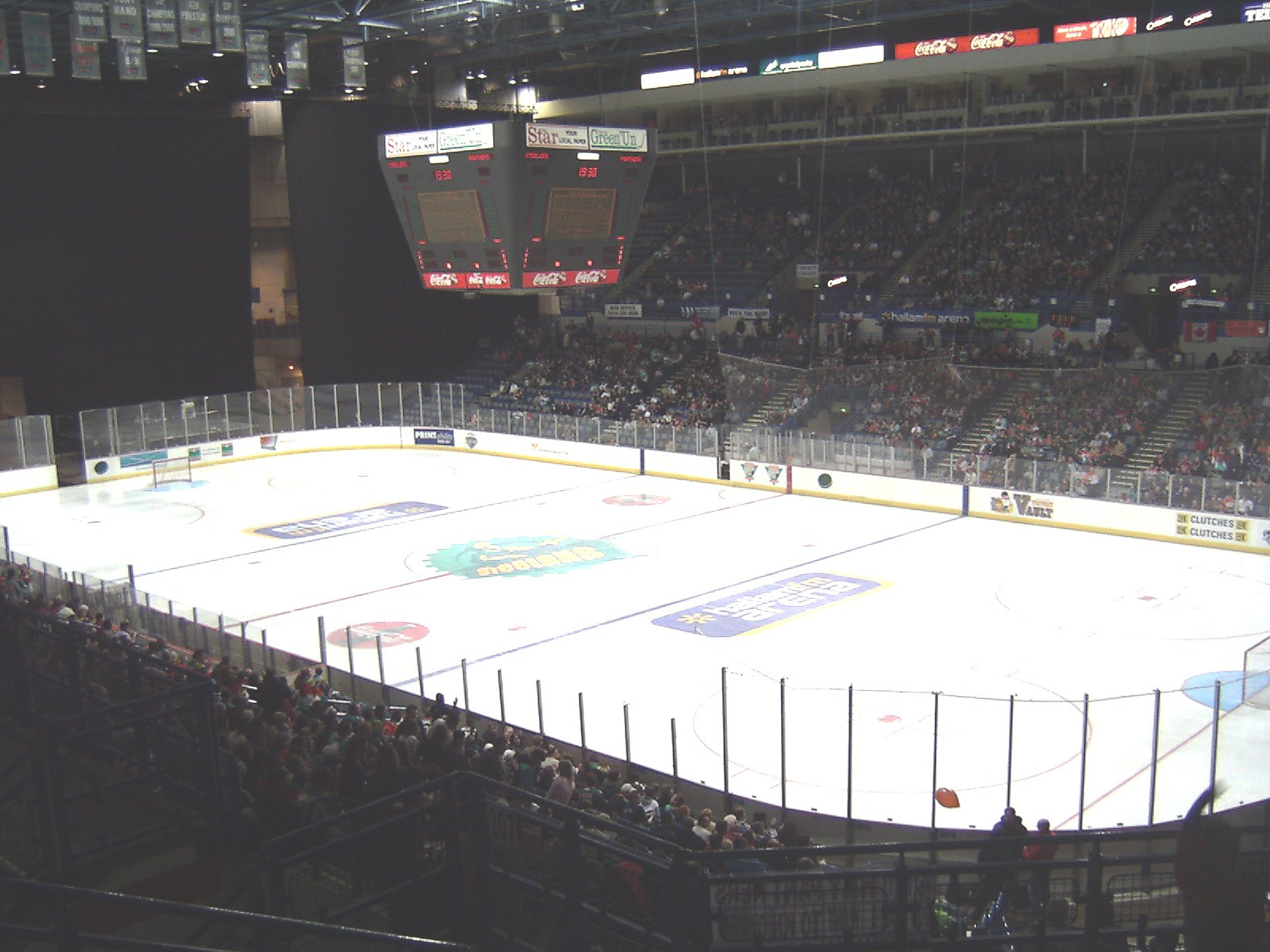
Sheffield Arena: home of the Steelers in 1997

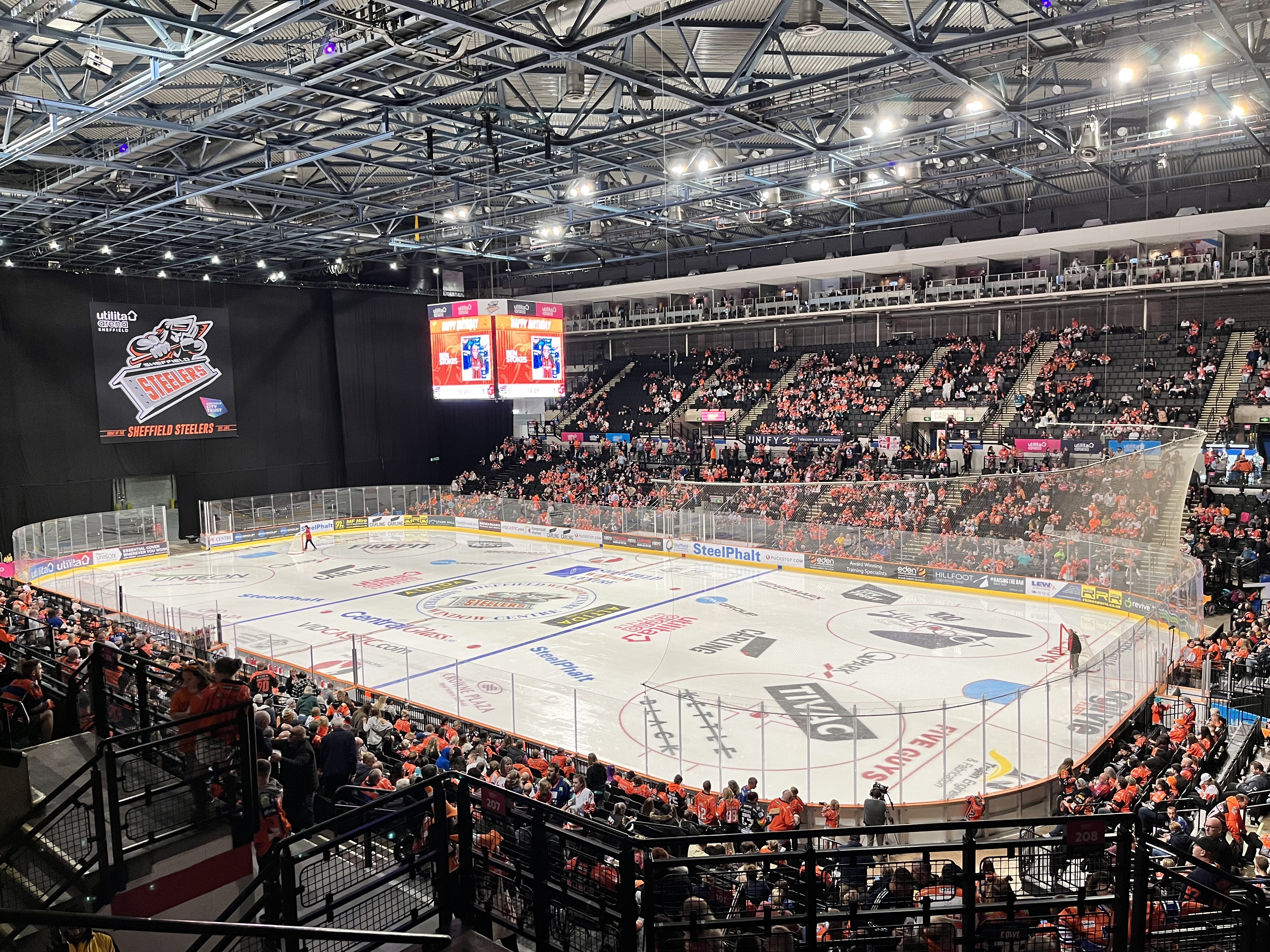
Sheffield Arena: home of the Steelers twenty-five years later in 2022

Ice hockey was played in amateur form in Sheffield, but the sport began its return to an era of arenas and stadium size crowds with the opening of the Sheffield Arena in 1991 and the creation of the Sheffield Steelers — the ice hockey team that was to occupy the new arena. The Sheffield Arena was built as part of the city's facilities for the staging of the World Student Games, and is a sizeable stadium originally seating 8,500 and located close to the city centre. Ronnie Wood and David Gardener-Brown were at the helm as the Marketing Director at the club and set about promoting ice hockey to a city with two long established football clubs, Sheffield United and Sheffield Wednesday. Wood had a specific target, seeking to attract children and families to the city's new sporting Arena. They also began taking players to local football matches and together with mascots in an attempt to attract football fans. The Steelers' announcer David Simms gave certain players nicknames in the 1991–92 season to help the crowd associate with the players such as 'Rocket' Ron Shudra, 'Stormin' Steve Nemeth and 'Magic' Mark Mackie. This tradition has continued with more modern players like 'the Golden child' Robert Dowd.

The Steelers were named in honour of Sheffield's industrial past, much like the American football team of the same name based in Pittsburgh, Pennsylvania, the sharing of nicknames is merely a coincidence. The American football team predates Sheffield's team by 58 years. Sheffield and Pittsburgh are considered sister cities.

The Steelers have continued to fill the capacity of the Arena nearly every season since, including over 9,000 vs Nottingham on Boxing Day 2021 and then over 9,500 the same day four years later, following the introduction of premium "Sky's Edge" seating . Sheffield began breaking several British ice hockey attendance records, and in March 1996 added an extra 1,200 seats to the Arena to meet the growing demand. The Manchester v Sheffield game in 1997 had a UK record 17,245.

On Sunday 3 December 2006, the Steelers played in their 1000th ever game. The game was against the Basingstoke Bison at the Hallam FM Arena, for which special orange jerseys had been made for the match. The Steelers lost the game 3–2 and the jerseys were all auctioned off at the game.

=== 2000–present ===
In the 2000–01 campaign the Steelers completed a Grand Slam, becoming only the second club to win the Autumn Cup, League, Challenge Cup and Playoff Titles in the same season. They retained the Play-off title the following season, the first team to achieve this in the Superleague era, beating Manchester Storm on penalties in the Play-Off final, held at the National Ice Centre in Nottingham in front of a full house.

David Matsos was appointed as coach for the 2006–07 season. He led the Steelers to a fourth-place finish in the league and a place in the Challenge Cup Finals.

In 2007 team Owner Bob Phillips and his wife sold their other Elite League club, the Cardiff Devils, in order to concentrate on building the Steelers. The club won that season's Elite League Playoff Championship after beating the Coventry Blaze 2–0 in the final with goals from Jonathan Phillips and Dan Tessier. The Steelers were knocked out of the following season's Knockout Cup and Challenge Cup early, but finished first in a league campaign that saw them lose just three times in regulation. They made this a double by beating Nottingham Panthers 2–0 in the Play-Off final. The Steelers season ended in the Quarter Finals of the Play-offs after being knocked out by the Cardiff Devils.

The 2010–11 season was preceded by a "walk-out" of Steelers management and office staff, after a vote of no confidence in Owner Bob Phillips. Phillips put the club up for sale, and in December 2010 Paul Ragan, the CEO and owner of the Cardiff Devils, finalised acquiring the rights to the Sheffield Steelers. The Steelers were at the top of the league for the majority of the season, battling it out with the Cardiff Devils, and won the league after back-to-back victories against the Braehead Clan. The Steelers were tied on points with Cardiff but won the league having more regulation time wins. After several rounds of negotiations, Simon decided not to renew his contract, and Ryan Finnerty was installed as player/coach after. During that season Sheffield Steelers became the first EIHL team to win a medal in Europe after their appearance in the Continental Cup superfinal.

Tony Smith took over as sole owner in August 2011 after buying out Paul Ragan. The Steelers won the 2013–14 Play-Off final 3–2 against Belfast Giants.

From 2014 onwards, any time that the Sheffield Steelers win a home game the player dubbed Man of the Match does a fast lap around the ice with a pre-planned celebration at the end of their fast lap. This tradition was then called "the Eddy" named after the player who originated this tradition Cullen Eddy. Some sources say that this was originally a prank devised by players at the time Mark Thomas and Jason Hewitt who skated over to Eddy and told him that it was a 20 year tradition at the club to do a fast lap around the perimeter of the ice. The prank paid off and after that the Steelers incorporated this in their match night celebrations

At the end of season 2014–15 they beat the Cardiff Devils to clinch the Elite League title with 74 points. On 20 April 2015, they parted company with coach Gerad Adams. They soon brought in Paul Thompson, former GB coach, as head coach and general manager. At the end of season 2015–16 they became only the second club in the history of ice hockey to become back to back champions when they defeated the Fife Flyers on the final day of the season to take the title.

Paul Thompson left the Sheffield Steelers on 1 October 2018, citing personal reasons. He was replaced as head coach by Tom Barrasso. On 16 April 2019 the club announced that Aaron Fox had been appointed as head coach and general manager of the club. On 8 March 2020, the Steelers won the 2019–20 Challenge Cup beating Cardiff Devils 4–3 – their first Challenge Cup title for 17 years.

On 28 October 2023, during a game against the Sheffield Steelers at Utilita Arena, Adam Johnson of the Nottingham Panthers sustained a fatal injury. The injury occurred when Johnson's neck came into contact with the skate of Steelers player Matt Petgrave. The game was halted immediately, and medical personnel from both teams, as well as medically trained spectators, rushed to assist. Players from both teams gathered around Johnson during the emergency response efforts. South Yorkshire Police conducted an investigation into the incident . On 29 April 2025 the Crown Prosecution Service announced that there was no reasonable chance of a conviction, so no criminal charges would be brought in relation to Johnson's death and the case closed.

On 13 March 2024, the Sheffield Steelers brought an end to their four year trophy drought by winning the Challenge Cup at home against the Guildford Flames 3–1, their second Challenge Cup title in the Elite League era. On 24 March 2024, the Sheffield Steelers would clinch the Elite League title for the first time since the 2015–16 EIHL season qualifying them for the 2024–25 Champions Hockey League season. They would go on to secure the Grand Slam the next month, winning all the available trophies in the 2023–24 EIHL, winning the Playoff title at the National Ice Centre in Nottingham, in a 3–1 victory over the Belfast Giants.

== Head coach and captain history ==
=== Captains ===
| Name | Tenure |
|---|---|
| Bernard Serafinski | 1991–92 |
| Ron Shudra | 1992–96 |
| Rob Wilson | 1996–00 |
| Dennis Vial | 2000–01 |
| Paul Kruse | 2001–02 |
| Marc Laniel | 2002–03 |
| Dion Darling | 2003–05 |
| Mark Dutiaume | 2005–06 |
| Shawn Maltby | 2006–07 |
| Jonathan Phillips | 2007–13 |
| Steven Goertzen | 2013–14 |
| Jonathan Phillips | 2014–23 |
| Robert Dowd | 2023–Present |

=== Head coaches ===
| Name | Tenure |
|---|---|
| Ronnie Wood | 1991–92 |
| Alex Dampier | 1992–98 |
| Don McKee | 1998–99 |
| Mike Blaisdell | 1999–04 |
| Rob Stewart | 2004–05 |
| Paul Heavey | 2005 |
| Dennis Maxwell | 2005–06 |
| Dave Whistle | 2006 |
| David Matsos | 2006–10 |
| Ben Simon | 2010–11 |
| Ryan Finnerty | 2011–13 |
| Doug Christiansen | 2013–14 |
| Gerad Adams | 2014–15 |
| Paul Thompson | 2015–18 |
| Tom Barrasso | 2018–19 |
| Aaron Fox | 2019–Present |

== Current squad ==
Squad for 2026–27 Elite League season

- * Denotes two-way deal with Sheffield Steeldogs of the NIHL
- ** Denotes two-way deal with the Deeside Dragons of the NIHL 1

Netminders
| No. | Nat. | Player | Catches | Acquired | Place of Birth | Joined from | Press Release |
|---|---|---|---|---|---|---|---|
| 1 | (United States) | Matt Greenfield | L | 2022 | Parkland, US | Kansas City Mavericks, ECHL |
| 32 | (England) | Alex Oldale* | L | 2025 | Sheffield, England | Manchester Storm, EIHL |
| 34 | (England) | Curtis Warburton** | R | 2024 | Rotherham, England | Solway Sharks, NIHL |
| 44 | (England) | Lucas Brine | L | 2026 | Chertsey, England | Glasgow Clan, EIHL |

Defencemen
| No. | Nat. | Player | Shoots | Acquired | Place of Birth | Joined from | Press Release |
|---|---|---|---|---|---|---|---|
| 2 | (United States) | Robbie Stucker | R | 2026 | Saint Paul, US | Utah Grizzlies, ECHL |
| 3 | (England) (Canada) | Liam Steele | R | 2025 | Cobham, England | Cornell Big Red, NCAA Division I |
| 57 | (United States) | Logan Roe | L | 2026 | Cape Coral, US | Steinbach Black Wings Linz, ICEHL |
| 58 | (Canada) | Dominic Cormier | L | 2023 | Moncton, Canada | Stjernen Hockey, Eliteserien |
| 59 | (Canada) | Macoy Erkamps A | R | 2026 | Delta, Canada | Iserlohn Roosters, DEL |
| 65 | (United States) | Brien Diffley | L | 2023 | Burlington, US | Odense Bulldogs, Metal Ligaen |
| 77 | (Finland) | Aatu Aarnio | L | 2026 | Naantali, Finland | Vaasan Sport, Liiga |

Forwards
| No. | Nat. | Player | Position | Acquired | Place of Birth | Joined from | Press Release |
|---|---|---|---|---|---|---|---|
| 8 | (United States) | Ryan Tait | RW/C | 2025 | Santa Clarita, US | Guildford Flames, EIHL |
| 10 | (England) | Jordan O’Brien* | F | 2026 | Blackburn, England | Peterborough Petes U18 AAA, OMHA |
| 10 | (United States) | Nick Hutchison | C/LW | 2026 | Hicksville, US | EC VSV, ICEHL |
| 25 | (United States) | Tim Gettinger | LW/C | 2026 | Cleveland, US | Schwenninger Wild Wings, DEL |
| 62 | (Canada) | Evan Jasper A | C/LW | 2025 | Whitby, Canada | Vienna Capitals, ICEHL |
| 63 | (Finland) | Mikko Juusola | LW/RW | 2023 | Kuusamo, Finland | HC Energie Karlovy Vary, Czech Extraliga |
| 64 | (Sweden) | Marcus Bergman | LW/RW | 2026 | Sweden | Nybro Vikings, HockeyAllsvenskan |
| 71 | (Finland) | Leevi Teissala | RW | 2026 | Turku, Finland | Södertälje SK, HockeyAllsvenskan |
| 72 | (Scotland) (Sweden) | Ivan Björkly Nordström | RW | 2024 | Edinburgh, Scotland | Peterborough Phantoms, NIHL |
| 74 | (Canada) (United Kingdom) | Brandon Whistle | C | 2026 | Kelowna, Canada | Belfast Giants, EIHL |
| 75 | (England) (United Kingdom) | Robert Dowd C | LW/C | 2021 | Billingham, England | HC Eppan Pirates, Italy2 |
| 81 | (Canada) | Sean Collins A | C/LW | 2026 | Saskatoon, Canada | Black Wings Linz, ICEHL |
| 88 | (Scotland) | Bailey Yates* | C | 2025 | Lanarkshire, Scotland | Utah Outliers, USPHL |
| 91 | (Canada) | Adam Rockwood | C | 2026 | Coquitlam, Canada | BIK Karlskoga, HockeyAllsvenskan |
| 92 | (Canada) | Mitchell Balmas A | LW/C | 2023 | Sydney, Canada | Iowa Wild, AHL |
| 93 | (Canada) | Olivier Archambault | LW/RW | 2026 | Le Gardeur, Canada | Ducs d'Angers, Ligue Magnus |

Team Staff
| No. | Nat. | Name | Position | Place of Birth | Joined from | Press Release |
|---|---|---|---|---|---|---|
| N/A | (United States) | Aaron Fox | Head coach | Hastings, US | KHL Medveščak Zagreb, EBEL |
| N/A | (Canada) | Carter Beston-Will | Assistant coach | Calgary, Canada | KHL Medveščak Zagreb, EBEL |
| N/A | (England) | Andrew Akers | Equipment Manager | Sheffield, England | No Team |

Recent departures
| No. | Nat. | Player | Position | Acquired | Place of Birth | Leaving For | Press Release |
|---|---|---|---|---|---|---|---|
| 5 | (Finland) | Joona Huttula A | D | 2024 | Tampere, Finland | GKS Katowice, Polska Hokej Liga |
| 6 | (Canada) | Kevin Tansey A | D | 2023 | Hammond, Canada | Madawaska Valley Wolves, Northern Premier Hockey League |
| 10 | (Canada) | Jordon Southorn | D | 2025 | Montreal, Canada | Retired |
| 13 | (Canada) | Mitchell Heard | C | 2025 | Bowmanville, Canada | Trenton Ironhawks, ECHL |
| 14 | (Canada) | Patrick Watling | C | 2025 | Sault Ste. Marie, Canada | Retired |
| 15 | (Canada) | Stephen Harper | LW/C/D | 2025 | Hamilton, Canada | Maine Mariners, ECHL |
| 17 | (Scotland) | Joe Lynch | C/LW | 2025 | Kirkcaldy, Scotland | Solway IHC, NIHL |
| 18 | (Canada) | Samuel Tremblay | C | 2025 | Saint-Basile-le-Grand, Canada | Atlanta Gladiators, ECHL |
| 23 | (Canada) | Brett Ritchie | RW | 2026 | Orangeville, Canada | Vlci Žilina, Slovak Extraliga |
| 27 | (England) | Cole Shudra | F/D | 2021 | Rotherham, England | Belfast Giants, EIHL |
| 37 | (United States) | Eamon McAdam | G | 2025 | Perkasie, US | TBC |
| 55 | (United States) | Jack Dougherty | D | 2025 | Saint Paul, US | Orlando Solar Bears, ECHL |
| 67 | (Scotland) | Reece Kelly | D | 2025 | Fife, Scotland | Fife Flyers, EIHL |
| 73 | (England) | Kyle Watson | F | 2025 | Wakefield, England | Fife Flyers, EIHL |

== Honoured members ==
The Steelers have retired the numbers of six players. Ronnie Wood's number 7 and Tim Cranston's number 4 have been retired. Tony Hand's number 16 and Ken Priestlay's number 9 were retired on 21 January 2003 at a challenge match against the Dundee Stars, with Ron Shudra's number 26 retired in summer 2009. Tommy Plommer's number 11 has also been retired.

Eight people who have been associated with the Steelers have been inducted to the British Ice Hockey Hall of Fame. Alex Dampier, who coached the Steelers from January 1993 to the end of the 1997–98 season, was inducted in 1995 and Mike Blaisdell, who coached and occasionally iced for the Steelers between 1999 and 2004, was inducted in 2004. On the player front, Chris Kelland was inducted in 2002, Rick Brebant in 2004, Paul Adey in 2006, Scott Neil in 2007, and most recently, legendary players Tim Cranston and 'Rocket' Ron Shudra in December 2010.

The Steelers started their own Hall of Fame in 2005 in which honoured members are voted for by the fans. There are two Hall of Fames: The Players Hall of Fame and the Backroom Staff Hall of Fame. Ken Priestlay, Tommy Plommer, Scott Allison and Tim Cranston were inducted to the Players Hall of Fame in 2005 and Ron Shudra and Mike Blaisdell were inducted in 2006. David Simms, responsible for press and media at the club, and Andy Akers, Equipment Manager, were inducted to the Backroom Staff Hall of Fame in 2006 and Mike O'Connor, general manager, was inducted in 2007.

== Honours and awards ==
League Championships

- 1994–95, 1995–96, 2000–01, 2002–03, 2003–04, 2008–09, 2010–11, 2014–15, 2015–16, 2023–24

Play Off Championships

- 1994–95, 1995–96, 1996–97, 2000–01, 2001–02, 2003–04, 2007–08, 2008–09, 2013–14, 2016–17, 2023–24

Autumn Cups

- 1995–96, 2000–01

Challenge Cups

- 1998–99, 1999–00, 2000–01, 2002–03, 2019–20, 2023–24

20–20 Hockeyfest Tournament

- 2009–10

Player of the Year Trophy

- Ed Courtenay – 1999–00
- David Longstaff – 2000–01
- Joel Laing – 2002–03
- Mathieu Roy – 2014–15

Coach of the Year Trophy

- Mike Blaisdell – 2000–01, 2002–03, 2003–04
- David Matsos – 2008–09

The Ice Hockey Annual Trophy (Leading British points scorer)

- Tony Hand – 1998–99

First Team All-Star

- 1994–95 – Martin McKay
- 1995–96 – Wayne Cowley, Tony Hand, Ken Priestlay
- 1997–98 – Ed Courtenay
- 1998–99 – Ed Courtenay, Scott Knowles
- 1999–00 – Ed Courtenay
- 2000–01 – Shayne McCosh, David Longstaff
- 2002–03 – Joel Laing, Marc Laniel
- 2003–04 – Dion Darling, Kevin Bolibruck, Mark Dutiaume
- 2006–07 – Dan Tessier
- 2008–09 – Jody Lehman, Rod Sarich, Steve Munn
- 2010–11 – Ervins Mustukovs
- 2014–15 – Ben O'Connor, Michael Forney, Mathieu Roy
- 2015–16 – Ben O'Connor, Tyler Mosienko
- 2016–17 – Mathieu Roy
- 2021–22 – Marc-Olivier Vallerand
- 2023–24 – Matt Greenfield, Kevin Tansey, Patrick Watling, Mitchell Balmas
- 2024–25 – Matt Greenfield
- 2025–26 – Mitchell Balmas

Second Team All-Star

- 1999–00 – Shayne McCosh, Teeder Wynne
- 2000–01 – Adam Smith
- 2001–02 – Scott Allison
- 2002–03 – Dion Darling, Rhett Gordon
- 2003–04 – Erik Anderson
- 2005–06 – Mark Dutiaume
- 2007–08 – Rod Sarich
- 2010–11 – Jeff Legue, Joey Talbot
- 2011–12 – Jeff Legue
- 2015–16 – Mathieu Roy
- 2017–18 – Ervins Mustukovs, Mark Matheson
- 2019–20 – Marek Troncinsky, Brendan Connolly, Marc-Olivier Vallerand
- 2021–22 – Daine Todd
- 2022–23 – Matt Greenfield
- 2023–24 – Colton Saucerman
- 2024–25 – Dominic Cormier

== Grand slam winning teams ==
The Steelers have won the Grand Slam of all available trophies three times in their history. In the 1995–96 season they won the Benson & Hedges Cup, the league championship and the playoffs. In the 2000–01 season they won the Benson & Hedges Cup, the Challenge Cup, the league championship and the playoffs. In the 2023–24 season they won the Challenge Cup, the league championship and the playoffs. The players who played for the Steelers those seasons were:

=== 1995–96 team ===
Goaltenders

- Wayne Cowley
- Dave Graham (went to Guildford Flames after three games)
- Martin McKay

Defenders

- Neil Abel
- Perry Doyle
- Scott Heaton
- Chris Kelland
- Andre Malo
- Mike O'Connor
- Ron Shudra
- Jamie Van der Horst
- Rob Wilson
- Mark Wright

Forwards

- Scott Knowles
- Nicky Chinn
- Tim Cranston
- Justin George
- Tony Hand
- David Longstaff (joined from Newcastle Warriors part way through the season)
- Tommy Plommer
- Ken Priestlay
- Les Millie (went to Fife Flyers after five games)
- Scott Neil
- Steve Nemeth

=== 2000–01 team ===
Goaltenders

- Mike O'Neill
- Mike Torchia

Defenders

- Steve Carpenter
- Shayne McCosh
- Jeff Sebastian
- Kayle Short
- Adam Smith
- Dennis Vial

Forwards

- Paul Adey
- Scott Allison
- Paul Beraldo
- Mike Blaisdell, Coach (played four games injury cover)
- Brent Bobyck (joined from Bracknell Bees part way through the season then went to Manchester Storm after 32 games)
- Rick Brebant
- Dale Craigwell
- David Longstaff
- Scott Metcalfe
- Warren Norris
- Steve Roberts (went to Belfast Giants after 27 games)
- Kent Simpson
- Jason Weaver

=== 2023–24 team ===
Goaltenders

- Matthew Greenfield
- Daniel Crowe
- Anthony Morrone
- Angus Laing

Defenders

- Kevin Tansey
- Zach Vinnell (joined from Glasgow Clan mid-season)
- Matt Petgrave (did not play following Adam Johnson incident)
- Colton Saucerman
- Sam Cooper
- Sam Jones
- Niklas Nevalainen
- Dominic Cormier (joined from Stjernen Hockey mid-season)
- Brien Diffley

Forwards

- Josh Nicholls
- Daniel Ciampini
- Patrick Watling
- Finlay Ulrick
- Patrick Harper (joined from South Carolina Stingrays mid-season)
- Jonathan Phillips (played two games with the Steelers due to international commitments of other players)
- Mark Simpson
- Brett Neumann
- Cole Shudra
- Scott Allen
- Kameron Kielly (went to South Carolina Stingrays mid-season)
- Mikko Juusola
- Brandon Whistle
- Robert Dowd
- Marc-Olivier Vallerand
- Mitchell Balmas

== Season-by-season record ==
Note: GP = Games played, W = Wins, L = Losses, T = Ties, OTL = Overtime losses, Pts = Points, GF = Goals for, GA = Goals against

| Season | League | GP | W | L | T | OTL | Pts | GF | GA | Final League Position |
| 1991–92 | English League Division 1 | 32 | 27 | 4 | 1 | 0 | 55 | 378 | 163 | 2nd |
| 1992–93 | British League Division 1 | 32 | 22 | 6 | 4 | 0 | 48 | 300 | 186 | 2nd |
| 1993–94 | British League Premier Division | 44 | 28 | 12 | 4 | 0 | 55^{†} | 313 | 198 | 3rd^{†} |
| 1994–95 | British League Premier Division | 44 | 35 | 5 | 4 | 0 | 74 | 334 | 183 | 1st |
| 1995–96 | British League Premier Division | 36 | 27 | 4 | 5 | 0 | 59 | 268 | 122 | 1st |
| 1996–97 | Ice Hockey Superleague | 44 | 27 | 11 | 4 | 2 | 60 | 168 | 127 | 2nd |
| 1997–98 | Ice Hockey Superleague | 44 | 20 | 18 | 3 | 3 | 50 | 169 | 163 | 6th |
| 1998–99 | Ice Hockey Superleague | 42 | 17 | 19 | 4 | 2 | 40 | 135 | 141 | 6th |
| 1999–00 | Ice Hockey Superleague | 42 | 24 | 14 | 2 | 2 | 52 | 188 | 155 | 2nd |
| 2000–01 | Ice Hockey Superleague | 48 | 35 | 9 | 0 | 4 | 104^{‡} | 162 | 115 | 1st |
| 2001–02 | Ice Hockey Superleague | 48 | 18 | 18 | 12 | 0 | 48 | 138 | 144 | 3rd |
| 2002–03 | Ice Hockey Superleague | 32 | 18 | 8 | 5 | 1 | 42 | 162 | 115 | 1st^{††} |
| 2003–04 | Elite Ice Hockey League | 56 | 44 | 8 | 3 | 1 | 92 | 214 | 106 | 1st |
| 2004–05 | Elite Ice Hockey League | 50 | 25 | 17 | 5 | 3 | 58 | 118 | 110 | 5th |
| 2005–06 | Elite Ice Hockey League | 42 | 15 | 19 | 6 | 2 | 38 | 105 | 135 | 6th |
| 2006–07 | Elite Ice Hockey League | 54 | 30 | 16 | – | 8 | 68 | 163 | 154 | 3rd |
| 2007–08 | Elite Ice Hockey League | 54 | 38 | 14 | – | 2 | 78 | 190 | 129 | 2nd |
| 2008–09 | Elite Ice Hockey League | 54 | 41 | 6 | – | 7 | 89 | 201 | 115 | 1st |
| 2009–10 | Elite Ice Hockey League | 56 | 24 | 26 | – | 6 | 54 | 194 | 196 | 5th |
| 2010–11 | Elite Ice Hockey League | 54 | 43 | 10 | – | 1 | 87 | 265 | 132 | 1st |
| 2011–12 | Elite Ice Hockey League | 54 | 41 | 11 | – | 2 | 84 | 209 | 130 | 2nd |
| 2012–13 | Elite Ice Hockey League | 52 | 35 | 14 | – | 3 | 73 | 184 | 133 | 3rd |
| 2013–14 | Elite Ice Hockey League | 52 | 31 | 17 | – | 4 | 66 | 172 | 141 | 2nd |
| 2014–15 | Elite Ice Hockey League | 52 | 35 | 13 | – | 4 | 74 | 193 | 134 | 1st |
| 2015–16 | Elite Ice Hockey League | 52 | 34 | 14 | – | 4 | 72 | 190 | 161 | 1st |
| 2016–17 | Elite Ice Hockey League | 52 | 35 | 14 | – | 3 | 73 | 196 | 136 | 3rd |
| 2017–18 | Elite Ice Hockey League | 56 | 34 | 19 | – | 3 | 71 | 217 | 140 | 3rd |
| 2018–19 | Elite Ice Hockey League | 60 | 30 | 26 | – | 4 | 64 | 183 | 203 | 7th |
| 2019–20 | Elite Ice Hockey League | 49 | 31 | 17 | – | 1 | 63 | 211 | 154 | 2nd^{†††} |
| 2020–21 | Elite Ice Hockey League | Cancelled | Cancelled | Cancelled | Cancelled | Cancelled | N/A | N/A | N/A | N/A^{††††} |
| 2021–22 | Elite Ice Hockey League | 54 | 37 | 10 | – | 7 | 81 | 202 | 138 | 2nd |
| 2022–23 | Elite Ice Hockey League | 54 | 36 | 13 | – | 5 | 77 | 190 | 129 | 3rd |
| 2023–24 | Elite Ice Hockey League | 54 | 45 | 8 | – | 1 | 91 | 228 | 113 | 1st |
| 2024–25 | Elite Ice Hockey League | 54 | 37 | 14 | – | 3 | 77 | 217 | 137 | 2nd |
| 2025–26 | Elite Ice Hockey League | 54 | 33 | 15 | – | 6 | 72 | 196 | 138 | 4th |

^{†}Finished second with 60 points. However, five points were deducted for breaking the wage cap
^{‡}Three points were awarded for a win in the 2000–01 season
^{††}Five team league
^{†††}The 2019–20 season was cancelled in March 2020, with Sheffield having played 49 games, due to the coronavirus pandemic. The above stats reflect the Steelers' position at the time of the cancellation.
^{††††}The 2020–21 Elite League season – originally scheduled for a revised start date of 5 December – was suspended on 15 September 2020, because of ongoing coronavirus pandemic restrictions. The EIHL board determined that the season was non-viable without supporters being permitted to attend matches and unanimously agreed to a suspension. The season was cancelled completely in February 2021. Sheffield were later announced as one of four Elite League teams taking part in the 'Elite Series' between April–May 2021, a total of 24 games culminating in a best-of-three play-off final series.

== Club records ==
=== League titles ===
- British Premier Division Titles: 2 (1994/95, 1995/96)
- Superleague Titles: 2 (2000/01, 2002/03)
- Elite League Titles: 6 (2003/04, 2008/09, 2010/11, 2014/15, 2015/16, 2023/24)

=== Cup titles ===
- Yorkshire Cup: 2 (1993/94, 1994/95)
- Benson & Hedges Cup: 2 (1995/95, 2000/01)
- Challenge Cup: 6 (1998/99, 1999/00, 2000/01, 2002/03, 2019/20, 2023/24)
- Knockout Cup: 1 (2005/06)
- 20/20 Hockeyfest: 1 (2009/10)
- Charity Shield: 1 (2009/10)

=== Play-off titles ===
- British Championship: 11 (1994/95, 1995/96, 1996/97, 2000/01, 2001/02, 2003/04, 2007/08, 2009/09, 2013/14, 2016/17, 2023/24)

=== Team records ===
- Most points in a season: 104 --- 3 pts for a win (2000/01) 92 --- 2 pts for a win (2003/04)
- Most wins in a season: 45 (2023/24)
- Most regulation losses in a season: 26 (2009/10, 2018/19)
- Most overtime losses in a season: 8 (2006/07)
- Most ties in a season: 12 (2001/02) --- ties ceased after the 2005/06 Season
- Most goals scored in regular season: 378 (1991/92)
- Most goals conceded in regular season: 203 (2018/19)
- Fewest goals scored in regular season: 86 (2002/03) Note 32-game season.
- Fewest goals conceded in regular season: 57 (2002/03) Note 32-game season.
- Highest league position: 1st (1994/95, 1995/96, 2000/01, 2002/03, 2003/04, 2008/09, 2010/11, 2014/15, 2023/24)
- Lowest league position: 7th (2018/19)
- Most goals scored in a single game (competitive): 30 (30–4 .v. Solent Vikings, 15 March 1992)
- Most goals conceded in a single game (competitive): 14 (14–3 @ Basingstoke Beavers, 7 November 1992, 14–10 @ Durham Wasps, 18 September 1993)
- Biggest winning margin at home (competitive): 26 goals (30–4 .v. Solent Vikings, 15 March 1992)
- Biggest winning margin on the road (competitive): 25 goals (4–29 @ Sunderland Chiefs, 28 December 1991)
- Biggest losing margin at home (competitive): 6 goals (2–8 .v. Whitley Warriors, 16 October 1993, 0–6 .v. London Knights, 11 September 1999, 1–7 .v. Belfast Giants, 19 February 2006, 1–7 .v. Cardiff Devils, 12 January 2011, 0–6 .v. Coventry Blaze, 1 March 2025)
- Biggest losing margin on the Road (competitive): 11 goals (14–3 @ Basingstoke Beavers, 7 November 1992, 12–1 @ Cardiff Devils, 24 April 1994)
- No. of Teams shutout (all time): 97
- Most shutouts in a season (team, all comps): 11 (2010/11, 2023/24)
- Team shutout most (all time): Nottingham Panthers (21)
- No. of times shutout (all time): 70
- Most times shutout in a season (all comps): 8 (2005/06)
- Team most shutout against (all time): Nottingham Panthers (14)
- Longest winning streak (all comps): 13 games (7 September 2000 – 11 October 2000)
- Longest losing streak (all comps): 7 games (23 February 2003 – 15 March 2003)
- Longest unbeaten streak (home, all comps): 53 games (49 Wins, 4 Ties – 27 December 1993 to 19 October 1996)
- Highest attendance (home): 10,136 (Sheffield Steelers 5–2 Nottingham Panthers, 2 December 1995, Benson & Hedges Cup Final)
- Highest attendance (away): 17,245 (Manchester Storm 6–2 Sheffield Steelers, 23 February 1997, Superleague)

=== Individual records ===
- Most Games Played: Jonathan Phillips (1042)
- Most Goals Scored (All Time): Robert Dowd (361)
- Most Assists (All Time): Ron Shudra (463)
- Most Points Scored (All Time): Ron Shudra (792)
- Most Penalty Minutes (All Time): Jason Hewitt (1112)
- Most Goals Scored in a Regular Season: Steve Nemeth (92) (1991–1992)
- Most Assists in a Regular Season: Mark Mackie (101) (1991–92)
- Most Points Scored in a Regular Season: Steve Nemeth (186) (1991–92)
- Most Penalty Minutes in a Regular Season: Andrew Sharpe (230) (2008–09)
- Most Goals Scored in a Play-Off Championship: Steve Nemeth (21) (1991–92)
- Most Assists in a Play-Off Championship: Steve Nemeth (18) (1991–92)
- Most Points Scored in a Play-Off Championship: Steve Nemeth (39) (1991–92)
- Most Penalty Minutes in a Play-Off Championship: Timo Willman (77) (2002–03)

=== Goaltender records ===
- Most Games Played (All Time): Jody Lehman (252)
- Most Minutes Played (All Time): Jody Lehman (14,927)
- Most Wins (All Time): Jody Lehman (149)
- Most Losses (All Time): Jody Lehman (89)
- Most Shutouts in a Season (All Comps): Ervins Mustukovs (11) (2010–11)
- Most Shutouts (All Time): Matthew Greenfield (25)
- Best Goals Against Average (All Time): Christian Bronsard (1.23) (Min. 30 Games Played)
- Best Save Percentage (All Time): Christian Bronsard (94.5%) (Min. 30 Games Played)

== Notes ==
| Preceded by Cardiff Devils | Premier League Champions; 1994–95, 1995–96 | Succeeded by Last Champions |
| Preceded by Cardiff Devils | Playoff Champions; 1994–95, 1995–96, 1996–97 | Succeeded by Ayr Scottish Eagles |
| Preceded by Nottingham Panthers | Autumn Cup Winners; 1995–96 | Succeeded by Nottingham Panthers |
| Preceded by Ayr Scottish Eagles | Challenge Cup Winners; 1998–99, 1999–00, 2000–01 | Succeeded by Ayr Scottish Eagles |
| Preceded by Bracknell Bees | Superleague Champions; 2000–01 | Succeeded by Belfast Giants |
| Preceded by London Knights | Playoff Champions; 2000–01, 2001–02 | Succeeded by Belfast Giants |
| Preceded by Manchester Storm | Autumn Cup Winners; 2000–01 | Succeeded by Last Champions |
| Preceded by Belfast Giants | Superleague Champions; 2002–03 | Succeeded by Last Champions |
| Preceded by Ayr Scottish Eagles | Challenge Cup Winners; 2002–03 | Succeeded by Nottingham Panthers |
| Preceded by Inaugural Champions | Elite League Champions; 2003–04 | Succeeded by Coventry Blaze |
| Preceded by Belfast Giants | Playoff Champions; 2003–04 | Succeeded by Coventry Blaze |
| Preceded by Inaugural Champions | Knockout Cup Winners; 2005–06 | Succeeded by Cardiff Devils |
| Preceded by Nottingham Panthers | Playoff Champions; 2007–08, 2008–09 | Succeeded by Belfast Giants |
| Preceded by Coventry Blaze | Elite League Champions; 2008–09 | Succeeded by Coventry Blaze |
| Preceded by Coventry Blaze | Elite League Champions; 2010–11 | Succeeded by Belfast Giants |
| Preceded by Nottingham Panthers | Playoff Champions; 2013–14 | Succeeded by Coventry Blaze |
| Preceded by Belfast Giants | Elite League Champions; 2014–15, 2015–16 | Succeeded by Cardiff Devils |
| Preceded by Nottingham Panthers | Playoff Champions; 2016–17 | Succeeded by Cardiff Devils |
| Preceded by Belfast Giants | Challenge Cup Winners; 2019–20 | Succeeded by Belfast Giants |
| Preceded by Belfast Giants | Challenge Cup Winners; 2023–24 | Succeeded by Belfast Giants |
| Preceded by Belfast Giants | Elite League Champions; 2023–24 | Succeeded by Belfast Giants |
| Preceded by Belfast Giants | Playoff Champions; 2023–24 | Succeeded by Nottingham Panthers |
