= 2001–02 ISL season =

- League: Ice Hockey Superleague
- Sport: Ice hockey

League
- Champions: Belfast Giants

Challenge Cup
- Champions: Ayr Scottish Eagles

Playoffs
- Champions: Sheffield Steelers

Seasons
- ← 2000–01 2002–03 →

The 2001–02 Ice Hockey Superleague season was the sixth season of the Ice Hockey Superleague (ISL).

Although the league started the season as the Sekonda Ice Hockey Superleague, Sekonda withdrew their sponsorship of the league in December 2001 and the league reverted to being known simply as the Ice Hockey Superleague. Benson & Hedges also withdrew their sponsorship of the Autumn Cup and the competition ceased to take place.

Cardiff Devils were stripped of their franchise after the club went into voluntary liquidation. Following the Newcastle franchise being taken over by the Eye Group, the Newcastle Jesters players were not paid and the club was eventually stripped of their franchise in October 2001 without having played a game.

There was trouble in Sheffield when the Cooke, Jenkinson and Smith consortium who bailed out the Steelers at the end of the previous season were denied the franchise in favour of the league's preferred bidder, Norton Lea. After the Sheffield Arena refused to award ice time to Norton Lea, preferring to deal with the Cooke, Jenkinson and Smith consortium, the Cooke, Jenkinson and Smith consortium applied for the Sheffield Steelers to play in the second tier British National League. However, this application was refused and the club eventually continued in the ISL under the ownership of Norton Lea.

As a replacement for the fixtures lost from the Newcastle Jesters games, the ISL arranged a new Ryder Cup style tournament between the ISL teams and teams from the Deutsche Eishockey Liga (DEL) to be called the Ahearne Trophy to be played in February 2002.

The Belfast Giants claimed the league championship in only their second season of operations. The playoffs championship was won by the Sheffield Steelers while the Challenge Cup was won by the Ayr Scottish Eagles.

After awarding three points for a win, two points for an overtime win and one point for an overtime loss the previous season, the league discontinued overtime and reverted to awarding two points for a win and one point for a draw.

== Challenge Cup ==
All seven teams in the league competed in the Challenge Cup. The first round was the first home and away meeting of each team in the league with the points counting towards both the Challenge Cup table and the league table. The top four teams progressed to the semi-finals. The semi finals were home and away games with the winner on aggregate progressing to the one off final game.

=== First round ===
| Challenge Cup | GP | W | T | L | GF | GA | Pts |
|---|---|---|---|---|---|---|---|
| Belfast Giants | 12 | 10 | 0 | 2 | 49 | 29 | 20 |
| Nottingham Panthers | 12 | 6 | 4 | 2 | 44 | 35 | 16 |
| Ayr Scottish Eagles | 12 | 5 | 3 | 4 | 34 | 33 | 13 |
| Bracknell Bees | 12 | 5 | 2 | 5 | 40 | 41 | 12 |
| Manchester Storm | 12 | 3 | 2 | 7 | 24 | 37 | 8 |
| London Knights | 12 | 2 | 4 | 6 | 29 | 34 | 8 |
| Sheffield Steelers | 12 | 3 | 1 | 8 | 35 | 46 | 7 |

=== Semi-finals ===
1st place (Belfast) vs 4th place (Bracknell)

- Belfast Giants 5–1 Bracknell Bees
- Bracknell Bees 5–4 Belfast Giants (Belfast win 9–6 on aggregate)

3rd place (Ayr) vs 2nd place (Nottingham)

- Ayr Scottish Eagles 3–0 Nottingham Panthers
- Nottingham Panthers 4–4 Ayr Scottish Eagles (Ayr win 7–4 on aggregate)

=== Final ===
Winner semi final 1 vs Winner semi final 2

- Belfast Giants 0–5 Ayr Scottish Eagles

== Ahearne Trophy ==
| Ahearne Trophy | GP | W | T | L | GF | GA | Pts |
|---|---|---|---|---|---|---|---|
| DEL | 14 | 6 | 4 | 4 | 44 | 42 | 16 |
| ISL | 14 | 4 | 4 | 6 | 42 | 44 | 12 |

== League ==
Each team played four home games and four away games against each of their opponents. All seven teams in the league were entered into the playoffs.

| Superleague | GP | W | T | L | GF | GA | Pts |
|---|---|---|---|---|---|---|---|
| Belfast Giants | 48 | 31 | 8 | 9 | 177 | 119 | 70 |
| Ayr Scottish Eagles | 48 | 20 | 9 | 19 | 136 | 130 | 49 |
| Sheffield Steelers | 48 | 18 | 12 | 18 | 138 | 144 | 48 |
| Nottingham Panthers | 48 | 19 | 9 | 20 | 140 | 141 | 47 |
| Bracknell Bees | 48 | 15 | 13 | 20 | 140 | 158 | 43 |
| London Knights | 48 | 14 | 13 | 21 | 130 | 145 | 41 |
| Manchester Storm | 48 | 13 | 12 | 23 | 117 | 141 | 38 |

== Playoffs ==
All seven teams in the league took part in the playoffs. After an initial round where each team played all the other teams once the top four teams qualified for the finals weekend.

=== Round one ===
| Playoffs | GP | W | T | L | GF | GA | Pts |
|---|---|---|---|---|---|---|---|
| Ayr Scottish Eagles | 6 | 5 | 1 | 0 | 22 | 13 | 11 |
| Sheffield Steelers | 6 | 4 | 1 | 1 | 15 | 8 | 9 |
| London Knights | 6 | 4 | 0 | 2 | 17 | 15 | 8 |
| Manchester Storm | 6 | 2 | 1 | 3 | 24 | 21 | 5 |
| Belfast Giants | 6 | 2 | 1 | 3 | 21 | 19 | 5 |
| Nottingham Panthers | 6 | 1 | 2 | 3 | 13 | 20 | 4 |
| Bracknell Bees | 6 | 0 | 0 | 6 | 10 | 26 | 0 |

=== Semi-finals ===
1st place vs 4th place

- Ayr Scottish Eagles 1-2 Manchester Storm

2nd place vs 3rd place

- Sheffield Steelers 3–2 London Knights

=== Final ===
Winner semi final 1 vs Winner semi final 2

- Manchester Storm 3–4 Sheffield Steelers (after overtime and penalty shootout)

== Scoring leaders ==
The scoring leaders are taken from all league games.

- Most points: 59 Kevin Riehl (Belfast Giants)
- Most goals: 24 Chris Lipsett (Sheffield Steelers)
- Most assists: 37 Kevin Riehl (Belfast Giants)
- Most PIMs: 222 Barry Nieckar (Nottingham Panthers)

== Awards ==
- Coach of the Year Trophy – Dave Whistle, Belfast Giants
- Player of the Year Trophy – Kevin Riehl, Belfast Giants
- Ice Hockey Annual Trophy – Jonathan Weaver, Ayr Scottish Eagles

=== All Star teams ===
| First team | Position | Second Team |
|---|---|---|
| Mike Bales, Belfast Giants | G | Joaquin Gage, Ayr Scottish Eagles |
| Johan Silfwerplatz, Ayr Scottish Eagles | D | Alan Schuler, Ayr Scottish Eagles |
| Rob Stewart, Belfast Giants | D | Maurizio Mansi, London Knights |
| Kevin Riehl, Belfast Giants | F | P. C. Drouin, Nottingham Panthers |
| Sean Berens, Belfast Giants | F | Ed Courtenay, Ayr Scottish Eagles |
| Jason Ruff, Belfast Giants | F | Scott Allison, Sheffield Steelers |
