= Shayne McCosh =

Canadian ice hockey player

- Born: January 27, 1974 (age 52) Oshawa, Ontario, Canada
- Height: 6 ft 1 in (185 cm)
- Weight: 200 lb (91 kg; 14 st 4 lb)
- Position: Defence
- Shot: Left
- Played for: Springfield Falcons; Providence Bruins; Bracknell Bees; Sheffield Steelers; HC Bolzano; Augsburger Panther; EK Zell am See
- Playing career: 1994–2005

Shayne McCosh (born January 27, 1974) is a Canadian retired professional ice hockey defenceman. Between 1994 and 2005 he has played in the American Hockey League (AHL) and the ECHL in North America as well as the British Ice Hockey Superleague (ISL), the Italian Serie A, the German Deutsche Eishockey Liga (DEL) and the Austrian Nationalliga (Austria-2).

== Playing career ==
McCosh was born in Oshawa, Ontario. He played junior ice hockey for the Kitchener Rangers, Windsor Spitfires and Detroit Junior Red Wings between 1990 and 1995. During that time he helped the Red Wings to win their division in the 1993–94 and 1994–95 seasons. He was also a member of the Red Wings' J. Ross Robertson Cup winning team in 1994–95.

McCosh made his senior level debut with the Springfield Falcons in the AHL in 1994–95. The following season, he played for the Erie Panthers in the ECHL and the Providence Bruins in the AHL.

In 1996–97 McCosh joined the Bracknell Bees in the British ISL. He stayed with Bracknell for three seasons before joining the Sheffield Steelers, also of the ISL. He played with Sheffield for two seasons, during which time he helped them to win the Challenge Cup in 1999–00 and a Grand Slam of all available trophies in 2000–01.

In 2001–02 McCosh joined HC Bolzano in the Italian Serie A before joining Augsburger Panther in the DEL for the 2002–03 season. He returned to Bolzano the following season before playing for EK Zell am See in the Austrian second tier Nationalliga in 2004–05 and then retiring from the professional game.

== Awards and honours ==
- Named to the ISL All-Star Second Team in 1997–98 and 1999–00.
- Named to the ISL All-Star First Team in 2000–01.
- Named the Sekonda Face to Watch in March 1999 and January 2001.

== Career statistics ==
			Regular season					Playoffs				
Season	Team	League	GP	G	A	Pts	PIM	GP	G	A	Pts	PIM
1990–91	Kitchener Rangers	OHL	62	3	22	25	26	6	0	1	1	4
1991–92	Kitchener Rangers	OHL	62	7	36	43	46	14	1	2	3	28
1992–93	Kitchener Rangers	OHL	32	7	25	32	43	—	—	—	—	—
1992–93	Windsor Spitfires	OHL	36	5	35	40	38	—	—	—	—	—
1993–94	Windsor Spitfires	OHL	34	3	21	24	46	—	—	—	—	—
1993–94	Detroit Junior Red Wings	OHL	25	3	18	21	33	17	3	8	11	24
1994–95	Springfield Falcons	AHL	18	2	3	5	4	—	—	—	—	—
1994–95	Detroit Junior Red Wings	OHL	26	4	21	25	32	20	7	16	23	12
1995–96	Erie Panthers	ECHL	65	10	27	37	81	—	—	—	—	—
1995–96	Providence Bruins	AHL	8	1	5	6	2	—	—	—	—	—
1996–97	Bracknell Bees	BISL	36	5	17	22	30	6	2	1	3	4
1997–98	Bracknell Bees	BISL	28	7	16	23	10	6	1	6	7	8
1998–99	Bracknell Bees	BISL	41	5	20	25	42	7	2	9	11	2
1999–00	Sheffield Steelers	BISL	41	8	37	45	22	6	2	2	4	2
2000–01	Sheffield Steelers	BISL	44	9	37	46	32	8	0	3	3	4
2001–02	HC Bolzano	ITL	44	12	25	37	24	—	—	—	—	—
2002–03	Augsburger Panther	DEL	51	2	7	9	30	—	—	—	—	—
2003–04	HC Bolzano	ITL	24	8	14	22	16	—	—	—	—	—
2004–05	EK Zell am See	AUT.2	42	19	51	70	93	—	—	—	—	—
AHL totals			26	3	8	11	6	—	—	—	—	—
