= John Lawless (ice hockey) =

Canadian ice hockey player

- Born: January 8, 1961 (age 65) Orillia, Ontario, Canada
- Position: Forward
- Played for: Peterborough Pirates; Oxford City Stars; Cardiff Devils; Manchester Storm; Telford Tigers
- National team: Great Britain
- Playing career: 1983–1999

John Lawless (born January 8, 1961 in Orillia, Ontario) is a retired professional ice hockey player who played in the United Kingdom. Between 1982 and 1999 he played for the Peterborough Pirates, Oxford City Stars, Cardiff Devils, Manchester Storm and Telford Tigers. He also played for the Great Britain national ice hockey team at the 1991 Pool C World Championships. He was inducted to the British Ice Hockey Hall of Fame in 1997. He went on to coach the Huntsville Wildcats Junior A hockey team during the 2000-01 OPJHL season.
