= Aaron Fox (ice hockey) =

American ice hockey player and executive (born 1976)

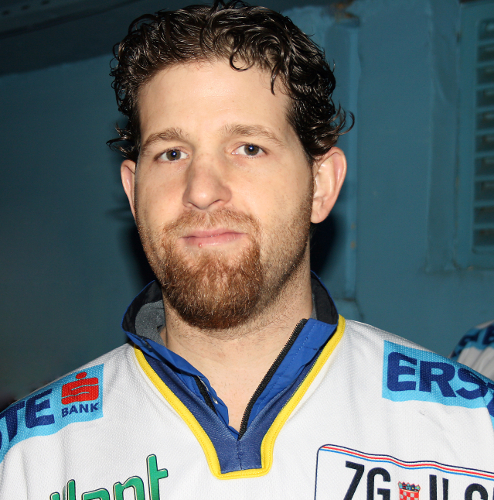
- Born: May 19, 1976 (age 50) Hastings, Minnesota, U.S.
- Position: Center
- Played for: Peoria Rivermen; Richmond Renegades; Vienna Capitals; Milwaukee Admirals; Dornbirn Bulldogs; HC TWK Innsbruck; KHL Medvescak Zagreb II; HKM Zvolen; HKM Zvolen B HC Ambrì-Piotta; SC Riessersee; EHC Freiburg; Straubing Tigers; HK Acroni Jesenice
- Current EIHL coach: Sheffield Steelers
- Coached for: Medvescak Zagreb

Aaron Fox (born May 19, 1976) is an American ice hockey executive and former professional ice hockey player.

== Early life ==
Fox was born in Hastings, Minnesota. He attended Minnesota State University, Mankato from 1996 to 2000. During his senior year, he was the team captain of the Minnesota State Mavericks men's ice hockey team.

== Career ==
Except for short stints with the Milwaukee Admirals of the International Hockey League, and the Peoria Rivermen and Richmond Renegades of the East Coast Hockey League, he spent his professional career abroad, playing in Slovakia, Switzerland, Germany, Austria, Slovenia and Croatia.

While playing for the Vienna Capitals, he led the Austrian Hockey League in scoring in 2007–08. He also displayed his scoring ability at Austrian second-division side EC Dornbirn in 2010–11, when he tallied a league-leading 83 points (30 goals, 53 assists) in 42 games.

=== Managing career ===
In 2013, Fox decided to end to his playing career and signed a three-year deal as sports director of KHL Medveščak Zagreb. The Zagreb team left the KHL at the conclusion of the 2016–17 season to join the Austrian ICE Hockey League. On July 30, 2018, Medveščak announced that Fox would serve as both sports director and coach. Less than nine months later, on April 16, 2019, the Sheffield Steelers of the Elite Ice Hockey League announced Fox as the team's new coach and general manager, having signed him to a three-year contract. Fox became the Steelers most winning coach with a 8-3 win over Manchester Storm, on 23 November 2024.Later that season, Fox would go on to break the most games coached record in Sheffield. In 2023-2024 he won the treble with the Sheffield Steelers
