= Ice Hockey Journalists UK =

UK ice hockey and journalism organization

Ice Hockey Journalists UK, abbreviated to IHJUK, is an organisation which was set up in 1984 to promote the interests of ice hockey and its writers, photographers and broadcasters. Originally called the British Ice Hockey Writers Association, abbreviated to BIHWA, it changed its name in 2006 in order to reflect the change in the sport and the growth of the media covering it.

IHJUK were the custodians of the British Ice Hockey Hall of Fame until 2018. A sub-committee of members of IHJUK selected people who have made an "outstanding contribution" to the sport for induction to the Hall.

IHJUK are also responsible for the awarding of honours to players and coaches at the end of each season. The awards are:

- All Star Teams
- Coach of the Year Trophy
- Player of the Year Trophy
- Ice Hockey Annual Trophy for the leading British points scorer
- British Netminder of the Year
- Alan Weeks Trophy for the best British defenceman
- Best British Forward
- Vic Batchelder Memorial Award for the Young British Player

== See also ==
- EIHL All-Star Team
- ISL All-Star Team
- Professional Hockey Writers' Association (US)
- Football Writers' Association (England)
- Scottish Football Writers' Association
