= 2000–01 ISL season =

2000–01 Ice Hockey Superleague season
- League: Ice Hockey Superleague
- Sport: Ice hockey
- Benson & Hedges Cup: Sheffield Steelers
- League champions: Sheffield Steelers
- Playoffs champions: Sheffield Steelers
- Challenge Cup champions: Sheffield Steelers

Seasons
- ← 1999–2000 2001–02 →

The 2000–01 Ice Hockey Superleague season was the fifth season of the Sekonda Ice Hockey Superleague (ISL).

Belfast Giants, a new team formed in Northern Ireland, were granted a franchise, although they did not take part in the Benson & Hedges Cup. The Newcastle franchise was sold to Harry Harkimo, co-owner of Jokerit who play in the Finnish SM-liiga, and their name was changed to the Newcastle Jesters (Jokerit being Finnish for Jester).

This season, the league awarded three points for a win, two points for an overtime win and one point for an overtime loss in all competitions except the Benson & Hedges Cup. Any game still tied after overtime was decided by a penalty shootout.

The Sheffield Steelers won a Grand Slam of all available competitions. However, the win was marred by the club being found guilty by the league for breaking the £450,000 wage cap and going into liquidation at the end of the season.

== Benson & Hedges Cup ==
The 2000 Benson & Hedges Cup consisted of the teams from the ISL, minus the Belfast Giants, and the teams from the British National League (BNL). The ISL teams were split into two groups of four teams (groups A and B) and the BNL teams were split into two groups, one of four teams (group C) and one of five teams (group D). Each team played the other teams in the group once at home and away.

The group winners from the BNL groups entered the knock-out stage in a challenge round with the fourth placed teams from the ISL group stage. The winners of the challenge rounds entered the quarter-finals with the top three teams from each ISL group.

All games after the group stages were home and away aggregate scores except for the challenge round and the final itself which were one-off games. The final was held at Sheffield Arena.

=== First round ===
Challenge round	Quarter-finals

==== Group A ====
Group A	GP	W	T	L	GF	GA	Pts
Ayr Scottish Eagles	6	4	0	2	23	18	8
Manchester Storm	6	3	2	1	26	24	8
Cardiff Devils	6	1	3	2	23	25	5
Bracknell Bees	6	0	3	3	22	27	3

==== Group B ====
Group B	GP	W	T	L	GF	GA	Pts
Sheffield Steelers	6	5	0	1	23	11	10
London Knights	6	3	0	3	13	11	6
Nottingham Panthers	6	3	0	3	11	17	6
Newcastle Jesters	6	1	0	5	13	21	2

==== Group C ====
Group C	GP	W	T	L	GF	GA	Pts
Fife Flyers	6	4	1	1	32	17	9
Hull Thunder	6	4	0	2	29	20	8
Peterborough Pirates	6	2	1	3	24	27	5
Paisley Pirates	6	1	0	5	17	38	2

==== Group D ====
Group D	GP	W	T	L	GF	GA	Pts
Guildford Flames	8	6	1	1	34	15	13
Basingstoke Bison	8	5	1	2	30	21	11
Coventry Blaze	8	4	2	2	35	26	10
Slough Jets	8	1	2	5	23	44	4
Milton Keynes Kings	8	1	0	7	28	44	2

=== Challenge round ===
Winner Group C (Fife) vs 4th place Group B (Newcastle)

- Fife Flyers 1–8 Newcastle Jesters

Winner Group D (Guildford) vs 4th place Group A (Bracknell)

- Guildford Flames 1–9 Bracknell Bees

=== Finals ===
==== Quarter-finals ====
3rd place Group B (Nottingham) vs 2nd place Group A (Manchester)

- Nottingham Panthers 3–2 Manchester Storm
- Manchester Storm 2–4 Nottingham Panthers (Nottingham win 7–4 on aggregate)

Winner challenge game 2 (Bracknell) vs Winner Group B (Sheffield)

- Bracknell Bees 3–4 Sheffield Steelers
- Sheffield Steelers 3–2 Bracknell Bees (Sheffield win 7–5 on aggregate)

3rd place Group A (Cardiff) vs 2nd place Group B (London)

- Cardiff Devils 2–3 London Knights
- London Knights 5–1 Cardiff Devils (London win 8–3 on aggregate)

Winner challenge game 1 (Newcastle) vs Winner Group A (Ayr)

- Newcastle Jesters 3–2 Ayr Scottish Eagles
- Ayr Scottish Eagles 2–2 Newcastle Jesters (Newcastle win 5–4 on aggregate)

==== Semi-finals ====
Winner semi final 2 (Sheffield) vs Winner semi final 1 (Nottingham)

- Sheffield Steelers 2–1 Nottingham Panthers
- Nottingham Panthers 4–5 Sheffield Steelers (Sheffield win 7–5 on aggregate)

Winner semi final 4 (Newcastle) vs Winner semi final 3 (London)

- Newcastle Jesters 3–2 London Knights
- London Knights 1–2 Newcastle Jesters (Newcastle win 5–3 on aggregate)

==== Final ====
The final took place at Sheffield Arena between Sheffield Steelers and Newcastle Jesters.

- Sheffield Steelers 4–0 Newcastle Jesters

== Challenge Cup ==
All nine teams in the league competed in the Challenge Cup. The first round was the first home and away meeting of each team in the league with the points counting towards both the Challenge Cup table and the league table. The top four teams progressed to the semi-finals. The semi finals were home and away games with the winner on aggregate progressing to the one off final game.

Sheffield Steelers won the competition for the third time in a row.

=== First round ===
Challenge Cup	GP	W	OTW	OTL	L	GF	GA	Pts
Belfast Giants	16	9	1	2	4	58	49	31
London Knights	16	8	2	2	4	52	39	30
Ayr Scottish Eagles	16	8	2	0	6	63	51	28
Sheffield Steelers	16	7	3	1	5	45	39	28
Bracknell Bees	16	6	3	2	5	64	50	26
Manchester Storm	16	6	2	1	7	59	71	23
Newcastle Jesters	16	4	2	5	5	48	49	21
Cardiff Devils	16	5	1	3	7	45	51	20
Nottingham Panthers	16	0	3	3	10	33	68	9

=== Semi-finals ===
1st place (Belfast) vs 4th place (Sheffield)

- Belfast Giants 2–1 Sheffield Steelers
- Sheffield Steelers 7–0 Belfast Giants (Sheffield win 8–2 on aggregate)

3rd place (Ayr) vs 2nd place (London)

- Ayr Scottish Eagles 5–5 London Knights
- London Knights 2–3 Ayr Scottish Eagles (Ayr win 8–7 on aggregate)

=== Final ===
Winner semi final 1 vs Winner semi final 2

- Sheffield Steelers 4–2 Ayr Scottish Eagles

== League ==
Each team played three home games and three away games against each of their opponents. The top eight teams in the league were entered into the playoffs.

Superleague	GP	W	OTW	OTL	L	GF	GA	Pts
Sheffield Steelers	48	30	5	4	9	162	115	104
Cardiff Devils	48	24	5	3	16	167	130	85
Bracknell Bees	48	19	6	6	17	173	161	75
London Knights	48	18	7	6	17	143	130	74
Ayr Scottish Eagles	48	21	4	1	22	161	158	72
Belfast Giants	48	17	6	9	16	158	159	72
Manchester Storm	48	15	6	3	24	148	186	60
Nottingham Panthers	48	10	8	7	23	126	167	53
Newcastle Jesters	48	12	3	11	22	126	158	53

== Playoffs ==
The top eight teams in the league took part in the playoffs. Group A consisted of Belfast, London, Nottingham and Sheffield while Group B consisted of Ayr, Bracknell, Cardiff and Manchester. The top two teams from each playoff group qualified for the finals weekend. The third place playoff was dropped for this season.

=== Group A ===
Group A	GP	W	OTW	OTL	L	GF	GA	Pts
London Knights	6	4	0	0	2	17	11	12
Sheffield Steelers	6	4	0	0	2	16	18	12
Belfast Giants	6	3	0	0	3	17	17	9
Nottingham Panthers	6	1	0	0	5	13	17	3

=== Group B ===
Group B	GP	W	OTW	OTL	L	GF	GA	Pts
Bracknell Bees	6	3	1	0	2	20	17	11
Ayr Scottish Eagles	6	2	1	1	2	23	19	9
Cardiff Devils	6	2	1	1	2	23	24	9
Manchester Storm	6	1	1	2	2	20	26	7

=== Semi-finals ===
Winner Group A vs 2nd place Group B

- London Knights 4-1 Ayr Scottish Eagles

Winner Group B vs 2nd place Group A

- Bracknell Bees 2–4 Sheffield Steelers

=== Final ===
Winner semi final 1 vs Winner semi final 2

- London Knights 1-2 Sheffield Steelers

== Awards ==
- Coach of the Year Trophy – Mike Blaisdell, Sheffield Steelers
- Player of the Year Trophy – David Longstaff, Sheffield Steelers
- Ice Hockey Annual Trophy – Tony Hand, Ayr Scottish Eagles
- British Netminder of the Year – Stevie Lyle, Cardiff Devils

=== All Star teams ===
First team	Position	Second Team
Trevor Robins, London Knights	G	Mike Torchia, Sheffield Steelers
Shayne McCosh, Sheffield Steelers	D	Neal Martin, London Knights
Jim Paek, Nottingham Panthers	D	Adam Smith, Sheffield Steelers
David Longstaff, Sheffield Steelers	F	Greg Bullock, Manchester Storm
P. C. Drouin, Nottingham Panthers	F	Steve Thornton, Cardiff Devils
Tony Hand, Ayr Scottish Eagles	F	Kory Karlander, Belfast Giants

== Scoring leaders ==
The scoring leaders are taken from all league games.

- Most points: 60 Greg Bullock (Manchester Storm)
- Most goals: 27 Greg Bullock (Manchester Storm)
- Most assists: 37 Shayne McCosh (Sheffield Steelers) and Steve Thornton (Cardiff Devils)
- Most PIMs: 260 Claude Jutras (London Knights)
