= 1999–2000 ISL season =

1999–2000 Ice Hockey Superleague season
- League: Ice Hockey Superleague
- Sport: Ice hockey
- Benson & Hedges Cup: Manchester Storm
- League champions: Bracknell Bees
- Playoffs champions: London Knights
- Challenge Cup champions: Sheffield Steelers

Seasons
- 1998–99 2000–01

The 1999–2000 Ice Hockey Superleague season was the fourth season of the Sekonda Ice Hockey Superleague (ISL).

There were no changes in the teams from the 1998–99 season. However the league introduced a wage cap of £500,000 for this season.

== Benson & Hedges Cup ==
The 1999 Benson & Hedges Cup consisted of the teams from the ISL and the teams from the British National League (BNL). The BNL teams were split into three groups of four teams (groups A, B and C) and the ISL teams were split into two groups of four teams (groups D and E). Each team played the other teams in the group once at home and away.

The group winners from the BNL groups and the best runner-up entered the knock-out stage in a preliminary challenge round qualifier with the winners progressing to the challenge round to meet the fourth placed teams from the ISL group stage. The winners of the challenge rounds entered the quarter-finals with the top three teams from each ISL group.

All games after the group stages were home and away aggregate scores except for the challenge round and the final itself which were one-off games. The final was held at Sheffield Arena.

=== First round ===
Challenge round qualifier	Challenge round	Quarter-finals

==== Group A ====
Group A	GP	W	T	L	GF	GA	Pts
Fife Flyers	6	5	1	0	49	11	11
Edinburgh Capitals	6	4	1	1	31	19	9
Paisley Pirates	6	2	0	4	21	33	4
Whitley Bay Warriors	6	0	0	6	12	50	0

==== Group B ====
Group B	GP	W	T	L	GF	GA	Pts
Hull Thunder	6	4	2	0	31	16	10
Peterborough Pirates	6	4	2	0	40	17	10
Milton Keynes Kings	6	2	0	4	16	24	4
Telford Tigers	6	0	0	6	11	41	0

==== Group C ====
Group C	GP	W	T	L	GF	GA	Pts
Basingstoke Bison	6	3	2	1	23	12	8
Slough Jets	6	2	3	1	17	13	7
Guildford Flames	6	2	2	2	21	17	6
Solihull Blaze	6	1	1	4	23	42	3

==== Group D ====
Group D	GP	W	T	L	GF	GA	Pts
Cardiff Devils	6	2	2	2	18	14	6
Bracknell Bees	6	2	2	2	27	26	6
London Knights	6	2	2	2	18	18	6
Sheffield Steelers	6	2	2	2	17	22	6

==== Group E ====
Group E	GP	W	T	L	GF	GA	Pts
Manchester Storm	6	5	0	1	29	15	10
Ayr Scottish Eagles	6	4	0	2	24	16	8
Newcastle Riverkings	6	2	0	4	14	26	4
Nottingham Panthers	6	1	0	5	14	24	2

=== Second round ===
==== Challenge round qualifiers ====
Peterborough Pirates vs Fife Flyers

- Peterborough Pirates 2–1 Fife Flyers
- Fife Flyers 3–4 Peterborough Pirates (Peterborough win 6–4 on aggregate)

Basingstoke Bison vs Hull Thunder

- Basingstoke Bison 3–2 Hull Thunder
- Hull Thunder 1–3 Basingstoke Bison (Basingstoke win 6–3 on aggregate)

==== Challenge round ====
- Peterborough Pirates 3–5 Nottingham Panthers
- Basingstoke Bison 1–4 Sheffield Steelers

=== Finals ===
==== Quarter-finals ====
Nottingham Panthers vs Cardiff Devils

- Nottingham Panthers 1–6 Cardiff Devils
- Cardiff Devils 7–1 Nottingham Panthers (Cardiff win 13–2 on aggregate)

Manchester Storm vs Sheffield Steelers

- Manchester Storm 6–6 Sheffield Steelers
- Sheffield Steelers 2–3 Manchester Storm (Manchester win 9–8 on aggregate)

Newcastle Riverkings vs Bracknell Bees

- Newcastle Riverkings 5–8 Bracknell Bees
- Bracknell Bees 7–4 Newcastle Riverkings (Bracknell win 15–9 on aggregate)

London Knights vs Ayr Scottish Eagles

- London Knights 1–0 Ayr Scottish Eagles
- Ayr Scottish Eagles 0–7 London Knights (London win 7–1 on aggregate)

==== Semi-finals ====
Manchester Storm vs Cardiff Devils

- Manchester Storm 4–0 Cardiff Devils
- Cardiff Devils 0–0 Manchester Storm (Manchester win 4–0 on aggregate)

Bracknell Bees vs London Knights

- Bracknell Bees 3–5 London Knights
- London Knights 5–3 Bracknell Bees (London win 10–6 on aggregate)

==== Final ====
The final took place at Sheffield Arena between Manchester Storm and London Knights.

- Manchester Storm 4–3 London Knights (after overtime and penalty shootout)

== Challenge Cup ==
All eight teams in the league competed in the Challenge Cup. The first round was the first home and away meeting of each team in the league with the points counting towards both the Challenge Cup table and the league table. The top four teams progressed to the semi-finals. The semi finals were home and away games with the winner on aggregate progressing to the one off final game.

In a repeat of the previous season's Challenge Cup final, Sheffield Steelers took on the Nottingham Panthers and won the competition.

=== First round ===
Challenge Cup	GP	W	T	OTL	L	GF	GA	PTS
London Knights	14	10	0	0	4	35	34	20
Bracknell Bees	14	7	1	4	2	57	48	19
Sheffield Steelers	14	8	0	2	4	77	56	18
Nottingham Panthers	14	8	0	0	6	55	61	16
Ayr Scottish Eagles	14	6	2	1	5	50	43	15
Manchester Storm	14	6	2	1	5	55	52	15
Cardiff Devils	14	6	1	1	6	48	47	14
Newcastle Riverkings	14	2	0	1	11	28	64	5

=== Semi-finals ===
2nd place (Cardiff) vs 3rd place (Sheffield)

- Sheffield Steelers 1–2 Bracknell Bees
- Bracknell Bees 4–8 Sheffield Steelers (Sheffield win 9–6 on aggregate)

1st place (London) vs 4th place (Nottingham)

- London Knights 1–4 Nottingham Panthers
- Nottingham Panthers 3–3 London Knights (Nottingham win 7–4 on aggregate)

=== Final ===
Winner A vs Winner B

- Sheffield Steelers 2–1 Nottingham Panthers

== League ==
Each team played three home games and three away games against each of their opponents. All eight teams were entered into the playoffs.

Superleague	GP	W	T	OTL	L	GF	GA	Pts
Bracknell Bees	42	24	3	5	10	181	138	56
Sheffield Steelers	42	24	2	2	14	188	155	52
Manchester Storm	42	23	2	3	14	155	138	51
London Knights	42	23	3	1	15	135	125	50
Ayr Scottish Eagles	42	17	5	4	16	144	147	43
Nottingham Panthers	42	18	3	1	20	140	165	40
Cardiff Devils	42	17	4	2	19	138	149	40
Newcastle Riverkings	42	11	0	2	29	113	177	24

== Playoffs ==
All eight teams in the league took part in the playoffs. Group A consisted of Bracknell, London, Newcastle and Nottingham while Group B consisted of Ayr, Cardiff, Manchester and Sheffield. The top two teams from each playoff group qualified for the finals weekend. The third place playoff was dropped for this season.

=== Group A ===
Group A	GP	W	T	OTL	L	GF	GA	Pts
London Knights	6	5	0	0	1	28	14	10
Newcastle Riverkings	6	3	1	2	0	14	12	9
Bracknell Bees	6	3	1	0	2	22	19	7
Nottingham Panthers	6	0	0	1	5	7	26	1

=== Group B ===
Group B	GP	W	T	OTL	L	GF	GA	Pts
Sheffield Steelers	6	4	2	0	0	26	14	10
Ayr Scottish Eagles	6	2	1	1	2	12	19	6
Cardiff Devils	6	2	1	0	3	15	16	5
Manchester Storm	6	1	2	1	2	12	16	5

=== Semi-finals ===
Winner B vs Runner-Up A

- Sheffield Steelers 1-3 Newcastle Riverkings

Winner A vs Runner-Up B

- London Knights 2–1 Ayr Scottish Eagles (after overtime)

=== Final ===
Winner B vs Winner A

- London Knights 7-3 Newcastle Riverkings

== Awards ==
- Coach of the Year Trophy – Dave Whistle, Bracknell Bees
- Player of the Year Trophy – Ed Courtenay, Sheffield Steelers
- Ice Hockey Annual Trophy – Tony Hand, Ayr Scottish Eagles
- British Netminder of the Year – Stevie Lyle, Cardiff Devils
- Alan Weeks Trophy – Stephen Cooper, Nottingham Panthers

=== All Star teams ===
First team	Position	Second Team
Geoff Sarjeant, Ayr Scottish Eagles	G	Brian Greer, Bracknell Bees
Claudio Scremin, London Knights	D	Shayne McCosh, Sheffield Steelers
Rob Stewart, Bracknell Bees	D	Neil Martin, London Knights
Ed Courtenay, Sheffield Steelers	F	Teeder Wynne, Sheffield Steelers
Kevin Riehl, Bracknell Bees	F	Mikko Koivunoro, Newcastle Riverkings
Rob Kenny, London Knights	F	Steve Thornton, Cardiff Devils

== Scoring leaders ==
The scoring leaders are taken from all league games.

- Most points: 70 Ed Courtenay (Sheffield Steelers)
- Most goals: 32 Ed Courtenay (Sheffield Steelers)
- Most assists: 39 Mikko Koivunoro (Newcastle Riverkings)
- Most PIMs: 172 Clayton Norris (Newcastle Riverkings)
