= Ice Hockey Annual Trophy =

UK sporting award

The Ice Hockey Annual Trophy is an ice hockey trophy in the United Kingdom which is awarded to the British player who has scored the most points during the season in league competition only.

The award is named after the Ice Hockey Annual, an annual publication which is edited by the current chairman of Ice Hockey Journalists UK, Stewart Robinson.

== Past winners ==
Season	Winner	Team
2008–09	Colin Shields	Belfast Giants
2007–08	Tony Hand	Manchester Phoenix
2006–07	Tony Hand	Manchester Phoenix
2005–06	Tony Hand	Edinburgh Capitals
2004–05	Tony Hand	Belfast Giants
2003–04	Not awarded	
2002–03	Not awarded	
2001–02	Jonathan Weaver	Ayr Scottish Eagles
2000–01	Tony Hand	Ayr Scottish Eagles
1999–00	Tony Hand	Ayr Scottish Eagles
1998–99	Tony Hand	Sheffield Steelers
