= Manchester Storm (1995–2002) =

- City: Manchester, England
- League: Ice Hockey Superleague
- Founded: 1995
- Home arena: Manchester Evening News Arena
- Colours: White, Purple & Black

Franchise history
- 1995–2002: Manchester Storm

The Manchester Storm were an ice hockey team from Manchester, England. The team formed in 1995 by Ogden Entertainment and arena/team Managing Director Lee Esckilsen. The Storm played their home games at the then newly built NYNEX Arena, but they folded during the 2002–03 season.

== Early success ==
Manchester Storm's away jersey from the inaugural 1995–96 season.

Storm won the British Hockey League Division One in their first season, watched by an average crowd of 6,342. Success in the end of season promotion/relegation play-offs followed, resulting in Storm being promoted to the Premier Division of the British Hockey League. However, Britain's league structure was changed in 1996, with the formation of the Ice Hockey Superleague, of which the Manchester team were a founder member. This was alongside Ayr Scottish Eagles, Basingstoke Bison, Bracknell Bees, Cardiff Devils, Newcastle Riverkings, Nottingham Panthers and Sheffield Steelers. The highs of the inaugural season weren't matched in season 2 though, and Storm finished a disappointing seventh in the league. This led to the sacking of coach John Lawless.

American Kurt Kleinendorst was brought in for the 1997–98 season and he completely changed the face of the playing staff. There were 12 new faces on the 19 strong roster when the season started and they went on to make history for a British club in the European Hockey League. As well as holding Dynamo Moscow to a regulation time draw (losing 2–3 in overtime), they beat Sparta Prague home and away – winning 7–0 at home and 4–3 in the Czech capital.

Storm hold the record for the largest ice hockey attendance at a UK league game, set on 23 February 1997, when 17,245 people watched a match against Sheffield Steelers. At the time, this was also a European record. The record for the largest attendance at any ice hockey game in the UK is 17,551 at The O2 arena (London) on 30 September 2007 for an NHL game between the Los Angeles Kings and the Anaheim Ducks.

== The end of an era ==
Manchester Storm folded in 2002 during the 2002–03 season when the costs of running the team out of the Manchester Arena, and at the top level of British hockey, could not be supported by ticket revenue and sponsorship. The then owners SMG who also ran the arena sold the team to Manchester businessman Gary Cowan in full knowledge they did not want ice hockey in the arena then following Sky TVs pulling out of its contract to show live games this meant sponsors pulled out, with no live games and no sponsors and an Arena who didn't want ice hockey in the building the owners had no option other than to put the team into receivership. Later on during the same season Ayr Scottish Eagles also folded.

A supporters group was formed following the collapse of Manchester Storm and launched a new team called the Manchester Phoenix the following season.

== Return of the Storm ==
In June 2015, following the departure of the Manchester Phoenix from the Altrincham Ice Dome due to a dispute with the current owners, it was announced a new team would be based at the rink using the Manchester Storm name. The newly formed Storm would replace the folded Hull Stingrays in the EIHL from the start of the 2015–16 season.

== Past managers/head coaches ==
- Lee Esckilsen, Managing Director, 1995
- John Lawless 1995–97
- Kurt Kleinendorst 1997–2000
- Terry Christensen 2000–01
- Daryl Lipsey 2001–02
- Rob Wilson 2001–02 (assistant)

== Honours ==
- Superleague Winners 1998–99
- Benson and Hedges Cup Winners (former Autumn Cup) 1999–2000
- First Team All-Stars
  - 1997–98 Kris Miller, Craig Woodcroft
  - 1998–99 Frank Pietrangelo, Troy Neumeier
- Second Team All-Stars
  - 1998–99 Kris Miller, Jeff Tomlinson, Jeff Jablonski
  - 2000–01 Greg Bullock

== Two Team Players ==
Players who have featured for both the Manchester Phoenix and the Manchester Storm in league fixtures;

- #5 (United Kingdom) Russ Richardson
- #9 (United States) Mark Bultje
- #15 (Canada) Mike Morin
- #17 (United States) Dwight Parrish
- #18 (United Kingdom) Alan Hough
- #21 (Canada) Jeff Sebastian
- #91 (Canada) Nick Poole
- #93 (United Kingdom) Rick Brebant

== Footnotes ==
| Preceded by Ayr Scottish Eagles | Superleague Champions; 1998–99 | Succeeded by Bracknell Bees |
| Preceded by Nottingham Panthers | Autumn Cup Winners; 1999–00 | Succeeded by Sheffield Steelers |
