= Ice Hockey Superleague =

Former professional ice hockey league in the United Kingdom

- Countries: United Kingdom
- Federation: IIHF
- Founded: November 1995
- First season: 1996–97
- Folded: 2002–03
- No. of teams: 9 (peak figure)
- Feeder league: British National League
- Championship: Superleague trophy
- Associated titles: British Championship; Express Cup; Benson & Hedges Cup
- Recent champions: Sheffield Steelers (2002–03)
- Most successful club: Sheffield Steelers; 2 times winners
- Website: web.archive.org/web/20031012022647/http://www.iceweb.co.uk/

The British Ice Hockey Superleague (BISL, also known as the Sekonda Ice Hockey Superleague from 1998 to 1999 for sponsorship reasons) was a professional ice hockey league in the United Kingdom between 1996 and 2003. Devised in 1995, it replaced the premier division of the British Hockey League at the end of 1995–1996 season; following the major reshuffle of the league and the split between the first and second tier divisions; with the British National League becoming the new second tier division. It was disbanded after the 2002–03 season and replaced by the Elite Ice Hockey League. Unlike its North American counterparts, the Superleague was not divided into conferences; teams competed in a single division.

== History ==
The Ice Hockey Superleague Ltd was established on 1 November 1995 and held its first season in 1996–97 with eight founding clubs – Ayr Scottish Eagles, Basingstoke Bison, Bracknell Bees, Cardiff Devils, Manchester Storm, Newcastle Cobras, Nottingham Panthers, and Sheffield Steelers.

=== Overview ===
Several competitions fell under the jurisdiction of the Superleague. The Superleague ran a total of four competitions: the League, the Play-offs, the Express Cup and the Benson and Hedges Cup. The league consisted of a single division, each team playing three home games and three away games against the other teams in the league. Two points were awarded for a win and one point for an overtime defeat. Overtime consisted of 10 minutes of sudden death. The team that had most points after all fixtures were completed were declared Superleague champions.

After the regular season was complete, the teams would be entered into the play-offs, the winner of which won the British Championship. The teams were entered into two groups, Group A and Group B, each team playing three home games and three away games against the other teams in the group. Two points were awarded for a win and one point for an overtime defeat. Overtime consisted of 10 minutes of sudden death. The top two teams in each group qualified for the semi-finals, which were straight knockout matches. Both the semi-finals and final took place over the course of a weekend.

The Superleague was governed by a board of directors who were the owners of the participating teams with Martin Weddell as chairman. The chief executive Ian Taylor from 1996 to 1902 was replaced by the league's former secretary, Brian Storey in what would be the league's final season of 2003. A system of promotion and relegation was not operated by the Superleague; teams entered the league on the basis of a decision by the board of directors, however the British National league was regarded as the league below the level of the Superleague.

=== Trophy ===
The trophy that was awarded to the winners of the superleague, was called the Ice hockey superleague trophy. It was a silver replica of a George III Monteith Bowl. In the inaugural season, the trophy was taken around the arenas of the superleague teams and publicly displayed on the following dates:

- 21 September 1996 – Bracknell
- 22 September 1996 – Cardiff
- 1 October 1996 – Nottingham
- 5 October 1996 – Sheffield
- 10 October 1996 – Newcastle
- 10 November 1996 – Ayr
- 17 November 1996 – Manchester
- 23 November 1996 – Basingstoke

The trophy itself resembled a Monteith bowl used to cool wine (or punch) glasses that are suspended by their feet through the scallop-edged rim of the bowl. The bowl itself was made of silver, was 14 inches in diameter and 12 inches tall with a mahogany plinth.

Locations of the Superleague teams

=== Sekonda sponsorship ===
In 1998, the Superleague secured a major sponsorship deal with Sekonda. Sekonda remained the title sponsor until 2002, during which time the league was known as the Sekonda Ice Hockey Superleague. During this time, the man of the match awards were presented with a Sekonda watch.

Each month one of the man of the match winners would be selected as the Sekonda Face to Watch. At the end of each season the Sekonda Superleague Player of the Year would be selected from the Sekonda Face to Watch winners by a panel of journalists — except for the season 2001-02 when Sekonda's sponsorship finished part way through the season.

Year	October	November	December	January	February	March
1998-99	Greg Hadden	Kip Noble	**Frank Pietrangelo**	Paul Adey	Grant Sjerven	Shayne McCosh
1999-00	**Ed Courtenay**	Mark Cavallin	Tony Hand	Steve Thornton	Rob Stewart	Jimmy Hibbert
2000-01	Trevor Robins	Tony Hand	Stevie Lyle	Shayne McCosh	**David Longstaff**	Joe Cardarelli
2001-02	Mark Cadotte	Colin Ward	Scott Allison	—	—	—

(names in bold won the Sekonda Superleague Player of the Year award)

=== Collapse ===
Cardiff Devils and Newcastle Jesters pulled out of the league in 2001, reducing the membership of the Superleague to seven clubs. Then, Manchester Storm and Scottish Eagles both folded within a week of one another during the early stages of the 2002–03 season, leaving just five teams remaining. To make matters worse, in December 2002 Bracknell Bees announced their intention to resign from the league to join the BNL at the end of the season, and uncertainty arose surrounding the future of London Knights and their London Arena home at this time; which ultimately led to the Knights folding in 2003. Owing a large debt to Ice Hockey UK and facing the prospect of having only three member clubs, the Superleague placed itself into liquidation on 30 April 2003.

=== Elite Ice Hockey League ===
The Elite Ice Hockey League was formed by the remaining three clubs (Belfast Giants, Nottingham Panthers, and Sheffield Steelers) and played their first season on 12 September 2003. The Elite league is seen as the successor league to the Ice Hockey Superleague.

== Participating clubs ==
The superleague was formed with eight founding clubs, with nine participating at any one time at its peak. Ten clubs have played in the Superleague.

Club	Founded	City	Arena(s)	Capacity	Years in BISL
(Scotland) Ayr Scottish Eagles^{*}	1996	Ayr; Ayrshire	Centrum Arena; Braehead Arena	2,733; 4,000	1996–2003^{†}
(England) Basingstoke Bison^{*}	1988	Basingstoke	Planet Ice Silverdome	2,000	1996–1998
(Northern Ireland) Belfast Giants	2000	Belfast	SSE Arena Belfast	8,300	2000–2003
(England) Bracknell Bees^{*}	1987	Bracknell	John Nike Leisuresport Complex	2,400	1996–2003
(Wales) Cardiff Devils^{*}	1986	Cardiff	Wales National Ice Rink	2,500	1996–2001
(England) London Knights	1998	London	London Arena	12,500	1998–2003
(England) Manchester Storm^{*}	1995	Manchester	Manchester Arena	17,245	1996–2002^{†}
(England) Newcastle Jesters^{*}	1996	Newcastle upon Tyne	Utilita Arena Newcastle	4,500	1996–2001
(England) Nottingham Panthers^{*}	1946	Nottingham	National Ice Centre	10,000	1996–2003
(England) Sheffield Steelers^{*}	1991	Sheffield	Utilita Arena Sheffield	8,500	1996–2003

^{*} Denotes founding member
† Club folded in the 2002–03 season.

== Champions ==
Season	League		Play-Offs		Challenge Cup		Benson & Hedges Cup	
Season	Champions	Runners-up	Champions	Runners-up	Winners	Runners-up	Winners	Runners-up
1996-97	Cardiff Devils	Sheffield Steelers	Sheffield Steelers	Nottingham Panthers	—	—	Nottingham Panthers	Ayr Scottish Eagles
1997-98	Ayr Scottish Eagles	Manchester Storm	Ayr Scottish Eagles	Cardiff Devils	Ayr Scottish Eagles	Bracknell Bees	Ayr Scottish Eagles	Cardiff Devils
1998-99	Manchester Storm	Cardiff Devils	Cardiff Devils	Nottingham Panthers	Sheffield Steelers	Nottingham Panthers	Nottingham Panthers	Ayr Scottish Eagles
1999-00	Bracknell Bees	Sheffield Steelers	London Knights	Newcastle Jesters	Sheffield Steelers	Nottingham Panthers	Manchester Storm	London Knights
2000-01	Sheffield Steelers	Cardiff Devils	Sheffield Steelers	London Knights	Sheffield Steelers	Ayr Scottish Eagles	Sheffield Steelers	Newcastle Jesters
2001-02	Belfast Giants	Ayr Scottish Eagles	Sheffield Steelers	Manchester Storm	Ayr Scottish Eagles	Belfast Giants	—	—
2002-03	Sheffield Steelers	Belfast Giants	Belfast Giants	London Knights	Sheffield Steelers	Nottingham Panthers	—	—

== Criticism ==
There were two main areas of criticism of the Superleague. It was widely regarded that the league was too reliant on imported players, illustrated by the participation of only four British trained players in the 2003 season. The financial situation of the league was unsustainable partly due to a high salary cap at £400k. Smaller teams such as Bracknell couldn't compete with the larger arena teams who had higher revenues.

== See also ==
- British ice hockey league champions
