= List of members of the British Ice Hockey Hall of Fame =

This is a list of all the members of the British Ice Hockey Hall of Fame.

== A ==
- Paul Adey (2006)
- J. F. "Bunny" Ahearne (1986)
- Les Anning (1999)
- Alex Archer (1993)

== B ==
- Vic Batchelder (2000)
- Lou Bates (1950)
- George Beach (1989)
- Joe Beaton (1950)
- Mike Blaisdell (2004)
- Bill Booth (1989)
- Jimmy Borland (1993)
- Rick Brebant (2004)
- Edgar "Chirp" Brenchley (1993)
- Alastair Brennan (1990)
- Billy Brennan (2004)

== C ==
- Keith "Duke" Campbell (1948)
- Earl Carlson (1998)
- Johnny Carlyle (1988)
- Jimmy Chappell (1993)
- Arthur Child (1993)
- Willie Clark (1993)
- David Clarke (2019)
- Joanne Collins (2008)
- Kevin Conway (2005)
- Ian Cooper (2002)
- Stephen Cooper (2003)
- Johnny Coward (1993)
- Tim Cranston (2010)
- Micky Curry (1994)

== D ==
- Gordon Dailley (1993)
- Norman de Mesquita (2002)
- Alex Dampier (1995)
- Gerry Davey (1949)
- Frank Dempster (1992)
- Ernie Domenico (2022)
- Phil Drackett (2007)
- Jack Dryburgh (1991)

== E ==
- Sir Arther Elvin MBE (1990)
- Carl Erhardt (1950)

== F ==
- Ian Forbes (2009)
- Jimmy Foster (1950)

== G ==
- R. G. "Bobby" Giddens (1986)
- Jim Gillespie (2013)
- Bill Glennie (1951)
- Alec Goldstone (1992)

== H ==
- Roy Halpin (1986)
- Tony Hand (2016)
- Moray Hanson (2013)
- Martin C Harris (2022)
- William A. Harris (2023)
- Art Hodgins (1989)
- Shannon Hope (1999)
- Charlie Huddlestone (2018)
- Gib Hutchinson (1951)

== I ==
- Thomas "Red" Imrie (1987)

== J ==
- Peter "Jonker" Johnson (1989)

== K ==
- Chris Kelland (2002)
- T. M. "Doc" Kellough (1950)
- Willie Kerr Snr. (1990)
- Keith Kewley (2005)
- Marshall Key (2007)
- Jack Kilpatrick (1993)
- Charlie Knott Jr. (2004)

== L ==
- Gordon Latto (1999)
- Tommy Lauder (1951)
- John Lawless (1997)
- Ernie Leacock (1987)
- Benny Lee (1995)
- Bobby Lee (1949)
- David Longstaff (2022)
- Lawrence Lovell (1992)
- Les Lovell (2011)
- Stevie Lyle (2018)
- Jim Lynch (2001)

== M ==
- Neal Martin (2011)
- Pat Marsh (1988)
- Terry Matthews (1987)
- Jackson McBride (2008)
- Joe McIntosh (2012)
- George McNeil (1956)
- Freddie Meredith (2003)
- Alfie Miller (1989)
- Wally "Pop" Monson (1955)
- Steve Moria (2016)
- John Murray (1996)

== N ==
- Scott Neil (2007)
- Percy Nicklin (1988)

== O ==
- Mike O'Brien (2009)
- Johnny Oxley (2008)

== P ==
- B. M. "Peter" Patton (1950)
- Annette and Allan Petrie (2005)
- Bert Peer (1955)
- Gordon Poirier (1948)
- Dwight "the Chief" Parrish (2004)

== R ==
- Derek Reilly (1987)
- Glen Reilly (2009)
- Stewart Roberts (2013)
- Clarence "Sonny" Rost (1955)
- John Rost (1991)
- Hilton Ruggles (2009)

== S ==
- Blane Sexton (1950)
- Roy Shepherd (1999)
- Colin Shields (2021)
- Ron Shudra (2010)
- J. J. "Icy" Smith (1988)
- Bill Sneddon (2010)
- Floyd Snider (1951)
- Jimmy Spence (2006)
- Harvey "Red" Stapleford (1986)
- Gary Stefan (2000)
- Rob Stewart (2012)
- Robert Stevenson (2011)
- Sam Stevenson (1986)
- Archie Stinchcombe (1951)
- Les Strongman (1987)
- Ken Swinburne (2006)
- James "Tiny" Syme (2006)
- Thomas "Tuck" Syme (2005)

== T ==
- Glynne Thomas (1991)
- Hep Tindale (2019)
- Nico Toeman (1993)

== U ==
- Mike Urquhart (2007)

== W ==
- Gordon Wade (2021)
- Alan Weeks (1988)
- Jack Wharry (1994)
- Dave Whistle (2013)
- Ian Wight (1993)
- Rob Wilson (2011)
- William Pollock Wylie (2010)
- Bob Wyman (1993)

== Z ==
- Victor "Chick" Zamick (1951)
