= List of Olympic men's ice hockey players for Great Britain =

Men's ice hockey tournaments have been staged at the Olympic Games since 1920. The men's tournament was introduced at the 1920 Summer Olympics, and permanently added to the Winter Olympic Games in 1924. Great Britain has participated in four tournaments: 1924, 1928, 1936, and 1948, winning a gold medal in 1936 and a bronze in 1924. A total of 4 goaltenders and 35 skaters have represented Romania at the Olympics.

Eric Carruthers has scored the most goals, 19, while Jimmy Chappell has the most assists, 3. Frankie Green has the most points, with 16. Seven players competed in two separate Olympics, with Chappell and Gerry Davey playing the most games, 14. Only one player, Carl Erhardt has been inducted into the IIHF Hall of Fame, in 1998.

== Key ==
General terms
Term	Definition
GP	Games played
IIHFHOF	International Ice Hockey Federation Hall of Fame
Olympics	Number of Olympic Games tournaments
Ref(s)	Reference(s)

Goaltender statistical abbreviations
Abbreviation	Definition
W	Wins
L	Losses
T	Ties
Min	Minutes played
SO	Shutouts
GA	Goals against
GAA	Goals against average

Skater statistical abbreviations
Abbreviation	Definition
G	Goals
A	Assists
P	Points
PIM	Penalty minutes

== Goaltenders ==
Goaltenders
Player	Olympics	Tournament(s)	GP	W	L	T	Min	SO	GA	GAA	Notes	Ref(s)
Lorne Carr-Harris	1	1924	–	–	–	–	–	–	–	–	Bronze (1924)	
Jimmy Foster	1	1936	–	–	–	–	–	–	–	–	Gold (1936)	
Stan Simon	1	1948	–	–	–	–	–	–	–	–		
William Speechly	1	1928	–	–	–	–	–	–	–	–		

== Skaters ==
Skaters
Player	Olympics	Tournaments	GP	G	A	P	PIM	Notes	Ref(s)
William Anderson	1	1924	1	0	0	0	0	Bronze (1924)	
Alexander Archer	1	1936	7	2	1	3	0	Gold (1936)	
George Baillie	1	1948	6	0	0	0	2		
Lennie Baker	1	1948	8	5	0	5	2		
Jimmy Borland	1	1936	3	1	0	1	0	Gold (1936)	
Edgar Brenchley	1	1936	7	4	1	5	0	Gold (1936)	
Colin Carruthers	2	1924, 1928	10	10	0	10	0	Bronze (1924)	
Eric Carruthers	2	1924, 1928	11	19	0	0	0	Bronze (1924)	
Jimmy Chappell	2	1936, 1948	14	4	3	7	0	Gold (1936)	
Guy Clarkson	1	1924	3	0	0	0	0	Bronze (1924)	
John Coward	1	1936	6	2	1	3	0	Gold (1936)	
Ross Cuthbert	2	1924, 1928	9	10	0	10	0	Bronze (1924)	
Gordon Dailley	1	1936	7	0	2	2	2	Gold (1936)	
Gerry Davey	2	1936, 1948	14	12	2	14	4	Gold (1936)	
Freddie Dunkelman	1	1948	5	1	0	1	0		
Carl Erhardt	1	1936	6	0	0	0	0	Gold (1936); IIHFHOF (1998)	
Bernard Fawcett	1	1928	3	0	0	0	0		
Art Green	1	1948	6	1	0	1	2		
Frankie Green	1	1948	8	15	1	16	0		
Geoffrey Holmes	1	1924	4	1	0	1	0	Bronze (1924)	
Wilbert Hurst-Brown	1	1928	5	1	0	1	0		
Frank Jardine	1	1948	2	0	0	0	0		
Hamilton Jukes	1	1924	3	2	0	2	0	Bronze (1924)	
Jack Kilpatrick	1	1936	1	0	0	0	0	Gold (1936)	
John Murray	1	1948	6	1	0	1	2		
Johnny Oxley	1	1948	7	7	0	7	4		
Edward Pitblado	1	1924	5	4	0	4	0	Bronze (1924)	
John Rogers	1	1928	4	0	0	0	0		
Blaine Sexton	2	1924, 1928	7	3	0	3	0	Bronze (1924)	
Bert Smith	1	1948	3	0	0	0	0		
Archibald Stinchcombe	2	1936, 1948	12	1	0	1	0	Gold (1936)	
Thomas Syme	1	1948	7	0	0	0	4		
Victor Tait	1	1928	6	0	0	0	0		
Cecil Wylde	1	1928	6	1	0	1	0		
Robert Wyman	1	1936	1	0	0	0	1	Gold (1936)	
