= Great Britain at the 1936 Winter Olympics =

- Flag of the United Kingdom
- IOC code: GBR
- NOC: British Olympic Association

in Garmisch-Partenkirchen
- Competitors: 38 (28 men, 10 women) in 6 sports
- Flag bearer: Frederick McEvoy
- Medals Ranked 7th: Gold 1 Silver 1 Bronze 1 Total 3

Winter Olympics appearances (overview)
- 1924; 1928; 1932; 1936; 1948; 1952; 1956; 1960; 1964; 1968; 1972; 1976; 1980; 1984; 1988; 1992; 1994; 1998; 2002; 2006; 2010; 2014; 2018; 2022; 2026

The United Kingdom of Great Britain and Northern Ireland competed as Great Britain at the 1936 Winter Olympics in Garmisch-Partenkirchen, Germany.

== Medallists ==
Medal	Name	Sport	Event
Gold	Great Britain men's national ice hockey team: James Foster; Carl Erhardt; Gordon Dailley; Archibald Stinchcombe; Edgar Brenchley; John Coward; James Chappell; Alexander Archer; Gerry Davey; James Borland; Robert Wyman; Arthur Child; John Kilpatrick	Ice hockey	Men's competition
Silver	Cecilia Colledge	Figure skating	Women's singles
Bronze	Frederick McEvoy; James Cardno; Guy Dugdale; Charles Green	Bobsleigh	Four-man

== Alpine skiing ==
Men

Athlete	Event	Downhill		Slalom			Total	
Athlete	Event	Time	Rank	Time 1	Time 2	Rank	Total points	Rank
James Riddell	Combined	DNF	–	–	–	–	DNF	–
Sydney Hudson	Combined	6:41.4	40	1:29.9	1:42.4	18	73.92	29
James Palmer-Tomkinson	Combined	5:51.0	24	1:29.8	1:26.5	11	82.52	14
Peter Lunn	Combined	5:35.6	15	1:26.3	1:32.5	13	83.82	12

Women

Athlete	Event	Downhill		Slalom			Total	
Athlete	Event	Time	Rank	Time 1	Time 2	Rank	Total points	Rank
Helen Blane	Combined	7:26.4	28	1:59.9 (+0:06)	1:51.2	20	64.84	25
Birnie Duthie	Combined	6:37.2	19	2:06.2	2:09.3 (+0:12)	26	66.13	23
Jeanette Kessler	Combined	6:05.4	12	1:25.7	1:22.2	6	83.97	8
Evie Pinching	Combined	5:27.2	7	1:40.4	1:38.8	11	82.19	9

== Bobsleigh ==
Sled	Athletes	Event	Run 1		Run 2		Run 3		Run 4		Total	
Sled	Athletes	Event	Time	Rank	Time	Rank	Time	Rank	Time	Rank	Time	Rank
GBR-1	Frederick McEvoy; James Cardno	Two-man	1:25.61	4	1:23.85	6	1:28.58	9	1:22.21	4	5:40.25	4

Sled	Athletes	Event	Run 1		Run 2		Run 3		Run 4		Total	
Sled	Athletes	Event	Time	Rank	Time	Rank	Time	Rank	Time	Rank	Time	Rank
GBR-1	Frederick McEvoy; James Cardno; Guy Dugdale; Charles Green	Four-man	1:23.38	6	1:20.18	4	1:20.74	4	1:19.11	4	5:23.41	3rd place, bronze medalist(s)

== Cross-country skiing ==
Men

Event	Athlete	Race	
Event	Athlete	Time	Rank
18 km	Francis Walter	1'44:13	71

== Figure skating ==
Men

Athlete	Event	CF	FS	Places	Points	Final rank
Geoffrey Yates	Men's singles	10	20	110	348.7	16
Freddie Tomlins	Men's singles	11	10	77	364.2	10
Jack Dunn	Men's singles	8	3	42	387.7	6
Graham Sharp	Men's singles	2	6	34	394.1	5

Women

Athlete	Event	CF	FS	Places	Points	Final rank
Gweneth Butler	Women's singles	5	DNS	–	–	–
Belita Jepson-Turner	Women's singles	14	18	107	352.6	16
Mollie Phillips	Women's singles	12	12	78	366.2	11
Cecilia Colledge	Women's singles	2	2	13.5	418.1	2nd place, silver medalist(s)

Pairs

Athletes	Points	Score	Final rank
Rosemarie Stewart; Ernest Yates	102.5	9.0	10
Violet Cliff; Leslie Cliff	56.5	10.1	7

== Ice hockey ==
=== Group D ===
Top two teams advanced to semifinals

	Pld	W	L	T	GF	GA	Pts
Great Britain	2	2	0	0	4	0	4
Sweden	2	1	1	0	2	1	2
Japan	2	0	2	0	0	5	0

6 February	Great Britain	1-0 (1-0,0-0,0-0)	Sweden
7 February	Great Britain	3-0 (2-0,0-0,1-0)	Japan

=== Group A ===
Top two teams advanced to Medal Round

	Pld	W	L	T	GF	GA	Pts
Great Britain	3	2	0	1	8	3	5
Canada	3	2	1	0	22	4	4
Germany	3	1	1	1	5	8	3
Hungary	3	0	3	0	2	22	0

11 February	Great Britain	2-1 (1-1,0-0,1-0)	Canada
12 February	Germany	1-1 (0-0,0-1,1-0,0-0)	Great Britain
13 February	Great Britain	5-1 (1-0,3-1,1-0)	Hungary

=== Medal Round ===
	Pld	W	L	T	GF	GA	Pts
Great Britain (gold)	3	2	0	1	7	1	5
Canada	3	2	1	0	9	2	4
United States	3	1	1	1	2	1	3
Czechoslovakia	3	0	3	0	0	14	0

Relevant results from the semifinal were carried over to the final

11 February	Great Britain	2-1 (1-1, 0-0, 1-0)	Canada
14 February	Great Britain	5-0 (2-0,3-0,0-0)	Czechoslovakia
15 February	Great Britain	0-0 (0-0,0-0,0-0,0-0,0-0,0-0)	United States

Gold:
Great Britain
James Foster
Carl Erhardt
Gordon Dailley
Archibald Stinchcombe
Edgar Brenchley
John Coward
James Chappell
Alexander Archer
Gerry Davey
James Borland
Robert Wyman
Jack Kilpatrick
Arthur Child

== Nordic combined ==
Events:

- 18 km cross-country skiing
- normal hill ski jumping

The cross-country skiing part of this event was combined with the main medal event of cross-country skiing. Those results can be found above in this article in the cross-country skiing section. Some athletes (but not all) entered in both the cross-country skiing and Nordic combined event, their time on the 18 km was used for both events.

The ski jumping (normal hill) event was held separate from the main medal event of ski jumping, results can be found in the table below.

Griffith Pugh was chosen for all three skiing events, but could not compete because of an injury.

Athlete	Event	Cross-country			Ski Jumping				Total	
Athlete	Event	Time	Points	Rank	Distance 1	Distance 2	Total points	Rank	Points	Rank
Percy Legard	Individual	1'47:47	76.8	48	39.5	45.0	172.5	37	249.3	45
