= Jack Dryburgh =

British ice hockey player (1939–2020)

- Born: 14 January 1939 Kirkcaldy, Scotland
- Died: 21 August 2020 (aged 81)
- Position: Forward
- Played for: Murrayfield Royals; Nottingham Panthers; Southampton Vikings; Brighton Tigers; Liège; Fife Flyers; Perth Panthers
- Playing career: c. 1956–c. 1960s

Jack "Jackie" Dryburgh (14 January 1939 – 21 August 2020) was a Scottish ice hockey player and coach and administrator. Born in Kirkcaldy, he played for various clubs in Scotland and England during the 1950s and 1960s as well as coaching in Aviemore and Solihull. He was a member of the British Ice Hockey Association and was inducted into the British Ice Hockey Hall of Fame in 1991.

== Playing career ==
Dryburgh began his senior playing career with Murrayfield Royals. He moved to England to play for the Nottingham Panthers in the British National League in October 1956. However, he returned to the Royals as he was unable to find suitable employment as an aircraft fitter in the Midlands. The Royals remained unbeaten in the 1957–58 season. He then returned to England in 1959 to play for the Southampton Vikings, scoring four goals in his debut game and finishing the season as the team's leading points scorer. After starting the 1960–61 season back with the Royals, Dryburgh finished the second half of the season with the Vikings.

In 1961, Dryburgh made his only appearance for the Great Britain national team at the World Championship Pool B tournament in Switzerland. The team were undefeated in the tournament although they finished runners up.

Dryburgh joined the Brighton Tigers at the start of the 1961–62 season and remained with them for four seasons. With the Tigers, he scored 205 goals and 262 assists for 467 points in 131 games. After the ice rink in Brighton closed, Dryburgh played for Liège in the Belgian league and made occasional appearances for Fife Flyers, Perth Panthers and the homeless Brighton Tigers.

== Post-playing career ==
In the late 1960s, Dryburgh moved to Aviemore in Scotland where he was the rink manager for many years. Following his time in Aviemore, Dryburgh became the team manager of the Solihull Barons in the 1980s.

Following his stint in Solihull, Dryburgh returned to his home-town, Kirkcaldy, as the rink manager of the Fife Ice Arena. During his time there he acted as bench coach on occasion. Dryburgh also represented the Scottish Rink Managers Association on the now-defunct British Ice Hockey Association.

Dryburgh died on 21 August 2020, at the age of 81.

== Awards and honours ==
- Inducted to the British Ice Hockey Hall of Fame in 1991

== Records ==
- Leading points scorer for Southampton Vikings in the 1959–60 season.
