= Ernie Leacock =

Canadian ice hockey player and referee

Ernest Sidney "Ernie" Leacock (22 March 1906 – 17 April 1976) was a British-Canadian professional ice hockey defender who played in the Pacific Coast Hockey League and the North West Hockey League between 1927 and 1934 for the Victoria Cubs, Tacoma Tigers and Portland Buckaroos. He also played for the Richmond Hawks in the English National League. He was inducted to the British Ice Hockey Hall of Fame in 1987.

Leacock was born in Wood Green, London, and when he was 2, his family moved to Banff, Alberta. This meant he was eligible to play for the Great Britain national ice hockey team and he was selected to play for them in 1935. However, his inclusion in the team was disallowed due to him not having played three qualifying years as an amateur. This led to his retirement from playing and Leacock became a referee instead, a role he undertook in over 2,000 senior games.

Internationally, Leacock officiated at the 1950 and 1951 Ice Hockey World Championships in London and Paris respectively. He was also the first professional referee to officiate at the Winter Olympics when he refereed at the 1952 Winter Olympics in Norway.

In the early 1950s, Leacock was the assistant secretary of the British Ice Hockey Association, working for Bunny Ahearne. Leacock also shared an office with Ahearne's personal secretary Pat Marsh, mentoring her into the role.
