= John Rost =

British ice hockey player

- Born: 28 March 1944 (age 82) London, England
- Position: Defence
- Played for: Brighton Tigers; Wembley Lions; Streatham Redskins
- Playing career: 1962–1982

John Rost (born 28 March 1944) is a former British ice hockey player. He played between 1962 and 1982 for the Brighton Tigers, Wembley Lions and Streatham Redskins. He was inducted to the British Ice Hockey Hall of Fame in 1991.

During his time with Streatham, Rost also coached and managed the team at various times. He became a member of the British Ice Hockey Association in 1976 and has managed both the Great Britain senior and junior teams.

Rost is the son of fellow British Ice Hockey Hall of Famer Clarence Rost and he is the father of former player Warren Rost.
