= Nathan Craze =

Welsh ice hockey player (born 1986)

- Born: 26 November 1986 (age 39) Merthyr Tydfil, Wales
- Height: 6 ft 0 in (183 cm)
- Weight: 175 lb (79 kg; 12 st 7 lb)
- Position: Goaltender
- Caught: Left
- Played for: Belfast Giants; Cardiff Devils; Bracknell Bees; Swindon Wildcats; Edinburgh Capitals
- National team: Great Britain
- Playing career: 2003–2012

Nathan Craze (born 26 November 1986 in Merthyr Tydfil, Wales) is a Welsh former professional ice hockey netminder who is most recently the Goalie coach for the Orlando Solar Bears. He played in the Elite Ice Hockey League for the Cardiff Devils, Belfast Giants and the Edinburgh Capitals. He also played for the Great Britain Under-18 and Under-20 national team as well as one game for the main national team.

== Playing career ==
Craze began his career with the Cardiff Devils before joining the Belfast Giants in 2005. He had an impressive start with the Belfast Giants in the 2005–06 season, originally called up when both Belfast's goalies became injured. As a replacement goaltender he proved himself as one of the most promising young British goaltenders. On his debut for Giants in October 2005, shortly before his 19th birthday, he faced 132 shots in three games but conceded only eleven goals as Giants earned two wins and a draw. Craze played in only 12 games for the Giants in regular season chalking up a save percentage of 92.8.

In the same year he won a gold medal with the Great Britain U-20's in the World Championships Div II Group A in Bucharest, Romania, and was also named Netminder of the Tournament.

He received the International Ice Hockey Federation Directorate's Award of the tournament's Best Netminder when GB won the gold medal in the 2004 World under-18 Championships (Div II) in Lithuania, and he equalled the feat by being voted the IIHF's tournament Best Netminder when GB won the gold medal in the 2006 World under-20 Championships (Div II) in Romania.

In 2006, Craze signed with the Bracknell Bees as their starting goalie, winning the double- English Premier Ice Hockey League and Playoff title in his first season.

The 2007–2008 season saw Craze signed with the Swindon Wildcats of the same league, again serving as their starting goalie.

From 2008 to 2011, Craze continued to re-sign for the Belfast Giants, backing up fellow Welshman Stevie Lyle, and Scot Stephen Murphy.

Craze was selected as backup goalie for the 2011 Div 1 World Championships in Kiev, coming on in the Estonia game and maintaining a 7-0 shut-out with Stephen Murphy. In the pre championships Craze played in his first full international against the Netherlands winning with a score of 5–2.

In 2011, Craze signed for the Edinburgh Capitals, earning himself his first starting role in the Elite Ice Hockey League. It would turn out to be his last season as an active player as he returned to the Belfast Giants the next season to take up a role as goaltending coach for their Scottish National League development team as well as their Under-18 team. He would then become goaltending coach for Great Britain, Milton Keynes Lightning, Coventry Blaze and the Hull Pirates where he was an assistant coach also.

== Awards ==
- 2003–2004 U18 WJC (D2|B) Gold Medal
- 2005–2006 – Vic Batchelder Memorial Trophy
- 2005–2006 EIHL Champion
- U20 WJC (D2|A) Gold Medal
- 2006–2007 EIHA League Champions
- 2006–2007 EIHA Play-off Champions
- 2008–2009 EIHL Challenge Cup Champion
- 2009–2010 EIHL Playoff Champion
- 2010–2011 World Championship (D1|B) Silver Medal
