= Willie Clark (ice hockey) =

Scottish ice hockey player (born 1931)

- Born: 24 May 1931 (age 95) Edinburgh, Scotland
- Position: Goaltender
- Played for: Glasgow Flyers; Murrayfield Royals; Murrayfield Racers
- Playing career: c. 1950–1976

William McLean Clark (born 14 May 1931) is a British retired ice hockey player, manager and administrator. He is a member of the British Ice Hockey Hall of Fame.

== Career ==
Clark began his playing career when he became a steward at the Murrayfield Ice Rink in the early 1950s. After starting as a defenceman he soon moved to being a goaltender and joined the Murrayfield Royals as their backup goaltender. After playing briefly with the Glasgow Flyers, Clark returned to the Royals as their starting goaltender.

With the formation of the Northern League in 1966 the Royals changed their name to the Murrayfield Racers. Clark backstopped the team to three consecutive league and playoff championships in 1969–70, 1970–71 and 1971–72 as well as having won the playoffs in the 1968–69 and 1974–75 seasons.

In 1973, Clark became the manager of the Scottish national ice hockey team — a position he continued with until 1992 after he retired from playing in 1975. Clark also became a member of the Scottish Ice Hockey Association in the 1980s, a position which led to him representing Scotland at the British Ice Hockey Association.

Clark was inducted to the British Ice Hockey Hall of Fame in 1993.
