= Jimmy Spence =

British ice hockey player (1935–2004)

- Born: 21 March 1935 Edinburgh, Scotland
- Died: 9 September 2004 (aged 69) Perth, Scotland
- Position: Centre
- Played for: Perth Panthers; Nottingham Panthers; Glasgow Flyers; Paisley Mohawks; Altrincham Aces; Fife Flyers; Dundee Rockets
- National team: Great Britain
- Playing career: 1950–1973

James Davis Spence (21 March 1935 – 9 September 2004) was a British ice hockey player. He played for various British clubs between 1950 and 1973. He also played for the Great Britain national ice hockey team three times between 1961 and 1973. He was inducted to the British Ice Hockey Hall of Fame in 2006.
