= Joe Watkins (ice hockey) =

English ice hockey player

- Born: 27 October 1979 (age 46) Durham, England, UK
- Height: 188 cm (6 ft 2 in)
- Weight: 86 kg (190 lb; 13 st 8 lb)
- Position: Goaltender
- Catches: Left-handed
- Played for: Sunderland Chiefs (1994-1995); Durham Wasps (1995-1996); Billingham Bombers (1995-1996); Kingston Hawks (1996-1997); Telford Tigers (1997-1999) →Fife Flyers (1998-1999); London Knights (1999-2000); Basingstoke Bison (1999-2000); Bracknell Bees (2000-2003); Bakersfield Condors (2003-2004); Amsterdam Tigers (2004-2005); London Racers (2004-2005); Guildford Flames (2005-2009); Bakersfield Condors (2009-2010)
- National team: Great Britain

Joe Watkins (born 27 October 1979) is a retired English ice hockey goaltender from Durham. He spent four seasons with the Guildford Flames between 2005 and 2009. He was awarded the British Ice Hockey Writers Association British Netminder of the Year award in 2002–03 and 2005–06 while with the Flames and Bracknell Bees, respectively.

Watkins has also played for Sunderland Chiefs of the English Division 1; Telford Tigers, Fife Flyers, Basingstoke Bison in the BNL; Bracknell Bees in the BISL; the now defunct London Racers of the EIHL; Bakersfield Condors in the ECHL; and Amsterdam Bulldogs in the Netherlands. He has also played on the British national team in international games. His brothers Jack and Ben and nephew Sam are all active hockey players, while his brother Tom is a retired defenceman.
