= Jonathan Phillips (ice hockey) =

Welsh ice hockey player (born 1982)

- Born: 14 July 1982 (age 44) Cardiff, Wales
- Height: 5 ft 11 in (180 cm)
- Weight: 181 lb (82 kg; 12 st 13 lb)
- Position: Forward
- Shoots: Right
- NIHL team: Sheffield Steeldogs
- Played for: Sheffield Steelers; Cardiff Devils; EHF Passau Black Hawks
- National team: Great Britain
- Playing career: 1998–present

Jonathan Phillips (born 14 July 1982) is a Welsh professional ice hockey forward who plays for the Sheffield Steeldogs of the NIHL.

He captained the Sheffield Steelers from 2007-2013 and 2014-2023.

Phillips also captained the Great Britain men's national ice hockey team from 2012–2023 and passed 100 senior caps at the 2021 IIHF World Championship.

In May 2022, Phillips passed Ashley Tait for the most senior Great Britain ice hockey caps with 111, achieving the feat at the 2022 IIHF World Championship.

== Career ==
Phillips played both football and ice hockey growing up, however by the age of 11 he fully committed to ice hockey. He caught the attention of Cardiff Devils's coach Paul Heavey while playing for Great Britain's Under 18 and Under 20 International team, and was named to his squad for 1999-00 season. He spent three seasons with the Devils in the Elite Ice Hockey League before joining the Sheffield Steelers under coach Dave Matsos. In his first season with the Steelers, he was named an alternate captain before being promoted to captain midway through the season after Shawn Maltby was injured. During his first three seasons, Phillips led the team to two Playoff Championships and League title. In September 2011, Phillips underwent surgery to repair damaged knee ligaments.

During the 2013–14 season, Phillips lost his captaincy to Stephen Goertzen but it was returned the following season. In April 2017, Phillips helped lead the Steelers to two milestones. He became the most-capped Sheffield Steelers player in history and also helped the team become the second in UK history to record ten playoff wins. After re-signing with the team, he set another milestone by becoming the first EIHL player to reach 1000 games played.

Phillips initially agreed to re-sign with the Sheffield Steelers in 2020 for a 15th year, however after the 2020–21 Elite League season was suspended indefinitely due to the coronavirus pandemic, he moved to the German Oberliga side EHF Passau Black Hawks in November 2020.

In February 2021, Phillips returned to the UK to sign for NIHL side Sheffield Steeldogs ahead of their Spring Cup series. He then rejoined the Sheffield Steelers ahead of the Elite Series in April 2021.

In February 2023, Phillips announced the 2022–23 season would be his last as a professional ice hockey player. He made his final Sheffield Steelers appearance on 16 April 2023, a 7-4 victory over the Nottingham Panthers in the Elite League third/fourth place play-off.

His final professional game - and record-extending 116th senior appearance for Great Britain - was the 2023 IIHF World Championship Division I decider on home ice against Italy at Motorpoint Arena Nottingham on 5 May 2023, with Phillips again as captain. GB won 5-3 to win promotion back to the top tier of the IIHF World Championship.

He would sign with the Sheffield Steeldogs for the 2023-24 season. Later in the season Jonathan would return to the Steelers for a weekend. The Steelers won both games 3-0 (Manchester) 6-3 (Coventry).

In April 2025, Phillips was inducted into the Welsh Sports Hall of Fame.

On 11th of August 2026, Phillips was named National Teams Programme Director for Ice Hockey UK. He is the first individual to hold this role.

== Personal life ==
Phillips met his wife Kirsty in 2000 and they married in 2012.
