= Glynne Thomas =

British ice hockey player (1935–2021)

- Born: 5 May 1935 London, England, UK
- Died: 21 February 2021 (aged 85)
- Position: Goaltender
- Played for: Southampton Vikings; Wembley Lions; Streatham Redskins
- Playing career: 1961–1982

Glynne Thomas (5 May 1935 – 21 February 2021) was a British ice hockey player.

== Career ==
He played for the Southampton Vikings, Wembley Lions and Streatham Redskins during the 1960s, 1970s and 1980s. He also played for the Great Britain national ice hockey team at the 1961 and 1972 Ice Hockey World Championships. He was inducted to the British Ice Hockey Hall of Fame in 1991.

Thomas died in February 2021 at the age of 85.
