= Nicklin =

Nicklin may refer to:

- Frank Nicklin (1895 – 1978), Australian politician
- Jeff Nicklin (1914 – 1945), Canadian soldier and football player
- Percy Nicklin (1893 – 1973), British ice hockey coach
- Electoral district of Nicklin in Australia

== See also ==
- Nicklin Ministry led by Frank Nicklin
- Nicklin Way, street in Queensland, Australia
