= Pat Marsh (ice hockey) =

British ice hockey administrator (1934–2017)

- Born: 12 February 1934; London, England
- Died: 3 May 2017 (aged 83); London, England
- Occupation(s): Secretary and administrator
- Years active: 1953–1987
- Employer: British Ice Hockey Association
- Awards: Paul Loicq Award (2002); British Ice Hockey Hall of Fame (1988)

Patricia Marian Marsh (née Griffiths; 12 February 1934 – 3 May 2017) was a British ice hockey administrator. She served as secretary of the British Ice Hockey Association from 1972 to 1987, and was previously secretary to Bunny Ahearne from 1953 onward. She also worked in the International Ice Hockey Federation (IIHF) office for more than 20 years, and represented Great Britain at IIHF congresses. She was the first female inducted into the British Ice Hockey Hall of Fame, and the first British person to receive the Paul Loicq Award for contributions to international ice hockey.

== Early life ==
Patricia Marian Griffiths was born on 12 February 1934, in the Brixton neighbourhood of South London. She met her future husband Geoff in 1949, who played ice hockey as a goaltender for the Streatham Royals. She went to her first hockey game in 1950, before beginning her career in the sport.

== Ice hockey career ==
Marsh began working as Bunny Ahearne's secretary in 1953. Her hiring coincided with his term as secretary of the at the British Ice Hockey Association (BIHA), and his alternating roles as president and vice-president of the International Ice Hockey Federation (IIHF). The salary for Marsh originally included 13 shillings and sixpence for cleaning the office shared with Ernie Leacock, the BIHA assistant secretary. Leacock was an early mentor for Marsh, who knew the paperwork and how to work for a busy Ahearne who became president of the IIHF in 1957. She left her position to have a child in 1959, at a time when parental leave did not exist. When her replacement failed to meet the high standards, Marsh was recalled as Ahearne's secretary.

After Ahearne became president of the BIHA in 1971, Marsh became secretary of the BIHA in 1972, and worked in the IIHF offices for more than 20 years. She represented the BIHA at IIHF congresses in Prague in 1972, and in Colorado Springs in 1986. She travelled abroad with the Great Britain men's national under-18 ice hockey team, and stated her favourite tournament was the gold medal victory in Pool-C at the 1986 IIHF European U18 Championship in Spain. During her involved in hockey, the game in Great Britain changed from being semi-professional in the 1950s, to large sponsorships in the 1980s which she described as "the most exciting time of her career in the sport".

Marsh retired as secretary of the BIHA in 1987, and was succeeded by David Pickles. She was immediately appointed to the BIHA board of directors, the first woman to hold the position. As a director, she served as a delegate to the IIHF European Women Championships, and oversaw hockey's doping in sport control programme. She also served as an advisor to the Ice Hockey Superleague until her retirement as a director in 1999.

== Honours and awards ==
In 1987, Marsh received the Ahearne Medal from the BIHA for services to the game in Great Britain. In 1988, she became the first female inducted into British Ice Hockey Hall of Fame. In 2002, she became the first person from Great Britain to receive of the Paul Loicq Award for contributions to international ice hockey.

Upon retirement, Marsh was remembered as being "well-liked but now overworked". She was crediting for "[maintaining] the same unflappable composure during her career", and that "any problem was dealt with calmly and efficiently, with only the vaguest hint of exasperation". Past BIHA president Freddie Meredith remarked in 2017, that Marsh devoted a lifetime to the sport of ice hockey, and that hockey's growth in Great Britain during the 1980s and the 1990s would have been impossible without Marsh's efforts, and that "she was truly the first lady of British Ice Hockey".

== Personal life ==
Marsh was married to Geoff, gave birth to a daughter in 1959. Marsh's husband died in 2003. She died on 20 April 2017, in the Croydon neighbourhood of South London. The funeral for Marsh was scheduled for 12 May 2017, in Kent.

== See also ==
- Ice hockey in the United Kingdom
- List of members of the British Ice Hockey Hall of Fame
