= James Syme (ice hockey) =

British ice hockey player

- Born: 1 October 1926 Blairhall, Scotland
- Died: 22 August 1973 (aged 46) London, Ontario, Canada
- Height: 6 ft 2 in (188 cm)
- Position: Defender
- Played for: Dunfermline Vikings; Paisley Pirates
- Playing career: 1948–1957

James "Tiny" Syme (1 October 1926 – 22 August 1973) was a British ice hockey player. He played for the Dunfermline Vikings and Paisley Pirates during the 1940s and 1950s. He also played for the Great Britain national ice hockey team at the 1950 Ice Hockey World Championships. He emigrated to Canada in 1957 where he continued to play ice hockey with the Strathroy Rockets and the St. Thomas Royals in the OHA Senior A Hockey League. He was inducted to the British Ice Hockey Hall of Fame in 2006.

He is the older brother of fellow British Ice Hockey Hall of Fame member, Thomas "Tuck" Syme.
