= John Coward =

John Coward may refer to:

- John Coward (ice hockey)
- Sir John Coward (Royal Navy officer)
- John Coward, airline pilot, see British Airways Flight 38.
