= British Netminder of the Year =

UK ice hockey award

- Description: Best British ice hockey netminder as voted by journalists
- Country: United Kingdom
- Presented by: Ice Hockey Journalists UK (IHJUK)
- Website: www.ihjuk.co.uk

The British Netminder of the Year award is an annual British ice hockey award made to the best British netminder as voted for by members of Ice Hockey Journalists UK. The award was first made in 1999.

== Past winners ==
Season	Winner	Team
2008–09	Stephen Murphy	Manchester Phoenix
2007–08	Stevie Lyle	Basingstoke Bison/Belfast Giants
2006–07	Stephen Murphy	Edinburgh Capitals
2005–06	Joe Watkins	Guildford Flames
2004–05	Stevie Lyle	Guildford Flames
2003–04	Stevie Lyle	Guildford Flames
2002–03	Joe Watkins	Bracknell Bees
2001–02	Stephen Murphy	Dundee Stars
2000–01	Stevie Lyle	Cardiff Devils
1999–00	Stevie Lyle	Cardiff Devils
1998–99	Stevie Lyle	Cardiff Devils

== See also ==
- Man of Ice Awards
