= Kellough =

Kellough is a surname. Notable people with the surname include:

- Doc Kellough (died c. 1956–57), Canadian ice hockey player
- Kaie Kellough (born 1975), Canadian poet and writer
