= Ian Cooper (ice hockey) =

British ice hockey player

- Born: 29 November 1968 (age 57) Durham, England
- Height: 6 ft 0 in (183 cm)
- Weight: 199 lb (90 kg; 14 st 3 lb)
- Position: Right wing
- Shot: Left
- Played for: Durham Wasps; Cardiff Devils; London Knights; Guildford Flames; Chelmsford Chieftains
- National team: Great Britain
- Playing career: 1984–2001

Ian Edward Cooper (born 29 November 1968 in Durham, England) is a retired British ice hockey player. He is a member of the British Ice Hockey Hall of Fame and is the younger brother of fellow Hall of Fame member, Stephen Cooper. He has a daughter and son named Lola and Felix Cooper. He is married to Ruth Cooper.

== Playing career ==
.

=== Club ===
Cooper started his senior ice hockey career with the Durham Wasps during the 1984–85 season when he was still playing junior ice hockey with the Wasps' junior team, the Durham Hornets. Appearing for the Wasps 30 times that season, he scored just three goals. His career took off the following season when he appeared exclusively for the Wasps and scored 38 goals and 36 assists in all competitions and helped the Wasps to retain their British Hockey League (BHL) Premier Division title.

Cooper stayed with the Wasps for two more seasons — being named to the 1988 BHL all-star team along the way — before an ambitious Cardiff Devils in Division 1 of the BHL offered him enough money to play full-time and signed him and his brother for the 1988–89 season. Cooper helped Cardiff to win the promotion playoffs to the Premier Division as well gaining his second all-star team award. The following season, Cooper helped the Devils to win the league championship and the playoffs.

Being able to get professional wages in his home town, Cooper returned to the Durham Wasps for the 1990–91 season where he helped them to win a grand slam of the Norwich Union Trophy, the league championship and the playoffs. After helping the Wasps to retain the league championship and the playoffs in the 1991–92 season, Cooper returned to the Cardiff Devils for the 1992–93 season. During his six seasons with the Devils, Cooper helped them to win two league championships and two playoffs in the BHL and one league championship and a Bensons & Hedges Cup in the Ice Hockey Superleague (ISL).

Cardiff did not renew Cooper's contract in 1998 and he joined the London Knights as captain for their inaugural campaign in the 1998–99 season of the ISL. He stayed with the Knights for 18 months until they arranged his move to the Guildford Flames where he finished the 1999&] in the BNL and then 10 games for the Chelmsford Chieftains in the English Premier Ice Hockey League, Cooper retired from ice hockey moved into media management as a career.

=== International ===
Cooper first appeared for the Great Britain national ice hockey team when he represented his country at the under-18 level in 1985. He has made a total of 80 appearances for the national team in the under-18, under-20 and the senior teams. During his time with the senior team he helped them climb the international ranks from Pool D to Pool A of the Ice Hockey World Championships before cementing their position in Pool B. Cooper described the Pool B gold medal he won in 1993 as "something special".

== Awards and honours ==
- Named to the BHL British All Stars team in 1988.
- Named to the BHL Division 1 British Players all star team in 1989.
- Ahearne Medal for contributions to the sport in 1996.
- Inducted to the British Ice Hockey Hall of Fame in 2002.

== Career statistics ==
=== Club ===
			Regular season					Playoffs				
Season	Team	League	GP	G	A	Pts	PIM	GP	G	A	Pts	PIM
1984–85	Durham Wasps	BHL	19	3	2	5	0	3	0	0	0	0
1985–86	Durham Wasps	BHL	35	29	24	53	42	5	1	5	6	0
1986–87	Durham Wasps	BHL	35	23	25	48	35	6	5	5	10	6
1987–88	Durham Wasps	BHL	33	48	49	97	72	6	7	5	12	18
1988–89	Cardiff Devils	BHL	24	64	48	112	113	–	–	–	–	–
1989–90	Cardiff Devils	BHL	32	48	53	101	94	6	8	9	17	14
1990–91	Durham Wasps	BHL	33	44	63	107	116	8	11	17	28	34
1991–92	Durham Wasps	BHL	36	51	49	100	140	7	12	7	19	28
1992–93	Cardiff Devils	BHL	36	51	55	106	56	8	12	13	25	32
1993–94	Cardiff Devils	BHL	34	54	64	118	58	8	7	14	21	28
1994–95	Cardiff Devils	BHL	44	52	71	123	95	5	7	10	17	6
1995–96	Cardiff Devils	BHL	36	35	40	75	103	6	0	7	7	18
1996–97	Cardiff Devils	ISL	41	16	17	33	62	7	4	5	9	2
1997–98	Cardiff Devils	ISL	28	4	7	11	78	9	1	4	5	12
1998–99	London Knights	ISL	36	4	11	15	28	6	1	1	2	6
1999–00	London Knights	ISL	18	3	4	7	51	–	–	–	–	–
1999–00	Guildford Flames	BNL	7	1	8	9	14	6	1	4	5	6
2000–01	Basingstoke Bison	BNL	2	???	???	???	???	–	–	–	–	–
2000–01	Chelmsford Chieftains	EPIHL	10	5	18	23	16	–	–	–	–	–

=== International ===
			Tournament				
Year	Team	Event	GP	G	A	Pts	PIM
1986	Great Britain	World Junior Championships Pool C	5	1	2	3	2
1986	Great Britain	European Junior Championships Pool C	4	3	0	3	6
1991	Great Britain	World Championships Pool C	8	4	2	6	16
1992	Great Britain	World Championships Pool C	5	3	6	9	8
1993	Great Britain	World Championships Pool B	7	4	4	8	6
1994	Great Britain	World Championships Pool A	6	1	0	1	4
1995	Great Britain	World Championships Pool B	2	1	0	1	2
1997	Great Britain	World Championships Pool B	7	0	0	0	12
1999	Great Britain	World Championships Pool B	7	1	2	3	2
1999	Great Britain	World Championships Pool A Qualifiers	1	0	0	0	0
2000	Great Britain	World Championships Pool B	7	2	2	4	10
