= Derek Reilly =

British ice hockey player

- Born: c. 1947 (age 78–79)
- Position: Left wing / Centre
- Played for: Murrayfield Racers
- National team: Great Britain
- Playing career: 1964–1984

Derek Reilly (born c. 1947) is a former British professional ice hockey player. He played his entire playing career with the Murrayfield Racers between 1964 and 1984. He also played for the Great Britain national ice hockey team 19 times at three World Championships scoring 10 goals and five assists. He was inducted into the British Ice Hockey Hall of Fame in 1987.
