= Roy Shepherd =

British ice hockey player (1931–2008)

- Born: 4 August 1931 Acton, England
- Died: 11 April 2008 (aged 76) Haywards Heath, West Sussex, England
- Position: Defence
- Played for: Wembley Lions; Southampton Vikings; Brighton Tigers
- Playing career: 1951–1978

Roy Walter William Shepherd (4 August 1931 – 11 April 2008) was a British ice hockey player. He played between 1951 and 1978 for the Wembley Lions, Southampton Vikings and Brighton Tigers. He also played for the Great Britain national ice hockey team between 1951 and 1962. He was inducted to the British Ice Hockey Hall of Fame in 1999. Shepherd died in Haywards Heath, West Sussex on 11 April 2008, at the age of 76.
