= Robert Lebel (ice hockey) =

Canadian ice hockey administrator (1905–1999)

- Born: September 21, 1905; Quebec City, Quebec, Canada
- Died: September 20, 1999 (aged 93); Chambly, Quebec, Canada
- Education: Quebec City Commercial Academy
- Occupations: Hockey administrator, politician, bookkeeper
- Known for: President of the IIHF, CAHA, QAHA and QMJHL
- Awards: Hockey Hall of Fame, IIHF Hall of Fame, 125th Anniversary of the Confederation of Canada Medal

Robert Lebel or LeBel (September 21, 1905 – September 20, 1999) was a Canadian ice hockey administrator, who served as president of the Canadian Amateur Hockey Association (CAHA), and the International Ice Hockey Federation (IIHF). Lebel founded a senior ice hockey league during World War II, and then became president of the Quebec Amateur Hockey Association (QAHA). He was a mayor of Chambly, Quebec, before joining the CAHA as an executive member and later its president. He was president of the IIHF during the early Cold War era, the last Canadian to lead the federation. He later founded the Quebec Major Junior Hockey League for junior ice hockey players. He received the 125th Anniversary of the Confederation of Canada Medal, was inducted into the Hockey Hall of Fame, the IIHF Hall of Fame, three halls of fame in his native Quebec, and is the namesake of the Robert Lebel Trophy.

== Early life ==
Lebel was born September 21, 1905, in Quebec City, Quebec. He played junior ice hockey as a goaltender in the Beaupre Shore junior hockey league. He later played in the Quebec Senior Hockey League and several amateur hockey teams in New York state. After retiring from playing, Lebel was a referee for nine seasons, and briefly coached with the Montréal-Nord Crescent Club in the Intermediate Hockey League.

Lebel graduated from the Quebec City Commercial Academy. He later worked as a bank teller and a bookkeeper at the Bank of Montreal branch in the Château Frontenac. He subsequently worked with the Huguenot Trust Company in New Rochelle, New York, for a year.

== Beginnings in Quebec ==
Lebel began his career as a hockey administrator when he founded the Interprovincial Senior Hockey League in 1944, and he served as its president until 1947. The league included many players stationed at RCAF Station Lachine during World War II. He also served as president of the Quebec Amateur Hockey Association (QAHA) from 1945 to 1946, and again from 1951 to 1955. He relocated to Chambly, Quebec, in 1951 and became vice president of Bennett Limited. In June 1955, his term as QAHA president ended, and he was replaced by Lionel Fleury. Lebel then became president of the Quebec Amateur Hockey League from 1955 to 1957. At the same time, Lebel entered municipal politics in 1955, and served as the mayor of Chambly until 1957. During his time as mayor, he initiated the construction of a water treatment facility for the greater Chambly area, completed in 1959.

== Canadian amateur hockey ==
Lebel served as first vice-president of the Canadian Amateur Hockey Association (CAHA) from 1955 to 1957 under president Jimmy Dunn, and then succeeded him as president from 1957 to 1959, when he was followed by Gordon Juckes. When he was elected CAHA president on May 29, 1957, he became the first French Canadian to lead the country in hockey. When the Hockey Hall of Fame opened its first permanent building in 1961, Lebel represented the CAHA on its governing committee. He remained in that position for 17 years, and was made a trustee of the George Richardson Memorial Trophy, and the W. G. Hardy Trophy.

== International ice hockey ==
Lebel became president of the International Ice Hockey Federation in July 1960; he was the second and most recent Canadian to hold the position since W. G. Hardy was elected in 1948. Lebel served as IIHF president until 1962. Due to a fear of flying, Lebel preferred a transatlantic crossing by sea, when attending federation meetings in Europe.

During the third year of his tenure as president, he was embattled by the Cold War on ice. The 1962 Ice Hockey World Championships were scheduled for Colorado Springs, Colorado, for the first world championship hosted in the United States, and also the first to be played after the construction of the Berlin Wall in August 1961. Lebel warned that there would be sanctions if the West Germany team refused to play the East Germany team as had happened in the previous year's championships. Prior to the 1962 event, the East German team were denied travel permits by the Allied Travel Bureau, so they were prevented from getting travel visas to the United States. In response, Lebel reiterated that East Germany was a member in good standing with the IIHF, entitled to play at the event, and that the IIHF would do everything in its power to enable East Germany to travel. The Soviet Union subsequently withdrew in protest, which began speculation of an Eastern Bloc boycott of the event. Lebel declined requests to relocate the event, said that it would go on as planned, and appealed to the travel bureau on behalf of the East Germans. He also denied a motion by the Soviets to remove the European Championship and World Championship statuses from the event, since the motion violated the IIHF constitution. Canada wanted to use former professionals at the event, but Lebel defended the IIHF decision to exclude players reinstated as amateurs after September 1, 1961, even though it worked against many Canadian players. Lebel was satisfied with the overall event including 14 teams despite the Soviet Union and Czechoslovakia not attending. After the event, Soviet news agency TASS called for Lebel to be replaced at the IIHF, and for measures put in place to prevent politics in sports.

Lebel said that once his term expired, it would be Europe's turn for the presidency. He later sat on the North American board of the IIHF. He was also appointed to the national advisory council on fitness and amateur sports, by health minister Judy LaMarsh on March 5, 1964. Lebel resigned his IIHF council post in May 1964. He agreed that Bunny Ahearne, his successor as president of the IIHF, was correct in his decision to place Canada fourth at the 1964 World Ice Hockey Championships, according to IIHF statutes.

== Return to Quebec hockey ==
Lebel returned to hockey in Quebec, and in 1969, he facilitated the merger of the Quebec Junior Hockey League with the Metropolitan Montreal Junior Hockey League, forming the Quebec Major Junior Hockey League (QMJHL). He was later installed as the founding president of the league. He retired from his position with Bennett Limited in Chambly, in 1971. He presided over the QMJHL until 1975, when he retired from a career as a hockey administrator. He was named an honorary president of the league in 1975.

== Honours and awards ==
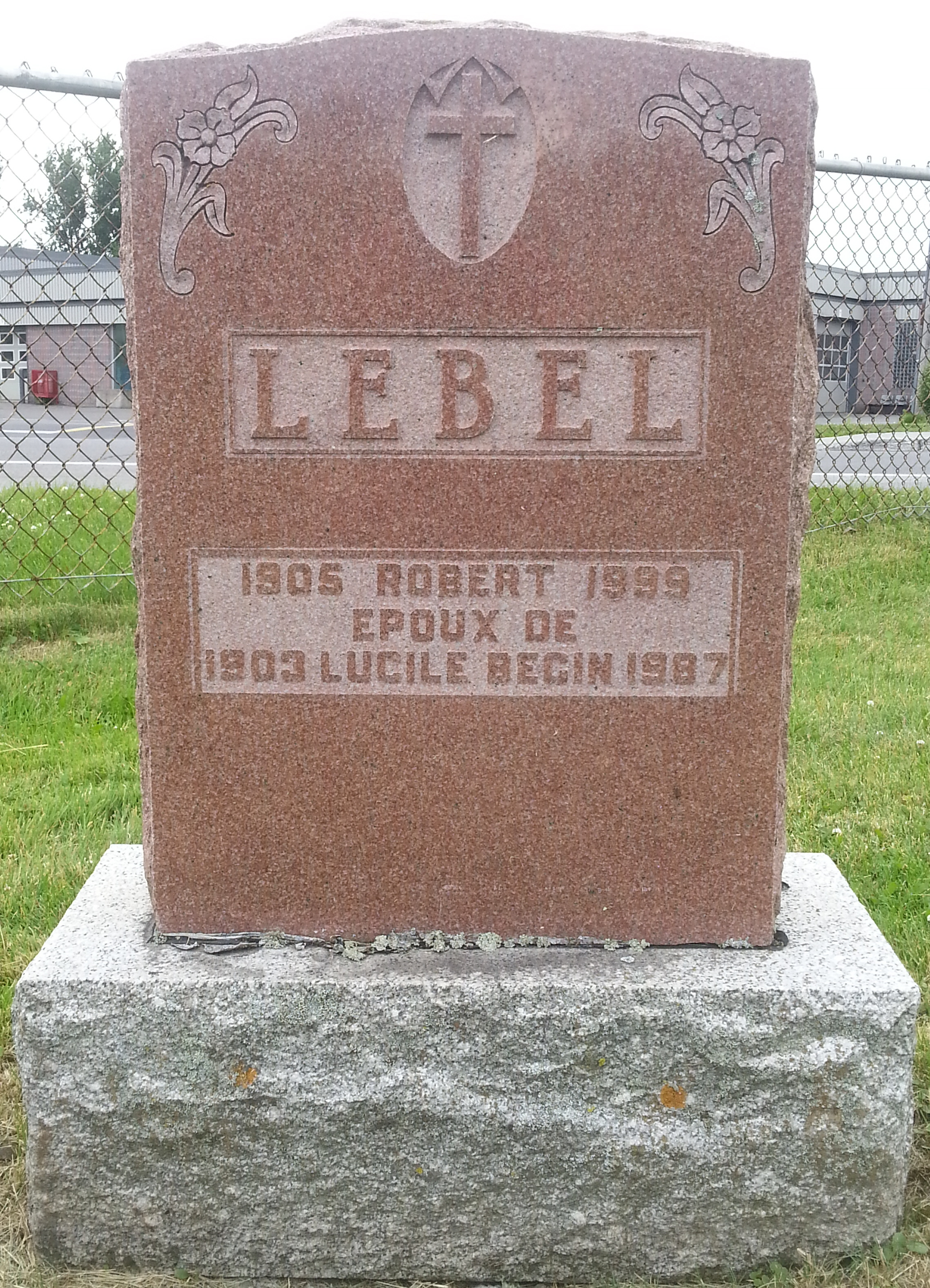
Lebel's grave stone in the Saint Joseph Church cemetery in Chambly, Quebec

While Lebel was president of the CAHA, he received the AHAUS Citation Award in 1958, for his contributions to the advancement of American amateur hockey, and received the Ontario Hockey Association Gold Stick award in 1959. In 1964 after completing his IIHF service, he was made a life member of both the CAHA, and the QAHA. While with the QMJHL in 1970, he was inducted into the Hockey Hall of Fame as a builder.

Lebel was inducted into the Quebec Sports Hall of Fame in 1991. When the Hockey Québec Hall of Fame opened in 1991, he was among the first class of inductees. In 1992, he received the 125th Anniversary of the Confederation of Canada Medal for significant contributions to the community, and Canada. He was the inaugural inductee into the QMJHL Hall of Fame, on September 6, 1995. He was inducted into the IIHF Hall of Fame as a builder, in the inaugural class of 1997. Lebel was also made an honorary life member by USA Hockey.

Lebel played golf competitively. He won titles at the Kent Golf Club, the Sherbrooke Open and the Bank of Montreal Open.

== Death and legacy ==
Lebel lived in Chambly after retiring, at 26 Saint-Pierre St. He died at home on September 20, 1999, on the eve of his 94th birthday. He was predeceased by his wife Lucille Bégin in 1987, and survived by his son Jean, three grandchildren and four great-grandchildren. The city flag at town hall was lowered to half-mast for a week, until his burial on September 27, at the St. Joseph Church cemetery in Chambly.

In the 1990s, Lebel donated the Emma Albani fund for musical arts to the town of Chambly. The Journal de Chambly remembered Lebel as being an authoritarian when he was younger, then later in life as sympathetic but direct. He was also known for his wit, and being outspoken. The Réseau des sports described Lebel as being both frank and generous.

The town of Chambly renamed the municipal sports centre in honour of Lebel on September 14, 1976. The Centre Sportif Lebel includes indoor and outdoor skating rinks. After his death, the town named a boulevard for Lebel.

The Quebec Major Junior Hockey League renamed its west division to the Lebel division for the 1976–77 QMJHL season. The league also created the Robert Lebel Trophy in the 1977–78 QMJHL season, awarded to the team with the best goals against average.

Preceded by Bunny Ahearne	President of the IIHF; 1960–1963	Succeeded by Bunny Ahearne
