= Thomas Syme =

British ice hockey player

- Born: 15 May 1928 Blairhall, Scotland
- Died: 22 August 2011 (aged 83) Palmdale, California, U.S.
- Height: 6 ft 2 in (188 cm)
- Weight: 190 lb (86 kg; 13 st 8 lb)
- Position: Defence
- Played for: Dunfermline Vikings; Paisley Pirates
- National team: Great Britain
- Playing career: 1946–1957

Thomas Woods "Tom, Tuck" Syme (15 May 1928 – 22 August 2011) was a British ice hockey player. He played for the Dunfermline Vikings and Paisley Pirates during the 1940s and 1950s. He also played for the Great Britain national ice hockey team at the 1948 Winter Olympics and the 1950 Ice Hockey World Championships. After retiring from ice hockey he emigrated to Canada before settling in the United States in 1960. He was inducted to the British Ice Hockey Hall of Fame in 2005.

He was the younger brother of fellow British Ice Hockey Hall of Fame member, James "Tiny" Syme. He died 22 August 2011 of kidney failure.
