= Clarence Rost =

Canadian ice hockey player

- Born: March 9, 1914 Winnipeg, Manitoba, Canada
- Died: August 7, 2008 (aged 94)
- Position: Defence
- Played for: Wembley Monarchs; Wembley Lions
- Playing career: 1935–1958

Clarence Rost (March 9, 1914 – August 7, 2008) was a Canadian professional ice hockey player. Known by the nickname 'Sonny' he played between 1935 and 1958 for the Wembley Monarchs and the Wembley Lions in the English National League and the British National League. He was inducted to the British Ice Hockey Hall of Fame in 1955.

Rost is the father of fellow British Ice Hockey Hall of Famer John Rost.
