= Shannon Hope =

Canadian ice hockey player

- Born: November 25, 1962 (age 63) Peterborough, Ontario, Canada
- Height: 6 ft 0 in (183 cm)
- Weight: 189 lb (86 kg; 13 st 7 lb)
- Position: Defence
- Played for: Peterborough Pirates; Cardiff Devils
- Playing career: 1984–2000

Shannon Hope (born November 25, 1962) is a Canadian retired professional ice hockey defender who played for the Peterborough Pirates and the Cardiff Devils as well as for the Great Britain national team, for whom he was the captain between 1995 and 1997. He was inducted into the British Ice Hockey Hall of Fame in 1999.

Hope was born in Peterborough, Ontario.

After retiring from playing, Hope started his own ice hockey clothing business, Shinedog. Hope rejoined the Devils organisation as Director of Hockey in 2008 when the team was bought by Comms Direct owner Matt Burge and continues to work towards re-establishing the 'Next Generation Devils' brand within Wales and the UK.

== Awards and honours ==
- BHL Division 1 All-star in 1989.
- BHL Premier Division All-star in 1990 and 1991.
- Awarded testimonial match by Cardiff Devils on 25 November 1997.
- Inducted to the British Ice Hockey Hall of Fame in 1999.
- Jersey number 35 retired by Cardiff Devils.

== Career statistics ==
=== Club ===
			Regular season					Playoffs				
Season	Team	League	GP	G	A	Pts	PIM	GP	G	A	Pts	PIM
1984–85	Peterborough Pirates	BHL 1	20	54	76	130	40					
1987–88	Cardiff Devils	BHL 1	22	34	27	61	122					
1988–89	Cardiff Devils	BHL 1	23	27	60	87	50					
1989–90	Cardiff Devils	BHL Prem	32	21	44	65	49	6	2	6	8	6
1990–91	Cardiff Devils	BHL Prem	36	14	51	65	76	7	5	4	9	16
1991–92	Cardiff Devils	BHL Prem	30	15	34	49	60	5	2	12	14	11
1992–93	Cardiff Devils	BHL Prem	33	17	49	66	70	8	4	13	17	14
1993–94	Cardiff Devils	BHL Prem	57	16	68	84	106	8	3	12	15	8
1994–95	Cardiff Devils	BHL Prem	42	9	51	60	103	6	0	8	8	4
1995–96	Cardiff Devils	BHL Prem	36	7	29	36	52	6	1	4	5	14
1996–97	Cardiff Devils	ISL	42	2	11	13	67	7	3	2	5	2
1997–98	Cardiff Devils	ISL	38	2	10	12	44	9	1	3	4	2
1999–00	Peterborough Pirates	BNL	3	1	1	2	6	8	5	5	10	34

=== International ===
			Tournament				
Year	Team	Event	GP	G	A	Pts	PIM
1992	Great Britain	World Championships Pool C	2	0	0	0	0
1993	Great Britain	World Championships Pool B	7	0	2	2	4
1994	Great Britain	World Championships Pool A	6	0	1	1	14
1995	Great Britain	World Championships Pool B	6	1	1	2	14
1997	Great Britain	World Championships Pool B	7	0	2	2	10
