= Bill Booth (ice hockey) =

Canadian ice hockey player

- Born: August 20, 1919 Montreal, Quebec, Canada
- Died: September 25, 1986 (aged 67) unknown
- Position: Defence
- Played for: Lachute; Valleyfield Braves; Brighton Tigers; Durham Wasps
- Playing career: 1939–1963

William Walton Booth (August 20, 1919 – September 25, 1986) was a Canadian ice hockey player who mainly played in Great Britain during the 1940s and 1950s, although he is best remembered as a Coach with the Durham Wasps. He is a member of the British Ice Hockey Hall of Fame.

== Career ==
Although he learned to skate by the age of eight, Bill Booth did not start playing ice hockey until he was 14 years old. However, he was still good enough to earn a place with Lachute in the Montreal Senior Provincial League (MSPL) at the age of 20, before joining the Valleyfield Braves.

In 1943, whilst serving with the Royal Canadian Ordnance Corps during World War II, Booth played in two exhibition games against the Boston Bruins and the Montreal Canadiens. In 1944, Booth went to Europe with the Canadian Army. After the war, he stayed in Europe playing ice hockey.

Booth joined the Brighton Tigers in 1946 following his demobilization from the army. Booth played with the Tigers for three seasons — winning the Autumn Cup and the league championship in 1946–47 as well as the league championship in 1947–48. In 158 games played for the Tigers, Booth's statistics are: 26 goals, 41 assists, 67 points and 250 penalty minutes.

Booth joined the Durham Wasps in 1949 as Player/Coach, a position he held until 1963 when he became the head coach for the 1963–64 season. Under his tenure, the Wasps won the Northern tournament seven times and the playoffs three times.

Booth retired from playing in 1963 after he had suffered from jaundice. He then married a local girl, Isobel, before continuing his involvement with British ice hockey by writing articles for the monthly magazine The Hockey Fan. Booth's involvement with ice hockey continued into the 1980s when he was north-eastern correspondent for the Ice Hockey World magazine.

== Awards ==
- Named to the ENL All-star B Team in 1947.
