= Bunny Ahearne =

British ice hockey administrator and businessman (1900–1985)

- Born: John Francis Ahearne; 19 November 1900; Kinnagh, County Wexford, Ireland
- Died: 11 April 1985 (aged 84); Toddington, Gloucestershire, England
- Occupation: Travel agent
- Known for: International Ice Hockey Federation and British Ice Hockey Association executive
- Awards: Hockey Hall of Fame; British Ice Hockey Hall of Fame; IIHF Hall of Fame

John Francis "Bunny" Ahearne (19 November 1900 – 11 April 1985) was a British ice hockey administrator and businessman. He served rotating terms as president and vice-president of the International Ice Hockey Federation (IIHF) from 1951 to 1975, and was the secretary of the British Ice Hockey Association from 1934 to 1971, and later its president until 1982. He began in hockey by managing the last Great Britain team to win a gold medal at the Winter Olympic Games, before moving to the international stage. He implemented business reforms at the IIHF, oversaw the growth of ice hockey to new countries, and expanded the Ice Hockey World Championships. He was inducted into both the Hockey Hall of Fame and the British Ice Hockey Hall of Fame during his lifetime and was posthumously inducted into the IIHF Hall of Fame.

== Early life ==
Ahearne was born on 19 November 1900, in Kinnagh, County Wexford, Ireland. He spent the majority of his life residing in England working as a travel agent, and never played ice hockey.

== British ice hockey ==
Ahearne was secretary of the British Ice Hockey Association (BIHA) from 1934 to 1971, and served as the association's president from 1971 to 1982. During this time he was also the United Kingdom's delegate to meetings of the International Ice Hockey Federation (IIHF). During this time he hired Pat Marsh as his secretary, who later took over as the BIHA secretary when Ahearne became president.

Ahearne was the head coach of the Great Britain ice hockey team which won a bronze medal at the 1935 Ice Hockey World Championships. He continued working on the business management of the team for another three years, and appointed Percy Nicklin to take over the coaching duties.

Prior to Ahearne's involvement in the national team, it was composed of current and former army officers. He decreed that the national team needed to play at least four British-born players, and augmented the roster with imports. He built a powerful British team by recruiting players living in Canada who obtained British citizenship under the British nationality law, through ancestral linkages to the United Kingdom. Ahearne went to Canada in 1935 with team captain Carl Erhardt to find the best available players. The Canadian Amateur Hockey Association (CAHA) reluctantly agreed to allow permission for any player wishing to transfer, as long as the BIHA would only use such players who were properly transferred.

The combined efforts of Ahearne, Nicklin, and Erhardt went on to win an Olympic gold medal and two silver medals for Great Britain in the next three years. The team earned the gold medal in ice hockey at the 1936 Winter Olympics hosted in Garmisch-Partenkirchen, which also determined the 1936 European Championship and the 1936 World Championship. Great Britain later won silver at both the 1937 Ice Hockey World Championships and the 1938 Ice Hockey World Championships, and won the European championship both times.

== International ice hockey ==
Ahearne was part of the IIHF delegation who travelled to North America in 1947 to convince the CAHA and the Amateur Hockey Association of the United States (AHAUS) to resume being active members. He later welcomed the Soviet Union Ice Hockey Federation to IIHF membership in 1952. He served as the CAHA's representative in Europe until 1952, and booked European tours and accommodations for the Canada men's national ice hockey team. He resigned after an altercation with CAHA president Doug Grimston and disagreements over the handling of a tour for the Edmonton Mercurys.

Ahearne served as vice-president of the IIHF from 1951 to 1957, then as president from 1957 to 1960, then as vice-president again from 1960 to 1963, returned to the presidency from 1963 to 1966, returned to vice-presidency from 1966 to 1969, and then president again from 1969 to 1975. The alternating terms as president and vice-president arose from the agreement where the CAHA and AHAUS rejoined the IIHF with the promise of rotating the top position between Europe and North America. The other IIHF presidents during that time were Robert Lebel from Canada (1960 to 1963), and William Thayer Tutt from the United States (1966 to 1969).

During his time with the IIHF, Ahearne is credited with improving its finances, cooperating with the International Olympic Committee (IOC), and helping to develop and introduce hockey to new countries. He also transformed the Ice Hockey World Championships into a well-known annual tournament, and implemented the splitting of the event into different tiers of competition. He also oversaw the foundation of both the IIHF European Junior Championships and the Izvestia Cup in 1967. He introduced advertisements on the side boards of hockey rinks during the World Championships, and secured broadcasting rights for international matches. He is also credited for redistributing funds and profit sharing from these events to IIHF members for development.

In 1969, the IIHF voted to allow limited use of former professional players at international competitions. The decision was later challenged by the Soviet Union, claiming that Canada would abuse the change at the upcoming 1970 World Ice Hockey Championships. When the IOC did not support the change, Ahearne was caught in the middle and later changed his position. The CAHA responded by withdrawing from international play until 1977. This dispute led to the negotiation of the 1972 Summit Series, of which Ahearne was one of the four signatories who approved the event on 18 April 1972, along with Fred Page, Joe Kryczka, and Andrey Starovoytov. He retired as IIHF president in 1975, and was replaced by Günther Sabetzki.

== Personal life ==
Ahearne operated Blue Riband Travel from offices on Mayfair. He was married to Betty, and had two sons. He died on 11 April 1985, at his home in Toddington, Gloucestershire, due to heart failure. Gord Renwick attended the funeral on behalf of Canada, and said that despite their disagreements, Ahearne was respected by Canadian officials for his business sense.

== Honours and awards ==
Ahearne received Ontario Hockey Association Gold Stick Award in 1948, and the AHAUS citation award in 1949. He was named an honorary president of the IIHF in 1975. He was inducted into the Hockey Hall of Fame in 1977, the British Ice Hockey Hall of Fame in 1987, and posthumously inducted into IIHF Hall of Fame in 1997. He also received the Cross of Finland, the Order of Yugoslavia, and the Gold Cross of Austria. He was the namesake of the Ahearne Cup that began in 1952 in Sweden, from the combined efforts of Djurgårdens IF Hockey and the Dagens Nyheter newspaper.

Preceded by Walter Brown	President of the IIHF; 1957–1960	Succeeded by Robert Lebel
Preceded by Robert Lebel	President of the IIHF; 1963–1966	Succeeded by William Thayer Tutt
Preceded by William Thayer Tutt	President of the IIHF; 1969–1975	Succeeded by Günther Sabetzki
Preceded by Victor Hubert Tait	President of the BIHA; 1971–1982	Succeeded by Frederick Meredith
