= Chris McSorley =

Canadian ice hockey coach and executive (born 1962)

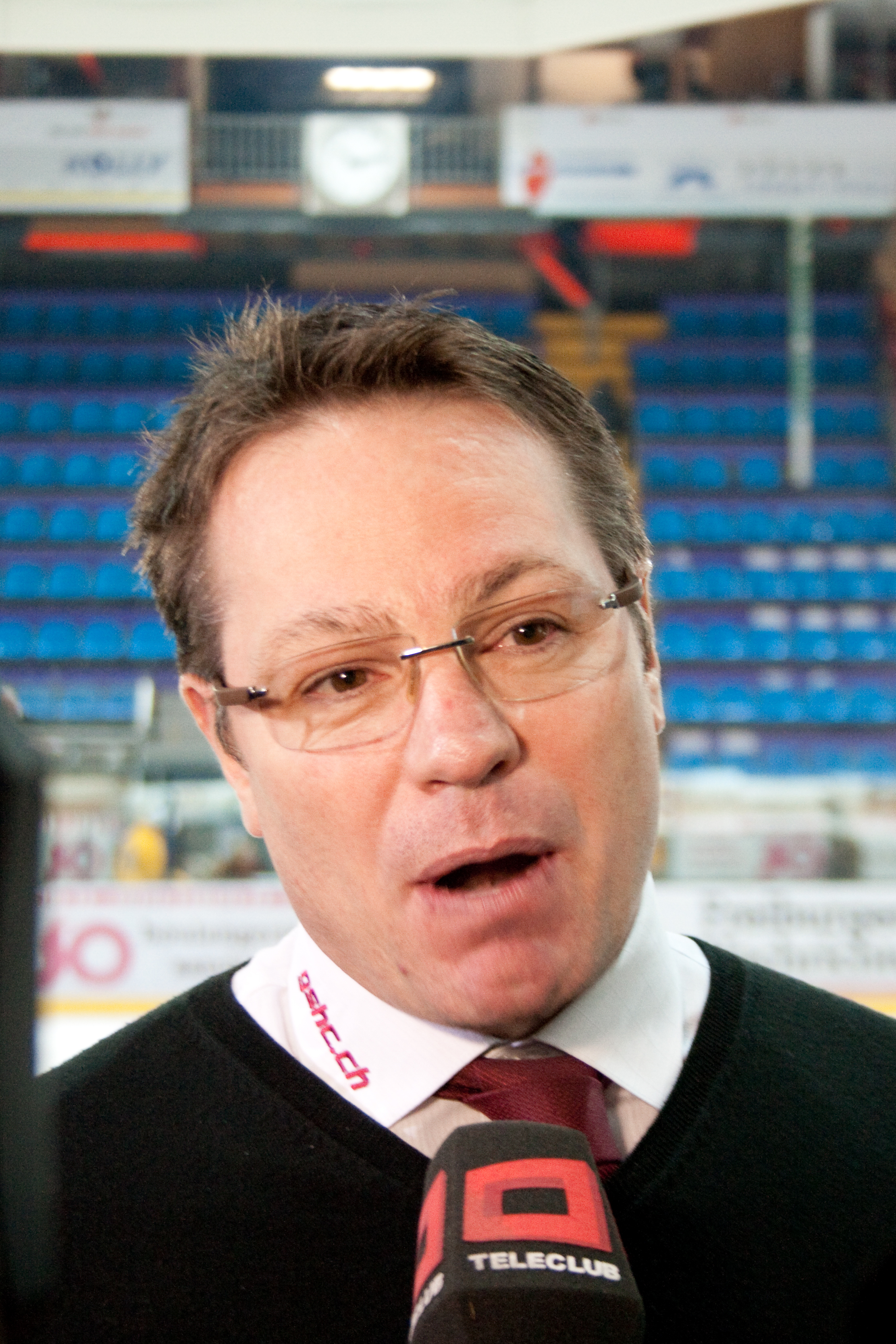
Chris McSorley in March 2010

Chris McSorley (born March 22, 1962) is a Canadian ice hockey coach and executive. He is the brother of former NHL player Marty McSorley.

He is currently the head coach of HC Sierre of the second tier, Swiss League (SL).

== Career ==
Born in Hamilton, Ontario, McSorley played professionally in minor leagues in North America, spending some time in the IHL, AHL and ECHL.

McSorley's first head coaching job came in 1989 at the Winston-Salem Thunderbirds of the East Coast Hockey League. He worked for the Richmond Renegades the following season and took over the Toledo Storm for the 1991–92 season. During his three-year tenure at the helm, he led the Storm to back-to-back ECHL championships in 1993 and 1994.

In 1994, McSorley joined the coaching staff of the IHL's Las Vegas Thunder as an assistant, and was promoted to head coach the following season. He remained in that job until the end of the 1997–98 campaign.

McSorley continued his career overseas, taking over the London Knights of the British Ice Hockey Superleague in 1999. He had immediate success, steering the Knights to the play-off championship victory and the Benson and Hedges Cup final in his first season. From 2000 to 2004, he also served as head coach of the British national team.

He left London after the 2000–01 season, in which the Knights had advanced to the finals of the IIHF Continental Cup, to accept the position as head coach and general manager at Genève-Servette HC of Switzerland. Between 2005 and 2014, he was also a part-owner of the organization. In 2002, McSorley guided the team to promotion to the Swiss top-tier National League A (NLA). McSorley led the team to the NLA finals in 2007–08, 2009–10 and to the semis in 2003–04, 2013–14, 2014–15 and 2015–16. Under his tutelage, Genève-Servette won the 2013 and 2014 Spengler Cup.

After being knocked out in the 2017 NLA quarterfinals by EV Zug, rumours were growing about him leaving Servette. On March 22, 2017, McSorley announced his retirement as head coach of Genève-Servette to focus on his duties as general manager. In early April 2018, he returned to the head coaching position, while keeping his job as general manager. In April 2019, McSorley was replaced by Patrick Emond as Servette head coach, but stayed on as general manager. On July 31, 2020, McSorley was officially relieved of his duties as GM of Servette and was replaced by Marc Gautschi.

On May 6, 2021, McSorley was named head coach of HC Lugano on a three-year deal. On October 8, 2022, he parted ways with the Lugano club. In June 2023, McSorley's company Sierre-Valais Sport SA signed a cooperation deal with Swiss League side HC Sierre. McSorley joined HC Sierre's Board of directors where he took on the role of head of sports. In April 2025, he became also head coach of HC Sierre.

=== International coaching ===
At the 2012 Spengler Cup, McSorley served as an assistant coach for Team Canada, and helped win the title.
