= Vic Batchelder =

British ice hockey journalist

- Born: 27 August 1940; Derby
- Died: 11 October 2001 (aged 61)
- Occupation: Sports Journalist
- Years active: 1980-2001
- Known for: Ice Hockey News Review

Vic Batchelder (27 August 1940 – 11 October 2001) was a British ice hockey journalist. He is a member of the British Ice Hockey Hall of Fame.

== Early life ==
Batchelder was working as a railway policeman in London when he began attending Wembley Lions games. He quit the police force after becoming disillusioned after a colleague suffered a violent attack. After quitting the police force he worked for a finance company.

== Career ==
Vic became club secretary for the Nottingham Panthers in the early 1980s. He soon started documenting and publishing information such as match reports and stories.

In September 1981 Batchelder started the ice hockey magazine, Ice Hockey News Review, as a fortnightly publication. He continued to write and edit the magazine until he sold it in September 1999 due to ill-health. However, he continued to write for the magazine until his death from cancer in 2001.

Vic Batchelder was inducted to the British Ice Hockey Hall of Fame in 2000 for his services to the sport in the United Kingdom.

In the 2003–04 season, Ice Hockey Journalists UK created the Vic Batchelder Memorial Award which is given at the end of each season to the young British player of the year.
