= Blairhall =

Town in West Fife, Scotland

Coordinates: 56.0882°N 3.6023°W

Blairhall: Scottish Gaelic: am Blàr
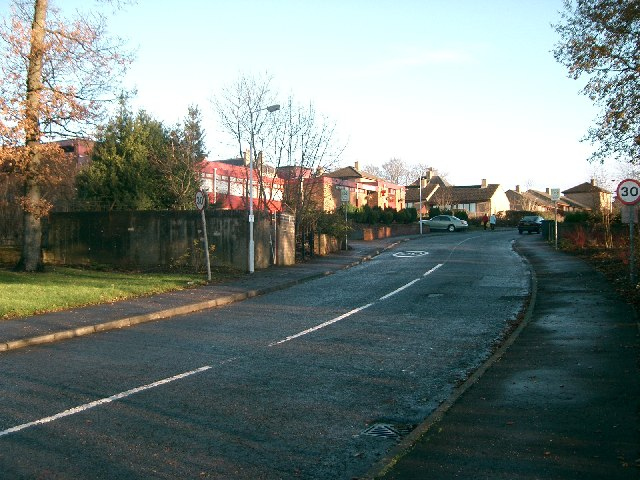
- Blairhall village

- Location within Fife
- Population: 930 (2020)
- Council area: Fife
- Country: Scotland
- Sovereign state: United Kingdom
- Police: Scotland
- Fire: Scottish
- Ambulance: Scottish

Blairhall is a town in West Fife, Scotland. It is situated 1.1 miles (1.77 km) west of Comrie, and 6.7 miles (10.783 km) west of Dunfermline.

== History ==
The town was originally a small hamlet. Blairhall was in Culross parish as an exclave of Perthshire until May 1891, when the entire parish was attached to Fifeshire. The hamlet was expanded in 1911 to house the miners from a nearby colliery. Today Blairhall has a primary school and a community leisure centre. The village has a population of around 1000 people.

Nearly 1 mile (1.6 km) to the south, beyond Shiresmill, and to the west of the Bluther Burn, stands the 17th-century laird's house of Blairhall, which was the birthplace (c.1630) of Sir William Bruce, later baronet of Balcaskie and then Kinross, and Surveyor-General to King Charles II.

In 2008, a further expansion of the village took place to the northwest, in an area called the Coo Park, which was formerly the grounds of Comrie Castle. The park was landscaped with several parkland trees, and a rigg-and-furrow system of cultivation from earlier times was evident. The house was owned by a James Anderson of Blairgowrie in the 1850s, but was demolished in the early 1960s. In the grounds there remain parkland trees, an overgrown ha-ha and the site of a curling pond.

== Education ==
Blairhall has a small primary school with approximately 60-80 pupils altogether. It was opened in 1924 as a secondary school but became a primary school in 1945 due to a lack of suitable students. Pupils from Blairhall primary continue onto Queen Anne High School in Dunfermline.

== Transport ==
=== Bus ===
Blairhall is served by Stagecoach's number 4 and 28 buses and by Bay Travel's number 4B and 4C buses.

The number 4 starts and terminates in the village on Houldsworth Street and usually operates half-hourly to Dunfermline bus station, except in the evenings and on Sundays.

The number 28 runs every three to four hours westbound to Falkirk or Alloa and eastbound to Dunfermline and Queen Margaret Hospital. It does not operate on a Sunday.

The number 4B runs at times the number 4 does not - evenings and all day Sunday.

The number 4C runs twice a day all week northbound to 'Steelend or eastbound to Dunfermline.

The village is also served by school buses which shuttle pupils to Queen Anne High School or St Columba's High School.

=== Road ===
The village is served by two roads - the A907, which passes parallel to the north, leading west to Clackmannan, Alloa and Stirling and east to Dunfermline, and the narrower B9037, which passes perpendicular to the village on the west, meeting the A907 to the north and connecting with the A985 near High Valleyfield to the south, passing through the hamlet of Shiresmill.

=== Rail ===
The village was once served by the Stirling and Dunfermline Railway through East Grange railway station but the station closed in 1958.

== Blairhall Colliery ==
In the 1870s the Carron Company began producing blackband ironstone at Blairhall Colliery, located to the south of where the village is today. The colliery was later sold to the Lochgelly Iron Company, then the Coltness Iron Company in 1883. Two new shafts were sunk between 1906 and 1911, which by 1957 were both 567 metres deep, with the downcast and pumping shaft named Lord Bruce and the upcast shaft named Lady Veronica, after the son and daughter of Edward Bruce, Earl of Elgin, respectively.

It was the presence of the colliery which led to the founding of Blairhall village - the miners required residence and in 1913 it was announced 400 new houses would be built, with the village receiving the name Blairhall.

By 1948 the colliery was producing 1,100 tons of coal and ironstone per day and 290,000 tons annually. The colliery had facilities such as baths - the first colliery baths in West Fife and the largest of their kind when built, a canteen and an ambulance room, and all electricity was generated on-site. The site was connected to the Stirling and Dunfermline Railway by a short branch.

In 1952 the National Coal Board began reconstruction of the colliery, aiming to increase daily production to 1,500 tons. This included electrification and the implementation of underground locomotives, and a new coal preparation plant and headframe were installed in 1956.

The colliery closed in 1969.

== Notable people from Blairhall ==
- Sir William Bruce, gentleman-architect
- George O'Brien former professional footballer
- George Niven, former professional footballer with Rangers F.C.
- James Syme, former ice hockey player
- Thomas Syme, former ice hockey player
- Kenny Ward (born 1963), former professional footballer
- Charlie Fleming former professional footballer for Sunderland A.F.C.
