= Bill Glennie =

Canadian ice hockey player

- Born: March 14, 1924 Portage la Prairie, Manitoba, Canada
- Died: March 11, 2005 (aged 80) Longniddry, Scotland
- Height: 6 ft 0 in (183 cm)
- Weight: 175 lb (79 kg; 12 st 7 lb)
- Position: Right wing
- Played for: Washington Lions; Harringay Greyhounds; Harringay Racers
- Playing career: 1945–1958

William John Glennie (March 14, 1924 – March 11, 2005) is a former Canadian ice hockey right winger and coach who played mainly in England. He had a long association with both of the Harringay teams in the 1940s and 1950s, scoring over 1000 points in 613 games in the UK. He was inducted into the British Ice Hockey Hall of Fame in 1951.

== Career ==
Glennie first came to England when he served with the Canadian Army during the Second World War. He was stationed in Hampshire where he met and married a local girl. After the war, Glennie returned to North America and played the 1945–46 season with the Washington Lions in the Eastern Hockey League.

In 1946, Glennie returned to England and joined the Harringay Greyhounds in the English National League. He helped them to win the playoffs in his first season and was named to the league's All Star A-team, an honour he was to receive twice more while still with the Greyhounds in 1949 and 1950. In 1951, Glennie joined the Greyhounds' sister club, the Harringay Racers, as player-coach. Guiding the team to win the newly formed British National League in the 1954–55 season, Glennie earned himself another English National League All Star A-team place in 1953–54, as well as English National League All Star B-team places in 1952 and 1953 and British National League All Star B-team places in 1956, 1957 and 1958. Glennie was also named as the coach for the British National League All Star B team in 1958.

After retiring from playing and coaching, Glennie, having impressed his employers at Harringay Stadium, was appointed an executive position with the company. He eventually went on to be the general manager of the Powderhall Stadium in Edinburgh, near where he and his wife made their permanent home in Longniddry.

== Awards and honours ==
- Named to the English National League All Star A-team in 1947, 1949, 1950 and 1954.
- Inducted to the British Ice Hockey Hall of Fame in 1951.
- Named to the English National League All Star B-team in 1952 and 1953.
- Named to the British National League All Star B-team in 1956, 1947 and 1958.
- Named as coach to the British National League All Star B-team in 1958.
