= Vic Batchelder Memorial Award =

British ice hockey award

The Vic Batchelder Memorial Award is an annual British ice hockey award made to the young British player of the year as voted for by members of Ice Hockey Journalists UK. The award was first made in 2004.

The award is named in honour of Vic Batchelder who was the editor of the now defunct Ice Hockey News Review magazine. Vic Batchelder died in 2001 at the age of 61.

== Past winners ==
Season	Winner	Team
2014-15	Zach Sullivan	Braehead Clan
2013-14	Paul Swindlehurst	
2011-12	Robert Farmer	
2008–09	Robert Dowd	Sheffield Steelers
2007–08	Mark Garside	Edinburgh Capitals
2006–07	Shaun Thompson	Bracknell Bees
2005–06	Nathan Craze	Belfast Giants
2004–05	Mark Richardson	Bracknell Bees
2003–04	Leigh Jamieson	Belfast Giants

== See also ==
- Man of Ice Awards
