= Earl Carlson =

Canadian ice hockey player

- Born: c. 1925 Kenora, Ontario, Canada
- Died: c. 1970 Darlington, England
- Height: 6 ft 1 in (185 cm)
- Weight: 168 lb (76 kg; 12 st 0 lb)
- Played for: Durham Wasps
- Playing career: 1947–1967

Earl Carlson (c. 1925 – c. 1970) was a former ice hockey player who played for the Durham Wasps. He is a member of the British Ice Hockey Hall of Fame.
