= Joe Beaton =

- Born: June 18, 1910 Stellarton, Nova Scotia, Canada
- Died: 1965 Stanmore, England
- Position: Centre
- Played for: Richmond Hawks; Harringay Greyhounds; Wembley Lions
- Playing career: 1934–1947

Joe Beaton (born June 18, 1908 in Stellarton, Nova Scotia, Canada; died 1965 in Stanmore, England) was a professional ice hockey centre who played in the English National League.

== Playing career ==
Before coming to the UK Joe Beaton played for the Charlottetown Islanders in the Maritime Senior Hockey League. In 1932–33 Beaton was named to the All-star A-team.

Beaton joined the Richmond Hawks for their inaugural season in the English National League in 1934–35. Beaton became the captain of the Hawks and led them to second place in the 1935–36 season. During this season Beaton also finished as the league's top scorer and earned himself a position on the All-star B-team.

Beaton joined the Harringay Greyhounds for the 1937–38 season, where he was again the league's top scorer and he was named to the All-star A-teams in 1937–38 and 1939–40.

Following the Second World War Beaton played one season with the Wembley Lions before he had to retire due to injury in the spring of 1947.

When he retired Beaton was the all-time leading scorer of the ENL with 308 points — 179 goals and 129 assists.

He was inducted to the British Ice Hockey Hall of Fame in 1950.

== Awards ==
- Named to the Maritime Senior Hockey League All-star A Team in 1933.
- Named to the English National League All-star B Team in 1936.
- Named to the English National League All-star A Team in 1938 and 1940
- Inducted to the British Ice Hockey Hall of Fame in 1950.
