= Alastair Brennan =

- Born: 17 February 1945 (age 81) Paisley, Scotland
- Position: Forward / Defence
- Played for: Paisley Mohawks; Ayr Bruins; Fife Flyers; Dundee Rockets
- Playing career: c. 1964–1985

Alastair Brennan (born 17 February 1945) is a retired ice hockey player who played in Scotland and for the Great Britain national ice hockey team. He is a member of the British Ice Hockey Hall of Fame.

== Career ==
Alastair Brennan first played senior hockey in the early sixties for the Paisley Mohawks. Brennan's older brother, Billy Brennan was the club's player-coach. In 1970, the Mohawks folded and Brennan went to play for the Ayr Bruins. In 1972, Brennan was involved in a car accident and suffered from a broken neck. He was told that we would not be able to play ice hockey again. Although Brennan fought his way to a full recovery he found that no coach was prepared to play him for fear of causing further injury. However, Lawrie Lovell, Fife Flyers' player-coach eventually gave Brennan a chance and he went on to play seven seasons with the club.

Brennan returned to the Bruins as player-coach in 1979. Brennan played briefly for the Dundee Rockets during the 1982–83 season where he helped the team win the league championship before returning again to the Bruins as player-coach. Brennan then stayed with the Bruins until he retired from ice hockey in 1984 following the playoffs at Wembley Arena. Brennan remained with the Bruins as an assistant coach the following season, 1984–85, even icing for the team one last time in 1985.

Brennan first appeared for the Great Britain national ice hockey team in 1965. He went on to appear for his country 102 times, competing in eight World Championships against 22 other nations.

== Awards ==
- Named to the Northern League All-star A Team in 1968–69, 1977–78, 1978–79 and 1979–80.
- Named to the Northern League All-star B Team in 1971–72, 1975–76 and 1976–77.

== Records ==
- Most appearances for the Great Britain national ice hockey team with 102.

== Career statistics ==
All British competitions				
GP	G	A	Pts	PIM
423	361	307	668	766
