= Robert Wyman (ice hockey) =

- Born: 27 April 1909; West Ham, England, United Kingdom
- Died: 25 June 1978 (aged 69)
- Position: Defence
- Shot: Left
- Played for: Grosvenor House Canadians; Wembley Canadians; Richmond Hawks; Princes; Harringay Greyhounds; Wembley Monarchs; Sussex
- National team: Great Britain
- Playing career: 1933–1950

James Robert Wyman (27 April 1909 – 25 June 1978), also known as Bob Wyman, was a British ice hockey player who played in Great Britain. He also played for the Great Britain national ice hockey team which won the gold medal at the 1936 Winter Olympics. He is a member of the British Ice Hockey Hall of Fame.

Wyman was also a successful schoolboy athlete, becoming the English schoolboy long jump champion when he was 15 years old, and speed skater, having held the British indoor half mile record and then winning the 440 yards outdoor crown in January 1934 — a feat which earned a Gallaher cigarette card. During World War II, Wyman served with the Royal Navy and reached the rank of Lieutenant-Commander.

== Career ==
=== Club ===
Having learned to play ice hockey whilst living in London in the late 1920s and early 1930s, Wyman's first season playing senior ice hockey was spent with the Grosvenor House Canadians during the 1933–34 season in the English League. The team moved to the Empire Pool at Wembley in October 1934 and changed their name to the Wembley Canadians. Wyman stayed with the Canadians for the 1934–35 and, in the newly formed English National League (ENL), 1935–36 seasons before joining the Richmond Hawks for the 1936–37 season.

Wyman joined the Princes club in the London and Provincial League for the 1937–38 season before he returned to the ENL to play with the Harringay Greyhounds during the 1939–40 season. Wyman, as defensive defenceman, recorded a personal best of two goals and three assists during the season with Harringay and Percy Nicklin, Great Britain's Coach, described him as having "an accurate and formidable body check as good as any Canadian".

After the War, Wyman returned to playing ice hockey when he joined the Wembley Monarchs during the 1946–47 season in which he only played in nine games. Wyman continued to make fewer appearances before he finally retired from ice hockey in 1950 playing with Sussex in the Southern League.

=== International ===
Olympic medal record

Men's Ice Hockey
Gold medal – first place	1936 Garmisch-Partenkirchen	Team

Wyman was first selected to play for the Great Britain national team for the 1935 World Championships held in Davos, Switzerland. Wyman scored the only goal in a win against the French team, helping the team to a bronze medal in the championships, which also earned the team a silver medal in the European Championships.

Wyman was again selected for Great Britain for the 1936 Winter Olympics when he helped the team win gold by playing in the second game when GB beat the Japanese team 3–0. Following the game, Wyman stayed at the tournament commentating for the BBC. Wyman played twice more for Great Britain at the 1938 and 1938 World Championships, winning a silver medal at the 1938 tournament and taking his total number of appearances for the team to twenty.

== Awards ==
- World Championship bronze medalist in 1935.
- Olympic gold medalist in 1936.
- World Championship silver medalist in 1938.
- Inducted to the British Ice Hockey Hall of Fame in 1993.
