= Stephen Cooper (ice hockey) =

- Born: 11 November 1966 (age 59) Durham, England, United Kingdom
- Height: 5 ft 11 in (180 cm)
- Weight: 190 lb (86 kg; 13 st 8 lb)
- Position: Defender
- Shot: Left
- Played for: Durham Wasps; Cardiff Devils; Manchester Storm; Newcastle Riverkings; Nottingham Panthers; Hull Thunder; Coventry Blaze
- National team: Great Britain
- Playing career: 1980–2002

Stephen Cooper (born 11 November 1966) is a retired British ice hockey player. He is a member of the British Ice Hockey Hall of Fame and is the older brother of fellow Hall of Fame member, Ian Cooper.

== Awards and honours ==
- Named to the BHL Premier Division All Stars second team in 1985.
- Named to the BHL British Premier Division All Stars team in 1987 and 1988.
- Named to the BHL Division 1 All Stars team in 1989.
- Awarded the Alan Weeks Trophy as best British defenceman 1989–90, 1990–91, 1991–92, 1992–93, 1993–94, 1995–96, 1997–98, 1998–99 and 1999–00
- Named to the BHL Premier Division All Stars team in 1990, 1993, 1994.
- Named World Championships Pool B Best Defenceman in 1993.
- Named to the BNL All Stars second team in 2001.
- Inducted to the British Ice Hockey Hall of Fame in 2003.

== Career statistics ==
=== Club ===
			Regular season					Playoffs				
Season	Team	League	GP	G	A	Pts	PIM	GP	G	A	Pts	PIM
1980–81	Durham Wasps	ELN	5	0	1	1	0					
1981–82	Durham Wasps	ELN	14	1	2	3	2					
1982–83	Durham Wasps	BHL 1	24	7	9	16	12	4	0	1	1	4
1983–84	Durham Wasps	BHL Prem	32	7	15	22	30	4	2	2	4	7
1984–85	Durham Wasps	BHL Prem	35	23	35	58	57	4	2	1	3	6
1985–86	Durham Wasps	BHL Prem	35	19	36	55	57	5	1	4	5	10
1986–87	Durham Wasps	BHL Prem	33	14	25	39	74	6	2	7	9	12
1987–88	Durham Wasps	BHL Prem	34	21	50	71	44	6	5	7	12	8
1988–89	Cardiff Devils	BHL 1	24	14	41	55	48					
1989–90	Cardiff Devils	BHL Prem	30	19	40	59	47	6	4	2	6	10
1990–91	Durham Wasps	BHL Prem	35	33	50	83	106	8	6	16	22	10
1991–92	Durham Wasps	BHL Prem	36	17	36	53	62	8	5	7	12	8
1992–93	Cardiff Devils	BHL Prem	35	14	51	65	40	8	4	5	9	12
1993–94	Cardiff Devils	BHL Prem	44	30	84	114	71	8	6	10	16	30
1994–95	Cardiff Devils	BHL Prem	27	12	17	29	18	7	5	5	10	2
1995–96	Cardiff Devils	BHL Prem	35	18	37	55	48	6	2	5	7	6
1996–97	Manchester Storm	ISL	33	4	7	11	20	6	0	1	1	0
1997–98	Manchester Storm	ISL	28	4	9	13	20	9	0	3	3	2
1998–99	Newcastle Riverkings	ISL	19	2	5	7	12	6	0	1	1	0
1999–00	Nottingham Panthers	ISL	42	2	8	10	22	6	0	0	0	4
2000–01	Hull Thunder	BNL	25	4	23	27	44					
2001–02	Coventry Blaze	BNL	11	5	6	11	74					
2002–03	Coventry Blaze	BNL	44	9	34	43	79	10	6	6	12	10

=== International ===
			Tournament				
Year	Team	Event	GP	G	A	Pts	PIM
1986	Great Britain	World Junior Championships Pool C	5	1	3	4	14
1989	Great Britain	World Championships Pool D	4	3	4	7	4
1990	Great Britain	World Championships Pool D					
1992	Great Britain	World Championships Pool C	5	1	4	5	4
1993	Great Britain	World Championships Pool B	7	0	4	4	6
1994	Great Britain	World Championships Pool A	6	0	1	1	4
1996	Great Britain	World Championships Pool B	7	0	3	3	6
1999	Great Britain	World Championships Pool B	7	0	0	0	2
1999	Great Britain	World Championships Pool A Qualifiers	3	1	0	1	0
2000	Great Britain	World Championships Pool B	7	2	4	6	2
