= Billy Brennan =

- Born: 13 January 1934 Paisley, Scotland
- Died: 8 March 2020 (aged 86) Paisley, Scotland
- Position: Winger / Defence
- Played for: Ayr Raiders; Paisley Pirates; Paisley Mohawks; Glasgow Dynamos
- Playing career: 1951–1973

William Patrick Brennan (13 January 1934 – 8 March 2020) was an ice hockey player who played in Scotland and for the Great Britain national ice hockey team. He is a member of the British Ice Hockey Hall of Fame.

== Career ==
=== Club ===
Brennan made his senior ice hockey debut as a 17-year-old defender for the Ayr Raiders on 21 November 1951 against the Paisley Pirates in the Canadian import dominated Scottish National League. Brennan played in ten games for the Raiders in the 1951–52 season, scoring one assist and one minor penalty, and helping them to win the league.

The following season, Brennan followed his coach, Keith Kewley, to Paisley. It was at Paisley that Kewley helped to convert Brennan into a winger and to establish himself in the team. Brennan helped Paisley to win the league in 1953–54.

When professional ice hockey collapsed in Scotland in 1960, Brennan went the amateur Paisley Mohawks in 1961 as player-coach. Brennan moulded the team into a major force of British ice hockey of the 1960s in the Northern League. Brennan introduced off-ice fitness programmes for the team in order to allow the best use of ice time for skills and tactical development. He took the team on short European tours during the 1960s, playing against teams from the Canadian Air Force. A number of the players from developed at Paisley during this time went on to achieve international recognition with the GB national team, such as his younger brother, Alastair Brennan, Billy Miller, Jackson McBride and Alistair McRae.

By 1971, Brennan was playing with the Glasgow Dynamos. He retired from ice hockey in 1973 when his employment took him to Birmingham.

=== International ===
Brennan was first selected to play for the GB national team as a winger in 1953 when he was 19 years old in Pool B of the Ice Hockey World Championships in Basle and Zurich. He went on to play for the team as a defenceman at the 1961 tournament in Switzerland, winning a silver medal. Brennan was again selected as a defenceman for the 1962 Pool A tournament in Colorado Springs in the U.S., where he also captained the team.

Brennan became the player-coach of the GB team for the 1965 and 1966 Pool B tournaments, held in Finland and Yugoslavia respectively. Brennan again appeared as player, and returned as a winger, for the GB team at the 1971 Pool C tournament.

== Retirement and death ==
Brennan retired from ice hockey in 1973 when he 39 years old and he moved to Birmingham. In 1975, he moved back to Scotland to Aberdeen to take a job as a Projects Manager with a Norwegian engineering company. He retired in 1999 as their UK Managing Director.

Brennan died in Paisley on 8 March 2020, at the age of 86.

== Awards ==
- Named as a player to the All-star B Team in 1962 and 1964.
- Named as a player to the All-star A Team in 1965, 1968 and 1969.
- Named as coach to the All-star A Team in 1965.
- Named as coach to the All-star B Team in 1968 and 1969.
- Inducted the British Ice Hockey Hall of Fame in 2004.

== Sources ==
- British Ice Hockey Hall of Fame entry
