= Frankie Green =

British ice hockey player

Personal information
- Nationality: British
- Born: 16 November 1918; Brandon, Ireland
- Died: 8 August 1974 (aged 55); Wembley, London, England

Sport
- Sport: Ice hockey

Frank Green (16 November 1918 – 8 August 1974) was a British ice hockey player. He competed for Great Britain in the men's tournament at the 1948 Winter Olympics.
