= Jack Kilpatrick =

- Born: 7 July 1917; Bootle, England, United Kingdom
- Died: 18 December 1989 (aged 72)
- Height: 5 ft 10 in (178 cm)
- Weight: 148 lb (67 kg; 10 st 8 lb)
- Position: Left wing
- Shot: Left
- Played for: Wembley Lions
- National team: Great Britain
- Playing career: 1935–1952

John Kilpatrick (7 July 1917 – 18 December 1989) was a British ice hockey player who played in the English National League (ENL). He also played for the Great Britain national ice hockey team which won the gold medal at the 1936 Winter Olympics (see Ice hockey at the 1936 Winter Olympics). He is a member of the British Ice Hockey Hall of Fame.

== Career ==
Olympic medal record

Men's Ice Hockey
| Gold medal – first place | 1936 Garmisch-Partenkirchen | Team |

Although Kilpatrick was born in Bootle near Liverpool, he learned to play ice hockey in Canada. Kilpatrick played in the 1935–36 and 1936–37 seasons for the Wembley Lions as a checking forward getting limited ice time.

At the age of just 18 years, Kilpatrick was selected to play for the GB national team in the 1936 Winter Olympics. He only played in GB's opening game against Sweden, which GB won 1–0. However, this was enough to earn him a gold medal when GB went on to win the tournament. This made Kilpatrick Britain's youngest Winter Olympic gold medallist at the time.

== Awards ==
- Olympic gold medalist in 1936.
- Inducted to the British Ice Hockey Hall of Fame in 1993.
