= Stevie Lyle =

British ice hockey player

- Born: 4 December 1979 (age 46) Cardiff, Wales
- Height: 5 ft 10 in (178 cm)
- Weight: 175 lb (79 kg; 12 st 7 lb)
- Position: Goaltender
- Caught: Left
- Played for: Cardiff Devils; Manchester Storm; Guildford Flames; Bracknell Bees; Sheffield Steelers; HC Eppan Pirates; Pingouins de Morzine-Avoriaz; Basingstoke Bison; Belfast Giants; Swindon Wildcats
- National team: Great Britain
- Playing career: 1994–2017

Stevie Lyle (born 4 December 1979 in Cardiff, Wales) is a British former professional ice hockey goaltender. Lyle started and finished his career playing for the Swindon Wildcats of the English Premier Ice Hockey League. Lyle also played at international level for the Great Britain national ice hockey team.

== Playing career ==
Lyle began his career as a teenager for his hometown Cardiff Devils. He had a brief junior career in the Ontario Hockey League for the Plymouth Whalers in 1997 before returning to Cardiff. In 2001, the Devils went bankrupt and left the British Ice Hockey Superleague, forcing Lyle to find a new club. He signed with the Manchester Storm, but in 2002, the Storm folded due to financial problems and Lyle returned to Cardiff, who were now playing in the British National League. In 2003, Lyle joined the Guildford Flames as their starting goalie. In 2004, he played two games in the Elite League (which replaced the defunct Superleague) with the Sheffield Steelers, and spent the remainder of the season in the National League with the Bracknell Bees. Lyle then had spells in Italy and France before returning to the UK in 2007 with the Basingstoke Bison, but after just 11 games with the team, he signed with the Belfast Giants as a replacement for Canadian Philippe DeRouville who was cut from the team due to poor performances. Lyle performances for the Giants earned him their player of the year award. Lyle re-signed with the Giants for the 2008–09 season along with Nathan Craze and Adam Cree, before returning home to the Cardiff Devils for the 2009–10 season on a three-year contract. After spending the 2012–13 season with the Basingstoke Bison, he joined the Swindon Wildcats as the first choice goalie. On 17 February 2015, it was announced that Lyle would replace Ryan Aldridge as Swindon's player/head coach following the conclusion of the 2014–15 season.

Lyle retired after the 2016–17 season and was inducted into the UK Ice Hockey Hall of Fame in 2018

== International career ==
Lyle also served as the starting goalie for Great Britain.
