= Johnny Oxley =

British ice hockey player

Personal information
- Nationality: British
- Born: 29 December 1922; Hastings, England
- Died: 1 June 1976 (aged 53); Brighton, England

Sport
- Sport: Ice hockey

John Arthur Oxley (29 December 1922 – 1 June 1976) was a British ice hockey player. He competed in the men's tournament at the 1948 Winter Olympics. He joined the British Ice Hockey Hall of Fame in 2008.
