= Doc Kellough =

Canadian ice hockey player

- Born: Thorold McDiarmid Kellough; 9 March 1894; Lanark, Ontario, Canada
- Died: 1957 (aged 62–63); Kensington, London, England
- Occupations: Medical doctor, ice hockey player
Ice hockey career
- Position: Defence
- Played for: Princes Ice Hockey Club (1929-1931); Grosvenor House Canadians (1931-1934); Queens Ice Hockey Club (1934-1935)

Thorold McDiarmid "Doc" Kellough (9 March 1894, Lanark—late 1957, Kensington) was a medical doctor and an early ice hockey player in the UK. He is considered a pioneer in promoting hockey and finding talent in the UK. He was inducted to the British Ice Hockey Hall of Fame in 1950.

== Career ==
Kellough was the first captain of the Grosvenor House Canadians and played in the English National League. He helped establish the Hammersmith club and played in 1929-30 in their inaugural season. In 1934, he joined the Queens Ice Hockey Club in Queensway, London before retiring from active play in 1935. From there, he organized a number of friendlies for the Queens organisation and worked as an "honorary medical officer" at Wembley Arena and Empress Hall prior to World War II. This earned him the nickname "Doc".
