= Lou Bates =

Canadian ice hockey player

- Born: July 14, 1911 Ottawa, Ontario, Canada
- Died: July 30, 1987 London, England
- Position: Defence
- Played for: Wembley Lions
- Playing career: 1934–1940

John Louis Bates (July 14, 1911 – July 30, 1987) was an ice hockey defender who played in the English National League for the Wembley Lions. He was born in Ottawa, Ontario, Canada and died in London, England. He is a member of the British Ice Hockey Hall of Fame.

== Hockey career ==
Lou Bates toured Britain twice with an all-star team from Ottawa before he spent a year in Paris, France. Bates signed for the Wembley Lions for their inaugural season in 1934. Bates established himself as one of the most popular players in pre-war Britain and, as such, featured on a cigarette card and in a cinema advert for Player's cigarettes.

Bates played as the captain for the Lions until play was stopped in May 1940 due to the outbreak of war. When play resumed following the war in 1946, Bates returned to the Lions for the 1946–47 season as coach. He also coached Streatham in 1951.

During the 1950 European championships, Bates was the Head Coach for the British team and guided them to a silver medal.

== Awards ==
- Named to the English National League All-star B-team in 1935–36.
- Named to the English National League All-star A-team in 1939–40.
- Inducted to the British Ice Hockey Hall of Fame in 1950.
