= John Murray (ice hockey, born 1923) =

British ice hockey player, coach, and administrator

- Born: January 21, 1923; Hampstead, London, England
- Died: November 18, 2017 (aged 94)
- Position: Centre
- ENL team: Wembley Lions

John Cyril Mole "Johnny" Murray (21 January 1923 – 18 November 2017) was a British professional ice hockey player, coach and administrator.

== Early life ==
Murray was born in Hampstead, London, England. He attended the Harlow Technical College.

== Career ==
Murray played for the Wembley Lions between 1939 and 1967 and also played on the national team on numerous occasions including the 1948 Winter Olympics in St Moritz. Latterly he was the national team captain and coach. After he retired from playing, Murray became a member of the British Ice Hockey Association and served on the British Olympic Committee. He was inducted into the British Ice Hockey Hall of Fame in 1996.
