= Edgar Brenchley =

- Born: 10 February 1912 Sittingbourne, England, United Kingdom
- Died: 13 March 1975 (aged 63) Hamilton, Ontario, Canada
- Height: 5 ft 9 in (175 cm)
- Weight: 148 lb (67 kg; 10 st 8 lb)
- Position: Right wing
- Shot: Right
- Played for: Hershey B'ars; Richmond Hawks; Harringay Greyhounds; Atlantic City Seagulls; Baltimore Clippers; Philadelphia Falcons; Washington Lions; New York Rovers; Johnstown Jets; Philadelphia Ramblers
- National team: Great Britain
- Playing career: 1934–1956

Edgar "Chirp" Brenchley (10 February 1912 – 13 March 1975) was a British ice hockey player who mainly played in the Eastern Amateur Hockey League (EHL). However, he is best remembered for playing for the Great Britain national ice hockey team which won the gold medal at the 1936 Winter Olympics. He is a member of the British Ice Hockey Hall of Fame.

== Career ==
Although born in Sittingbourne, England, Brenchley's family emigrated to Canada when he was a child. He learned to play ice hockey while living in Niagara Falls, Ontario.

=== Europe ===
Brenchley first played senior ice hockey in the 1934–35 season when he played for the Hershey B'ars in the EHL. The following season, 1935–36, Brenchley returned to the United Kingdom to play for the Richmond Hawks in the English National League (ENL) before going to the Harringay Greyhounds, also of the ENL, for the 1936–37 season.

=== International career ===
Medal record

Men's ice hockey

Representing Great Britain

Olympic Games
Gold medal – first place	1936 Garmisch-Partenkirchen	Team

Brenchley played for the GB national team at the 1936 Winter Olympics, where he played in all seven games and helped the team to win the gold medal. He scored the only goal of the game against Sweden as well as the game-winning goal against Canada with only 90 seconds left of the game. He again played for the GB national team at the 1937 World Championships held in London. He helped the team to silver medal in the World Championships and, as the highest place European team, the gold medal in the European Championships at the tournament.

=== Return to North America ===
Brenchley returned to North America to play for the Atlantic City Seagulls in the EHL for the 1939–40 season before it was abandoned due to the outbreak of World War II. When play resumed after the war, he played for a large number of teams in the EHL, Quebec Senior Hockey League, the American Hockey League and the International Hockey League before retiring at the end of the 1953–54 season which he had spent with the Johnstown Jets in the IHL.

=== Coaching career ===
In 1955, Brenchley became the head coach of the Philadelphia Ramblers in the EHL. He stayed with the Ramblers for three seasons – also having iced for them once in the 1955–56 season. He became the head coach for the Sudbury Wolves for the 1962–63 season. The following season, 1963–64, he joined the Port Huron Flags as head coach before joining the St. Catharines Black Hawks, now the Saginaw Spirit, for the 1964–65 season. Brenchley retired from coaching after the 1965–66 season which he had spent with the Toledo Blades

=== Retirement and after ===
Between 1967 and 1971 Brenchley served as a professional scout for the Washington Capitals, and from 1971 and 1973 he served as an assistant coach to the Pittsburgh Penguins. He scouted for the Penguins in 1974.

Brenchley was posthumously inducted into Niagara Falls Sports Wall of Fame in 1990 and the British Ice Hockey Hall of Fame in 1993.

== Awards and honours ==
- Olympic gold medalist in 1936.
- World Championship silver medalist in 1937.
- European Championship gold medalist in 1937.
- Inducted to the Niagara Falls Sports Wall of Fame in 1990.
- Inducted to the British Ice Hockey Hall of Fame in 1993.
