= Jimmy Chappell =

- Born: 3 March 1915; Huddersfield, England
- Died: 3 April 1973 (aged 58); Pinellas County, Florida, U.S.
- Height: 5 ft 9 in (175 cm)
- Weight: 160 lb (73 kg; 11 st 6 lb)
- Position: Centre
- Played for: Earls Court Rangers; Fife Flyers; Dunfermline Vikings; Brighton Tigers
- National team: Great Britain
- Playing career: 1935–1948

James William Chappell (3 March 1915 – 3 April 1973) was a British ice hockey player who played in the English National League (ENL). He is known for playing for the Great Britain national ice hockey team which won the gold medal at the 1936 Winter Olympics. He is a member of the British Ice Hockey Hall of Fame.

== Career ==
Although born in Huddersfield in England, Chappell's family emigrated to Canada when he was 10 years old. He learned to play ice hockey while living in Toronto, Ontario where he progressed through the junior ranks to play with the Oshawa Collegiates and the Whitby Intermediates between 1931 and 1934.

=== Club ===
Chappell returned to England in 1935, when he joined the Earls Court Rangers for their inaugural season in the ENL. He stayed with Earls Court for three seasons before joining the Fife Flyers in Scotland for their inaugural season in 1938–39. He again joined a club for their inaugural season when he joined the Dunfermline Vikings for the 1939–40 season. After World War II – in which he took part in the D-Day landings at Normandy – Chappell joined the Brighton Tigers for the 1946–47 season staying with them until he retired following the 1948–49 season.

=== International ===
Olympic medal record

Men's Ice Hockey
Gold medal – first place	1936 Garmisch-Partenkirchen	Team

Chappell played for the GB national team at the 1936 Winter Olympics, where he scored two goals in the six games he played and helped the team win the gold medal.

Chappell also played for the GB national team in the 1937 and 1938 World Championships. In the 1937 championships he helped the team to the silver medal and, as the highest-placed European team, the gold medal in the European Championships at the tournament. In the 1938 championships, he again helped the team to a silver medal.

In 1948, Chappell again appeared for the GB national team at the Olympics held in Switzerland when the team finished in sixth place.

== Retirement ==
After retiring from ice hockey, Chappell continued to contribute to the game for a while as a referee. He then returned with his family to Canada where he was successful in business before he died suddenly while on holiday in Pinellas County, Florida in 1976.

== Awards and honours ==
- Olympic gold medalist in 1936.
- World Championship silver medalist in 1937 and 1938.
- European Championship gold medalist in 1937.
- Inducted to the British Ice Hockey Hall of Fame in 1993.
