= John Coward (ice hockey) =

English ice hockey player

- Born: 28 August 1907; Ambleside, England, United Kingdom
- Died: 8 February 1989 (aged 81)
- Position: Left wing
- Played for: Richmond Hawks
- National team: Great Britain
- Playing career: 1929–1940

Olympic medal record

Men's Ice Hockey
Gold medal – first place	1936 Garmisch-Partenkirchen	Team

John "Red" Coward (28 August 1907 – 8 February 1989), also known as Johnny Coward, was a British ice hockey player who mainly played two seasons for the Richmond Hawks in the English National League (ENL). However, he is best remembered for playing for the Great Britain national ice hockey team which won the gold medal at the 1936 Winter Olympics. He is a member of the British Ice Hockey Hall of Fame.

== Ice hockey career ==
Although born in Ambleside in England, Coward's family emigrated to Fort Frances, Ontario where he learned to play ice hockey.

Coward returned to England in 1935 when he joined the Richmond Hawks in the ENL. Coward only played for the Hawks for two seasons. However, he also played for the GB national team at the 1936 Winter Olympics, where he scored one goal in the six games he played and helped the team to win the gold medal. He also played for the 1937 GB national team which won the silver medal at the World Championships.

Coward was inducted into the British Ice Hockey Hall of Fame in 1993. His game-worn sweater from the 1936 Winter Olympics is also an exhibit at the Hockey Hall of Fame in Toronto.

== Post ice hockey ==
During World War II Coward spent four years as an instructor with the Military Police. After the war, he returned to Fort Frances where he worked in a paper mill until 1969. After working at the paper mill, Coward ran a pro golf shop and coached minor league hockey.

== Awards and honours ==
- Olympic gold medalist in 1936.
- World Championship silver medalist in 1937.
- European Championship gold medalist in 1937.
- Inducted to the British Ice Hockey Hall of Fame in 1993.
