= Victor Hubert Tait =

Royal Air Force air marshal

Sir Victor Hubert Tait
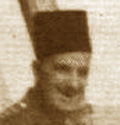
- Tait in Egyptian uniform
- Born: 8 July 1892; Winnipeg, Manitoba, Canada
- Died: 27 November 1988 (aged 96)
- Military career
- Allegiance: Canada; United Kingdom
- Branch: Canadian Expeditionary Force (c. 1915–16); British Army (1916–18); Royal Air Force (1918–46)
- Service years: 1915–1946
- Rank: Air Vice Marshal
- Commands: Egyptian Air Force
- Conflicts: First World War; Second World War
- Awards: Knight Commander of the Order of the British Empire; Companion of the Order of the Bath; Commander of the Order of the Nile (Egypt); Officer of the Legion of Merit (United States)
- Other work: President of the British Ice Hockey Association (1958–71)

Air Vice Marshal Sir Victor Hubert Tait, KBE, CB (8 July 1892 – 27 November 1988) was a Canadian-born soldier and airman who served with the Royal Canadian Engineers, the Royal Flying Corps, the Royal Air Force, and the Egyptian Air Force. He represented Great Britain at ice hockey in the 1928 Winter Olympics. In later life, he was an executive of BOAC.

== Early life ==
Tait was born in Winnipeg, Manitoba, the son of Samuel Tait, and received a Bachelor of Science degree from the University of Manitoba.

== Military career ==
With the outbreak of the First World War, Tait joined the Royal Canadian Engineers as a sapper before being commissioned into the London Regiment of the British Army in 1916. He was seconded to the Royal Flying Corps, where he focussed on radio and aerial navigation. Transferring to the new Royal Air Force (RAF) in 1918, he was an instructor at the RAF's Electrical and Wireless School in 1919. After a period of illness Tait served with No. 4 Squadron in Constantinople from 1922 to 1924 as a pilot and wireless specialist. On his return to the United Kingdom, Tait was appointed to signals staff officer duties.

By 1930 Tait was back in the Middle East where he continued his work in RAF signals. In 1932 Tait was made the Senior Air Advisor on the British Military Mission in Egypt. At the same time or not long afterward he was seconded to the Egyptian Army Air Force which he effectively founded, flying eight aircraft to Cario. The Egyptian monarch, King Fuad, was impressed with Tait and granted him the rank of kaimachan (lieutenant colonel) and, in 1937, King Farouk made him a Commander of the Order of the Nile. In 1937 the Egyptian Army Air Force was transferred from British to Egyptian control and the last British Sirdar, Major General Sir Charlton Spinks instructed Tait to relinquish his position. Tait responded by stating that he now only took orders from the Egyptian minister of war and after a meeting with the minister was convened, Tait was made air advisor to the EAAF (a position created especially for him) and promoted to group captain.

Returning to the RAF during the Second World War, Tait transferred to the RAF's Technical Branch in 1940 and was promoted to air commodore. After a spell as deputy director of signals, he was appointed the director of radio in 1941, the director of RDF in 1942, when he was promoted to air vice marshal. In August 1942 Tait was made Director-General of Signals, a post he until he retired from the Air Force in 1946. During the preparations for the D-Day landing and the invasion of Normandy, Tait was responsible for planning the attack on German radar stations and spoofing other radar.

After the war Tait joined the British Overseas Airways Corporation, working as its operations director from 1945 to 1956.

== Sportsman ==
Tait represented Great Britain at ice hockey and competed in the 1928 Winter Olympics, the British team finishing fourth in the Olympic ice hockey tournament of 1928.

Tait was president of the British Ice Hockey Association from 1958 to 1971.

Military offices
New title Egyptian Air Force established	Commander of the Egyptian Air Force; 1932–1936	Unknown
Preceded by Charles Nutting	Director-General of Signals; 1942–1945	Succeeded by William Theak
Sporting positions
Preceded by Philip Vassar Hunter	President of the British Ice Hockey Association; 1958–1971	Succeeded by Bunny Ahearne
