= Gordon Dailley =

Canadian-born British ice hockey player (1911–1989)

Olympic medal record

Men's Ice Hockey
| Gold medal – first place | 1936 Garmisch-Partenkirchen | Team |

Gordon Debenham "Don" Dailley, CD (July 24, 1911 – May 3, 1989) was a Canadian-born British ice hockey player who was notable for his achievements while representing Great Britain at international ice hockey competitions. After his hockey career, he had a successful military career, participating in World War II and the Korean War.

== Hockey career ==
Born in Winnipeg, Manitoba, Dailley attended St. John’s College and the University of Manitoba. Dailley moved to England in 1933, reportedly earning his passage across the Atlantic Ocean by working on a cattle boat. Upon his arrival in England, Dailley joined the Grosvenor House Canadians (later the Wembley Canadians), playing defense. Dailley later played for the Wembley Lions, and was captain of the Wembley Monarchs from 1937 until the outbreak of World War II.

== International championships ==
Dailley was a member of the team which won the gold medal in ice hockey for Great Britain at the 1936 Winter Olympics. The team consisted mostly of British-born Canadian citizens, as well as Dailley, whose only justification for playing for Britain lay in his long residency in England. Two players (including Jimmy Foster) hadn't even received the proper papers to allow them to play for Great Britain. (The Canadian Olympic Committee launched a formal protest, which was defeated.) The gold in 1936 was the only ice hockey gold for Great Britain.

Dailley continued to play for the British national team, and was named its captain upon the resignation of Carl Erhardt in 1937. He led the team to European Championships in 1937 and 1938, after which he left hockey to join the Canadian Army.

== Military service ==
Dailley served in England throughout World War II. After the war, he remained in the Canadian Forces, holding various posts in Ottawa. He participated in the United Nations peacekeeping force in Korea, and was promoted to colonel in 1955. He was the military attaché for Canada in Belgrade, Yugoslavia from 1955 to 1960, after which he became the base commander at CFB Gagetown, New Brunswick. He retired from the military in 1964.

== Post-military life ==
Dailley was prominent in the New Brunswick community after his retirement from the Canadian Forces. He formulated plans for the African Lion Safari, the first game farm in Canada to feature exotic species in a drive-through reserve. He was also involved in the United Nations Association, OXFAM, the New Brunswick Symphony, Attractions Ontario and the Canadian Association of Zoological Parks and Aquariums. He was posthumously inducted in the British Ice Hockey Hall of Fame in 1993.

== See also ==
Ice hockey at the 1936 Winter Olympics Gordon Dailley also started the African Lion Safari and was inducted to the Cambridge Hall of Fame.
