= Jimmy Borland =

- Born: 25 March 1910 Manchester, England, GBR
- Died: 31 January 1970 (aged 59) Montreal, Quebec, Canada
- Position: Defence
- Shot: Right
- Played for: Grosvenor House Canadians; Brighton Tigers
- National team: Great Britain
- Playing career: 1933–1937

James Andrew Borland (25 March 1910 – 31 January 1970), known as Jimmy Borland or Jim Borland, was an ice hockey player who played in the English League, the English National League and for the British national ice hockey team.

== Playing career ==
Medal record

Men's ice hockey

Representing Great Britain

Olympic Games
| Gold medal – first place | 1936 Garmisch-Partenkirchen | Team |

Although born in Manchester, England, Jimmy Borland's family had emigrated to Canada and he learned to play ice hockey in Montreal.

Borland returned to the United Kingdom in 1933 when he joined the Grosvenor House Canadians where he helped the team to win the English League in 1933–34. In 1934 he was selected to play for the Great Britain national ice hockey team for the World Championships which were held in Milan that year. The GB team went on to finish eighth in the competition with Borland scoring two goals.

Following a year off from playing, Borland returned to play for the Brighton Tigers in the 1935–36 season as the team captain. Borland again played for the GB national team in 1936, this time at the Winter Olympics. Borland played in three games during the tournament helping the team to win gold medal. Borland played for the Brighton Tigers again during the 1936–37 season before retiring from hockey.

== Awards ==
- Olympic gold medalist in 1936.
