= Percy Nicklin =

Canadian-British ice hockey coach

- Born: 9 May 1893 Simcoe, Ontario, Canada
- Died: 1973 (aged 79–80) London, England
- Coached for: Moncton Hawks; Richmond Hawks; Harringay Racers; Harringay Greyhounds; British national ice hockey team

Percy Harold Nicklin (9 May 1893 – 1973) was a Canadian-British ice hockey coach who is best known for putting together and coaching the Great Britain national ice hockey team that won gold at the 1936 Winter Olympics.

== Biography ==
Nicklin was born into a Scottish family in Simcoe, Ontario in 1893. He had had a successful coaching career in Canada with the Moncton Hawks, leading them to Allan Cup victories in 1933 and 1934. In 1935 he moved to England where he coached for Richmond Hawks before taking up coaching duties for both Harringay Racers and Harringay Greyhounds.

In 1936, Nicklin, together with J.F. Ahearne, put together a Great Britain national team from players who had learned the game in Canada but who were qualified by birth to play for Great Britain. The team managed to win the gold medal, beating Nicklin's home nation, favourites Canada, along the way. Introducing more British players, Nicklin coached Great Britain to two European Championship titles in 1937 and 1938.

He died in London in 1973.
