= Carl Erhardt =

English ice hockey player

Carl Alfred Erhardt (15 February 1897 – 3 May 1988) was an English ice hockey player who was born in Beckenham, Kent. He captained the British national team to numerous international championships in the 1930s, including a gold medal at the 1936 Winter Olympics in Garmisch-Partenkirchen. Erhardt was elected to the British Ice Hockey Hall of Fame in 1950 and was posthumously elected to the International Ice Hockey Federation Hall of Fame in 1998.

== Early years ==
Unlike most British hockey players of the era, Erhardt did not grow up in Canada. Rather, he learned the game of hockey while attending school in Germany and Switzerland as a boy. Erhardt was a passionate defenseman, sometimes playing over 40 minutes each game. An excellent athlete, Erhardt also excelled at tennis, skiing and water-skiing, and founded the British Water Ski Federation.

== National team success ==
Olympic medal record

Men's Ice Hockey
Gold medal – first place	1936 Garmisch-Partenkirchen	Team

Erhardt was a member of the European and World Championship teams in 1931, the World Championship team in 1934 and 1935, and the captain of the team that won the European and World Championships, along with Olympic gold, in 1936. Of the twelve members of the 1936 team, Erhardt was one of only two who had not either been born or learned the game in Canada. Thirty-nine years old at the time, Erhardt is the oldest man ever to win an Olympic gold in ice hockey. The British defeated the prohibitive favourites, the Canadians, in capturing Great Britain's first and only gold medal in ice hockey.

== Later life and honors ==
After his Olympic success, Erhardt retired from hockey. He wrote a book in 1937 titled Ice Hockey, became a referee, and joined the council of the British Ice Hockey Association, of which he became a lifetime vice-president. Erhardt was elected to the British Ice Hockey Hall of Fame in 1950, and was posthumously elected to the International Ice Hockey Federation Hall of Fame in 1998. In 2012, the UK Elite Ice Hockey League (EIHL) named one of its two newly introduced conferences after him.

== See also ==
- Ice hockey at the 1936 Winter Olympics
