= Ice Hockey UK =

Ice hockey governing body

Great Britain
- Association name: Ice Hockey UK
- IIHF Code: GBR
- IIHF membership: 19 November 1908
- IIHF men's ranking: 18 (▼2) (3 June 2026)
- IIHF women's ranking: 19 (▲1) (21 April 2025)

Ice Hockey UK (IHUK) is the national governing body of ice hockey in the United Kingdom. Affiliated to the International Ice Hockey Federation (IIHF), IHUK is the internationally recognised umbrella body in the United Kingdom. IHUK was created to replace the British Ice Hockey Association (BIHA). The organisation is responsible to the IIHF for the good order of the sport in the UK. The IHUK is charged with ensuring that all overseas players are properly cleared to play and that the rules and by-laws of the IIHF are upheld. Ice Hockey UK runs the men's (Great Britain men's national ice hockey team) and women's senior, and Under 20 and Under 18, national teams. Ice Hockey UK founded a youth development league in 2014, with the aim to grow future national team players.

== History ==
The BIHA was founded in 1913 and operated during the 1913–14 season and between 1923 and 1999. The founding ice hockey clubs were Cambridge University, Manchester, Oxford Canadians, Princes and Royal Engineers.

In 1939, the BIHA negotiated an agreement with W. G. Hardy of the Canadian Amateur Hockey Association to regulate the import of players from Canada. In 1940, the BIHA was invited to join the International Ice Hockey Association which was founded during World War II to promote the game of hockey among the United Kingdom, Canada and the United States. In 2018, Ice Hockey UK began running the British Ice Hockey Hall of Fame.

On 30 June 2026, Ice Hockey UK merged with the Scottish Ice Hockey and England Ice Hockey.

== National teams ==
- Great Britain men's national ice hockey team
- Great Britain men's national U20 ice hockey team
- Great Britain men's national U18 ice hockey team
- Great Britain women's national ice hockey team
- Great Britain women's national U18 ice hockey team

== Notable people ==
In 2021 Clifton Wrottesley was appointed Chair of Ice Hockey UK.

Presidents

- Peter Patton (1913–1934)
- Philip Vassar Hunter (1934–1958)
- Victor Hubert Tait (1958–1971)
- Bunny Ahearne (1971–1982)
- Frederick Meredith (1982–1998)
- John Fisher (1998–1999)
- Bob Wilkinson (1999–2017)
- Richard Grieveson (2017-2021)
- Clifton Wrottesley (2021-

Secretaries

- Bunny Ahearne (1934–1972)
- Ernie Leacock (assistant secretary c. 1950s)
- Pat Marsh (1972–1987)
- Andy French (2009-)
