= Great Britain men's national ice hockey team =

Men's national ice hockey team representing the UK

Great Britain
- Nickname: Team GB
- Association: Ice Hockey UK
- General manager: Andy Buxton
- Head coach: Peter Russell
- Assistants: Corey Neilson; Chuck Weber
- Captain: Robert Dowd
- Most games: Mark Richardson (139)
- Top scorer: Gerry David (43)
- Most points: Tony Hand (122)
- Team colors
- IIHF code: GBR
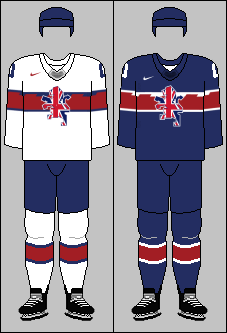

Ranking
- Current IIHF: 18 ▼2 (3 June 2026)
- Highest IIHF: 16 (2021)
- Lowest IIHF: 31 (2006)

First international
- Great Britain 3–0 Switzerland (Chamonix, France; 23 January 1909)

Biggest win
- Great Britain 26–0 New Zealand (Geel, Belgium; 16 March 1989)

Biggest defeat
- Yugoslavia 21–1 Great Britain (Barcelona, Spain; 25 March 1979)

Olympics
- Appearances: 4 (first in 1924)
- Medals: (gold) Gold: (1936); (bronze) Bronze: (1924)

IIHF World Championships
- Appearances: 59 (first in 1930)
- Best result: (gold) Gold: (1936)

European Championships
- Appearances: 3 (first in 1910)
- Best result: (gold) Gold: (1910)

International record (W–L–T)
- 242–268–38

Great Britain men's national ice hockey team
Medal record

Olympic Games
Gold medal – first place	1936 Germany	Team
Bronze medal – third place	1924 France	Team

World Championship
Gold medal – first place	1936 Germany	Team
Silver medal – second place	1937 Great Britain	
Silver medal – second place	1938 Czechoslovakia	
Bronze medal – third place	1924 France	Team
Bronze medal – third place	1935 Switzerland	

European Championships
Gold medal – first place	1910 Switzerland	

The Great Britain men's national ice hockey team (also known as Team GB) is the national ice hockey team that represents the United Kingdom. A founding member of the International Ice Hockey Federation (IIHF) in 1908, the team is controlled by Ice Hockey UK.

== History ==
The team was a force on the international scene in the early 20th century, winning the first ever IIHF European Championship in 1910, finishing as bronze medalists at the 1924 Winter Olympics in Chamonix, France, and becoming Olympic champions in 1936 in Garmisch-Partenkirchen, Germany. The gold medal-winning Olympic team was composed primarily of dual-national British Canadians, many of whom having learned and played the game in Canada. However, since then the national team has made little impact on the sport. Until they surprisingly qualified for the 2019 installment of the tournament, their last appearance in the top-level World Championship came in 1994. Great Britain last qualified for the Olympics in 1948.

== Tournament record ==
=== Olympic Games ===
Games	GP	W	OW	T	OL	L	GF	GA	Coach	Captain	Finish	Rank
(France) 1924 Chamonix	5	3	0	0	0	2	40	38	Guy Clarkson	Guy Clarkson	Final Round	Bronze
(Switzerland) 1928 St. Moritz	6	2	0	0	0	4	11	27	Victor Tait	Victor Tait	First round	4th place
(United States) 1932 Lake Placid	did not participate											
(Nazi Germany) 1936 Garmisch-Partenkirchen	7	5	0	2	0	0	17	3	Percy Nicklin	Carl Erhardt	Final Round	Gold
(Switzerland) 1948 St. Moritz	8	3	0	0	0	5	39	47	Carl Erhardt	Archie Stinchcombe	Round-robin	5th place

Year	Result			
1924	Bronze			
1928	4th place			
1936	Gold			
1948	5th place			
Totals
Games	Gold	Silver	Bronze	Total
4	1	0	1	2

=== World Championships ===
Note: Between 1920 and 1968, the Olympic ice hockey tournament was also considered the World Championship for that year.
Note: World War II forced cancellation of all tournaments from 1940 to 1946.
Note: In 1972, a separate tournament was held both for the World Championships and the Winter Olympics for the first time.
Note: No World Championships were held during the Olympic years 1980, 1984, and 1988.
Note: the 2020 tournament was cancelled due to the COVID-19 pandemic.

Championship	Coach	Captain	Division	Rank
1920	did not participate			
(France) 1924 Chamonix	George Elliot Clarkson	?	Top Division	Bronze
(Switzerland) 1928 St. Moritz	?	?	Top Division	4th place
(France) / (Germany) / (Austria) 1930 Chamonix, Berlin, Vienna	?	William Home	Top Division	tied 10th place
(Poland) 1931 Krynica-Zdrój	Clarence Wedgewood	John Magwood	Top Division	8th place
1932	did not participate			
1933	did not participate			
(Italy) 1934 Milan	John Magwood	Carl Erhardt	Top Division	8th place
(Switzerland) 1935 Davos	Bunny Ahearne	Carl Erhardt	Top Division	Bronze
(Nazi Germany) 1936 Garmisch-Partenkirchen	Percy Nicklin	Carl Erhardt	Top Division	Gold
(United Kingdom) 1937 London	Percy Nicklin	Gordon Dailley	Top Division	Silver
(Czechoslovakia) 1938 Prague	Percy Nicklin	Gordon Dailley	Top Division	Silver
(Switzerland) 1939 Zürich, Basel	Percy Nicklin	Gordon Dailley	Top Division	8th place
1940–1946	Competitions not held because of World War II			
1947	did not participate			
(Switzerland) 1948 St. Moritz	Carl Erhardt	?	Top Division	5th place
1949	did not participate			
(United Kingdom) 1950 London	Lou Bates	Ken Nicholson	Top Division	4th place
(France) 1951 Paris	James Mowat	Ken Nicholson	Top Division	5th place
(Belgium) 1952 Liège	Johnny Murray	Johnny Murray	Pool B	10th place (1st in the "B" pool)
(Switzerland) 1953 Zürich, Basel	Johnny Murray	Laurie Spence	Pool B	5th place (2nd in the "B" pool)
1954	did not participate			
1955	did not participate			
1956	did not participate			
1957	did not participate			
1958	did not participate			
1959	did not participate			
1960	did not participate			
(Switzerland) 1961 Geneva, Lausanne	Johnny Carlyle	Johnny Murray	Pool B	10th place (2nd in the "B" pool, promoted)
(United States) 1962 Colorado Springs, Denver	Johnny Murray	Billy Brennan	Top Division	8th place, relegated
(Sweden) 1963 Stockholm	Malcolm Beaton	Bert Smith	Pool B	15th place (7th in the "B" pool)
1964	did not participate			
(Finland) 1965 Turku, Rauma, Pori	Billy Brennan	Marshall Key	Pool B	14th place (6th in the "B" pool)
(Socialist Federal Republic of Yugoslavia) 1966 Zagreb	Billy Brennan	Billy Brennan	Pool B	16th place (8th in the "B" pool, relegated)
1967	did not participate			
1968	did not participate			
1969	did not participate			
1970	did not participate			
(Netherlands) 1971 Nijmegen, Utrecht, Eindhoven, Tilburg, Rotterdam, Geleen, Den Bosch, Groningen, Heerenveen	Johnny Carlyle	Robert Stevenson	Pool C	18th place (4th in the "C" pool)
1972	did not participate			
(Netherlands) 1973 Geleen, Rotterdam, Nijmegen, Utrecht, Tilburg, The Hague	Ellis Firestone	Terry Matthews	Pool C	22nd place (8th in the "C" pool)
1974	did not participate			
1975	did not participate			
(Poland) 1976 Gdańsk	George Beach	?	Pool C	21st place (5th in the "C" pool)
(Denmark) 1977 Copenhagen, Hørsholm	Terry Matthews	?	Pool C	24th place (7th in the "C" pool)
1978	did not participate			
(Spain) 1979 Barcelona	Joe McIntosh	Alastair Brennan	Pool C	23rd place (5th in the "C" pool)
(China) 1981 Beijing	Alex Dampier	?	Pool C	24th place (8th in the "C" pool, relegated)
1982	did not participate			
1983	did not participate			
1985	did not participate			
1986	did not participate			
1987	did not participate			
(Belgium) 1989 Geel, Heist-op-den-Berg	Terry Matthews	Stephen Cooper	Pool D	27th place (3rd in the "D" pool)
(United Kingdom) 1990 Cardiff	Alex Dampier	Chris Kelland	Pool D	26th place (1st in the "D" pool, promoted)
(Denmark) 1991 Brøndby	Alex Dampier	Chris Kelland	Pool C	21st place (5th in the "C" pool)
(United Kingdom) 1992 Kingston upon Hull	Alex Dampier	Chris Kelland	Pool C	21st place (1st in the "C" pool, promoted)
(Netherlands) 1993 Eindhoven	Alex Dampier	Chris Kelland	Pool B	13th place (1st in the "B" pool, promoted)
(Italy) 1994 Bolzano, Canazei, Milan	Alex Dampier	Chris Kelland	Top Division	12th place, relegated
(Slovakia) 1995 Bratislava	Jiří Petrnoušek	Shannon Hope	Pool B	19th place (7th in the "B" pool)
(Netherlands) 1996 Eindhoven	Peter Woods	Shannon Hope	Pool B	16th place (4th in the "B" pool)
(Poland) 1997 Katowice, Sosnowiec	Peter Woods	Shannon Hope	Pool B	18th place (6th in the "B" pool)
(Slovenia) 1998 Ljubljana, Jesenice	Peter Woods	Shannon Hope	Pool B	22nd place (6th in the "B" pool)
(Denmark) 1999 Odense, Rødovre	Peter Woods	Steve Moria	Pool B	18th place (2nd in the "B" pool)
(Poland) 2000 Katowice, Kraków	Peter Woods	Steve Moria	Pool B	19th place (3rd in the "B" pool)
(Slovenia) 2001 Ljubljana	Chris McSorley	David Longstaff	Division I	19th place (2nd in Division I, Group B)
(Hungary) 2002 Székesfehérvár, Dunaújváros	Chris McSorley	David Longstaff	Division I	23rd place (4th in Division I, Group B)
(Croatia) 2003 Zagreb	Chris McSorley	David Longstaff	Division I	25th place (5th in Division I, Group B)
(Norway) 2004 Oslo	Chris McSorley	Steve Thornton	Division I	25th place (5th in Division I, Group A)
(Hungary) 2005 Debrecen	Rick Strachan	Ashley Tait	Division I	24th place (4th in Division I, Group A)
(France) 2006 Amiens	Rick Strachan	Jonathan Weaver	Division I	26th place (5th in Division I, Group A)
(Slovenia) 2007 Ljubljana	Paul Thompson	Jonathan Weaver	Division I	24th place (4th in Division I, Group B)
(Austria) 2008 Innsbruck	Paul Thompson	Jonathan Weaver	Division I	23rd place (4th in Division I, Group A)
(Poland) 2009 Toruń	Paul Thompson	Jonathan Weaver	Division I	22nd place (3rd in Division I, Group B)
(Slovenia) 2010 Ljubljana	Paul Thompson	Jonathan Weaver	Division I	23rd place (4th in Division I, Group B)
(Ukraine) 2011 Kyiv	Paul Thompson	Jonathan Weaver	Division I	20th place (2nd in Division I, Group B)
(Slovenia) 2012 Ljubljana	Tony Hand	Jonathan Phillips	Division I	21st place (5th in Division I, Group A)
(Hungary) 2013 Budapest	Tony Hand	Jonathan Phillips	Division I	22nd place (6th in Division I, Group A, relegated)
(Lithuania) 2014 Vilnius	Doug Christiansen	Jonathan Phillips	Division I	26th place (4th in Division I, Group B)
(Netherlands) 2015 Eindhoven	Peter Russell	Jonathan Phillips	Division I	24th place (2nd in Division I, Group B)
(Croatia) 2016 Zagreb	Peter Russell	Jonathan Phillips	Division I	24th place (2nd in Division I, Group B)
(United Kingdom) 2017 Belfast	Peter Russell	Jonathan Phillips	Division I	23rd place (1st in Division I, Group B, promoted)
(Hungary) 2018 Budapest	Peter Russell	Jonathan Phillips	Division I	17th place (1st in Division I, Group A, promoted)
(Slovakia) 2019 Bratislava, Košice	Peter Russell	Jonathan Phillips	Top Division	13th place
(Switzerland) 2020 Zürich, Lausanne	Cancelled due to the COVID-19 pandemic			
(Latvia) 2021 Riga	Corey Neilson	Jonathan Phillips	Top Division	14th place
(Finland) 2022 Tampere, Helsinki	Peter Russell	Jonathan Phillips	Top Division	16th place, relegated
(United Kingdom) 2023 Nottingham	Peter Russell	Jonathan Phillips	Division I	17th place (1st in Division I, Group A, promoted)
(Czech Republic) 2024 Prague, Ostrava	Peter Russell	Robert Dowd	Top Division	15th place, relegated
(Romania) 2025 Sfântu Gheorghe	Peter Russell	Robert Dowd	Division I	17th place (1st in Division I, Group A, promoted)
(Switzerland) 2026 Zurich, Fribourg	Peter Russell	Robert Dowd	Top Division	16th place, relegated
(Estonia) 2027 Tallinn			Division I	(Division I, Group A)

=== European Championships ===
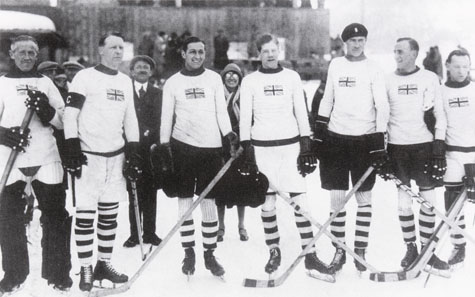
Great Britain ice hockey team at the European Championships in Davos, Switzerland, 1926

==== Standalone tournaments ====
Games	GP	W	T	L	GF	GA	Coach	Captain	Finish	Rank
(Switzerland) 1910 Les Avants	3	2	1	0	7	2	?	?	Round-robin	Gold
(German Empire) 1911 Berlin	did not participate									
(Austria-Hungary) 1912 Prague*	did not participate									
(German Empire) 1913 Munich	did not participate									
(German Empire) 1914 Berlin	did not participate									
1915–1920	No Championships (World War I).									
(Sweden) 1921 Stockholm	did not participate									
(Switzerland) 1922 St. Moritz	did not participate									
(Belgium) 1923 Antwerp	did not participate									
(Italy) 1924 Milan	did not participate									
(Czechoslovakia) 1925 Štrbské Pleso, Starý Smokovec	did not participate									
(Switzerland) 1926 Davos	7	3	0	4	26	19	?	?	Third round	4th place
(Austria) 1927 Wien	did not participate									
(Hungary) 1929 Budapest	did not participate									
(Germany) 1932 Berlin	4	2	1	1	10	9	?	?	Consolation round	7th place

==== European Championship results from combined events ====
Year	Coach	Captain	Rank
1928	?	?	Bronze
1930	?	William Home	tied 8th place
1931	Clarence Wedgewood	John Magwood	7th place
1934	John Magwood	Carl Erhardt	6th place
1935	Bunny Ahearne	Carl Erhardt	Silver
1936	Percy Nicklin	Carl Erhardt	Gold
1937	Percy Nicklin	Gordon Dailley	Gold
1938	Percy Nicklin	Gordon Dailley	Gold
1939	Percy Nicklin	Gordon Dailley	6th place
1948	Carl Erhardt	?	4th place
1950	Lou Bates	Ken Nicholson	Silver
1951	James Mowat	Ken Nicholson	4th place
1962	Johnny Murray	Billy Brennan	6th place

== Current roster ==
Roster for the 2026 IIHF World Championship.

Head coach: Peter Russell

No.	Pos.	Name	Height	Weight	Birthdate	Team
3	D	Liam Steele	1.93 m (6 ft 4 in)	102 kg (225 lb)	21 April 2004 (age 22)	(England) Sheffield Steeldogs
5	F	Ben Davies	1.73 m (5 ft 8 in)	81 kg (179 lb)	18 January 1991 (age 35)	(Wales) Cardiff Devils
7	F	Robert Lachowicz	1.78 m (5 ft 10 in)	80 kg (180 lb)	8 February 1990 (age 36)	(Scotland) Glasgow Clan
8	D	Bradley Jenion	1.95 m (6 ft 5 in)	100 kg (220 lb)	24 January 1998 (age 28)	(England) Manchester Storm
9	F	Brett Perlini	1.88 m (6 ft 2 in)	91 kg (201 lb)	14 June 1990 (age 36)	(Wales) Cardiff Devils
14	F	Liam Kirk – A	1.82 m (6 ft 0 in)	72 kg (159 lb)	3 January 2000 (age 26)	(Germany) Eisbären Berlin
15	F	Jack Hopkins	1.81 m (5 ft 11 in)	78 kg (172 lb)	8 May 2004 (age 22)	(England) Coventry Blaze
17	D	Mark Richardson – A	1.83 m (6 ft 0 in)	88 kg (194 lb)	3 October 1986 (age 39)	(Wales) Cardiff Devils
18	F	Sam Lyne	1.88 m (6 ft 2 in)	93 kg (205 lb)	7 April 2005 (age 21)	(Canada) Cranbrook Bucks
20	G	Mat Robson	1.91 m (6 ft 3 in)	86 kg (190 lb)	26 March 1996 (age 30)	(England) Coventry Blaze
24	D	Josh Tetlow	1.98 m (6 ft 6 in)	103 kg (227 lb)	12 January 1998 (age 28)	(England) Nottingham Panthers
27	F	Cole Shudra	1.88 m (6 ft 2 in)	95 kg (209 lb)	11 August 1998 (age 28)	(England) Sheffield Steelers
33	G	Ben Bowns	1.83 m (6 ft 0 in)	81 kg (179 lb)	21 January 1991 (age 35)	(Wales) Cardiff Devils
35	G	Lucas Brine	1.85 m (6 ft 1 in)	77 kg (170 lb)	9 August 2002 (age 24)	(Scotland) Glasgow Clan
48	F	Johnny Curran	1.78 m (5 ft 10 in)	79 kg (174 lb)	14 March 1995 (age 31)	(Scotland) Dundee Stars
58	D	David Clements	1.85 m (6 ft 1 in)	84 kg (185 lb)	20 September 1994 (age 32)	(England) Coventry Blaze
61	F	Logan Neilson	1.95 m (6 ft 5 in)	90 kg (200 lb)	29 January 2003 (age 23)	(Scotland) Fife Flyers
73	D	Joseph Hazeldine	1.85 m (6 ft 1 in)	80 kg (180 lb)	7 March 2001 (age 25)	(Scotland) Glasgow Clan
74	F	Ollie Betteridge	1.80 m (5 ft 11 in)	80 kg (180 lb)	16 January 1996 (age 30)	(England) Nottingham Panthers
75	F	Robert Dowd – C	1.78 m (5 ft 10 in)	80 kg (180 lb)	26 May 1988 (age 38)	(England) Sheffield Steelers
77	F	Bayley Harewood	1.83 m (6 ft 0 in)	77 kg (170 lb)	7 July 2003 (age 23)	(Wales) Cardiff Devils
79	D	Nathanael Halbert	1.83 m (6 ft 0 in)	88 kg (194 lb)	30 September 1995 (age 30)	(Slovenia) HK Olimpija
84	D	Travis Brown	1.88 m (6 ft 2 in)	89 kg (196 lb)	15 March 1994 (age 32)	(England) Guildford Flames
92	F	Joshua Waller	1.78 m (5 ft 10 in)	73 kg (161 lb)	2 June 1999 (age 27)	(England) Guildford Flames
94	F	Cade Neilson	1.83 m (6 ft 0 in)	88 kg (194 lb)	15 May 2001 (age 25)	(Scotland) Glasgow Clan

== Uniform evolution ==
National team jerseys

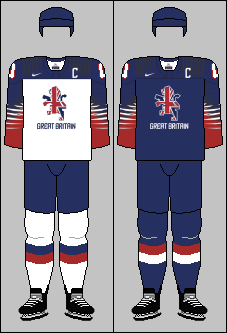
2019–2021

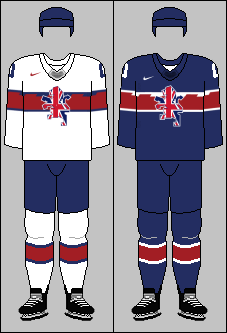
2022–

== All-time record ==
As of 27 May 2026.

Opponent	Played	Won	Drawn	Lost	GF	GA	GD
Australia	4	4	0	0	42	8	+34
Austria	22	6	2	14	63	108	-45
Belarus	6	2	0	4	17	32	-15
Belgium	23	19	1	3	188	54	+134
Bulgaria	8	1	1	6	36	47	-11
Canada	20	3	0	17	25	161	-136
China	8	5	0	3	62	30	+32
Croatia	9	8	0	1	42	13	+29
Czech Republic	3	0	0	3	3	15	-12
Czechoslovakia	11	5	0	6	27	31	-4
Denmark	30	9	4	17	93	139	-46
Estonia	10	7	0	3	49	25	+24
Finland	6	2	0	4	13	31	-18
France	33	15	3	15	130	117	+13
Germany	16	3	1	12	29	71	-42
Hungary	35	15	1	19	96	118	-22
Israel	1	1	0	0	12	0	+12
Italy	21	7	2	12	70	99	-29
Japan	16	8	1	7	44	45	-1
Kazakhstan	10	3	1	7	23	33	-12
Latvia	12	4	1	7	39	50	-11
Lithuania	10	5	0	5	35	25	+10
Netherlands	30	22	1	7	155	99	+56
New Zealand	1	1	0	0	26	0	+26
North Korea	3	2	0	1	24	9	+15
Norway	23	4	1	18	59	124	-65
Poland	39	26	2	11	136	116	+20
Romania	27	22	1	4	140	66	+76
Russia	2	0	0	2	4	19	-15
Serbia	2	2	0	0	17	2	+15
Slovakia	5	0	0	5	7	29	-22
Slovenia	15	4	3	8	37	49	-12
South Korea	9	6	0	3	46	23	+23
Spain	5	4	0	1	46	17	+29
Sweden	15	4	2	9	27	65	-38
Switzerland	23	3	4	16	55	107	-52
Ukraine	10	4	1	5	22	38	-16
United States	14	3	3	8	38	59	-21
Yugoslavia	4	0	2	2	11	33	-22
Total	520	232	38	250	1 926	2 020	-94

== See also ==
- England men's national ice hockey team
- Great Britain men's national junior ice hockey team
- Great Britain men's national under-18 ice hockey team
- Great Britain women's national ice hockey team
- Scotland national ice hockey team
