= British Ice Hockey Hall of Fame =

Hall of fame

The British Ice Hockey Hall of Fame was founded in 1948 and is the third oldest ice hockey Hall of Fame in the world, behind the Russian and Soviet Hockey Hall of Fame (also founded in 1948) and the International Hockey Hall of Fame (founded in 1943). The Hall honours individuals who have made important contributions to the sport of hockey in Britain. The Hall houses displays and exhibitions of memorabilia depicting significant contributions of players, coaches, referees and other individuals.

The Hall of Fame was founded by the weekly Ice Hockey World newspaper in 1948. When the newspaper stopped being published in 1958, the Hall of Fame ceased to exist. In 1986, the Hall was re-established by the British Ice Hockey Writers' Association (now called Ice Hockey Journalists UK (IHJUK)). In 2018, Ice Hockey UK became the owners of the Hall of Fame.

A sub-committee meets each year to decide on a list of potential inductees. To be inducted, individuals must have contributed "outstanding service to British ice hockey".

== See also ==
- List of members of the British Ice Hockey Hall of Fame
