= Jim Mathieson (ice hockey) =

Canadian ice hockey player

- Born: January 24, 1970 (age 56) Kindersley, Saskatchewan, Canada
- Height: 6 ft 1 in (185 cm)
- Weight: 209 lb (95 kg; 14 st 13 lb)
- Position: Defense
- Shot: Left
- Played for: Washington Capitals; Baltimore Skipjacks; Portland Pirates; Newcastle Cobras; Nottingham Panthers; Newcastle Riverkings; Ayr Scottish Eagles
- NHL draft: 59th overall, 1989; Washington Capitals
- Playing career: 1989–2000

James Johnson Mathieson (born January 24, 1970) is a Canadian former professional ice hockey player. Mathieson was a defenceman for the Washington Capitals during the 1989–90 NHL season. He was drafted by the Capitals in the 1989 NHL entry draft. Jim graduated from Luther College high school in Regina, Saskatchewan in 1988.

== Career statistics ==
			Regular season					Playoffs
Season	Team	League	GP	G	A	Pts	PIM	GP	G	A	Pts	PIM
1986–87	Regina Pats	WHL	40	0	9	9	40	3	0	1	1	2
1987–88	Regina Pats	WHL	72	3	12	15	115	4	0	2	2	4
1988–89	Regina Pats	WHL	62	5	22	27	151	—	—	—	—	—
1989–90	Regina Pats	WHL	67	1	26	27	158	11	0	7	7	16
1989–90	Washington Capitals	NHL	2	0	0	0	4	—	—	—	—	—
1989–90	Baltimore Skipjacks	AHL	—	—	—	—	—	3	0	0	0	4
1990–91	Baltimore Skipjacks	AHL	65	3	5	8	168	4	1	0	1	6
1991–92	Baltimore Skipjacks	AHL	74	2	9	11	206	—	—	—	—	—
1992–93	Baltimore Skipjacks	AHL	46	3	5	8	88	3	0	1	1	23
1993–94	Portland Pirates	AHL	43	0	7	7	89	12	0	1	1	36
1994–95	Portland Pirates	AHL	35	5	5	10	119	7	1	0	1	4
1995–96	Portland Pirates	AHL	35	3	4	7	110	—	—	—	—	—
1996–97	Newcastle Cobras	BISL	35	1	0	1	36	5	0	0	0	29
1997–98	Nottingham Panthers	BISL	40	2	7	9	64	6	0	0	0	4
1998–99	Newcastle Riverkings	BISL	42	2	7	9	57	6	0	1	1	6
1999–00	Ayr Scottish Eagles	BISL	34	1	3	4	59	6	0	1	1	8
NHL totals			2	0	0	0	4	—	—	—	—	—
AHL totals			298	16	35	51	780	29	2	2	4	73
