= Shawn Byram =

Canadian ice hockey player

- Born: September 12, 1968 (age 57) Neepawa, Manitoba, Canada
- Height: 6 ft 3 in (191 cm)
- Weight: 211 lb (96 kg; 15 st 1 lb)
- Position: Centre
- Shot: Left
- Played for: New York Islanders; Chicago Blackhawks; Bracknell Bees; HC Fassa; HC Bolzano; Manchester Storm; CE Wien; Ayr Scottish Eagles
- NHL draft: 80th overall, 1986; New York Islanders
- Playing career: 1988–2003

Shawn D. Byram (born September 12, 1968) is a Canadian former ice hockey left winger who played five games in the National Hockey League (NHL) with the New York Islanders and Chicago Blackhawks between the 1990–91 and 1991–92 seasons. The rest of his career, which lasted from 1988 to 2003, was spent in the minor leagues and then in Europe. His son Bowen is also an NHL player.

== Playing career ==
Byram started his hockey career with the Regina Pats of the Western Hockey League. He was later traded to the Prince Albert Raiders.

Byram made his professional debut with the Indianapolis Ice in 1988. In 1991, he made his NHL debut with the New York Islanders of the National Hockey League. Byram played four games with the Islanders in his rookie season, accumulating 14 penalty minutes. On August 15, 1991, Bryam and the Chicago Blackhawks agreed to a one-year deal. Byram remained with the Blackhawks, playing with their IHL affiliate (Indianapolis Ice) until the conclusion of the 1993–94 season.

Byram spent the next eight seasons playing professionally in Europe, spending time in Italy, Austria, and the UK, before returning to the United States in 2002 to play with the Bakersfield Condors of the WCHL. Byram scored 65 points in 68 games, second highest among Falcons players in 2002–03.

Byram retired at the conclusion of the 2002–03 WCHL season.

== Personal life ==
Byram's son, Bowen, was drafted 4th overall in the 2019 NHL entry draft by the Colorado Avalanche and currently plays in the NHL. He was an assistant coach during Bo's final season with the Lethbridge Golden Hawks of the Alberta Major Bantam Hockey League (AMBHL) in 2015–16.

== Career statistics ==
=== Regular season and playoffs ===
			Regular season					Playoffs
Season	Team	League	GP	G	A	Pts	PIM	GP	G	A	Pts	PIM
1984–85	Regina Pat Canadians	SMAAAHL	25	12	21	33	38	—	—	—	—	—
1984–85	Regina Pats	WHL	4	0	1	1	0	1	0	0	0	0
1985–86	Regina Pats	WHL	46	7	6	13	45	9	0	1	1	11
1986–87	Regina Pats	WHL	12	3	3	6	25	—	—	—	—	—
1986–87	Prince Albert Raiders	WHL	55	16	18	34	122	7	1	1	2	10
1987–88	Prince Albert Raiders	WHL	61	23	28	51	178	10	2	5	7	27
1988–89	Springfield Indians	AHL	45	5	11	16	195	—	—	—	—	—
1988–89	Indianapolis Ice	IHL	1	0	0	0	2	—	—	—	—	—
1989–90	Springfield Indians	AHL	31	4	4	8	30	—	—	—	—	—
1989–90	Johnstown Chiefs	ECHL	8	5	5	10	35	—	—	—	—	—
1990–91	Capital District Islanders	AHL	62	28	35	63	162	—	—	—	—	—
1990–91	New York Islanders	NHL	4	0	0	0	14	—	—	—	—	—
1991–92	Indianapolis Ice	IHL	69	18	21	39	154	—	—	—	—	—
1991–92	Chicago Blackhawks	NHL	1	0	0	0	0	—	—	—	—	—
1992–93	Indianapolis Ice	IHL	41	2	13	15	123	5	1	2	3	8
1993–94	Indianapolis Ice	IHL	77	23	24	47	170	—	—	—	—	—
1994–95	Bracknell Bees	BHL	24	24	24	48	97	—	—	—	—	—
1994–95	HC Fassa	ITA	15	15	16	31	43	—	—	—	—	—
1995–96	HC Bolzano	ITA	7	3	3	6	16	—	—	—	—	—
1995–96	Manchester Storm	BD1	42	70	120	190	135	6	4	16	20	12
1996–97	Manchester Storm	BISL	23	8	12	20	38	—	—	—	—	—
1996–97	CE Wien	AUT	8	1	15	16	2	—	—	—	—	—
1996–97	Fresno Falcons	WCHL	6	3	5	8	13	5	2	5	7	67
1997–98	Ayr Scottish Eagles	BISL	45	18	31	49	101	9	5	3	8	4
1998–99	Ayr Scottish Eagles	BISL	23	9	12	21	30	13	8	15	23	4
1999–00	Ayr Scottish Eagles	BISL	42	17	32	49	108	7	2	2	4	27
2000–01	Ayr Scottish Eagles	BISL	48	8	29	37	100	7	0	4	4	16
2001–02	Ayr Scottish Eagles	BISL	42	11	19	30	85	7	2	2	4	32
2002–03	Bakersfield Condors	WCHL	68	22	43	65	121	3	0	0	0	2
BISL totals			223	71	135	206	462	43	17	26	43	83
NHL totals			5	0	0	0	14	—	—	—	—	—
