= John Parco =

Italian-Canadian ice hockey player

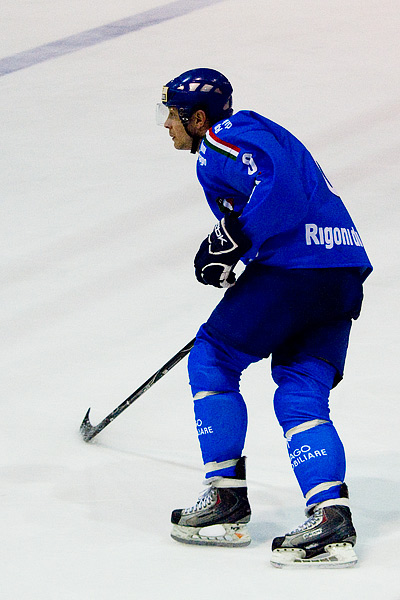
- Born: August 25, 1971 (age 54) Sault Ste. Marie, Ontario, Canada
- Height: 6 ft 0 in (183 cm)
- Weight: 175 lb (79 kg; 12 st 7 lb)
- Position: Centre
- Shot: Left
- Played for: Asiago HC (Serie A)
- National team: Italy
- NHL draft: 248th overall, 1991; Philadelphia Flyers
- Playing career: 1991–2010

John Parco (born August 25, 1971) is an Italian-Canadian former professional ice hockey player who played most of his professional career with Asiago HC in the Serie A. He is formerly the head coach of the Soo Thunderbirds in the Northern Ontario Junior Hockey League and was formerly the head coach of Asiago HC and SG Cortina in Serie A. Internationally he represented Italy from 2003 until 2010 highlighted by scoring 3 goals in the Turin Olympics.

== Playing career ==
John Parco, born John Porco, played three seasons of junior hockey for the Belleville Bulls of the Ontario Hockey League (OHL) from 1988 until 1991. He was drafted 248th overall by the Philadelphia Flyers in the 1991 NHL entry draft but never played in the NHL. Instead Parco joined Asiago HC in Italy for two seasons. In 1993, Parco moved back to North America and split the season with the IHL's San Diego Gulls, the ECHL's Hampton Roads Admirals and the AHL's Saint John Flames. He moved back to Asiago the next season before moving to the Deutsche Eishockey Liga in Germany, spending two seasons with the Kaufbeurer Adler. He then had a two-year spell with the Ayr Scottish Eagles in the United Kingdom. He returned to Hampton Roads in 1999 for one season before moving back to Britain with the Cardiff Devils. In 2001, he returned to Asiago where he remained as a player until 2010 and then started working as an assistant coach. In 2004, he was player-coach of the team but had little success and was replaced mid-season while remaining as a player. He became head coach of Asiago again in 2012.

== Career statistics ==
=== Regular season and playoffs ===
			Regular season					Playoffs
Season	Team	League	GP	G	A	Pts	PIM	GP	G	A	Pts	PIM
1987–88	Sault Ste. Marie North Stars U18	GNML	31	33	49	82	42	—	—	—	—	—
1988–89	Belleville Bulls	OHL	66	35	33	68	16	5	0	0	0	4
1989–90	Belleville Bulls	OHL	66	34	61	95	46	11	1	4	5	18
1990–91	Belleville Bulls	OHL	63	40	54	94	41	6	5	3	8	4
1991–92	HC Asiago	Italy	14	5	6	11	6	—	—	—	—	—
1992–93	HC Asiago	Italy	37	24	27	51	24	9	5	7	12	6
1994–95	Hampton Roads Admirals	ECHL	54	36	44	80	97	3	4	1	5	0
1994–95	San Diego Gulls	IHL	6	2	1	3	4	—	—	—	—	—
1994–95	Saint John Flames	AHL	3	1	0	1	2	—	—	—	—	—
1995–96	HC Asiago	Italy	32	22	21	43	30	3	2	3	5	0
1996–97	Kaufbeurer Adler	DEL	48	14	21	35	16	—	—	—	—	—
1997–98	Kaufbeurer Adler	DEL	15	3	2	5	6	—	—	—	—	—
1997–98	Ayr Scottish Eagles	BISL	35	11	24	35	6	9	3	3	6	0
1998–99	Ayr Scottish Eagles	BISL	24	6	9	15	8	—	—	—	—	—
1999–2000	Hampton Roads Admirals	ECHL	52	19	33	52	34	3	1	3	4	2
2000–01	Cardiff Devils	BISL	33	13	14	27	38	4	0	0	0	6
2001–02	HC Asiago	Italy	16	9	7	16	31	1	0	0	0	2
2002–03	HC Asiago	Italy	10	3	5	8	12	11	2	3	5	4
2004–05	HC Asiago	Italy	29	9	13	22	14	9	2	5	7	8
2005–06	HC Asiago	Italy	45	14	27	41	81	—	—	—	—	—
2006–07	HC Asiago	Italy	32	17	17	34	30	—	—	—	—	—
2007–08	HC Asiago	Italy	33	17	21	38	24	—	—	—	—	—
2008–09	HC Asiago	Italy	36	10	19	29	24	3	2	0	2	4
2009–10	HC Asiago	Italy	37	8	27	35	36	16	3	7	10	8
2010–11	HC Asiago	Italy	8	3	3	6	2	—	—	—	—	—
Italy totals			329	141	193	334	314	52	16	25	41	32

=== International ===
Year	Team	Event	GP	G	A	Pts	PIM
2003	Italy	WC D1	5	0	3	3	6
2005	Italy	WC D1	5	3	1	4	2
2006	Italy	OG	5	3	1	4	10
2006	Italy	WC	4	0	2	2	4
2007	Italy	WC	6	0	0	0	2
2008	Italy	WC	2	0	0	0	0
2009	Italy	WC D1	5	2	0	2	2
2010	Italy	WC	6	0	0	0	2
Senior totals			38	8	7	15	28
