= Arkiomaa =

Arkiomaa is a Finnish surname. Notable people with the surname include:

- Eetu-Ville Arkiomaa (born 1993), Finnish ice hockey player
- Tero Arkiomaa (born 1968), Finnish ice hockey player
