= František Procházka =

Czech ice hockey player

- Born: 25 January 1962; Brno, Czechoslovakia
- Died: 27 April 2012 (aged 50)
- Height: 6 ft 1 in (185 cm)
- Weight: 220 lb (100 kg; 15 st 10 lb)
- Position: Defence
- Shot: Left
- Played for: TJ CHZ Litvínov; Jokerit; EHC Freiburg; HC Milano Devils; ESG Füchse Sachsen; Ayr Scottish Eagles
- National team: Czechoslovakia
- Playing career: 1980–2000

Olympic medal record

Ice hockey
Bronze medal – third place	1992 Albertville	Ice hockey

František Procházka (25 January 1962 – 27 April 2012) was a Czech ice hockey defenseman who played on the 1992 bronze medal-winning Olympic ice hockey team for Czechoslovakia.

== Career ==
Procházka began his career with TJ CHZ Litvínov and played for the team from 1980 to 1990. He then moved to Finland's SM-liiga with Jokerit for one season before joining EHC Freiburg of the Eishockey-Bundesliga in Germany.

In 1993, Procházka joined HC Milano Devils of Serie A won the Serie A championship with the team that season. He returned to Germany in 1995, signing for ESG Füchse Sachsen of the Deutsche Eishockey Liga before moving to the United Kingdom the following year, playing for the Ayr Scottish Eagles of the Ice Hockey Superleague.

In 1997, Procházka returned to Litvínov for one season before finishing his career in Germany's third-tier league the Oberliga, with single-season spells at ERC Haßfurt and ESC Dresden.

Procházka was also a member of the Czechoslovakia national team, playing in four Ice Hockey World Championships as well as the 1992 Winter Olympics where he won a bronze medal.

Following his playing career, he worked as a coach of the Czech 1.liga team HC Teplice for some time. Procházka died on 27 April 2012 at aged 50 following a long illness.

== Career statistics ==
=== Regular season and playoffs ===
			Regular season					Playoffs
Season	Team	League	GP	G	A	Pts	PIM	GP	G	A	Pts	PIM
1980–81	TJ CHZ Litvínov	TCH	5	0	1	1	4	—	—	—	—	—
1982–83	TS Topoľčany	SVK II	—	—	—	—	—	—	—	—	—	—
1983–84	TJ CHZ Litvínov	TCH	34	1	4	5	20	—	—	—	—	—
1984–85	TJ CHZ Litvínov	TCH	42	4	7	11	44	—	—	—	—	—
1985–86	TJ CHZ Litvínov	TCH	44	12	11	23	26	—	—	—	—	—
1986–87	TJ CHZ Litvínov	TCH	24	2	3	5	36	—	—	—	—	—
1987–88	TJ CHZ Litvínov	TCH	41	13	12	25	24	—	—	—	—	—
1988–89	TJ CHZ Litvínov	TCH	39	16	18	34	56	—	—	—	—	—
1989–90	TJ CHZ Litvínov	TCH	52	19	7	26	—	—	—	—	—	—
1990–91	Jokerit	Liiga	32	6	4	10	38	—	—	—	—	—
1991–92	EHC Freiburg	1.GBun	43	25	15	40	30	4	1	0	1	4
1992–93	EHC Freiburg	1.GBun	37	13	17	30	50	—	—	—	—	—
1993–94	HC Devils Milano	ITA	22	10	8	18	8	—	—	—	—	—
1994–95	HC Devils Milano	ITA	5	1	1	2	6	—	—	—	—	—
1995–96	ESG Füchse Sachsen	DEL	37	12	12	24	24	—	—	—	—	—
1996–97	Ayr Scottish Eagles	GBR	41	5	7	12	20	7	0	5	5	2
1997–98	HC Chemopetrol, a.s.	ELH	47	9	3	12	56	4	0	0	0	2
1998–99	ERC Haßfurt	DEU III	42	10	11	21	48	—	—	—	—	—
1999–2000	ERC Haßfurt	DEU III	42	8	15	23	36	—	—	—	—	—
TCH totals			281	68	62	190	210	—	—	—	—	—

=== International ===
Year	Team	Event	GP	G	A	Pts	PIM
1986	Czechoslovakia	WC	10	3	1	4	28
1989	Czechoslovakia	WC	10	2	0	2	6
1990	Czechoslovakia	WC	10	2	0	2	16
1992	Czechoslovakia	OG	8	1	1	2	4
1992	Czechoslovakia	WC	8	3	2	5	18
Senior totals			46	11	4	15	72
