= Scott Young (ice hockey, born 1965) =

Canadian-British ice hockey player

- Born: May 26, 1965 (age 59); Oakville, Ontario, Canada
- Height: 6 ft 1 in (185 cm)
- Weight: 198 lb (90 kg; 14 st 2 lb)
- Position: Defence
- Shot: Left
- Played for: New Haven Nighthawks; Heerenveen Flyers; Ayr Scottish Eagles
- National team: Great Britain
- Playing career: 1989–2006

Scott Young (born May 26, 1965) is a Canadian-British former professional ice hockey defenceman.

== Playing career ==
Between 1989 and 1991, Young played in the American Hockey League for the New Haven Nighthawks, the International Hockey League for the San Diego Gulls and Phoenix Roadrunners, and the East Coast Hockey League for the Knoxville Cherokees. He then had a two-year spell in The Netherlands for the Heerenveen Flyers before moving to the United Kingdom in 1993 where he would spend the next ten seasons. His spell included a five-year stay with the Ayr Scottish Eagles of the Ice Hockey Superleague, where he won the BISL Championship in 1998 and was named into the BISL First All-Star Team that same year. Young was also a member of the Great Britain national team.

== Career statistics ==
			Regular season					Playoffs
Season	Team	League	GP	G	A	Pts	PIM	GP	G	A	Pts	PIM
1985–86	Colgate University	NCAA	28	5	6	11	88	—	—	—	—	—
1986–87	Colgate University	NCAA	33	13	15	28	113	—	—	—	—	—
1987–88	Colgate University	NCAA	14	4	10	14	44	—	—	—	—	—
1988–89	Colgate University	NCAA	31	15	22	37	150	—	—	—	—	—
1988–89	New Haven Nighthawks	AHL	7	1	1	2	4	6	0	0	0	2
1989–90	New Haven Nighthawks	AHL	58	7	11	18	62	—	—	—	—	—
1990–91	New Haven Nighthawks	AHL	34	5	10	15	20	—	—	—	—	—
1990–91	San Diego Gulls	IHL	14	0	5	5	12	—	—	—	—	—
1990–91	Phoenix Roadrunners	IHL	5	0	0	0	2	—	—	—	—	—
1990–91	Knoxville Cherokees	ECHL	8	3	8	11	49	3	2	1	3	12
1991–92	Heerenveen Flyers	Hlnd	6	3	9	12	46	—	—	—	—	—
1992–93	Heerenveen Flyers	Hlnd	34	28	47	75	111	—	—	—	—	—
1993–94	Teesside Bombers	BHL	45	60	51	111	296	—	—	—	—	—
1994–95	Humberside Hawks	BHL	39	49	46	95	210	—	—	—	—	—
1995–96	Humberside Hawks	BHL	14	13	26	39	48	—	—	—	—	—
1995–96	Milton Keynes Kings	BHL	22	19	30	49	149	—	—	—	—	—
1996–97	Ayr Scottish Eagles	BISL	41	16	20	36	126	—	—	—	—	—
1997–98	Ayr Scottish Eagles	BISL	45	13	22	35	129	—	—	—	—	—
1998–99	Ayr Scottish Eagles	BISL	40	6	9	15	38	—	—	—	—	—
1999–00	Ayr Scottish Eagles	BISL	37	7	18	25	127	6	1	0	1	12
2000–01	Ayr Scottish Eagles	BISL	47	7	13	20	133	7	2	4	6	20
2001–02	Dundee Stars	BNL	44	35	49	84	167	8	5	6	11	20
2002–03	Dundee Stars	BNL	9	6	13	19	24	—	—	—	—	—
2002–03	Hull Thunder	BNL	24	11	20	31	114	—	—	—	—	—
2003–04	Dundee Stars	BNL	4	1	1	2	56	—	—	—	—	—
2003–04	Dundas Real McCoys	OHASr	4	0	3	3	0	—	—	—	—	—
2003–04	Cape Fear Fire Antz	SEHL	36	11	27	38	70	2	1	4	5	4
2004–05	Dundas Real McCoys	OHASr	24	8	15	23	39	—	—	—	—	—
2005–06	Dundas Real McCoys	OHASr	12	6	9	15	54	—	—	—	—	—

== Awards and honors ==
Award	Year
All-ECAC Hockey First Team	1988–89
