= Mark Woolf =

- Born: September 30, 1970 (age 56) Brandon, Manitoba, Canada
- Height: 6 ft 0 in (183 cm)
- Weight: 210 lb (95 kg; 15 st 0 lb)
- Position: Right Wing
- Shot: Right
- Played for: Springfield Indians (AHL); Worcester IceCats (AHL)
- NHL draft: 126th overall, 1990; Boston Bruins
- Playing career: 1991–2007

Mark Woolf (born September 30, 1970) is a retired professional ice hockey and inline hockey player who was drafted by Boston Bruins 126th overall in the 1990 NHL entry draft. He also competed at the IIHF InLine Hockey World Championship representing Canada.

== Career statistics ==
=== Ice hockey ===
			Regular season					Playoffs
Season	Team	League	GP	G	A	Pts	PIM	GP	G	A	Pts	PIM
1986-87	Medicine Hat Tigers	WHL	5	1	0	1	0	--	--	--	--	--
1987-88	Medicine Hat Tigers	WHL	67	19	14	33	56	15	4	0	4	19
1988-89	Medicine Hat Tigers	WHL	65	27	54	81	89	2	0	2	2	4
1989-90	Medicine Hat Tigers	WHL	47	35	33	68	45	--	--	--	--	--
1989-90	Spokane Chiefs	WHL	21	17	19	36	28	6	2	1	3	9
1990-91	Spokane Chiefs	WHL	67	41	49	90	96	13	8	6	14	14
1991-92	Roanoke Valley Rebels	ECHL	63	50	51	101	93	7	6	2	8	4
1991-92	Salt Lake Golden Eagles	IHL	1	0	0	0	0	--	--	--	--	--
1992-93	Thunder Bay Thunder Hawks	CoHL	33	16	20	36	18	--	--	--	--	--
1992-93	Columbus Chill	ECHL	26	8	10	18	45	--	--	--	--	--
1992-93	Adirondack Red Wings	AHL	1	0	0	0	0	--	--	--	--	--
1993-94	Columbus Chill	ECHL	51	42	29	71	103	6	1	2	3	8
1993-94	Springfield Indians	AHL	15	2	3	5	4	2	0	0	0	0
1994-95	Worcester IceCats	AHL	7	1	0	1	0	--	--	--	--	--
1994-95	Huntington Blizzard	ECHL	59	38	36	74	96	4	0	2	2	8
1995-96	Kapfenberg EC	Aust	26	13	10	23	78
1996-97	Ayr Scottish Eagles	BISL	42	15	15	30	50
1997-98	Ayr Scottish Eagles	BISL	45	22	24	46	26
1998-99	Ayr Scottish Eagles	BISL	37	14	18	32	14
1999-00	San Diego Gulls	WCHL	66	50	31	81	98	9	5	7	12	21
2000-01	San Diego Gulls	WCHL	67	39	43	82	119	13	5	8	13	22
2001-02	San Diego Gulls	WCHL	64	50	47	97	145	8	6	5	11	20
2002-03	Milton Keynes Lightning	EPIHL	1	0	0	0	0
2002-03	Regensburg EV	2.GBun	35	26	29	55	58	--	--	--	--	--
2003-04	Regensburg EV	2.GBun	47	36	26	62	92	5	3	1	4	6
2004-05	Regensburg EV	2.GBun	44	25	31	56	42
2005-06	Laval Chiefs	LNAH	14	8	12	20	4
2005-06	Regensburg EV	2.GBun	18	17	12	29	0
2006-07	Regensburg EV	2.GBun	23	12	11	23	0
2006-07	St. Jean Chiefs	LNAH	12	5	6	11	9

=== Inline hockey ===
			Regular season					Playoffs
Season	Team	League	GP	G	A	Pts	PIM	GP	G	A	Pts	PIM
1995	San Jose Rhinos	RHI	24	29	40	69	36
1996	San Jose Rhinos	RHI	27	32	53	85	25
1997	San Jose Rhinos	RHI	24	35	29	64	20
1998	Anaheim Bullfrogs	MLRH	20	33	52	85	23
1999	San Jose Rhinos	RHI	24	22	21	43	36
