= Centrum Arena (Prestwick) =

Former ice hockey arena in South Ayrshire, Scotland

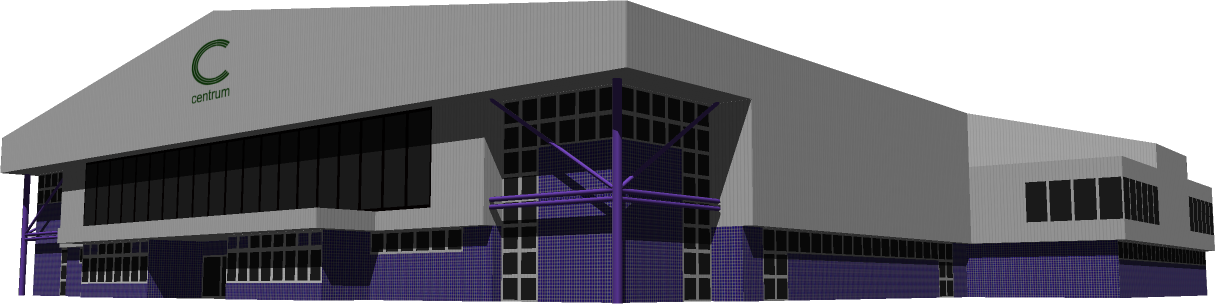
- Computer generated image of the Arena
- Interactive map of Centrum Arena
- Location: 125 Ayr Road, Prestwick, Scotland
- Coordinates: 55°29′14″N 4°36′59″W
- Owner: Barr Holdings Limited
- Operator: Barr Leisure Limited
- Capacity: 2733 (all seated)
- Surface: IIHF Specification
- Field size: 200 ft × 103 ft (61 m × 31 m)

Construction
- Groundbreaking: 1986
- Built: 1996
- Opened: 25 August 1996
- Closed: 2002
- Demolished: 2009
- General contractor: Dawn Construction Limited
- Main contractor: Laing Scotland Limited

Tenant
- Ice Hockey Services Limited

The Centrum Arena was a 2,733 seat ice arena in Prestwick, South Ayrshire, Scotland that opened on 25 August 1996. The arena was used during the winter months for recreational ice skating and ice hockey matches. In the summer months, the arena was used for various events such as the Chinese State Circus. The Centrum was famous as the home of the Ayr Scottish Eagles ice hockey club from 1996 until 2002. The building was located at 125 Ayr Road on public land, but was demolished in 2009. Today the site is occupied by a supermarket.

== History ==
In the early 1980s, Kyle and Carrick District Council granted a 100-year lease for the site on which the Centrum was built, as a replacement facility for the former Ayr Ice Rink. A condition attached to the lease was that the site could only be used for a multi-purpose arena. The site is now owned by South Ayrshire Council.

Caledonian Ice Hockey Ltd, part of the Glen Henderson Group, began construction of the Centrum in 1986 as a replacement rink for the Ayr Raiders Ice Hockey Club. During the construction phase, notable people related to ice sports visited the facility, including Torvill and Dean.

The construction phase was delayed and the building stood incomplete for a substantial period after the project had been abandoned, before being acquired by Barr Holdings Ltd in 1993. Barr Leisure Ltd, whilst securing £500,000 of National Lottery Funding, invested further sums to complete the project.

== Operation ==
Opening on 25 August 1996, the Centrum was run by Barr Leisure Limited, a subsidiary of Barr Holdings Ltd, and became home of the Ayr Scottish Eagles Ice Hockey Club. The Eagles played their first home game on 1 September 1996.

Designed as a purpose built ice hockey arena, at the time the Centrum had the United Kingdom's largest ice pad at 103 by 200 feet (31 m × 61 m), designed to International Ice Hockey Federation specification, seating 2,733 persons with several VIP booths.

The Centrum had a four-faced ice hockey scoreboard over the faceoff circle with a rotating advertisement wheel beneath displaying Barr Holdings Limited's subsidiary companies. There were two ice resurfacer machines of the Zamboni marque.

The Centrum contained a sports bar to the rear called Tholos, a fitness centre to the front called Aurigin and an ice hockey pro shop selling ice hockey equipment as well as replica Eagles ice hockey jerseys. Public skating was offered with skate hire facilities.

The Centrum was mainly used as an ice-hockey venue for the Ice Hockey Superleague but was also capable of hosting events such as the Chinese State Circus and motor shows both in the off-season and during winter by covering the ice pad.

When the Eagles ice hockey club moved to Braehead Arena in 2002, the Centrum Arena effectively closed its doors to the public, although it was still used for practice by the Eagles on occasion. The Eagles ice hockey club went bankrupt after six home games at Braehead. The last ice hockey match at the Centrum was staged on 4 February 2003. Organised by Friends of Eagles Hockey, this exhibition match was a fund-raising event to raise funds for players and officials who had been left in financial difficulty due to the bankruptcy of Ice Hockey Services Ltd, the Eagles operating company.

Local ice hockey fan group, Friends of Eagles Hockey, campaigned for the return of ice hockey to the Centrum Arena after the Eagles's demise, and indeed for a replacement facility once the Centrum was demolished.

== Closure ==
The sports bar Tholos and fitness centre Aurigin remained open whilst the arena was closed. The Centrum arena stood for empty for six years after being stripped out of most of the equipment; the scoreboard can be seen at Dundalk Ice Dome in County Louth, Ireland.

On 6 November 2006, Dawn Construction announced its purchase of the leasehold from Barr Holdings Ltd for about £700,000, and went into dialogue with South Ayrshire Council into possible alternative uses for the site.

The South Ayrshire Local Plan that was adopted by South Ayrshire Council on 6 April 2007, that outlines policies for the development and use of land in South Ayrshire states Policy Tourism 3 was associated with the Centrum.

Policy Tourism 3: There shall be a presumption in favour of the retention and improvement of existing significant leisure, recreation and tourist facilities

— South Ayrshire Council, Local Plan, 2007, p27

Planet Ice approached Dawn Developments Limited to enquire about running the facility as an ice rink, but were turned down by Dawn. Shortly afterwards, Dawn lodged an application to demolish the rink; this proved contentious amongst the local public, who were concerned over the loss of the facilities and that a supermarket might be constructed on the site. South Ayrshire Council said there were no plans for a supermarket to be constructed on the site. The Centrum's demolition was opposed by Friends of the Eagles Hockey but supported by Prestwick Community Council, who saw its demolition as a step toward regeneration of the Prestwick Toll area, stating that the Centrum had become a target for vandals.

The demolition of the Centrum commenced on Monday 16 February 2009, after being brought forward from its original scheduled demolition in late 2009. Dawn Developments stated that this was due to pressure from Prestwick Community Council, who had concerns that the Centrum would become a target for anti-social behaviour including vandalism. The demolition contractor was N&R Demolitions Ltd.

== Aftermath ==
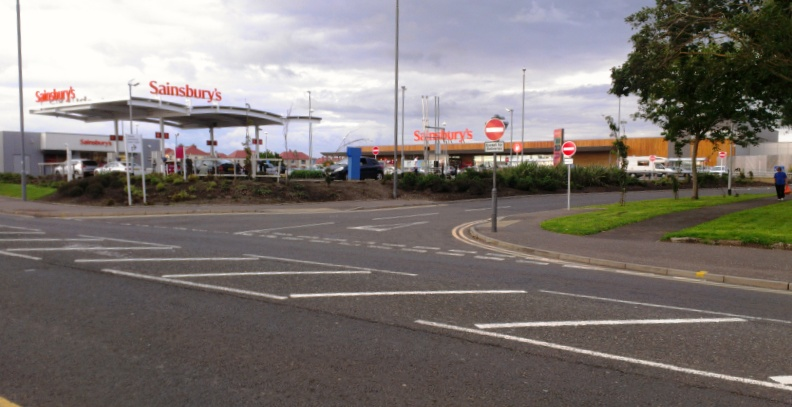
The site today

The site was entirely redeveloped. A petrol station and car park of the new Sainsbury's supermarket are located where the Centrum formerly stood.

The supermarket, which was opened on Wednesday 14 July 2010, is at the rear of the site of the Centrum overflow car park for the Centrum. There is 45,000 sq ft (4,200 m^{2}) of shop space.

The ground lease will expire on 31 August 2109.
