= Eetu-Ville Arkiomaa =

Finnish ice hockey player

- Born: August 26, 1993 (age 31); Rauma, Finland
- Height: 6 ft 0 in (183 cm)
- Weight: 185 lb (84 kg; 13 st 3 lb)
- Position: Forward
- Shoots: Right
- Liiga team Former teams: Espoo Blues; SaPKo; Peliitat Heinola; HPK
- NHL draft: Undrafted
- Playing career: 2013–present

Eetu-Ville Arkiomaa (born August 26, 1993) is a Finnish professional ice hockey player. He is currently playing for Espoo Blues of the Finnish Liiga.

Eetu-Ville Arkiomaa made his Liiga debut playing with SaPKo during the 2013–14 Liiga season.

== Personal ==
Arkiomaa was born in Rauma, Finland, the son of Tero Arkiomaa who played professional ice hockey for 20 seasons throughout Europe. His uncle Tomi spent 15 seasons playing in the Finnish 2. Divisioona.
