= Andrea Ludwig =

Canadian opera singer

Andrea Nadine Ludwig
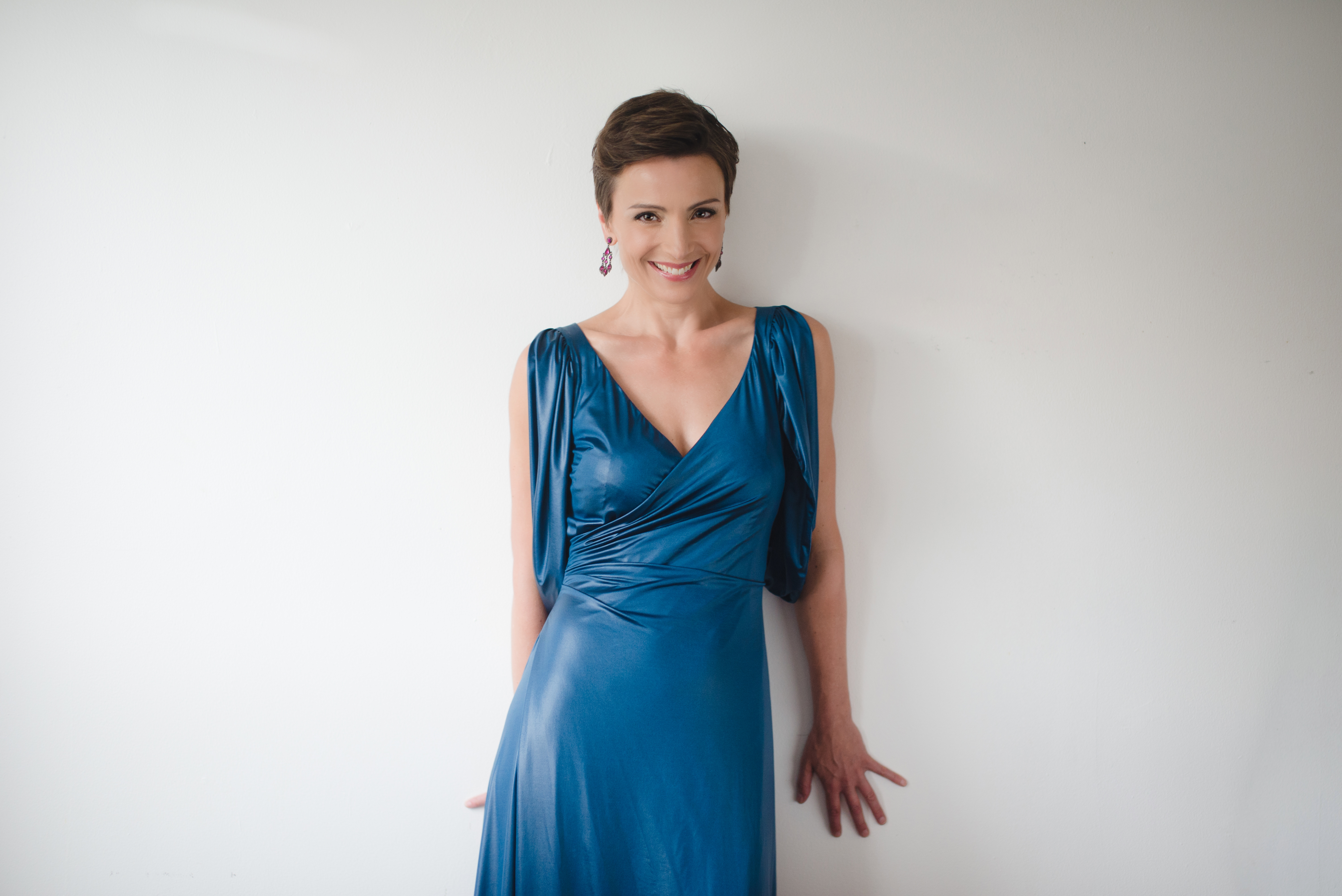
- Born: September 25, 1970 (age 56); Regina, Saskatchewan, Canada
- Education: University of Toronto
- Occupations: Opera singer (mezzo-soprano), Actress
- Years active: 1995–present
- Children: 2
- Website: http://andrealudwig.ca/

Andrea Ludwig (born September 25, 1970) is a Canadian-born mezzo-soprano opera singer based in Toronto, Ontario. Born and raised in Regina, Saskatchewan, her mother was a nurse and her father was a German Lutheran pastor. She has three brothers and two sisters. She participated in the Kiwanis Music Festival between the ages of 8 and 15 years old. After graduating from Luther College High School she moved to Toronto intending to study piano at the University of Toronto. However she changed her major to Vocal Performance and graduated in 2001 with an Opera Diploma. She is also a 2002 Canadian Opera Company Ensemble graduate.

Andrea has been a member of the Elmer Iseler Singers in Toronto as the Mezzo Soprano from 1995 to 1999 and again from 2009 to 2017.

Andrea was nominated for a JUNO award in 2016 for her vocal performance Peter Togni's Responsio project (in the category Classical Album of the Year: Vocal or Choral Performance). Ludwig performs in concert with a wide range of presenters and has sung numerous roles with the Canadian Opera Company, Edmonton Opera, Philadelphia Opera, San Francisco Opera and the Festival d'Aix-en-Provence. In 2018 she played The Landlady in The Overcoat (Canstage/Tapestry) and reprised the same role at Vancouver Opera.

== Discography ==
Album appearances

- 2018 Nestor Nyzhankivsky: Galicians ll, with the Ukrainian Art Song Project. (CD)
- 2017 Music of Franz Schubert (1797-1828) Conducted by Bernhard Gueller/Featuring Andrea Ludwig, mezzo-soprano (CD)
- 2015 Responsio Peter-Anthony Togni - Responsio (CD)
- 2009 Peter-Anthony Togni - Jeff Reilly (3), Elmer Iseler Singers, Lydia Adams (2) - Lamentatio Jeremiae Prophetae (CD, Album)
- 1998 The Elmer Iseler Singers*, Norine Burgess, Michael Schade, Mireille Lagacé - Noël - Early Canadian Christmas Music (CD, Album)
- 1998 Elmer Iseler Singers - A Canadian Panorama (CD)
