= Bowen Byram =

Canadian ice hockey player (born 2001)

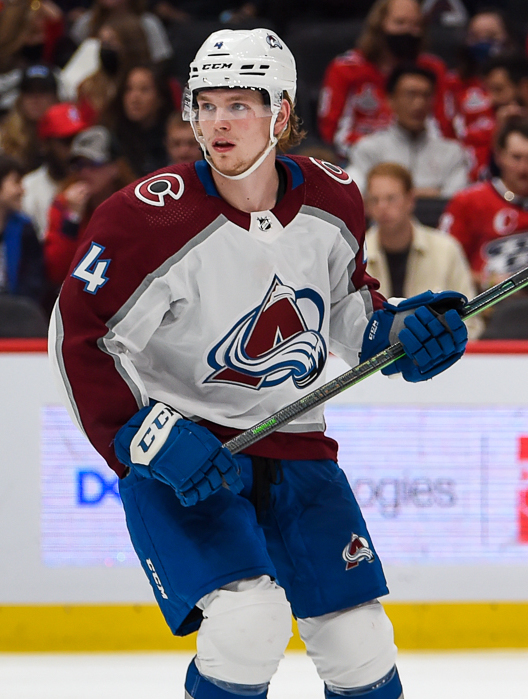
- Byram with the Colorado Avalanche in 2021
- Born: June 13, 2001 (age 25) Cranbrook, British Columbia, Canada
- Height: 6 ft 1 in (185 cm)
- Weight: 205 lb (93 kg; 14 st 9 lb)
- Position: Defense
- Shoots: Left
- NHL team Former teams: Chicago Blackhawks; Colorado Avalanche; Buffalo Sabres
- National team: Canada
- NHL draft: 4th overall, 2019; Colorado Avalanche
- Playing career: 2021–present

Bowen Byram (born June 13, 2001) is a Canadian professional ice hockey player who is a defenseman for the Chicago Blackhawks of the National Hockey League (NHL). He previously played for the Colorado Avalanche and Buffalo Sabres, and has appeared with the Canada men's national ice hockey team in international competition.

The son of NHL player Shawn Byram, Bowen was coached by his father until the age of 12, when he began playing full-time minor ice hockey in Alberta. The Vancouver Giants of the Western Hockey League (WHL) took Byram third overall in the 2016 WHL Bantam Draft. In three years with the Giants, Byram earned a number of junior ice hockey awards, including the CHL Top Draft Prospect Award. Considered a top prospect by the NHL Central Scouting Bureau, Byram was taken fourth overall by the Avalanche in the 2019 NHL entry draft.

Byram's tenure with the Avalanche was marred by injury. He missed large parts of his first two professional ice hockey seasons with concussion complications, and another with a lower-body injury. Despite this, his breakout performance in the 2022 Stanley Cup playoffs helped lead Colorado to a championship. In 2024, the Avalanche traded Byram to the Sabres, who were in need of a young top-pair defenceman.

== Early life ==
Bowen Byram was born on June 13, 2001, in Cranbrook, British Columbia, Canada, to Stacey and Shawn Byram. His father was a professional ice hockey player who followed his brief stint in the National Hockey League (NHL) with 11 seasons in minor and European leagues. Shawn served as his son's hockey coach until Bowen was 12, at which point he joined the Lethbridge Golden Hawks of the Alberta Major Bantam Hockey League (AMBHL). Michael Dyck, the Lethbridge coach, first noticed Byram during a minor ice hockey game when he was 10 years old. He spent two seasons with Lethbridge, and during the 2015–16 AMBHL season, Byram was the top-scoring defenceman in the league, with 22 goals and 37 assists in 34 games. The Golden Hawks won the AMBHL championships and finished in third place at the Western Canadian Bantam AAA Championship.

== Playing career ==
=== Junior ===
Following his successful stint in the AMBHL, Byram was selected third overall by the Vancouver Giants of the Western Hockey League (WHL) at the 2016 WHL Bantam Draft, and he signed with the team shortly afterwards. As he still had a year of minor midget hockey availability, he was only eligible to appear in five WHL games during the 2016–17 season, but he ultimately appeared in 11 junior ice hockey games that season, splitting time between Vancouver, Yale Hockey Academy in Abbotsford, British Columbia, and the Lethbridge Hurricanes of the Alberta Midget Hockey League (AMHL). With Yale, Byram recorded 29 points in 20 regular season games, as well as four points in three postseason appearances.

Playing his first full season with the Giants in 2017–18, Byram scored his first WHL goal on October 21, 2017, as part of a 5–2 victory over the Regina Pats. By February, Byram was registering almost 23 minutes of ice time per game, and was considered not only a top prospect for the National Hockey League (NHL) but a future captain for the Giants. That month, he recorded three goals and six assists in a span of 12 games and was subsequently named the WHL Rookie of the Month. With six goals and 27 points in 60 regular season games, Byram outscored former Giants star Jonathon Blum, considered one of the top players on the team, who only recorded 24 points during his 16-year-old season. Although the Giants lost their opening-round playoff series to the Victoria Royals, Byram added three postseason goals and four assists to his season totals. At the end of the year, Byram was named the WHL Western Conference Rookie of the Year, and he was the runner-up to Dylan Cozens of the Lethbridge Hurricanes for the Jim Piggott Memorial Trophy.

On November 22, 2018, only 23 games into the 2018–19 season, scored his seventh goal of the season, surpassing his previous season totals. With nine goals and 25 points halfway through the season, Byram was selected to represent the Giants at the 2019 Sherwin-Williams Top Prospects Game. After a five-point game against the Kamloops Blazers on January 13, 2019, Byram, who set a franchise record for most single-game points by a defenceman, was named the WHL On the Run Player of the Week. That March, Byram scored his sixth overtime goal of the season to help defeat the Tri-City Americans 4–3, setting a WHL record for most overtime goals in one year in the process. With 26 goals and 45 assists in 67 regular season games, Byram set a Giants record for the most goals by any defenceman in a season and helped the team clinch the No. 1 seed in the WHL Western Conference playoffs. Although Vancouver lost to the Prince Albert Raiders in the final playoff round, Byram led all WHL skaters with 26 points (eight goals and 18 assists) in 22 postseason games, and he was the first Vancouver Giant to ever receive the CHL Top Draft Prospect Award. He was also named to the WHL Western Conference First All-Star Team. His performance with Vancouver that season led the NHL Central Scouting Bureau to rank Byram the second-best North American skater available in the upcoming 2019 NHL entry draft. Byram was the first defenceman taken in that year's draft, selected fourth overall by the Colorado Avalanche. He signed a three-year, entry-level contract with the team on July 19, 2019.

Byram was invited to join the Avalanche for their 2019 training camp, but was returned to the Giants for the 2019–20 season. He had a slow start with Vancouver that season, netting only three goals in 27 games before leaving the team to join Canada at the 2020 World Junior Ice Hockey Championships in December. His return from the World Juniors was followed by a surge in scoring, with seven goals and 17 assists through 12 games in the month of February, and Byram was named the WHL Player of the Month. By the time that the WHL season was prematurely suspended in March due to the COVID-19 pandemic, Byram had 14 goals, 52 points, and a +19 plus–minus through 50 games. He was named to the WHL Western Conference Second All-Star Team and finished his junior hockey career with 46 goals and 150 points in 188 regular season games, as well as 33 points in an additional 29 postseason games.

=== Professional ===
==== Colorado Avalanche (2021–2024) ====
As he had participated abroad in the 2021 World Junior Ice Hockey Championships, Byram's NHL debut was delayed as he had to clear a seven-day quarantine and produce four negative COVID-19 tests before joining his teammates in Colorado. He made his NHL debut on January 21, 2021, playing for 11 minutes with one shot on goal and one minor penalty in a 4–2 loss to the Los Angeles Kings. His first NHL point came the following day, an assist on a Mikko Rantanen goal in the third period of a 2–1 win over the Anaheim Ducks. At the end of February, however, Byram's rookie season was put on hold when he woke up with concussion symptoms; he did not know what caused the concussion, but he began feeling ill the day after a game against the Arizona Coyotes. He returned on March 18 and played in four games, missing one with a lower-body injury, before taking a hit from Keegan Kolesar of the Vegas Golden Knights on March 25, and he was placed in concussion protocols three days later. While still in concussion protocols, Byram contracted COVID-19, which exacerbated his symptoms, particularly vertigo, and even after he was medically cleared to play, coach Jared Bednar chose not to put Byram on the line-up. He was finally added back into the Avalanche on May 26, in time for the second round of the 2021 Stanley Cup playoffs. Bednar was reluctant to allow Byram to take the ice, however, and he did not appear in any part of the Golden Knights' six-game victory over the Avalanche. He appeared in only 19 games as a rookie in the 2020–21 season, with two assists and a +1 rating.

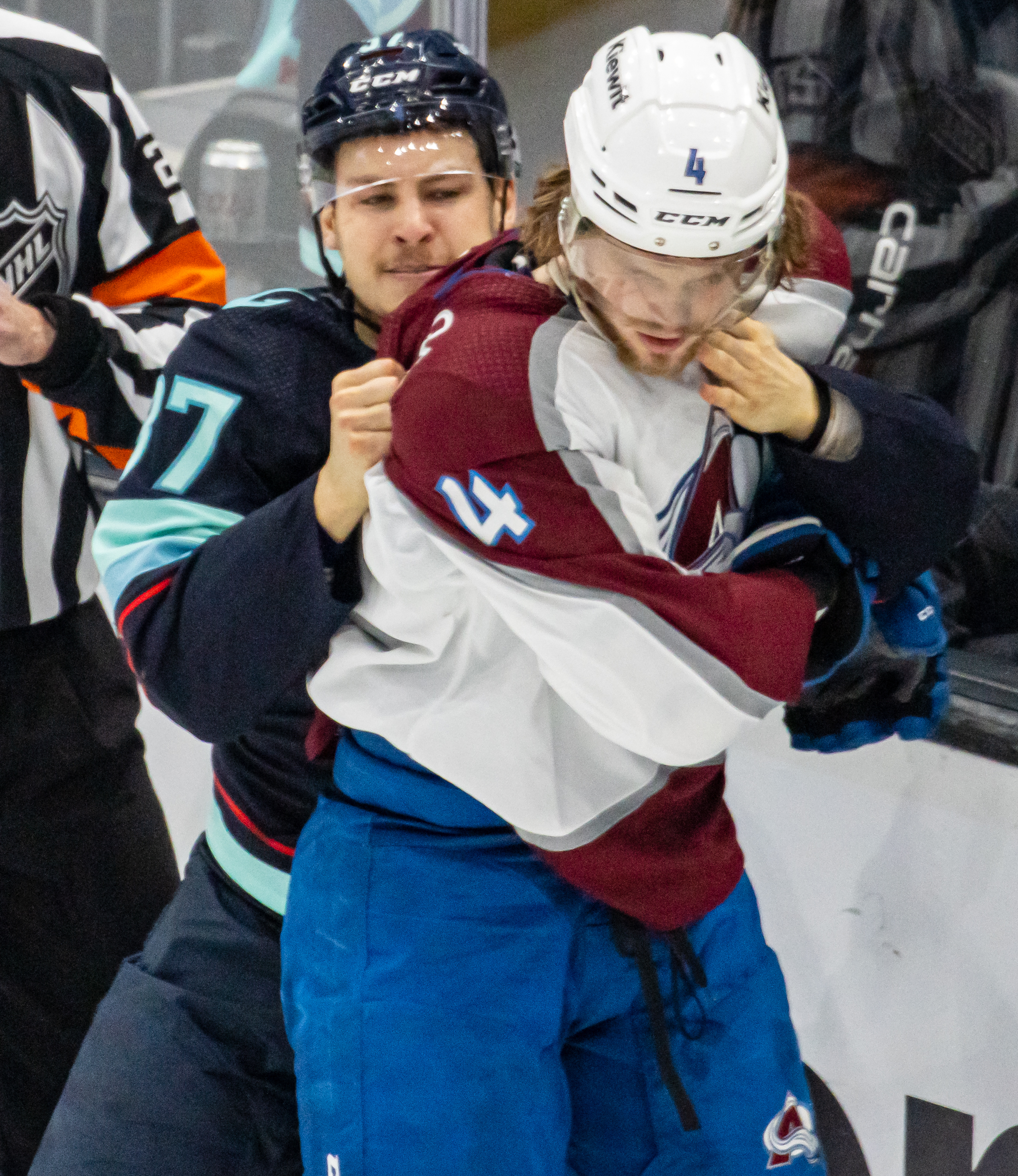
Byram fighting with Yanni Gourde during the 2023 Stanley Cup playoffs.

Byram scored his first NHL goal in the opening game of the 2021–22 season, scoring on Marc-André Fleury of the Chicago Blackhawks en route to a 4–2 win on October 13, 2021. The following month, he sustained his third concussion of the 2021 calendar year after taking an elbow to the head from Vancouver Canucks captain Bo Horvat. He returned briefly for two games at the end of November before going back on the injured reserve. Byram only returned in full on January 1, following a league-wide pause due to COVID-19 outbreaks among several NHL teams. Less than two weeks later, Byram, who was still dealing with lingering concussion symptoms, took a personal leave from the Avalanche. On March 31, the Avalanche sent Byram to the Colorado Eagles, their American Hockey League (AHL) affiliate, for conditioning. To re-acclimate Byram when he returned to the NHL, the Avalanche paired him with several different defencemen in the last 11 games of the regular season. He added five assists in that time, finishing the year with five goals and 17 points in 30 games. Playing beside veteran defenceman Erik Johnson, Byram was a break-out player for the Avalanche during the 2022 Stanley Cup playoffs, taking on a greater responsibility on defence when Sam Girard suffered a broken sternum during Colorado's second-round series against the St. Louis Blues. Byram recorded nine assists in 20 playoff games as the Colorado Avalanche were NHL champions, defeating the Tampa Bay Lightning in the 2022 Stanley Cup Final.

Byram began the 2022–23 NHL season on the second defensive pairing before suffering a lower-body injury during the Avalanche's November trip to New York. At the time of the injury, he had two goals and five points in ten games. The injury was originally deemed week-to-week, but Byram ultimately missed 38 games with what he described as a "finicky" injury. He returned to the line-up on February 8, for Colorado's first game after the 2023 NHL All-Star Game break. Upon his return, Byram took a more active approach on offence, leading to 18 points in his first 28 games back, including a three-game goal streak at the end of March. Playing in 42 regular season games, Byram recorded a career-high 10 goals and 24 points during the 2022–23 season. The Avalanche lost to the Seattle Kraken in the first round of the 2023 Stanley Cup playoffs, with Byram contributing three assists in seven postseason games.

On July 1, 2023, the Avalanche signed Byram, a restricted free agent, to a two-year, $7.7 million contract extension. Although his health improved in the 2023–24 NHL season, Byram's play struggled, with his scoring diminished and penalty minutes increasing. A natural left-side defenceman, he struggled with playing on Girard's right. Byram missed eight games in January with a lower-body injury, which he took as an opportunity to "sit back and watch for a bit" and reset his uneven season. Paired at times with Girard, Cale Makar, Josh Manson, and Jack Johnson, Byram recorded eight goals and 20 points in 55 games that season with Colorado.

==== Buffalo Sabres (2024–2026) ====
On March 6, 2024, the Avalanche traded Byram to the Buffalo Sabres in exchange for centre Casey Mittelstadt. Sabres general manager Kevyn Adams had spent considerable time looking for a young, top-rated defenceman, and when Colorado acquired Sean Walker from the Philadelphia Flyers, they were willing to move Byram. Byram made his Sabres debut on March 7, recording an assist in their 4–2 loss to the Nashville Predators. The trade reunited Byram with childhood friends Dylan Cozens and Peyton Krebs, and he referred to the new environment as "a breath of fresh air". He became the first Sabres defenceman to record three or more goals in their first three games with the team after he scored a goal against the Nashville Predators on March 7 and two goals against the Detroit Red Wings on March 12. In 18 games with the Sabres, Byram recorded three goals and nine points, including a three-game point streak to end the year.

During the 2026 Stanley Cup playoffs, Byram became the first Sabres defenceman since Ken Sutton in 1993 to score a goal in three straight playoff games, doing so in Games 2, 3, and 4 of the Sabres' first-round series against the Boston Bruins.

==== Chicago Blackhawks (2026–present) ====
On June 23, 2026, the Sabres traded Byram and Jordan Greenway to the Chicago Blackhawks in exchange for Louis Crevier, the 4th, and the 45th overall pick in the 2026 NHL entry draft. He later signed a six-year, $75 million extension beginning in the 2027–28 season with the Blackhawks on July 1, becoming the highest paid defenceman in the NHL.

== International play ==
Medal record

Men's ice hockey

Representing Canada

World Junior Championships
Gold medal – first place	2020 Czech Republic	
Silver medal – second place	2021 Canada	

Hlinka Gretzky Cup
Gold medal – first place	2018 Alberta	

World U-17 Hockey Challenge
Silver medal – second place	2017 British Columbia	

Byram first represented Canada internationally as a member of the national under-18 team at the 2017 World U-17 Hockey Challenge, where he scored one goal and four assists in six games with the Canada Red team, which ultimately came in second place to the undefeated United States team. After the tournament, Byram was one of five players named to that year's All-Star team. The following year, he was one of three players born in 2001 to join Canada for the 2018 IIHF World U18 Championships in Russia. After recording only one assist in Canada's fifth-place finish, Byram received his first gold medal with one goal and three assists in five games of the 2018 Hlinka Gretzky Cup.

Following his performance in these under-18 tournaments, Byram was named to the Canadian junior team for the 2020 World Junior Ice Hockey Championships. where he recorded two assists in seven games and took home another gold medal. The following year, he was initially named an alternate captain for the 2021 World Junior Ice Hockey Championships, but a wrist injury to captain Kirby Dach promoted Byram and Dylan Cozens to the role. With one goal and five points in seven games, Byram helped Canada to capture second place and was named to the Media All-Star team.

With Buffalo not qualifying for the 2024 Stanley Cup playoffs, Byram was one of three Sabres players to represent the Canada men's national ice hockey team at the 2024 IIHF World Championship in Czechia. Byram recorded one goal and five points in nine games as Canada finished in fourth place, falling 4–2 to the Swedish national team in the bronze-medal match.

== Personal life ==
Byram and his father are avid outdoorsmen and recreational hunters. Outside of hockey, he also enjoys watching baseball and basketball.

== Career statistics ==
=== Regular season and playoffs ===
			Regular season					Playoffs
Season	Team	League	GP	G	A	Pts	PIM	GP	G	A	Pts	PIM
2014–15	Lethbridge Golden Hawks	AMBHL	33	12	15	27	40	4	1	1	2	10
2015–16	Lethbridge Golden Hawks	AMBHL	34	22	37	59	32	12	5	7	12	12
2016–17	Lethbridge Hurricanes Midget AAA	AMHL	8	3	5	8	6	—	—	—	—	—
2016–17	Vancouver Giants	WHL	11	0	0	0	8	—	—	—	—	—
2017–18	Vancouver Giants	WHL	60	6	21	27	52	7	3	4	7	6
2018–19	Vancouver Giants	WHL	67	26	45	71	80	22	8	18	26	18
2019–20	Vancouver Giants	WHL	50	14	38	52	76	—	—	—	—	—
2020–21	Colorado Avalanche	NHL	19	0	2	2	23	—	—	—	—	—
2021–22	Colorado Avalanche	NHL	30	5	12	17	12	20	0	9	9	10
2021–22	Colorado Eagles	AHL	2	0	0	0	2	—	—	—	—	—
2022–23	Colorado Avalanche	NHL	42	10	14	24	38	7	0	3	3	0
2023–24	Colorado Avalanche	NHL	55	8	12	20	40	—	—	—	—	—
2023–24	Buffalo Sabres	NHL	18	3	6	9	13	—	—	—	—	—
2024–25	Buffalo Sabres	NHL	82	7	31	38	46	—	—	—	—	—
2025–26	Buffalo Sabres	NHL	82	11	31	42	48	13	4	3	7	12
NHL totals			328	44	108	152	220	40	4	15	19	22

=== International ===
Year	Team	Event	Result	GP	G	A	Pts	PIM
2017	Canada Red	U17	2nd place, silver medalist(s)	6	1	4	5	2
2018	Canada	U18	5th	5	0	1	1	0
2018	Canada	HG18	1st place, gold medalist(s)	5	1	3	4	8
2020	Canada	WJC	1st place, gold medalist(s)	7	0	2	2	0
2021	Canada	WJC	2nd place, silver medalist(s)	7	1	4	5	0
2024	Canada	WC	4th	9	1	4	5	27
Junior totals				30	3	14	17	10
Senior totals				9	1	4	5	27

== Awards and honours ==
Award	Year
WHL
Western Conference Rookie of the Year	2018
Sherwin-Williams Top Prospects Game	2019
CHL Top Draft Prospect Award	2019
Western Conference First All-Star Team	2019
Western Conference Second All-Star Team	2020
NHL
Stanley Cup champion	2022
International
U-17 All-Star Team	2017
World Juniors Media All-Star	2021

Awards and achievements
Preceded by Martin Kaut	Colorado Avalanche first-round draft pick 2019	Succeeded by Alex Newhook
