= Bob Halkidis =

Canadian ice hockey player

- Born: March 5, 1966 (age 60) Toronto, Ontario, Canada
- Height: 5 ft 11 in (180 cm)
- Weight: 205 lb (93 kg; 14 st 9 lb)
- Position: Defence
- Shot: Left
- Played for: NHL; Buffalo Sabres; Los Angeles Kings; Toronto Maple Leafs; Detroit Red Wings; Tampa Bay Lightning; New York Islanders; ECHL; Greensboro Generals; UHL; Winston-Salem IceHawks; SM-liiga; HIFK; DEL; Kölner Haie; BISL; Newcastle Jesters; RSL; SKA St. Petersburg
- NHL draft: 81st overall, 1984; Buffalo Sabres
- Playing career: 1985–2001

Robert H. Halkidis (born March 5, 1966) is a Canadian former professional ice hockey player.

== Playing career ==
As a youth, Halkidis played in the 1979 Quebec International Pee-Wee Hockey Tournament with a minor ice hockey team from Toronto.

After a junior hockey career with the London Knights in which he won the Max Kaminsky Trophy as outstanding defenceman in 1984–85, Halkidis joined the Buffalo Sabres. During his career he also played for the Los Angeles Kings, Toronto Maple Leafs, Detroit Red Wings, Tampa Bay Lightning, New York Islanders and HIFK. In 1998 Halkidis won the Finnish championship with HIFK and was very popular among fans due to his rough and uncompromising style of play. Known more as a defensive defenceman, Halkidis recorded 8 goals and 32 assists over 256 NHL games.

== Personal life ==
He retired in 2001, and now runs a hockey training and coaching development business. He is currently a pro scout for the Columbus Blue Jackets.

His son, Beau, is an NHL/AHL referee. He made his NHL debut on April 1, 2019.

== Career statistics ==
=== Regular season and playoffs ===
			Regular season					Playoffs
Season	Team	League	GP	G	A	Pts	PIM	GP	G	A	Pts	PIM
1982–83	London Knights	OHL	37	3	12	15	52	3	0	1	1	8
1983–84	London Knights	OHL	51	9	22	31	123	8	0	2	2	27
1984–85	London Knights	OHL	62	14	50	64	154	8	3	6	9	22
1984–85	Buffalo Sabres	NHL	—	—	—	—	—	4	0	0	0	19
1985–86	Buffalo Sabres	NHL	37	1	9	10	115	—	—	—	—	—
1986–87	Rochester Americans	AHL	59	1	8	9	144	8	0	0	0	43
1986–87	Buffalo Sabres	NHL	6	1	1	2	19	—	—	—	—	—
1987–88	Rochester Americans	AHL	15	2	5	7	50	—	—	—	—	—
1987–88	Buffalo Sabres	NHL	30	0	3	3	115	4	0	0	0	22
1988–89	Rochester Americans	AHL	16	0	6	6	64	—	—	—	—	—
1988–89	Buffalo Sabres	NHL	16	0	1	1	66	—	—	—	—	—
1989–90	Rochester Americans	AHL	18	1	13	14	70	—	—	—	—	—
1989–90	New Haven Nighthawks	AHL	30	3	17	20	67	—	—	—	—	—
1989–90	Los Angeles Kings	NHL	20	0	4	4	56	8	0	1	1	8
1990–91	Phoenix Roadrunners	IHL	4	1	5	6	6	—	—	—	—	—
1990–91	New Haven Nighthawks	AHL	7	1	3	4	10	—	—	—	—	—
1990–91	Los Angeles Kings	NHL	34	1	3	4	133	—	—	—	—	—
1991–92	Toronto Maple Leafs	NHL	46	3	3	6	145	—	—	—	—	—
1992–93	Milwaukee Admirals	IHL	26	0	9	9	79	5	0	1	1	27
1992–93	St. John's Maple Leafs	AHL	29	2	13	15	61	—	—	—	—	—
1993–94	Adirondack Red Wings	AHL	15	0	6	6	46	—	—	—	—	—
1993–94	Detroit Red Wings	NHL	28	1	4	5	93	1	0	0	0	2
1994–95	Detroit Red Wings	NHL	4	0	1	1	6	—	—	—	—	—
1994–95	Tampa Bay Lightning	NHL	27	1	3	4	40	—	—	—	—	—
1995–96	Atlanta Knights	IHL	21	1	7	8	62	—	—	—	—	—
1995–96	Indianapolis Ice	IHL	3	0	2	2	8	—	—	—	—	—
1995–96	Utah Grizzlies	IHL	27	0	7	7	72	12	1	1	2	36
1995–96	Tampa Bay Lightning	NHL	3	0	0	0	7	—	—	—	—	—
1995–96	New York Islanders	NHL	5	0	0	0	30	—	—	—	—	—
1996–97	Carolina Monarchs	AHL	41	5	13	18	47	—	—	—	—	—
1997–98	HIFK Helsinki	SM-l	29	1	6	7	133	9	0	2	2	14
1997–98	Winston-Salem IceHawks	UHL	3	0	1	1	15	—	—	—	—	—
1998–99	Cologne Sharks	DEL	49	7	14	21	103	—	—	—	—	—
2000–01	Greensboro Generals	ECHL	33	1	6	7	50	—	—	—	—	—
2000–01	Newcastle Jesters	BISL	49	7	14	21	103	—	—	—	—	—
2000–01	SKA Saint Petersburg	RSL	9	0	2	2	10	—	—	—	—	—
NHL totals			256	8	32	40	825	20	0	1	1	51
