= Jan Mikel =

Czech ice hockey defenceman

- Born: 14 April 1975 (age 49); Brno, Czechoslovakia
- Height: 6 ft 1 in (185 cm)
- Weight: 231 lb (105 kg; 16 st 7 lb)
- Position: Defence
- Shot: Left
- Played for: SG Cortina; HC Milano Saima; Ayr Scottish Eagles; Brest Albatros Hockey; Vsetínská hokejová Dragons de Rouen
- Playing career: 1993–2012

Jan Mikel (born 14 April 1975) is a Czech former ice hockey defenceman.

== Career ==
Mikel played nine games for Vsetínská hokejová of the Czech Extraliga during the 2004–05 season. He had previously played in Italy's Serie A for SG Cortina and HC Milano Saima, the British Ice Hockey Superleague for the Ayr Scottish Eagles, the British National League for the Dundee Stars and the French Super 16 for Brest Albatros Hockey.

Mikel returned to France in 2005 with Dragons de Rouen before playing the remainder of his career in the Czech 1. Liga for HC Kometa Brno and HC Olomouc. He retired in 2012 to become a coach for Kometa Brno's U20 team.

== Career statistics ==
			Regular season					Playoffs
Season	Team	League	GP	G	A	Pts	PIM	GP	G	A	Pts	PIM
1993–94	HC Královopolská Brno	Czech2	4	0	0	0	0	—	—	—	—	—
1994–95	Fresno Falcons	SuHL	16	0	5	5	22	—	—	—	—	—
1994–95	Fresno Falcons	PHL-Sr.	—	—	—	—	—	—	—	—	—	—
1995–96	Langley Thunder	BCHL	30	14	13	27	141	—	—	—	—	—
1996–97	Rochester Mustangs	USHL	—	—	—	—	—	3	1	1	2	17
1996–97	SG Cortina	Italy2	35	19	15	34	133	—	—	—	—	—
1997–98	SG Cortina	Italy	32	8	16	24	80	—	—	—	—	—
1998–99	HC Milano Bears	Alpenliga	30	5	9	14	71	—	—	—	—	—
1998–99	HC Milano Bears	Italy	21	5	3	8	88	—	—	—	—	—
1999–00	Ayr Scottish Eagles	BISL	41	9	11	20	74	7	0	1	1	8
2000–01	Ayr Scottish Eagles	BISL	48	10	17	27	60	5	1	1	2	2
2001–02	Dundee Stars	BNL	44	27	58	85	62	10	2	10	12	48
2002–03	Dundee Stars	BNL	31	10	21	31	70	8	1	8	9	8
2003–04	Brest Albatros Hockey	France	26	4	22	26	123	8	3	3	6	24
2004–05	Vsetínská hokejová	Czech	9	0	0	0	31	—	—	—	—	—
2004–05	HC Kometa Brno	Czech2	41	5	8	13	115	3	0	0	0	2
2005–06	Dragons de Rouen	Ligue Magnus	25	2	19	21	54	9	0	3	3	14
2006–07	HC Kometa Brno	Czech2	34	4	5	9	62	4	0	0	0	16
2007–08	HC Kometa Brno	Czech2	40	7	9	16	68	13	1	2	3	34
2008–09	HC Kometa Brno	Czech2	20	1	0	1	22	—	—	—	—	—
2008–09	HC Olomouc	Czech2	20	2	13	15	46	8	0	5	5	32
2009–10	HC Olomouc	Czech2	44	3	17	20	76	10	2	1	3	8
2010–11	HC Olomouc	Czech2	29	3	10	13	46	6	0	2	2	8
2011–12	HC Olomouc	Czech2	29	2	7	9	28	—	—	—	—	—
Czech2 totals			261	27	69	96	463	44	3	10	13	100
