= Craig Binns =

Canadian ice hockey player

- Born: July 18, 1974 (age 52) Ottawa, Ontario, Canada
- Height: 6 ft 4 in (193 cm)
- Weight: 225 lb (102 kg; 16 st 1 lb)
- Position: Defence
- Shot: Left
- Played for: ECHL; Columbus Chill; Mobile Mysticks; IHL; Chicago Wolves; WPHL; Lubbock Cotton Kings; BISL; Newcastle Jesters; CHL; Tulsa Oilers; Lubbock Cotton Kings
- NHL draft: Undrafted
- Playing career: 1994–2004

Craig Binns (born July 18, 1974) is a Canadian former professional ice hockey defenceman.

Binns played three seasons (1991 – 1994) of major junior hockey in the Ontario Hockey League, scoring 3 goals and 19 assists for 22 points while earning 260 penalty minutes in 168 games played.

Binns went on to play ten seasons of professional hockey, retiring after the 2003–04 season spent with the Lubbock Cotton Kings of the Central Hockey League.

Following his playing career, Binns settled in Midland, Texas, where he is now a fireman with the Midland Fire Department.

== Career statistics ==
			Regular season					Playoffs
Season	Team	League	GP	G	A	Pts	PIM	GP	G	A	Pts	PIM
1991–92	Windsor Spitfires	OHL	54	1	4	5	61	7	0	0	0	6
1992–93	Windsor Spitfires	OHL	3	1	0	1	14	—	—	—	—	—
1992–93	Belleville Bulls	OHL	22	0	1	1	37	—	—	—	—	—
1992–93	Owen Sound Platers	OHL	36	0	8	8	34	7	0	1	1	2
1993–94	Owen Sound Platers	OHL	53	1	6	7	114	9	0	1	1	16
1994–95	Columbus Chill	ECHL	48	7	10	17	110	3	0	1	1	4
1995–96	Columbus Chill	ECHL	3	0	1	1	2	—	—	—	—	—
1995–96	Mobile Mysticks	ECHL	41	1	18	19	99	—	—	—	—	—
1996–97	Mobile Mysticks	ECHL	65	1	10	11	217	—	—	—	—	—
1997–98	Mobile Mysticks	ECHL	3	0	0	0	2	—	—	—	—	—
1997–98	Chicago Wolves	IHL	37	1	3	4	56	—	—	—	—	—
1998–99	Mobile Mysticks	ECHL	53	0	8	8	94	2	0	0	0	2
1999–00	Lubbock Cotton Kings	WPHL	67	9	19	28	66	7	0	1	1	20
2000–01	Newcastle Jesters	BISL	43	3	8	11	28	—	—	—	—	—
2001–02	Tulsa Oilers	CHL	51	3	10	13	107	—	—	—	—	—
2002–03	Lubbock Cotton Kings	CHL	35	3	5	8	33	—	—	—	—	—
2003–04	Lubbock Cotton Kings	CHL	62	5	11	16	112	—	—	—	—	—
ECHL totals			213	9	47	56	524	5	0	1	1	6
