= Rob Pyne (Canadian football) =

Canadian football player (b. 1950)

- Born: August 13, 1950 (age 75); Regina, Saskatchewan
- Education: Tulsa University, University of Regina
- Occupation: Retired Professional Athlete
- Years active: 1972 to 1975

Rob Pyne (born August 13, 1950) is a former Canadian football player who played for the Saskatchewan Roughriders, Winnipeg Blue Bombers, and Calgary Stampeders from 1972 through 1974. He played for the Regina Rams in the Canadian Junior Football League from 1969 to 1971, during which time the Rams won two National Junior Football Championships (1970 and 1971). He attended Luther College high school in Regina, Saskatchewan where he excelled at Basketball and Football.
