= Luther College (Saskatchewan) =

College in Regina, Saskatchewan, Canada

Luther College at the University of Regina
- Type: Federated college of the University of Regina
- Established: 1971
- Affiliations: University of Regina, UACC
- President: Dr. Tom Phenix
- Dean: Dr. Derrek Eberts
- Faculty: 300 employees over both campuses
- Students: Approx. 1000
- Location: Regina, Saskatchewan, Canada
- Campus: urban at the University of Regina
- Colours: White and Blue
- Website: https://www.luthercollege.edu/university

Luther College is a university college and high school located in Regina, Saskatchewan, Canada. The university campus of Luther College is located on the campus of the University of Regina and serves as a federated college of the university. The high school is located at 1500 Royal Street. There are approximately 1000 students and 300 employees at Luther College with an approximately $20.1M budget across both campuses. As a federated college, Luther College is administratively and financially independent, but academically integrated with the University of Regina. Luther students will earn a University of Regina degree when they graduate.

== History ==
Luther College was founded in 1913 as Luther Academy, with classrooms and dormitory space for 32 male students in Melville, Saskatchewan. Women first enrolled as non-residential students in 1920. In 1926, the school relocated to a larger campus in Regina at 1500 Royal Street and began offering university level courses. The College used to be officially affiliated with the University of Saskatchewan until 1968, and opened a University campus including academic and residence buildings on the University of Regina campus in 1971. The High School continues to occupy the 1926 campus at 1500 Royal Street.

== Governance and administration ==
Luther College, established in Regina in 1926, is incorporated in the Province of Saskatchewan under legislation enacted in 1969, amended in 1996, and replaced by a new Luther College Act in 2018. The business of Luther College, Regina is administratively independent and governed by a volunteer Board of Regents elected by the corporation of Luther College. The President of Luther College, Regina is accountable to the Board of Regents.

The management and supervision (the administration) of Luther College, Regina is entrusted to the President of Luther College, Regina with the assistance of a College Leadership Group. The division of roles and responsibilities of the Board of Regents and the administration is detailed in the Board Operating Guidelines. The President of Luther College, Regina is accountable to the Board of Regents.

== Luther College High School ==
=== IB Program ===
Luther College High School offers the IB diploma programme. Students have the option to take the full IB diploma or IB courses to their selection. The programme is open to all students and there are no entrance exams or minimum averages required. Although there are required pre-requisite courses for entering taking IB courses. Typically, the prerequisite courses are the regular Saskatchewan grade 10 courses that correspond to the IB level courses (ex. science 10 is needed for IB chemistry). However, IB Math and French are an exception. IB math requires pre-IB math 10 to be taken. IB French requires French 10 and 20 or Français immersion 10 to be taken. The mean IB diploma score at Luther College High School is 33/45 points. The IB programme coordinator is currently Sarah Stone.

==== Group 1 ====
- English A: Literature (HL)
- Language A: Literature self study (SL/HL)

==== Group 2 ====
- French B (SL)
- German ab initio (SL)

==== Group 3 ====
- History of the Americas (HL)
- Environmental Systems and Societies (SL)

==== Group 4 ====
- Biology (HL)
- Chemistry (SL)

==== Group 5 ====
- Mathematics: Analysis and Approaches (SL)

==== Group 6 ====
- Visual Arts (SL)
- Film (SL)
- Theatre (SL)

==== Discontinued IB subjects ====
- IB Math HL: Students who were enrolled in IB Math SL used to be given the option to study and write the IB Math HL exam. This was discontinued because students taking the HL exam were not receiving 240 hours of instruction, as required for HL subjects by the IB. This was a violation of the policy of IB and thus was ordered to be discontinued by IB.
- IB French B HL: The same reason for being discontinued as IB Math HL

Luther College High School
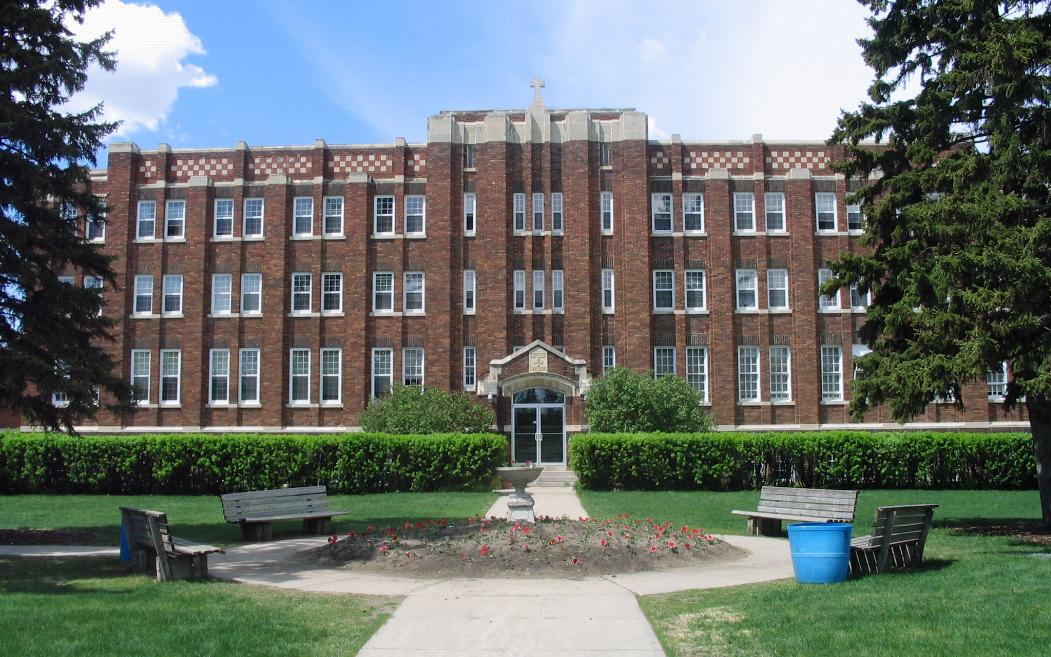

Location
- 1500 Royal Street; Regina, Saskatchewan, S4T 5A5; Canada; 50.45454°N 104.65243°W

Information
- School type: High School
- Motto: Luther College Makes transformative change for a more grace-filled, just, and joyful world
- Religious affiliation: Lutheran
- Founded: 1913 (in Melville). Moved to present-day campus in 1926.
- School board: Private
- President: Dr. Tom Phenix
- Principal: Nora Marpole
- Grades: 9-12
- Enrollment: 407 (2023)
- Language: English
- Area: Regina
- Colours: Black and Gold
- Team name: Lions
- Website: www.luthercollege.edu/highschool

== Athletics ==
Luther College High School has a history of athletics. The school has a variety of sports offered including football, golf, volleyball, soccer, basketball, curling, hockey, cross country running, and track and field. The school is home to Luther Invitational Tournament (L.I.T.), one of the longest-running basketball tournaments in Western Canada. L.I.T. has been held annually in February since 1953. Luther as host team has played in every L.I.T. except one, winning four titles in 1953, 1984, 1990 and 2006. The high school’s basketball team won a provincial basketball championship in 1968. The high school's AAA football team won city titles in 1981, 1993, 2005, and 2014, as well as provincial titles in 1981, 1993 and 2005. In 2010, the Luther Lions won the 5A Regina Basketball City Championships. In 2016 the boys won the small school soccer city final, and, in 2019, the provincial championship.

== Notable alumni ==
- Andrea Ludwig, 1988 high school alumnus, Mezzo Soprano Opera Singer and Actress
- Rob Pyne, 1967 high school alumnus, Professional Canadian Football League Player (CFL)
- Glenda Goertzen, 1989 college alumnus, author
- Henry Taube, 1933 high school alumnus, winner of the 1983 Nobel Prize in Chemistry
- Jade Etienne, 2007 high school alumnus, Professional Canadian Football League Player (CFL)
- Patrick Neufeld, 2006 high school alumnus, Professional Canadian Football League Player (CFL)
- Jonathan Denis, 1993 high school alumnus, Alberta MLA and Minister of Housing and Urban Affairs
- Nevin Markwart, 1982 high school alumnus, Professional Ice Hockey Player (NHL)
- Jim Mathieson, 1988 high school alumnus, Professional Ice Hockey Player (NHL)
- Selmar Odelein, 1985 high school alumnus, Professional Ice Hockey Player (NHL)
- Joan Douglas, 1957 high school alumnus, daughter of then premier Tommy Douglas, nurse
- Maureen Rever, 1955 high school alumnus, Canadian Olympic 100 meter sprinter
- James Balfour, 1945 high school alumnus, Canadian Politician and Senator
- Jack Wiebe, 1953 high school alumnus, Canadian Politician, 18th Lieutenant Governor of Saskatchewan
- James Wilfrid Gardiner, 1941 high school alumnus, Canadian Politician
- Robert Steadward, 1964 high school alumnus, Founding President of the International Paralympic Committee (IPC)

== See also ==
- Higher education in Saskatchewan
- List of agricultural universities and colleges
- List of colleges in Canada § Saskatchewan
