= Ayr Scottish Eagles =

- City: Ayr, Scotland
- League: Ice Hockey Superleague
- Founded: 1996
- Operated: 1996–2003
- Home arena: Centrum Arena
- Colors: Green and Orange
- Owner(s): (Scotland) William James Barr OBE FICE
- Head coach: (Scotland) Paul Heavey
- Affiliate: Barr Construction Ltd

Franchise history
- 1996–2002: Ayr Scottish Eagles
- 2002–03: Scottish Eagles

Championships
- Regular season titles: 1997–98
- Autumn Cups: 1997–98
- Challenge Cups: 1997–98, 2001–02
- Playoff championships: 1997–98

The Ayr Scottish Eagles were a professional Scottish ice hockey club, from Ayr, Scotland. They were formed in 1996 and played their home games at the Centrum Arena. The team competed in the Ice Hockey Superleague and the club's main (title) sponsor was Barr Construction. The club folded during the 2002–03 season after a move to Braehead Arena.

== History ==
The Ayr Scottish Eagles were founded in 1996 and played in the Ice Hockey Superleague. The team quickly rose to become one of the top teams in the United Kingdom, due in part to achieving the grand slam in their second season (1997–98) winning all four major UK ice hockey trophies, these were the British Championship, Superleague, the Autumn Cup and Express Cup, the first team ever to do so during the existence of the Ice Hockey Superleague. Also in 1998 they achieved great success (for a British team), when they twice defeated Ak Bars Kazan in the European Hockey League.

=== 2002–03 ===
In August 2002, it was announced by owner Bill Barr that the team were to permanently relocate to the Braehead Arena in Renfrewshire, outside Glasgow.

Bob Zeller, Belfast Giants' founder was announced as managing director and the team changed their name to Scottish Eagles, dropping Ayr from their name. Bob Zeller remained a shareholder in the Belfast Giants. The reason given for the relocation was due to the Braehead Arena having a larger seating capacity and a larger catchment area, expected to increase the fanbase of the club.

The club (with the new name) folded on 14 November 2002, after just six home games, in what was to become the final season of the Ice Hockey Superleague. They were the second team in the league to fold that season; the first being Manchester Storm.

=== Post demise ===
Friends of Eagles Hockey, organised an exhibition match at the Centrum Arena on 4 February 2003 as a fund raising event to raise funds for players and officials who had been left in financial difficulty due to the bankruptcy of Ice hockey Services Ltd, the Eagles operating company. The Eagles side was an all-star team that played against a UK select all-star team. The match officials were referee Moray Hanson and linesmen Alan Craig and Rab Cowan.

Eagles Roster
Number	Player
1	Ali Cree
2	Alan Campbell
3	Angelo Catenaro
4	Scott Young
5	Alan Schuler
9	Tony Hand
10	Todd Dutiaume
13	Dody Wood
14	Jonathan Weaver
16	David St. Pierre
20	Dan Ratushny
21	Karry Biette
22	Jan Mikel
27	Sam Groleau
30	Dino Bauba
31	Stephen Murphy
43	Paddy Ward

UK All-stars Roster
Number	Player
2	Stuart McCaig
4	Brent Pope
5	Rob Wilson
6	David Beatson
8	David Smith
9	John Downes
10	John Haig
11	Frank Evans
14	Adrain Saul
15	Paul Howes
16	Steven Kaye
17	Mark Morrison
22	Ivan Matulik
26	Mike Ware
30	Stevie Lyle
31	David Kennedy
44	Paul Ferone
47	Kurt Walsh

Friends of Eagles Hockey, campaigned for the return of ice hockey to the Centrum Arena after the Eagles's demise. Ice rink operators Planet Ice showed an interest in running the Centrum as an ice arena; however the arena was demolished in 2009 and the site is now home to a new supermarket.

=== Glasgow Clan ===
The Glasgow Clan ice hockey club are now based at the Braehead Arena and play in the Elite Ice Hockey They were originally called 'Braehead Clan'. In their first season, there was an effort to recruit former Ayr Scottish Eagles fans to the Clan support. Ayr Scottish Eagles fans who held a season ticket at Braehead in the 2002–03 season that was cut short due to the team folding were offered a season ticket in Glasgow's first season.

Although the Scottish Eagles and Braehead Clan were both based at the Braehead Arena, this is where the commonalities between the two ice hockey clubs end. The Scottish Eagles were operated by Ice Hockey Services Ltd which underwent a Voluntary Members Liquidation and was wound up on 23 June 2005. Braehead Clan is operated by Clan Entertainment Ltd that was Incorporated on 3 February 2010.

== Home arenas ==
The original home of the Eagles was the Centrum Arena. It was officially opened on 25 August 1996 and was run by Barr Leisure Limited, a subsidiary of Barr Holdings Ltd. The Eagles played their first home game there on 1 September 1996.

After an announcement by Bill Barr, the Eagles moved to the Braehead Arena for the 2002–03 season, where they played just six home games before folding. The Centrum was still used as a training venue throughout this period.

== Rosters ==
2002/03

Goaltenders
Number		Player	Catches	Acquired	Place of Birth
32	(Canada)	Mark Cavallin	L	2002	Mississauga, Ontario
1	(Canada)	Eoin McInerney	L	2002	London, Ontario

Defencemen
Number		Player	Shoots	Acquired	Place of Birth
3	(Canada)	Evan Marble	R	2002	Eston, Saskatchewan
17	(Canada)	Bob Quinnell	L	2002	Coquitlam, British Columbia
20	(Canada)	Dan Ratushny	R	2002	Nepean, Ontario
33	(Sweden)	Stefan Bergkvist	L	2002	Leksand, Sweden
9	(Scotland)	Scott Campbell	L	2002	Glasgow, Scotland

Forwards
Number		Player	Shoots	Position	Acquired	Place of Birth
10	(Canada)	Xavier Majic	L	C	2002	Fernie, British Columbia
14	(England)	Jonathan Weaver	L	LW	2000	Sunderland, England
29	(Canada)	Sean Selmser - C	L	LW	2002	Calgary, Alberta
18	(Sweden)	Johan Astrom	L	LW	2002	Boden, Sweden
16	(Canada)	Jeff Williams	L	LW	2002	Pointe-Claire, Quebec
28	(Canada)	Jason Bowen	L	LW	2002	Port Alice, British Columbia
12	(Canada)	Jeff Johnstone	R	RW	2002	Niagara Falls, Ontario
7	(Canada)	Jason Ruston	R	RW	2002	Victoria, British Columbia
21	(Finland)	Jonni Vauhkonen	L	RW	2002	Suonenjoki, Finland
19	(Canada)	Mike Harding	R	RW	2000	Edmonton, Alberta
16		John Downs			2002

2001/02

Goaltenders
Number		Player	Catches	Acquired	Place of Birth
8	(Scotland)	Colin Ryder	L	2000	Stirling, Scotland
41	(Canada)	Joaquin Gage	L	2001	London, Vancouver Columbia

Defencemen
Number		Player	Shoots	Acquired	Place of Birth
5	(Canada)	Alan Schuler - C	R	2001	100 Mile House, British Columbia
21	(Canada)	Ian Herbers	L	2001	Jasper, Alberta
3	(Canada)	Ryan Risidore	R	2001	Hamilton, Ontario
43	(Scotland)	Paddy Ward	R	2002	Kirkcaldy, Scotland
28	(Sweden)	Anders Hillström	L	2000	Sweden
41	(Sweden)	Johan Silfwerplatz	L	2000	Sweden

Forwards
Number		Player	Shoots	Position	Acquired	Place of Birth
17	(Canada)	Ed Courtenay	R	RW	2000	Verdun, Quebec
14	(England)	Jonathan Weaver	L	LW	2000	Sunderland, England
13	(Canada)	Dody Wood	L	LW	2001	Chetwynd, British Columbia
30	(Lithuania)	Dino Bauba	R	LW	2002	Kaunasc, Lithuania
16	(Canada)	Shawn Byram	L	LW	1997	Neepawa, Manitoba
27	(Canada)	Rhett Gordon	R	RW	2000	Regina, Saskatchewan
12	(Canada)	Mike Jickling	R	C	2001	Edmonton, Alberta
19	(Canada)	Mike Harding	R	RW	2000	Edmonton, Alberta
11	(Canada)	Cam Bristow	R	RW	2000	Saskatoon, Saskatchewan
	(Sweden)	Erik Norback	R	C	2001	Stockholm, Sweden
	(Sweden)	Johan Molin	R	RW	2001	Nacka, Sweden
	(Canada)	Phil Crowe	R	RW	2001	Nanton, Alberta

2000/01

Goaltenders
Number		Player	Catches	Acquired	Place of Birth
	(Canada)	Philippe DeRouville	L	2000	Victoriaville, Quebec
8	(Scotland)	Colin Ryder	L	2000	Stirling, Scotland

Defencemen
Number		Player	Shoots	Acquired	Place of Birth
	(Canada)	Travor Doyle	R	2000	Ottawa, Ontario
29	(Canada)	Derek Eberle - A	L	2000	Regina, Saskatchewan
21	(Czech Republic)	Jan Mikel	L	2000	Brno, Czech Republic
28	(Sweden)	Anders Hillstrom	L	2000	Sweden
41	(Sweden)	Johan Silfwerplatz	L	2000	Sweden

Forwards
Number		Player	Shoots	Position	Acquired	Place of Birth
	(Canada)	Debb Carpenter	R	RW	2000	Edmonton, Alberta
11	(Canada)	Cam Bristow	R	RW	1999	Saskatoon, Saskatchewan
	(Canada)	Rhett Gordon	R	RW	2000	Regina, Saskatchewan
	(United States)	Mike Harding	R	RW	2000	Edmonton, Alberta
	(Canada)	Ed Courtenay	R	RW	2000	Verdun, Quebec
7	(Scotland)	Tony Hand	R	C	1999	Edinburgh, Scotland
16	(Canada)	Shawn Byram - C	L	LW	1997	Neepawa, Manitoba
	(England)	Jonathan Weaver	L	LW	2000	Sunderland, England
	(Canada)	Teeder Wynne	L	F	2000	Calgary, Alberta
30	(Lithuania)	Dino Bauba	R	F	1997	Kaunasc, Lithuania
10	(Canada)	Mark Montanari	L	F	1997	Toronto, Ontario

1999/00

Goaltenders
Number		Player	Catches	Acquired	Place of Birth
31	(Canada)	Geoff Sarjeant	R	1999	Orilla, Ontario
33	(England)	Stephen Foster	L	1999	Durham, England
35	(Canada)	David Trofimenkoff	R	1999	Calgary, Alberta

Defencemen
Number		Player	Shoots	Acquired	Place of Birth
44	(Canada)	Kevin Pozzo	R	1999	Calgary, Alberta
24	(Canada)	Ryan Kummu	L	1996	Kitchener, Ontario
29	(Canada)	Jim Mathieson	L	1999	Kindersley, Saskatchewan
6	(Canada)	Vince Boe	L	1996	Calgary, Alberta
4	(Canada)	Scott Young	L	1996	Oakville, Ontario
44	(Canada)	Mike Bishop	L	1999	Sarnia, Ontario
5	(Belarus)	Yuri Krivokhija	L	1999	Minsk, Belarus
22	(Czech Republic)	Jan Mikel	L	1999	Brno, Czech Republic

Forwards
Number		Player	Shoots	Position	Acquired	Place of Birth
46	(Canada)	Rob Trumbley	R	RW	1999	Regina, Saskatchewan
11	(Canada)	Cam Bristow	R	RW	1999	Saskatoon, Saskatchewan
23	(Canada)	Yves Heroux	R	RW	1999	Terrebonne, Quebec
14	(United States)	John Varga	R	LW	1999	Chicago, Illinois
27	(Italy)	Patric Lochi	R	C	1999	Silandro, Italy
7	(Scotland)	Tony Hand	R	C	1999	Edinburgh, Scotland
16	(Canada)	Shawn Byram - C	L	LW	1997	Neepawa, Manitoba
15	(Canada)	Louis Dumont	R	C	1999	Calgary, Alberta
19	(Canada)	Shayne Stevenson	R	C	1999	Aurora, Ontario
30	(Lithuania)	Dino Bauba	R	F	1997	Kaunasc, Lithuania
9	(Canada)	Jamie Steer	R	F	1996	Winnipeg, Manitoba
10	(Canada)	Mark Montanari	L	F	1997	Toronto, Ontario
21	(Canada)	Eric Murano	R	C	1999	Calgary, Alberta

1998/99

Goaltenders
Number		Player	Catches	Acquired	Place of Birth
	(Canada)	Frank Caprice	R	1998	Hamilton, Ontario
	(Canada)	Sean Basilio	L	1998	Stoney Creek, Ontario
	(Canada)	Vincent Riendeau	L	1998	St. Hyacinthe, Quebec

Defencemen
Number		Player	Shoots	Acquired	Place of Birth
3	(Canada)	Angelo Catenaro - C	L	1996	Toronto, Ontario
24	(Canada)	Ryan Kummu	L	1996	Kitchener, Ontario
5	(Canada)	Alan Schuler	R	1996	100 Mile House, British Columbia
6	(Canada)	Vince Boe	L	1996	Calgary, Alberta
4	(Canada)	Scott Young	L	1996	Oakville, Ontario
	(Canada)	Trevor Burgess	R	1996	Carleton Place, Ontario

Forwards
Number		Player	Shoots	Position	Acquired	Place of Birth
17	(Canada)	David St. Pierre	R	C	1996	Montreal, Quebec
23	(Canada)	Jeff Hoad	R	C	1997	Brandon, Manitoba
23	(Canada)	Karry Biette	R	C	1997	Estevan, Saskatchewan
12	(United States)	Matt Hoffman	R	C	1996	Saginaw, Michigan
7	(Canada)	John Parco - A	L	C	1997	Sault Ste. Marie, Ontario
27	(Canada)	Samuel Groleau	R	C	1996	Longueuil, Quebec
16	(Canada)	Shawn Byram	L	LW	1997	Neepawa, Manitoba
19	(Canada)	Dennis Purdie	R	RW	1997	Amherstburg, Ontario
8	(Canada)	Mark Woolf - A	R	RW	1996	Brandon, Manitoba
30	(Lithuania)	Dino Bauba	R	F	1997	Kaunasc, Lithuania
9	(Canada)	Jamie Steer	R	F	1996	Winnipeg, Manitoba
10	(Canada)	Mark Montanari	L	F	1997	Toronto, Ontario
	(Canada)	Corey Lyons	L	RW	1997	Calgary, Alberta

1997/98

Goaltenders
Number		Player	Catches	Acquired	Place of Birth
32	(Canada)	Rob Dopson	L	1997	Smiths Falls, Ontario
34	(Canada)	Colum Cavilla	L	1996	Lethbridge, Alberta

Defencemen
Number		Player	Shoots	Acquired	Place of Birth
44	(Canada)	Joey Mittelsteadt	L	1997	Scarborough, Ontario
3	(Canada)	Angelo Catenaro - C	L	1996	Toronto, Ontario
24	(Canada)	Ryan Kummu	L	1996	Kitchener, Ontario
5	(Canada)	Alan Schuler	R	1996	100 Mile House, British Columbia
6	(Canada)	Vince Boe	L	1996	Calgary, Alberta
4	(Canada)	Scott Young	L	1996	Oakville, Ontario

Forwards
Number		Player	Shoots	Position	Acquired	Place of Birth
17	(Canada)	David St. Pierre	R	C	1996	Montreal, Quebec
23	(Canada)	Jeff Hoad	R	C	1997	Brandon, Manitoba
23	(Canada)	Karry Biette	R	C	1997	Estevan, Saskatchewan
12	(United States)	Matt Hoffman	R	C	1996	Saginaw, Michigan
7	(Canada)	John Parco - A	L	C	1997	Sault Ste. Marie, Ontario
27	(Canada)	Samuel Groleau	R	C	1996	Longueuil, Quebec
16	(Canada)	Shawn Byram	L	LW	1997	Neepawa, Manitoba
25	(Canada)	Darren Colbourne	L	RW	1997	Cornerbrook, Newfoundland Labrador
19	(Canada)	Dennis Purdie	R	RW	1997	Amherstburg, Ontario
8	(Canada)	Mark Woolf - A	R	RW	1996	Brandon, Manitoba
30	(Lithuania)	Dino Bauba	R	F	1997	Kaunasc, Lithuania
9	(Canada)	Jamie Steer	R	F	1996	Winnipeg, Manitoba
10	(Canada)	Mark Montanari	L	F	1997	Toronto, Ontario

1996/97

Goaltenders
Number		Player	Catches	Acquired	Place of Birth
40	(Canada)	Sven Rampf	R	1996	Pfronten, Germany
24	(Canada)	Colum Cavilla	L	1996	Lethbridge, Alberta

Defencemen
Number		Player	Shoots	Acquired	Place of Birth
7	(Scotland)	Colin McHaffie	R	1996	Ayr, Scotland
3	(Canada)	Angelo Catenaro - C	L	1996	Toronto, Ontario
24	(Canada)	Ryan Kummu	L	1996	Kitchener, Ontario
5	(Canada)	Alan Schuler	R	1996	100 Mile House, British Columbia
44	(Czech Republic)	Frantisek Prochazka	L	1996	Brno, Czech Republic
4	(Canada)	Scott Young	L	1996	Oakville, Ontario
6	(Canada)	Vince Boe	L	1996	Calgary, Alberta

Forwards
Number		Player	Shoots	Position	Acquired	Place of Birth
17	(Canada)	David St. Pierre	R	C	1996	Montreal, Quebec
15	(United States)	Brendan Flynn	L	C	1996	Boston, Massachusetts
23	(Czech Republic)	Jiri Lala	L	F	1996	Tabor, Czech Republic
12	(United States)	Matt Hoffman	R	C	1996	Saginaw, Michigan
21	(Germany)	Markus Berwanger	L	F	1996	Rosenheim, Germany
27	(Canada)	Samuel Groleau	R	C	1996	Longueuil, Quebec
	(Scotland)	Steven Lynch	R	F	1996	Kirkcaldy, Scotland
	(Canada)	Mark Cupolo	L	LW	1996	Niagara Falls, Ontario
19	(Canada)	Scott Morrison	R	RW	1996	Hamilton, Ontario
8	(Canada)	Mark Woolf	R	RW	1996	Brandon, Manitoba
9	(Canada)	Jamie Steer	R	F	1996	Winnipeg, Manitoba

Coaching Staff
Number		Player	Position	Dates	Place of Birth
--	(Scotland)	Paul Heavey	Head coach	2001-2003	Glasgow, Scotland
--	(Canada)	Scott Rex	Assistant coach	2001-2002	Brantford, Ontario
--	(Canada)	Jim Lynch	Head coach	1996-2001	Toronto, Ontario
--	(Scotland)	Paul Heavey	Assistant coach	2000-2001	Glasgow, Scotland
--	(Czech Republic)	Milan Figala	Assistant coach	1996-2000	Brno, South Moravian Region

== Club record ==
=== Season-by-season record ===
Ayr Scottish Eagles season-by-season record.

Season	League	GP	W	L	T	OTL	PTS	GF	GA	League Position
1996–97	Ice Hockey Superleague	42	21	15	6	0	48	171	157	3rd place, bronze medalist(s)
1997–98	Ice Hockey Superleague	45	34	6	2	3	73	200	113	1st place, gold medalist(s)
1998–99	Ice Hockey Superleague	42	18	18	3	3	42	136	140	5
1999–00	Ice Hockey Superleague	42	17	16	5	4	43	144	147	5
2000–01	Ice Hockey Superleague	48	25	22	0	1	72	161	158	5
2001–02	Ice Hockey Superleague	48	20	19	9	0	49	136	130	2nd place, silver medalist(s)
2002–03	Ice Hockey Superleague	8	2	6	0	0	4^{†}	20	34	--

Note: GP = Games played; W = Wins; L = Losses; T = Ties; OTL = Overtime losses; PTS = Points; GF = Goals for; GA = Goals against;
† = Club folded six games into the season

== Player records ==
=== Franchise scoring leaders ===
These are the top-ten point-scorers, scoring leaders and assists in franchise history.

Note: Pos = Position; GP = Games played; G = Goals; A = Assists; Pts = Points; P/G = Points per game

Points
Player	Pos	GP	G	A	Pts	P/G
(Canada) Shawn Byram	F	200	63	123	186	0.93
(Lithuania) Dino Bauba	F	189	54	84	138	0.73
(Canada) Scott Young	D	210	49	82	131	0.62
(Canada) Samuel Groleau	F	120	56	66	122	1.02
(Canada) Mark Montanari	F	123	35	79	114	0.93
(Canada) Jamie Steer	F	156	61	49	110	0.70
(Canada) Mark Woolf	F	124	51	57	108	0.87
(Scotland) Tony Hand	F	86	27	71	98	1.13
(Canada) Ed Courtenay	F	91	41	48	89	0.98
(Canada) David St. Pierre	F	118	18	67	85	0.72

Goals
Player	Pos	G
(Canada) Shawn Byram	F	63
(Canada) Jamie Steer	F	61
(Canada) Samuel Groleau	F	56
(Lithuania) Dino Bauba	F	54
(Canada) Mark Woolf	F	51
(Canada) Scott Young	D	49
(Canada) Ed Courtenay	F	41
(Canada) Mark Montanari	F	35
(United States) Matt Hoffman	F	35
(England) Jonathan Weaver	D	32

Assists
Player	Pos	A
(Canada) Shawn Byram	F	123
(Lithuania) Dino Bauba	F	84
(Canada) Scott Young	D	82
(Canada) Mark Montanari	F	79
(Canada) Alan Schuler	D	72
(Scotland) Tony Hand	F	71
(Canada) David St. Pierre	F	67
(Canada) Samuel Groleau	F	66
(Canada) Mark Woolf	F	57
(Canada) Vince Boe	D	50

=== Team captains ===
- Angelo Catenaro, 1996–99
- Shawn Byram, 1999–2001
- Alan Schuler, 2001–02
- Sean Selmser, 2002–03

=== NHL alumni ===
Many of Ayr's players were NHL draft picks and played in the NHL before signing for the Ayr Eagles.

Edmonton Oilers

- Joaquin Gage (94–96 & 00–01)
- Ian Herbers (93–94)
- Jason Bowen (92–97)

Pittsburgh Penguins

- Philippe DeRouville (95–97)
- Rob Dopson (93–94)

St. Louis Blues

- Geoff Sarjeant (94–95)
- Vincent Riendeau (88–92)

San Jose Sharks

- Geoff Sarjeant (95–96)
- Ed Courtenay (91–93)
- Dody Wood (92–93, 94–98)

Vancouver Canucks

- Frank Caprice (82-88)

Montreal Canadiens

- Vincent Riendeau (87-88)

Detroit Red Wings

- Vincent Riendeau (92–94)

Boston Bruins

- Vincent Riendeau (94–95)
- Shayne Stevenson (90–92)

Tampa Bay Lightning

- Ian Herbers (99–00)
- Shayne Stevenson (92–93)

New York Islanders

- Ian Herbers (99–00)
- Shawn Byram (90–91)

Philadelphia Flyers

- Jason Bowen (92–97)
- Phil Crowe (95–96)

Chicago Blackhawks

- Shawn Byram (91–92)

Los Angeles Kings

- Phil Crowe (93–94)

Ottawa Senators

- Phil Crowe (96–99)

=== International capped players ===
Several players were also selected to play for their national team in the Ice Hockey World Championships.

Canada

- Mark Cavallin (95–96)
- Joaquin Gage (99–00)
- Rob Dopson (98–99)
- Evan Marble (97–98)
- Dan Rutushny (88–92)
- Vince Boe (92–93)
- Trevor Burgess (94–95)
- Xavier Majic (96–97 & 99–00)
- Sean Selmer (96–98)
- Rhett Gordon (99–00)
- Cam Bristow (98–99)
- Yves Heroux (89–90)
- Jamie Steer (95–96)
- Eric Murano (89–90)
- David St Pierre (94–95)
- Corey Lyons (92–93)
- Darren Colbourne (89–90)

Belarus

- Yuri Krivokhiza (98–00)

Czechoslovakia

- Frantisek Prochazka (85–92 & 93–94 Czech Rep.)
- Jiri Lala (80-88)

Austria

- Sean Selmer (05–06)

Italy

- John Parco (02–10)
- Mark Cupolo (92–93)

West Germany

- Markus Berwanger (84-89 & 90–91 Germany)

== Honours and awards ==
British Championship
(gold) 1997–98 Winners

Superleague Winners
(gold) 1997–98 Winners
(silver) 2001–02 Runners-up

Benson and Hedges Cup
(silver) 1996–97 Runners-up
(gold) 1997–98 Winners
(silver) 1998–99 Runners-up

Express Cup
(gold) 1997–98 Winners
(silver) 2000–01 Runners-up
(gold) 2001–02 Winners

Coach of the Year Trophy

- Jim Lynch - 1996–97
- Jim Lynch - 1997–98

Player of the Year Trophy

- Rob Dopson - 1997–98

Sekonda Face to Watch

- Tony Hand - December 1999 – 2000
- Tony Hand - November 2000–01

Ice Hockey Annual Trophy

- Tony Hand - 1999–2000
- Tony Hand - 2000–01
- Jonathan Weaver - 2001–02

All Star First Team

- Rob Dopson - 1997–98
- Scott Young - 1997–98
- Mark Montanari - 1997–98
- Geoff Sarjeant - 1999–2000
- Tony Hand - 2000–01
- Johan Silfwerplatz - 2001–02

All Star Second Team

- Sam Groleau - 1997–98
- Joaquin Gage - 2001–02
- Alan Schuler - 2001–02
- Ed Courtenay - 2001–02

British Ice Hockey Hall of Fame

- Jim Lynch - inducted in 2001

Player of the Year Award

- Vince Boe - 1999–2000

== Jerseys ==
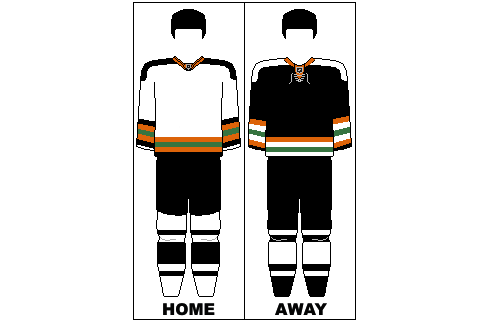
The inaugural uniform (1996–97 season)

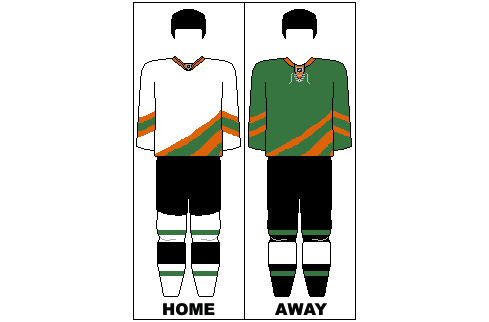
The uniform of the "grand slam" winning team (1997–98 season)

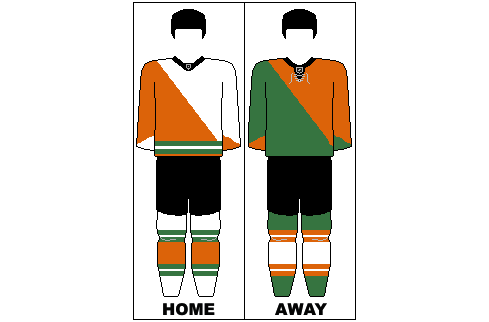
The uniform of the Express Cup runners-up (2000–01 season)

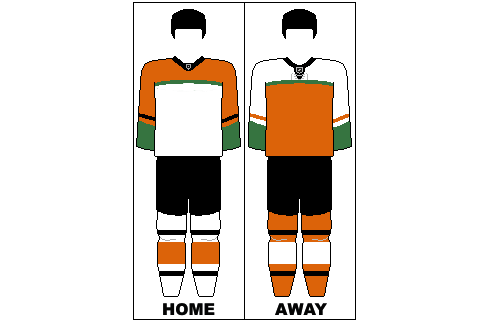
The uniform of the Express Cup winning team and Superleague Runners-up (2001–02 season)

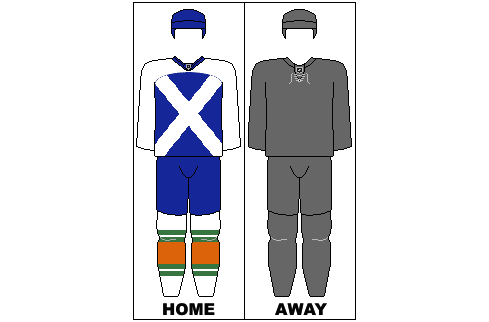
The last uniform to be worn by an Eagles side, in the exhibition match held at the Centrum in 2003 (there was no away jersey of this design)

== Notes ==
Preceded by Cardiff Devils	Superleague Champions; 1997–98	Succeeded by Manchester Storm
Preceded by Sheffield Steelers	Playoff Champions; 1997–98	Succeeded by Cardiff Devils
Preceded by Nottingham Panthers	Autumn Cup Winners; 1997–98	Succeeded by Nottingham Panthers
Preceded by Inaugural Champions	Challenge Cup Winners; 1997–98	Succeeded by Sheffield Steelers
Preceded by Sheffield Steelers	Challenge Cup Winners; 2001–02	Succeeded by Sheffield Steelers
