= 1996–97 ISL season =

- League: Ice Hockey Superleague
- Sport: Ice hockey

1996–97
- Benson & Hedges Cup: Nottingham Panthers
- League champions: Cardiff Devils
- Playoff champions: Sheffield Steelers

Seasons
- ← 1995–96 1997–98 →

The 1996–97 Ice Hockey Superleague season was the inaugural season of the Ice Hockey Superleague (ISL).

The league was formed by the owners of the Ayr Scottish Eagles, Basingstoke Bison, Bracknell Bees, Cardiff Devils, Manchester Storm, Newcastle Cobras, Nottingham Panthers and Sheffield Steelers. Ayr was the only new team with the rest of the teams having left the British Hockey League.

== Benson & Hedges Cup ==
The Benson & Hedges Cup consists of the teams from the ISL and the top teams from the British Hockey League. Sixteen teams in total were split into four regional groups playing each team in their group at home and away. The top two teams of each group then progressed to the quarter finals where the teams were paired off and the winning team on aggregate (after playing home and away) progressed to the semi finals. Again the winning team on aggregate progressed to the one-off final game held at Sheffield Arena.

=== Group A ===
Group A	GP	W	T	L	GF	GA	Pts
Ayr Scottish Eagles	6	5	1	0	48	14	11
Newcastle Cobras	6	4	1	1	43	16	9
Kingston Hawks	6	1	0	5	17	50	2
Telford Tigers	6	1	0	5	20	48	2

=== Group B ===
Group B	GP	W	T	L	GF	GA	Pts
Cardiff Devils	6	6	0	0	36	14	12
Manchester Storm	6	3	1	2	25	24	7
Slough Jets	6	1	2	3	19	30	4
Swindon Ice Lords	6	0	1	5	23	35	1

=== Group C ===
Group C	GP	W	T	L	GF	GA	Pts
Sheffield Steelers	6	5	0	1	46	13	10
Nottingham Panthers	6	4	1	1	46	23	9
Solihull Blaze	6	2	1	3	25	35	5
Peterborough Pirates	6	0	0	6	10	56	0

=== Group D ===
Group D	GP	W	T	L	GF	GA	Pts
Basingstoke Bison	6	6	0	0	43	11	12
Bracknell Bees	6	4	0	2	40	12	8
Guildford Flames	6	2	0	4	25	31	4
Medway Bears	6	0	0	6	9	63	0

=== Quarter-finals ===
Ayr Scottish Eagles vs Manchester Storm

- Manchester Storm 2-4 Ayr Scottish Eagles
- Ayr Scottish Eagles 3-2 Manchester Storm (Ayr win 7-4 on aggregate)

Basingstoke Bison vs Bracknell Bees

- Basingstoke Bison 5-3 Bracknell Bees
- Bracknell Bees 5-6 Basingstoke Bison (Basingstoke win 11-8 on aggregate)

Cardiff Devils vs Nottingham Panthers

- Nottingham Panthers 0-1 Cardiff Devils
- Cardiff Devils 3-4 Nottingham Panthers (after penalty shots, Nottingham win 5-4 on aggregate)

Sheffield Steelers vs Newcastle Cobras

- Newcastle Cobras 0-2 Sheffield Steelers
- Sheffield Steelers 6-3 Newcastle Cobras (Sheffield win 8-3 on aggregate)

=== Semi-finals ===
Nottingham Panthers vs Sheffield Steelers

- Sheffield Steelers 2-3 Nottingham Panthers
- Nottingham Panthers 3-1 Sheffield Steelers (Nottingham win 6-3 on aggregate)

Basingstoke Bison vs Ayr Scottish Eagles

- Ayr Scottish Eagles 0-2 Basingstoke Bison
- Basingstoke Bison 4-9 Ayr Scottish Eagles (Ayr win 9-6 on aggregate)

=== Final ===
The final took place at Sheffield Arena between Ayr Scottish Eagles and Nottingham Panthers.

- Ayr Scottish Eagles 3–5 Nottingham Panthers

== League ==
Each team played three home games and three away games against each of their opponents. All eight teams were entered into the playoffs.

Superleague	GP	W	T	OTL	L	GF	GA	Pts
Cardiff Devils	42	30	3	1	8	208	130	64
Sheffield Steelers	42	27	4	2	9	168	127	60
Ayr Scottish Eagles	42	21	6	0	15	171	157	48
Nottingham Panthers	42	21	1	2	18	160	147	45
Newcastle Cobras	42	17	2	5	18	158	172	41
Bracknell Bees	42	15	2	1	24	169	202	33
Manchester Storm	42	14	3	1	24	142	191	32
Basingstoke Bison	42	11	3	3	25	152	202	28

== Playoffs ==
All eight teams in the league took part in the playoffs. Group A consisted of Ayr, Cardiff, Manchester and Newcastle while Group B consisted of Basingstoke, Bracknell, Nottingham and Sheffield. The top two teams from each playoff group qualified for the playoff weekend at NYNEX Arena.

=== Group A ===
Group A	GP	W	T	OTL	L	GF	GA	Pts
Cardiff Devils	6	6	0	0	0	29	14	12
Ayr Scottish Eagles	6	3	0	0	3	24	22	6
Newcastle Cobras	6	2	0	0	4	16	23	4
Manchester Storm	6	1	0	0	5	11	21	2

=== Group B ===
Group B	GP	W	T	OTL	L	GF	GA	Pts
Nottingham Panthers	6	5	0	1	0	26	16	11
Sheffield Steelers	6	5	0	0	1	22	15	10
Basingstoke Bison	6	1	1	1	3	16	26	4
Bracknell Bees	6	0	1	1	4	16	23	2

=== Semi-finals ===
The finals weekend took place at NYNEX Arena in Manchester.

Winner A vs Runner-Up B

- Cardiff Devils 2-5 Sheffield Steelers

Winner B vs Runner-Up A

- Nottingham Panthers 6-5 Ayr Scottish Eagles (after overtime)

=== Final ===
Winner A vs Winner B

- Sheffield Steelers 3-1 Nottingham Panthers

== Awards ==
- Coach of the Year Trophy – Jim Lynch, Ayr Scottish Eagles
- Player of the Year Trophy – Stevie Lyle, Cardiff Devils
- Alan Weeks Trophy – Jason Stone, Cardiff Devils

=== All Star team ===
Pos	Player	Team
G	Steve Lyle	Cardiff Devils
D	Kip Noble	Cardiff Devils
D	Garth Premak	Nottingham Panthers
F	Paul Adey	Nottingham Panthers
F	Ivan Matulik	Cardiff Devils
F	Vezio Sacratini	Cardiff Devils
C	Justin Farkas	Nottingham Panthers

== Scoring leaders ==
- Most points: 60 Dale Junkin (Bracknell Bees)
- Most goals: 28 Paul Adey (Nottingham Panthers)
- Most assists: 37 Vezio Sacratini (Cardiff Devils)
- Most PIMs: 149 Frank Kovacs (Sheffield Steelers)
