= 1997–98 ISL season =

1997–98 Ice Hockey Superleague season
- League: Ice Hockey Superleague
- Sport: Ice hockey
- Benson & Hedges Cup: Ayr Scottish Eagles
- League champions: Ayr Scottish Eagles
- Playoffs champions: Ayr Scottish Eagles
- Express Cup champions: Ayr Scottish Eagles

Seasons
- ← 1996–97 1998–99 →

The 1997–98 Ice Hockey Superleague season was the second season of the Ice Hockey Superleague (ISL).

There were no changes in the teams taking part during the season – Ayr Scottish Eagles, Basingstoke Bison, Bracknell Bees, Cardiff Devils, Manchester Storm, Newcastle Cobras, Nottingham Panthers and Sheffield Steelers.

The league season was reduced to twenty-eight rounds in the hope of organising a European tournament. However, this failed to materialise so the league arranged a new cup competition to meet the shortfall in fixtures. With the sponsorship of the Daily Express newspaper the Express Cup was launched.

Ayr Scottish Eagles won a Grand Slam of all available trophies.

== Benson & Hedges Cup ==
The Benson & Hedges Cup consisted of the teams from the ISL and the top teams from the British National League. In the 1997–98 season, twelve teams in total were split into two regional groups playing each team in their group once at home and once away. The top four teams of each group then progressed to the quarter-finals where the teams were paired off and the winning team on aggregate (after playing home and away) progressed to the semi-finals. Again the winning team on aggregate progressed to the one-off final game held at Sheffield Arena.

=== Group A ===
Group A	GP	W	T	L	GF	GA	Pts
Manchester Storm	10	7	2	1	65	21	16
Newcastle Cobras	10	6	2	2	59	24	14
Ayr Scottish Eagles	10	6	2	2	56	26	14
Sheffield Steelers	10	5	2	3	65	35	12
Telford Tigers	10	1	0	9	23	84	2
Paisley Pirates	10	1	0	9	21	99	2

=== Group B ===
Group B	GP	W	T	L	GF	GA	Pts
Cardiff Devils	10	8	1	1	58	19	17
Nottingham Panthers	10	8	1	1	54	16	17
Basingstoke Bison	10	5	1	4	40	32	11
Bracknell Bees	10	4	2	4	44	26	10
Slough Jets	10	1	2	7	29	70	4
Peterborough Pirates	10	0	1	9	18	80	1

=== Quarter-finals ===
Quarter-final A: Winner A (Manchester) vs 4th place B (Bracknell)

- Bracknell Bees 2–2 Manchester Storm
- Manchester Storm 5–4 Bracknell Bees (Manchester win 7–6 on aggregate)

Quarter-final B: 3rd place A (Ayr) vs 2nd place B (Nottingham)

- Ayr Scottish Eagles 4–2 Nottingham Panthers
- Nottingham Panthers 3–4 Ayr Scottish Eagles (Ayr win 8–6 on aggregate)

Quarter-final C: 2nd place A (Newcastle) vs 3rd place B (Basingstoke)

- Newcastle Cobras 1–1 Basingstoke Bison
- Basingstoke Bison 1–5 Newcastle Cobras (Newcastle win 6–2 on aggregate)

Quarter-final D: 4th place A (Sheffield) vs Winner B (Cardiff)

- Sheffield Steelers 2–3 Cardiff Devils
- Cardiff Devils 5–2 Sheffield Steelers (Cardiff win 8–4 on aggregate)

=== Semi-finals ===
Winner QF A (Manchester) vs Winner QF B (Ayr)

- Manchester Storm 4–4 Ayr Scottish Eagles
- Ayr Scottish Eagles 4–2 Manchester Storm (Ayr win 8–6 on aggregate)

Winner QF C (Newcastle) vs Winner QF D (Cardiff)

- Cardiff Devils 6–2 Newcastle Cobras
- Newcastle Cobras 3–2 Cardiff Devils (Cardiff win 8–5 on aggregate)

=== Final ===
The final took place at Sheffield Arena between Ayr Scottish Eagles and Cardiff Devils.

- Ayr Scottish Eagles 2–1 Cardiff Devils

== Express Cup ==
All eight teams in the league competed in the new competition for the Express Cup. The first round was a round-robin league with each team playing their opponents once at home and once away. The top four teams progressed to the semi-finals. The semi finals were home and away games with the winner on aggregate progressing to the one off final game.

=== First round ===
Express Cup	GP	W	T	OTL	L	GF	GA	Pts
Ayr Scottish Eagles	14	12	0	1	1	64	34	25
Sheffield Steelers	14	9	0	0	5	61	55	18
Bracknell Bees	14	7	2	1	4	58	55	17
Nottingham Panthers	14	8	0	0	6	60	54	16
Manchester Storm	14	5	3	2	4	54	44	15
Cardiff Devils	14	6	1	0	7	41	49	13
Basingstoke Bison	14	4	0	0	10	43	69	8
Newcastle Cobras	14	1	2	1	10	35	56	5

=== Semi-finals ===
1st place (Ayr) vs 4th place (Nottingham)

- Nottingham Panthers 4–4 Ayr Scottish Eagles
- Ayr Scottish Eagles 12–4 Nottingham Panthers (Ayr win 16–8 on aggregate)

2nd place (Sheffield) vs 3rd place (Bracknell)

- Bracknell Bees 3–1 Sheffield Steelers
- Sheffield Steelers 4–4 Bracknell Bees (Bracknell win 7–4 on aggregate)

=== Final ===
Winner A vs Winner B

- Ayr Scottish Eagles 3–2 Bracknell Bees

== League ==
Each team played two home games and two away games against each of their opponents. All eight teams were entered into the playoffs.

Superleague	GP	W	T	OTL	L	GF	GA	Pts
Ayr Scottish Eagles	28	20	1	2	5	117	69	43
Manchester Storm	28	18	3	1	6	123	80	40
Cardiff Devils	28	15	2	2	9	99	79	34
Nottingham Panthers	28	14	3	0	11	95	99	31
Bracknell Bees	28	14	1	1	12	95	115	30
Sheffield Steelers	28	11	2	3	12	103	101	27
Basingstoke Bison	28	5	4	6	13	80	116	20
Newcastle Cobras	28	6	2	1	19	66	119	15

== Playoffs ==
All eight teams in the league took part in the playoffs. Group A consisted of Ayr, Newcastle, Nottingham and Sheffield while Group B consisted of Basingstoke, Bracknell, Cardiff and Manchester. The top two teams from each playoff group qualified for the semi-finals, which was a home and away series with the winners on games progressing to the final and the losers progressing to the third place playoff.

=== Group A ===
Group A	GP	W	T	OTL	L	GF	GA	Pts
Ayr Scottish Eagles	6	4	1	0	1	19	12	9
Sheffield Steelers	6	2	2	1	1	16	14	7
Nottingham Panthers	6	2	1	2	1	16	19	7
Newcastle Cobras	6	2	0	0	4	15	21	4

=== Group B ===
Group B	GP	W	T	OTL	L	GF	GA	Pts
Cardiff Devils	6	5	1	0	0	31	10	11
Manchester Storm	6	3	1	0	2	21	20	7
Bracknell Bees	6	3	0	0	3	22	30	6
Basingstoke Bison	6	0	0	1	5	17	31	1

=== Semi-finals ===
Winner B vs Runner-Up A

- Cardiff Devils 5-4 Sheffield Steelers
- Sheffield Steelers 2–6 Cardiff Devils (Cardiff win series 2–0)

Winner A vs Runner-Up B

- Ayr Scottish Eagles 5–3 Manchester Storm
- Manchester Storm 2-7 Ayr Scottish Eagles (Ayr win series 2–0)

=== Third place playoff ===
Loser A vs Loser B

- Sheffield Steelers 5–2 Manchester Storm

=== Final ===
Winner A vs Winner B

- Cardiff Devils 2-3 Ayr Scottish Eagles (after overtime)

== Awards ==
- Coach of the Year Trophy – Jim Lynch, Ayr Scottish Eagles
- Player of the Year Trophy – Rob Dopson, Ayr Scottish Eagles
- Alan Weeks Trophy – Stephen Cooper, Manchester Storm

=== All Star teams ===
First team	Position	Second Team
Rob Dopson, Ayr Scottish Eagles	G	Mark Bernard, Bracknell Bees
Scott Young, Ayr Scottish Eagles	D	Kip Noble, Cardiff Devils
Kris Miller, Manchester Storm	D	Shayne McCosh, Bracknell Bees
Ed Courtenay, Sheffield Steelers	F	Tony Hand, Sheffield Steelers
Mark Montanari, Ayr Scottish Eagles	F	Steve Thornton, Cardiff Devils
Craig Woodcroft, Manchester Storm	F	Sam Groleau, Ayr Scottish Eagles

== Scoring leaders ==
The scoring leaders are taken from all league and Express Cup games.

- Most points: 58 Tony Hand (Sheffield Steelers) and Mark Montanari (Ayr Scottish Eagles)
- Most goals: 29 Jamie Steer (Ayr Scottish Eagles)
- Most assists: 44 Tony Hand (Sheffield Steelers)
- Most PIMs: 224 Rob Trumbley (Newcastle Cobras)
