= 1998–99 ISL season =

1998–99 Ice Hockey Superleague season
- League: Ice Hockey Superleague
- Sport: Ice hockey
- Benson & Hedges Cup: Nottingham Panthers
- League champions: Manchester Storm
- Playoffs champions: Cardiff Devils
- Challenge Cup champions: Sheffield Steelers

Seasons
- ← 1997–98 1999–2000 →

The 1998–99 Ice Hockey Superleague season was the third season of the Ice Hockey Superleague (ISL). Having reached a sponsorship deal with Sekonda, the league was now formally known as the Sekonda Ice Hockey Superleague.

Basingstoke Bison left the league and joined the British National League. The London Knights were formed and joined the ISL playing out of London Arena. The Newcastle franchise also changed their name from the Newcastle Cobras to the Newcastle Riverkings.

Losing the Daily Express sponsorship, the Express Cup was renamed the Challenge Cup. The competition was also integrated into the league fixtures with the first round of games between teams (home and away) counting towards the Challenge Cup table and the league table. The league season was therefore increased to forty-two rounds.

== Benson & Hedges Cup ==
The Benson & Hedges Cup consisted of the teams from the ISL and the top teams from the British National League. In the 1998–99 season, sixteen teams in total were split into four groups (two ISL and two BNL) playing each team in their group once at home and once away. All sixteen teams then progressed to a challenge round of a home and away game with the winners on aggregate progressing. The quarter finals and semi finals were also home and away aggregate rounds with the final being a one off game held at Sheffield Arena.

=== Group A ===
Group A	GP	W	T	L	GF	GA	Pts
Bracknell Bees	6	4	0	2	25	20	8
Ayr Scottish Eagles	6	3	2	1	29	25	8
Cardiff Devils	6	2	1	3	21	25	5
Newcastle Riverkings	6	1	1	4	24	29	3

=== Group B ===
Group B	GP	W	T	L	GF	GA	Pts
Manchester Storm	6	4	2	0	19	12	10
Sheffield Steelers	6	3	1	2	20	18	7
Nottingham Panthers	6	2	2	2	19	16	6
London Knights	6	0	1	5	12	24	1

=== Group C ===
Group C	GP	W	T	L	GF	GA	Pts
Telford Tigers	6	4	0	2	26	20	8
Fife Flyers	6	3	1	2	25	20	7
Edinburgh Capitals	6	2	1	3	19	26	5
Paisley Pirates	6	1	2	3	19	23	4

=== Group D ===
Group D	GP	W	T	L	GF	GA	Pts
Guildford Flames	6	4	1	1	30	23	9
Slough Jets	6	4	1	1	25	19	9
Peterborough Pirates	6	1	1	4	25	32	3
Kingston Hawks	6	0	3	3	23	29	3

=== Finals ===
Note: The first home team is shown first

Challenge round
B2	Sheffield Steelers	15	8	23
D3	Peterborough Pirates	2	1	3
B1	Manchester Storm	7	9	16
D4	Kingston Hawks	1	2	3
B3	Nottingham Panthers	14	5	19
D2	Slough Jets	0	0	0
A4	Newcastle Riverkings	3	6	9
C1	Telford Tigers	2	2	4
A2	Ayr Scottish Eagles	14	9	23
C3	Edinburgh Capitals	0	2	2
A1	Bracknell Bees	11	13	24
C4	Paisley Pirates	1	1	2
A3	Cardiff Devils	13	9	22
C2	Fife Flyers	0	0	0
D1	Guildford Flames	1	3	4
B4	London Knights	10	6	16

Quarter-finals
B1	Manchester Storm	2	4	6
B2	Sheffield Steelers	2	2	4
B3	Nottingham Panthers	3	4	7
A4	Newcastle Riverkings	0	1	1
A1	Bracknell Bees	1	4	5
A2	Ayr Scottish Eagles	7	4	11
B4	London Knights	3	5	8
A3	Cardiff Devils	0	4	4

Semi-finals
B1	Manchester Storm	3	1	4
B3	Nottingham Panthers	2	3	5
A2	Ayr Scottish Eagles	6	6	12
B4	London Knights	4	0	4

Final
B3	Nottingham Panthers	2
A2	Ayr Scottish Eagles	1

== Challenge Cup ==
All eight teams in the league competed in the newly renamed Challenge Cup. The first round was the first home and away meeting of each team in the league with the points counting towards both the Challenge Cup table and the league table. The top four teams progressed to the semi-finals. The semi finals were home and away games with the winner on aggregate progressing to the one off final game.

=== First round ===
Challenge Cup	GP	W	T	OTL	L	GF	GA	Pts
Manchester Storm	14	10	1	2	1	47	28	23
Nottingham Panthers	14	9	0	2	3	50	36	20
Cardiff Devils	14	8	0	2	4	41	33	18
Sheffield Steelers	14	6	2	2	4	55	46	16
Ayr Scottish Eagles	14	6	2	1	5	40	43	15
Bracknell Bees	14	6	0	1	7	39	52	13
Newcastle Riverkings	14	5	1	1	7	36	43	12
London Knights	14	2	2	1	9	39	66	7

=== Semi-finals ===
1st place (Manchester) vs 4th place (Sheffield)

- Sheffield Steelers 5–0 Manchester Storm
- Manchester Storm 1–3 Sheffield Steelers (Sheffield win 8–1 on aggregate)

2nd place (Nottingham) vs 3rd place (Cardiff)

- Cardiff Devils 2–3 Nottingham Panthers
- Nottingham Panthers 3–3 Cardiff Devils (after overtime, Nottingham win 6–5 on aggregate)

=== Final ===
Winner A vs Winner B

- Sheffield Steelers 4–0 Nottingham Panthers

== League ==
Each team played three home games and three away games against each of their opponents. All eight teams were entered into the playoffs.

Superleague	GP	W	T	OTL	L	GF	GA	Pts
Manchester Storm	42	30	1	4	7	155	86	65
Cardiff Devils	42	27	0	5	10	144	102	59
Nottingham Panthers	42	25	1	2	14	140	134	53
Bracknell Bees	42	19	2	4	17	144	149	44
Ayr Scottish Eagles	42	18	3	3	18	136	140	42
Sheffield Steelers	42	17	4	2	19	135	141	40
Newcastle Riverkings	42	14	2	2	24	117	150	32
London Knights	42	10	3	4	25	114	183	27

== Playoffs ==
All eight teams in the league took part in the playoffs. Group A consisted of Bracknell, London, Manchester and Sheffield while Group B consisted of Ayr, Cardiff, Newcastle and Nottingham. The top two teams from each playoff group qualified for the finals weekend. The third place playoff was dropped for this season.

=== Group A ===
Group A	GP	W	T	OTL	L	GF	GA	Pts
Manchester Storm	6	5	0	0	1	22	9	10
Bracknell Bees	6	5	0	0	1	25	19	10
Sheffield Steelers	6	2	0	0	4	20	23	4
London Knights	6	0	0	1	5	14	30	1

=== Group B ===
Group B	GP	W	T	OTL	L	GF	GA	Pts
Nottingham Panthers	6	5	0	0	1	20	16	10
Cardiff Devils	6	3	1	0	2	20	16	7
Ayr Scottish Eagles	6	2	1	0	3	21	20	5
Newcastle Riverkings	6	1	0	2	3	14	23	4

=== Semi-finals ===
Winner A vs Runner-Up B

- Manchester Storm 0-5 Cardiff Devils

Winner B vs Runner-Up A

- Nottingham Panthers 4–3 Bracknell Bees

=== Final ===
Winner A vs Winner B

- Cardiff Devils 2-1 Nottingham Panthers

== Awards ==
- Coach of the Year Trophy – Kurt Kleinendorst, Manchester Storm
- Player of the Year Trophy – Frank Pietrangelo, Manchester Storm
- Ice Hockey Annual Trophy – Tony Hand, Sheffield Steelers
- British Netminder of the Year – Stevie Lyle, Cardiff Devils
- Alan Weeks Trophy – Stephen Cooper, Newcastle Riverkings

=== All Star teams ===
First team	Position	Second Team
Frank Pietrangelo, Manchester Storm	G	Trevor Robins, Nottingham Panthers
Kip Noble, Cardiff Devils	D	Kris Miller, Manchester Storm
Troy Neumeier, Manchester Storm	D	Rob Stewart, Bracknell Bees
Greg Hadden, Nottingham Panthers	F	Ivan Matulik, Cardiff Devils
Ed Courtenay, Sheffield Steelers	F	Jeff Tomlinson, Manchester Storm
Paul Adey, Nottingham Panthers	F	Jeff Jablonski, Manchester Storm

== Scoring leaders ==
The scoring leaders are taken from all league games.

- Most points: 56 Paul Adey (Nottingham Panthers)
- Most goals: 29 Greg Hadden (Nottingham Panthers)
- Most assists: 35 Paul Adey (Nottingham Panthers)
- Most PIMs: 152 Paxton Schulte (Bracknell Bees)
