= Tero Arkiomaa =

Finnish ice hockey player

- Born: February 20, 1968 (age 58) Helsinki, Finland
- Height: 6 ft 2 in (188 cm)
- Weight: 198 lb (90 kg; 14 st 2 lb)
- Position: Right wing
- Shot: Left
- Played for: SM-liiga; KalPa; JoKP; SaiPa; Lukko; Ässät; BISL; Newcastle Jesters; Bracknell Bees; DEL; Augsburger Panther; AUS; Innsbruck EV
- National team: Finland
- Playing career: 1985–2005

Tero Arkiomaa (born February 20, 1968) is a Finnish retired ice hockey player.

== Playing career ==
Tero Arkiomaa started his career near his birthplace in Helsinki, Finland, and played his first games in TJV Vantaa a lower league team in Vantaa region. Soon after his first full season in TJV Arkiomaa moved to Kuopio and played two seasons for KalPa which played in SM-liiga. After KalPa Arkiomaa played in JoKP a Joensuu based team which gained promotion from 1. Divisioona to SM-liiga during Arkiomaa's tenure.

After good seasons with KalPa, JoKP and a brief stint in SaiPa Tero Arkiomaa was contracted to Rauman Lukko, an SM-Liiga team from Rauma. In Lukko, Arkiomaa had some of his best seasons scoring points in bunches and getting National Team plays for Finland. In each of his Lukko-seasons Arkiomaa played in the SM-Liiga Playoffs culminating in 1994 when Lukko won the bronze medal game in overtime against Tappara. Arkiomaa and Lukko appeared again in the bronze medal game in 1995 but lost to rival team Porin Ässät 3–0.

After some good seasons and success in Lukko, Arkiomaa moved abroad and played for two seasons in Germany. The team was Augsburger Panther. After two seasons in Deutsche Eishockey Liga Arkiomaa returned to Finland and played two seasons in his former rivals Ässät. After Ässät Arkiomaa moved to England and played for Newcastle Jesters, a team partially owned by Helsingin Jokerit chairman and businessman Harry Harkimo. After Newcastle Arkiomaa played in Austria for Innsbruck EV and again in England for Bracknell Bees.

== After retirement ==
After playing in Germany, Austria and England Tero Arkiomaa returned to Finland and moved to a small Southern Finland town of Riihimäki. In Riihimäki Arkiomaa started to coach a minor junior hockey team and played in a local second division team Peltosaaren Nikkarit for two separate occasions before completely retiring from playing. After his retirement, Arkiomaa has played in Exhibition/Charity Ice Hockey games.

== International career ==
Tero Arkiomaa
Medal record

Representing Finland

Men's ice hockey

World Junior Championships
Bronze medal – third place	1988 Soviet Union	Ice hockey

Arkiomaa's International highlight came when he won Bronze in the 1988 World Junior Ice Hockey Championships. Along with Arkiomaa, the team featured Janne Ojanen and Teppo Numminen who both would go on and have a long career on top level ice hockey leagues.

Arkiomaa played in 26 International matches for Finland scoring 5 goals and assisting 4.

== Career statistics ==
			Regular season					Playoffs
Season	Team	League	GP	G	A	Pts	PIM	GP	G	A	Pts	PIM
1985–86	Tikkurilan Jääveikot	Fin-2	43	8	4	12	27	—	—	—	—	—
1986–87	KalPa	SM-l	14	0	0	0	6	—	—	—	—	—
1987–88	KalPa	SM-l	44	2	5	7	12	—	—	—	—	—
1988–89	JoKP	Fin-2	44	36	35	71	32	5	4	4	8	18
1989–90	JoKP	SM-l	44	18	14	32	30	—	—	—	—	—
1990–91	SaiPa	SM-l	44	18	22	40	28	—	—	—	—	—
1991–92	Lukko	SM-l	44	15	8	23	38	2	0	0	0	0
1992–93	Lukko	SM-l	48	12	17	29	40	3	1	0	1	2
1993–94	Lukko	SM-l	47	19	23	42	52	9	1	4	5	10
1994–95	Lukko	SM-l	45	22	23	45	54	9	2	3	5	12
1995–96	Lukko	SM-l	35	12	17	29	34	8	0	1	1	2
1996–97	Augsburger Panther	DEL	48	24	17	41	56	—	—	—	—	—
1997–98	Augsburger Panther	DEL	49	11	13	24	43	—	—	—	—	—
1998–99	Ässät	SM-l	39	9	6	15	34	—	—	—	—	—
1999–00	Ässät	SM-l	53	9	10	19	38	—	—	—	—	—
2000–01	Newcastle Jesters	BISL	47	15	25	40	16	—	—	—	—	—
2001–02	Innsbruck EV	Aus	32	15	25	40	20	4	0	0	0	4
2002–03	Bracknell Bees	BISL	32	7	9	16	22	15	2	1	3	6
2003–04	Peltosaaren Nikkarit	Fin-4	11	10	16	26	10	—	—	—	—	—
2004–05	Peltosaaren Nikkarit	Fin-4	4	3	2	5	0	—	—	—	—	—
SM-Liiga totals			457	136	145	281	366	31	4	8	12	18
