= Newcastle Jesters =

Ice hockey team from Tyne and Wear, England

- Founded: 1996
- League: Ice Hockey Superleague
- Team history: Newcastle Cobras 1996–98; Newcastle Riverkings 1998–2000; Newcastle Jesters 2000–01
- Based in: Newcastle upon Tyne, England
- Arena: Telewest Arena
- Colours: Red, Blue, Yellow & White
- Owner: Harry Harkimo (former), now Defunct

The Newcastle Jesters were an ice hockey franchise based in Newcastle Upon Tyne, England. The team were members of the Ice Hockey Superleague and played their home games at the Telewest Arena (now the Utilita Arena).

== History ==
=== Single Season of Jesters (2000–2001) ===
The name 'Jesters' was the last of three used by the club during its five-year existence. The franchise was initially known as the Newcastle Cobras between 1996 and 1998. The team was then known as the Newcastle Riverkings for two seasons between 1998 and 2000 before it assumed its final name for the 2000–01 season.

The team featured lots of Finnish players during the teams season as the Jesters. The team had former Jokerit players Tommi Sova and Santeri Immonen, former JYP and Ilves goaltender Tommi Satosaari and Tero Arkiomaa, who was the second best pointscorer during the season. The team was coached by future multiple time world championship winning coach Jukka Jalonen.

At the end of 2000 the Jesters had lost four games in a row, and hired Canadian NHL veteran Bob Halkidis as a defender to boost their flagging fortunes. Mid-February 2001 saw the team at the bottom of the table, one point adrift of Nottingham after five successive defeats including an 8-nil defeat at the hands of Cardiff. By March 2001 it was revealed that the Jesters owed two months unpaid wages to their playing squad, who took legal action against the club. By April 2001 the general manager of the club was in talks to move to Sheffield. The Jesters were subsequently banned by the league from hiring new players due to the non-payment of salaries, but shortly before the start of the 2001-2 season Paul Smith, the chairman of the team, was still insisting that they would be playing that season. The club was then shut down.

Hockey returned to the area with the Newcastle Vipers who joined the British National League in 2002 and then became members of the Elite Ice Hockey League. The Vipers though folded in 2011.

Newcastle Riverkings logo

=== 2000–01 Ice Hockey Superleague Roster ===
Pos.	Name	Nationality	Birthdate	Birthplace
GK	Jimmy Hibbert	(Canada) Canadian	8 February 1975	Toronto, Ontario, Canada
GK	Bill Russell	(Canada) Canadian	25 February 1977	St. Albert, Alberta, Canada
GK	Tommi Satosaari	(Finland) Finnish	17 February 1975	Jyväskylä, FIN
D	Craig Binns	(Canada) Canadian	18 July 1974	Ottawa, Ontario, Canada
D	Bob Halkidis	(Canada) Canadian	5 March 1966	Toronto, Ontario, Canada
D	Santeri Immonen	(Finland) Finnish	29 July 1972	Helsinki, FIN
D	Arttu Käyhkö	(Finland) Finnish	5 January 1973	Joensuu, FIN
D	Darren McAusland	(Canada) Canadian	3 March 1972	Grovedale, Alberta, Canada
D	Miroslav Mosnar	(Slovakia) Slovakian	10 August 1968	Bratislava, SVK, Czechoslovakia
D	Rob Wilson	(United Kingdom) British/ (Canada) Canadian	18 July 1968	Toronto, Ontario, Canada
RW	Tero Arkiomaa	(Finland) Finnish	20 February 1968	Helsinki, FIN
RW	Louis Bedard	(Canada) Canadian	14 October 1975	Montreal, Quebec, Canada
C/RW	MichaelBowman	(United Kingdom) British	25 October 1980	Durham, England, UK
F	David Clarke	(United Kingdom) British	5 August 1981	Peterborough, England, UK
F	Eric Fenton	(United States) American	17 July 1969	Troy, New York, USA
F	Tomas Kupka	(Czech Republic) Czech	30 September 1968	Prague, CZE
C	Daniel Lacroix	(Canada) Canadian	11 March 1969	Montreal, Quebec, Canada
C	Gelnn Mulvenna	(United Kingdom) British/ (Canada) Canadian	18 February 1967	Calgary, Alberta, Canada
C/LW	Matt Oates	(United States) American	20 December 1972	Evanston, Illinois, USA
F	Joel Poirier	(Canada) Canadian	1 May 1975	Richmond Hill, Ontario, Canada
F	Stuart Potts	(United Kingdom) British	9 October 1981	Durham, England, UK
LW	Erkki Rajamäki	(Finland) Finnish	30 October 1978	Vantaa, FIN
C	Lubomir Rybovic	(Slovakia) Slovakian	12 February 1972	Košice, SVK, Czechoslovakia
RW	Timo Salonen	(Finland) Finnish	28 August 1976	Pori, FIN
C	Tommi Sova	(Finland) Finnish	8 April 1975	Oulu, FIN
RW	Jari Suorsa	(Finland) Finnish	27 January 1976	Kuusankoski, FIN
F	Andrew Tindale	(United Kingdom) British	22 October 1980	Sunderland, England, UK
