= 1990 Memorial Cup =

Canadian junior men's ice hockey championship

Tournament details
- Venue(s): Copps Coliseum; Hamilton, Ontario
- Dates: May 5–13, 1990
- Teams: 4
- Host team: Dukes of Hamilton (OHL; did not participate)
- TV partner: TSN

Final positions
- Champions: Oshawa Generals (OHL) (4th title)

Tournament statistics
- Games played: 8

The Memorial Cup trophy

The 1990 Memorial Cup occurred May 5–13 at the Copps Coliseum in Hamilton, Ontario. It was the 72nd annual Memorial Cup competition and determined the major junior ice hockey champion of the Canadian Hockey League (CHL). Participating teams were the Ontario Hockey League champion Oshawa Generals and runner-up Kitchener Rangers, as well as the winners of the Quebec Major Junior Hockey League and Western Hockey League which were the Laval Titan and Kamloops Blazers. The original host team, the short-lived Dukes of Hamilton, were forced to drop out after only winning eleven games in the 1989–90 OHL season. Oshawa won their 4th Memorial Cup, defeating Kitchener in the final game.

== Teams ==
QMJHL Team OHL Team WHL Team Host City

=== Kamloops Blazers ===
The Kamloops Blazers finished the 1989–90 season with the best record in the Western Hockey League, finishing the season with a 56-16-0 record, earning 112 points, clinching the Scotty Munro Memorial Trophy. The Blazers led the league with 484 goals, and finished the season with the second fewest goals allowed at 278. In the West Division semi-finals, Kamloops defeated the Spokane Chiefs fives games to one, followed by beating the Seattle Thunderbirds five games to one in the West Division finals, setting up a matchup against the Lethbridge Hurricanes for the President's Cup. The Blazers defeated the Hurricanes four games to one to secure a berth in the 1990 Memorial Cup.

The Blazers were led by Len Barrie, who scored a league high 85 goals and 185 points in 70 games to win the Bob Clarke Trophy. Barrie followed up his spectacular regular season with 14 goals and 37 points in the post-season to lead the Blazers to the WHL championship. Phil Huber finished fourth in league scoring as he scored 63 goals and 152 points in 72 games, while Mike Needham scored 59 goals and 125 points in 60 games. Seventeen year old defenseman Darryl Sydor led the defense with 29 goals and 95 points in 67 games as he was one of the top prospects heading into the 1990 NHL entry draft. Sixteen year old rookie Scott Niedermayer scored 14 goals and 69 points in 64 games in his first season of junior hockey. Corey Hirsch was the Blazers starting goaltender, as in 63 games, he earned a record of 48-13-0 with a 3.82 GAA and a save percentage of .876. Head coach Ken Hitchcock was awarded the Dunc McCallum Memorial Trophy as WHL Coach of the Year.

The 1989–90 season was the third time in team history that the Blazers had won the President's Cup. The team had previously won the championship in 1984 and 1986. The Blazers did not win the Memorial Cup in their previous appearances, as in the 1984 Memorial Cup, the franchise, known at the time as the Kamloops Jr. Oilers, finished in third place, while in the 1986 Memorial Cup, the Blazers once again finished in third.

=== Kitchener Rangers ===
The Kitchener Rangers had a record of 38-21-7 in the 1989–90 season, earning 83 points and second place in the Emms Division. The high powered Rangers offence led the OHL with 358 goals, while the club allowed 259 goals, the sixth fewest in the league. In the post-season, the Rangers defeated the North Bay Centennials four games to one in the Emms Division quarter-finals. Kitchener earned a bye in the Emms Division semi-finals, advancing straight to the Emms Division finals, where they defeated the Niagara Falls Thunder four games to one. By advancing to the J. Ross Robertson Cup finals, the Rangers were guaranteed a berth in the1990 Memorial Cup as the Dukes of Hamilton, the host of the tournament, were forced to dropout of the tournament following a very poor on-ice product. The Rangers faced the Oshawa Generals for the OHL championship, however, the team lost in seven games.

Gilbert Dionne led the Rangers offence with 48 goals and 105 points in 64 games, finishing seventh in league scoring. Joey St. Aubin finished just behind Dionne in points, as he scored 36 goals and 104 points in 66 games. Jason Firth also managed to break the 100 point plateau, as he scored 36 goals and 100 points in 63 games. Shayne Stevenson, who scored 28 goals and 90 points in 56 games during the regular season, led Kitchener in post-season scoring, as he had 16 goals and 37 points in 17 games. Kitchener native Steven Rice had the second highest goal total on the club with 39, while earning 76 points in 58 games. Cory Keenan led the defense with 13 goals and 48 points in 66 games, while Jason York, acquired mid-season in a trade with the Windsor Spitfires, scored 11 goals and 36 points in only 25 games with Kitchener. Mike Torchia got the majority of playing time in goal, earning a 25-11-2 record with a 3.58 GAA and a .875 save percentage in 40 games.

The 1990 Memorial Cup was the fourth time in team history that the Rangers earned a berth. Their previous appearance was in the 1984 Memorial Cup, as Kitchener lost to the Ottawa 67's in the final game. The Rangers also lost in the final game in the 1981 Memorial Cup to the Cornwall Royals and won the Memorial Cup in the 1982 Memorial Cup against the Sherbrooke Castors.

=== Laval Titan ===
The Laval Titan had a mediocre regular season during the 1989–90 season, as the team finished with a 37-30-3 record, earning 77 points and fifth place in the eleven team league. The Titan were the second highest scoring team in the QMJHL, scoring 332 goals, while their 274 goals against was the third fewest in the league. In the QMJHL quarter-finals, the Titan defeated Shawinigan Cataractes four games to two, advancing to the QMJHL semi-finals. In this round of the post-season, Laval defeated the Hull Olympiques four games to one, setting up a matchup against the first place Victoriaville Tigres for the President's Cup. The Titan stunned the heavily favoured Tigres with a four-game sweep to win the championship for the second consecutive season and earn a berth in the 1990 Memorial Cup.

Denis Chalifoux led the Titan offensively, scoring a team high 109 points during the regular season, including 41 goals in 70 games. In the post-season, Chalifoux won the Guy Lafleur Trophy for the Playoff MVP after he scored 14 goals and 28 points in 14 games. Sixteen year old rookie Martin Lapointe won the Michel Bergeron Trophy, awarded to the Offensive Rookie of the Year, after scoring 42 goals and 96 points in 65 games. Sylvain Naud led the Titan in goals, scoring 55, while earning 95 points in 69 games. On defense, Patrice Brisebois scored 18 goals and 88 points in 56 games to lead the blue line, while Michel Gingras scored 26 goals and 70 points in 64 games. Rookie goaltender Eric Raymond emerged as the starting goaltender of the Titan, earning a record of 18-13-3 with a 3.57 GAA and a .882 save percentage in 37 games. Raymond followed up with a 10–0 record and a 2.27 GAA and a .917 save percentage in the post-season.

The 1990 Memorial Cup was the third time Laval clinched a berth in the tournament. The Laval Voisins finished in fourth place at the 1984 Memorial Cup, while the Titan again finished in fourth at the 1989 Memorial Cup.

=== Oshawa Generals ===
The Oshawa Generals had the best record in the Ontario Hockey League during the 1989–90 season, earning a record of 42-20-4 for 88 points and winning the Hamilton Spectator Trophy. The Generals scored 334 goals, the second highest in the league, while they allowed 244 goals, the third fewest in the OHL. In the playoffs, Oshawa defeated the Cornwall Royals four games to two in the Leyden Division quarter-finals, earning a bye in the division semi-finals. In the Leyden Division finals, the Generals swept the Peterborough Petes in four games, earning a berth in the 1990 Memorial Cup after the host team, the Dukes of Hamilton, were forced to give up their spot following a very poor regular season record. The Generals faced the Kitchener Rangers for the J. Ross Robertson Cup, and defeated the Rangers four games to three to win the OHL championship.

Oshawa was led offensively by Iain Fraser, who scored a team high 105 points in 56 games. Fraser was awarded the Leo Lalonde Memorial Trophy as the best overage player in the OHL. Oshawa native Brent Grieve led the Generals with 46 goals, while his 93 points were the second highest total on the team. Jarrod Skalde scored 40 goals and 92 points in 62 games, while Mike Craig scored 36 goals and 76 points in only 43 games. Rookie Eric Lindros, acquired by the Generals after a trade with the Sault Ste. Marie Greyhounds, scored 17 goals and 36 points in 25 games during the regular season. In the post-season, Lindros led the Generals in scoring with 18 goals and 36 points in 17 games. Goaltender Kevin Butt saw the majority of playing time, earning a record of 25-15-2 with a 3.73 GAA and a .873 save percentage in 49 games. Rookie backup goaltender Fred Brathwaite had a very solid season, as his record was 11-2-1 with a 3.00 GAA and a .897 save percentage in 20 games.

The 1990 Memorial Cup was the Generals tenth appearance. The Generals won the Memorial Cup in 1939, 1940 and 1944. The club made two appearances at the tournament during the 1980s, losing the final game at the 1983 Memorial Cup to the Portland Winter Hawks and again losing the final game at the 1987 Memorial Cup to the Medicine Hat Tigers.

== Round-robin standings ==
| Pos | Team | Pld | W | L | GF | GA | |
|---|---|---|---|---|---|---|---|
| 1 | Oshawa Generals (OHL) | 3 | 3 | 0 | 18 | 12 | Advanced directly to the championship game |
| 2 | Kitchener Rangers (OHL runner-up) | 3 | 2 | 1 | 17 | 15 | Advanced to the semifinal game |
| 3 | Laval Titan (QMJHL) | 3 | 1 | 2 | 9 | 13 | Advanced to the semifinal game |
| 4 | Kamloops Blazers (WHL) | 3 | 0 | 3 | 15 | 19 | |

== Scores ==
Round-robin

- May 5 – Kitchener 8–7 Kamloops (OT)
- May 5 – Oshawa 6–2 Laval
- May 6 – Oshawa 7–6 Kamloops (OT)
- May 8 – Kitchener 5–3 Laval
- May 9 – Laval 4–2 Kamloops
- May 10 – Oshawa 5–4 Kitchener (2OT)

Semi-final

- May 12 – Kitchener 5–4 Laval

Final

- May 13 – Oshawa 4–3 Kitchener (2OT)

=== Winning roster ===
1989-90 Oshawa Generals
| Goaltenders: – Fred Brathwaite; – Kevin Butt | Defencemen: – Bill Armstrong; – David Craievich; – Jean-Paul Davis; – Craig Donaldson; – Brian Grieve; – Paul O'Hagan; – Wade Simpson | Wingers: – Cory Banika; – Joe Busillo; – Clair Cornish; – Mike Craig; – Mark Deazeley; – Brent Grieve; – Matt Hoffman; – Scott Hollis; – Scott Luik; – Trevor McIvor | Centres: – Dale Craigwell; – Iain Fraser; – Eric Lindros; – Jarrod Skalde; Coach: Rick Cornacchia; General Manager: Frank Jay |

== Award winners ==
- Stafford Smythe Memorial Trophy (MVP): Iain Fraser, Oshawa
- George Parsons Trophy (Sportsmanship): Jason Firth, Kitchener
- Hap Emms Memorial Trophy (Goaltender): Mike Torchia, Kitchener

All-star team

- Goal: Mike Torchia, Kitchener
- Defence: Cory Keenan, Kitchener; Paul O'Hagan, Oshawa
- Centre: Eric Lindros, Oshawa
- Left wing: Iain Fraser, Oshawa
- Right wing: Steven Rice, Kitchener
