= Jason Firth =

Canadian ice hockey player (born 1971)

- Born: March 29, 1971 (age 55) Dartmouth, Nova Scotia, Canada
- Height: 5 ft 11 in (180 cm)
- Weight: 186 lb (84 kg; 13 st 4 lb)
- Position: Centre
- Shot: Left
- UHL team Former teams: Port Huron Beacons; Adirondack Red Wings (AHL); Thunder Bay Thunder Hawks (CoHL); Prince Edward Island Senators (AHL); Syracuse Crunch (AHL); Thunder Bay Senators (CoHL); Thunder Bay Thunder Cats (CoHL); Rockford IceHogs (UHL); Tupelo T-Rex (WPHL); Bakersfield Condors (WCHL); Port Huron Beacons (UHL)
- NHL draft: 208th overall, 1991; Detroit Red Wings
- Playing career: 1992–2005

Jason Firth (born March 29, 1971) is a Canadian retired professional ice hockey player. He is the leader in career assists and points for the United Hockey League.

== Junior career ==
Firth played Tier II junior hockey for the Ottawa Jr. Senators of the Central Junior Hockey League; in his single season for the team in 1988, he scored 126 points to lead the team.

Drafted by the Kitchener Rangers of the Ontario Hockey League, he finished third in team scoring with 67 points in 1989, helping the Rangers to a first-place finish after several mediocre seasons. In 1990, he was again third in team scoring with 100 points. The Rangers lost in the league finals to the Oshawa Generals, and normally would not have gone on to play in the Memorial Cup tournament, but Cup host and OHL team Hamilton Dukes had the league's worst record and was replaced in the Memorial Cup by the Rangers. Firth scored 22 points in 17 playoff games as the Rangers surged to the Cup finals, eventually losing in double overtime in the final match to the Generals, 4–3. His performance led to him being awarded the George Parsons Trophy for sportsmanship in the Memorial Cup.

Firth's third season in Kitchener saw him lead the team with 112 points, and finish sixth in league scoring, after which he was selected in the tenth round of the 1991 NHL entry draft by the Detroit Red Wings. He played his final junior season as an overager for the North Bay Centennials. Despite injuries that cost him 13 games, Firth finished second in team scoring with 97 points, and added 25 points in the playoffs as the Centennials reached the OHL Finals.

== Professional career ==
Firth made his professional debut for the Red Wings' American Hockey League farm team, the Adirondack Red Wings, in the spring of 1992, playing two games without scoring. His junior success notwithstanding, the Red Wings declined to sign Firth to a contract for the 1993 season, and he signed as a free agent with the Ottawa Senators. He never played in Ottawa, instead playing in the mid- to low-minor leagues for over a decade thereafter.

Firth retired after the 2005 season. He finished his professional career with 449 goals and 921 assists for 1370 points; as of 2015, he is the tenth leading scorer in minor league hockey history. In the United Hockey League, Firth scored 357 goals and 732 assists for 1089 points, the highest career totals ever recorded in the UHL for both assists and points.
