= Brent Grieve =

Canadian ice hockey player and coach

- Born: May 9, 1969 (age 56) Oshawa, Ontario, Canada
- Height: 6 ft 1 in (185 cm)
- Weight: 204 lb (93 kg; 14 st 8 lb)
- Position: Left wing
- Shot: Left
- Played for: New York Islanders; Edmonton Oilers; Chicago Blackhawks; Los Angeles Kings
- NHL draft: 65th overall, 1989; New York Islanders
- Playing career: 1990–1997

Brent J. Grieve (born May 9, 1969) is a Canadian former professional ice hockey left wing and coach. He played 97 games in the National Hockey League with four teams between 1993 and 1996.

== Playing career ==
As a youth, Grieve played in the 1982 Quebec International Pee-Wee Hockey Tournament with a minor ice hockey team from Oshawa.

He was selected in the fourth round of the 1989 NHL entry draft, 65th overall, by the New York Islanders and played 97 NHL games with the Islanders, Edmonton Oilers, Chicago Blackhawks and Los Angeles Kings, as well as multiple seasons with various minor league teams.

== Post-playing career ==
Following his retirement, Grieve served as an assistant coach with his hometown Oshawa Generals for the 1997–98 season.

== Career statistics ==
=== Regular season and playoffs ===
			Regular season					Playoffs
Season	Team	League	GP	G	A	Pts	PIM	GP	G	A	Pts	PIM
1985–86	Oshawa Legionaires	MetJBHL	51	38	48	86	200	—	—	—	—	—
1986–87	Oshawa Generals	OHL	60	9	19	28	102	24	3	8	11	22
1986–87	Oshawa Generals	M-Cup	—	—	—	—	—	4	0	2	2	16
1987–88	Oshawa Generals	OHL	55	19	20	39	122	7	0	1	1	8
1988–89	Oshawa Generals	OHL	49	34	33	67	105	6	4	3	7	4
1989–90	Oshawa Generals	OHL	62	46	47	93	125	17	10	10	20	26
1989–90	Oshawa Generals	M-Cup	—	—	—	—	—	4	3	3	6	0
1990–91	Capital District Islanders	AHL	61	14	13	27	80	—	—	—	—	—
1990–91	Kansas City Blades	IHL	5	2	2	4	2	—	—	—	—	—
1991–92	Capital District Islanders	AHL	74	34	32	66	84	7	3	1	4	16
1992–93	Capital District Islanders	AHL	79	34	28	62	122	4	1	1	2	10
1993–94	New York Islanders	NHL	3	0	0	0	7	—	—	—	—	—
1993–94	Salt Lake Golden Eagles	IHL	22	9	5	14	30	—	—	—	—	—
1993–94	Edmonton Oilers	NHL	24	13	5	18	14	—	—	—	—	—
1993–94	Cape Breton Oilers	AHL	20	10	11	21	14	4	2	4	6	16
1994–95	Chicago Blackhawks	NHL	24	1	4	5	23	—	—	—	—	—
1995–96	Chicago Blackhawks	NHL	28	2	4	6	28	—	—	—	—	—
1995–96	Indianapolis Ice	IHL	24	9	10	19	16	—	—	—	—	—
1995–96	Phoenix Roadrunners	IHL	13	8	11	19	14	4	2	1	3	18
1996–97	Los Angeles Kings	NHL	18	4	2	6	15	—	—	—	—	—
1996–97	Phoenix Roadrunners	IHL	31	10	14	24	51	—	—	—	—	—
2004–05	Whitby Dunlops	EOSHL	5	5	0	5	18	—	—	—	—	—
2005–06	Whitby Dunlops	EOSHL	15	17	20	37	50	7	6	3	9	62
2005–06	Whitby Dunlops	Al-Cup	—	—	—	—	—	3	3	2	5	12
AHL totals			234	92	84	176	300	15	6	6	12	42
NHL totals			97	20	16	36	87	—	—	—	—	—
