= Connor McDavid =

Canadian ice hockey player (born 1997)

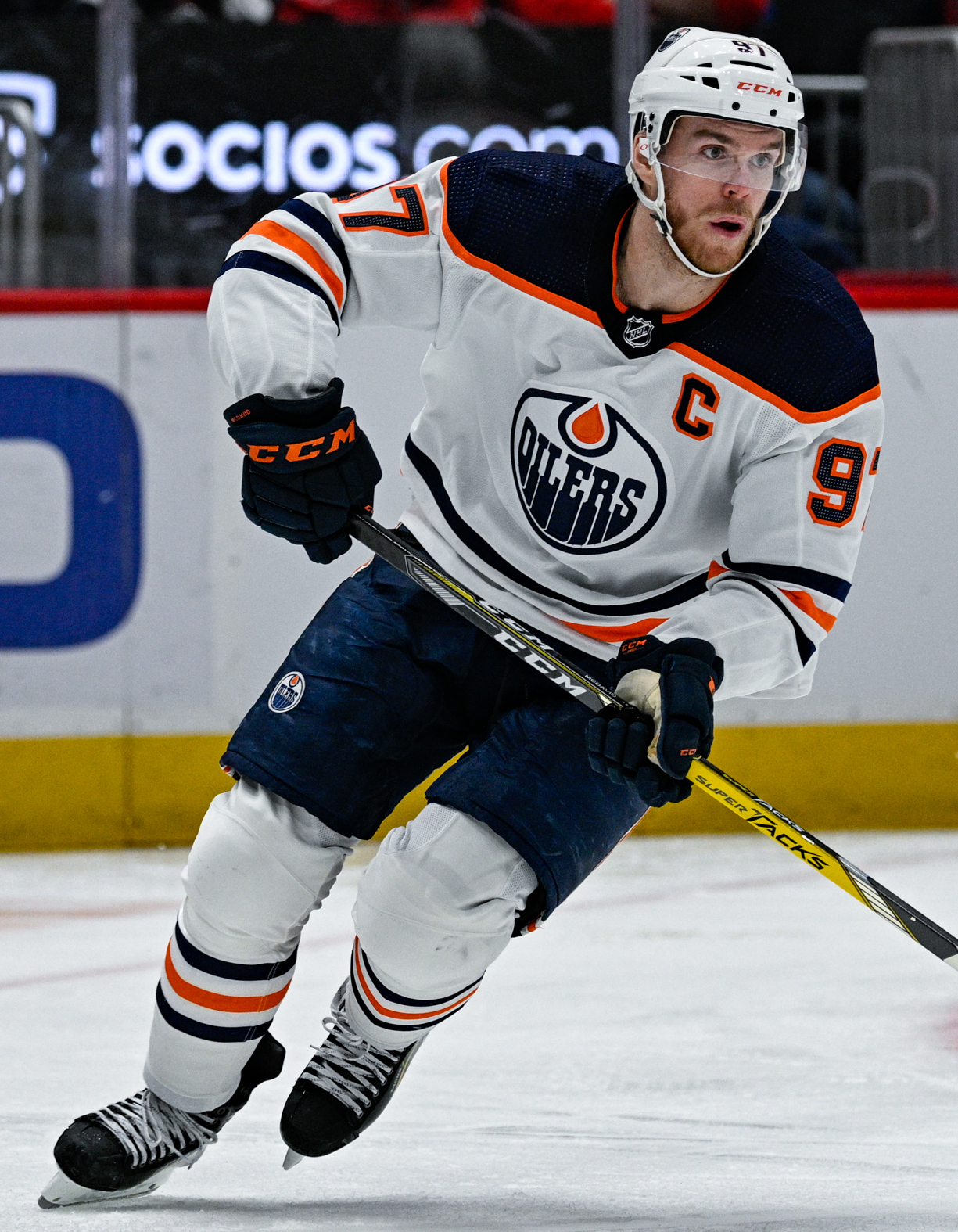
- McDavid with the Edmonton Oilers in 2022
- Born: January 13, 1997 (age 29) Richmond Hill, Ontario, Canada
- Height: 6 ft 2 in (188 cm)
- Weight: 190 lb (86 kg; 13 st 8 lb)
- Position: Centre
- Shoots: Left
- NHL team: Edmonton Oilers
- National team: Canada
- NHL draft: 1st overall, 2015; Edmonton Oilers
- Playing career: 2015–present

Connor Andrew McDavid (born January 13, 1997) is a Canadian professional ice hockey player who is a centre and captain for the Edmonton Oilers of the National Hockey League (NHL). Selected first overall by the Oilers in the 2015 NHL entry draft, McDavid is widely considered one of the best players of all time.

McDavid spent his childhood playing ice hockey against older children. Coached by his father, McDavid won four Ontario Minor Hockey Association championships with the York Simcoe Express, but he left the team in 2011 to join the Toronto Marlboros of the Greater Toronto Hockey League (GTHL). There, McDavid was named the GTHL Player of the Year and the winner of the Tim Adams Memorial Trophy. He was granted exceptional player status in 2012 by Hockey Canada, which allowed him to begin playing junior ice hockey at the age of 15. The Erie Otters of the Ontario Hockey League (OHL) selected him first overall in that year's draft, and he played there until 2015. McDavid's OHL career concluded with a 2014–15 season in which he recorded 120 points and received a number of OHL and Canadian Hockey League (CHL) awards, including the Red Tilson Trophy, Wayne Gretzky 99 Award, and CHL Player of the Year awards. McDavid also represented Canada at several international competitions during this time, winning gold medals at the 2013 World U18 Championships and 2015 World Junior Championships.

After finishing his junior hockey career, McDavid joined the Oilers for their 2015–16 season. Despite missing three months of his rookie season due to a fractured clavicle, he was named to the NHL All-Rookie Team and was a finalist for the Calder Memorial Trophy. The following year, the Oilers appointed 19-year-old McDavid the youngest captain in NHL history. Recording 100 points during the 2016–17 season, at the age of 20, McDavid became the second youngest player to win the Art Ross Trophy for the leading scorer in the NHL. He was also awarded the Hart Memorial Trophy, Ted Lindsay Award, and was selected to the NHL First All-Star Team. Although the Oilers missed the Stanley Cup playoffs during the next two seasons, McDavid scored 41 goals in consecutive years. He injured his knee in the final game of the 2018–19 season but underwent a nonsurgical rehabilitation process that allowed him to return in time for the start of the 2019–20 season. In 2020–21, despite the COVID-19 pandemic shortening the NHL season to only 56 games, McDavid recorded 100 points for the fourth time in his career. In 2023–24, McDavid captained the Oilers to the Stanley Cup Final, their first since 2006. McDavid won the Conn Smythe Trophy as the most valuable player in the 2024 Stanley Cup playoffs, becoming only the sixth player, second skater, and first since Jean-Sébastien Giguère in 2003, to win the award despite not winning the Stanley Cup.

He is a four-time NHL First Team All-Star, a six-time recipient of the Art Ross Trophy, a five-time winner of the Ted Lindsay Award, a three-time recipient of the Hart Memorial Trophy, and the Maurice "Rocket" Richard Trophy winner for 2022–23 as the league's leading goal-scorer. His opponents have praised his speed on the ice, and McDavid has won Fastest Skater at the NHL All-Star Skills Competition four times. He is one of only two players – after fellow Oilers captain Wayne Gretzky in 1982 – to unanimously win the Hart Memorial Trophy as the league's most valuable player.

== Early life ==
McDavid was born on January 13, 1997, in Richmond Hill, Ontario. His mother, Kelly, played one year of recreational ice hockey as a child before turning her attention towards skiing, while his father, Brian, was a high school ice hockey player and dedicated Boston Bruins fan. McDavid began playing hockey around the age of three, practicing on rollerblades in the family basement. He began playing organized youth hockey the next year, as his parents lied about his age to allow him to play with five-year-olds. When he was six, the local youth hockey association in his hometown of Newmarket forbade McDavid to play against older children, and his parents, believing that he would be "bored out of his mind" in house league hockey, enrolled him in an Aurora, Ontario, hockey program. From there, he won four Ontario Minor Hockey Association championships with the York Simcoe Express, a team coached by his father. In 2009, McDavid participated in the Quebec International Pee-Wee Hockey Tournament with his York Simcoe team, which also featured future professional ice hockey player Sam Bennett.

In 2011, McDavid left the Express for the Toronto Marlboros of the Greater Toronto Hockey League (GTHL), the team that he and his father had defeated in the previous year's Ontario Hockey Federation championship. The decision came at a social cost, as he lost many of the friends that he had made with York Simcoe. He won the GTHL Player of the Year Award in 2012 after scoring 33 goals and recording 39 assists in 33 regular season games. McDavid added another 19 points (11 goals and eight assists) in seven OHL Cup games, the most by any player since Sam Gagner recorded 17 points in five games during the 2005 tournament. Although he received the Tim Adams Memorial Trophy as the tournament MVP, McDavid's team was defeated 2–1 in the OHL Cup final by the Mississauga Rebels.

McDavid attended Sir William Mulock Secondary School in Newmarket, Ontario, until his graduation in 2015.

== Playing career ==
=== Junior ===
Although McDavid contemplated playing NCAA Division I hockey, he decided to enter the junior ice hockey circuit as an adolescent rather than waiting to begin a college career. McDavid applied for exceptional player status through Hockey Canada, and after passing through evaluations of his athleticism, academics, and maturity, he was allowed to enter the junior hockey draft at the age of 15 rather than 16. He was only the third Ontario Hockey League (OHL) player to be granted such an exception, following John Tavares in 2005 and Aaron Ekblad in 2011. On April 7, 2012, the Erie Otters selected McDavid first overall in the 2012 OHL Priority Selection, and he signed with the team that June. As the first overall selection in that year's OHL draft, McDavid was the recipient of the 2012 Jack Ferguson Award.

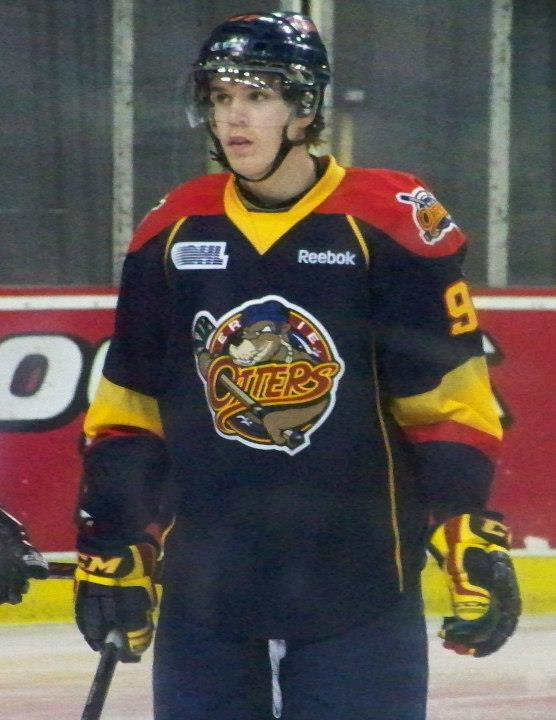
McDavid with the Erie Otters in 2013

McDavid joined the Otters for the 2012–13 season, where he scored his first OHL goal on September 21, in an 8–2 loss to the London Knights. That October, he was named the OHL Rookie of the Month after recording at least one point in all 10 games he played. He took home the award again in November with a rookie-leading 17 points in 13 games. That same month, McDavid became the youngest OHL player ever to participate in the Subway Super Series. In January and February, the physical toll of moving from minor to junior hockey, as well as frustration playing for the last-place Otters, limited McDavid's effectiveness on the ice, and his scoring began to slow.

On March 10, 2013, despite the Otters falling 6–4 to the Owen Sound Attack, McDavid picked up his 37th assist of the season, setting a franchise record for rookie assists. It was also his 62nd point of the season, tying with Tim Connolly for the most rookie points in Otters history. He recorded four more points in the regular season, breaking Connolly's record. McDavid finished his rookie season with 25 goals and 41 assists in 63 regular season games, second in scoring to Nikolay Goldobin among all OHL rookies. In addition to being named to the OHL First All-Rookie Team, McDavid took home the 2013 Emms Family Award for OHL rookie of the year. He was also a finalist for CHL Rookie of the Year, a title which went to Valentin Zykov of the Baie-Comeau Drakkar.

In contrast to their poor finish during the previous season, the Otters opened the 2013–14 season with 25 points in their first 15 games, including a 10-game winning streak. During this stretch, McDavid personally had five goals and 28 points, three points behind OHL leader and teammate Connor Brown. He was named the OHL Player of the Month in October and received another Subway Super Series selection, appearing as the youngest player in the tournament for the second year in a row. After experiencing two consecutive four-point outings in an 11–2 win against the Plymouth Whalers and 6–1 victory over the Windsor Spitfires in March, McDavid was named both the OHL and CHL Player of the Week. Later that week, his 25th goal of the season helped the Otters to reach 100 points as a team for the first time since 2001. He finished the regular season fourth in the OHL with 99 points (28 goals and 71 assists) in 56 games. His 20 penalty minutes, meanwhile, were the lowest among the top 12 scorers in the league, and McDavid was awarded the William Hanley Trophy for the most sportsmanlike player in the OHL. With a 92 per cent average at McDowell High School, McDavid both won the 2014 Bobby Smith Trophy for the OHL's Scholastic Player of the Year and was named the 2014 CHL Scholastic Player of the Year. He was also named to the OHL Second All-Star Team alongside Otters teammate Adam Pelech and coach Kris Knoblauch. The Otters, meanwhile, finished the regular season second in the OHL, and McDavid added an additional four goals and 19 points in 14 postseason games before Erie fell to the Guelph Storm in the Western Conference finals.

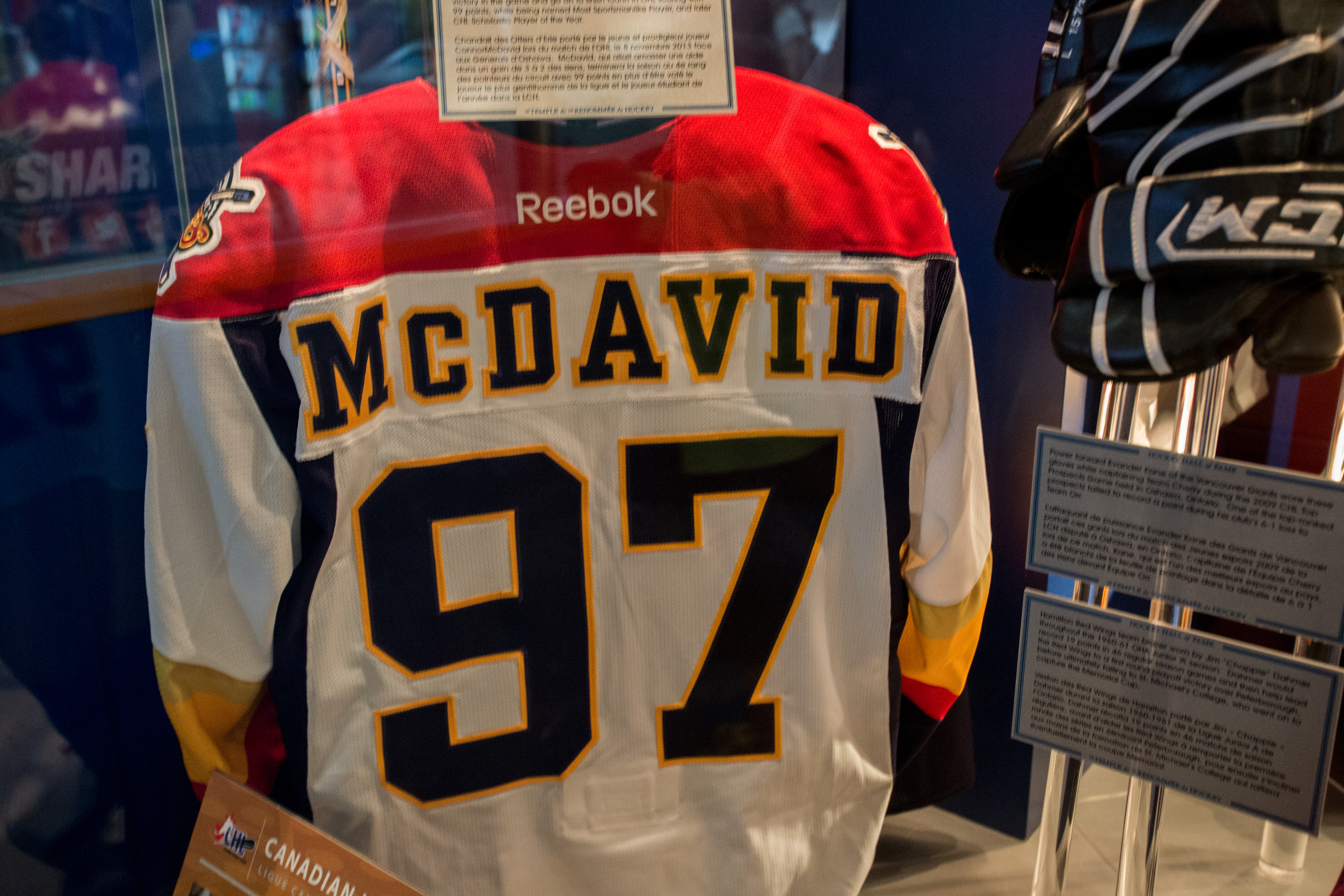
McDavid's No. 97 Erie Otters jersey on display at the Hockey Hall of Fame

The Otters named McDavid their captain for the 2014–15 season during training camp. McDavid recorded at least one point in all but one of the first 18 games of the season and led the OHL with 51 points before breaking his hand in a fight with Bryson Cianfrone of the Mississauga Steelheads on November 11. McDavid had already recorded a goal and assist at the time of his injury, giving him a Gordie Howe hat trick, but was forced to miss both the Subway Super Series and several regular season games. He missed six weeks of the regular OHL season, first to injury and then international competition, before returning on January 8 for a 4–3 defeat from the Sarnia Sting. Shortly after his return, McDavid was named the captain of Team Cherry at the 2015 CHL/NHL Top Prospects Game; teammate Dylan Strome was selected to captain Team Orr. After recording his first OHL hat-trick on February 25 against the Guelph Storm, McDavid recorded his 100th point of the season with a goal and assist against the Owen Sound Attack. He was the fourth OHL player that season to reach 100 points, doing so in only 38 games due to his injury, and was named OHL Player of the Month for February. He finished the regular season with 44 goals and 120 points in 47 games, with at least one point in all but two of those games, and he led the OHL with a +60 plus–minus rating.

At the end of the 2014–15 season, McDavid received a number of awards from the OHL and CHL. In addition to winning the Bobby Smith Trophy and CHL Scholastic Player of the Year for the second consecutive year, he was also named to the OHL First All-Star Team, received the Red Tilson Trophy for the most outstanding player in the OHL, the CHL Player of the Year title, and the CHL Top Draft Prospect Award. Although the Otters were defeated in the J. Ross Robertson Cup finals by the Oshawa Generals, McDavid recorded 21 goals and 49 points in 20 postseason games, including two goals and six points in five championship series games, and received the Wayne Gretzky 99 Award for the most valuable player in the OHL playoffs. With five individual OHL awards in his three-year career, McDavid also finished his junior hockey tenure as the most decorated player in league history. Altogether, McDavid had 285 points in his career with the Otters, 24 fewer than franchise leader Brad Boyes, and led the franchise with 188 assists.

=== Professional (2015–present) ===
==== 2015–2017: rookie season, captaincy and playoff debut ====
The Edmonton Oilers of the National Hockey League (NHL), who were coming off of a 24–44–14 season, selected McDavid first overall in the 2015 NHL entry draft. On July 3, 2015, he signed a three-year, entry-level contract with the team; the total deal was worth $11.3 million, including up to $3.775 million annually in bonus incentives. He made his NHL debut on October 9, 2015, nearly scoring twice but stopped by Brian Elliott both times in a 3–1 loss to the St. Louis Blues. His first goal came five days later in his third NHL game, when McDavid scored on Kari Lehtonen in the second period of a 4–2 loss to the Dallas Stars. On November 3, in his 13th NHL game, McDavid suffered a fractured left clavicle after a collision into the boards with Brandon Manning and Michael Del Zotto of the Philadelphia Flyers. At the time of the injury, he had five goals and 12 points through those 13 games. He missed a total of 37 games with the injury, by which point the Oilers had fallen well out of playoff contention, but returned on February 3 with a goal and two assists in Edmonton's 5–1 victory over the Columbus Blue Jackets. On February 11, while facing his hometown Toronto Maple Leafs, McDavid was involved in all five of the Oilers' points: in addition to scoring twice, he also had assists on every part of Jordan Eberle's hat trick. That single-game performance helped boost McDavid to tenth overall in NHL rookie scoring at that point, despite playing in only his 19th game of the 2015–16 season. Despite appearing in only 45 games due to injury, McDavid finished his rookie season with 16 goals and 32 assists, fourth in rookie scoring. He was third place in Calder Memorial Trophy voting, behind Shayne Gostisbehere of the Philadelphia Flyers and winner Artemi Panarin of the Chicago Blackhawks, and all three players were named to the 2015–16 NHL All-Rookie Team.

On October 5, 2016, the Oilers named McDavid their captain for the 2016–17 season. At 19 years and 266 days old, McDavid became the youngest captain in NHL history, unseating Gabriel Landeskog, who was 20 days older when he became captain of the Colorado Avalanche in September 2012. After a 10-game goal drought early in the season, McDavid recorded his first NHL hat-trick on November 19 in a 5–2 victory over the Dallas Stars. The following month, on December 18, 2016, he scored his first shootout goal against Ben Bishop to defeat the Tampa Bay Lightning 3–2. With two assists against the New Jersey Devils on January 13, McDavid became the first player to reach 50 points during the 2016–17 season. Five days later, he recorded his 100th NHL point with an assist on Zack Kassian's goal against the Florida Panthers. He reached the milestone in only 92 games, following Wayne Gretzky (61 games) and Blair MacDonald (85) as the third-fastest Oiler to reach 100 career points.

With a league-leading 16 goals and 56 points halfway through the season, McDavid earned his first NHL All-Star Game selection in 2017, playing on the same line as Anaheim Ducks rival forward Ryan Kesler for the Pacific Division team. He also won Fastest Skater at the NHL All-Star Skills Competition with a time of 13.02 seconds. In the final regular season game of the year, McDavid recorded two assists to finish the season with 100 points. In doing so, he became the youngest player (just four months past his 20th birthday) to win the Art Ross Trophy for the NHL scoring leader since a 19-year-old Sidney Crosby won in the 2006–07 season. Playing in all 82 games of the season, McDavid recorded 30 goals and 70 assists for 100 points, with at least one point in 59 games and a 14-game point streak to close out the regular season.

The Oilers ended a 10-year playoff drought on March 29, 2017, when they defeated the Los Angeles Kings to clinch a berth in the 2017 playoffs. McDavid scored his first NHL postseason goal short-handed in the Oilers' 2–0 shutout win over the San Jose Sharks in the opening-round series. Edmonton defeated the Sharks in six games of the best-of-seven series and went on to face the Anaheim Ducks in the second round. That series went to seven games, with the Oilers falling 2–1 in the winner-takes-all match. McDavid added five goals and nine points in 13 playoff games before elimination. Once the Stanley Cup playoffs concluded, McDavid was honoured at the 2017 NHL Awards with the Hart Memorial Trophy for the most valuable player in the NHL, the Ted Lindsay Award for the most outstanding player as decided by the National Hockey League Players' Association, and a selection to the NHL First All-Star Team at centre.

==== 2017–2020: team disappointments ====
On July 5, 2017, McDavid signed an eight-year, $100 million contract extension with the Oilers, which went into effect at the beginning of the 2018–19 season. His second hat-trick, meanwhile, came in the first game of the 2017–18 season, when McDavid scored every Edmonton goal in their 3–0 shutout of the Calgary Flames. With a team-leading 14 goals and 45 points by the halfway point of the season, McDavid won the fan vote to captain the Pacific Division at the 2018 NHL All-Star Game, his second such selection. He successfully defended his Fastest Skater title at the Skills Competition, completing the course in 13.454 seconds to narrowly defeat Brayden Point of the Tampa Bay Lightning. On February 5, shortly after the All-Star Game, McDavid had his first NHL four-goal game with a 6–2 win over the Lightning, breaking Edmonton's 0-for-17 power play cold streak in the process. McDavid's third hat-trick of the season came on February 18, when he broke both the Oilers' six-game losing streak and the Colorado Avalanche's 10-game at-home winning streak. While the Oilers finished the season well outside of playoff contention, finishing 17 points behind the Avalanche in the wild-card race, McDavid set career highs with 41 goals and 108 points along with 67 assists, and he led the NHL with 84 even-strength points. Although his team's poor performance left McDavid out of serious contention for the Hart Trophy, he became the first player to receive the Art Ross Trophy in back-to-back years since Jaromír Jágr in 2000 and 2001. McDavid additionally took home the Ted Lindsay Award for the second consecutive season and second time altogether and was named to the NHL First All-Star Team.

With a point in all nine of the Oilers' first goals of the 2018–19 season, McDavid broke Adam Oates' record, set in 1986–87, when Oates was involved in the Detroit Red Wings' first seven goals of the season. With an overtime goal against Chicago Blackhawks goaltender Cam Ward on October 28, McDavid became the first Oiler to record at least 17 points through the first 10 games of an NHL season since Mark Messier in 1989–90. On December 13, with two assists in his 240th NHL game, McDavid became the ninth player to reach 300 points before his 22nd birthday and tied Evgeni Malkin of the Pittsburgh Penguins as the 21st century NHL player to reach the milestone in the fewest games. While serving as the Pacific Division captain at his third consecutive NHL All-Star Game, McDavid set an NHL record with his third Fastest Skater victory, defeating Jack Eichel and Mathew Barzal with a speed of 13.378 seconds. On February 22, McDavid received a two-game suspension from the NHL Department of Player Safety for what was deemed an illegal check to the head of New York Islanders defenceman Nick Leddy. He finished the season with a career-tying 41 goals, as well as a career-high 75 assists and 116 points. On April 6, 2019, the final game of the season, McDavid crashed into the Calgary Flames' net at a velocity of over 40 km/h (25 mph), slamming his left knee into the post. He was diagnosed with a complete tear of the posterior cruciate ligament and popliteus muscle, tears to both the medial and lateral meniscus, and a tibial plateau fracture. With the Oilers already eliminated from possible playoff contention, McDavid elected not to undergo surgery but to participate in an extensive rehabilitation program that would allow him to return in time for the beginning of the next season.

The season also saw significant developments for the Oilers as a team, with general manager Peter Chiarelli sacked midway through in January 2019 after years of criticism for his inability to assemble a competitive team around McDavid. Subsequently, Ken Holland was hired as the team's new general manager. Despite the continued team difficulties, McDavid became a finalist for the Hart Memorial Trophy for the second time in his career. He came in third behind Sidney Crosby and Nikita Kucherov in Hart Trophy voting. He became the first player since Steven Stamkos in 2012 to be a top three finalist for the Hart Trophy despite being on a team that failed to qualify for the playoffs. McDavid also received his third NHL First All-Star Team selection, finishing ahead of Crosby in voting for centre.

McDavid started the 2019–20 season as the NHL First Star of the Week with 12 points through the first five games of the year, all of which the Oilers came back from behind to win. With the first goal of his hat-trick against the Anaheim Ducks on November 10, McDavid reached 400 NHL points in 306 games, joining Sidney Crosby as the only other active NHL player to reach the milestone in that many games. It was also 64 days before his 23rd birthday, making McDavid the eighth player to record 400 points before turning 23. Five days later, McDavid recorded another hat-trick as part of a career-high six-point game against the Colorado Avalanche. Although he reached 50 points on December 1 in a 3–2 win against the Vancouver Canucks, McDavid's scoring pace began to slow after his pair of hat tricks: he recorded 48 points in the first 25 games of the season but only 10 in the next nine, a stretch which also included four pointless outings. McDavid made his fourth All-Star Game appearance in 2020 as captain of the Pacific Division. He was kept from a fourth consecutive Fastest Skater win by Mathew Barzal, who finished the course in 13.175 seconds, ahead of McDavid's 13.215-second lap. With their February 9 outing against the Nashville Predators, during which Draisaitl scored twice and McDavid had an assist, the pair became the first teammates to reach 30 goals and 80 points apiece in 55 games since Mario Lemieux and Jaromír Jágr with the Pittsburgh Penguins during the 1996–97 season. McDavid injured his knee in a collision with Dante Fabbro during the second period of that game, and although the knee itself did not suffer any serious damage, MRI scans revealed a quadriceps injury. He missed six games before returning on February 23 for a three-point outing in the Oilers' 4–2 victory over the Los Angeles Kings. By the time that the NHL indefinitely suspended the season on March 12 due to the COVID-19 pandemic, McDavid had 34 goals, 63 assists and 97 points in 64 games. When the NHL returned to play that July for the 2020 playoffs, McDavid was one of 31 skaters that the Oilers took into their quarantine bubble. He added an additional five goals and nine points in four postseason games before the Chicago Blackhawks eliminated the Oilers in the qualifying round. That included a postseason hat-trick in game two to help the Oilers to a 6–3 win.

==== 2021–2025: Stanley Cup Final appearances and Conn Smythe Trophy ====
On January 14, 2021, in the second game of the pandemic-shortened 2020–21 season, McDavid scored the first hat-trick of any player that year as the Oilers won 5–2 against the Vancouver Canucks. With eight goals and 14 assists in the first 11 games of the season, McDavid joined Wayne Gretzky as the only Oilers in history to reach 20 points in 11 games during back-to-back seasons, a feat for which he was named the NHL North Division Star of the Month for January. His 500th career point came on an assist against the Winnipeg Jets on February 17. The point came in McDavid's 369th NHL game, tying Sidney Crosby as the eighth-fastest player to reach the milestone. Four days later, he had a natural hat-trick and a five-point game in a 7–1 rout of the Calgary Flames. He won the North Division Star of the Month again for March after recording 23 points in 14 games, including an 11-game point streak between March 6 and 29. On May 9, 2021, in only the 53rd game of the pandemic-shortened season, McDavid reached his 100th point of the year in a four-point outing against the Canucks. He was the first player to reach the milestone in so few games since Mario Lemieux during the 1995–96 season. He finished the season with 33 goals and a league-leading 72 assists for a league-leading 105 points in all 56 games, 21 more than runner-up and teammate Leon Draisaitl, and took home his third career Art Ross Trophy. At the end of the regular season, he was named to his fourth NHL First All-Star Team, won his third Ted Lindsay Award, and joined Wayne Gretzky as the only players in the 97-year history of the award to win the Hart Memorial Trophy by unanimous selection. The Oilers were unexpectedly swept by the Winnipeg Jets in the first round of the 2021 playoffs, with McDavid recording only one goal and three assists in the four-game series. The officiating standards during the playoffs subsequently became a public point of contention, with McDavid joining many fans and commentators in saying that referees allowed the Jets' players to foul him with impunity. It was noted that McDavid did not draw a single penalty during the series against the Jets, and had only drawn one in the preceding year's playoff series against the Chicago Blackhawks. McDavid asked that referees "call the rule book, that's what it's there for."

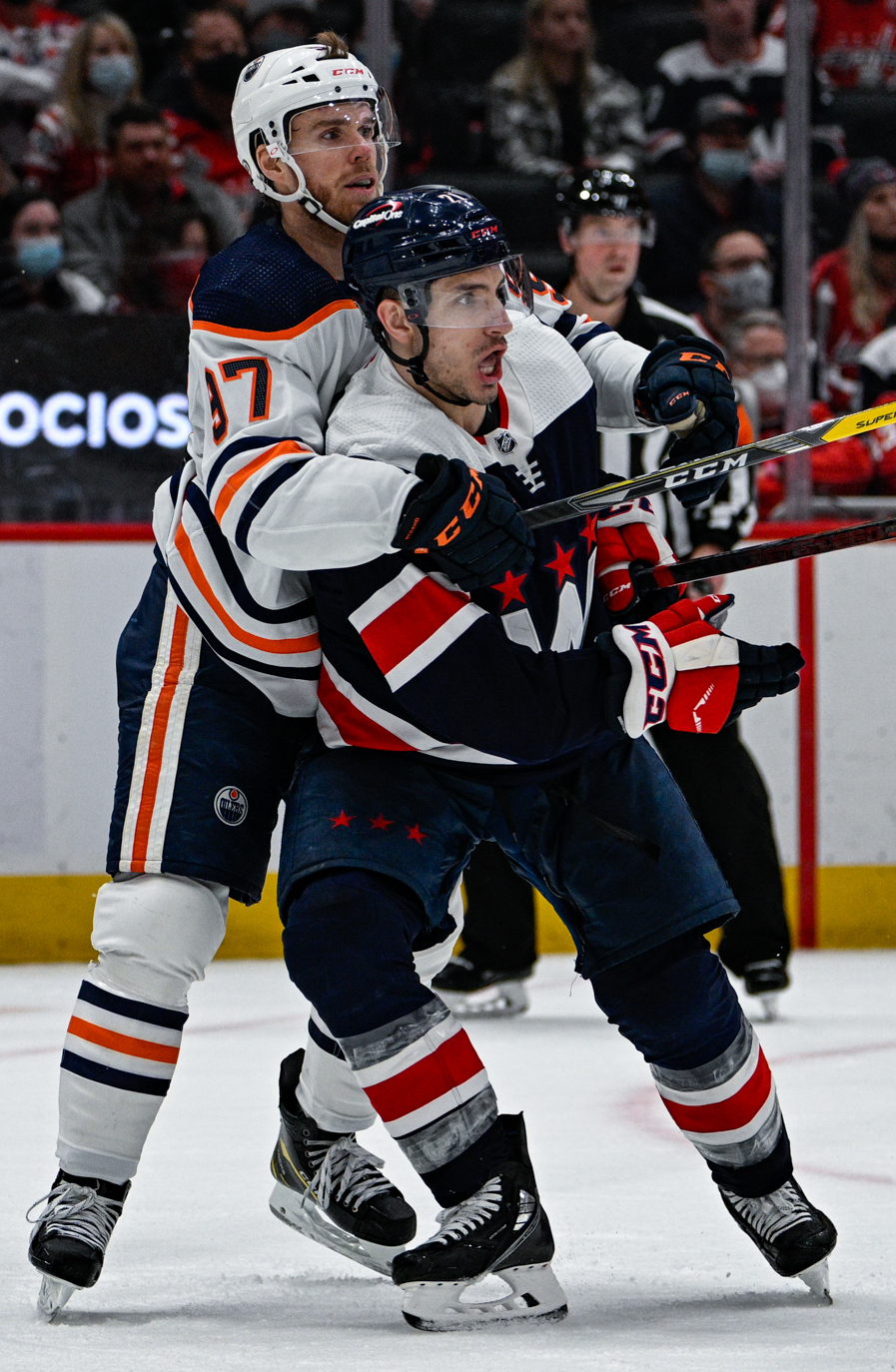
McDavid (left) defends against Garnet Hathaway in February 2022

McDavid began the 2021–22 season on a 17-game point streak, which came to an end on November 23, 2021, in a 4–1 loss to the Dallas Stars. It was the eighth-longest point streak to begin a season in NHL history and the third-longest for the Oilers, behind Wayne Gretzky's 51- and 30-game streaks in 1983–84 and 1982–83, respectively. While the Oilers started the season with a franchise-best 9–1 record, McDavid and Draisaitl became the first pair of Edmonton teammates to individually reach 20 points within the first 10 games of the season since Gretzky and Jari Kurri in 1984–85. After an excellent start to the season, both the Oilers and McDavid began suffering a marked decline in results, culminating in a 2–11–2 stretch of games in December and January. By early February, they had dropped out of a playoff spot. Amidst extensive media discussion of the Oilers' lack of depth scoring and questionable goaltending, general manager Holland fired coach Dave Tippett and replaced him with Jay Woodcroft, previously the coach of the Oilers AHL affiliate Bakersfield Condors. McDavid was once again selected as the captain of the Pacific Division team at the 2022 NHL All-Star Game, where he was upset by Jordan Kyrou of the St. Louis Blues in the Fastest Skater competition. The Oilers recovered their form under Woodcroft, finishing the season in second place in the Pacific Division to qualify for the playoffs after posting the third-best points percentage in the league after the coaching change with a 26–9–3 record. McDavid finished the season with 44 goals, 79 assists and 123 points in 80 games to secure his fourth career Art Ross Trophy. This point total was eight points more than runner-up Johnny Gaudreau of the Calgary Flames and Jonathan Huberdeau of the Florida Panthers, who both finished with 115 points. McDavid was again named a finalist for both the Hart Trophy and the Ted Lindsay Award. The Oilers advanced in the 2022 playoffs to meet the Los Angeles Kings, seen as favourites to advance beyond the first round for only the second time in McDavid's career. The Kings proved a greater challenge than many had expected, and after five games led the series 3–2. With the Oilers facing elimination in game six in Los Angeles, McDavid led the team to victory, posting a goal and two assists in a game-leading 24:02 minutes of ice time to force game seven. Two days later, McDavid had a primary assist on Cody Ceci's game-winning goal, before burying a backhand shot in the final minutes to secure a 2–0 Oilers win and clinch the series. McDavid's four goals and 10 assists led the league in the first round of the playoffs, and he became only the second player in history to record six multi-point games in a single playoff series. The Oilers drew the Calgary Flames in the second round, the first playoff "Battle of Alberta" in 31 years. With two goals and four assists in the first two games of the second round, McDavid hit 20 career playoff points in the fewest games of any player in 30 years. McDavid scored the series-clinching goal in overtime in game five to send the Oilers to the Western Conference final for the first time since 2006. The Oilers were ultimately defeated by the top-seeded Colorado Avalanche, the eventual Stanley Cup champions, in a four-game sweep, bringing the postseason to an end. With 10 goals and 23 assists for a total of 33 points, he led all players in scoring in the 2022 playoffs. He became the first player since Peter Forsberg in 2002 to be first in scoring without playing in the final round.

On October 12, 2022, during the Oilers' 2022–23 season opener against the Vancouver Canucks, McDavid scored a hat-trick and increased his total career points to 700. This made him the sixth-fastest player in NHL history to reach the milestone, and the fastest player since the 1980s. In a season marked by increased scoring generally across the league, McDavid once again led the league in points from the beginning, this time while also scoring goals at the highest pace of his career thus far. On January 22, McDavid scored his 40th goal of the season in a win over the Vancouver Canucks, becoming the fastest NHL player to notch 40 goals in a season since Pavel Bure during the 1999–2000 season. McDavid reached 800 career points against the Philadelphia Flyers in a February 21 game, the fifth-fastest pace of any player in league history. That game was the first of four consecutive two-goal games that saw him reach the 50-goal mark for the first time in a single season on February 27. He notched a fifth consecutive two-goal game on March 1, becoming only the fifth player in league history to do so. With a goal and an assist in a game against the Ottawa Senators on March 14, he reached 129 points on the season, surpassing Nikita Kucherov's 21st-century record set four years prior in 2018–19. He then reached the 60-goal mark for the first time in his career on March 22, scoring the game-winning goal in overtime against the Arizona Coyotes. He was only the fourth player to do so in the 21st century, and, in 72 games, reached it faster than anyone since Mario Lemieux in 1995-96. McDavid scored his 64th goal on April 8, which made him the sixth player in NHL history to hit the 150-point threshold, whilst leading the league in goals for the first time in his career. He finished the season with 64 goals and 153 points, winning his fifth (and third consecutive) Art Ross Trophy and, for the first time in his career, earning the Maurice "Rocket" Richard Trophy for leading the NHL in goal-scoring. He was the first Oiler to win the Richard Trophy, and the first to lead the NHL in goals since Gretzky in 1986–87. His 64 goals were one short of Alexander Ovechkin's post-lockout record of 65 in the 2007–08 season. His 153 points were the most for a player since Lemieux in 1996, and the fourth-most for any player in NHL history, behind Gretzky, Lemieux and Steve Yzerman. The Canadian Broadcasting Corporation dubbed it "the season of the century." He was once again named finalist for both the Hart Memorial Trophy and the Ted Lindsay Award. Winning both awards, he finished the season with four individual player trophies. He received 195 of 196 first-place votes for the Hart Trophy, narrowly missing a second unanimous win.

The Oilers finished second in the Pacific Division and sixth in the league, qualifying for the 2023 playoffs. They drew the Los Angeles Kings in the first round for the second consecutive year, entering as the favourite to advance. The Oilers ousted the Kings in six games, with McDavid and Draisaitl again credited as dominant forces in the contest, and moved to face the Vegas Golden Knights in the second round. The second round matchup attracted media attention due to the presence of Jack Eichel on the Golden Knights roster, as Eichel had been drafted second overall in the same year as McDavid and was viewed at the time as a potential career rival, though the narrative had largely faded in the following years due to neither party's interest in establishing further tension, Eichel's original Buffalo Sabres team from 2015 to 2021 not achieving much success, and the Sabres being in a different division and conference than the Oilers. The Oilers were ultimately defeated by the eventual Stanley Cup champion Golden Knights in a six-game series, bringing their postseason to an end.

In the summer 2023 off-season, the Oilers hired Jeff Jackson, McDavid's longtime agent, to serve as the CEO of hockey operations. McDavid vowed that it would be "Cup or bust" for the team going into the 2023–24 season. The team had a "disastrous" start to the season, winning only two of their first ten games and sitting second-to-last in the NHL. McDavid missed games due to injury in this period, and at the same point was tied for 57th in league scoring. On November 12, the team fired coach Woodcroft and replaced him with Kris Knoblauch, who had previously been McDavid's coach with the Erie Otters. At the time of the coaching change, the Oilers had a 3–9–1 record. The Athletic remarked that the hirings of Jackson and Knoblauch "have put the spotlight squarely on McDavid," given their prior relations to him. The team's fortunes soon revived under Knoblauch, and McDavid saw his scoring surge. On April 15, 2024, McDavid recorded his 100th assist of the 2023–24 season on a goal by Zach Hyman in a 9–2 win over the San Jose Sharks to become the first NHL player in over three decades and the fourth player in NHL history (alongside Wayne Gretzky, Mario Lemieux and Bobby Orr) to achieve the feat. After ending the season with 32 goals and 100 assists for 132 points in 76 games, McDavid and the Oilers eliminated the Los Angeles Kings in the first round for the third straight season in five games, the Vancouver Canucks in seven games and the Dallas Stars in six games in the third round to help clinch the Oilers first appearance in the Stanley Cup Final since 2006. After losing the first three games of the series against the Florida Panthers, McDavid led the team on a comeback to avert elimination with a historic scoring surge in the next two games. In game four, he registered his 32nd assist of the playoffs on a goal by Dylan Holloway, breaking Wayne Gretzky's record for most assists in one playoff year in an 8–1 victory. Following a dominant performance in which he scored four points during a 5–3 victory in the fifth game, McDavid achieved a historic feat by becoming the first player in NHL history to achieve back-to-back games with four points or more in the Stanley Cup Final series. Additionally, he also holds the record for most points accumulated over two games in the Stanley Cup Final. The Oilers forced the series to seven games, but were ultimately defeated. McDavid was awarded the Conn Smythe Trophy as the most valuable player of the postseason. He was the sixth person from the losing finalist team to receive the award, only the second forward (after Reggie Leach in 1976) to do so, and the first person since Jean-Sébastien Giguère of the Mighty Ducks of Anaheim in 2003. McDavid did not accept the trophy when it was presented on the ice and remained with his teammates in the locker room, later commenting that "[he] wouldn't have gone out there for a million dollars."

On January 20, 2025, McDavid was handed a three-game suspension for cross-checking of Conor Garland in a game against the Vancouver Canucks on January 18, 2025. McDavid tied for the lead in points in the 2025 playoffs with teammate Leon Draisaitl, with seven goals and 33 points in 21 playoff games, but the Oilers once again lost to the Florida Panthers in the Cup Final, four games to two.

==== 2025–present: contract renewal, sixth Art Ross and fifth Ted Lindsay ====
On October 6, 2025, McDavid signed a two-year extension to remain with the Oilers for an average annual value of $12.5 million. McDavid's 2025–26 season saw him lead the league in points (138) and assists (90), winning his sixth Art Ross Trophy; this tied Gordie Howe and Mario Lemieux for the second-most scoring titles in league history. He recorded points in all 41 of Edmonton's wins, and had a career-high point streak of 20 games, in which he had 19 goals and 27 assists for 46 points. He was named a finalist for the Ted Lindsay Award and the Hart Memorial Trophy, for the seventh time in both cases. The Oilers qualified for the 2026 Stanley Cup playoffs, but were ousted by the Anaheim Ducks in the first round, four games to two. McDavid would say afterward that "we were an average team all year; an average team with high expectations, you're going to be disappointed. We just never found it." On June 7, 2026, it was announced McDavid was voted as the winner of the Ted Lindsay Award for the fifth time; tying him with Wayne Gretzky for most award wins.

On October 21, McDavid became the fastest player in NHL history to reach 20 assists in a season, doing so in his ninth game of the 2026–27 season. The next game, McDavid broke Mario Lemieux's record for the most assists in the first ten games of a season, with twenty-three. On October 28, McDavid had two assists in a 4–0 win over the Calgary Flames, extending his season opening assist streak to 13 games, breaking the record previously held by Gretzky, Ken Linseman, and Sebastian Aho. His assist streak ended at 18 games on November 9, in a 3–1 win over the New York Rangers, although he still recorded a goal. On November 17, McDavid surpassed Gretzky as the all-time power-play points leader for the Oilers, surpassing Gretzky's mark of 440.

== International play ==
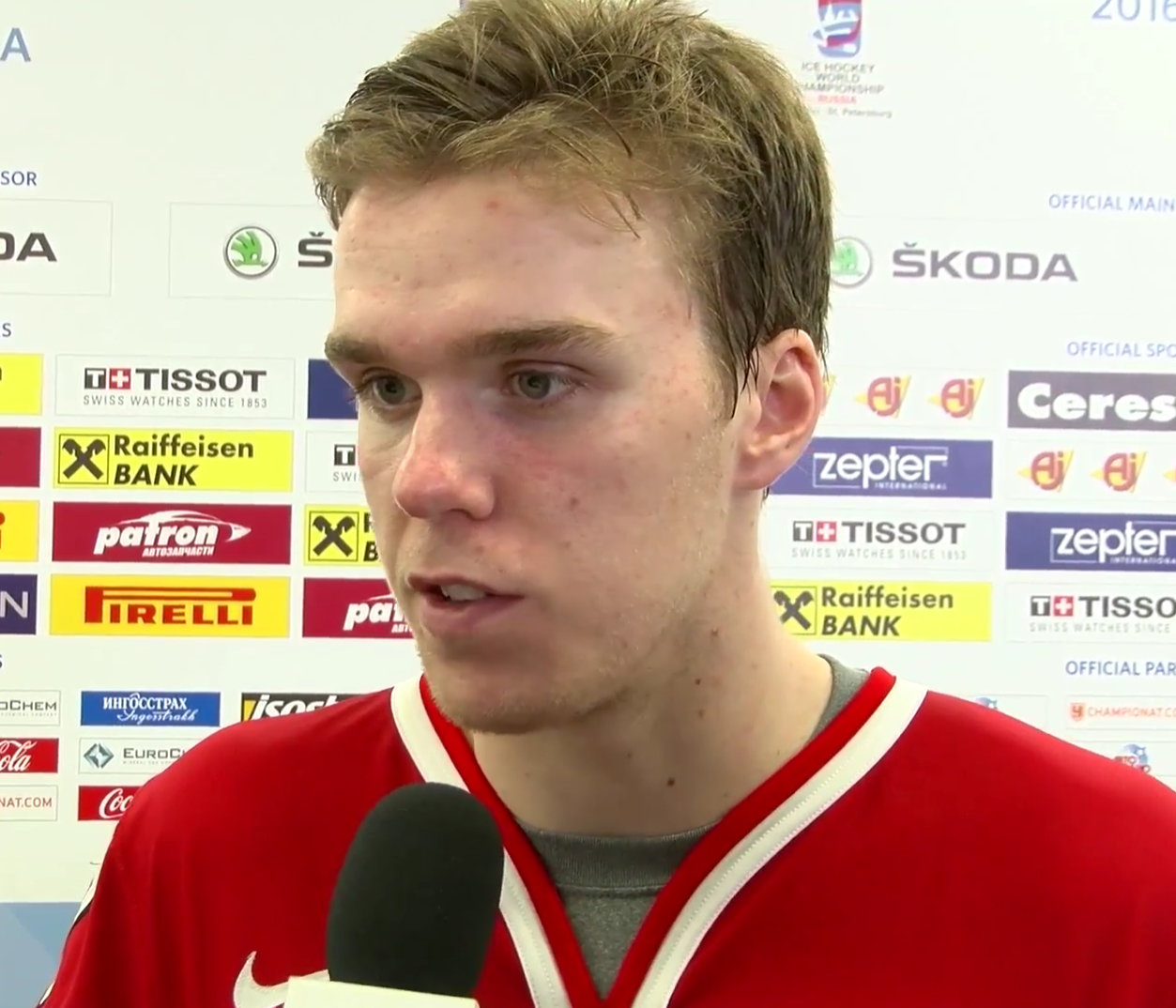
- McDavid with Canada in 2016

Medal record

Men's ice hockey

Representing Canada

Winter Olympics
| Silver medal – second place | 2026 Milano Cortina | |

World Championships
| Gold medal – first place | 2016 Russia | |

4 Nations Face-Off
| Winner | 2025 Canada/United States | |

World Junior Championships
| Gold medal – first place | 2015 Canada | |

World U18 Championships
| Gold medal – first place | 2013 Russia | |

=== Junior ===
McDavid's international ice hockey career began with the 2013 World U-17 Hockey Challenge, where he led the sixth-place Team Ontario with nine points in five games, including two goals and an assist in their 7–6 tournament-ending loss to Team Pacific. Despite his team's disappointing performance, McDavid was named to the tournament all-star team. The next year, a 16-year-old McDavid was the youngest player in the 2013 World U18 Championships. Playing for the Canada men's national under-18 ice hockey team, he skated on a line with Sam Reinhart and Sam Bennett, recording two goals and two assists in Canada's 4–1 opening-round win over Slovakia. He led the tournament in scoring with eight goals and 14 assists, including a hat-trick during Canada's 6–0 quarterfinal win over the Czech Republic. Canada defeated the United States team 3–2 in the gold medal match, breaking United States' four-year championship streak, and McDavid was named both the Best Forward and Tournament MVP after the win.

In 2014, McDavid became the sixth 16-year-old in history to join the Canadian junior team for that year's World Junior Championships. Although McDavid recorded a goal and three assists in the tournament, he went pointless in the last three games and spent most of the bronze medal match, in which Canada fell 2–1 to Russia, on the bench. He rejoined the team for the 2015 World Junior Championships, serving as an alternate captain and as the only 17-year-old on a team that was otherwise 19 years of age. Canada took the gold medal in the tournament, defeating Russia 5–4 in the championship match, and McDavid's 11 points (three goals and eight assists) tied Sam Reinhart and Nic Petan for first in the tournament. He was named to the media all-star team at the end of the championships.

=== Senior ===
McDavid first joined the Canadian senior team for the 2016 World Championship. Although he had eight assists in the tournament, McDavid did not score a goal until the gold-medal match against Finland, who the Canadians shut out 2–0 to win the tournament. McDavid's was the only goal of the game until the final second, when Matt Duchene scored in the opposition's empty net. That same year, McDavid was named captain of Team North America, a team of Canadian and American players aged 23 or under, at the 2016 World Cup of Hockey. Centring a line with Auston Matthews and Mark Scheifele, McDavid had three assists in six games during the pre-tournament and round robin stages of the World Cup. Team North America was eliminated after the round-robin portion of the tournament, with Russia winning the tiebreaker.

Two years later, McDavid was named captain of Canada at the 2018 World Championship, where he recorded five goals and 13 points through the opening rounds of the tournament. With a 4–1 loss to the United States team in the bronze medal game, Canada finished the World Championship without a medal for the first time since 2014. McDavid, who was joined by Oilers teammates Ryan Nugent-Hopkins and Darnell Nurse, finished the tournament third in scoring with five goals and 17 points in 10 games. McDavid intended to play for Canada again at the 2019 World Championship, but suffered a leg injury at the end of the NHL season that kept him from participating.

McDavid was one of the first three players named to the Canadian roster for the 2022 Winter Olympics, joining Sidney Crosby and Alex Pietrangelo. However, in December 2021, the NHL declared that no players would be allowed to participate in the Winter Olympics, citing COVID-19 outbreaks throughout the league. McDavid, who had already missed a chance to participate in the 2018 Winter Olympics due to financial concerns from the NHL, was upset with the league's decision, saying, "It's always been a dream of mine to play at the Olympics since I was a little kid. So to have that kind of squashed as we were getting close was disappointing."

McDavid was one of the first six players named to Canada's roster for the 4 Nations Face-Off, and was later named alternate captain. Recording three goals, including the game- and tournament-winning goal in the final matchup against the United States, and five points in four games, he finished the tournament second in scoring. Canada's victory marked McDavid's first international gold medal since 2016, and his first in a senior-level "best on best" tournament. For his performance in the event final, he was named Player of the Game.

On December 31, 2025, McDavid was named to Canada's team for the 2026 Winter Olympics, the first edition with full NHL participation since 2014. He was subsequently named one of the team's alternate captains. McDavid recorded nine points through Canada's first three games in the tournament, breaking Jonathan Toews' record for the most points in a single Olympics by a Canadian NHL player, which Toews had held since 2010. McDavid recorded his ninth assist of the tournament on February 18, setting the record for the most assists in a single Olympics by an NHL player, as well as tying the record for the most points in a single tournament. Following an injury to Canadian captain Sidney Crosby in the team's quarterfinal contest with Czechia, McDavid assumed the captaincy for the semifinal against Finland on February 20. Canada defeated the Finns 3–2 to reach the championship final, while he recorded two assists, which raised his point total for the tournament to 12, a new record for an NHL player in a single Olympics. With Crosby still injured, McDavid retained Canada's captaincy for the gold medal game, where Canada ultimately lost to the United States 2–1, receiving the silver medal. McDavid was voted the most valuable player of the tournament, as well as the best forward, and was named to the Olympic All-Star Team, making him the first player to win both the Conn Smythe and Olympic MVP in losing scenarios.

== Player profile ==
Nicknamed "McJesus", McDavid is considered by fellow players, fans, and sportswriters to be one of the best players in the modern era of the NHL, with frequent comparisons to elite offensive players such as Sidney Crosby. Responding to a 2017 survey from the Associated Press, defenceman Seth Jones described McDavid as "what Crosby was when he was 20", while Boston Bruins goaltender Tuukka Rask said that McDavid "just skates and he stick handles and it's something I've never seen before as a goalie". Between 2016 and 2021, McDavid ranked first in TSN Hockey's preseason fan poll of the top 50 players in the NHL. The NHLPA also voted McDavid the best forward in the league in both 2019 and 2020. In 2021, McDavid joined Gretzky as the only players to unanimously win the Hart Memorial Trophy, as voted by members of the Professional Hockey Writers' Association.

Through his first five seasons in the NHL, McDavid's 1.34 points per game have been on par with Crosby and Alexander Ovechkin. When asked by ESPN in 2016 what made McDavid such a strong player, several, including Auston Matthews, Ryan Getzlaf, Joe Thornton, and Brendan Gallagher, mentioned his speed on the ice. John Tavares praised McDavid's adaptability, while defenceman Cam Fowler said, "I don't think there's a specific way to shut him down." In 2021, Gretzky praised McDavid's increased maturity and physicality compared to previous seasons, saying, "His body language is that he doesn't want to lose, and it's infectious through the hockey club." Despite the praise for the offensive aspects of his game, McDavid has received criticism from sports journalists for his defensive elements, particularly his high rate of turning over the puck to his opponents while in the Oilers' defensive zone.

== Personal life ==
McDavid met his wife, interior designer Lauren Kyle, in 2016 after they were set up on a blind date by Kyle's cousin and her cousin's then-boyfriend Luke Gazdic, who was McDavid's teammate at the time. The pair live with their dog, a miniature Bernedoodle named Lenard, and own a house together in Edmonton. After photos of the house were featured in EDify magazine in 2020 and video tour was recorded in 2021 for Architectural Digest, the minimalist design and the grim view of the Edmonton River Valley outside became an Internet meme.

McDavid and Kyle became engaged on June 22, 2023, and got married on July 27, 2024, in Muskoka, Ontario. The wedding was featured in Vogue Australia. Edmonton Oilers teammates Leon Draisaitl and Darnell Nurse were two of his groomsmen. Draisaitl's wife, Canadian actress Celeste Desjardins, has been Kyle's best friend since they were in high school together in Sudbury, Ontario; Kyle had originally set them up in 2018, and they married in 2025.

As a sports fan in Ontario, McDavid was a dedicated childhood fan of Mats Sundin and the Toronto Maple Leafs NHL team. He described his childhood bedroom as "pretty embarrassing" for its volume of Maple Leafs memorabilia. In 2023, he stated that he "likes watching players more than teams", and named the Maple Leafs and the Pittsburgh Penguins as the two teams he most enjoys watching for that reason. Outside of hockey, he supports the Toronto Blue Jays of Major League Baseball and threw out the ceremonial first pitch at a Blue Jays game in 2016.

On June 21, 2017, Electronic Arts revealed that McDavid would be the cover athlete for NHL 18, their annual installment of the NHL video game series. Additionally, McDavid's unique skating style inspired the Real Player Motion technology used in NHL 19, in which player size and other attributes affect their skating speed and power. In 2022, McDavid was one of several Canadian athletes to appear on boxes of Cheerios cereal as part of their "Be the Cheer" promotion, in which customers could write personalized messages to athletes competing at the Olympic Games. That same year, McDavid became the first active professional athlete to serve as a brand ambassador for sports betting company BetMGM.

McDavid has stated, and his wife has further confirmed in podcast interviews, that he has a long-time phobia of ketchup.

== Philanthropy ==
McDavid is involved in charitable efforts with Edmonton's Indigenous community and has raised $85,000 to help Indigenous children play sports. He is also involved in a shuttle program to help sick kids.

== Career statistics ==
=== Regular season and playoffs ===
Career statistics derived from Elite Prospects.
Bold indicates led league.
Bold italics indicates NHL record.

| | | | Regular season | | | | | Playoffs |
| Season | Team | League | GP | G | A | Pts | PIM | GP | G | A | Pts | PIM |
|---|---|---|---|---|---|---|---|---|---|---|---|---|
| 2011–12 | Toronto Marlboros | GTHL U16 AAA | 88 | **79** | **130** | **209** | — | — | — | — | — | — |
| 2011–12 | Toronto Marlboros | GTHL U16 | 33 | 27 | 50 | 77 | 14 | — | — | — | — | — |
| 2012–13 | Erie Otters | OHL | 63 | 25 | 41 | 66 | 36 | — | — | — | — | — |
| 2013–14 | Erie Otters | OHL | 57 | 28 | 71 | 99 | 20 | 14 | 4 | 15 | 19 | 2 |
| 2014–15 | Erie Otters | OHL | 47 | 44 | 76 | 120 | 48 | 20 | **21** | **28** | **49** | 12 |
| 2015–16 | Edmonton Oilers | NHL | 45 | 16 | 32 | 48 | 18 | — | — | — | — | — |
| 2016–17 | Edmonton Oilers | NHL | 82 | 30 | **70** | **100** | 26 | 13 | 5 | 4 | 9 | 2 |
| 2017–18 | Edmonton Oilers | NHL | 82 | 41 | 67 | **108** | 26 | — | — | — | — | — |
| 2018–19 | Edmonton Oilers | NHL | 78 | 41 | 75 | 116 | 20 | — | — | — | — | — |
| 2019–20 | Edmonton Oilers | NHL | 64 | 34 | 63 | 97 | 28 | 4 | 5 | 4 | 9 | 2 |
| 2020–21 | Edmonton Oilers | NHL | 56 | 33 | **72** | **105** | 20 | 4 | 1 | 3 | 4 | 0 |
| 2021–22 | Edmonton Oilers | NHL | 80 | 44 | 79 | **123** | 45 | 16 | 10 | 23 | **33** | 10 |
| 2022–23 | Edmonton Oilers | NHL | 82 | **64** | **89** | **153** | 36 | 12 | 8 | 12 | 20 | 0 |
| 2023–24 | Edmonton Oilers | NHL | 76 | 32 | **100** | 132 | 30 | 25 | 8 | **34** | **42** | 10 |
| 2024–25 | Edmonton Oilers | NHL | 67 | 26 | 74 | 100 | 37 | 22 | 7 | **26** | **33** | 4 |
| 2025–26 | Edmonton Oilers | NHL | 82 | 48 | **90** | **138** | 44 | 6 | 1 | 5 | 6 | 2 |
| NHL totals | | | 794 | 409 | 811 | 1,220 | 330 | 102 | 45 | 111 | 156 | 30 |

=== International ===
Bold indicates led tournament.

| Year | Team | Event | Result | GP | G | A | Pts | PIM |
|---|---|---|---|---|---|---|---|---|
| 2013 | Canada | U18 | 1st place, gold medalist(s) | 7 | **8** | **6** | **14** | 2 |
| 2014 | Canada | WJC | 4th | 7 | 1 | 3 | 4 | 4 |
| 2015 | Canada | WJC | 1st place, gold medalist(s) | 7 | 3 | **8** | **11** | 0 |
| 2016 | Canada | WC | 1st place, gold medalist(s) | 10 | 1 | 8 | 9 | 6 |
| 2016 | North America | WCH | 5th | 3 | 0 | 3 | 3 | 4 |
| 2018 | Canada | WC | 4th | 10 | 5 | **12** | 17 | 10 |
| 2025 | Canada | 4NF | 1st place, gold medalist(s) | 4 | 3 | 2 | 5 | 0 |
| 2026 | Canada | OG | 2nd place, silver medalist(s) | 6 | 2 | **11** | **13** | 0 |
| Junior totals | | | | 21 | 12 | 17 | 29 | 6 |
| Senior totals | | | | 33 | 11 | 36 | 47 | 20 |

=== All-Star Games ===
| Year | Location | G | A | Pts |
|---|---|---|---|---|
| 2017 | Los Angeles | 2 | 2 | 4 |
| 2018 | Tampa Bay | 0 | 4 | 4 |
| 2019 | San Jose | 0 | 1 | 1 |
| 2020 | St. Louis | 0 | 4 | 4 |
| 2022 | Las Vegas | 0 | 0 | 0 |
| 2023 | Sunrise | 1 | 0 | 1 |
| 2024 | Toronto | 1 | 2 | 3 |
| Totals | | 4 | 13 | 17 |

- All statistics are taken from NHL.com.

== Awards and honours ==
| Award | Year | Ref. |
GTHL
| Player of the Year | 2012 | |
| Tim Adams Memorial Trophy | 2012 | |
OHL
| Jack Ferguson Award | 2012 | |
| Emms Family Award | 2013 | |
| OHL First All-Rookie Team | 2013 | |
| William Hanley Trophy | 2014 | |
| Bobby Smith Trophy | 2014, 2015 | |
| OHL Second All-Star Team | 2014 | |
| Red Tilson Trophy | 2015 | |
| OHL First All-Star Team | 2015 | |
| Wayne Gretzky 99 Award | 2015 | |
CHL
| Subway Super Series participant | 2012, 2013 | |
| CHL Scholastic Player of the Year | 2014, 2015 | |
| CHL/NHL Top Prospects Game (Team Cherry captain) | 2015 | |
| CHL Player of the Year | 2015 | |
| CHL Top Draft Prospect Award | 2015 | |
NHL
| NHL All-Rookie Team | 2016 | |
| NHL All-Star Game appearance (*captain) | 2017*, 2018*, 2019*, 2020*, 2022*, 2023, 2024* | |
| NHL All-Star Skills Competition Fastest Skater | 2017, 2018, 2019, 2024 | |
| NHL All-Star Skills Competition Stick Handling | 2024 | |
| NHL All-Star Skills Competition Accuracy Shooting | 2024 | |
| NHL All-Star Skills Competition Golden Skate champion | 2024 | |
| EA Sports NHL cover athlete | 2018 | |
| Art Ross Trophy | 2017, 2018, 2021, 2022, 2023, 2026 | |
| Hart Memorial Trophy | 2017, 2021, 2023 | |
| Ted Lindsay Award | 2017, 2018, 2021, 2023, 2026 | |
| Maurice "Rocket" Richard Trophy | 2023 | |
| NHL First All-Star Team | 2017, 2018, 2019, 2021, 2023, 2026 | |
| Best NHL Player ESPY Award | 2022, 2023, 2024, 2026 | |
| NHL Second All-Star Team | 2022, 2024 | |
| Conn Smythe Trophy | 2024 | |
Edmonton Oilers
| Molson Cup | 2017, 2018 | |
| Most Popular Player | 2016, 2017, 2018 | |
| Top First Year Oiler | 2016 | |
| Zane Feldman Trophy | 2017, 2018 | |
International
| World U-17 Hockey Challenge All-Star Team | 2013 | |
| IIHF World U18 Championship Best Forward | 2013 | |
| IIHF World U18 Championship Most Valuable Player | 2013 | |
| IIHF World Junior Championship Media All-Star Team | 2015 | |
| Winter Olympics Best Forward | 2026 | |
| Winter Olympics Most Valuable Player | 2026 | |
| Winter Olympics All-Star Team | 2026 | |

== Records ==
=== OHL ===
- Most individual awards given to any OHL player (5)

=== NHL ===
- Youngest captain in NHL history (19 years, 266 days at time of appointment)
- Most points on consecutive goals to begin an NHL season (9, in 2018–19 season)
- Most assists in one playoff year (34, 2024 NHL playoffs)
- Only player to record back-to-back 4-point or more games in the Stanley Cup Final (2024 Stanley Cup Final)
- Most points over a two-game stretch in the Stanley Cup Final (8, 2024 Stanley Cup Final)
- Fastest to 20 assists in a season (9 games, in 2026–27 season)
- Most assists in the first 10 games of a season (23, in 2026–27 season)
- Fastest to 30 assists in a season (15 games, in 2026–27 season)
- Longest season-opening assist streak (18 games, in 2026–27 season)
- Fastest to 40 assists in a season (22 games, in 2026–27 season, tied with Wayne Gretzky)
- Most Ted Lindsay awards (5, tied with Gretzky)

==== Salary cap era (since 2005–06) ====
- Most assists in a game (6, tied with 3 others)
- Most assists in a season (100, in 2023–24, tied with Nikita Kucherov)
- Most points in a season (153, in 2022–23)
- Most power-play points in a season (71, in 2022-23)
- Highest season points per game average (1.88, in 2020–21)
- Highest career points per game average (1.54)
- Most assists in a postseason game (5)
- Most points in a postseason (42, in 2023–24)

=== Edmonton Oilers ===
- Most assists in a period (4, tied with 4 others)
- Most points in a game by a rookie (5, tied with 2 others)
- Most power-play goals in a game (3, tied with 3 others)
- Most power-play points in a season (71, in 2022–23)
- Most 20-goal seasons (10, tied with 4 others)
- Most consecutive 20-goal seasons (10, tied with 4 others)
- Most career game-winning goals (76)
- Most career overtime assists (33)
- Most career power-play assists (318)
- Most career overtime points (50)
- Most 100-point seasons (9, tied with Gretzky)
- Most 3-assist games in one playoff year (5, tied with Wayne Gretzky)
- Longest tenured captain (11 seasons, from 2016–17 to 2026–27)

=== 3-on-3 All-Star Games ===
- Most assists in one game (4, tied with Tyler Bertuzzi)
- Most career assists for one division (11, Pacific Division)
- Most career assists (13)
- Most career points (17, tied with Sidney Crosby)
- Most career games played (11)
- Most years representing one NHL team (7, Edmonton Oilers)
- Most years representing one division (6, Pacific Division)
- Most career appearances (7)

=== Winter Olympics ===
- Most points by an NHL player through the first two games of a tournament (6, in 2026)
- First NHL player to record three consecutive three-point games
- Most consecutive multi-point games by an NHL player (5, in 2026)
- Most points in a single tournament featuring NHL players (13, in 2026)
- Most assists in a single tournament featuring NHL players (11, in 2026)

Awards and achievements
| Preceded by Aaron Ekblad | Jack Ferguson Award; 2012 | Succeeded by Travis Konecny |
| Preceded by Aaron Ekblad | Emms Family Award; 2013 | Succeeded by Travis Konecny |
| Preceded by Patrick Kane; Leon Draisaitl; Nikita Kucherov | Art Ross Trophy; 2017, 2018; 2021, 2022, 2023; 2026 | Succeeded by Nikita Kucherov; Nikita Kucherov; Incumbent |
| Preceded by Auston Matthews | Maurice "Rocket" Richard Trophy; 2023 | Succeeded by Auston Matthews |
| Preceded by Patrick Kane; Leon Draisaitl; Auston Matthews | Hart Memorial Trophy; 2017; 2021; 2023 | Succeeded by Taylor Hall; Auston Matthews; Nathan MacKinnon |
| Preceded by Patrick Kane; Leon Draisaitl; Auston Matthews; Nikita Kucherov | Ted Lindsay Award; 2017, 2018; 2021; 2023; 2026 | Succeeded by Nikita Kucherov; Auston Matthews; Nathan MacKinnon; Incumbent |
| Preceded by Jonathan Marchessault | Conn Smythe Trophy; 2024 | Succeeded by Sam Bennett |
| Preceded by Aaron Ekblad | NHL first overall draft pick 2015 | Succeeded by Auston Matthews |
| Preceded by Leon Draisaitl | Edmonton Oilers first-round draft pick 2015 | Succeeded by Jesse Puljujärvi |
Sporting positions
| Preceded by Andrew Ference | Edmonton Oilers captain 2016–present | Incumbent |
