= Alexandre Picard-Hooper =

Canadian ice hockey player and financial advisor

- Born: May 25, 1987 (age 38); Boucherville, Quebec, Canada
- Occupation: financial advisor
Ice hockey career
- Height: 5 ft 10 in (178 cm)
- Weight: 176 lb (80 kg; 12 st 8 lb)
- Position: Left wing
- Shot: Left
- Played for: Saint John Sea Dogs (QMJHL); Baie-Comeau Drakkar (QMJHL); Cornwall River Kings (LNAH); Sorel-Tracy HC Carvena (LNAH); McGill University (CIS)
- NHL draft: Undrafted
- Playing career: 2008–2013

Alexandre Picard-Hooper (born May 25, 1987) is a Canadian former professional ice hockey player. He most recently played for the Cornwall River Kings of the Ligue Nord-Américaine de Hockey (LNAH) in the 2012–13 season.

The Baie-Comeau Drakkar selected Picard-Hooper in the 6th round of the 2004 Quebec Major Junior Hockey League (QMJHL) draft after playing parts of two seasons for College Charles-Lemoyne. Picard-Hooper played 3 seasons in Baie-Comeau, scoring 114 times and adding 141 assists in 207 games. He was named the QMJHL and CHL Scholastic Player of the Year in 2007, his third and final season with the Drakkar. Following that season, Picard-Hooper was then traded to the Saint John Sea Dogs. He scored 23 goals to go along with 45 assists to help lead the young Sea Dogs franchise to the QMJHL semifinals for the first time in club history.

After leaving the QMJHL after the 2008 season, Picard-Hooper played Canadian college hockey with McGill University in the Canadian Interuniversity Sport (CIS) where he was named the 2010-11 CIS Player of the Year and was awarded the Senator Joseph A. Sullivan Trophy.

Picard-Hooper joined Bélisle Picard Group and works as an Investment Advisor Associate.

== Awards and honours ==
Award	Year
Canadian Hockey League Scholastic Player of the Year	2006–07
CIS All-Canadian First Team	2010–11
Senator Joseph A. Sullivan Trophy - CIS Player of the Year	2010–11
