= John Wynne (ice hockey) =

Canadian ice hockey player

- Born: February 8, 1971 (age 54); Calgary, Alberta, Canada
- Height: 6 ft 2 in (188 cm)
- Weight: 205 lb (93 kg; 14 st 9 lb)
- Position: Defence
- Shot: Left
- Played for: HC Asiago (Serie A); Sheffield Steelers (BISL); Fresno Falcons (WCHL); New Mexico Scorpions (WPHL)
- National team: Canada
- NHL draft: Undrafted
- Playing career: 1997–2001

John Wynne (born February 8, 1971) is a Canadian retired professional ice hockey defenceman.

== Career ==
Wynne played with Canada men's national ice hockey team during the 1994–95 season. He then attended the University of Waterloo, where he excelled on the ice with the college team. He was awarded the Senator Joseph A. Sullivan Trophy as the CIAU Player of the Year for the 1995–96 season.

== Awards and honors ==
Award	Year
CIAU First-Team All-Canadian	1995–96
CIAU Player of the Year	1995–96

== See also ==
- List of University of Waterloo people
