= Senator Joseph A. Sullivan Trophy =

Award presented to the Player of the Year in U Sports

The Senator Joseph A. Sullivan Trophy, named in honour of Joseph Albert Sullivan, is presented annually to the outstanding ice hockey player (Player of the Year) in U Sports, the governing body for Canadian university athletics.

While studying to be a doctor at the University of Toronto in the 1920s, Sullivan was the goaltender for the Toronto Varsity Blues. He played with a team of graduates from the Blues representing Canada at the 1928 Winter Olympics in St. Moritz, where the team won the Gold Medal.

Like Sullivan, the fourth recipient of the Trophy, Randy Gregg of the Alberta Golden Bears, was also earning a medical degree while he played university hockey. In 1990, the Dr. Randy Gregg Award was created, honoring the U Sports ice hockey player who has exhibited outstanding achievement in ice hockey, academics, and community involvement.

== List of winners ==
A table of the winners of the annual Senator Joseph A. Sullivan Trophy.

Season	Player	Position	Team
1975-76	Jim Corsi	Goaltender	Concordia Stingers
1976-77	Ron Hawkshaw	Forward	York Yeomen
1977-78	Doug Caines	Forward	Toronto Varsity Blues
1978-79	Randy Gregg	Defence	Alberta Golden Bears
1979-80	Vince Friyia	Forward	Lakehead Thunderwolves
1980-81	Paul Stothart	Forward	Queen's Golden Gaels
1981-82	Paul Stothart	Forward	Queen's Golden Gaels
1982-83	Mark Locken	Goaltender	Saint Mary's Huskies
1983-84	Mike Ridley	Forward	Manitoba Bisons
1984-85	Rob Whistle	Defence	Laurier Golden Hawks
1985-86	John LeBlanc	Forward	UNB Reds
1986-87	Dave Quigley	Goaltender	Moncton Aigles Bleus
1987-88	Sid Cranston	Forward	Alberta Golden Bears
1988-89	Stacey Wakabayashi	Forward	Alberta Golden Bears
1989-90	Mike Bishop	Goaltender	Waterloo Warriors
1990-91	Wayne Hynes	Forward	Calgary Dinosaurs
1991-92	Shane MacEachern	Forward	UPEI Panthers
1992-93	Serge Lajoie	Defence	Alberta Golden Bears
1993-94	Duane Dennis	Forward	Acadia Axemen
1994-95	Sean Basilio	Goaltender	Western Ontario Mustangs
1995-96	John Wynne	Defence	Waterloo Warriors
1996-97	Matt Mullin	Goaltender	Guelph Gryphons
1997-98	Jean-Paul Davis	Defence	Guelph Gryphons
1998-99	Luc Belanger	Goaltender	UQTR Patriotes
1999-00	Russell Hewson	Forward	Alberta Golden Bears
2000-01	Russell Hewson	Forward	Alberta Golden Bears
2001-02	Jon Barkman	Forward	Saskatchewan Huskies
2002-03	Alexandre Tremblay	Forward	UQTR Patriotes
2003-04	Chris Stanley	Forward	Dalhousie Tigers
2004-05	Joel Scherban	Forward	Lakehead Thunderwolves
2005-06	Kevin Baker	Forward	Acadia Axemen
2006-07	Jay Langager	Defence	Lethbridge Pronghorns
2007-08	Rob Hennigar	Forward	UNB Reds
2008-09	Marc Rancourt	Forward	Saint Mary's Huskies
2009-10	Hunter Tremblay	Forward	UNB Reds
2010-11	Alexandre Picard-Hooper	Forward	McGill Redmen
2011-12	Andrew Clark	Forward	Acadia Axemen
2012-13	Lucas Bloodoff	Forward	Saint Mary's Huskies
2013-14	Liam Heelis	Forward	Acadia Axemen
2014-15	Spencer Pommells	Forward	Windsor Lancers
2015-16	Guillaume Asselin	Forward	UQTR Patriotes
2016-17	Philippe Maillet	Forward	UNB Reds
2017-18	Anthony Beauregard	Forward	Concordia Stingers
2018-19	Luke Philip	Forward	Alberta Golden Bears
2019-20	Taran Kozun	Goaltender	Saskatchewan Huskies
2020-21	season cancelled due to COVID-19 pandemic		
2021-22	Nolan Yaremko	Forward	Mount Royal Cougars
2022-23	Simon Lafrance	Forward	UQTR Patriotes
2023-24	Connor Bouchard	Forward	Mount Royal Cougars
2024-25	Clay Hanus	Defence	Mount Royal Cougars
