= Mike Torchia =

Canadian ice hockey player

- Born: February 23, 1972 (age 54) Toronto, Ontario, Canada
- Height: 5 ft 11 in (180 cm)
- Weight: 225 lb (102 kg; 16 st 1 lb)
- Position: Goaltender
- Caught: Left
- Played for: Dallas Stars
- NHL draft: 74th overall, 1991; Minnesota North Stars
- Playing career: 1992–2006

Mike Torchia (born February 23, 1972) is a Canadian former professional ice hockey goaltender. He played 6 games in the National Hockey League with the Dallas Stars during the 1994–95 season. The rest of his career, which lasted from 1992 to 2006, was mainly spent in the minor leagues.

== Biography ==
Torchia was born in Toronto, Ontario. As a youth, he played in the 1985 Quebec International Pee-Wee Hockey Tournament with the Toronto Marlboros minor ice hockey team. He played on the same backyard rink with Eric Lindros growing up as a kid in Toronto.

Torchia was named to the Memorial Cup All-Star Team in 1990, and won the Hap Emms Memorial Trophy at the 1990 Memorial Cup. He was also named an Ontario Hockey League first team all-star in 1991.

Torchia was drafted 74th overall by the Minnesota North Stars in the 1991 NHL entry draft. In his six career National Hockey League games for the Dallas Stars during the 1994–95 NHL season, he registered a record of three wins, two losses, and one tie with a GAA of 3.30 and an .895 save percentage.

Torchia was named to the ISL Second All-Star team in 2001.

Torchia was later a colour commentator for the Kitchener Rangers on 570 News.

Torchia is the defending champion in the Pike 83 golf tournament

== Career statistics ==
=== Regular season and playoffs ===
			Regular season									Playoffs
Season	Team	League	GP	W	L	T	MIN	GA	SO	GAA	SV%	GP	W	L	MIN	GA	SO	GAA	SV%
1987–88	Toronto Red Wings	MetJHL	40	—	—	—	—	—	5	2.33	—	—	—	—	—	—	—	—	—
1987–88	Henry Carr Crusaders	MetJHL	1	0	0	0	2	1	0	30.00	—	—	—	—	—	—	—	—	—
1988–89	Kitchener Rangers	OHL	30	14	9	4	1672	112	0	4.02	—	2	0	2	126	8	0	3.81	—
1989–90	Kitchener Rangers	OHL	40	25	11	2	2280	136	1	3.58	.875	17	11	6	1023	60	0	3.52	—
1989–90	Kitchener Rangers	M-Cup	—	—	—	—	—	—	—	—	—	5	3	2	354	23	0	3.90	—
1990–91	Kitchener Rangers	OHL	57	25	24	7	3317	219	0	3.96	.891	6	2	4	382	30	0	4.71	—
1991–92	Kitchener Rangers	OHL	55	25	24	3	3042	203	1	4.00	.881	14	7	7	900	47	0	3.13	—
1992–93	Kalamazoo Wings	IHL	48	19	17	9	2729	173	0	3.80	.892	—	—	—	—	—	—	—	—
1992–93	Canadian National Team	Intl	5	5	0	0	354	11	1	2.20	—	—	—	—	—	—	—	—	—
1993–94	Kalamazoo Wings	IHL	43	23	12	2	2168	133	0	3.68	.889	4	1	3	221	14	1	3.80	.904
1994–95	Dallas Stars	NHL	6	3	2	1	327	18	0	3.30	.895	—	—	—	—	—	—	—	—
1994–95	Kalamazoo Wings	IHL	41	19	14	5	2140	106	3	2.97	.904	6	0	4	257	17	0	3.97	.851
1995–96	Portland Pirates	AHL	12	2	6	2	577	46	0	4.79	.855	—	—	—	—	—	—	—	—
1995–96	Hampton Roads Admirals	ECHL	5	2	2	0	260	17	0	3.92	.904	—	—	—	—	—	—	—	—
1995–96	Michigan K-Wings	IHL	1	1	0	0	60	1	0	1.00	.966	—	—	—	—	—	—	—	—
1995–96	Orlando Solar Bears	IHL	7	3	1	1	341	17	0	2.99	.909	—	—	—	—	—	—	—	—
1995–96	Baltimore Bandits	AHL	5	2	1	1	256	18	0	4.21	.902	1	0	0	40	0	0	0.00	1.000
1996–97	Fort Wayne Komets	IHL	57	20	31	3	2970	172	1	3.47	.893	—	—	—	—	—	—	—	—
1996–97	Baltimore Bandits	AHL	—	—	—	—	—	—	—	—	—	1	0	0	40	6	0	6.00	.871
1997–98	Milwaukee Admirals	IHL	34	13	14	1	1828	94	1	3.09	.886	—	—	—	—	—	—	—	—
1997–98	San Antonio Dragons	IHL	2	0	2	0	118	12	0	6.07	.833	—	—	—	—	—	—	—	—
1997–98	Peoria Rivermen	ECHL	5	4	1	0	299	16	0	3.21	.889	1	0	0	60	7	0	7.00	—
1998–99	HC Asiago AS	ALP	30	—	—	—	1800	131	0	4.39	—	—	—	—	—	—	—	—	—
1998–99	HC Asiago AS	ITA	13	—	—	—	776	53	0	4.10	—	—	—	—	—	—	—	—	—
1999–00	Mohawk Valley Prowlers	UHL	23	8	9	4	1248	80	0	3.85	.883	—	—	—	—	—	—	—	—
1999–00	Birmingham Bulls	ECHL	14	4	10	0	705	52	0	4.43	.866	—	—	—	—	—	—	—	—
2000–01	Sheffield Steelers	ISL	23	—	—	—	1310	45	0	2.06	.917	1	—	—	—	—	—	5.00	.815
2001–02	Manchester Storm	ISL	23	—	—	—	1211	57	0	2.82	.916	5	—	—	—	—	—	3.15	—
2002–03	Manchester Storm	ISL	3	—	—	—	180	6	0	2.00	.865	—	—	—	—	—	—	—	—
2002–03	Guildford Flames	BNL	36	—	—	—	1972	109	0	3.32	.881	8	—	—	—	—	—	2.88	.902
2003–04	Cambridge Hornets	MLH	9	5	4	0	570	38	0	4.00	—	—	—	—	—	—	—	—	—
2004–05	Cambridge Hornets	MLH	11	6	2	1	611	45	0	4.42	—	—	—	—	—	—	—	—	—
2005–06	Cambridge Hornets	MLH	8	3	5	0	379	35	0	5.54	—	—	—	—	—	—	—	—	—
NHL totals			6	3	2	1	327	18	0	3.30	.895	—	—	—	—	—	—	—	—
