= CHL Scholastic Player of the Year =

Annual award to a Canadian Hockey League player

CHL Scholastic Player of the Year Award
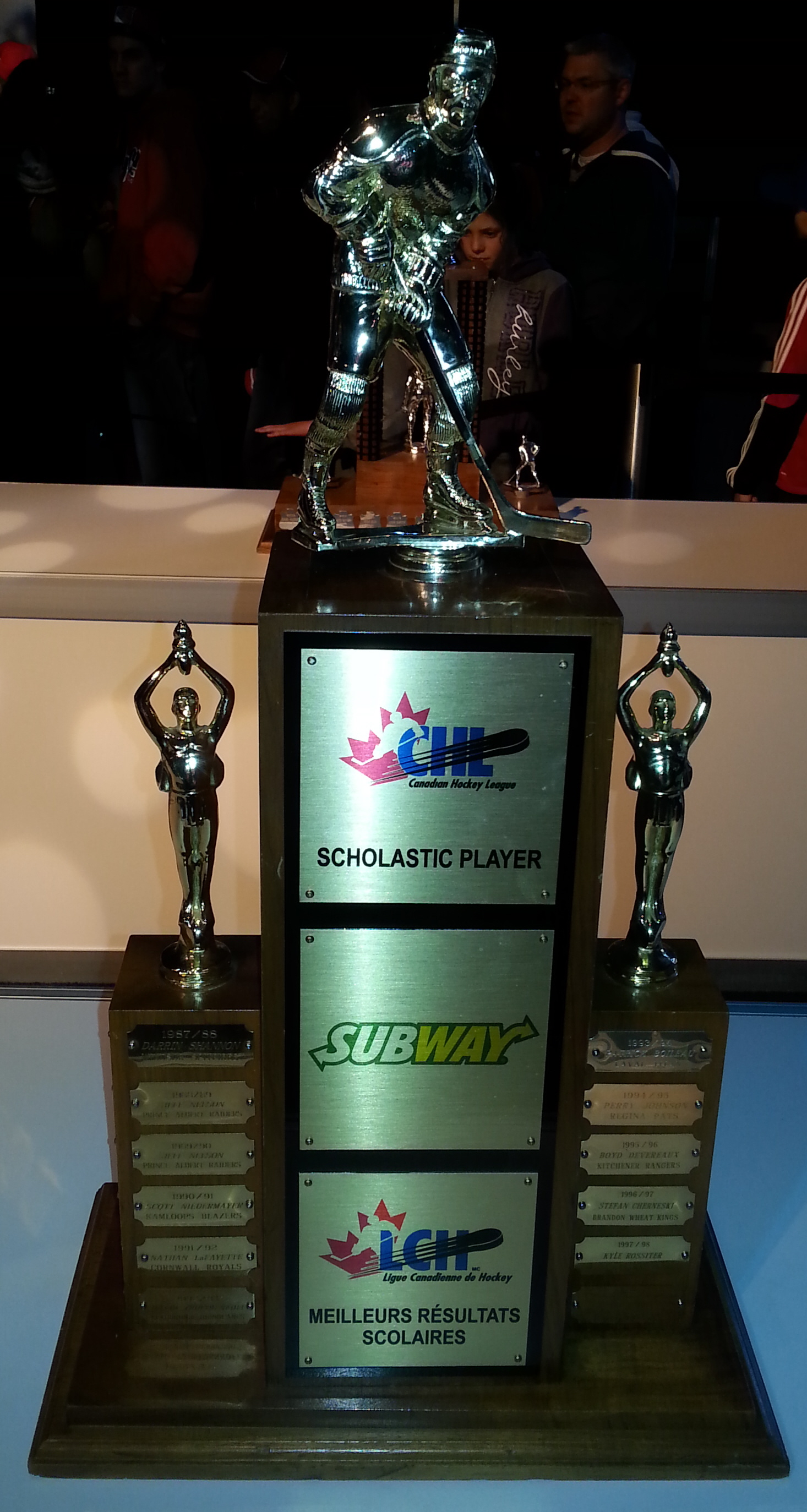
- Sport: Ice hockey
- Awarded for: Annually to the Canadian Hockey League player who is best combines success on the ice with success in school.

History
- First award: 1988
- First winner: Darrin Shannon
- Most wins: Jeff Nelson; Connor McDavid (2)
- Most recent: Alex Weiermair

The CHL Scholastic Player of the Year Award is awarded annually to the Canadian Hockey League player who is best combines success on the ice with success in school. It is chosen from the winners of the constituent league awards; the Daryl K. (Doc) Seaman Trophy of the Western Hockey League, the Marcel Robert Trophy of the Quebec Maritimes Junior Hockey League, or the Bobby Smith Trophy of the Ontario Hockey League.

== Winners ==
List of winners of the CHL Scholastic Player of the Year Award.

Season	Winner	Team	League
1987–88	Darrin Shannon	Windsor Spitfires	OHL
1988–89	Jeff Nelson	Prince Albert Raiders	WHL
1989–90	Jeff Nelson	Prince Albert Raiders	WHL
1990–91	Scott Niedermayer	Kamloops Blazers	WHL
1991–92	Nathan LaFayette	Cornwall Royals	OHL
1992–93	David Trofimenkoff	Lethbridge Hurricanes	WHL
1993–94	Patrick Boileau	Laval Titan Collège Français	QMJHL
1994–95	Perry Johnson	Regina Pats	WHL
1995-96	Boyd Devereaux	Kitchener Rangers	OHL
1996–97	Stefan Cherneski	Brandon Wheat Kings	WHL
1997–98	Kyle Rossiter	Spokane Chiefs	WHL
1998–99	Rob Zepp	Plymouth Whalers	OHL
1999–2000	Brad Boyes	Erie Otters	OHL
2000–01	Dan Hulak	Portland Winter Hawks	WHL
2001-02	Olivier Michaud	Shawinigan Cataractes	QMJHL
2002–03	Dustin Brown	Guelph Storm	OHL
2003–04	Devan Dubnyk	Kamloops Blazers	WHL
2004–05	Gilbert Brule	Vancouver Giants	WHL
2005–06	Pierre-Marc Guilbault	Shawinigan Cataractes	QMJHL
2006–07	Alexandre Picard-Hooper	Baie-Comeau Drakkar	QMJHL
2007–08	Robert Slaney	Cape Breton Screaming Eagles	QMJHL
2008–09	Stefan Elliott	Saskatoon Blades	WHL
2009–10	Dominic Jalbert	Chicoutimi Saguenéens	QMJHL
2010–11	Dougie Hamilton	Niagara IceDogs	OHL
2011–12	Jonathan Brunelle	Cape Breton Screaming Eagles	QMJHL
2012–13	Josh Morrissey	Prince Albert Raiders	WHL
2013–14	Connor McDavid	Erie Otters	OHL
2014–15	Connor McDavid	Erie Otters	OHL
2015–16	Alexis D'Aoust	Shawinigan Cataractes	QMJHL
2016–17	Sasha Chmelevski	Ottawa 67's	OHL
2017–18	Alexandre Alain	Blainville-Boisbriand Armada	QMJHL
2018–19	Dustin Wolf	Everett Silvertips	WHL
2019–20	Cole Perfetti	Saginaw Spirit	OHL
2020–21	Not awarded due to COVID-19 pandemic		
2021–22	Owen Beck	Mississauga Steelheads	OHL
2022–23	Colby Barlow	Owen Sound Attack	OHL
2023–24	Noah Chadwick	Lethbridge Hurricanes	WHL
2024–25	Mathieu Cataford	Rimouski Océanic	QMJHL
2025–26	Alex Weiermair	Portland Winterhawks	WHL

== See also ==
- List of Canadian Hockey League awards
