= Kayle Short =

Canadian ice hockey player

- Born: May 16, 1973 (age 52) Barrie, Ontario, Canada
- Position: Defence
- Shoots: Left
- Played for: Guelph Storm; Hamilton Dukes; Sudbury Wolves; Portland Pirates
- National team: Canada
- NHL draft: Undrafted

Kayle Short (born May 16, 1973) is a Canadian former professional ice hockey defenceman who played professionally in the North American minor leagues and in Europe.

Short played junior hockey with the Dukes of Hamilton, Sudbury Wolves and Guelph Storm. Short attended the University of New Brunswick and played for the Canadian National Team. He was with the Portland Pirates of the American Hockey League (AHL) and Hampton Roads Admirals of the ECHL from 1996 to 1998, the Sheffield Steelers and the Manchester Storm of the Ice Hockey Superleague from 1998 to 2002, the Fresno Falcons of the West Coast Hockey League in 2002–03, and the Las Vegas Wranglers and Peoria Rivermen of the ECHL in 2003–04.

== Career statistics ==
| | | | Regular season | | | | | Playoffs |
| Season | Team | League | GP | G | A | Pts | PIM | GP | G | A | Pts | PIM |
|---|---|---|---|---|---|---|---|---|---|---|---|---|
| 1990-91 | Hamilton Dukes | OHL | 56 | 7 | 15 | 22 | 48 | 4 | 1 | 0 | 1 | 2 |
| 1991-92 | Guelph Storm | OHL | 39 | 4 | 19 | 23 | 81 | — | — | — | — | — |
| 1991-92 | Sudbury Wolves | OHL | 25 | 0 | 3 | 3 | 38 | 8 | 0 | 2 | 2 | 23 |
| 1992-93 | Sudbury Wolves | OHL | 50 | 2 | 11 | 13 | 89 | 14 | 0 | 0 | 0 | 26 |
| 1993-94 | Sudbury Wolves | OHL | 5 | 0 | 2 | 2 | 15 | — | — | — | — | — |
| 1993-94 | Guelph Storm | OHL | 44 | 5 | 24 | 29 | 62 | 4 | 0 | 0 | 0 | 4 |
| 1995-96 | U. of New Brunswick | AUAA | 26 | 2 | 19 | 21 | 70 |
| 1996-97 | Canadian National Team | Intl | 59 | 7 | 6 | 13 | 91 |
| 1996-97 | Portland Pirates | AHL | 1 | 0 | 1 | 1 | 0 | — | — | — | — | — |
| 1997-98 | Hampton Roads Admirals | ECHL | 40 | 1 | 10 | 11 | 86 | 13 | 1 | 0 | 1 | 18 |
| 1997-98 | Portland Pirates | AHL | 25 | 1 | 2 | 3 | 27 | -- | -- | -- | -- | -- |
| 1998-99 | Sheffield Steelers | BISL | 38 | 5 | 7 | 12 | 40 |
| 1999-00 | Sheffield Steelers | BISL | 42 | 3 | 10 | 13 | 46 | 6 | 0 | 2 | 2 | 10 |
| 2000-01 | Sheffield Steelers | BISL | 46 | 5 | 12 | 17 | 74 | 8 | 0 | 2 | 2 | 6 |
| 2001-02 | Manchester Storm | BISL | 48 | 4 | 12 | 16 | 62 | 8 | 1 | 2 | 3 | 8 |
| 2002-03 | Fresno Falcons | WCHL | 63 | 2 | 13 | 15 | 110 | 13 | 1 | 2 | 3 | 20 |
| 2003-04 | Las Vegas Wranglers | ECHL | 17 | 0 | 5 | 5 | 18 | — | — | — | — | — |
| 2003-04 | Peoria Rivermen | ECHL | 1 | 0 | 0 | 0 | 0 | 8 | 0 | 1 | 1 | 4 |
| AHL totals | | | 26 | 1 | 3 | 4 | 27 | — | — | — | — | — |
