= Duane Dennis =

Canadian ice hockey player

- Born: February 6, 1969 (age 57) Vernon, British Columbia, Canada
- Height: 6 ft 0 in (183 cm)
- Weight: 187 lb (85 kg; 13 st 5 lb)
- Position: Left wing
- Shot: Left
- NHL draft: Undrafted
- Playing career: 1994–2003

Duane Dennis (born February 6, 1969) is a Canadian former professional ice hockey player.

Dennis attended the Acadia University where he played with the Acadia Axemen men's ice hockey team. For his outstanding play during the 1993–94 season, Dennis was named the CIS Player of the year and was awarded the Senator Joseph A. Sullivan Trophy.

== Career statistics ==
| | | | Regular season | | | | | Playoffs |
| Season | Team | League | GP | G | A | Pts | PIM | GP | G | A | Pts | PIM |
|---|---|---|---|---|---|---|---|---|---|---|---|---|
| 1987–88 | Vernon Lakers | BCJHL | 43 | 14 | 26 | 40 | 140 | — | — | — | — | — |
| 1988–89 | Vernon Lakers | BCJHL | 57 | 43 | 59 | 102 | 132 | — | — | — | — | — |
| 1989–90 | Vernon Lakers | BCJHL | 48 | 32 | 49 | 81 | 85 | — | — | — | — | — |
| 1990–91 | Acadia University | CIAU | 26 | 16 | 22 | 38 | 50 | — | — | — | — | — |
| 1991–92 | Acadia University | CIAU | 24 | 14 | 17 | 31 | 50 | 7 | 8 | 2 | 10 | — |
| 1992–93 | Acadia University | CIAU | 26 | 20 | 20 | 40 | 72 | 7 | 6 | 7 | 13 | 16 |
| 1993–94 | Acadia University | CIAU | 26 | 35 | 39 | 74 | 68 | — | — | — | — | — |
| 1993–94 | Prince Edward Island Senators | AHL | 2 | 0 | 0 | 0 | 0 | — | — | — | — | — |
| 1994–95 | Wheeling Thunderbirds | ECHL | 17 | 10 | 12 | 22 | 25 | 3 | 0 | 0 | 0 | 8 |
| 1994–95 | Cape Breton Oilers | AHL | 28 | 2 | 4 | 6 | 16 | — | — | — | — | — |
| 1995–96 | EHC Neuwied | Germany2 | 40 | 26 | 39 | 65 | 109 | — | — | — | — | — |
| 1996–97 | HC Thurgau | NLB | 24 | 19 | 19 | 38 | 52 | 5 | 1 | 5 | 6 | 31 |
| 1997–98 | Kaufbeurer Adler | DEL | 9 | 1 | 0 | 1 | 6 | — | — | — | — | — |
| 1998–99 | SC Riessersee | Germany2 | 52 | 22 | 34 | 56 | 126 | 3 | 0 | 2 | 2 | 6 |
| 1999–00 | SC Riessersee | Germany2 | 50 | 26 | 37 | 63 | 100 | — | — | — | — | — |
| 2000–01 | SC Riessersee | Germany2 | 43 | 22 | 27 | 49 | 109 | 5 | 4 | 3 | 7 | 10 |
| 2001–02 | SC Riessersee | Germany2 | 33 | 19 | 17 | 36 | 66 | — | — | — | — | — |
| 2002–03 | ERC Selb | Germany3 | 20 | 14 | 22 | 36 | 8 | — | — | — | — | — |
| AHL totals | | | 30 | 2 | 4 | 6 | 16 | — | — | — | — | — |
| Germany2 totals | | | 218 | 115 | 154 | 269 | 510 | 8 | 4 | 5 | 9 | 16 |

== Awards and honours ==
| Award | Year |
|---|---|
| Senator Joseph A. Sullivan Trophy - CIS Player of the Year | 1993–94 |
