= Jean-Paul Davis =

Canadian ice hockey player

- Born: February 10, 1972 (age 54) Oshawa, Ontario, Canada
- Height: 6 ft 0 in (183 cm)
- Weight: 187 lb (85 kg; 13 st 5 lb)
- Position: Defence
- Shot: Left
- NHL draft: Undrafted
- Playing career: 1997–2001

Jean-Paul Davis (born February 10, 1972) is a Canadian former professional ice hockey defenceman.

== Career ==
Davis attended the University of Guelph, where he played with the Guelph Gryphons men's ice hockey team. For his outstanding play during the 1997–98 season, Davis was named the CIS Player of the year and was awarded the Senator Joseph A. Sullivan Trophy.

== Present day life ==
Davis resides in Sarnia, Canada where he practices full scope oral and maxillofacial surgery.

== Awards and honours ==
Award	Year
Senator Joseph A. Sullivan Trophy - CIS Player of the Year	1997–98
