= Rick Cornacchia =

Italian-born Canadian ice hockey coach

- Born: February 6, 1951 (age 74)
- Position: Forward
- Played for: HC Alleghe (Italy)
- NHL draft: Undrafted
- Playing career: 1975–1976

Rick Cornacchia (born February 6, 1951) is an Italian-born Canadian ice hockey coach and notably, was the head coach of the Italy men's national ice hockey team at the 2010 IIHF World Championship.

He is the general manager of the National Training Rinks (NTR) in Richmond Hill, Ontario.
