= Dukes of Hamilton (ice hockey) =

Canadian junior ice hockey team (1989–1991)

- City: Hamilton, Ontario
- League: Ontario Hockey League
- Operated: 1989–1991
- Home arena: Copps Coliseum; Mountain Arena
- Colours: Red, white and blue

Franchise history
- 1904–1989: Toronto Marlboros
- 1989–1991: Dukes of Hamilton
- 1991–present: Guelph Storm

The Dukes of Hamilton, also known as the Hamilton Dukes, were a junior ice hockey team that represented Hamilton, Ontario, Canada, in the Ontario Hockey League for two seasons from 1989 to 1991.

== History ==
In October 1988, with the Toronto Marlboros losing hundreds of thousands of dollars a year, Maple Leaf Gardens Limited sold the team for a reported $500,000 to a group from Hamilton. The team moved to Hamilton for the 1989–90 OHL season, becoming the Dukes of Hamilton. The name "Dukes" originated as a nickname for the Toronto team coming from its namesake, the Duke of Marlborough.

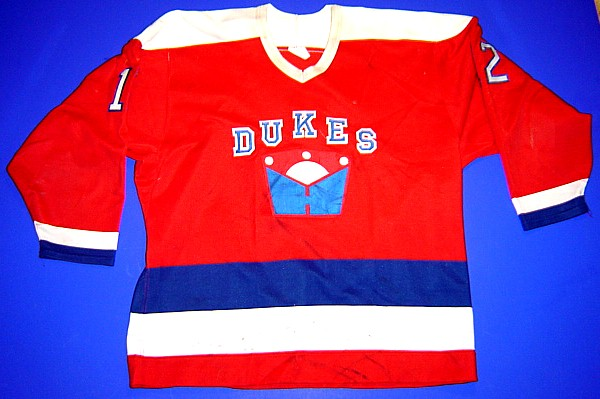
Hamilton Dukes road jersey

The Dukes' colours were red, white and blue, and the logo was a crown. The Dukes played their home games at Copps Coliseum.

The Dukes were chosen to host the 1990 Memorial Cup their first season in Hamilton. When they finished last in the 1989–90 OHL season standings, the Dukes withdrew from the Memorial Cup, and the OHL sent the league finalist Kitchener Rangers instead.

During the 1990–91 OHL season, occasional home games were played at the Mountain Arena when the team's attendance dropped significantly. The Dukes switched from the Leyden Division to the Emms Division, where they placed eighth, and lost in four consecutive games to the Sault Ste. Marie Greyhounds in the first round of the playoffs. The team struggled with attendance, drawing a league-lowest average approximately 1,200 fans per game. The team was sold in March 1991, and relocated for the 1990–91 season becoming the Guelph Storm.

== Players ==
Three Dukes alumni went on to play brief NHL careers. Alek Stojanov played 107 games, Chris Govedaris played 45 games, and Shawn McCosh played 9 games. Also of note are Jeff Bes (captain), Dino Felicetti, Rob Leask and Kayle Short for their careers in other professional leagues.

Bill Armstrong started the 1989–90 season playing defence for the Dukes, but two mid-season trades later he played for the Oshawa Generals and scored the winning goal in double overtime of the 1990 Memorial Cup in Hamilton.

== Season-by-season results ==
List of season-by-season results:

Season	Games	Won	Lost	Tied	Points	Pct %	GF	GA	Standing	Playoffs
1989–90	66	11	49	6	28	0.212	211	371	7th Leyden	Did not qualify
1990–91	66	17	43	6	40	0.303	270	379	6th Emms	Lost 4–0 in first round to Sault Ste. Marie Greyhounds
