= List of Coventry Blaze players =

Below is a list of all the players to have played for the Coventry Blaze from 2000 to the present day.

Name	Nationality	Pos	Seasons	Games played	2012-13 club	Notes
Neil Adams	UK	F	1997-01	108	(United Kingdom) Solihull Barons (NIHL)	
Chris Allen	Canada	D	2009-10	10	(United Kingdom) Solihull Barons (NIHL)	
James Archer	UK	F (RW)	2006-08	45	(United Kingdom) Manchester Phoenix (EPIHL)	
Frantisek Bakrlik	Czech Republic	F (RW)	2011-12	14	(United Kingdom) Slough Jets (EPIHL)	
Adam Brittle	UK	F	2004-05	7	(United Kingdom) Milton Keynes Lightning (EPIHL)	
Luke Brittle	UK	F	2011-12	6	(United Kingdom) Telford Tigers (EPIHL)	
Josh Bruce	UK	F	2007-10	13	(United Kingdom) Slough Jets (EPIHL)	
Rikki Bryniarski	UK	F (RW)	2009-10	3	(United Kingdom) Coventry Blaze NIHL (NIHL)	
Adam Calder	Canada	F (LW)	2004-10	384	(United Kingdom) Milton Keynes Lightning (EPIHL)	
Dustin Cameron	Canada	F (LW)	2012	0	(United Kingdom) Coventry Blaze (EIHL)	
Derek Campbell	Canada	F (RW)	2009-10	67	(Canada) Sheffield Steeldogs (EPIHL)	
Tom Carlon	Canada	F (LW)	2004-10	384	(United Kingdom) Milton Keynes Lightning (EPIHL)	
Greg Chambers	Canada	F (RW)	2009-11	139	(United Kingdom) Basingstoke Bison (EPIHL)	
Evan Cheverie	Canada	F	2005-06	75	(France) Pingouins de Morzine-Avoriaz (Ligue Magnus)	
David Clarke	UK	F	2001-02	2	(United Kingdom) Nottingham Panthers (EIHL)	
Sylvain Cloutier	Canada	F (C)	2006-08	139	(United Kingdom) Hull Stingrays - player coach (EIHL)	
Jon Coleman	USA	D	2008-09	13	(Italy) HC Appiano (IHL - Serie A)	
Nick Compton	UK	D	2009-10	2	(United Kingdom) Wightlink Raiders (ENIHL)	
Russell Cowley	UK	F	2001-12	623	(United Kingdom) Coventry Blaze (EIHL)	
Brad Cruikshank	Canada	F	2010-11	77	(Canada) Lloydminster Border Kings (ChHL)	
Mike Danton	Canada	F (C)	2012	0	(United Kingdom) Coventry Blaze (EIHL)	
Sylvain Deschatelets	Canada	F (C)	2008-09	73	(Canada) Saguenay Marquis (LNAH)	
Jerramie Domish	USA	D	2011-12	57	(United Kingdom) Coventry Blaze (EIHL)	
Mike Egener	Canada	D	2012	2	(United Kingdom) Coventry Blaze (EIHL)	
Rob Eley	UK	F	1997-2002	257	(United Kingdom) Solihull Barons (NIHL)	
