= Oxford Blades =

Former English ice hockey team

The Oxford Blades were an English ice hockey team based in Oxford, Oxfordshire. They competed in the English Premier Ice Hockey League during the 1998–1999 season and folded halfway through the 1999–2000 season.

The Blades were formed after a year without senior men's hockey in the town. Following the dissolution of the Oxford City Stars, Mike Kellond created the Oxford Chill. Due to the failure of the ice plant at Oxford, Kellond moved the team to Swindon where they became known as the Swindon Chill.

Following a move back to the university-town, the club's concessions from the council for the ice costs were lost along with the majority of its players.

A group of ice hockey-loving businessmen created the Oxford Blades, bringing in former Stars' coach Sid Cabby as managing director in January 1999. Due to a sponsorship deal, the club was known during their debut season as The City Motors FOX Blades. The club's only full season saw them have four head coaches: Geoff Copping got things underway and Erskine Douglas provided a solid structure and programme for a few weeks before leaving for Chelmsford Chieftains. He was replaced by Daryl Morvan and then by late signing Mark Budz. The club lost every game during 1998–1999 and finished at the bottom of the league. However, the club won the sportsmanship trophy for finishing at the top of the fair play league with a total of 386 penalty minutes during the course of the league season.

The 1999–2000 season would prove to be their last, as the club ran out of money and played their last game on 23 January 2000, which saw them lose 16–3 at home to the Isle of Wight Raiders. All league statistics from the season were expunged.

== Results ==
=== 1998–1999 season ===
Date	Opponent	Venue	Result	Competition
N/A	Blackburn Hawks	Away	Lost 13–2	English Cup
N/A	Blackburn Hawks	Home	Lost 6–2	English Cup
N/A	Solihull Blaze	Home	Lost 20–2	English Cup
N/A	Solihull Blaze	Away	Lost 15–1	English Cup
N/A	Swindon Chill	Home	Lost 9–1	English Cup
N/A	Swindon Chill	Away	Lost 14–4	English Cup
N/A	Wightlink Raiders	Home	Lost 14–4	English Cup
N/A	Wightlink Raiders	Away	Lost 11–2	English Cup
Saturday 10 October 1998	Chelmsford Chieftains	Away	Lost 14–2	English League
Saturday 17 October 1998	Swindon Chill	Away	Lost 9–2	English League
Sunday 18 October 1998	Swindon Chill	Home	Lost 9–2	English League
Saturday 24 October 1998	Wightlink Raiders	Away	Lost 17–4	English League
Sunday 25 October 1998	Solihull Blaze	Away	Lost 18–2	English League
Saturday 31 October 1998	Romford Raiders	Away	Lost 13–2	English League
Sunday 1 November 1998	Wightlink Raiders	Home	Lost 13–3	English League
Thursday 5 November 1998	Chelmsford Chieftains	Away	Lost 12–2	English League
Saturday 7 November 1998	Milton Keynes Kings	Away	Lost 20–1	English League
Sunday 22 November 1998	Invicta Dynamos	Home	Lost 8–0	English League
Sunday 29 November 1998	Swindon Chill	Away	Lost 8–2	English League
Saturday 5 December 1998	Wightlink Raiders	Away	Lost 15–5	English League
Sunday 6 December 1998	Blackburn Hawks	Home	Lost 11–3	English League
Sunday 13 December 1998	Chelmsford Chieftains	Home	Lost 7–2	English League
Sunday 20 December 1998	Blackburn Hawks	Away	Lost 19–2	English League
Sunday 3 January 1999	Romford Raiders	Home	Lost 15–2	English League
Saturday 9 January 1999	Invicta Dynamos	Away	Lost 9–6	English League
Sunday 10 January 1999	Milton Keynes Kings	Home	Lost 8–4	English League
Saturday 16 January 1999	Solihull Blaze	Home	Lost 20–7	English League
Sunday 17 January 1999	Blackburn Hawks	Home	Lost 9–5	English League
Thursday 21 January 1999	Milton Keynes Kings	Away	Lost 21–1	English League
Sunday 24 January 1999	Solihull Blaze	Home	Lost 15–1	English League
Sunday 31 January 1999	Wightlink Raiders	Home	Lost 14–7	English League
Saturday 6 February 1999	Romford Raiders	Away	Lost 11–3	English League
Sunday 7 February 1999	Romford Raiders	Home	Lost 7–6	English League
Sunday 14 February 1999	Chelmsford Chieftains	Home	Lost 14–5	English League
Saturday 20 February 1999	Blackburn Hawks	Away	Lost 19–2	English League
Sunday 21 February 1999	Invicta Dynamos	Away	Lost 14–2	English League
Sunday 28 February 1999	Milton Keynes Kings	Home	Lost 11–3	English League
Saturday 6 March 1999	Solihull Blaze	Away	Lost 14–5	English League
Sunday 7 March 1999	Swindon Chill	Home	Lost 7–4	English League
Sunday 21 March 1999	Invicta Dynamos	Home	Lost 12–1	English League

=== 1999–2000 season ===
Date	Opponent	Venue	Result	Competition
Saturday 4 September 1999	Chelmsford Chieftains	Away	Lost 6–2	English League
Sunday 5 September 1999	Swindon Chill	Away	Won 7–6	English League
Saturday 11 September 1999	Cardiff Rage	Away	Tied 7–7	English League
Sunday 12 September 1999	Romford Raiders	Home	Lost 8–3	English League
Saturday 18 September 1999	Swindon Chill	Away	Lost 8–2	English League
Sunday 19 September 1999	Isle of Wight Raiders	Home	Lost 9–3	English League
Saturday 25 September 1999	Romford Raiders	Home	Won 5–3	English League
Sunday 26 September 1999	Invicta Dynamos	Away	Lost 7–4	English League
Sunday 10 October 1999	Cardiff Rage	Home	Won 9–3	English League
Saturday 16 October 1999	Romford Raiders	Away	Lost 9–6	English League
Sunday 17 October 1999	Isle of Wight Raiders	Home	Lost 4–3	English League
Sunday 24 October 1999	Invicta Dynamos	Home	Won 6–5	English League
Saturday 30 October 1999	Chelmsford Chieftains	Away	Lost 13–3	English League
Sunday 14 November 1999	Invicta Dynamos	Home	Tied 5–5	English League
Sunday 28 November 1999	Chelmsford Chieftains	Away	Lost 12–3	English League
Saturday 4 December 1999	Isle of Wight Raiders	Away	Lost 21–4	English League
Saturday 11 December 1999	Swindon Chill	Away	Lost 11–2	English League
Sunday 2 January 2000	Romford Raiders	Away	Lost 8–4	English League
Saturday 8 January 2000	Isle of Wight Raiders	Away	Lost 14–6	English League
Sunday 9 January 2000	Chelmsford Chieftains	Home	Lost 7–1	English League
Sunday 23 January 2000	Isle of Wight Raiders	Home	Lost 16–3	English League
