= Nick Poole =

Canadian ice hockey player

- Born: July 11, 1973 (age 52) Calgary, Alberta, Canada
- Height: 6 ft 0 in (183 cm)
- Weight: 188 lb (85 kg; 13 st 6 lb)
- Position: Forward
- Shot: Right
- EPL team Former teams: Milton Keynes Lightning; Manchester Phoenix; Dayton Bombers; Manchester Phoenix; London Knights; Milton Keynes Kings
- Playing career: 1991–2014

Nick Poole (born July 11, 1973) is a Canadian former professional ice hockey player. He was most recently the general manager for Milton Keynes Lightning in the English Premier Ice Hockey League. Previously Poole was a player and head coach for Lightning, an ice hockey team based in England.

Poole played college hockey in the United States, at the University of New Hampshire. After college, he turned professional with the Dayton Bombers of the East Coast Hockey League. Poole moved to Europe where he established himself further. He has since won numerous league and playoff titles with Milton Keynes Lightning. He is the team's longest serving player, having joined the team when it was first established in 2002 and is also the most successful player/coach the team has had. As a player, he wears the number 91 jersey, the year he started his career in ice hockey.

Poole left MK Lightning on the 26th November 2016 and his number 91 jersey was retired.

Poole also worked at Oxley Park Academy as a physical education teacher.

== Career statistics ==
			Regular season					Playoffs
Season	Team	League	GP	G	A	Pts	PIM	GP	G	A	Pts	PIM
1991–1992	U. of New Hampshire	H-East	23	2	5	7	—	—	—	—	—	—
1992–1993	U. of New Hampshire	H-East	38	15	26	41	0	—	—	—	—	—
1993–1994	U. of New Hampshire	H-East	35	10	28	38	22	—	—	—	—	—
1994–1995	U. of New Hampshire	H-East	36	6	26	34	10	—	—	—	—	—
1995–96	Dayton Bombers	ECHL	64	14	40	54	62	2	2	—	2	—
1995–1996	Michigan K-Wings	IHL	1	0	2	2	1	—	—	—	—	—
1996–1997	Manchester Storm	BISL	41	15	18	34	26	6	1	1	2	—
1997–1998	Pelicans Lahti	FinD1	38	6	17	23	26	8	1	5	6	—
1998–1999	London Knights	BISL	42	7	16	23	22	6	1	4	5	—
1999–2000	Milton Keynes Kings	BNL	36	18	28	46	53	—	—	—	—	—
2000–2001	Milton Keynes Kings	BNL	26	14	22	36	22	6	2	2	3	—
2001–2002	Peterborough Pirates	BNL	33	21	34	55	24	—	—	—	—	—
2001–2002	Fife Flyers	BNL	2	0	2	2	2	8	2	4	6	—
2002–2003	Milton Keynes Lightning	EPIHL	41	35	92	127	24	8	4	12	16	—
2003–2004	Milton Keynes Lightning	EPIHL	10	5	11	16	—	—	—	—	—	—
2003–2004	Manchester Phoenix	EIHL	3	0	1	1	4	—	—	—	—	—
2004–2005	Milton Keynes Lightning	EPIHL	23	19	42	61	26	—	—	—	—	—
2005–2006	Milton Keynes Lightning	EPIHL	42	18	40	58	32	8	1	5	6	—
2006–2007	Milton Keynes Lightning	EPIHL	34	19	41	60	48	6	3	4	7	—
2007–2008	Milton Keynes Lightning	EPIHL	33	7	25	32	28	6	2	3	5	—
2008–2009	Milton Keynes Lightning	EPIHL	52	18	49	67	40	—	—	—	—	—
2009–2010	Milton Keynes Lightning	EPIHL	52	16	33	49	48	—	—	—	—	—
2010–2011	Milton Keynes Lightning	EPIHL	38	5	23	28	24	—	—	—	—	—
2011–2012	Milton Keynes Lightning	EPIHL	34	8	26	34	20	—	—	—	—	—
2012–2013	Milton Keynes Lightning	EPIHL	8	2	4	6	14	—	—	—	—	—

== Honours ==
EPIHL League Champion: 2003/2004, 2004/2005, 2009/2010

EPIHL Playoff Winner: 2002/2003, 2003/2004, 2004/2005, 2005/2006

EPIHL Playoff Runner-Up: 2008/2009, 2010/2011

EPIHL Cup Runner-Up: 2006/2007, 2007/2008
