= Kantee =

Kantee is a Finnish surname. Notable people with the surname include:

- Kevin Kantee (born 1984), Finnish ice hockey player
- Lauri Kantee, Finnish civil servant and land surveyor
- Ville Kantee (born 1978), Finnish ski jumper
