= Tim Wallace =

American ice hockey player

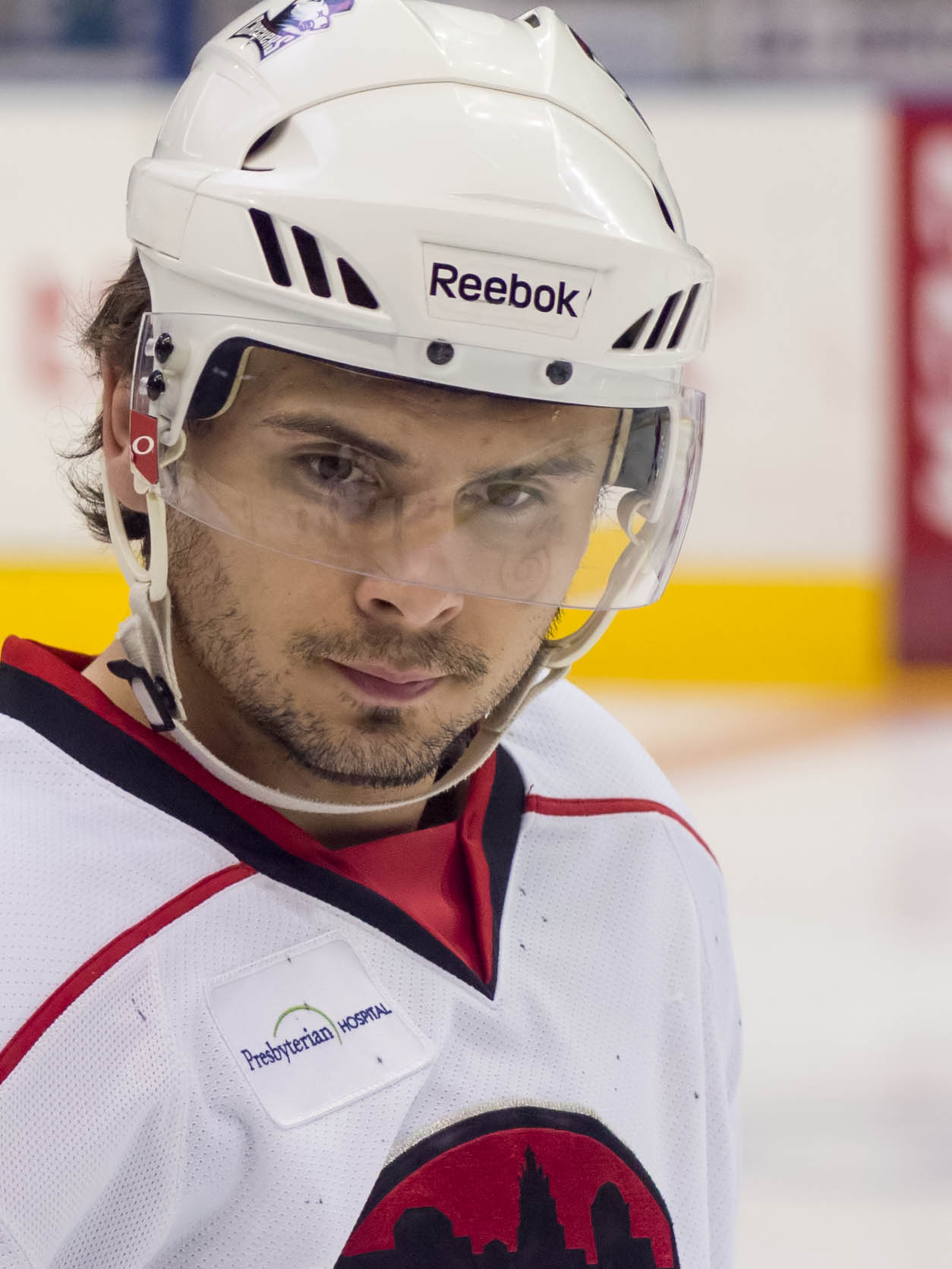
- Wallace with the Charlotte Checkers in 2013
- Born: August 6, 1984 (age 41) Anchorage, Alaska, U.S.
- Height: 6 ft 1 in (185 cm)
- Weight: 207 lb (94 kg; 14 st 11 lb)
- Position: Center/Right Wing
- Shot: Right
- Played for: Pittsburgh Penguins; New York Islanders; Tampa Bay Lightning; Carolina Hurricanes; Örebro HK; Brynäs IF; Grizzlys Wolfsburg; Sheffield Steelers; Milton Keynes Lightning
- NHL draft: Undrafted
- Playing career: 2006–2024

Timothy Todd Wallace (born August 6, 1984) is an American professional ice hockey center and ice hockey coach, who is currently the head coach and general manager of Elite Ice Hockey League (EIHL) side Fife Flyers.

Before that, he was most recently the head coach of Milton Keynes Lightning in the National Ice Hockey League (NIHL).

Between May 2019 and January 2022, Wallace was head coach of UK EIHL side Nottingham Panthers. Wallace also previously served as joint Player/Coach between 2018 and 2019 for fellow English club Milton Keynes Lightning, alongside Ryan Lannon.

Before starting his professional career, Wallace played four seasons with the University of Notre Dame of the CCHA. A product of the U.S. National Team Developmental Program, he was a member of gold-medal teams at both the 2002 Under-18 World Championships and the Under-17 World Challenge in 2001.

== Playing career ==
As a youth, Wallace played in the 1998 Quebec International Pee-Wee Hockey Tournament with a minor ice hockey team from Alaska.

=== College ===
Wallace played four collegiate seasons (2002–2006) at the University of Notre Dame, where he set a school record by playing in all 153 games during his career. He scored 25 goals with 34 assists for 59 points and had 39 penalties for 86 minutes. As a senior, he notched 11 goals and 12 assists for 23 points to finish fifth on the team in scoring.

=== Professional ===
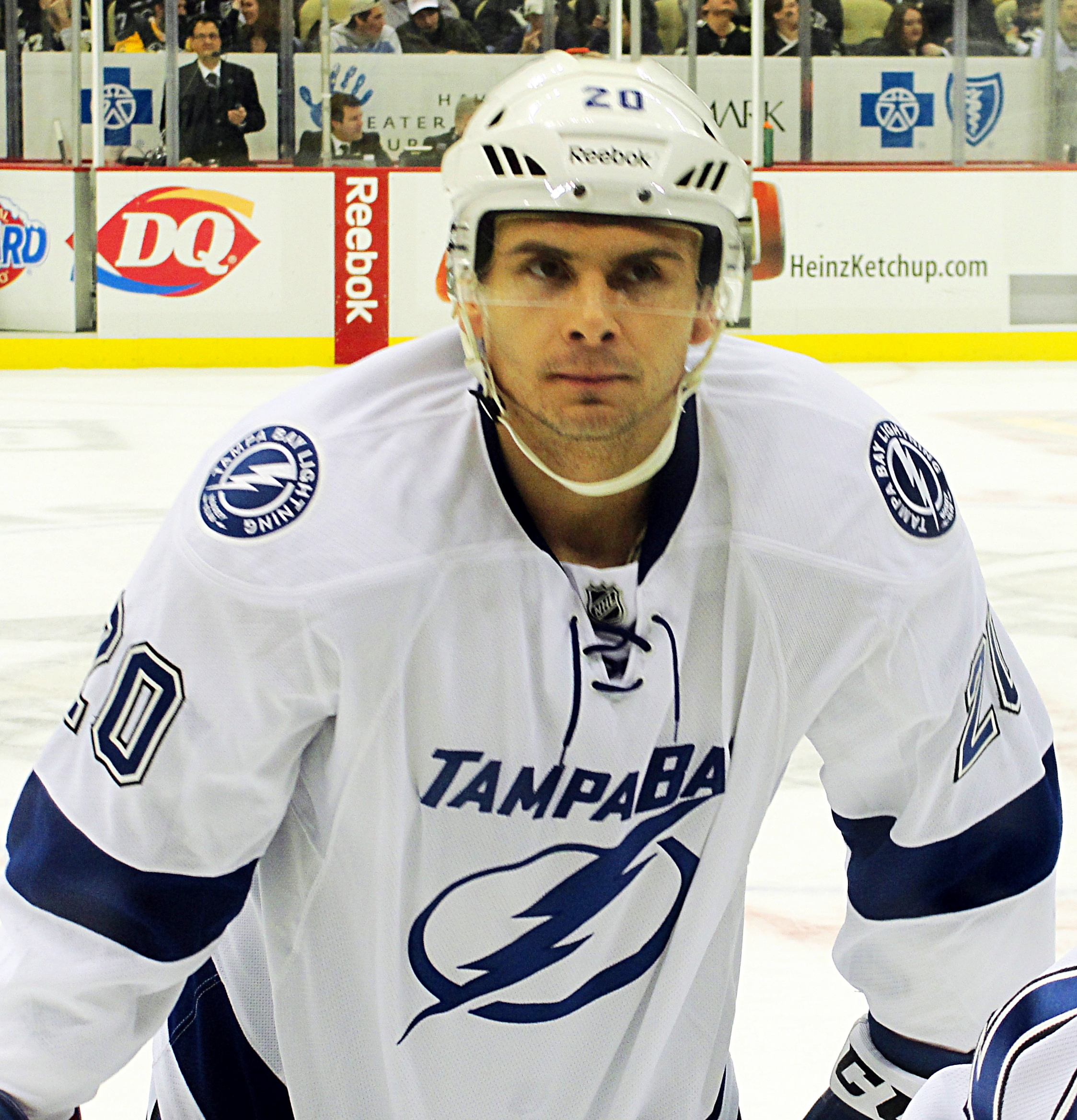
Wallace with the Lightning in 2012.

An undrafted free agent, Wallace was signed to a contract after attending a tryout camp with Pittsburgh in the fall of 2006. In his first season, he split time between the ECHL's Wheeling Nailers and the AHL's Wilkes-Barre/Scranton Penguins, seeing action in 51 games with 11 goals and 20 assists for 31 points and 62 penalty minutes. He played in 11 playoff games for Wilkes-Barre/Scranton, scoring a goal and an assist. In 2007–08, Wallace played in 74 games with Wilkes-Barre/Scranton, accruing 12 goals and 14 assists for 26 points and 83 minutes in penalties. He played in 22 postseason games in helping the Baby Penguins advance to the Calder Cup finals against Chicago. He had two goals and six assists for eight points and 21 penalty minutes in the playoffs.

Wallace made his NHL debut on December 10, 2008, against the New Jersey Devils. He registered his first NHL point, an assist, on December 18, 2008, vs. the Atlanta Thrashers.

On February 23, 2012, Wallace was claimed off waivers by Tampa Bay Lightning from the New York Islanders after playing 31 games in the NHL season.

After seven professional seasons within North America, Wallace left as a free agent and signed a one-year contract with Örebro HK of the Swedish Hockey League on August 6, 2013. In his debut season in Sweden, Wallace adapted quickly in Örebro, posting 15 goals and 32 points in 55 games to earn a one-year contract extension on April 3, 2014. In the midst of the 2014–15 season, having been unable to replicate his previous seasons form with Örebro, Wallace was loaned to fellow SHL outfit Brynäs IF on December 10, 2014.

On September 7, 2015, having left Sweden after two-years as a free agent, Wallace agreed to a one-year contract with German club, Grizzlys Wolfsburg of the Deutsche Eishockey Liga.

As a free agent after three seasons abroad, Wallace opted to return to his hometown in Anchorage, and agreed to play in third tier ECHL, signing a standard contract with the Alaska Aces on October 13, 2016.

On May 25, 2017, Wallace again left North America and moved to the UK to sign a one-year deal with the Sheffield Steelers of the EIHL.

After a season in Sheffield, Wallace moved to league rivals Milton Keynes Lightning in 2018. Wallace and teammate Ryan Lannon subsequently replaced Doug McKay as Lightning head coach early into the 2018–19 EIHL season. He later re-signed as a Milton Keynes Lightning player in January 2022 following his departure from Nottingham, and will combine his playing role with the title of Director of Hockey Development.

He re-signed as a Milton Keynes player for the 2022–23 season, where he will serve as the club's Player/Coach following the departure of Lewis Clifford.

== Coaching career ==
After a spell as Player/Coach of Milton Keynes Lightning, Wallace was hired in 2019 by Nottingham Panthers director of hockey Guillaume Doucet to be the club's new head coach - replacing Rich Chernomaz. Wallace was relieved of his duties in Nottingham in January 2022.

In May 2022, Wallace replaced Lewis Clifford and returned for a second spell as Player/Coach with Milton Keynes Lightning, combining the role with his title of Director of Hockey Development.

Wallace won the NIHL Cup as Player/Coach in the 2023/24 Season with Milton Keynes Lightning, beating Hull Seahawks 10–5 on aggregate over two legs.

On February 19, 2026, Milton Keynes Lightning released a statement, stating Tim Wallace was stepping away from his head coach position.

In May 2026, Wallace was named the new head coach and general manager of EIHL side Fife Flyers.

== Career statistics ==
			Regular season					Playoffs
Season	Team	League	GP	G	A	Pts	PIM	GP	G	A	Pts	PIM
2000–01	U.S. National Under-18 Team	NAHL	56	8	11	19	45	—	—	—	—	—
2001–02	U.S. National Under-18 Team	USHL	21	4	7	11	16	—	—	—	—	—
2002–03	Notre Dame	CCHA	40	6	5	11	28	—	—	—	—	—
2003–04	Notre Dame	CCHA	39	3	8	11	10	—	—	—	—	—
2004–05	Notre Dame	CCHA	38	5	9	14	20	—	—	—	—	—
2005–06	Notre Dame	CCHA	36	11	12	23	28	—	—	—	—	—
2006–07	Wilkes-Barre/Scranton Penguins	AHL	32	5	9	14	39	11	1	1	2	2
2006–07	Wheeling Nailers	ECHL	19	6	11	17	23	—	—	—	—	—
2007–08	Wilkes-Barre/Scranton Penguins	AHL	74	12	14	26	82	22	2	6	8	21
2008–09	Wilkes-Barre/Scranton Penguins	AHL	58	11	8	19	51	7	0	2	2	2
2008–09	Pittsburgh Penguins	NHL	16	0	2	2	7	—	—	—	—	—
2009–10	Wilkes-Barre/Scranton Penguins	AHL	78	27	14	41	61	4	0	0	0	2
2009–10	Pittsburgh Penguins	NHL	1	0	0	0	0	—	—	—	—	—
2010–11	Wilkes-Barre/Scranton Penguins	AHL	62	20	17	37	61	10	1	4	5	6
2010–11	Pittsburgh Penguins	NHL	7	0	0	0	5	—	—	—	—	—
2011–12	Bridgeport Sound Tigers	AHL	24	9	11	20	13	—	—	—	—	—
2011–12	New York Islanders	NHL	31	0	1	1	6	—	—	—	—	—
2011–12	Tampa Bay Lightning	NHL	18	3	5	8	10	—	—	—	—	—
2012–13	Charlotte Checkers	AHL	47	9	13	22	44	3	1	1	2	0
2012–13	Carolina Hurricanes	NHL	28	1	1	2	17	—	—	—	—	—
2013–14	Örebro HK	SHL	55	15	17	32	30	—	—	—	—	—
2014–15	Örebro HK	SHL	27	3	5	8	14	—	—	—	—	—
2014–15	Brynäs IF	SHL	25	4	6	10	8	4	0	3	3	4
2015–16	Grizzlys Wolfsburg	DEL	45	4	13	17	34	6	0	2	2	2
2016–17	Alaska Aces	ECHL	63	18	29	47	42	—	—	—	—	—
2016–17	Bridgeport Sound Tigers	AHL	7	1	1	2	0	—	—	—	—	—
2017–18	Sheffield Steelers	EIHL	55	6	24	30	57	2	0	1	1	0
2018–19	Milton Keynes Lightning	EIHL	60	21	36	57	58	—	—	—	—	—
2021–22	Milton Keynes Lightning	NIHL	21	6	14	20	22	8	6	8	14	2
2022–23	Milton Keynes Lightning	NIHL	55	23	67	90	47	2	0	2	2	0
2023–24	Milton Keynes Lightning	NIHL	51	23	43	66	58	2	0	0	0	0
NHL totals			101	4	9	13	45	—	—	—	—	—

Medal record

Representing the United States

Ice hockey

IIHF World U18 Championships
Gold medal – first place	2002 Slovakia	

=== International ===
Year	Team	Event	Result	GP	G	A	Pts	PIM
2002	United States	WJC18	1st place, gold medalist(s)	8	2	5	7	6
Junior totals				8	2	5	7	6
