= Tom Carlon =

English ice hockey player (born 1987)

- Born: 18 February 1987 (age 39) Telford, England
- Height: 6 ft 4 in (193 cm)
- Weight: 215 lb (98 kg; 15 st 5 lb)
- Position: Forward
- Shot: Right
- Played for: Telford Tigers; Belfast Giants; Coventry Blaze; Bracknell Bees; Peterborough Phantoms; Slough Jets; Milton Keynes Lightning; Abu Dhabi Storms; Milton Keynes Thunder
- Playing career: 2002–2018

Tom Carlon (born 18 February 1987 in Telford, England) is an English former professional ice hockey player, who last played for the Milton Keynes Thunder in the National Ice Hockey League as their team captain.

== Career ==
Carlon began his career playing for his local team, the Telford Wild Foxes of the EngL. In his first season, Carlon managed to play 24 games and total 11 points, which was an impressive amount for a young teenager, aged 14 and a half. Carlon also Captained the GB U18 side. He has won many medals while playing for GB. Carlon saw his name and stick go into the hall of fame in Canada when he scored the game-winning goal in the world championships to win the gold medal. He also scored a hat-trick in this game.

Carlon gained a two-way deal with the Coventry Blaze while playing with the Telford Tigers. He moved to Coventry to play full-time with the Coventry Blaze for the season 2006–2007. After a season there where he scored 4 goals and 1 assist he moved to the EPL to play for the Bracknell Bees. Carlon started the season off with an average of 2 goals a game. He played 61 games, scored 20 goals and assisted 28 goals. He then returned to Telford for the 2008–09 season before moving on to the Peterborough Phantoms for the next two seasons. After a brief stint with the Slough Jets in the 2011–12 season, he returned to Peterborough and remained until 2013 when he moved to the Milton Keynes Lightning. He would go on have a spell in the United Arab Emirates for the Abu Dhabi Storms before returning to Milton Keynes with the Lightning and then the Milton Keynes Thunder, who replaced the Lighting in the National Ice Hockey League after they moved to the Elite Ice Hockey League

On 30 October 2018, the Milton Keynes Thunder announced on their Facebook page that Carlon had retired, having given them two weeks notice and played the remaining games in that spell before departing.

== Career statistics ==
2002-03 Telford Wild Foxes EngL 24 5 6 11 20
2003-04 Telford Wild Foxes EngL 21 20 13 33 34
2004-05 Coventry Blaze EIHL 2 0 0 0 0
2004-05 Telford Wild Foxes EngL 26 15 12 27 80
2005-06 Telford Tigers EPL 36 15 13 28 51
2005-06 Coventry Blaze EIHL 4 0 0 0 0 -- -- -- -- --
2006-07 Coventry Blaze EIHL 64 4 1 5 36
2007-08 Bracknell Bees EPL 61 20 28 48 86 7 0 4
2009-10 Peterborough Phantoms EPL 45 15 17 32 52
2013-14 Milton Keynes Lightning (Season Not Started)
