= Antti Hölli =

Finnish ice hockey player

- Born: July 16, 1987 (age 37); Kangasala, Finland
- Height: 6 ft 0 in (183 cm)
- Weight: 189 lb (86 kg; 13 st 7 lb)
- Position: Right wing
- Shot: Left
- SM-liiga team: Ilves
- NHL draft: Undrafted
- Playing career: 2006–2017

Antti Hölli (born July 16, 1987) is a Finnish ice hockey player.

Holli made his SM-liiga debut playing with Tappara during the 2006–07 SM-liiga season.

== Career statistics ==
			Regular season					Playoffs
Season	Team	League	GP	G	A	Pts	PIM	GP	G	A	Pts	PIM
2002–03	Ilves U16	U16 SM-sarja	14	3	13	16	12	6	8	1	9	6
2003–04	Ilves U18	U18 SM-sarja	30	17	14	31	28	—	—	—	—	—
2004–05	Ilves U18	U18 SM-sarja	4	0	0	0	8	—	—	—	—	—
2004–05	Ilves U20	U20 SM-liiga	24	3	4	7	18	10	0	1	1	2
2005–06	Ilves U20	U20 SM-liiga	37	17	11	28	38	2	0	0	0	36
2006–07	Tappara U20	U20 SM-liiga	31	12	14	26	44	9	1	2	3	4
2006–07	Tappara	SM-liiga	10	0	0	0	0	—	—	—	—	—
2006–07	Suomi U20	Mestis	1	0	0	0	2	—	—	—	—	—
2007–08	Tappara U20	U20 SM-liiga	41	16	16	32	77	3	1	0	1	4
2008–09	HeKi	Mestis	28	6	9	15	24	—	—	—	—	—
2008–09	LeKi	Mestis	8	3	5	8	6	2	0	0	0	2
2009–10	LeKi	Mestis	41	20	14	34	42	8	2	1	3	10
2010–11	Vaasan Sport	Mestis	45	16	15	31	24	11	5	5	10	6
2011–12	Herning Blue Fox	Denmark	36	13	24	37	22	14	3	7	10	8
2012–13	LeKi	Mestis	34	20	13	33	12	—	—	—	—	—
2012–13	Ilves	SM-liiga	8	0	1	1	8	—	—	—	—	—
2013–14	Ilves	Liiga	39	3	3	6	8	—	—	—	—	—
2013–14	LeKi	Mestis	3	2	1	3	2	—	—	—	—	—
2014–15	Herlev Eagles	Denmark	34	12	16	28	41	—	—	—	—	—
2015–16	LeKi	Mestis	6	1	3	4	0	—	—	—	—	—
2015–16	Herlev Eagles	Denmark	27	10	10	20	8	—	—	—	—	—
2015–16	SønderjyskE Ishockey	Denmark	2	0	0	0	2	13	3	2	5	8
2016–17	MHC Martin	Slovak	5	1	0	1	0	—	—	—	—	—
2016–17	Milton Keynes Lightning	EPIHL	32	12	31	43	20	8	7	8	15	2
SM-liiga totals			57	3	4	7	16	4	3	0	3	0
Mestis totals			166	68	60	128	112	21	7	6	13	18
