= Zapotec =

Zapotec (English: /ˈsɒpoʊˌtɛk/) or zapoteca may refer to:

== Cultures and languages ==
- Zapotec civilization, a historical indigenous pre-Columbian civilization and archaeological culture of central Mexico
- Zapotec languages, a group of closely related indigenous Mesoamerican languages
- Zapotec peoples, contemporary indigenous peoples of Mexico
- Zapotecan languages, a group of related Oto-Manguean languages (including Zapotec languages), of central Mesoamerica
- Zapotec language (Jalisco), an extinct language from Jalisco state in Mexico, unrelated (despite its name) to the group of Zapotec languages.

== Other uses ==
- Zapoteca (plant), a legume genus

== See also ==
- Emil Zátopek, athlete from Czechoslovakia
  - Zátopek (film), a 2021 Czech film about him
- Lukáš Zátopek, Czech ice hockey player
