= Planet Ice Milton Keynes =

Ice hockey venue in England

- The MK Arena, The Thunderdome
- Area around Planet Ice Milton Keynes
- Former names: The Thunderdome, Bladerunner Arena
- Location: Planet Ice, 1 South Row, Central Milton Keynes, Milton Keynes MK9 1BL
- Coordinates: 52.0325°N 0.7710°W
- Owner: AEW UK Ltd
- Operator: Planet Ice
- Capacity: 2,800 (2,200 seated)

Construction
- Opened: 1990
- Renovated: 2013–2014

Tenants
- Milton Keynes Thunder (2001–present); Milton Keynes Lightning (2002–present); Milton Keynes Lions (1998–2012); Milton Keynes Kings (1990–1996, 1998–2002); London Knights (1998–2000)

Planet Ice Milton Keynes (formerly known as Bladerunner Arena) is a 2,800-capacity multi-purpose hockey rink operated by Planet Ice in Milton Keynes, England, as part of the Leisure Plaza complex (near the Central station).

== Arena history ==
=== Opening ===
In 1990, the rink opened as the Bladerunner Arena as part of the brand new Leisure Plaza complex, located close to Milton Keynes Central railway station. The Leisure Plaza facility offered a leisure and retail complex to Milton Keynes: the location featured trees, shrubbery, family picnic areas and a large pond hosting wildlife and plants with a footbridge crossing the water. In addition to the ice rink, the new complex also featured Flamingo's nightclub, Megabowl 10-pin bowling alley, Cafe Moonshine (later Heroes sports bar), an Argos superstore and Homebase centre.

The ice rink itself boasted 2,200 seats, 3 licensed bars (one overlooking the ice surface, the other a kiosk at ice level), a restaurant, 3 function rooms (2 of which overlooked the ice surface – one having a bar), an ice sports shop, cafeteria, video games area, skate hire, 8 team changing rooms (1 reserved for the home professional ice hockey team), DJ box, management offices and an olympic sized ice pad. Its facilities and ice pad was one of several rinks which opened in the 1980s and 1990s. In the early 1990s two of Bladerunner's smaller changing rooms were converted into a large changing room, office and meeting area for the specific use of the Milton Keynes Kings Junior Ice Hockey Club.

=== 1990–96 ===
Bladerunner would regularly sellout on Kings game nights and would often have to turn customers away due to the success of their public ice skating sessions. Other events included ice shows, figure skating competitions and concerts. On several occasions the Great Britain men's national ice hockey team used the arena for training camps and games and it was also used as the training base for Olympic champion figure skaters, Jane Torvill & Christopher Dean.

In 1992 arena owners First Leisure closed the venue, however it was opened soon after following public outcry, including public rallies outside the offices of Milton Keynes Council and First Leisure. Public demand saw the ice rink re-open in time for the 1992/93 ice hockey season. However this was not the last time the ice rink would close its doors, a second short closing and re-opening in the early 1990s was followed by a permanent closure in 1996.

=== 1996 closure ===
Public protest and the popularity of the Kings ice hockey team were not enough to find a new owner for the ice rink and the doors became locked, apparently for good, in the summer of 1996. Users of the ice rink instead were forced to travel over an hour to ice rinks in Oxford, Stevenage, Peterborough and Haringey – including the MK Kings Junior Ice Hockey Club who re-located first to Stevenage and then to Haringey under the Milton Keynes name.

=== 1998 re-opening ===
After two years of closure the arena re-opened under the new ownership in April 1998 and was renamed Planet Ice, with the Kings ice hockey team being re-formed in the third tier of English ice hockey under the ownership of local businessman Mike Darnell. Popularity of the venue was just as high as when the venue first opened in 1990, with Planet Ice's learn to skate courses being over-subscribed for several years. The arena featured several changes when it was re-opened, including; large scale re-decoration, the ice sports shop in the arena concourse being bricked up, the alcohol kiosk at bar level converted into a store room, a new 'Skate Xpress' shop opening in the skate hire area of the building. Not all areas of the ice rink complex re-opened, including the restaurant which remained closed.

In addition to the MK Kings re-formation, Planet Ice reached an agreement with Anschutz Entertainment Group for their newly formed Superleague side London Knights to use the arena as their training base. This saw the junior club's purpose built changing room converted into a luxury dressing room with a two of the smaller changing rooms converted into an office and gym, all for exclusive use by the Knights. Delays in the opening of the Knights new arena in London saw the team play several home games in Milton Keynes before they were finally able to host games at the London Arena whilst the team trained and lived in MK. Planet Ice was sporadically converted into a basketball court and used as home venue for British Basketball League side Milton Keynes Lions for home games selected for live television coverage on Sky Sports.

=== 2000–02 ===
The Knights left Milton Keynes in the summer of 2000, moving to Lea Valley to be based closer to their home arena. The next year in 2001 saw the formation of a new senior ice hockey team, Milton Keynes Thunder to play at the fourth level of English ice hockey, key for local players not good enough to make the step up to the Kings team who had by now moved up to the second tier British National League. In 2001 a second senior ice hockey team, Milton Keynes Thunder, began using the arena as their home venue, albeit in the lower leagues of British ice hockey. A dispute over which league the Kings team should compete in led to Planet Ice evicting them from the arena in 2002, with the new Milton Keynes Lightning formed in their place who joined the third tier English Premier League.

=== 2002–2013 ===
Thunder and Lightning have remained in the arena since, with Lightning achieving multiple league, playoffs and cup championships over their 10 seasons – both teams have also moved up one league tier since their inceptions – although attendances at games have diminished since Wimbledon FC moved to Milton Keynes in 2003. In 2012 the MK Lions basketball side explored the possibility of using Planet Ice as a permanent home following the closure of nearby Prestige Homes Arena, however no agreement was reached and the team re-located out of the city.

Since the opening of the Xscape development in Central Milton Keynes, Leisure Plaza lost its prestige and had become rather neglected as the popularity of this once popular complex diminished. Flamingo's nightclub closed and was re-opened as 'Empire' but closed down again in the mid-2000s and has been shut since. Heroes sports bar also closed before re-opening as 'Smile Gentleman's Club'.

=== 2013–14 refurbishment ===
Plans to refurbish the site, including upgrading the ice arena and the opening of apartments, retail units, a supermarket and casino, had been planned for some years; in March 2013 the redevelopment of the rink was confirmed as starting in summer 2013 with the permanent closure of the bowling alley. The ice rink closed on 14 July 2013 and redevelopment work started. The new rink opened in late 2014 in conjunction with a Morrisons Supermarket and another as yet unannounced shopping unit.

=== 2017– ===
In April 2017, AEW UK bought the freehold interest in the arena building from Planet Ice.

In June 2018, Strong Style Evolved UK, a two-day professional wrestling event promoted by New Japan Pro-Wrestling, took place at the Planet Ice Arena.

In March 2020, the venue was temporarily transformed into a morgue to help deal with the casualties of the coronavirus pandemic.
