= Lewis Christie =

Scottish ice hockey player

- Born: 30 August 1988 (age 37) Edinburgh, Scotland
- Height: 5 ft 10 in (178 cm)
- Weight: 165 lb (75 kg; 11 st 11 lb)
- Position: Defence
- Shoots: Right
- NIHL team Former teams: Milton Keynes Lightning; Dundee Stars; Edinburgh Capitals; Belfast Giants; Basingstoke Bison; Milton Keynes Lightning; Milton Keynes Thunder
- Playing career: 2007–present

Lewis Christie (born 30 August 1988) is a Scottish professional ice hockey defenceman who is currently playing for NIHL side Milton Keynes Lightning, who he rejoined in 2019. Christie had last played for the Milton Keynes Thunder.
