= Blaž Emeršič =

Slovenian ice hockey player

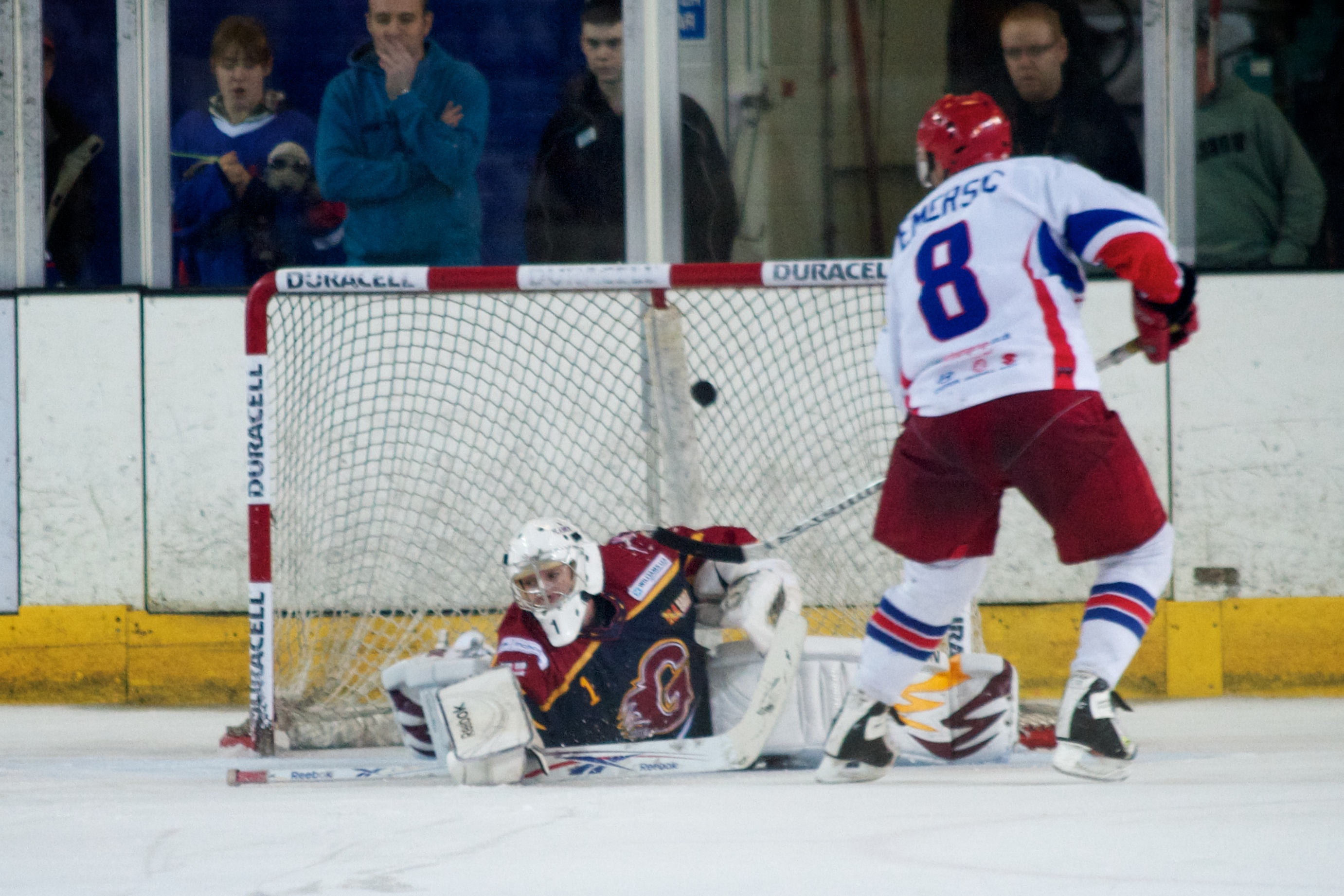
- Born: October 10, 1980 (age 44); Ljubljana, SR Slovenia, Yugoslavia
- Height: 6 ft 1 in (185 cm)
- Weight: 202 lb (92 kg; 14 st 6 lb)
- Position: Wing
- Shoots: Left
- EPIHL team Former teams: Milton Keynes Lightning; Slough Jets
- National team: Slovenia
- NHL draft: Undrafted
- Playing career: 1997–present

Blaž Emeršič (born October 10, 1980 in Ljubljana) is a Slovenian ice hockey player currently playing for Milton Keynes Lightning of the English Premier Ice Hockey League.

== Career ==
He began his career with Olimpija Ljubljana before moving to North America in 1999. He went to play for teams in the Central Hockey League, the ECHL and the American Hockey League.

Emeršič moved to the United Kingdom in 2005, signing for the Elite League's Nottingham Panthers. On November 5, 2005, in an Elite League match against the London Racers, he received severe facial injuries after being checked into the side of the rink. He made a full recovery and continued to play for the Panthers until moving to the Slough Jets in 2006. In January 2010, after a disagreement with the Slough Jets management, he accepted an offer from league champions Milton Keynes Lightning for the rest of the 2009/10 season. In June 2011, he signed a further one-season extension with Milton Keynes for the 2011/12 season.

== Career statistics ==
Regular season and playoffs

			Regular season					Playoffs
Season	Team	League	GP	G	A	Pts	PIM	GP	G	A	Pts	PIM
1998–99	Olimpija Ljubljana	Alpen	30	7	5	12	11	—	—	—	—	—
1999–00	Indianapolis Ice	CHL	38	20	18	38	36	12	2	2	4	0
1999–00	Arkansas RiverBlades	ECHL	1	0	0	0	0	—	—	—	—	—
1999–00	Peoria Rivermen	ECHL	12	0	1	1	0	—	—	—	—	—
2000–01	Border-City Bandits	CHL	28	6	8	14	6	—	—	—	—	—
2000–01	Greenville Grrrowl	ECHL	3	0	0	0	0	—	—	—	—	—
2000–01	Peoria Rivermen	ECHL	12	0	0	0	0	—	—	—	—	—
2001–02	Utah Grizzlies	AHL	5	1	1	2	4	—	—	—	—	—
2001–02	Wichita Thunder	CHL	46	20	20	40	6	—	—	—	—	—
2001–02	Lubbock Cotton Kings	CHL	19	9	14	23	6	—	—	—	—	—
2002–03	Lubbock Cotton Kings	CHL	63	33	40	73	4	—	—	—	—	—
2003–04	Charlotte Checkers	ECHL	70	16	11	27	12	—	—	—	—	—
2004–05	Rio Grande Valley Killer Bees	CHL	60	10	15	25	33	—	—	—	—	—
2005–06	Nottingham Panthers	EIHL	6	2	2	4	4	—	—	—	—	—
2006–07	Nottingham Panthers	EIHL	18	1	1	2	22	—	—	—	—	—
2005–06	Slough Jets	EPL	24	20	20	40	20	6	0	8	8	4
2007–08	Slough Jets	EPL	36	18	31	49	16	8	5	4	9	2
2008–09	Slough Jets	EPL	54	18	36	54	47	—	—	—	—	—
2009–10	Slough Jets	EPL	54	53	52	105	4	4	5	0	5	2
2010–11	Slough Jets	EPL	26	10	15	25	4	—	—	—	—	—
2010–11	Milton Keynes Lightning	EPL	28	14	25	39	4	4	2	0	2	0
2011–12	Milton Keynes Lightning	EPL	In Progress
Totals			578	234	275	509	231	30	12	14	26	8

International

Year	Team	Event	GP	G	A	Pts	PIM
1995-96	Slovenia U-18	U18	4	1	0	1	0
1996-97	Slovenia U-18	U18	5	2	1	3	4
1999	Slovenia	WJC	4	5	5	10	0
2001	Slovenia	WC D1	5	1	1	2	0
2004	Slovenia	WC D1	5	0	0	0	4
Junior totals			13	8	6	14	4
Senior totals			10	1	1	2	4
