= Tomáš Káňa =

Czech ice hockey player (born 1987)

- Born: November 29, 1987 (age 38) Opava, Czechoslovakia
- Height: 6 ft 0 in (183 cm)
- Weight: 208 lb (94 kg; 14 st 12 lb)
- Position: Center
- Shoots: Left
- NIHL team Former teams: Milton Keynes Lightning; HC Vitkovice; HC Slovan Ústečtí Lvi; Columbus Blue Jackets; HC Karlovy Vary; Piráti Chomutov; Arystan Temirtau; MsHK Žilina; HC Oceláři Třinec
- NHL draft: 31st overall, 2006; St. Louis Blues
- Playing career: 2005–present

Tomáš Káňa (born November 29, 1987) is a Czech professional ice hockey player currently playing for Milton Keynes Lightning in the National Ice Hockey League (NIHL).

== Playing career ==
Káňa, a center, played two seasons in the Czech Extraliga with HC Vítkovice before being drafted 31st overall by the St. Louis Blues in the 2006 NHL entry draft. On May 23, 2007, Káňa was signed to a three-year entry-level contract with the Blues. Káňa spent the majority of his contract with the Blues' second tier affiliate, the Alaska Aces of the ECHL.

On December 8, 2009, Tomas was traded by St. Louis, along with Brendan Bell, to the Columbus Blue Jackets for Pascal Pelletier. He was then assigned to AHL affiliate, Syracuse Crunch, where he scored an impressive 15 goals in 50 games. With newfound confidence Káňa was recalled to the Blue Jackets at the end of the 2009–10 season and made his NHL debut in a 3–2 victory over the Tampa Bay Lightning on March 30, 2010. He later recorded his first career NHL points, both assists, in a 4–3 defeat to the Detroit Red Wings on April 7, 2010.

On June 6, 2011, Kana signed a two-year contract to return to his original Czech team HC Vitkovice.

== Career statistics ==
=== Regular season and playoffs ===
			Regular season					Playoffs
Season	Team	League	GP	G	A	Pts	PIM	GP	G	A	Pts	PIM
2002–03	HC Vítkovice	CZE U18	44	20	14	34	74	2	2	0	2	4
2002–03	HC Vítkovice	CZE U20	3	2	0	2	4	—	—	—	—	—
2003–04	HC Vítkovice	CZE U18	9	2	9	11	33	7	4	5	9	18
2003–04	HC Vítkovice	CZE U20	50	12	7	19	78	—	—	—	—	—
2004–05	HC Vítkovice	CZE U20	46	12	22	34	155	2	0	0	0	2
2004–05	HC Vítkovice	ELH	1	0	0	0	0	—	—	—	—	—
2005–06	HC Vítkovice Steel	CZE U20	5	4	3	7	16	—	—	—	—	—
2005–06	HC Vítkovice Steel	ELH	42	5	9	14	50	6	0	1	1	2
2006–07	HC Vítkovice Steel	ELH	44	9	7	16	54	—	—	—	—	—
2006–07	BK Mladá Boleslav	CZE.2	6	2	1	3	16	6	1	0	1	16
2007–08	Alaska Aces	ECHL	12	2	0	2	4	—	—	—	—	—
2007–08	HC Vítkovice Steel	ELH	8	1	1	2	6	—	—	—	—	—
2007–08	HC Slovan Ústečtí Lvi	ELH	5	0	1	1	10	—	—	—	—	—
2007–08	HC Sareza Ostrava	CZE.2	8	3	0	3	6	—	—	—	—	—
2008–09	Alaska Aces	ECHL	30	6	14	20	65	21	1	2	3	10
2008–09	Peoria Rivermen	AHL	18	1	0	1	15	—	—	—	—	—
2009–10	Alaska Aces	ECHL	11	0	6	6	10	—	—	—	—	—
2009–10	Syracuse Crunch	AHL	50	15	13	28	47	—	—	—	—	—
2009–10	Columbus Blue Jackets	NHL	6	0	2	2	2	—	—	—	—	—
2010–11	Springfield Falcons	AHL	31	2	4	6	43	—	—	—	—	—
2011–12	HC Vítkovice Steel	ELH	36	5	4	9	36	7	0	0	0	4
2012–13	HC Vítkovice Steel	ELH	9	0	1	1	0	—	—	—	—	—
2012–13	HC Energie Karlovy Vary	ELH	15	0	1	1	6	—	—	—	—	—
2012–13	Piráti Chomutov	ELH	9	1	0	1	8	—	—	—	—	—
2013–14	HC Orlová	CZE.3	5	1	1	2	6	—	—	—	—	—
2013–14	Arystan Temirtau	KAZ	23	10	11	21	40	7	1	0	1	10
2014–15	LHK Jestřábi Prostějov	CZE.2	5	1	1	2	4	—	—	—	—	—
2014–15	EHC Klostersee	GER.3	4	0	1	1	4	—	—	—	—	—
2014–15	MsHK DOXXbet Žilina	SVK	5	0	1	1	2	—	—	—	—	—
2014–15	Swindon Wildcats	GBR.2	12	8	5	13	45	2	1	2	3	38
2015–16	HC Frýdek–Místek	CZE.3	36	12	34	46	81	11	6	10	16	32
2015–16	HC Oceláři Třinec	ELH	4	1	0	1	0	—	—	—	—	—
2016–17	HC Frýdek–Místek	CZE.2	17	2	4	6	10	—	—	—	—	—
2016–17	HSC Csíkszereda	MOL	6	0	0	0	0	—	—	—	—	—
2016–17	HSC Csíkszereda	ROU	6	7	6	13	4	9	2	3	5	2
2017–18	HC RT TORAX Poruba 2011	CZE.3	40	14	21	35	36	8	7	9	16	29
2018–19	KH Zagłębie Sosnowiec	POL	36	14	13	27	38	3	1	1	2	18
2019–20	Milton Keynes Lightning	GBR.2	49	30	38	68	133	—	—	—	—	—
2021–22	HK Nový Jičín	CZE.3	32	13	11	24	20	13	4	7	11	8
2022–23	HC Slezan Opava	CZE.3	28	11	14	25	18	—	—	—	—	—
ELH totals			173	22	24	46	170	13	0	1	1	6
NHL totals			6	0	2	2	2	—	—	—	—	—

=== International ===
Year	Team	Event	Result	GP	G	A	Pts	PIM
2005	Czech Republic	WJC18	4th	7	2	4	6	8
2006	Czech Republic	WJC	6th	6	2	0	2	6
2007	Czech Republic	WJC	5th	6	2	3	5	6
Junior totals				19	6	7	13	20
