= Leigh Jamieson =

English ice hockey player

- Born: 30 July 1985 (age 39); Milton Keynes, ENG
- Height: 6 ft 4 in (193 cm)
- Weight: 196 lb (89 kg; 14 st 0 lb)
- Position: Defence/Forward
- Shoots: Right
- NIHL team Former teams: Milton Keynes Lightning; Milton Keynes Kings; Belfast Giants; Coventry Blaze; Peterborough Phantoms; Streatham IHC
- National team: Great Britain
- Playing career: 2002–present

Leigh Jamieson (born 30 July 1985) is an English professional ice hockey player currently playing for Milton Keynes Lightning in the National Ice Hockey League (NIHL).

Jamieson began his career with his hometown Milton Keynes Kings and also played for England Under 20's before joining another MK team the Milton Keynes Lightning. He then signed with Elite League team the Belfast Giants where he was a key member of their squad and helped them with the Elite League title in 2006. His performances for the Giants also earned him a place in the Great Britain national ice hockey team. After five seasons with the Giants he signed for the Coventry Blaze. In 2009, Jamieson returned home and re-signed with the Milton Keynes Lightning, helping them win the EPIHL title that season and has made the EPIHL First All-Star team in three successive seasons.

After a spells with Peterborough Phantoms and Streatham IHC, Jamieson re-joined Milton Keynes Lightning in 2019. He then agreed to remain with the Lightning ahead of the 2020–21 season.
