= Neil Adams (ice hockey) =

English ice hockey player

- Born: May 26, 1982 (age 42); Birmingham, England
- Height: 6 ft 2 in (188 cm)
- Weight: 189 lb (86 kg; 13 st 7 lb)
- Position: Forward
- Shoots: Right
- ENIHL team Former teams: Solihull Barons; Romford Raiders; Guildford Flames solihull mk kings
- NHL draft: Undrafted
- Playing career: 1997–present

Neil Adams (born 26 May 1982 in Birmingham, United Kingdom) is an English senior ice hockey Forward.

== Playing career ==
Adams has spent most of his career playing in the EPIHL, for teams such as Solihull Barons, Romford Raiders and Guildford Flames. From the age of 14 Adams also represented Great Britain at the junior level. Adams' most successful season statistically to date was the 2007/08 season he spent in the ENIHL with Solihull. This is the only time he had played a season in British ice hockeys lowest senior league.

== Career stats ==
Team	League	Season	GP	Pts	PIMs
Solihull Blaze	EPL	97/98	3	2	2
Solihull Blaze	EPL	98/99	51	5	18
Solihull Blaze	BNL	99/00	42	1	2
Romford Raiders	EPL	00/01	13	10	38
solihull mk kings
Birmingham Rockets	BNL	02/03	18	15	131
Romford Raiders	EPL	03/04	2	1	0
Solihull Kings	EPL	03/04	25	17	28
Solihull Kings	EPL	04/05	41	38	50
Guildford Flames	Winter Cup	04/05	15	2	3
Solihull Barons	EPL	05/06	47	31	68
Solihull Barons	EPL	06/07	23	14	44
Solihull Barons	ENIHL	07/08	13	21	22
Great Britain Juniors	WJC u16s, u18s, and u20s	99, 00, 01 and 02	17	13	10
Career	-	-	301	174	404
