= Lukáš Zátopek =

Czech ice hockey player (born 1978)

- Born: 2 February 1978 (age 47) Havířov, Czechoslovakia
- Height: 6 ft 3 in (191 cm)
- Weight: 207 lb (94 kg; 14 st 11 lb)
- Position: Defense
- Shoots: Left
- EPIHL team Former teams: Milton Keynes Lightning; HC Vitkovice; Heilbronn Falcons; HK Nitra; HC Prostejov; HC Havirov Panthers; HC Prerov; DHK Latgale ESC Halle 04
- Playing career: 1998–present

Lukáš Zátopek (born 2 February 1978) is a Czech ice hockey player currently playing for Chelmsford Chieftains of the English National Ice Hockey League.

He began his career in 1998 with HC Vítkovice in the Czech Extraliga, the top level of hockey in the Czech Republic, where he stayed until 2001. In 2001 he moved to Heilbronn Falcons in Germany. He eventually moved to Slovakia, to play for MHC Nitra. In 2008 he moved from Germany to England to play for the Milton Keynes Lightning. in the English Premier Ice Hockey League.

During his career he has played for HC Vitkovice, Heilbronn Falcons, HC Prostejov, HC Havirov Panthers, HC Prerov, DHK Latgale and ESC Halle 04 before eventually joining his current club Milton Keynes Lightning.

== Career statistics ==
			Regular season					Playoffs
Season	Team	League	GP	G	A	Pts	PIM	GP	G	A	Pts	PIM
1998-1999	HC Vitkovice	Czech Extraliga	28	1	1	2	10	3	0	0	0	—
1999-2000	HC Vitkovice	Czech Extraliga	42	2	1	3	18	—	—	—	—	—
2000-2001	HC Vitkovice	Czech Extraliga	38	3	1	4	18	7	0	0	0	4
2001-2002	Heilbronn Falcons	2. Bundesliga	29	1	5	6	28	4	0	1	1	—
2001–2002	HK Nitra	Slovakian Extraliga	22	0	3	3	26	—	—	—	—	—
2002-2003	HC Vitkovice	Czech	29	1	0	1	16	1	0	0	0	—
2003-2004	HC Prostejov	1. liga (Czech)	33	4	4	8	-	—	—	—	—	—
2004-2005	HC Havirov Panthers	1. liga (Czech)	19	1	0	1	-7	—	—	—	—	—
2004-2005	HC Prerov	2. liga (Czech)	12	2	2	4	—	—	—	—	—	—
2005-2006	DHK Latgale	Latvian League	—	7	9	16	—	—	—	—	—	—
2006-2007	DHK Latgale	Latvian League	42	6	10	16	—	—	—	—	—	—
2007-2008	ESC Halle 04	Oberliga	29	4	24	28	—	3	0	1	1	—
2008-2009	Milton Keynes Lightning	EPIHL	53	10	31	41	—	—	—	—	—	—
2009-2010	Milton Keynes Lightning	EPIHL	50	15	34	49	70	—	—	—	—	—
2010-2011	Milton Keynes Lightning	EPIHL	40	14	17	31	64	—	—	—	—	—
2011-2012	Milton Keynes Lightning	EPIHL	34	6	9	15	50	—	—	—	—	—
