= Matt Nickerson =

American ice hockey player (born 1985)

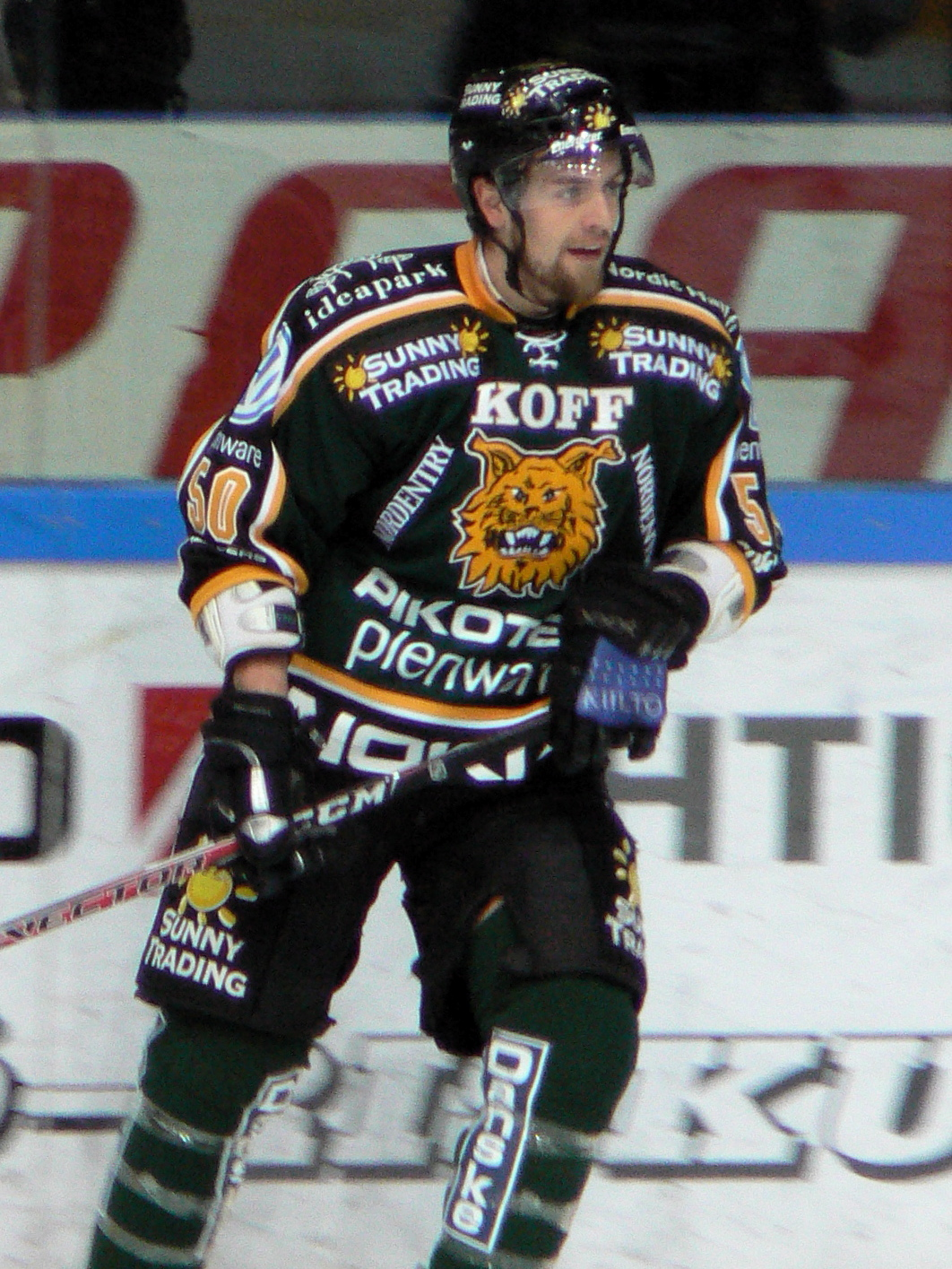
- Born: January 11, 1985 (age 40) Old Lyme, Connecticut, U.S.
- Height: 6 ft 4 in (193 cm)
- Weight: 235 lb (107 kg; 16 st 11 lb)
- Position: Defense
- Shot: Right
- Mestis team Former teams: TuTo Turku; Milton Keynes Lightning; KooKoo; Ässät; Iowa Stars; Idaho Steelheads; Ilves; Malmö Redhawks; Springfield Falcons; Fife Flyers; Belfast Giants
- NHL draft: 99th overall, 2003; Dallas Stars
- Playing career: 2005–2019

Matt Nickerson (born January 11, 1985) is an American former professional ice hockey defenseman who last played for Finnish second tier side TuTo Turku. He previously played for three teams in the UK's EIHL.

== Playing career ==
Nickerson played for the Texas Tornado of the North American Hockey League during the 2001–02 and 2002–03 seasons. It was during his final season with the team that Nickerson drew the attention of NHL scouts, and in the 2003 NHL Entry Draft the Dallas Stars drafted Nickerson in the third round with the 99th overall pick. Nickerson spent his next season at Clarkson University, where he racked up 179 penalty minutes in 38 games. Nickerson signed a three-year entry-level contract before playing in Victoriaville. Due to the NHL lockout, he was sent to the Quebec Major Junior Hockey League's Victoriaville Tigres, and finally turned pro in the Finnish SM-liiga, playing with Ässät.

Started 2005-2006 in the Dallas Stars training camp where he scored a goal on Ty Conklin in an NHL exhibition game versus the Edmonton Oilers. Nickerson was then assigned to Iowa of the AHL where he played 4 exhibition games, registering one fighting major, before ending up in Pori, Finland. In his first season with Ässät, Nickerson broke the league record for penalty minutes in the regular season, with 236 total. He was assessed a match penalty for fighting in October 2005, and was suspended for three games for fighting and unsportsmanlike conduct on November 2, 2005.

After his first stint in SM-liiga Nickerson returned to North America for the 2006–07 season and played for the Idaho Steelheads of the ECHL and the Iowa Stars of the AHL, both affiliates of the Dallas Stars. He earned a 16-game suspension during his 12 games in Idaho. After a season in North America, Nickerson returned to Pori and joined Ässät for the second time in his career. On October 20, 2007, he was suspended for three games for attacking TPS forward Teemu Laine. While serving this suspension, he attacked Ilves defenseman Kevin Kantee in the locker room area of the Ässät arena on October 27, receiving an additional five-game suspension. Nickerson has turned out to be a fan favourite in Pori during his stints in Finland. In February 2008 Nickerson was transferred from Ässät to Ilves. On February 4, he received a match penalty for fighting in the Ilves-Blues game.

For the 2009-2010 season, he signed with the Edmonton Oilers organization but played just 19 games for the AHL's Springfield Falcons and was released without ever playing for the Oilers. Nickerson had a try-out with Danish team Esbjerg IK in November 2010 but failed to secure a contract. The Fife Flyers confirmed the signing of Matt Nickerson for the 2013/14 Rapid Solicitors Elite Ice Hockey League season. Nickerson quickly became a fan favorite at Fife where his tough edge added some much needed backbone to a team which had been bullied on the ice in the past. Playing 45 games in his first season he was an integral part in the run to the EIHL playoff semi final game where Fife lost to Belfast by 1-0. His unending desire to stand up for his team mates earned great respect from the Fife support although he did draw the attention of the EIHL referees and in December 2013 he was handed a 12-game suspension (which was reduced upon appeal) for a fight during a game against the Braehead Clan. As part of the Fife Flyers community outreach program Nickerson and team mates visited the children's hospice in Kinross operated by C.H.A.S. Touched by the work carried out by the charity Nickerson offered to let fans shave off his impressive trademark beard to raise money for the hospice. This charitable act received many plaudits from across the UK hockey community.

On 3 June 2017, after two years with the Belfast Giants, Nickerson joined EIHL newcomers Milton Keynes Lightning ahead of their inaugural Elite League season. During his time with the Lightning, Nickerson received a 20 game ban for abusing an official and punching a fan, and was released by the club the following day.

== Career statistics ==
			Regular season					Playoffs
Season	Team	League	GP	G	A	Pts	PIM	GP	G	A	Pts	PIM
2001–02	Texas Tornado	NAHL	47	1	12	13	97	—	—	—	—	—
2002–03	Texas Tornado	NAHL	47	6	23	29	277	—	—	—	—	—
2003–04	Clarkson University	ECAC	38	5	9	14	179	—	—	—	—	—
2004–05	Victoriaville Tigres	QMJHL	48	1	11	12	182	6	0	1	1	27
2005–06	Ässät	SM-liiga	36	5	8	13	236	14	1	0	1	50
2006–07	Iowa Stars	AHL	40	0	3	3	97	—	—	—	—	—
2006–07	Idaho Steelheads	ECHL	13	1	1	2	73	—	—	—	—	—
2007–08	Ässät	SM-liiga	25	1	6	7	106	—	—	—	—	—
2007–08	Ilves	SM-liiga	13	3	3	6	39	9	0	2	2	24
2008–09	Malmö Redhawks	Allsv	6	1	2	3	18	—	—	—	—	—
2008–09	Ilves	SM-liiga	40	1	1	2	156	3	1	0	1	0
2009–10	Springfield Falcons	AHL	19	0	1	1	44	—	—	—	—	—
2012–13	KooKoo	Mestis	41	1	11	12	154	—	—	—	—	—
2013–14	Fife Flyers	EIHL	40	2	7	9	307	4	0	1	1	6
2014–15	Fife Flyers	EIHL	46	2	15	17	192	2	0	0	0	4
2015–16	Belfast Giants	EIHL	35	3	6	9	93	2	0	0	0	0
2016–17	Belfast Giants	EIHL	51	2	12	14	77	3	1	0	1	6
2017–18	Milton Keynes Lightning	EIHL	36	2	4	6	150	—	—	—	—	—
2018–19	TUTO Hockey	Mestis	35	1	6	7	150	7	0	2	2	63
SM-liiga totals			114	10	18	28	537	26	2	2	4	74
EIHL totals			208	11	44	55	819	11	1	1	2	16
