= Milton Keynes Thunder =

Ice hockey team in Buckinghamshire, England

- City: Milton Keynes, Buckinghamshire
- League: NIHL
- Division: Division Two South
- Founded: 2001; 25 years ago
- Home arena: Planet Ice Arena Milton Keynes (capacity: 2,500)
- Colors: White, Black & Teal
- General manager: Lauren Cox (England)
- Head coach: Will Fry (England)
- Captain: Dominic Wealthall (England)
- Affiliates: Milton Keynes Lightning, Milton Keynes Storm
- Website: thundericehockey.co.uk

Championships
- NIHL South BBO Cup: 1 (2016–17)

The Milton Keynes Thunder are an ice hockey team from Milton Keynes, Buckinghamshire, they are known stylistically as Thunder. The team currently competes in the Wilkinson Conference, of the National Ice Hockey League Division 2 South (the forth tier of English National Ice Hockey). The team was founded in 2001 predominantly to provide competitive hockey and further development opportunities for players leaving the Milton Keynes Junior Ice Hockey system. Their home rink is the refurbished and renamed Planet Ice Arena, known locally as the Thunderdome. It has a capacity of circa 2,500.

== Club history ==
=== Foundation ===
Founded in 2001, MK Thunder originally shared their home rink with the Milton Keynes Kings. However, the MK Kings were involved in a dispute with rink operators Planet Ice, which led to their relocation to Solihull in May 2002. The space left by the MK Kings was eventually taken by the Milton Keynes Lightning which was formed in 2002.

=== Position in the Milton Keynes Ice Hockey structure ===
As the second most senior ice hockey club in Milton Keynes, the MK Thunder have always played in the National Ice Hockey League South or its former incarnations (English National League South, English National League South A and English National League South 1). It has been used as a vehicle to further develop Milton Keynes based players and has been a 'feeder' club for the senior hockey club Milton Keynes Lightning. The teams iced by the club have been dominated by local players, supplemented by the occasional import (league rules restrict the use of import players to just two, compared to five in the defunct old second tier EPIHL and eleven in the first tier EIHL). The club also has links with the junior system and provides development opportunities for junior players at the Milton Keynes Storm Club.

=== Arena redevelopment ===
In March 2013, Milton Keynes Council approved plans to redevelop the Leisure Plaza after failed attempts in 2006 and 2011. The development of the arena was funded by Morrisons Supermarkets and took 17 months to complete. This forced Thunder to play their home games at a temporary rink sited within the Milton Keynes City Centre in a building vacated by the Supermarket Waitrose. The rink and the MK ICE charity established to operate it was organised by the team's owner and the then general manager, David Fairhurst. The team returned to the redeveloped rink which had been renamed the "MK Arena" in October 2014.

=== Club honours ===
- NIHL League: 0
- NIHL Playoffs: 0
- NIHL BBO Cup: 1 2016–17

The Milton Keynes Thunder lifted their first silverware when they secured the NIHL South BBO Cup in the 2016–17 season.

== Club roster 2025–26 ==
Netminders
No.	Nat.	Player	Catches	Place of birth	Acquired
29	(England)	Aaron Burton	L	England	2024 from Bristol Pitbulls
36	(England)	Joseph Nolan	L	England	2025 from Nottingham Lions
37	(England)	Alfie Duguid	L	England	Prospect 2-Way with MK Storm

Defencemen
No.	Nat.	Player	Shoots	Place of birth	Acquired
5	(England)	Robert Oxley	R	England	2025 from Telford Tigers 2
10	(England)	Madison Wright	R	England	2-Way with Solihull Vixens
16	(England)	Corey Taylor	R	England	2025 from Haringey Huskies
23	(England)	James Bryan	R	England	Basingstoke
33	(England)	Joshua Furnell	R	England	Prospect 2-Way with MK Storm
38	(Spain)	Mikel Gomez-Ortega	R	England	Prospect 2-Way with MK Storm
40	(England)	Josh Hickman	R	England
55	(England)	Jaggar Billingham	R	England	2024 MK Storm
74	(England)	Dom Wealthall	R	England
77	(Canada)	Ryan Wonfor	L	Canada	2025 from Dunedin Thunder
81	(England)	James Moeller	R	England	2025 from Solihull Barons
94	(Canada)	Harry Foster	L	England	Prospect 2-Way with MK Storm

Forwards
No.	Nat.	Player	Shoots	Place of birth	Acquired
9	(Switzerland)	Sam Peters	R	Switzerland	2024 from Nottingham Mavericks
11	(England)	Elliott Davies	R	England	2024
14	(England)	Xander Robinson	R	England	2024 from Basingstoke Buffalo
17	(England)	William Rees	R	England	Prospect 2-Way with MK Storm
21	(England)	Mark Austen	R	England	2023 from Basingtoke
22	(England)	Harry MacGarvey	L	England	MK Storm
24	(England)	Charlie Conroy	R	England	MK Storm
45	(England)	Hayden Hagger	R	England	2019
63	(England)	Lewis Conroy	R	England	2-Way MK Lightning/MK Storm
64	(England)	Sam Purcell	R	England	Prospect 2-Way MK Storm
86	(Bulgaria)	Ivo Gaytanski	R	Bulgaria	Prospect 2-Way MK Storm
97	(Latvia)	Marks Kanins	L	Latvia	2025 from Nottingham Mavericks

== Statistical records ==
=== Top ten appearances ===
League, Cup & Play Offs; as at end of 2021/22 Season

Player
No.	Nat.	Player	Active Seasons	App
1	(England)	Harrison Goode	2007–2018 & 2020–2022	346
2	(England)	Paul Gore	2002–2009 & 2011–2017	335
3	(England)	Sam Fairhurst	2002–2015 inclusive	325
4	(England)	Matthew Roberts	2002–2003, 2004–2014 & 2015–2016	294
5	(England)	Alex Whyte	2013–2022 inclusive	280
6	(England)	Nidal Phillips	2009–2018 inclusive	279
7	(England)	Jamie Randall	2008–2009 & 2010–2017	267
8	(England)	Tom Mboya	2010–2019 inclusive	245
9	(England)	Lewis Clifford	2002–2011 inclusive	240
9	(England)	Connor Goode	2009–2013, 2014–2018 & 2021–2022	240

=== Top ten points scorers ===
League, Cup & Play Offs; as at end of 2021/22 Season

Player
No.	Nat.	Player	Active Seasons	Pts
1	(England)	Harrison Goode	2007–2018 & 2020–2022	231
2	(England)	Jamie Line	2010–2011 & 2014–2019	214
3	(England)	Ross Bowers	2010–2011 & 2015–2019	213
4	(England)	Alex Whyte	2013–2022 inclusive	170
5	(England)	Connor Goode	2009–2013, 2014–2018 & 2021–2022	163
6	(England)	Tom Mboya	2010–2019 inclusive	145
7	(England)	Jamie Randall	2008–2009 & 2010–2017	141
8	(England)	Michael Knights	2003–2006 & 2007–2011	121
9	(England)	Kieron Goody	2002–2011 inclusive	113
9	(Northern Ireland)	Aram Todd	2002–2007 & 2010–2011	113

=== Top ten goal scorers ===
League, Cup & Play Offs; as at end of 2021/22 Season

Player
No.	Nat.	Player	Active Seasons	Gls
1	(England)	Harrison Goode	2007–2018 & 2020–2022	110
2	(England)	Ross Bowers	2010–2011 & 2015–2019	107
3	(England)	Jamie Line	2010–2011 & 2014–2019	96
4	(England)	Connor Goode	2009–2013, 2014–2018 & 2021–2022	78
5	(England)	Paul Jamieson	2002–2011 inclusive	72
6	(England)	Tom Mboya	2010–2019 inclusive	68
7	(England)	Alex Whyte	2013–2022 inclusive	62
8	(Slovakia)	Maros Stefanco	2010–2012 inclusive	51
9	(England)	Michael Knights	2003–2006 & 2007–2011	48
10	(Northern Ireland)	Aram Todd	2002–2007 & 2010–2011	46
10	(England)	Kieron Goody	2002–2011 inclusive	46

=== Top ten goal assists ===
League, Cup & Play Offs; as at end of 2021/22 Season

Player
No.	Nat.	Player	Active Seasons	Ast
1	(England)	Harrison Goode	2007–2018 & 2020–2022	121
2	(England)	Jamie Line	2010–2011 & 2014–2019	119
3	(England)	Ross Bowers	2010–2011 & 2015–2019	108
3	(England)	Alex Whyte	2013–2022 inclusive	106
5	(England)	Jamie Randall	2008–2009 & 2010–2017	97
6	(England)	Connor Goode	2009–2013, 2014–2018 & 2021–2022	85
7	(England)	Tom Mboya	2010–2019 inclusive	77
8	(England)	Michael Knights	2003–2006 & 2007–2011	71
9	(England)	Kieron Goody	2002–2011 inclusive	67
9	(Northern Ireland)	Aram Todd	2002–2007 & 2010–2011	67

=== Top ten penalty minutes ===
League, Cup & Play Offs; as at end of 2021/22 Season

Player
No.	Nat.	Player	Active Seasons	PIM
1	(England)	Matthew Roberts	2002–2003, 2004–2014 & 2015–2016	1520
2	(England)	Paul Gore	2002–2009 & 2011–2017	932
3	(England)	Lee Featherstone	2003–2008 & 2009–2012	746
4	(England)	Paul Jamieson	2002–2011 inclusive	684
5	(England)	Michael Knights	2003–2006 & 2007–2011	592
6	(England)	James Roberts	2002–2009 inclusive	555
7	(England)	Lewis Clifford	2002–2011 inclusive	464
8	(England)	Harrison Goode	2007–2018 & 2020–2022	370
9	(England)	Kieron Goody	2002–2011 inclusive	320
10	(Slovakia)	Ivan Turan	2006–2008 inclusive	269

=== Top ten points to game ratio ===
League, Cup & Play Offs; as at end of 2021/22 Season (Players with under 20 appearances not included)

Player
No.	Nat.	Player	Active Seasons	Pts
1	(Slovakia)	Maros Stefanco	2010–2012 inclusive	1.65
2	(Czech Republic)	Jakub Klima	2016–2017	1.34
3	(Slovakia)	Michal Lauko	2008–2009	1.32
4	(England)	Ross Bowers	2010–2011 & 2015–2019	1.31
5	(Poland)	Piotr Poziomkowski	2013–2015 inclusive	1.18
6	(England)	Jamie Line	2010–2011 & 2014–2019	1.17
7	(England)	Mark Krater	2002–2004 & 2005–2008	1.07
8	(England)	Michael Knights	2003–2006 & 2007–2011	1.04
9	(England)	Tom Hurley	2004–2008 inclusive	1.02
10	(Czech Republic)	Tom Rubes	2018–2019	1.00
10	(Latvia)	Maksims Petruks	2012–2014 inclusive	1.00

=== Top ten goals to game ratio ===
League, Cup & Play Offs; as at end of 2021/22 Season (Players with under 20 appearances not included)

Player
No.	Nat.	Player	Active Seasons	Gls
1	(Slovakia)	Maros Stefanco	2010–2012 inclusive	0.93
2	(Czech Republic)	Jakub Klima	2016–2017	0.79
3	(England)	Jamie Holland	2009–2010	0.74
4	(England)	Ross Bowers	2010–2011 & 2015–2019	0.66
5	(Slovakia)	Michel Lauko	2008–2009	0.64
6	(Latvia)	Maksims Petruks	2012–2014 inclusive	0.57
7	(Czech Republic)	Tom Rubes	2018–2019	0.55
7	(Poland)	Piotr Poziomkowski	2013–2015 inclusive	0.55
9	(England)	Josh Nicklin	2008–2010 & 2014–2016	0.53
10	(England)	Tom Hurley	2004–2008 inclusive	0.52
10	(England)	Jamie Line	2010–2011 & 2014–2019	0.52

=== Top ten assists to game ratio ===
League, Cup & Play Offs; as at end of 2021/22 Season (Players with under 20 appearances not included)

Player
No.	Nat.	Player	Active Seasons	Ast
1	(England)	Cameron Wynn	2016–2017	0.80
2	(Slovakia)	Maros Stefanco	2010–2012 inclusive	0.73
3	(Slovakia)	Michel Lauko	2008–2009	0.68
4	(England)	Ross Bowers	2010–2011 & 2015–2019	0.65
4	(England)	Jamie Line	2010–2011 & 2014–2019	0.65
6	(Poland)	Piotr Poziomkowski	2013–2015 inclusive	0.63
7	(England)	Michael Knights	2003–2006 & 2007–2011	0.62
8	(Czech Republic)	Jakub Klima	2016–2017	0.56
8	(England)	Mark Krater	2002–2004 & 2005–2008	0.56
10	(England)	Mark Conway	2002–2004	0.55
10	(England)	Tom Carlon	2017–2019 & 2021–2022	0.55

=== Top ten penalty minutes to games ratio ===
League, Cup & Play Offs; as at end of 2021/22 Season (Players with under 20 appearances not included)

Player
No.	Nat.	Player	Active Seasons	PIM
1	(Slovakia)	Ivan Turan	2006–2008 inclusive	7.08
2	(England)	Richard Munnelly	2002–2004 inclusive	5.78
3	(England)	Michael Knights	2003–2006 & 2007–2011	5.19
4	(England)	Matthew Roberts	2002–2003, 2004–2014 & 2015–2016	5.17
5	(England)	Lee Featherstone	2002–2008 & 2009–2012	4.49
6	(England)	James Roberts	2002–2009 inclusive	4.08
7	(Finland)	Antti Kohvakka	2019–2022 inclusive	4.07
8	(England)	Zac Chamberlain	2019–2021 inclusive	3.17
9	(England)	Jacob Corson-Heron	2008–2011 inclusive	3.16
10	(England)	Paul Jamieson	2002–2011 inclusive	3.14

=== Top ten save percentages ===
League, Cup & Play Offs; as at end of 2021/22 Season (Players with under 20 appearances not included)

Player
No.	Nat.	Player	Active Seasons	Sv%
1	(England)	Damien King	2014–2016 inclusive	92.24
2	(England)	Jordan Lawday	2018–2019	90.19
3	(England)	Tom Annetts	2017–2019 inclusive	89.91
4	(England)	Denis Bell	2013–2014	88.96
5	(England)	David Wride	2016–2017	88.94
6	(England)	Mark Woolf	2002–2014 & 2015–2018	88.91
7	(England)	Jordan Hedley	2012–2013	88.17
8	(England)	Graham Laverick	2019–2021 inclusive	87.91
9	(England)	David Cassidy	2010–2014 inclusive	85.61
10	(England)	Kim Taylor	2003–2008 inclusive	81.81

=== Retired Numbers ===
Player
Number	Nat.	Player	Active Seasons	Acquired
1	(England)	Mark Woolf	2002–2014 & 2015–2018	2002 from Milton Keynes Kings

=== Season-by-season record ===
Milton Keynes Thunder season-by-season record

Season	League	GP	W	OTW	T	OTL	L	PTS	GF	GA	League Position
2001–02	ENIHL South	18	8	N/A	1	N/A	9	17	77	102	6th
2002–03	ENIHL South	20	8	N/A	2	N/A	10	18	77	76	4th
2003–04	ENIHL South	16	9	N/A	2	N/A	5	20	62	42	3rd
2004–05	ENIHL South	18	7	N/A	4	N/A	7	18	51	66	5th
2005–06	ENIHL South	20	8	N/A	4	N/A	8	20	84	74	6th
2006–07	ENIHL South	22	5	N/A	4	N/A	15	14	79	99	9th
2007–08	ENIHL South A	16	9	N/A	2	N/A	5	20	67	50	4th
2008–09	ENIHL South 1	28	7	N/A	5	N/A	16	19	73	114	7th
2009–10	ENIHL South 1	36	6	N/A	3	N/A	27	15	107	228	8th
2010–11	ENIHL South 1	40	14	N/A	4	N/A	22	32	147	192	7th
2011–12	ENIHL South 1	36	7	N/A	4	N/A	25	18	105	216	8th
2012–13	NIHL South 1	32	6	N/A	1	N/A	25	13	130	179	8th
2013–14	NIHL South 1	32	3	N/A	1	N/A	28	7	78	233	9th
2014–15	NIHL South 1	36	16	N/A	5	N/A	15	37	127	118	6th
2015–16	NIHL South 1	36	14	N/A	2	N/A	20	30	127	149	7th
2016–17	NIHL South 1	28	9	N/A	2	N/A	17	20	91	125	7th
2017–18	NIHL South 1	31	6	3	N/A	6	16	25	74	120	7th
2018–19	NIHL South 1	42	2	2	N/A	1	31	21	102	179	7th
2019–20	NIHL South 1	36	3	2	N/A	1	27	11	64	216	10th
2021–22	NIHL South 1	32	2	2	N/A	1	27	9	101	236	9th
2024–25	NIHL South 1	36	1	0	N/A	0	34	3	53	291	10th

Note: GP = Games played; W = Wins; OTW = Overtime Wins; OTL = Overtime Losses; L = Losses; T = Ties; PTS = Points; GF = Goals For; GA = Goals Against

== Associated teams ==
- Milton Keynes Lightning
- Milton Keynes Storm
- Milton Keynes Hurricanes
