= Milton Keynes Lightning =

Ice hockey team from Buckinghamshire, England

- City: Milton Keynes, Buckinghamshire
- League: NIHL
- Division: National League
- Founded: 1st franchise 2002, 2nd franchise 2019
- Home arena: Planet Ice Arena Milton Keynes
- Colors: Black, Grey & Gold
- Owner: Let's Play Hockey Consortium
- Head coach: Pete Russell
- Captain: James Griffin (England)
- Affiliates: Milton Keynes Thunder; Milton Keynes Storm
- Website: mk-lightning.co.uk

Franchise history
- 2002–2019, 2019–present: Milton Keynes Lightning

The Milton Keynes Lightning are an ice hockey team founded in 2002 and then again in 2019 in Milton Keynes, Buckinghamshire. The Lightning (2nd franchise) currently play in Britain's second-tier professional league, the National Ice Hockey League (NIHL), since the 2019–20 season. The Lightning (1st franchise) previously turned up in the top tier Elite Ice Hockey League (EIHL) from 2017–2019, and the tier-3/tier-2 English Premier Ice Hockey League (EPIHL) from 2002–2017. Their home rink is 2,200-seat Planet Ice Arena Milton Keynes, known locally as the MK Arena or the Thunderdome.

== Club history ==
=== Foundation ===
Founded in 2002, MK Lightning moved into the empty space left by the departure of the Milton Keynes Kings. The MK Kings were involved in a dispute with rink operators Planet Ice, which led to their relocation to Solihull in May 2002. There they became the Solihull MK Kings before being wound up in April 2003, after a single season.

=== 2002–2006: The early years ===
The demise of the Ice Hockey Superleague in 2002/03 led to major restructuring of Ice Hockey in the UK. The Milton Keynes Lightning became a founding member of the new Elite Ice Hockey League but competed in the lower English Premier Ice Hockey League. The first Lightning squad was made up mainly of young local players, one Finnish import, Mikko Skinnari and three Canadian imports, Nick Poole as Player Coach, Claude Dumas, and Dwayne Newman. Lightning finished their maiden season in 2nd place, behind Peterborough Phantoms. The two teams met again in the playoff final, with Lightning winning. A rivalry quickly grew between them as they continued to dominate EPL Ice Hockey, MK Lightning were crowned league champions in 2003–04 and 2004–05 as well as dominating the Playoffs until 2006. During this period there was a heavy reliance on Player Coach Nick Poole and Telford born Gary Clarke for points scoring.

=== 2006–2008: League struggle ===
The 2006–07 season saw Lightning struggle for the first time. A lack of quality new players, core older players leaving, predictable tactics and an improved opposition being the main drivers. The team ended the season in 5th place and were eliminated from the Playoffs in the first round. 2007/08 saw the situation worsen, with a league finish of 6th. This resulted in a roster overhaul for the new season.

=== 2008–2010: Return to success ===
The Lightning squad for the 2008–09 season included several experienced ex-Elite League players, young British talent and new European imports including Lukas Zatopek, Andre Smulter and Joakim Wiklander as an injury replacement for Ales Perez whose career was ended by a serious shoulder injury. After a slow start the team dominated the second half of the season and finished runners-up behind Peterborough. They then met again in the playoff final with the Phantoms winning the encounter. Lightning became the team to beat in 2009–10, despite Elite league Basingstoke Bison and Manchester Phoenix joining the EPIHL. Further squad strengthening in the form of former AIK player Monir Kalgoum and the addition of netminder Alex Mettam helped Lightning dominate and a home win against Swindon Wildcats in March 2010 saw the EPIHL league trophy return to Milton Keynes.

=== 2010–2015: Near misses, unexpected changes and disappointment ===
Despite the addition of Slovenian International Blaz Emersic, an inconsistent 2010–11 season saw Lightning finish 5th in the league and lose the play off final to Guildford Flames. 2011–12 fared no better, with the team again finishing 5th; having led the league in December. The team lost in the playoff quarter finals to eventual winners Slough Jets, despite taking a three-goal lead into the away leg. The 2012–13 season brought upheaval when just ten games into the season marque signing Adam Calder suffered a catastrophic hip injury which ended his career. Then in January 2013 Nick Poole who was by now considered a Milton Keynes Lightning legend unexpectedly announced his immediate retirement from playing. Lightning finished in 4th place and lost to Guildford Flames in the play off semi-finals.

The disruption continued in 2013–14 as home games were played in Coventry due to the renovation of the Milton Keynes rink. Due to a lack of practice ice time, the team struggled for consistency but finished in a credible 4th place. They were also the runners up to Basingstoke Bison in the cup. The 2014–15 season started with Lightning continuing to play out of Coventry. Indifferent early form left the team languishing near the bottom of the league. The refurbishment of the Milton Keynes rink was completed a month into the season and the first game back on home territory was played on 18 October 2014 against Sheffield Steeldogs in front of a capacity crowd of 2,500. Despite the return to home ice; Lightning continued to perform poorly. The loss of key players through roster changes and a series of injuries increased pressure on an already struggling team saw Lightning finish the season in 7th place, their lowest ever position. Despite poor league performances, Lightning defeated Guildford in the playoff quarter finals before losing to Manchester Phoenix in the semi-final game.

=== 2015–2017: Management change and new partnerships ===
At the end of the 2014–2015 season it was announced that head coach Nick Poole would take over the duties of General Manager from Vito Rausa and be replaced by Team GB coach Peter Russell. This was shortly followed by the announcement in May 2015 that Milton Keynes Lightning would be forming a partnership with Elite League side the Coventry Blaze. This partnership lasted just one season. The 2015–16 season also saw a change from the traditional white, black, and gold colours to a white, black, and blue combination which reflected the sponsorship of local company Smith Recycling. Despite a promising start, the season ended with MKL managing just a slight improvement on their previous years final position, finishing 5th. Lightning went on to qualify for the Play Off final, losing to Guildford Flames 6–2. At the end of the season it was also announced that from the start of the 2017–2018 season, Milton Keynes Lightning would play in the Elite Ice Hockey League.

In November 2016, Nick Poole stepped down from the role of General Manager, citing that he wanted to pursue new challenges with his family outside of hockey. Lightning secured a 2nd place league finish in their final EPL season and on 18 March 2017 won their first EPL cup in a penalty shootout against Peterborough. In the playoff campaign, Lightning finished 2nd in their group, winning 5 out of 6 games to qualify for the finals weekend. Lightning would then go on to win their 5th playoff title, beating Guildford 8–3 in the semi-final and then defeating Telford in the final 7–2.

=== 2017–2019: Elite League Hockey ===
Following the announcement in May 2015, Milton Keynes Lightning formally joined the Elite League for the 2017–2018 season. With this also came a change in ownership. Planet Ice, the Milton Keynes rink operators who had run the franchise since its temporary use of the Coventry Sky Dome during the 2013–2014 season sold the club to the Midlands-based husband and wife team of Graham and Monica Moody. Lightning's inaugural season in the Elite League had a promising start but poor away form and a series of disappointing results left them languishing near the bottom of the table at the turn of the new year. The situation worsened in January when US Import Matt Nickerson had his contract terminated after an altercation with a Guildford Flames fan when leaving the ice. In February 2018 it was announced that Coach Peter Russell would be leaving the club by mutual consent at the end of the season and replaced by Canadian Doug McKay. The team finished 11th in the league and outside of the play off places.

After a poor start to the 2018–19 season, with the team languishing at the bottom of the league, Doug McKay himself parted company with Milton Keynes Lightning in November 2018 citing 'personal reasons'. Coaching responsibilities initially passed to players Ryan Lannon and Tim Wallace, with Wallace taking sole charge for the remainder of the season in January 2019. In March 2019 it was announced that MK Lightning's two-year stay in the Elite League would come to an end and that from the 2019–2020 season the team would complete in the new National Hockey League, a two import league equivalent in the British ice hockey structure to the defunct English Premier Ice Hockey League (EPIHL). The reason behind this return to the second tier of UK Ice Hockey was financial. Lightning finished the season a disappointing 11th, 24 points behind 10th placed Dundee Stars.

=== 2019–2022: Back to its Milton Keynes roots and supporters ownership ===
Soon after the completion of the 2018–2019 season and the decision to leave the Elite League, Milton Keynes Lightning announced that Lewis Clifford would be the Head Coach for the inaugural season of the new NIHL National league. Clifford had been a stalwart of the Milton Keynes Thunder team, Assistant Coach to Nick Poole at Lightning and then Head Coach at Thunder. However, before the commencement of the season, preparations were thrown into disarray with revelations of unpaid wages/reimbursements for both former players and off ice staff, outstanding debts to suppliers and poor stewardship by the owners. This led to the majority of the club's sponsors publicly denouncing the situation and declining to provide further support.

The rink operators Planet Ice also decided not to award the ice contract for the 2019–2020 season to Graham and Monica Moody but to the Supporters-based consortium formally known as the Milton Keynes Ice Hockey Club and colloquially as 'Lets Play Hockey' for them to ice a team in the NIHL National League. This consortium had been set up after the announcement that Milton Keynes Lightning would no longer ice in the Elite League and had, with the backing of Planet Ice unsuccessfully applied to operate a Milton Keynes Elite League franchise for the 2019–20 season. Shortly after the announcement, the English Ice Hockey Association confirmed that the team under the management of the Lets Play Hockey consortium had been accepted into the new NIHL National League. Once confirmation of the league place had been made, clarification was provided that Lewis Clifford would continue to be the coach under the new ownership regime. The new owners also confirmed that the team would continue using the Milton Keynes Lightning name. The 2019/20 season ended prematurely due to the COVID-19 pandemic with the team sitting in sixth position.

With the restrictions placed upon the country due to the COVID-19 pandemic, the start of the 2020/21 season was delayed. However, Lightning participated in the Streaming Series along with Sheffield Steeldogs & Swindon Wildcats in November 2020 as part of the Return to Play programme. Full post pandemic league action commenced with the 2021/22 season. Lightning iced a strong side and whilst played some excellent hockey, failed to find the consistency required to challenge for the title. The team finished 5th after dropping off the pace with a few weeks remaining of the season. Following defeat to Sheffield Steeldogs in the play off final, it was announced that Lewis Clifford would be stepping down in his duel roles as General Manager & Head Coach following a management restructuring. He was replaced by player/Director of Hockey Development Tim Wallace, who returned for a second spell as Player/Coach.

== Arena redevelopment ==
In March 2013, Milton Keynes Council approved plans to redevelop the Leisure Plaza after failed attempts in 2006 & 2011. The development of the arena was funded by Morrisons Supermarkets and took 17 months to complete. This forced Lightning to play their home games at the Coventry Sky Dome during the 2013/2014 season & part of the 2014/2015 season. The team returned to the redeveloped rink which had been renamed the "MK Arena" on 18 October 2014 against Sheffield Steeldogs, in front of a sell out crowd in excess of 2,500.

== Club honours ==
- EPIHL League: 3

Winner (3): 2004, 2005, 2010
Runner-up (3): 2003, 2009, 2017

- EPIHL Playoffs: 5

Winner (5): 2003, 2004, 2005, 2006, 2017
Runner-up (3): 2009, 2011, 2016

- EPIHL Cup: 1

Winner (1): 2017
Runner-up (4): 2003, 2007, 2010, 2014

- NIHL Playoffs: 1

Winner (1): 2025
Runner-up (1): 2022

- NIHL Cup: 1

Winner (1): 2024
Runner-up (0)

== Club roster 2022–2023 ==
Netminders
No.	Nat.	Player	Catches	Date of birth	Place of birth	Acquired
1	(England)	Jordan Hedley	L	7 August 1996 (age 30)	Walsall, England	2022 from Coventry Blaze
31	(England)	Daniel Crowe	L	16 December 2003 (age 22)	Newcastle upon Tyne	2022 from Nashville Spartans (USA)

Defencemen
No.	Nat.	Player	Shoots	Date of birth	Place of birth	Acquired
3	(England)	Tyler Nixon	R	26 July 2001 (age 25)	Rotherham, England	2021 from Sheffield Scimitars
5	(England)	Ben Russell	R	24 March 1994 (age 32)	Milton Keynes, England	2019 from Streatham IHC
15	(England)	James Griffin	R	8 April 1993 (age 33)	Swindon, England	2015 from Coventry Blaze
19	(England)	Leigh Jamieson	R	30 July 1985 (age 41)	Milton Keynes, England	2019 from Streatham IHC
21	(England)	Ross Green	R	19 February 1992 (age 34)	Chelmsford, England	2019 from Milton Keynes Thunder
25	(England)	Ed Knaggs	L	13 June 1998 (age 28)	Hemel Hempstead, England	2020 from Bracknell Bees
33	(England)	Milique Martelly	L	5 June 2004 (age 22)	London, England	2021 from Streatham IHC
39	(England)	Sam Russell	R	10 August 2000 (age 26)	Milton Keynes, England	2019 from New England Wolves (USA)
66	(Scotland)	Lewis Christie	R	30 August 1989 (age 37)	Edinburgh, Scotland	2019 from Free Agent

Forwards
No.	Nat.	Player	Shoots	Date of birth	Place of birth	Acquired
7	(Latvia)	Deivids Sarkanis	L	7 November 1994 (age 31)	Riga, Latvia	2022 from HK Mogo (Latvia)
8	(England) (New Zealand)	Liam Stewart	L	4 September 1994 (age 32)	London, England	2019 from Skycity Stampede (New Zealand)
10	(England)	Bobby Chamberlain	R	16 March 1995 (age 31)	Hull, England	2020 from Hull Pirates
11	(England)	Callum Field	R	3 August 2004 (age 22)	Northampton, England	2020 from Sheffield Steelhawks JIHC
12	(England)	Zaine McKenzie	R	20 August 2003 (age 23)	Coventry, England	2022 Bees IHC
14	(England)	Hallden Barnes-Garner	R	28 February 1998 (age 28)	Milton Keynes, England	2019 from Milton Keynes Thunder
16	(Northern Ireland) (Canada)	Mack Stewart	L	18 August 2004 (age 22)	Belfast, Northern Ireland	2022 from Belfast Giants
23	(England)	Jack Hopkins	R	8 May 2004 (age 22)	Nottingham, England	2022 from Nottingham Panthers
28	(United States)	Tim Wallace	R	6 August 1984 (age 42)	Anchorage, Alaska, USA	2022 from Free Agent
86	(England) (Czech Republic)	Sean Norris	R	14 September 1999 (age 27)	Ascot, England	2021 from Basingstoke Bison
89	(England)	Rio Grinell-Parke	L	25 February 1999 (age 27)	London, England	2022 from Raiders IHC
98	(England)	Sam Talbot	R	10 April 2001 (age 25)	England	2021 from Basingstoke Bison

== Statistical records ==
=== Top ten appearances ===
League, Cup, Play Offs & Streaming Series Games; as at End of Season 2022

Player
No.	Nat.	Player	Active Seasons	App
1	(England)	Adam Carr	2003–2017 inclusive	687
2	(England)	Leigh Jamieson	2002–2004, 2009–2017 & 2019–2022	614
3	(Scotland)	Lewis Christie	2008–2017 & 2019–2022	581
4	(Scotland)	Grant McPherson	2006–2016 & 2019–2020	542
5	(Canada)	Nick Poole	2002–2015 inclusive	506
6	(England)	Ross Green	2008–2016 & 2019–2022	494
7	(England)	Ross Bowers	2002–2008, 2009–2010, 2011–2015 & 2019–2021	473
8	(England)	Michael Farn	2009–2017 & 2021-2022	439
9	(England)	Michael Wales	2003–2012 inclusive	385
10	(Slovenia)	Blaz Emersic	2010–2017 inclusive	382

=== Top ten points scorers ===
League, Cup, Play Offs & Streaming Series Games; as at End of Season 2022

Player
No.	Nat.	Player	Active Seasons	Pts
1	(England)	Gary Clarke	2002–2009 & 2010–2011	767
2	(Canada)	Nick Poole	2002–2015 inclusive	728
3	(England)	Leigh Jamieson	2002–2004, 2009–2017 & 2019–2022	554
4	(England)	Adam Carr	2003–2017 inclusive	524
5	(Slovenia)	Blaz Emersic	2010–2017 inclusive	398
6	(England)	Greg Randall	2002–2006 & 2007–2009	260
7	(England)	Michael Wales	2003–2012 inclusive	259
8	(Finland)	Mikko Skinnari	2002–2008 inclusive	246
9	(Finland)	Andre Smulter	2008–2011 inclusive	229
10	(England)	Lewis Hook	2014–2018 & 2020	226

=== Top ten goal scorers ===
League, Cup, Play Offs & Streaming Series Games; as at End of Season 2022

Player
No.	Nat.	Player	Active Seasons	Gls
1	(England)	Gary Clarke	2002–2009 & 2010–2011	436
2	(England)	Adam Carr	2003–2017 inclusive	248
3	(Canada)	Nick Poole	2002–2015 inclusive	211
4	(England)	Leigh Jamieson	2002–2004, 2009–2017 & 2019–2022	187
5	(Slovenia)	Blaz Emersic	2010–2017 inclusive	171
6	(Finland)	Andre Smulter	2008–2011 inclusive	111
7	(England)	Lewis Hook	2014–2018 & 2020	106
8	(England)	Ross Bowers	2002–2008, 2009–2010, 2011–2015 & 2019–2021	101
9	(England)	Greg Randall	2002–2006 & 2007–2009	98
10	(England)	Michael Wales	2003–2012 inclusive	96

=== Top ten goal assists ===
League, Cup, Play Offs & Streaming Series Games; as at End of Season 2022

Player
No.	Nat.	Player	Active Seasons	Ast
1	(Canada)	Nick Poole	2002–2015 inclusive	517
2	(England)	Leigh Jamieson	2002–2004, 2009–2017 & 2019–2022	367
3	(England)	Gary Clarke	2002–2009 & 2010–2011	331
4	(England)	Adam Carr	2003–2017 inclusive	276
5	(Slovenia)	Blaz Emersic	2010–2017 inclusive	227
6	(England)	Michael Farn	2009–2017 & 2021-2022	179
7	(England)	Michael Wales	2003–2012 inclusive	163
8	(England)	Greg Randall	2002–2006 & 2007–2009	162
9	(Finland)	Mikko Skinnari	2002–2008 inclusive	155
10	(Scotland)	Jordan Cownie	2013–2017 inclusive	142

=== Top ten penalty minutes ===
League, Cup, Play Offs & Streaming Series Games; as at End of Season 2022

Player
No.	Nat.	Player	Active Seasons	PIM
1	(Scotland)	Grant McPherson	2006–2016 & 2019–2020	1305
2	(England)	Michael Wales	2003–2012 inclusive	1131
3	(England)	Kurt Irvine	2003–2008 inclusive	1109
4	(England)	Leigh Jamieson	2002–2004, 2009–2017 & 2019–2022	1103
5	(Scotland)	Lewis Christie	2008–2017 & 2019–2022	699
6	(Czech Republic)	Lukáš Zátopek	2008–2014 inclusive	509
7	(England)	Ross Bowers	2002–2008, 2009–2010, 2011–2015 & 2019–2021	479
8	(Canada)	Nick Poole	2002–2015 inclusive	452
9	(England)	Matt Towalski	2005–2012 inclusive	446
10	(England)	Michael Farn	2009–2017 & 2021-2022	420

=== Top ten points to game ratio ===
League, Cup, Play Offs & Streaming Series Games; as at End of Season 2022 (Players with under 20 appearances not included)

Player
No.	Nat.	Player	Active Seasons	Pts
1	(England)	Gary Clarke	2002–2009 & 2010–2011	2.03
2	(Sweden)	Joakim Wiklander	2008–2010 inclusive	2.00
3	(Czech Republic)	Robin Kovar	2019-2020	1.86
4	(England)	Greg Owen	2002–2003	1.74
5	(Sweden)	Stefan Ketola	2005–2006	1.71
6	(Sweden)	Monir Kalgoum	2009–2011 inclusive	1.67
7	(Finland)	Andre Smulter	2008–2011 inclusive	1.58
8	(Finland)	Tony Alasaarela	2007–2008	1.50
9	(Slovakia)	Stan Lascek	2013–2015 inclusive	1.45
9	(Canada)	Steve Moria	2005-2006	1.45
9	(Finland)	Antti Holli	2016–2017	1.45

=== Top ten goals to game ratio ===
League, Cup, Play Offs & Streaming Series Games; as at End of Season 2022 (Players with under 20 appearances not included)

Player
No.	Nat.	Player	Active Seasons	Gls
1	(England)	Gary Clarke	2002–2009 & 2010–2011	1.16
2	(England)	Greg Owen	2002–2003	1.10
3	(Sweden)	Stefan Ketola	2005–2006	0.86
4	(England) (New Zealand)	Liam Stewart	2019–2022 inclusive	0.80
5	(Finland)	Andre Smulter	2008–2011 inclusive	0.77
5	(Slovakia)	Stanislav Lascek	2013–2015 inclusive	0.77
7	(Czech Republic)	Milan Kostourek	2014–2015	0.75
8	(Czech Republic)	Robin Kovar	2019-2020	0.73
9	(England)	Sam Talbot	2021–2022	0.70
10	(Czech Republic)	Kamil Tvrdek	2012–2013	0.65

=== Top ten assists to game ratio ===
League, Cup, Play Offs & Streaming Series Games; as at End of Season 2022 (Players with under 20 appearances not included)

Player
No.	Nat.	Player	Active Seasons	Ast
1	(Sweden)	Joakim Wiklander	2008–2010 inclusive	1.59
2	(Czech Republic)	Robin Kovar	2019–2020	1.14
3	(Sweden)	Monir Kalgoum	2009–2011 inclusive	1.06
4	(Canada)	Nick Poole	2002–2015 inclusive	1.02
5	(Finland)	Tony Alasaarela	2007–2008	0.98
5	(Finland)	Antti Hölli	2016–2017	0.98
7	(Finland)	Markku Tathinen	2015–2016	0.91
8	(Czech Republic)	Ales Perez	2007–2009 inclusive	0.89
8	(Canada)	Francis Verreault-Paul	2017–2018	0.89
10	(England)	Gary Clarke	2002-2009 & 2010-2011	0.88

=== Top ten penalty minutes to games ratio ===
League, Cup, Play Offs & Streaming Series Games; as at End of Season 2022 (Players with under 20 appearances not included)

Player
No.	Nat.	Player	Active Seasons	PIM
1	(England)	Kurt Irvine	2003–2008 inclusive	5.38
2	(United States)	Matt Nickerson	2017–2018	4.77
3	(England)	James Morgan	2006–2007	4.30
4	(Canada)	Steve Carpenter	2004–2005	4.06
5	(Czech Republic)	Frankisek Bakrlik	2015–2017 inclusive	3.63
6	(England)	Daniel Croft	2007–2008	3.59
7	(Canada)	Francis Verreault-Paul	2017–2018	3.23
8	(England)	Michael Wales	2003–2012 inclusive	2.94
9	(Czech Republic)	Tomáš Káňa	2019–2020	2.83
10	(England)	Michael Knights	2002-2003, 2004-2005 & 2006-2007	2.73

=== Top ten save percentages ===
League, Cup, Play Offs & Streaming Series Games; as at End of Season 2022 (Players with under 20 appearances not included)

Player
No.	Nat.	Player	Active Seasons	Sav
1	(Poland)	Prezemyslaw Odrobny	2016–2017	92.35
2	(England)	Alex Mettam	2009–2013 inclusive	91.65
3	(Scotland)	Jordan Marr	2015–2016	91.47
4	(England)	Barry Hollyhead	2002–2004 & 2006–2012	91.27
5	(England)	Stephen Wall	2012–2015 inclusive	91.13
6	(England)	Allen Sutton	2002–2008 inclusive	90.97
7	(Sweden) (Finland)	Miika Wiikman	2017–2018	90.22
8	(England)	Lee Lansdowne	2005–2006	90.20
9	(England)	Dean Skinns	2015–2016 & 2019–2020	90.08
10	(Canada)	Patrick Killeen	2018–2019	89.52

=== NHL drafted Milton Keynes Lightning players ===
Player
Nat.	Player.	Active Seasons	Year Drafted	Round & Draft Pick	Team
(Canada)	Claude Dumas	2002–2003	1985	Round 5 Draft Pick 103	Washington Capitals
(Finland)	Janne Jokila	2012–2014 inclusive	2000	Round 7 Draft Pick 200	Columbus Blue Jackets
(Finland)	Martti Järventie	2015–2016	2001	Round 4 Draft Pick 109	Montreal Canadiens
(Czech Republic)	Robin Kovář	2019–2020	2002	Round 4 Draft Pick 123	Edmonton Oilers
(United States)	Ryan Lannon	2018–2019	2002	Round 8 Draft Pick 239	Pittsburgh Penguins
(United States)	Matt Nickerson	2017–2018	2003	Round 3 Draft Pick 99	Dallas Stars
(Sweden)	Andreas Valdix	2018–2019	2003	Round 4 Draft Pick 109	Washington Capitals
(Slovakia)	Juraj Gráčik	2011–2012	2004	Round 5 Draft Pick 142	Atlanta Thrashers
(Slovakia)	Stanislav Lascek	2013–2015 inclusive	2005	Round 5 Draft Pick 133	Tampa Bay Lightning
(Czech Republic)	Tomáš Káňa	2019–2020	2006	Round 2 Draft Pick 31	St Louis Blues
(Canada)	Patrick Killeen	2018–2019	2008	Round 6 Draft Pick 180	Pittsburgh Penguins
(United States)	Paul Phillips	2017–2018	2009	Round 7 Draft Pick 195	Chicago Blackhawks
(United States)	Christian Isackson	2017–2018	2010	Round 7 Draft Pick 203	Buffalo Sabres
(United States)	Robbie Baillargeon	2018–2019	2012	Round 5 Draft Pick 136	Ottawa Senators

=== Retired numbers ===
Player
Number	Nat.	Player	Active Seasons	Acquired
91	(Canada)	Nick Poole	2002–2015 inclusive	2002 from Fife Flyers
18	(England)	Adam Carr	2003–2017 inclusive	2003 from Isle of Wight Raiders
9	(Scotland)	Grant McPherson	2006–2017 & 2019–2020	2006 from Edinburgh Capitals

=== Head coaches ===
Coach
Nat.	Coach	Active Seasons	Acquired
(Canada)	Nick Poole	2002–2015 inclusive (Player-Head Coach 2002–2013, Head Coach 2013–2015)	n/a First Head Coach Position
(Scotland)	Peter Russell	2015–2018 inclusive	2015 from Okanagan Hockey Academy
(Canada)	Doug McKay	2018	2018 from Orlik Opole (Poland)
(United States)	Ryan Lannon	2018–2019 (Joint Player-Head Coach 2018–2019)	n/a First Head Coach Position
(United States)	Tim Wallace	2018–2019 (Joint Player-Head Coach 2018–2019, Player-Head Coach 2019)	n/a First Head Coach Position
(England)	Lewis Clifford	2019–2022	2019 from Milton Keynes Thunder
(United States)	Tim Wallace	2022 (Player-Head Coach)	2022 from Nottingham Panthers

=== Club captains ===
Captain
Nat.	Captain	Active Seasons as Captain	Acquired
(Canada)	Dwayne Newman	2002–2007 (Career with club 2002–2007 inclusive)	2002 from Solihull MK Kings
(England)	Gary Clarke	2007–2009 (Career with club 2002–2009 & 2010–2011)	2002 from Basingstoke Bison & 2010 Guildford Flames
(England)	Adam Carr	2009–2017 (Career with club 2003–2017 inclusive)	2003 from Isle of Wight Raiders
(Canada)	Kevin King	2017–2018 (Career with club 2017–2018)	2017 from Rapaces de Gap
(United States)	Tim Wallace	2018–2019 (Career with club 2018–2019 & 2022)	2018 from Sheffield Steelers
(Canada) (United Kingdom)	Russell Cowley	2019–2022(Career with club 2019–2022)	2019 from Basingstoke Bison
(Scotland)	Lewis Christie	2022– (Career with club 2008-2017 & 2019–)	2019 from Free Agent

== Season-by-season record ==
Milton Keynes Lightning season-by-season record

Season	League	GP	W	T	L	OTL	PTS	GF	GA	League Position
2002–03	English Premier Ice Hockey League	42	34	3	5	–	62	269	113	2nd
2003–04	English Premier Ice Hockey League	32	28	2	5	–	56	175	87	1st
2004–05	English Premier Ice Hockey League	32	23	3	6	–	49	149	75	1st
2005–06	English Premier Ice Hockey League	48	25	10	13	–	60	201	121	3rd
2006–07	English Premier Ice Hockey League	44	28	2	14	–	58	187	132	5th
2007–08	English Premier Ice Hockey League	40	22	–	16	2	46	160	121	6th
2008–09	English Premier Ice Hockey League	54	34	–	14	6	74	221	149	2nd
2009–10	English Premier Ice Hockey League	54	42	–	10	2	86	218	144	1st
2010–11	English Premier Ice Hockey League	54	31	–	21	2	64	219	160	5th
2011–12	English Premier Ice Hockey League	54	32	–	20	2	66	176	145	5th
2012–13	English Premier Ice Hockey League	54	32	–	20	2	66	170	145	4th
2013–14	English Premier Ice Hockey League	54	30	–	20	4	64	198	181	4th
2014–15	English Premier Ice Hockey League	48	18	–	24	6	42	152	186	7th
2015–16	English Premier Ice Hockey League	54	26	–	17	5	69	197	150	5th
2016–17	English Premier Ice Hockey League	48	34	–	11	3	71	174	124	2nd
2017–18	Elite Ice Hockey League	56	20	–	34	2	42	175	234	11th
2018–19	Elite Ice Hockey League	60	15	–	41	4	34	148	246	11th
2019–20	National Ice Hockey League	50	22	–	20	6	54	201	205	6th
2021–22	National Ice Hockey League	48	25	–	19	4	54	197	195	5th

Note: GP = Games played; W = Wins; L = Losses; T = Ties; OTL = Overtime Losses; PTS = Points; GF = Goals For; GA = Goals Against

== Associated teams ==
- Milton Keynes Thunder
- Milton Keynes Storm

Preceded by Guildford Flames	EPIHL Playoff Champions; 2016–2017	Succeeded by n/a
Preceded by Peterborough Phantoms	EPIHL Champions; 2009–2010	Succeeded by Manchester Phoenix
Preceded by Guildford Flames	EPIHL Cup Winners; 2016–2017	Succeeded by n/a
