= Milan Kostourek =

Czech ice hockey forward

- Born: January 9, 1983 (age 42); České Budějovice, Czechoslovakia
- Height: 5 ft 9 in (175 cm)
- Weight: 157 lb (71 kg; 11 st 3 lb)
- Position: Forward
- Shoots: Left
- 2. národní liga team; Former teams: Piráti Chomutov; HC České Budějovice; HK 36 Skalica; PSG Berani Zlín; Cracovia Krakow
- Playing career: 2001–present

Milan Kostourek (born January 9, 1983) is a Czech professional ice hockey forward playing for Piráti Chomutov of the 2. národní liga.

Kostourek previously played in the Czech Extraliga for HC České Budějovice and PSG Berani Zlín, playing in fourteen regular season games and eight playoff games respectively. He also played in the Tipsport Liga for HK 36 Skalica and the Polska Hokej Liga for Cracovia Krakow.
