= Ryan Lannon =

American ice hockey player (born 1982)

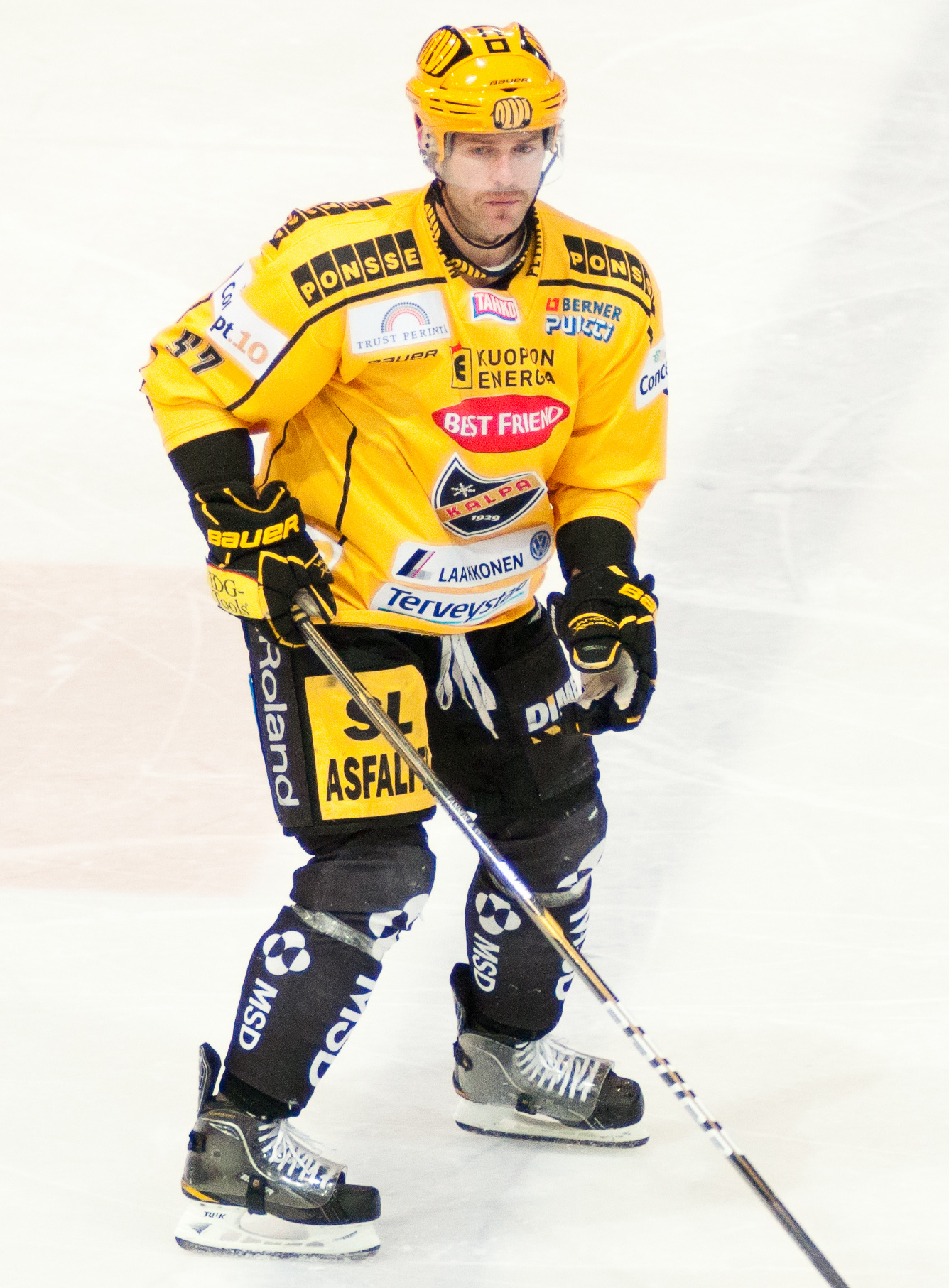
- Born: December 14, 1982 (age 43) Grafton, Massachusetts, U.S.
- Height: 6 ft 2 in (188 cm)
- Weight: 220 lb (100 kg; 15 st 10 lb)
- Position: Defense
- Shot: Left
- Liiga team Former teams: Vaasan Sport; Milton Keynes Lightning; Wilkes-Barre/Scranton Penguins; San Antonio Rampage; Houston Aeros; Lake Erie Monsters; Worcester Sharks; KalPa Kuopio; Graz 99ers
- NHL draft: 239th overall, 2002; Pittsburgh Penguins
- Playing career: 2005–2013; 2017–2019

Ryan Lannon (born December 14, 1982) is an American former professional ice hockey defenseman who last played for Vaasan Sport in the Liiga (Finnish Elite League).

== Playing career ==
As a defensive-defenseman, Ryan was first selected to play with the U.S. National Development Team Program in the NAHL in the 1998–99 season. After one season Lannon left the development program and played two seasons of high school hockey in Massachusetts with Cushing Academy Penguins.

Lannon attended Harvard University and played collegiate hockey in the ECAC from 2001 until 2005. After his freshman season, Ryan was drafted in the eighth round, 239th overall, by the Pittsburgh Penguins in the 2002 NHL entry draft, joining fellow Harvard teammate and childhood friend, Noah Welch as a Penguins prospect. Lannon scored 4 goals and had 34 assists for 38 points and missed only two games throughout his college career as he helped the Crimsons win the ECAC in 2002 and 2004.

As a stay-at-home defenseman, he ranked in the top three in Plus/minus in all four of his seasons with Harvard and in his senior year was named U.S Hockey Onlines "Unsung Hero", Harvards Raplh "Cooney" Weiland Award as the team's most spirited, selfless player and earned selection to the Second All-Ivy team. On August 3, 2005, Lannon was then signed, alongside Noah Welch, by the Penguins to a two-year entry-level contract.

Lannon was assigned to Pittsburgh's AHL affiliate, the Wilkes-Barre/Scranton Penguins, for the entirety of his entry-level contract, helping the "Baby Pens" to the Calder Cup playoffs in each season. He then re-signed with the Penguins on a one-year deal on July 27, 2007. In the following 2007–08 season, Lannon received his first NHL recall on January 6, 2008. However, after traveling with Pittsburgh for two weeks he failed to make his Penguins debut and was returned to the Baby Pens on January 20, 2008. In 75 regular season games with Wilkes-Barre/Scranton, he scored 3 goals and 13 points and as a leader on the Penguins defense he scored 7 points in 23 post-season games before suffering defeat in the Calder Cup finals.

After three years with the Penguins, he signed as a free agent with the Phoenix Coyotes on July 15, 2008, and was later assigned to the San Antonio Rampage of the AHL. On October 16, 2008, he was recalled to the Coyotes but with two games as a healthy scratch was again unable to make his NHL debut after he was reassigned to the Rampage on October 19. Remaining with the Rampage for the remainder of the season, Ryan compiled only 5 assists in 63 games but contributed to the San Antonio community off the ice to win the team's Man of the Year Award and nominee for the AHL's Yanick Dupre Memorial Award.

On July 23, 2009, Lannon signed as a free agent to a one-year contract by the Minnesota Wild. He was then assigned to AHL affiliate, the Houston Aeros for the 2009–10 season. Shortly after appearing in his 300th career AHL game on December 15, 2009, Ryan was injured and subsequently only played in 27 games for the year, recording a goal and an assist.

Once again a free agent at season's end, Lannon was invited to the Philadelphia Flyers training camp prior to the 2010–11 season, before he was later released on September 26, 2010. On December 4, 2010, he was signed to a professional try-out contract with the Lake Erie Monsters of the AHL. After 7 games with the Monsters, Lannon was released and briefly joined the Worcester Sharks before leaving for Europe to sign with Finnish team, KalPa of the SM-liiga, on January 27, 2011. After impressing in 15 games with KalPa, Lannon was signed to a one-year contract extension on March 16, 2011.

On September 20, 2012, Lannon accepted a try-out to move to the Austrian Hockey League with the Graz 99ers. He remained with the club for duration of the 2012–13 season, posting 7 assists in 49 games. Despite the option to return to previous club, KalPa, with a lingering back injury Lannon opted to retire from professional hockey on April 18, 2013.

After a four-year retirement, Lannon made a surprising comeback to professional hockey for the 2017–18 season in signing an ECHL contract with inaugural hometown club, the Worcester Railers on October 4, 2017. He opened the season with the Railers, appearing in 4 scoreless games, before he was released from his contract on November 11, 2017. Lannon was signed as a free agent to continue in the ECHL with the Atlanta Gladiators on November 21, 2017.

In the following off-season, Lannon continued his comeback in returning abroad to sign a one-year deal with English club, Milton Keynes Lightning of the EIHL on July 25, 2018. He left in the middle of the season to join Finland’s Vaasan Sport due to the Milton Keynes Lightning’s financial issues.

== Career statistics ==
| | | | Regular season | | | | | Playoffs |
| Season | Team | League | GP | G | A | Pts | PIM | GP | G | A | Pts | PIM |
|---|---|---|---|---|---|---|---|---|---|---|---|---|
| 1997–98 | Saint Sebastian's School | HS Prep |
| 1998–99 | US NTDP U18 | NAHL | 56 | 3 | 4 | 7 | 36 | — | — | — | — | — |
| 1999–2000 | Cushing Academy | HS Prep |
| 2000–01 | Cushing Academy | HS Prep |
| 2001–02 | Harvard University | ECAC | 34 | 0 | 2 | 2 | 38 | — | — | — | — | — |
| 2002–03 | Harvard University | ECAC | 34 | 3 | 11 | 14 | 39 | — | — | — | — | — |
| 2003–04 | Harvard University | ECAC | 35 | 0 | 9 | 9 | 36 | — | — | — | — | — |
| 2004–05 | Harvard University | ECAC | 33 | 1 | 12 | 13 | 34 | — | — | — | — | — |
| 2005–06 | Wilkes–Barre/Scranton Penguins | AHL | 74 | 2 | 8 | 10 | 65 | 11 | 0 | 0 | 0 | 8 |
| 2006–07 | Wilkes–Barre/Scranton Penguins | AHL | 68 | 0 | 19 | 19 | 71 | 11 | 0 | 2 | 2 | 14 |
| 2007–08 | Wilkes–Barre/Scranton Penguins | AHL | 75 | 3 | 10 | 13 | 29 | 23 | 1 | 6 | 7 | 2 |
| 2008–09 | San Antonio Rampage | AHL | 63 | 0 | 5 | 5 | 33 | — | — | — | — | — |
| 2009–10 | Houston Aeros | AHL | 27 | 1 | 1 | 2 | 8 | — | — | — | — | — |
| 2010–11 | Lake Erie Monsters | AHL | 7 | 0 | 1 | 1 | 12 | — | — | — | — | — |
| 2010–11 | Worcester Sharks | AHL | 4 | 0 | 1 | 1 | 4 | — | — | — | — | — |
| 2010–11 | KalPa | SM-l | 15 | 0 | 1 | 1 | 4 | 7 | 0 | 0 | 0 | 4 |
| 2011–12 | KalPa | SM-l | 28 | 1 | 5 | 6 | 10 | — | — | — | — | — |
| 2012–13 | Graz 99ers | EBEL | 49 | 0 | 7 | 7 | 20 | 5 | 0 | 0 | 0 | 2 |
| 2017–18 | Worcester Railers | ECHL | 4 | 0 | 0 | 0 | 0 | — | — | — | — | — |
| 2017–18 | Atlanta Gladiators | ECHL | 48 | 3 | 3 | 6 | 29 | 1 | 0 | 1 | 1 | 0 |
| 2018–19 | Milton Keynes Lightning | EIHL | 35 | 0 | 2 | 2 | 18 | — | — | — | — | — |
| 2018–19 | Sport | Liiga | 10 | 1 | 0 | 1 | 2 | — | — | — | — | — |
| AHL totals | | | 317 | 6 | 45 | 51 | 222 | 45 | 1 | 8 | 9 | 24 |
| SM-l/Liiga totals | | | 53 | 2 | 6 | 8 | 16 | 7 | 0 | 0 | 0 | 4 |
