= Kevin Kantee =

American-born Finnish ice hockey player

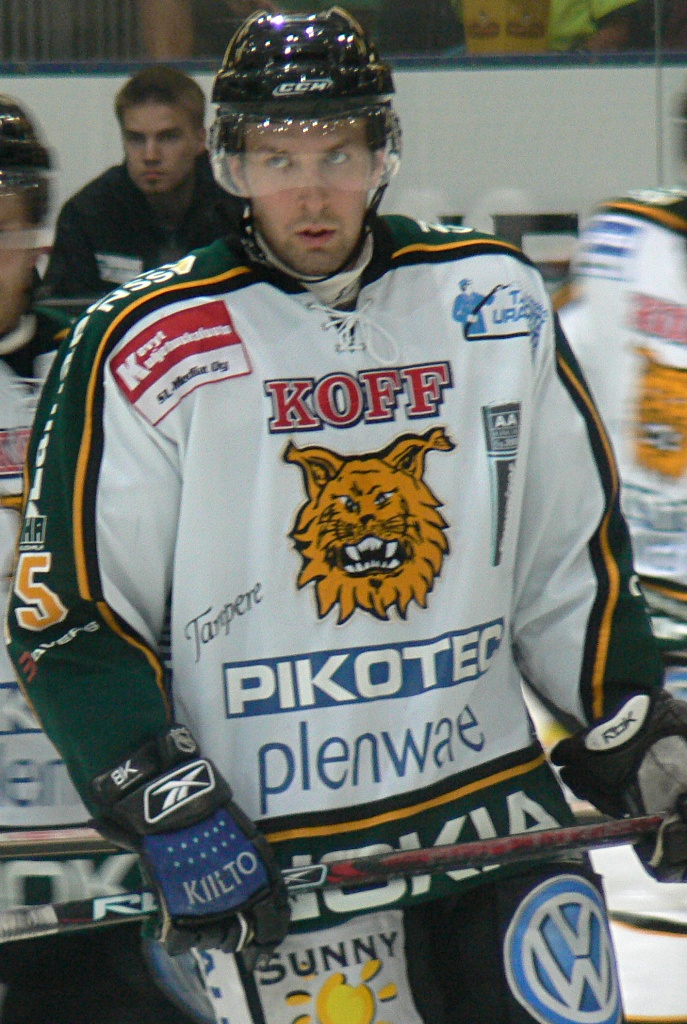
- Born: January 29, 1984 (age 42) Idaho Falls, Idaho, U.S.
- Height: 187 cm (6 ft 2 in)
- Weight: 95 kg (209 lb; 14 st 13 lb)
- Position: Defence
- Shot: Left
- Serie A team Former teams: HC Valpellice; AUT; HDD Olimpija Ljubljana; SM-liiga; JYP; Ilves; TPS; Jokerit
- NHL draft: 188th overall, 2002; Chicago Blackhawks
- Playing career: 2003–2012

Kevin Kantee (born January 29, 1984) is an American born Finnish professional ice hockey defenceman. He was drafted by the Chicago Blackhawks as their sixth-round pick, #188 overall, in the 2002 NHL entry draft. He played for Jokerit, TPS, Ilves and JYP in the Finnish SM-liiga 2003–2010, and transferred to HDD Olimpija Ljubljana in the Austrian Hockey League for the 2010–2011 season. He is currently signed with HC Valpellice in the Italian Serie A.

Kantee was born to Finnish parents in Idaho Falls, Idaho, U.S., and holds dual citizenship of Finland and the U.S.

In an incident on October 27, 2007, Kantee was attacked by Ässät defenceman Matt Nickerson in the locker room corridor in the Ässät arena after an Ilves-Ässät game. Nickerson was already serving a prior suspension, and was suspended for five more games as a result of the incident.

== Career statistics ==
=== Regular season and playoffs ===
			Regular season					Playoffs
Season	Team	League	GP	G	A	Pts	PIM	GP	G	A	Pts	PIM
1999–2000	Jokerit	FIN U18	13	0	2	2	6	—	—	—	—	—
2000–01	Jokerit	FIN U18	34	10	8	18	16	—	—	—	—	—
2001–02	Jokerit	FIN U18	1	2	0	2	12	5	2	1	3	0
2001–02	Jokerit	FIN U20	34	2	7	9	16	—	—	—	—	—
2002–03	Jokerit	FIN U20	34	5	17	22	34	11	3	4	7	16
2003–04	Jokerit	FIN U20	26	1	17	18	38	3	0	0	0	0
2003–04	Jokerit	SM-liiga	19	0	1	1	4	8	0	1	1	2
2003–04	Suomi U20	Mestis	7	0	3	3	2	—	—	—	—	—
2004–05	Jokerit	FIN U20	11	3	11	14	4	—	—	—	—	—
2004–05	Jokerit	SM-liiga	46	0	3	3	14	12	0	0	0	0
2005–06	Jokerit	SM-liiga	45	1	2	3	32	—	—	—	—	—
2006–07	Jokerit	SM-liiga	41	1	4	5	12	—	—	—	—	—
2006–07	TPS	SM-liiga	11	0	1	1	6	2	0	0	0	0
2007–08	Ilves	SM-liiga	55	3	7	10	28	9	1	2	3	4
2008–09	Ilves	SM-liiga	57	0	4	4	18	3	0	0	0	0
2009–10	JYP	SM-liiga	29	0	2	2	20	—	—	—	—	—
2009–10	D Team	Mestis	2	0	0	0	2	—	—	—	—	—
2010–11	HDD Olimpija Ljubljana	AUT	47	1	8	9	40	4	0	0	0	0
2010–11	HDD Olimpija Ljubljana	SVN	—	—	—	—	—	4	0	0	0	12
2011–12	HC Valpellice	ITA	35	1	7	8	18	5	0	0	0	0
SM-liiga totals			303	5	24	29	134	34	1	3	4	6

=== International ===
Year	Team	Event	GP	G	A	Pts	PIM
2002	Finland	WJC18	8	1	3	4	4
2004	Finland	WJC	7	0	1	1	4
Junior totals			15	1	4	5	8
