= Wightlink Raiders =

- City: Ryde, Isle of Wight, England
- Founded: 1991
- Folded: 2016
- Colours: White, Red, Black
- Owner: Wightlink Raiders 2007 Ltd
- Head coach: Jeremy Cornish
- Captain: Damon Larter
- Website: wightlinkraiders.com

Franchise history
- 1991–1992: Solent Vikings
- 1992–1999: Wightlink Raiders
- 1999–2004: Isle of Wight Raiders
- 2004–2016: Wightlink Raiders

The Wightlink Raiders was an ice hockey team based in Ryde on the Isle of Wight, England. The team were known for their small ice rink, Ryde Arena, which prevented them competing at a higher level. In 2016, following the closure of the rink by AEW UK, the building's landlord over a rent dispute with the community group which ran the ice rink , the team withdrew from the league and competitive play.

== History ==
Originally called the Solent Vikings, the team changed to their current name a year later. Although they were known as the Isle of Wight Raiders between 1999 and 2003 when Wightlink withdrew sponsorship, before the company re-joined the club in 2004. They are still the only club to be formally known with their sponsor in their name. Due to the club's location on the Isle of Wight, the team struggled to survive without Wightlink's support.

In the 1990s, they dominated the English National League (now called the English Premier League), winning the league a record five straight years, including winning the league's cup competition during that time as well.
