= Milton Keynes Kings =

Ice hockey team in Buckinghamshire, England

- City: Milton Keynes, England
- League: British National League (1999–2002); English Premier Ice Hockey League (1998–1999); British Hockey League (1990–1996)
- Founded: 1990
- Folded: 2002
- Home arena: Planet Ice Arena Milton Keynes
- Colours
- Head coach: (Canada) / (United Kingdom) Rick Strachan

Milton Keynes Kings were an Ice Hockey team based in Milton Keynes, England.

== History ==
The MK Kings originally played in various divisions of the British Hockey League (BHL) from 1990 until 1996. In 1998, two seasons after the closure of the BHL, they joined the English Premier Ice Hockey League (EPIHL) for a season before moving into the higher level British National League for four consecutive seasons between 1999 and 2003.

Following a dispute with the owners of the Planet Ice Arena in Milton Keynes in 2002; combined with the dissolution of the second incarnation of the Solihull Barons, the team relocated to the Blue Ice Plaza in Solihull, where they rebranded themselves the Solihull MK Kings for the 2002-03 BNL season; effectively merging the Milton Keynes and Solihull franchises in that league.

Around the same time that the move to Solihull occurred, the owners of Planet Ice Arena formed the Milton Keynes Lightning; whom joined the EPIHL shortly after their formation. Following the culmination of the Kings' first season in Solihull in May 2003; the team resigned from the BNL and was dissolved.

Following their dissolution; they were first replaced in Solihull by the newly formed Solihull Kings, who joined the EPIHL for two seasons between 2003 and 2005 before dissolving; and later replaced by a reformed Solihull Barons who again joined the EPIHL for two seasons between 2005 and 2007; before settling into the lower English National Ice Hockey League from 2007 onwards.
