= English Premier Ice Hockey League =

Former ice hockey league in England

English Premier Ice Hockey League (EPIHL)
- Sport: Ice hockey
- Founded: 1998 (1997 as part of ENIHL)
- First season: 1998–99 (1997–98 as part of ENIHL)
- Folded: 2016–2017
- CEO: Ken Taggart
- No. of teams: 10
- Country: England (10 teams)
- Headquarters: Blackpool, Lancashire, England
- Continent: Europe
- Last champions: League:Telford Tigers (2nd title); Playoffs: Milton Keynes Lightning; Cup: Milton Keynes Lightning
- Most titles: League: Guildford Flames (4)

Notes
- See Elite Ice Hockey League and National Ice Hockey League

The English Premier Ice Hockey League (EPIHL) was an ice hockey league of 10 teams, all of which were based in England. Headquartered in Blackpool, the EPIHL was one of two professional ice hockey leagues in the United Kingdom (the other being the Elite Ice Hockey League). A total of 27 teams played in the league at one time or another. Swindon Wildcats were the only team to have consistently featured in the EPIHL from its inaugural season in 1997–98. In 2017, the league was disbanded, with its teams either joining the top-tier Elite Ice Hockey League or the second-tier National Ice Hockey League.

== History ==
The league was founded in 1997, under the banner of "national division", as part of the English National Ice Hockey League in order to serve former members of the British National League who couldn't afford to remain in the latter as a result of increased operating costs; but who were capable of a level of play above the import-free English leagues that made up the rest of the ENIHL. During the 1997–98 season the teams that constituted this division played dual schedules; a series of games solely amongst their own division, and another amongst all the teams that were playing under the ENIHL at that time.

Each year, the league crowned a regular season champion, a post-season playoffs champion, and a knockout Cup champion. Solihull Blaze won the league and play-off trophies of both formats during this inaugural season. At the start of the 1998–99 season the divisions, whilst still both under the ENIHL umbrella, performed in their own separate competitions; and the national division adopted the name "premier division", and later on became known as the "premier league". By the end of the season the league had established itself outside of the ENIHL as the "English Premier Ice Hockey League". In 2005 the BNL disbanded; leaving the EPIHL to take its place as the second tier of the national game.

In 2017, the league was dissolved. The Milton Keynes Lightning and Guildford Flames joined the Elite League, Manchester Phoenix folded, and the remaining seven teams became part of the National Ice Hockey League.

== Organizational structure ==
The league was ruled and governed by the English Ice Hockey Association. The last chairman of the EPIHL was Ken Taggart.

=== Executives ===
- Chairman: Ken Taggart
- Chief Referee: Mohammad Ashraff
- Administrator: Mary Faunt
- Fixtures Secretary: Gary Dent
- Teams Owners Rep: Harry Howton
- Statistician: Malcolm Preen
- Registrations: Liz Moralee

== Teams 2016–17 season ==
| Team | City | Arena | Capacity | Founded | Joined | Tenure | Head coach | Captain |
|---|---|---|---|---|---|---|---|---|
| Basingstoke Bison | Basingstoke, Hampshire | Planet Ice Silverdome Arena | 2,000 | 1988 | 2009 | 2009–present | Doug Sheppard (P/C) | Joe Greener |
| Bracknell Bees | Bracknell, Berkshire | John Nike Leisuresport Complex | 2,400 | 1987 | 2005 | 2005–present | Lukas Smital (P/C) | Matt Foord (England) |
| Hull Pirates | Hull, East Riding of Yorkshire | Hull Arena | 3,750 | 2015 | 2015 | 2015–present | Dominc Osman (P/C) | Nathan Salem (England) |
| Peterborough Phantoms | Peterborough, Cambridgeshire | Planet Ice Peterborough | 1,250 | 2002 | 2002 | 2002–present | Slava Koulikov (P/C) | James Ferrara (England) |
| Sheffield Steeldogs | Sheffield, South Yorkshire | IceSheffield | 1,500 | 2001 | 2005 | 2005–present | Greg Wood (P/C) | Ben Morgan (England) |
| Swindon Wildcats | Swindon, Wiltshire | Link Centre | 2,800 | 1986 | 1997 | 1997–present | Aaron Nell (P/C) | Jan Košťál (Czech Republic) |
| Telford Tigers | Telford, Shropshire | Telford Ice Rink | 600 | 2001 | 2010 | 2002–2009, 2010–present | Tom Watkins | Jason Silverthorn (Canada) (United Kingdom) |

Notes

1. Although the Telford Tigers joined the league in 2005. They did not play in the 2009–10 season due to financial issues.

=== Former teams ===
| Team | City | Founded | Joined | Left |
|---|---|---|---|---|
| Billingham Eagles | Billingham, Stockton-on-Tees | 1996 | 1997 | 1998 |
| Blackburn Hawks | Blackburn, Lancashire | 1990 | 1998 | 1999 |
| Chelmsford Chieftains | Chelmsford, Essex | 1987 | 1998; 2002 | 2000; 2008 |
| Solihull Blaze | Solihull, West Midlands | 1965 | 1997 | 1999 |
| Guildford Flames | Guildford, Surrey | 1992 | 2005 | 2017 |
| Haringey Greyhounds | Harringay, Greater London | 1990 | 2000 | 2003 |
| Hull Stingrays | Kingston upon Hull, East Riding of Yorkshire | 2003 | 2005 | 2006 |
| Invicta Dynamos | Gillingham, Kent | 1997 | 1997 | 2003 |
| Kingston Jets | Kingston-upon-Thames, London | 1996 | 1997 | 1998 |
| London Raiders | Romford, Greater London | 1987 | 1998; 2002 | 2000; 2010 |
| Manchester Phoenix | Manchester | 2003 | 2009 | 2017 |
| Milton Keynes Kings | Milton Keynes, Buckinghamshire | 1990 | 1998 | 1999 |
| Milton Keynes Lightning | Milton Keynes, Buckinghamshire | 2002 | 2002 | 2017 |
| Nottingham Lions | Nottingham, Nottinghamshire | 2000 | 2000 | 2003 |
| Oxford Blades | Oxford, Oxfordshire | 1998 | 1998 | 2000 |
| Slough Jets | Slough, Berkshire | 1986 | 2002 | 2014 |
| Solihull Barons | Solihull, West Midlands | 2000; 2005 | 2000; 2005 | 2002; 2007 |
| Solihull Kings | Solihull, West Midlands | 2003 | 2003 | 2005 |
| Sunderland Chiefs | Sunderland, Tyne and Wear | 1977 | 1997 | 1998 |
| Whitley Warriors | Whitley Bay, Tyne and Wear | 1955 | 1997 | 1998 |
| Wightlink Raiders | Ryde, Isle of Wight | 1991 | 1997 | 2009 |

== Champions ==
| Season | League | Play-offs | EPL Cup |
|---|---|---|---|
| 1997–98 | Solihull Blaze | Solihull Blaze | — |
| 1998–99 | Solihull Blaze | Solihull Blaze | Milton Keynes Kings |
| 1999–00 | Chelmsford Chieftains | Chelmsford Chieftains | — |
| 2000–01 | Swindon Wildcats | London Raiders | — |
| 2001–02 | Invicta Dynamos | Invicta Dynamos | London Raiders |
| 2002–03 | Peterborough Phantoms | Milton Keynes Lightning | Wightlink Raiders |
| 2003–04 | Milton Keynes Lightning | Milton Keynes Lightning | Peterborough Phantoms |
| 2004–05 | Milton Keynes Lightning | Milton Keynes Lightning | London Raiders |
| 2005–06 | Guildford Flames | Milton Keynes Lightning | Bracknell Bees |
| 2006–07 | Bracknell Bees | Bracknell Bees | Guildford Flames |
| 2007–08 | Guildford Flames | Slough Jets | Bracknell Bees |
| 2008–09 | Peterborough Phantoms | Peterborough Phantoms | Peterborough Phantoms |
| 2009–10 | Milton Keynes Lightning | Slough Jets | Guildford Flames |
| 2010–11 | Manchester Phoenix | Guildford Flames | Slough Jets |
| 2011–12 | Guildford Flames | Slough Jets | Guildford Flames |
| 2012–13 | Guildford Flames | Manchester Phoenix | Guildford Flames |
| 2013–14 | Manchester Phoenix | Basingstoke Bison | Basingstoke Bison |
| 2014–15 | Telford Tigers | Peterborough Phantoms | Telford Tigers |
| 2015–16 | Basingstoke Bison | Guildford Flames | Guildford Flames |
| 2016–17 | Telford Tigers | Milton Keynes Lightning | Milton Keynes Lightning |

=== Team total championships ===
| Team | League | Play-offs | EPL Cup | Total |
|---|---|---|---|---|
| Guildford Flames | 4 | 2 | 5 | 11 |
| Milton Keynes Lightning | 3 | 5 | 1 | 9 |
| Peterborough Phantoms | 2 | 2 | 2 | 6 |
| Solihull Blaze | 2 | 2 | 0 | 4 |
| Bracknell Bees | 1 | 1 | 2 | 4 |
| Slough Jets | 0 | 3 | 1 | 4 |
| Manchester Phoenix | 2 | 1 | 0 | 3 |
| London Raiders | 0 | 1 | 2 | 3 |
| Basingstoke Bison | 1 | 1 | 1 | 3 |
| Chelmsford Chieftains | 1 | 1 | 0 | 2 |
| Invicta Dynamos | 1 | 1 | 0 | 2 |
| Telford Tigers | 2 | 0 | 1 | 3 |
| Swindon Wildcats | 1 | 0 | 0 | 1 |
| Milton Keynes Kings | 0 | 0 | 1 | 1 |
| Wightlink Raiders | 0 | 0 | 1 | 1 |
