= Ice hockey in Scotland =

Overview of ice hockey practiced in Scotland

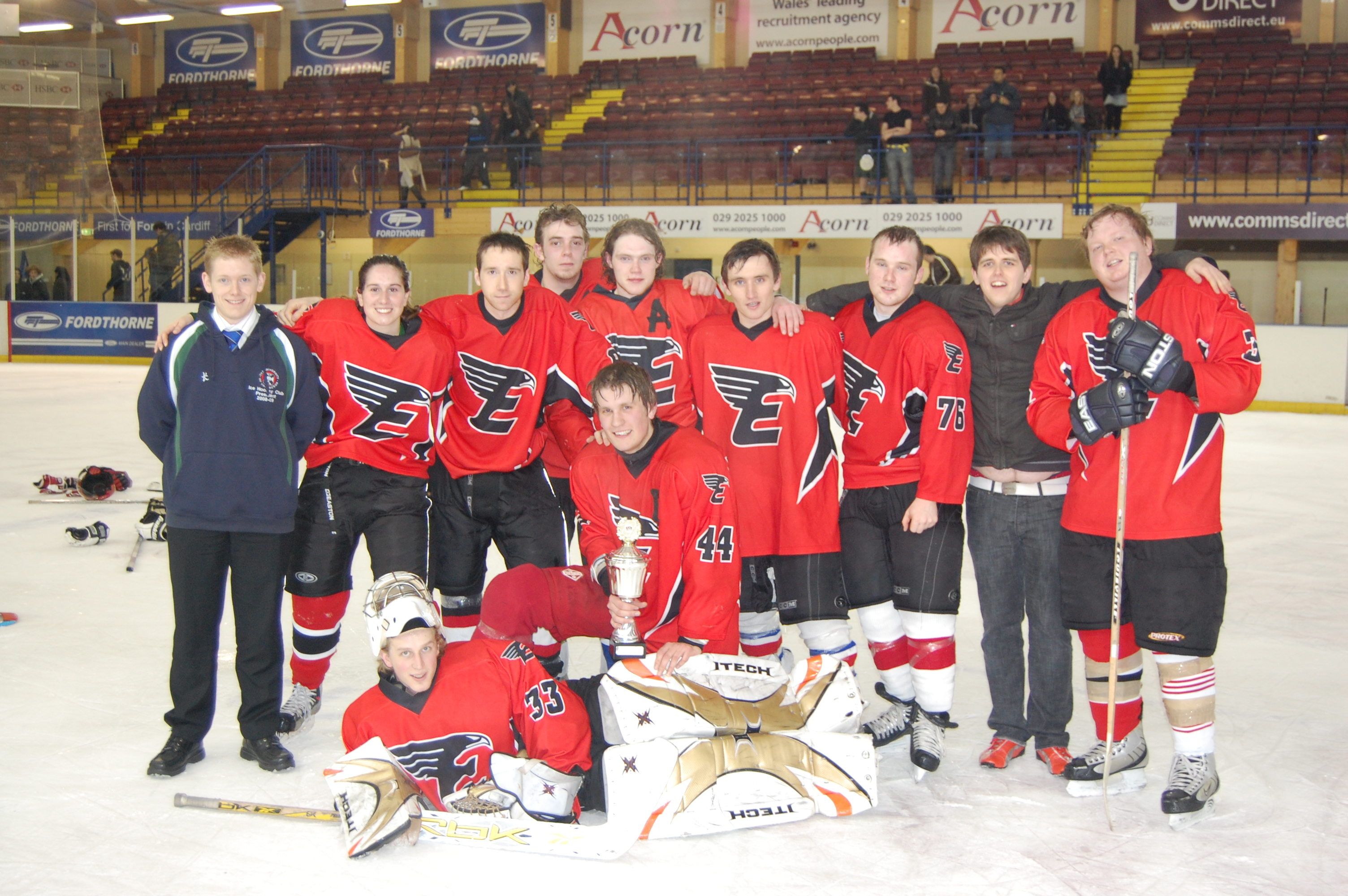
- The Edinburgh Eagles celebrate their victory in 2009
- Country: Scotland
- Governing body: Ice Hockey UK
- National teams: Men's national team; Women's national team
- First played: 1910

National competitions
- Elite Ice Hockey League Scottish National League

Club competitions
- Scottish Cup

Ice hockey is the most popular indoor sport in Scotland, with a fairly established presence in each of the population centres and a spectator attendance lower only than football and rugby union. The term "hockey" is usually reserved for field hockey in Scotland, and "ice hockey" is normally referred to by its full form.

As with curling (a sport of Scottish origin), the game tends to be more commonly played indoors these days, due to milder winters in the past few decades. Ice hockey is thus played on indoor rinks in Scotland, with the possible exception of street hockey, which is played at an informal level within the country.

== Governing body ==
The national governing body used to be Scottish Ice Hockey but is now Ice Hockey UK.

On June 30, 2026 a historical merger was announced as Scottish Ice Hockey, English Ice Hockey and Ice Hockey UK joined together to form a unified governing body for ice hockey.

== Shinty and the possible Scottish origins of ice hockey ==
Despite the official introduction of ice hockey into Scotland in the twentieth century, its roots in Scotland go far deeper. To this day, ice hockey is often referred to as "shinny" and "hurtling" in Canada, suggesting a tie up with shinty and Ireland's hurling. Shinty is the national stick game of Scotland, and Phil Dracket who favours an English origin for the game, in the Fens of Cambridgeshire admits:

"in the formative years of the game the dividing line between hockey, bandy and shinty was always a fine one."

In fact, Charles Goodman Tebbutt, who wrote down the first English bandy rules, claimed the words were interchangeable:

"THE game of bandy, otherwise known as hockey or shinney, or shinty, is doubtless one of the earliest pastimes of the kind ever known."

However, the similarities between the two sports, post-codification are still notable:

"[in shinty] as in ice hockey, both sides of the hook [of the stick] are used to strike the ball, but there is no restriction on the height to which the stick may be raised."

The origins of ice hockey was discussed in Ice Hockey in Alba by Calan Yule, the book broke down the origins of the game dating it back to the great winter in Scotland.

== Domestic structure ==
Ice hockey in Scotland is organised across professional, senior, junior, women’s and recreational levels. Unlike Scottish football, these competitions do not form a conventional pyramid with automatic promotion and relegation between each division.

At the highest level is the Elite Ice Hockey League (EIHL), the United Kingdom’s leading professional ice hockey competition. The league consists of ten teams from Scotland, England, Wales and Northern Ireland. Scotland is represented by the Fife Flyers, Glasgow Clan and Dundee Stars, which compete against the league’s seven other clubs for the league championship, Challenge Cup and end-of-season play-off championship.

Below the EIHL in the domestic structure is the Scottish National League (SNL), the principal senior league administered by Scottish Ice Hockey. The SNL expanded to nine teams for the 2025–26 season following the addition of Solway Sharks SNL and Whitley Warriors. Despite its name, the competition is not restricted entirely to clubs based in Scotland, as Whitley Warriors are based in Whitley Bay, England.

The SNL provides senior competition for community-based clubs and developing players. Its season includes the regular league championship, the Scottish Cup and an end-of-season play-off competition. However, there is no system of automatic promotion from the SNL into the EIHL. Entry into the professional league depends on factors beyond results on the ice, including ownership, finances, facilities and approval from the EIHL.

Some Scottish players and clubs also participate in competitions outside the Scottish domestic structure. The Solway Sharks’ senior team, for example, competes in England’s National Ice Hockey League, while its SNL side provides an additional pathway for developing players. Two-way agreements can also allow players to represent teams at different levels during the same season.

Beneath senior hockey is Scotland’s junior development structure, with age-group competitions providing a pathway from youth hockey into the SNL, NIHL, EIHL and university game. Scotland also has organised women’s and recreational hockey, allowing the sport to be played across different ages, abilities and levels of competition.

Together, these levels form the domestic structure of Scottish ice hockey. Although they are connected through player development and club partnerships, they operate as separate competitions rather than as a single promotion-and-relegation pyramid.

== Scottish Clubs in the EIHL ==
The first Scottish club in the EIHL was the Edinburgh Capitals who joined the EIHL ahead of the 2004/05 season and they continued in the league for 13 season with their highest finish being 6th place.

The Glasgow Clan were the second Scottish team they joined ahead of the 2010/11 when they formed, they would have a mediocre start but by the 2014/15 season the Clan achieved 2nd place awarding them a spot in the 2015/16 Champions Hockey League.

The Dundee Stars would join the same season they had a similar start as the Glasgow Clan but they had their best finish the season before the Clan as they finished 3rd place in the 2013/14 season.

The Fife Flyers joined the EIHL in 2011/12 season after a decade away from top flight ice hockey, their best finish came in the 6th place which they achieved in 2015/16, 2016/17, and 2018/19, despite this they made the challenge cup final in 2022/23 season.

== Scottish National League ==
The Scottish National League (SNL) is the principal senior ice hockey competition administered by Scottish Ice Hockey. It operates below the professional Elite Ice Hockey League, although there is no automatic promotion or relegation between the two competitions. The SNL is primarily composed of community-based clubs and provides opportunities for experienced senior players and younger developing talent to compete regularly.

For the 2025–26 season, the SNL expanded from seven to nine teams with the addition of Solway Sharks SNL and Whitley Warriors. They joined Aberdeen Lynx, Dundee Rockets, Edinburgh Capitals, Kirkcaldy Kestrels, Kilmarnock Thunder, North Ayrshire Wild and Paisley Pirates. Whitley Warriors are based in Whitley Bay, England, meaning that not every team participating in the Scottish National League is geographically based in Scotland

The domestic season consists of the regular league competition, the Scottish Cup and an end-of-season play-off tournament. Consequently, clubs have several opportunities to win silverware during a single campaign. The SNL also plays an important developmental role within Scottish ice hockey, helping players progress from junior competition into senior hockey and, in some cases, towards the National Ice Hockey League or Elite Ice Hockey League.

== See also ==
- Celtic League Cup

== Bibliography ==
- Drackett, Phil Flashing Blades, the Story of British Ice Hockey, The Crowood Press Ltd; (12 October 1987, ISBN 1852230614)
- Hutchinson, Roger Camanachd!: The Story of Shinty, Birlinn Ltd (16 November 2004, ISBN 184158326X)
- MacLennan, Hugh Dan, Not an orchid, Kessock Communications (1995, Scotland, ISBN 0952619504)
- Yule, Calan, Ice Hockey in Alba, Amazon (26 December 2025, ISBN 979-8-2859-4763-9)
