= Kevin Conway (ice hockey) =

Canadian ice hockey player

- Born: 13 July 1963 (age 63) Sault Ste. Marie, Ontario, Canada
- Height: 5 ft 10 in (178 cm)
- Weight: 179 lb (81 kg; 12 st 11 lb)
- Position: Right Winger
- Shot: Right
- Played for: Toledo Goaldiggers; Salt Lake Golden Eagles; Ayr Bruins; Indianapolis Checkers; Durham Wasps; Telford Tigers; Cleveland Bombers; Basingstoke Beavers/Bison; Newcastle Riverkings; Chelmsford Chieftains; Hull Thunder; Solihull MK Kings/Barons; Solway Sharks
- National team: Great Britain
- Playing career: 1983–2004; 2006–2008

Kevin Scott Conway (born 13 July 1963) is a Canadian former ice hockey player who played mainly in the United Kingdom. He is a member of the British Ice Hockey Hall of Fame.

== Playing career ==
=== Junior ===
Conway was born in Sault Ste. Marie, Ontario. He began his major-junior ice hockey career with the Oshawa Generals in the Ontario Hockey League (OHL) during the 1980–81 season.

The following season, 1981–82, Conway joined the Sault Ste. Marie Greyhounds also in the OHL. He helped them to finish second in their division and to the quarter finals of the playoffs. Staying with the Greyhounds again for the 1982–83 season, Conway helped the team to finish first in their division, win the Hamilton Spectator Trophy and to the final of the playoffs where they were defeated by the Oshawa Generals.

After just two games with the Greyhounds at the start of the 1983–84 season, Conway moved on to play with the Kingston Canadians. Although the Canadians finished bottom of their division that season and did not qualify for the playoffs, Conway still finished as the league's top scorer and in sixth place in the scoring leaders chart with 65 goals and 65 assists for 130 points in 63 games. Conway also won the William Hanley Trophy as the league's most sportsmanlike player.

=== Club ===
Conway started his professional career by signing for the Toledo Goaldiggers in the International Hockey League (IHL) and playing ten games for them during the 1983–84 season. The following season, 1984–85, Conway split between the Goaldiggers and the Salt Lake Golden Eagles also of the IHL.

In 1985, Conway signed for the Ayr Bruins in the Premier Division of the British Hockey League (BHL). Conway played for the Bruins for one season — taking the goal scoring record and being named to the 1986 Premier Division all-star team — before returning to North America and the IHL to play for the Indianapolis Checkers at the beginning of the 1986–87 season. Conway finished the season back in the United Kingdom with the Durham Wasps whom he helped to win the Heinekin Championship at Wembley Arena. He started the 1987–88 season with Durham before finishing it with the Telford Tigers in Division 1 of the BHL and earning himself the British Ice Hockey Writers Association Player of the Year trophy. After a further season with the Tigers, Conway moved to the Cleveland Bombers for the 1989–90 season, again in Division 1, where he earned a place on the Division 1 All-star team of 1990. Conway helped the Bombers to promotion to the Premier Division and stayed with them for the 1990–91 season.

Conway started his long association with Basingstoke when he joined the Beavers in the 1991–92 season playing in Division 1 of the BHL. Conway stayed with the Basingstoke team for seven seasons, helping them to promotion to the Premier Division in 1993 and into the newly formed Ice Hockey Superleague (ISL) in 1996 when the team changed its name to the Basingstoke Bison. During his time with Basingstoke, Conway earned himself two more Division 1 All-star places in 1992 and 1993 and finished as the team's all-time leading scorer with 950 points. In honour of his achievements at the club, Basingstoke retired his number 10 shirt in 2005.

Conway spent the following ISL season, 1998–99, with the Newcastle Riverkings before splitting the 1999–00 season with Hull Thunder in the British National League (BNL) and the Chelmsford Chieftains in the English Premier Ice Hockey League (EPIHL), whom he helped to win the league and playoff championships. He joined the Solihull Barons in the 2000–01 season with whom he stayed until he retired from professional ice hockey in 2004. In his final season with Solihull, Conway was the leading goal, assist and point scorer for the team.

After briefly coaching his son's junior ice hockey team, the Kingston River Rats, Conway was persuaded to come out of retirement by the Solway Sharks coach, Kevin Doherty, to play for the Sharks in the 2006–07 season in the Scottish National League and the Northern League. Conway continued to play for the Sharks in the 2007–08 season in the newly formed Scottish Premier Hockey League and the Northern League.

=== International ===
Conway made his first appearance for the Great Britain national ice hockey team at the Pool C World Championships held in Hull in 1992. Conway made an immediate impact for the team, scoring his first goal just 2 minutes and 16 seconds into his first game against Australia. Helping the GB team to win the tournament and gain promotion to Pool B, Conway scored 13 goals and 10 assists — making him the tournament leading scorer.

Conway also appeared in the 1993 GB team which won promotion to Pool A by sweeping all teams at the Pool B tournament held in the Netherlands. Conway was again the leading scorer for GB with 19 points from 8 goals an 11 assists.

Conway played for the GB team a total of 58 times between 1992 and 1999 and scored a total of 66 points from 33 goals and 33 assists.

== Awards and honours ==
- Awarded the William Hanley Trophy for the OHL's most sportsmanlike player in 1983–84.
- Named to the BHL Premier Division All-star in 1986.
- Named the BIHWA BHL Division 1 Player of the Year in 1987–88.
- Named to the BHL Division 1 All-star team in 1990, 1992 and 1993.
- Number 10 shirt retired by Basingstoke Bison in 2005.
- Inducted to the British Ice Hockey Hall of Fame in 2005.

== Records ==
- Most goals (6) and most powerplay goals (4) in one game for Kingston Canadians against Belleville Bulls on 3 February 1983.
- Leading goal scorer in the OHL in 1983–84.
- Leading goal scorer in the BHL Premier Division in 1985–86.
- Leading points scorer in the BHL Division 1 South in 1987–88.
- Leading scorer in the 1992 World Championships Pool C.
- All-time leading points scorer for Basingstoke Bison.
- Leading goal, assist and points scorer for the Solihull MK Kings in 2003–04.

== Career statistics ==
=== Club ===
			Regular season					Playoffs				
Season	Team	League	GP	G	A	Pts	PIM	GP	G	A	Pts	PIM
1980–81	Oshawa Generals	OHL	9	0	4	4	0	—	—	—	—	—
1981–82	Sault Ste. Marie Greyhounds	OHL	36	7	6	12	33	13	5	6	11	6
1982–83	Sault Ste. Marie Greyhounds	OHL	67	57	65	122	30	16	7	5	12	6
1983–84	Sault Ste. Marie Greyhounds	OHL	2	3	0	3	0	—	—	—	—	—
1983–84	Kingston Canadians	OHL	61	62	65	127	20	—	—	—	—	—
1983–84	Toledo Goaldiggers	IHL	10	3	7	10	5	13	5	10	15	12
1984–85	Toledo Goaldiggers	IHL	46	17	12	29	39	—	—	—	—	—
1984–85	Salt Lake Golden Eagles	IHL	36	13	14	27	11	3	0	0	0	0
1985–86	Ayr Bruins	BHL	35	129	98	227	69	4	6	8	14	11
1986–87	Indianapolis Checkers	IHL	29	11	8	19	29	—	—	—	—	—
1986–87	Durham Wasps	BHL	19	53	48	101	14	5	9	15	24	13
1987–88	Durham Wasps	BHL	2	3	8	11	2	—	—	—	—	—
1987–88	Telford Tigers	BHL	29	148	104	252	106	—	—	—	—	—
1988–89	Telford Tigers	BHL	24	80	86	166	71	—	—	—	—	—
1989–90	Cleveland Bombers	BHL	32	107	81	188	52	—	—	—	—	—
1990–91	Cleveland Bombers	BHL	36	48	46	94	66	—	—	—	—	—
1991–92	Basingstoke Beavers	BHL	36	100	75	175	46	—	—	—	—	—
1992–93	Basingstoke Beavers	BHL	31	87	84	171	22	—	—	—	—	—
1993–94	Basingstoke Beavers	BHL	44	64	64	128	42	—	—	—	—	—
1994–95	Basingstoke Beavers	BHL	44	47	76	123	28	4	3	5	8	4
1995–96	Basingstoke Beavers	BHL	36	35	33	68	40	6	4	4	8	6
1996–97	Basingstoke Bison	ISL	41	26	23	49	22	6	1	3	4	0
1997–98	Basingstoke Bison	ISL	42	18	21	39	20	6	1	7	8	2
1998–99	Newcastle Riverkings	ISL	42	16	19	35	10	6	2	3	5	0
1999–00	Hull Thunder	BNL	13	8	8	16	6	—	—	—	—	—
1999–00	Chelmsford Chieftains	EPIHL	8	6	6	12	6	4	3	3	6	0
2000–01	Solihull Barons	EPIHL	30	41	40	81	42	—	—	—	—	—
2001–02	Solihull Barons	EPIHL	23	27	34	61	24	—	—	—	—	—
2003–04	Solihull MK Kings	EPIHL	24	15	17	32	20	—	—	—	—	—
2006–07	Solway Sharks	SNL	15	19	14	33	24	—	—	—	—	—
2006–07	Solway Sharks	Northern League	18	17	27	44	14	—	—	—	—	—
2007–08	Solway Sharks	SNL	13	6	14	20	10	—	—	—	—	—
2007–08	Solway Sharks	Northern League	17	9	15	24	30	—	—	—	—	—

=== International ===
			Tournament				
Year	Team	Event	GP	G	A	Pts	PIM
1992	Great Britain	World Championships Pool C	5	13	10	23	6
1993	Great Britain	World Championships Pool B	7	8	11	19	8
1994	Great Britain	World Championships Pool A	6	2	1	3	6
1997	Great Britain	World Championships Pool B	7	2	3	5	0
1999	Great Britain	World Championships Pool B	7	1	3	4	8

== Footnotes ==
Awards
Preceded by Kirk Muller	William Hanley Trophy; 1983–84	Succeeded by Scott Tottle
Preceded by Garry Ungar	Player of the Year (British Hockey League Division 1); 1987–88	Succeeded by Luc Chabot
