= Scotsman (disambiguation) =

A Scotsman defines somebody from Scotland.

Scotsman may also refer to:

- The Scotsman, a national newspaper based in Edinburgh, Scotland
- The Scotsman Hotel in Edinburgh, Scotland (formally the offices of The Scotsman)
- The Scotsman, a character in the animated television series Samurai Jack
- "The Scotsman", a novelty song written by Mike Cross
  - performed by Bryan Bowers on the Dr. Demento 20th Anniversary Collection album
- Studebaker Scotsman, an American economy car from the 1950s
- LNER Class A3 4472 Flying Scotsman, a 1923 4-6-2 tender locomotive
- No true Scotsman, an informal fallacy

== See also ==
- Scottish Civil War
- Scottish Crown
- Scottish Cup (disambiguation)
- Scottish language
- Scottish people
