= 1996–97 British National League season =

The 1996–97 British National League season was the first season of the British National League, the second level of ice hockey in Great Britain. The Swindon IceLords won the Premier League and the Fife Flyers won the Northern Premier League. The Swindon IceLords won the inter-league championship.

== Premier League ==
=== First round ===
| | Club | GP | W | L | T | Goals | Pts |
|---|---|---|---|---|---|---|---|
| 1. | Swindon IceLords | 56 | 47 | 9 | 0 | 436:169 | 94 |
| 2. | Solihull Blaze | 56 | 41 | 12 | 3 | 389:219 | 85 |
| 3. | Slough Jets | 56 | 39 | 14 | 3 | 316:171 | 81 |
| 4. | Guildford Flames | 56 | 35 | 19 | 2 | 310:217 | 72 |
| 5. | Kingston Hawks | 56 | 28 | 28 | 0 | 305:269 | 56 |
| 6. | Telford Tigers | 56 | 19 | 35 | 2 | 303:313 | 40 |
| 7. | Medway Bears | 56 | 12 | 43 | 1 | 231:464 | 25 |
| 8. | Peterborough Pirates | 56 | 3 | 52 | 1 | 173:641 | 7 |

=== Final round ===
| | Club | GP | W | L | T | Goals | Pts |
|---|---|---|---|---|---|---|---|
| 1. | Swindon IceLords | 8 | 6 | 2 | 0 | 38:23 | 12 |
| 2. | Slough Jets | 8 | 4 | 3 | 1 | 29:30 | 9 |
| 3. | Kingston Hawks | 8 | 4 | 4 | 0 | 26:34 | 8 |
| 4. | Guildford Flames | 8 | 3 | 4 | 1 | 36:38 | 7 |
| 5. | Telford Tigers | 8 | 3 | 4 | 1 | 35:39 | 7 |

=== Playoffs ===
==== 3rd place game ====
- Kingston Hawks - Guildford Flames 3:9, 6:4

==== Final ====
- Slough Jets - Swindon IceLords 4:3, 1:3

== Northern Premier League ==
=== First round ===
| | Club | GP | W | T | L | Goals | Pts |
|---|---|---|---|---|---|---|---|
| 1. | Fife Flyers | 36 | 33 | 0 | 3 | 315:130 | 66 |
| 2. | Paisley Pirates | 36 | 26 | 0 | 10 | 316:144 | 52 |
| 3. | Whitley Bay Warriors | 36 | 23 | 0 | 13 | 236:200 | 46 |
| 4. | Blackburn Hawks | 36 | 15 | 1 | 20 | 207:240 | 31 |
| 5. | Dumfries Vikings | 36 | 12 | 1 | 23 | 171:271 | 25 |
| 6. | Murrayfield Royals | 36 | 9 | 1 | 26 | 168:260 | 19 |
| 7. | Castlereagh Knights | 36 | 6 | 1 | 29 | 156:324 | 13 |

=== Playoffs ===
==== Group A ====
| | Club | GP | W | T | L | Goals | Pts |
|---|---|---|---|---|---|---|---|
| 1. | Fife Flyers | 6 | 5 | 0 | 1 | 83:26 | 10 |
| 2. | Whitley Bay Warriors | 6 | 5 | 0 | 1 | 70:35 | 10 |
| 3. | Dumfries Vikings | 6 | 1 | 0 | 5 | 31:56 | 2 |
| 4. | Castlereagh Knights | 6 | 1 | 0 | 5 | 27:94 | 2 |

==== Group B ====
| | Club | GP | W | T | L | Goals | Pts |
|---|---|---|---|---|---|---|---|
| 1. | Paisley Pirates | 4 | 4 | 0 | 0 | 40:24 | 8 |
| 2. | Blackburn Hawks | 4 | 1 | 1 | 2 | 25:27 | 3 |
| 3. | Murrayfield Royals | 4 | 0 | 1 | 3 | 17:31 | 1 |

==== Final ====
| | Club | GP | W | T | L | Goals | Pts |
|---|---|---|---|---|---|---|---|
| 1. | Fife Flyers | 6 | 5 | 0 | 1 | 50:16 | 11 |
| 2. | Paisley Pirates | 6 | 4 | 1 | 1 | 46:33 | 9 |
| 3. | Whitley Bay Warriors | 6 | 2 | 0 | 4 | 34:39 | 4 |
| 4. | Blackburn Hawks | 6 | 0 | 0 | 6 | 30:72 | 0 |

== Inter-League Final ==
- Fife Flyers - Swindon IceLords 0:5
