= Lee Valley Lions =

Ice hockey team based in Leyton, East London

- City: Leyton, Waltham Forest, London, United Kingdom
- League: NIHL 2 South East Division
- Founded: 1984
- Operated: 1984-1995, 2005-present
- Home arena: Lee Valley Ice Centre
- Colours: White, Green and Blue
- General manager: (England) Eddie Joseph
- Head coach: (England) James Joseph
- Captain: (England) Simon Jones
- Website: www.leevalleylions.co.uk

The Lee Valley Lions are an ice hockey team based in Leyton's Lee Valley Ice Centre, in East London

== History ==
=== First incarnation (1984-1995) ===
The Lee Valley Lions were formed in early 1984. In their first season, they finished in sixth place in the British League Division 1, the second tier of British ice hockey at the time. The next season, the team finished in second place, losing their last game to fall out of first place.

From 1986/87 through to 1989/90, the Lions languished near the bottom of the league, never finishing higher than seventh place. In 1988/89, the Lions would have been relegated if not for the expulsion of the Deeside Dragons from the league. In 1990 British Engine became the team's main sponsor, prompting a change in the team's colours from the original white/green/blue, to red/black/white. The 1990/91 through 1994/1995 seasons were no better than what had preceded them, with the Lions remaining near the bottom of the league table, and in danger of relegation at the end of the 1994/95 season.

Financial difficulties led the Lions to fold in 1995.

=== Second incarnation (2005-present) ===
In 2005, the Lee Valley Lions were reformed under former player Eddie Joseph. It was to compete in the English National Ice Hockey League with the team mainly comprising players from the junior system and some former players from the first incarnation. The team also returned to its traditional white, green, and blue colours. In their return season, the Lions struggled, suffered several heavy defeats, and failed to register any points. The team finished bottom of the league, losing all of their matches. The following season (2006/07) saw wholesale changes made to the team, with new coach Sergei Smolenko being brought in alongside former Chelmsford Chieftains Captain James Hatfull to bolster the team's experience. Whilst there were significant improvements, the league positions during this period were unchanged with the Lions never finishing higher than seventh (2007/08) under the new coach. With the reorganisation of the league structure for the beginning of the 2008/09 season, the Lee Valley Lions competed in the English National Ice Hockey League South Two (which itself was renamed the National Ice Hockey League South Two in time for the 2012/13 season).

There was some small non-league-related success achieved at the end of the 2007/08 season when the Lions travelled to the Isle of Wight for the first Vectis Tigers "Ice Cube Tournament" which involved several English National Ice Hockey League and senior recreational teams. After remaining unbeaten and winning their group on goal difference ahead of the hosts, the Lions beat the former English Premier Ice Hockey League side the Solihull Barons in the semi-final 4–1, followed by a 7–0 win in the final over the London University Dragons.

The 2009/10 season brought a period of stagnation and under performance for the Lee Valley Lions, unaltered by two changes in Head Coach (Ian Prince and then David Richards). Between 2009/10 and 2014/15 the best final league position achieved was seventh in the 2011/12 season.

Under the coaching of Garry Dodds and former Netminder George Alley, there appeared to be an upturn in the fortunes of the Lions. The 2014/15 season saw them finish in fifth place, the best league position since the 1985/86 season when they had been runners-up in the old British league Division One. The following year the team improved again to finish fourth, and the 2016/17 season brought another creditable fifth in the league.

The last season of George Alley's tenure as Head Coach (2017/18) coincided with a league restructure which pitted powerful former National Ice Hockey League South 1 teams such as Bracknell Hornets, Chelmsford Chieftains, Oxford City Stars and Solent Devils against the traditionally weaker South 2 sides. This saw the return of the Lions struggling at the lower end of the league. Only one league win was registered via the forfeiture of a game by the Swindon Wildcats NIHL2 team. The season's end saw the coach and most of the team leave. The 2018/19 season started with James Joseph leading the team in his first coaching position whilst retaining his role as the club's longest-serving Defenceman. With a short-benched team, mainly consisting of veteran, former recreational and junior players experiencing their first taste of senior league hockey, the Lions struggled for any consistency. The team managed a single win during the season, 5–0 away to Swindon Wildcats NIHL2. The 2019/20 season was cut short by the COVID-19 pandemic. The Lions did not play during the 2020/21 season due to the league cancelling all games due to the pandemic. In June 2021 it was announced that the team's home, the Lee Valley Ice Centre would be closing for 16 months for major renovation work, with the team playing out of the Cambridge Ice Arena.

== Honours ==
Heineken League British Division One League Runners Up: 1985/86

Heineken League British Division One Trophy Winners: 1985/86

== Club roster 2022-2023 ==
Netminders
No.	Nat.	Player	Catches	Date of birth	Place of birth	Acquired
1	(England)	James Andrew	R	25 June 1991 (age 35)	Peterborough	2022 from Free Agent
93	(United Kingdom) (Japan)	Naomi Healey	R	23 July 1993 (age 33)	Tokyo, Japan	2019 from Guildford Lightning

Defencemen
No.	Nat.	Player	Shoots	Date of birth	Place of birth	Acquired
7	(Czech Republic) (United Kingdom)	Ivo Buchlovsky	R	1 January 1986 (age 40)	Czech Republic	2021 Free Agent
11	(England)	Samuel Brazier	R	1 January 1999 (age 27)	England	2021 from Nottingham Mavericks University Ice Hockey Club
16	(England)	Simon Jones	R	9 January 1987 (age 39)	England	2015 from Free Agent
17	(England)	Brian Winstanley	R	18 October 1986 (age 39)	England	2022 from Free Agent
22	(England)	Nicky Lovejoy	R	21 January 1983 (age 43)	England	2022 from Free Agent
27	(England)	Alex Weems	R	9 August 1997 (age 29)	England	2022 from Free Agent
32	(England)	James Joseph	R	19 October 1986 (age 39)	England	2004 from Lee Valley Lions Junior Ice Hockey Club
34	(England)	Matthew Hamilton	R	3 January 1996 (age 30)	England	2021 Romford Raiders
36	(England)	Mitchell Leer	R	1 December 1990 (age 35)	Torbay	2022 from Free Agent

Forwards
No.	Nat.	Player	Shoots	Date of birth	Place of birth	Acquired
3	(England)	Tajah Allen	R	12 June 2003 (age 23)	England	2022 from Free Agent
8	(England)	Tyrone Wells	R	22 September 1998 (age 27)	England	2019 from Free Agent
10	(England)	Charlotte Davenport-Jeffery	R	22 January 2004 (age 22)	England	2022 from Streatham Storm
12	(United Kingdom) (Portugal)	Joshua Hudak	R	9 March 2002 (age 24)	Portugal	2021 from Free Agent
17	(England)	Shane Bojenko	R	12 June 1990 (age 36)	England	2021 from Free Agent
18	(England)	Eric Perry	R	28 June 2003 (age 23)	England	2022 from Free Agent
19	(Canada)	Raphael Girard	L		Montreal, Canada	2021 from London Dragons University Ice Hockey Club
20	(England)	Sebastian Echeverri	R	1 January 2004 (age 22)	England	2021 from Romford Raiders Junior Ice Hockey Club
23	(England)	Joe Miller	R	1 January 1999 (age 27)	England	2017 from Lee Valley Junior Ice Hockey Club
24	(England)	Terry Lucas	R	10 May 1995 (age 31)	England	2022 from Free Agent
31	(England)	Ross Sin-Hidge	R	24 August 1990 (age 35)	England	2022 from Free Agent
58	(England)	Kody Edwards	R	22 August 1989 (age 36)	Chelmsford	2021 from Chelmsford Mischief
TBA	(England)	Harry Trebilcook	R		England	2022 from Free Agent
TBA	(England)	Leonie Charles	R	29 July 2001 (age 25)	Sidcup, England	2019 from Guildford Lightning

== Statistical records ==
=== Top ten appearances ===
League, Cup & Play Offs; as at end of 2021/22 Season

Player
No.	Nat.	Player	Active Seasons	App
1	(England)	James Joseph	2005–2022 inclusive	319
2	(England)	Eddie Joseph	1984-1993 & 2005-2006	249
3	(England)	Steve James	1989–1995 inclusive	244
4	(England)	Glen Moorhouse	1988-1995 inclusive	221
5	(England)	Jon Beckett	1987-1989 & 1991-1995	209
6	(England)	Richard Hodge	2005-2007, 2009-2014 & 2018-2019	170
7	(England)	Neil Stower	1989-1995 inclusive	166
8	(England)	Joseph Berry	2005-2009, 2010-2016 & 2018-2020	164
9	(England)	James Hatfull	2006-2015 inclusive	159
10	(England)	Jack Ball	2011–2015 & 2018-2019	148

=== Top ten Points Scorers ===
League, Cup & Play Offs; as at end of 2021/22 Season

Player
No.	Nat.	Player	Active Seasons	Pts
1	(Finland)	Jan Lehti	1985-1987 inclusive	386
2	(Canada)	David Ducharme	1987-1989 inclusive	317
3	(Canada)	Doug McEwen	1987–1989 inclusive	295
4	(Canada)	Darcy Cahill	1993-1994 inclusive	236
5	(England)	Chris Leggatt	1985-1990 inclusive	208
6	(Finland)	Ari Arvila	1985-1986	175
7	(England)	Nick Alley	2007-2009 & 2013-2018	168
8	(Canada)	Mike Farard	1986-1987 & 1989-1990	163
9	(Czech Republic)	Jaroslav Lycka	1987-1989 inclusive	155
10	(Canada)	Derek Higdon	1991-1992	152

=== Top ten goal scorers ===
League, Cup & Play Offs; as at end of 2021/22 Season

Player
No.	Nat.	Player	Active Seasons	Gls
1	(Finland)	Jari Lehti	1985-1987 inclusive	225
2	(Canada)	Doug McEwan	1987-1989 inclusive	170
3	(Canada)	David Ducharme	1987-1989 inclusive	161
4	(Finland)	Ari Arvila	1985-1986	108
5	(Canada)	Mike Fafard	1986-1987 & 1989-1990	85
5	(England)	Scott Beeson	2005-2009 & 2011-2013	85
7	(Canada)	Derek Higson	1991-1992	84
8	(England)	Nick Alley	2007-2009 & 2013-2018	81
9	(Canada)	Danny Cahill	1993-1994	79
9	(England)	Chris Leggatt	1985-1990 inclusive	79

=== Top ten goal assists ===
League, Cup & Play Offs; as at end of 2021/22 Season

Player
No.	Nat.	Player	Active Seasons	Ast
1	(Finland)	Jan Lehti	1985-1987 inclusive	161
2	(Canada)	Darcy Cahill	1993-1994	157
3	(Canada)	David Ducharme	1987-1989 inclusive	156
4	(England)	Chris Leggatt	1985-1990 inclusive	129
5	(Canada)	Doug McEwan	1987-1989 inclusive	125
6	(England)	Geoff Williams	1984-1987 inclusive	100
7	(England)	Steve James	1989-1995 inclusive	97
8	(England)	Mark Salisbury	1989-1991 & 1992-1993	88
9	(England)	Nick Alley	2007-2009 & 2013-2018	87
10	(England)	Lee Whale	1986-1991 inclusive	86

=== Top ten penalty minutes ===
League, Cup & Play Offs; as at end of 2021/22 Season

Player
No.	Nat.	Player	Active Seasons	PIM
1	(Lithuania)	Romanas Fedotovas	2005-2009 & 2011-2014	532
2	(England)	James Hatfull	2006–2015 inclusive	521
3	(England)	Jon Beckett	1987-1989 & 1991-1995	396
4	(England)	James Joseph	2005–2022 inclusive	369
5	(England)	Joseph Berry	2005-2009, 2010-2016 & 2018-2020	359
6	(England)	Mark Salisbury	1989-1991 & 1992-1993	341
7	(England)	Eddie Joseph	1984-1993 & 2005-2006	316
8	(England)	Nick Alley	2007–2009 & 2013-2018	302
9	(England)	Chris Leggatt	1985-1990 inclusive	277
10	(England)	Brian Biddulph	1992-1993 & 1994-1995	269

=== Top ten points to game ratio ===
League, Cup & Play Offs; as at end of 2021/22 Season (Players with under 20 appearances not included)

Player
No.	Nat.	Player	Active Seasons	Pts
1	(Canada)	Mike Fafard	1986-1987 & 1989-1990	7.09
2	(Canada)	Fred Perlini	1993-1994	5.90
3	(Finland)	Ari Arvila	1985-1986	5.83
4	(Finland)	Jan Lehti	1985-1987 inclusive	5.68
5	(Canada)	Darcy Cahill	1993-1994	5.36
6	(Canada)	David Ducharme	1987-1989 inclusive	5.11
7	(Canada)	Doug McEwan	1987-1989 inclusive	4.61
8	(Canada)	Jeff Job	1991-1992	4.30
9	(Canada)	Rod Schulter	1990-1991	3.96
10	(Canada)	Derek Higdon	1991-1992	3.71

=== Top ten goals to game ratio ===
League, Cup & Play Offs; as at end of 2021/22 Season (Players with under 20 appearances not included)

Player
No.	Nat.	Player	Active Seasons	Gls
1	(Canada)	Mike Fafard	1986-1987 & 1989-1990	3.70
2	(Finland)	Ari Arvila	1985-1986	3.60
3	(Canada)	Fred Perlini	1993-1994	3.55
4	(Finland)	Jan Lehti	1985-1987 inclusive	3.31
5	(Canada)	Jeff Job	1991-1992	2.96
6	(Canada)	Doug McEwan	1987-1989 inclusive	2.66
7	(Canada)	David Ducharme	1987-1989 inclusive	2.60
8	(Canada)	Rod Schulter	1990-1991	2.27
9	(Canada)	Derek Higdon	1991-1992	2.05
10	(Canada)	Darcy Cahill	1993-1994	1.80

=== Top ten assists to game ratio ===
League, Cup & Play Offs; as at end of 2021/22 Season (Players with under 20 appearances not included)

Player
No.	Nat.	Player	Active Seasons	Ast
1	(Canada)	Darcy Cahill	1993-1994	3.57
2	(Canada)	Mike Fafard	1986-1987 & 1989-1990	3.39
3	(Canada)	David Ducharme	1987-1989 inclusive	2.52
4	(Finland)	Jan Lehti	1985-1987 inclusive	2.37
5	(Canada)	Fred Perlini	1993-1994	2.35
6	(Finland)	Ari Arvila	1985-1986	2.33
7	(Canada)	Greg Cyr	1990-1991	2.05
8	(Canada)	Doug McEwan	1987-1989 inclusive	1.95
9	(Scotland)	Campbell Blair	1992-1993	1.79
10	(Canada)	Rod Schulter	1990-1991	1.69

=== Top ten penalty minutes to games ratio ===
League, Cup & Play Offs; as at end of 2021/22 Season (Players with under 20 appearances not included)

Player
No.	Nat.	Player	Active Seasons	PIM
1	(Canada)	Rob McCaig	1993-1995 inclusive	7.43
2	(Canada)	Mike Fafard	1986-1987 & 1989-1990	7.09
3	(England)	Brian Biddulph	1992-1993 & 1994-1995	6.90
4	(England)	Kwabina Oppong-Addai	2005–2007 & 2010-2011	6.50
5	(Lithuania)	Romanas Fedotovas	2005-2009 & 2011-2014	5.60
6	(Northern Ireland)	Paul O'Neill	2005–2008 inclusive	4.78
7	(United States)	Barry Smith	1987-1988, 1990-1991 & 1992-1993	4.08
8	(England)	Mark Salisbury	1989-1991 & 1992-1993	3.79
9	(Canada)	Paul Grech	1993-1995 inclusive	3.78
10	(Finland)	Kimmo Lahtinen	1994-1995	3.56

=== Top ten save percentages ===
League, Cup & Play Offs; as at end of 2021/22 Season (Players with under 20 appearances not included)

Player
No.	Nat.	Player	Active Seasons	Sav
1	(England)	James Tipple	2010-2011 & 2014-2016	88.48
2	(Finland)	Vesa Pennanen	1985-1987 inclusive	87.18
3	(England)	Aaron Mallet	2012–2015 inclusive	86.66
4	(England)	Steven Grout	2011-2013, 2014-2016 & 2018-2019	85.77
5	(England)	James Andrew	2016–2020 inclusive	85.12
6	(England)	George Alley	2005-2009, 2010–2012, 2013–2014 & 2016-2017	84.32
7	(Wales)	Stefan Nubert	2005–2007 inclusive	84.05
8	(Canada)	Jim Graves	1990-1992 inclusive	83.31
9	(Japan) (United Kingdom)	Naomi Healey	2019-2022 inclusive	83.15
10	(England)	Andrew Boot	2006–2009 inclusive	82.09

=== Retired numbers ===
Player
Number	Nat.	Player	Active Seasons	Acquired
2	(England)	Eddie Joseph	1984-1993 & 2005-2006	1984 from London Allstars

=== Head coaches ===
Coach
Nat.	Coach	Active Seasons	Acquired
(England)	Dave Wurthman	1984-1985	n/a First Head Coach Position
(England)	Will Fish	1985-1988	n/a First Head Coach Position
(Canada)	Lloyd Clifford	1988-1990	1988 from Richmond Flyers
(England)	Alec Goldstone	1990-1991	1990 from Richmond Flyers
(United States)	Glen Goldstein	1991-1992	n/a First Head Coach Position
(South Africa)	Lindsey Miles	1992-1994	n/a First Head Coach Position
(England)	Steve James	1994-1995 (Player-Coach)	n/a First Head Coach Position
(England)	Eddie Joseph	2005-2006 (Player-Coach)	n/a First Head Coach Position
(Russia)	Sergi Smolenko	2006-2009	2006 from London Dragons University Ice Hockey Club
(England)	Ian Prince	2009-2010	n/a First Head Coach Position
(England)	David Richards	2010-2012	2010 from London Racers
(England)	Gary Dodds	2012-2016	n/a First Head Coach Position
(England)	George Alley	2016-2018	2016 from Chelmsford Cobras
(England)	James Joseph	2018-	n/a First Head Coach Position

=== General Managers ===
Coach
Nat.	General Manager	Active Seasons	Acquired
(England)	Mike Smith	1984-1988	n/a First General Manager Position
(England)	Terry Locks	1988-1990	1988 from Lee Valley Lions (Assistant General Manager)
(England)	Steve James	1990-1995	n/a First General Manager Position
(England)	Eddie Joseph	2005-2022	n/a First General Manager Position

=== Club captains ===
Captain
Nat.	Captain	Active Seasons as Captain	Acquired
(England)	Andy Leggatt	1985-1987 (Career with club 1985-1987 inclusive)	1985 from Streatham Redskins
(England)	Lee Whale	1987-1989 (Career with club 1986–1991)	1986 from Solihull Barons
(Canada)	Kurt Wickenheiser	1989-1990 (Career with club 1989-1990 inclusive)	1989 from Richmond Flyers
(England)	Steve James	1990-1991 (Career with club 1989-1995 inclusive)	1989 from Streatham Redskins
(England)	Tony Goldstone	1991-1992 (Career with club 1990–1992)	1990 from Medway Bears
(Canada)	Darcy Cahill	1993-1994 (Career with club 1993–1994)	1993 from St Thomas Wildcats (Canada)
(Finland)	Kimmo Lahtinen	1994-1995 (Career with club 1994–1995)	1994 from HPK (Finland)
(England)	James Hatfull	2006-2007 (Career with club 2006–2015)	2006 from Chelmsford Chieftains
(Canada) (United States)	Scott Pollak	2007-2008 (Career with club 2007–2008)	2007 from Quinnipiac University Bobcats (USA)
(England)	Michael Ranby	2008-2009 (Career with club 2005–2009)	2005 from Lee Valley Lion Junior Ice Hockey Club
(England)	James Hatfull	2009-2014 (Career with club 2006–2015)	2006 from Medway Bears
(England)	James Hepburn	2014-2015 (Career with club 2013-2015 & 2016–2017)	2013 from Free Agent
(England)	Nick Alley	2015-2018 (Career with club 2007-2009 & 2013–2018)	2007 from Haringey Greyhounds
(England)	Simon Jones	2018-2022 (Career with club 2015–2022)	2015 from Free Agent

== Season-by-season record ==
Lee Valley Lions season-by-season record

Season	League	GP	W	T	L	OTL	PTS	GF	GA	League Position
1984-85	BD1	20	11	0	9	–	22	133	130	6th
1985-86	BD1	22	17	2	3	–	36	236	112	2nd
1986-87	BD1	30	14	1	15	–	29	337	307	9th
1987-88	BD1	27	7	1	19	–	15	206	294	7th
1988-89	BD1	24	8	3	13	–	19	193	213	10th
1989-90	BD1	32	6	1	25	–	13	205	315	9th
1990-91	BD1	40	8	1	31	–	17	228	389	11th
1991-92	BD1	36	10	2	24	–	22	227	297	8th
1992-93	BD1	32	3	2	27	–	8	195	483	9th
1993-94	BD1	44	14	1	29	–	29	330	451	6th
1994-95	BD1	44	5	1	38	–	11	191	498	12th
2005–06	ENL	20	0	0	20	–	0	46	162	11th
2006–07	ENL	22	5	2	15	–	12	83	166	10th
2007–08	ENL	18	7	0	11	-	14	85	109	7th
2008–09	ENL2	32	8	3	21	-	19	121	191	8th
2009–10	ENL2	20	2	0	18	-	4	45	222	10th
2010–11	ENL2	24	8	3	13	-	19	105	147	11th
2011–12	ENL2	24	9	3	12	-	19	108	127	7th
2012–13	NIHL2	22	0	0	22	-	0	61	193	12th
2013–14	NIHL2	22	6	3	13	-	15	73	110	9th
2014–15	NIHL2	20	5	1	14	-	11	67	110	5th
2015–16	NIHL2	18	5	1	12	-	11	53	102	4th
2016–17	NIHL2	20	6	2	12	-	14	63	85	5th
2017–18	NIHL2	26	1	–	22	2	5	70	207	14th
2018–19	NIHL2	28	1	–	27	0	2	65	306	15th
2019–20	NIHL2	20	0	-	20	1	1	43	163	6th
2021–22	NIHL2	22	2	-	20	0	4	28	208	12th

Note: GP = Games played; W = Wins; L = Losses; T = Ties; OTL = Overtime Losses; PTS = Points; GF = Goals For; GA = Goals Against
