= Solway Sharks =

Solway IHC
- City: Dumfries, Scotland
- League: NIHL
- Division: National League
- Founded: 1998
- Home arena: Dumfries Ice Bowl; Capacity: 1,000; Ice size: 184 feet x 95 feet
- Colours: Blue & White
- General manager: Jamie Thomson
- Head coach: Martin Grubb
- Captain: Liam Stenton
- Affiliates: Glasgow Clan, EIHL; Solway Sharks SNL, SNL; Solway Sharks Ladies, WNIHL 1 North
- Website: solwayihc.com

Franchise history
- 1998 - 2025: Solway Sharks
- 2026 - present: Solway IHC

Solway IHC, formerly Solway Sharks, is a Scottish professional ice hockey club playing out of Dumfries Ice Bowl, Dumfries. Since 2023, Solway have been the sole Scottish club in the English National Ice Hockey League pyramid.

Formed in 1998 following the demise of the BNL's Dumfries Vikings, the Sharks joined the third-tier Scottish First Division, winning the championship in their debut season and the following 1999–2000 season. In the early 2000s the club found success in knockout tournaments, winning the Scottish Cup, Scottish Spring Cup and Scottish Autumn Cup between 2003 and 2006, and finishing runners-up in the 2006–07 play-offs. After joining the revived cross-border Northern League, they would win the regular season championship in 2009 and 2010, with a play-off championship in the latter year, before the league's collapse saw a move into the ENIHL Northern Second Division in 2011.

The Sharks won the regular season championship in their first year in the English system, as well as the cross-border Northern Cup. They moved up to the Northern First Division a year later, winning the league in 2012–13, as well as a second successive Northern Cup. The club would consolidate its position at this level for the rest of the decade, with further success in the 2013–14 and 2016–17 championships.

Following the cancelled 2020–21 season due to the COVID-19 pandemic, the Sharks captured their fourth NIHL Northern First Division title in the 2021–22 season. Victories over Whitley Warriors in the NIHL Northern play-off final at Leeds, and the First Division final over southern champions Streatham IHC at the Coventry Skydome, saw the club complete a treble. A year later, the club retained all three trophies, adding the Northern Cup to complete a quadruple, again beating Streatham in the national final at Coventry.

For the 2023–24 season, the Sharks moved up to the NIHL National division, the second-tier of British ice hockey. Ahead of the 2025–26 season, Solway announced the creation of Solway Sharks SNL, an affiliate development club playing in the Scottish National League.

In April 2026, the Sharks were evicted from the Dumfries and Galloway council-owned Ice Bowl in a dispute over payments. Two months later, a new ownership group, using the name Solway IHC, was approved by the council to operate from the Ice Bowl as members of the NIHL for the 2026–27 season. The SNL team remains at the arena under the Sharks monikor.

== Honours ==
- National Ice Hockey League Division One champions: 2021–22, 2022–23
- National Ice Hockey League (North) Division One regular season champions: 2012–13, 2013–14, 2016–17, 2021–22, 2022–23
- National Ice Hockey League (North) Division One Play-Off champions 2013–14, 2021–22, 2022–23
- English National League (North) Division Two champions: 2011–12
- Northern Cup winners: 2011–12, 2012–13, 2013–14, 2022–23
- Northern League regular season champions: 2008–09, 2009–10
- Northern League Play-Off champions: 2009–10
- Scottish First Division champions: 1998–99, 1999–00
- Scottish Cup winners: 2003–04
- Spring Cup winners: 2003–04, 2005–06
- Autumn Cup winners: 2004–05
- St Andrews Cup winners: 2001–02, 2002–03, 2005–06, 2007–08, 2008–09, 2009–10, 2010–11
- Dumfries Tournament winners: 2005–06, 2009–10
- Dumfries and Galloway Sports Personalities of the Year: 1998–99

== Club roster 2022-23 ==
(*) Denotes a Non-British Trained player (Import)

Netminders
No.	Nat.	Player	Catches	Date of birth	Place of birth	Acquired	Contract
30	(Scotland)	Calum Hepburn	L	27 February 1997 (age 29)	Dumfries, Scotland	2015 from Worcester Academy	22/23

Defencemen
No.	Nat.	Player	Shoots	Date of birth	Place of birth	Acquired	Contract
6	(Scotland)	Stuart Kerr	R	30 June 1998 (age 28)	Dumfries, Scotland	2014 from Solway U20	22/23
11	(England)	Christian Johnson	R	16 October 1994 (age 32)	Newcastle, England	2021 from Aberdeen Lynx	22/23
21	(Northern Ireland)	Kell Beattie	R	28 February 2004 (age 22)	Belfast, Northern Ireland	2021 from Belfast U20	Two-Way
49	(Scotland)	Liam Danskin	L	19 July 2000 (age 26)	Kirkcaldy, Scotland	2021 from Kirkcaldy Kestrels	22/23
51	(Scotland)	Struan Tonnar Captain'C'	R	28 April 1990 (age 36)	Dumfries, Scotland	2005	22/23
91	(England)	Richard Bentham	R	19 July 1990 (age 36)	Bolton, England	2021 from Leeds Chiefs	22/23
92	(Northern Ireland)	Travis Lavery	R	29 October 2003 (age 22)	Belfast, Northern Ireland	2022 from Belfast SNL Giants	22/23

Forwards
No.	Nat.	Player	Shoots	Date of birth	Place of birth	Acquired	Contract
9	(Scotland)	Ruairi Lockerbie	R	3 April 2000 (age 26)	Dumfries, Scotland	2018 from Ontario Hockey Academy U18	22/23
10	(Scotland)	Kyle Carruth	R	24 July 2006 (age 20)	Dumfries, Scotland	2022 from Solway U19	22/23
12	(Scotland)	Jonathan McBean	L	21 December 2003 (age 22)	Dundee, Scotland	2022 from Dundee Comets	Two-Way
14	(Scotland)	Lewis Young	R	14 November 2002 (age 23)	Irvine, Scotland	2022 from Vasas SC U21	22/23
15	(Scotland)	Kieran Hair	L	6 January 2000 (age 26)	Dumfries, Scotland	2016 from Solway U16	22/23
16	(Scotland)	Lewis Houston	R	9 April 2001 (age 25)	Dumfries, Scotland	2021 from Leeds Chiefs	22/23
22	(Scotland)	Andrew Craik	R	22 April 2003 (age 23)	Dumfries, Scotland	2019 from Solway U20	22/23
25	(Scotland)	Connor Henderson	R	5 November 1997 (age 28)	Dumfries, Scotland	2022	22/23
28	(Scotland)	Gordon Horne	R	5 March 1989 (age 37)	Aberdeen, Scotland	2019 from Solway Stingrays	22/23
45	(Scotland)	Scott Crane	R	14 December 2000 (age 25)	Dumfries, Scotland	2019 from North Ayrshire Wild	22/23
68	(Scotland)	Callum Boyd	R	16 November 1993 (age 32)	Irvine, Scotland	2021 from Murrayfield Racers	22/23
86	(Scotland)	Connor McNulty	R	16 April 2005 (age 21)	Irvine, Scotland	2022 from Kilmarnock Thunder	Two-Way
89	(Scotland)	Scott Henderson	R	8 December 1998 (age 27)	Dumfries, Scotland	2014	Two-Way
90	(Scotland)	Ross Murray	R	2 November 1993 (age 32)	Dumfries, Scotland	2021 from Whitley Warriors	22/23

Team Staff
No.	Nat.	Name	Acquired	Role	Place of birth	Joined from
	(Scotland)	Martin Grubb	1998/99	Head coach	Kirkcaldy, Scotland
	(Scotland)	Jamie Thomson	2017/18	Assistant coach	Dumfries, Scotland	Scotland U17, EIHA Conference
	(Scotland)	Andrew Glen	2022/23	General Manager	Dechmont, Scotland
	(Scotland)	James Stenton	2019/20	Equipment Manager	Scotland
	(England)	James Hutchinson	2022/23	Team Consultant	Tynemouth, England

== 2021/22 Outgoing ==
Outgoing
No.	Nat.	Player	Shoots	Date of birth	Place of birth	Leaving For
1	(Scotland)	Harry Elder		20 August 2003 (age 23)	Perth, Scotland	Edinburgh Capitals, SNL
7	(Scotland)	Scott Rae		2003 (age 19)	Scotland	Paisley Pirates, SNL
17	(Scotland)	Michael Thomson		8 August 1980 (age 46)	Scotland	Retired
18	(Scotland)	Ben Coughtrie	L	6 July 2000 (age 26)	Irvine, Scotland	Edinburgh Capitals, SNL
33	(Scotland)	Euan Simpson	L	16 February 2000 (age 26)	Kirkcaldy, Scotland	Glasgow Clan, EIHL
