= Peter Russell (ice hockey) =

Scottish ice hockey player & coach (born 1974)

- Born: 20 June 1974 (age 52) Ayr, Scotland
- Height: 5 ft 11 in (180 cm)
- Weight: 172 lb (78 kg; 12 st 4 lb)
- Position: Goaltender
- Caught: Left
- Played for: Ayr Raiders; Medway Bears; Dumfries Vikings; Blackburn Hawks; Slough Jets; Paisley Pirates; Castlereagh Knights; Nottingham Panthers
- National team: Great Britain
- Playing career: 1990–1998

Peter Russell (born 20 June 1974) is a Scottish ice hockey coach and former goaltender. He is currently the head coach of Milton Keynes Lightning and Great Britain men's national ice hockey team.

He is the most successful coach in Great Britain history at both senior and junior level, with 13 World Championship medals including 8 gold medals. He has also competed with Great Britain’s Men 5 times in IIHF top division Pool A during the past years.

== Professional career ==
=== Playing career ===
Russell made his debut with the Ayr Raiders during 1990 in the British Hockey League. In 1992, Pete moved to British Division 1, the country's then-second-tier league, playing for the Medway Bears, Dumfries Vikings, Blackburn Hawks, Slough Jets and the Paisley Pirates. In 1996, Russell played for the Castlereagh Knights followed by a second spell with the Paisley Pirates again. He then played one game for the Nottingham Panthers in the British Ice Hockey Superleague before retiring at the age of 24.

=== Coaching career ===
Russell debuted as Head Coach with the Paisley Cherokees in the 2002–03 season in the Scotland U19 league, before moving to the Cardiff Devils as Director of Player Development. In the 2006–07 season he was made Head Coach of the English Premier League team, the Swindon Wildcats. He had spells with other Premier League teams the Bracknell Bees and Slough Jets, before returning to Swindon as Assistant Coach of the Premier League team and Head Coach of the Okanagan Hockey Academy based in Swindon.

On 22 April 2015, Russell was announced as the head coach of the Milton Keynes Lightning for the 2015–16 season, replacing the previous long-term coach, Nick Poole. He led them to memorable playoff and cup doubles in the 2016–17 season, before leading them in their inaugural season in the Elite League. In February 2018, the Lightning announced that Russell would leave the team at the end of the season.

On 8 April 2018, Russell was announced as head coach of the Glasgow Clan, replacing John Tripp.

Between 2003 and 2015, he led GB's junior sides to seven medals at World Championship tournaments, including four gold medals. Since taking over for Great Britain Men in 2014–15, Russell led GB to two successive silver medals at the World Championship Division I Group B in his first two seasons in charge of the national team. In 2017, he won gold on home ice and promotion to the second tier.

In 2018, he led GB to a memorable gold in Hungary in the World Championship Division I Group A to secure a top-flight World Championship place for 2019. Russell then led Great Britain to a dramatic overtime victory over France at the 2019 IIHF World Championship, which preserved their top-flight status. GB retained their top-level status until relegation in 2022.

In May 2019, it was announced that Russell had left the Glasgow Clan, and would be joining EHC Freiburg in the DEL2, taking over from Jan Melichar.

In March 2021, it was announced that Russell would leave Freiburg at the end of the current campaign and take over at fellow DEL2 side Ravensburg Towerstars ahead of the 2021–22 season.

In April 2022, after leading Ravensburg to the DEL2 play-offs, Russell was named the new head coach at DEL side Augsburger Panthers for the 2022–23 season. However, in December 2022, Augsburger and Russell parted company.

In January 2023, Russell returned to Ravensburg Towerstars for a second spell as head coach.

On 12 May 2023, the Elite Ice Hockey League team Cardiff Devils announced that Russell had signed an initial two-year deal as head coach of the team.

In April 2025, Russell left Cardiff Devils to become head coach of EC Bad Nauheim in Germany's DEL2.

In March 2026, Russell became head coach of Milton Keynes Lightning.

== Honours and awards ==
- 2005/06 – IIHF Under 20s World Championships Division 2 Gold with Team GB
- 2006/07 – IIHF Under 20s World Championships Division 1 Bronze with Team GB
- 2008/09 – IIHF Under 20s World Championships Division 2 Silver with Team GB
- 2009/10 – IIHF Under 20s World Championships Division 2 Gold with Team GB
- 2009/10 – EPIHL Playoff Champions with Slough Jets
- 2009/10 – EPIHL Coach of the Season
- 2010/11 – IIHF Under 20s World Championships Division 1 Bronze with Team GB
- 2010/11 – EPIHL Cup winners with the Slough Jets
- 2014/15 – IIHF Under 20s World Championships Division 1B Gold with Team GB
- 2014/15 – IIHF World Championship Division 1B Silver with Team GB
- 2015/16 – IIHF World Championship Division 1B Silver with Team GB
- 2016/17 – EPIHL Playoff Champions with Milton Keynes Lightning
- 2016/17 – IIHF World Championship Division 1B Gold with Team GB
- 2017/18 – IIHF World Championship Division 1A Gold with Team GB
- 2019/20 – DEL2 Coach of the Year with EHC Freiburg
- 2022/23 – IIHF World Championship Division 1A Gold with Team GB
- 2024/25 – IIHF Continental Cup Winners with Cardiff Devils
- 2024/25 – IIHF World Championship Division 1A Gold with Team GB

Preceded by Nick Poole	Milton Keynes Lightning Head Coach; 2015-2016	Succeeded by Current Incumbent
