= Hockey in Scotland =

Hockey in Scotland may refer to:

== Field hockey ==
- Scottish Hockey Union
- Scottish Hockey National Leagues
- Scotland men's national field hockey team
- Scotland women's national field hockey team

== Ice hockey ==
- Ice hockey in Scotland
- Scottish Ice Hockey
