= Mikko Niemi =

Mikko Niemi may refer to:

- Mikko Niemi (basketball) (born 1985), Finnish basketball player
- Mikko Niemi (ice hockey) (born 1972), Finnish ice hockey player
