= Murrayfield Racers (2018) =

Scottish ice hockey team

- City: Edinburgh, Scotland
- League: Scottish National League (SNL)
- Founded: 2018
- Operated: 2018–2022
- Home arena: Murrayfield Ice Rink; Capacity: 3800; Ice size: 200 ft × 97 ft
- Owner: (Scotland) Tony Hand / Willie Dunn
- General manager: (Scotland) Martin Gill
- Head coach: (Slovakia) Martin Cingel (Scotland) Jock Hay (Scotland) Tony Hand
- Website: http://www.mracers.com (website not under racers last archive under racers here: https://web.archive.org/web/20230410044416/http://www.mracers.com/ )

The Murrayfield Racers were an ice hockey team founded in 2018 and based in Edinburgh, Scotland who played in the Scottish National League (SNL).

== History ==
The original Murrayfield Racers were founded in 1952 as the Murrayfield Royals, becoming the Racers in 1966. The team continued to represent the Scottish Capital until they fell into financial troubles and folded in 1996. They were replaced by the Edinburgh Capitals who were a member of the United Kingdom's premier ice hockey league, the EIHL, until they folded in 2018.

The second incarnation of the Murrayfield Racers was founded in 2018 and were awarded the Murrayfield Ice Rink contract in the April of that year. The Racers applied for entry in to the EIHL for the 2018–2019 season but were ultimately denied entry and the Capitals, now with no home venue, ceased operations at the end of the 2017–2018 EIHL season.

In June 2018, the Racers were accepted in to the Scottish National League to represent Edinburgh for the 2018–2019 season, while representing the city in the NIHL North Cup, playing their home games at the Murrayfield Ice Rink. Murrayfield withdrew from the SNL for the 2021-22 season.

In July 2022, the ice contract at Murrayfield Ice Rink was awarded to the revived Edinburgh Capitals, coached by Steven Lynch. The Capitals would take the spot vacated by the Racers, beginning with the 2022-23 Scottish National League season.

== Club roster 2020–21 ==
Netminders
No.	Nat.	Player	Catches	Date of birth	Place of birth	Acquired	Contract
1	(Scotland)	Harry Elder	-	2003 (17)	Scotland	2019 from Kirkcaldy Kestrels	20/21
35	(Scotland)	Craig Douglas	L	17 September 1989 (age 36)	Kirkcaldy, Scotland	2019 from Fife Flyers	20/21
TBA	(Scotland)	Euan Simpson	L	16 February 2000 (age 25)	Kirkcaldy, Scotland	2020 from Kirkcaldy Kestrels	20/21

Defencemen
No.	Nat.	Player	Shoots	Date of birth	Place of birth	Acquired	Contract
3	(Scotland)	Dean Walker		3 January 1997 (age 29)	Scotland	2018 from Edinburgh Capitals (SNL)	20/21
8	(Scotland)	Martyn Simpson	R	27 July 1998 (age 27)	Kirkcaldy, Scotland	2019 from Kirkcaldy Kestrels	20/21
16	(Scotland)	Liam Danskin	L	19 July 2000 (age 25)	Kirkcaldy, Scotland	2019 from Kirkcaldy Kestrels	20/21
21	(Germany)	Alex Christian	L	12 August 1993 (age 32)	Dachau, Germany	2019 from Unattached	20/21
23	(England) (Switzerland)	Jack Wright	L	18 April 1999 (age 26)	Penrith, England	2019 from HC Villars (Switzerland)	20/21
33	(Scotland)	Scott Geddes	R	11 July 1993 (age 32)	Kirkcaldy, Scotland	2018 from Dundee Tigers	20/21
43	(Scotland)	Ethan Reid	R	3 July 2002 (age 23)	Scotland	2015 from North Ayrshire Predators	20/21
78	(Latvia)	Rihards Grigors	L	20 January 1992 (age 34)	Dobele, Latvia	2019 from Milton Keynes Lightning	20/21
TBA	(Scotland)	Aiden Paterson		2004 (16)	Scotland	2020 from Lanarkshire Lightning/Fife Falcons	20/21

Forwards
No.	Nat.	Player	Shoots	Date of birth	Place of birth	Acquired	Contract
4	(Scotland)	Ross Borwick	-	2000 (20)	Scotland	2018 from Edinburgh Capitals (SNL)	20/21
10	(Scotland)	Steven Clark	R	20 March 1996 (age 29)	Scotland	2018 from Edinburgh Capitals (SNL)	20/21
15	(Scotland)	Archie Holmes	-	2 May 2003 (age 22)	Longniddry, Scotland	2017 from King's Edgehill School (Canada)	20/21
19	(Scotland)	Lewis Gold	L	8 January 1992 (age 34)	Broxburn, Scotland	2019 from Dundee Comets	20/21
22	(Scotland)	Garry Simpson	L	9 July 2000 (age 25)	Kirkcaldy, Scotland	2019 from Dundee Comets	20/21
42	(Scotland)	Michael Ireland	R	6 November 1996 (age 29)	Edinburgh, Scotland	2018 from Edinburgh Capitals	20/21
88	(Scotland)	Kieran Black	R	6 January 1995 (age 31)	Edinburgh, Scotland	2019 from Unattached	20/21
89	(Scotland)	Callum Boyd	R	16 November 1993 (age 32)	Irvine, Scotland	2018 from Edinburgh Capitals	20/21
92	(Latvia)	Rolands Dietlavs	R	30 January 1992 (age 34)	Latvia	2020 from HC Zemgale/LUA (Latvia)	20/21
TBA	(Scotland)	Chad Smith	R	18 March 1999 (age 26)	Kirkcaldy, Scotland	2020 from Glasgow Clan	20/21

== 2020/21 outgoing ==
Outgoing
No.	Nat.	Player	Shoots	Date of birth	Place of birth	Leaving For
29	(Scotland)	Mark McGill	L	15 November 1991 (age 34)	Broxburn, Scotland	To Be Announced

== Season record ==
Season	League	GP	W	T	L	OTW	OTL	Pts.	Rank	Postseason
2018-2019	SNL	16	14	2	0	-	-	30	1st	Final Loss
2019-2020	SNL	15	13	0	1	0	1	29	2nd	Playoffs Cancelled
