= Player of the Year Trophy (IHJUK) =

British ice hockey award

The Player of the Year Trophy was an award given by Ice Hockey Journalists UK (formally the British Ice Hockey Writers Association) to the MVP in the Elite League and the National League at the end of each season. In previous seasons it has been awarded to players in the British Hockey League's Premier and First Divisions, the Super League, the British National League, and the English Premier League. The trophy was first awarded in 1985.

Tony Hand has won the trophy the most times, with a total of six awards. Steve Moria has won four times. Kieran Brown, Rick Fera, Joey Martin, Mark Morrison, Scott Morrison, Lukas Smital, Randy Smith and Matthew Greenfield have each won the trophy on two occasions.

== Player of the Year Trophy winners ==
	Premier Division	First Division
1984-85	(Canada) Dave Stoyanovich (Fife Flyers)	Not awarded
1985-86	(Canada) Tim Salmon (Ayr Bruins)	(Canada) Brad Schnurr (Solihull Barons)
1986-87	(Canada) Rick Fera (Murrayfield Racers)	(Canada) Garry Unger (Peterborough Pirates)
1987-88	(Canada) Scott Morrison (Whitley Warriors)	(Canada) Kevin Conway (Telford Tigers)
1988-89	(United Kingdom) Tony Hand (Murrayfield Racers)	(Canada) Luc Chabot (Medway Bears)
1989-90	(Canada) Steve Moria (Cardiff Devils)	(Canada) Gerard Waslen (Telford Tigers)
1990-91	(Canada) Rick Brebant (Durham Wasps)	(Canada) Scott Morrison (Humberside Seahawks)
1991-92	(United States) Dan Dorion (Nottingham Panthers)	(Canada) Richard Laplante (Fife Flyers)
1992-93	(United Kingdom) Tony Hand (Murrayfield Racers)	(Canada) Rick Fera (Basingstoke Beavers)
1993-94	(Canada) Doug Smail (Fife Flyers)	(Republic of Ireland) Patrick Scott (Milton Keynes Kings)
1994-95	(Canada) Randy Smith (Peterborough Pirates)	(Canada) Steve Moria (Swindon Wildcats)
1995-96	(Canada) Randy Smith (Cardiff Devils)	(Canada) Shawn Byram (Manchester Storm)
	Super League	British League
1996-97	(United Kingdom) Steve Lyle (Cardiff Devils)	(Canada) Claude Dumas (Telford Tigers) (Canada) Mark Morrison (Fife Flyers)
1997-98	(Canada) Rob Dopson (Ayr Scottish Eagles)	(Canada) Mark Morrison (Fife Flyers)
1998-99	(Canada) Frank Pietrangelo (Manchester Storm)	(Canada) Perry Pappas (Slough Jets)
1999-00	(Canada) Ed Courtenay (Sheffield Steelers)	(United Kingdom) Stephen Murphy (Fife Flyers)
2000-01	(United Kingdom) David Longstaff (Sheffield Steelers)	(Canada) Mark McArthur (Guildford Flames)
2001-02	(Canada) Kevin Riehl (Belfast Giants)	(United Kingdom) Tony Hand (Dundee Texol Stars)
2002-03	(Canada) Joel Laing (Sheffield Steelers)	(Canada) Jody Lehman (Coventry Blaze)
	Elite League	British League
2003-04	(Canada) Jason Ruff (Belfast Giants)	(United Kingdom) Tony Hand (Edinburgh Capitals)
2004-05	(United Kingdom) Tony Hand (Belfast Giants) (Canada) Neal Martin (Coventry Blaze)	(Czech Republic) Lukas Smital (Bracknell Bees)
Season	Elite League	Premier League
2005-06	(Canada) Theo Fleury (Belfast Giants)	(Canada) Kyle Amyotte (Romford Raiders)
2006-07	(Canada) Mark Smith (Cardiff Devils)	(Czech Republic) Lukas Smital (Bracknell Bees)
2007-08	(Canada) Adam Calder (Coventry Blaze)	(Canada) Steve Moria (Slough Jets)
2008–09	(Canada) David Beauregard (Manchester Phoenix)	(Canada) Steve Moria (Slough Jets)
2009-10	(United Kingdom) Colin Shields (Belfast Giants)	(Czech Republic) Jaroslav Cesky (Bracknell Bees)
2010-11	(Canada) Craig Weller (Cardiff Devils)	(United Kingdom) Tony Hand (Manchester Phoenix)
2011-12	(Canada) Jade Galbraith (Braehead Clan)	(Latvia) Janis Ozolins (Sheffield Steeldogs)
2012-13	(Canada) David Ling (Nottingham Panthers)	(Sweden) Jonas Hoog (Swindon Wildcats)
2013-14	(Canada) Dan Bakala (Dundee Stars)	(United Kingdom) Luke Boothroyd (Manchester Phoenix)
2014-15	(Canada) Mathieu Roy (Sheffield Steelers)	(Slovakia) Peter Szabo (Telford Tigers)
2015-16	(Canada) Joey Martin (Cardiff Devils)	(Lithuania) Arnoldas Bosas (Sheffield Steeldogs)
Season	Elite League	National League (UK)
2016-17	(Canada) Andrew Hotham (Cardiff Devils)	Not awarded
2017-18	(Canada) Joey Martin (Cardiff Devils)	Not awarded
2018-19	(Canada) Tyler Beskorowany (Belfast Giants)	Not awarded
2019-20	Not awarded due to COVID-19	(United Kingdom) Jason Hewitt (Hull Pirates)
2020-21	Not awarded due to COVID-19	Not awarded
2021-22	(United States) J.J. Piccinich (Belfast Giants)	(United Kingdom) Kieran Brown (Leeds Knights)
2022-23	(United Kingdom) Scott Conway (Belfast Giants)	(United Kingdom) Kieran Brown (Leeds Knights)
2023-24	(United States) Matthew Greenfield (Sheffield Steelers)	Not awarded
2024-25	(United States) Matthew Greenfield (Sheffield Steelers)	(Canada) Owen Sobchak (Hull Seahawks)

== See also ==
- Man of Ice Awards
