= Moray Tornadoes =

- City: Elgin
- League: SNL
- Founded: 2001
- Home arena: Moray Leisure Centre

Moray Tornadoes are a Scottish ice hockey team that play in the Scottish National League. They play their games at Moray Leisure Centre in Elgin.
