= Scottish Premier Hockey League =

Ice hockey league

- Sport: Ice hockey
- Founded: 2007
- No. of teams: 5
- Country: Scotland
- Website: scottishpremierhockey.co.uk

The Scottish Premier Hockey League was an ice hockey league in Scotland. The league began play in September 2007 and consists of five teams. It replaced the Scottish National League as the highest level of competition in Scotland behind the Elite League. In addition to the Premier League, membered teams will also take part in the Northern League with teams from the Northern section of the English National Ice Hockey League.

== Teams ==
- Dundee Stars*
- Edinburgh Capitals*
- Fife Flyers*
- Paisley Pirates
- Solway Sharks
- Kilmarnock Storm
- North Ayr
- Inverness Capitals
- Dundee, Edinburgh and Fife now compete in the Elite League
