= Scottish Premiership (disambiguation) =

The Scottish Premiership is Scotland's highest level association football competition and has been since 2013.

Scottish Premiership may also refer to:

- Scottish Premiership (rugby), top division of rugby union amateur league competition in Scotland
- Scottish Hockey Premiership, top division of field hockey in Scotland
- Scottish Premier Hockey League, former top division of ice hockey in Scotland

== See also ==
- Scottish Football League Premier Division, the highest level football league competition in Scotland from 1975 to 1998
- Scottish Premier League, the highest level football league competition in Scotland from 1998 to 2013
