= Belfast SNL Giants =

- City: Belfast, Northern Ireland
- League: Scottish National League
- Founded: 2007
- Home arena: SSE Arena Belfast
- Colours: White, red & teal
- Website: www.belfastgiants.com

The Belfast SNL Giants are an amateur ice hockey team from Belfast, Northern Ireland, who compete in the Scottish National League (SNL). They are an affiliate of the Elite Ice Hockey League’s Belfast Giants.

== Club roster 2020–21 ==
Netminders
No.	Nat.	Player	Catches	Date of birth	Place of birth	Acquired	Contract

Defencemen
No.	Nat.	Player	Shoots	Date of birth	Place of birth	Acquired	Contract

Forwards
No.	Nat.	Player	Shoots	Date of birth	Place of birth	Acquired	Contract

== 2020/21 Outgoing ==
Outgoing
No.	Nat.	Player	Shoots	Date of birth	Place of birth	Leaving For

== Team staff ==
- Head Coach – Rob Stewart / Mark Morrison
- General Manager – Paul Robinson

== Affiliated teams ==
- Belfast Junior Giants (Scotland U18)
- Belfast Giants (EIHL)
