= Scottish Cup (disambiguation) =

The Scottish Cup is a knockout football tournament for men's football clubs in Scotland.

For the women's tournament see: Scottish Women's Cup.

Scottish Cup may also refer to:

- Scottish Cup (basketball)
- Scottish Cup (ice hockey)
- Scottish Cup (rugby union)
