= Scott Nichol (ice hockey) =

Canadian ice hockey player

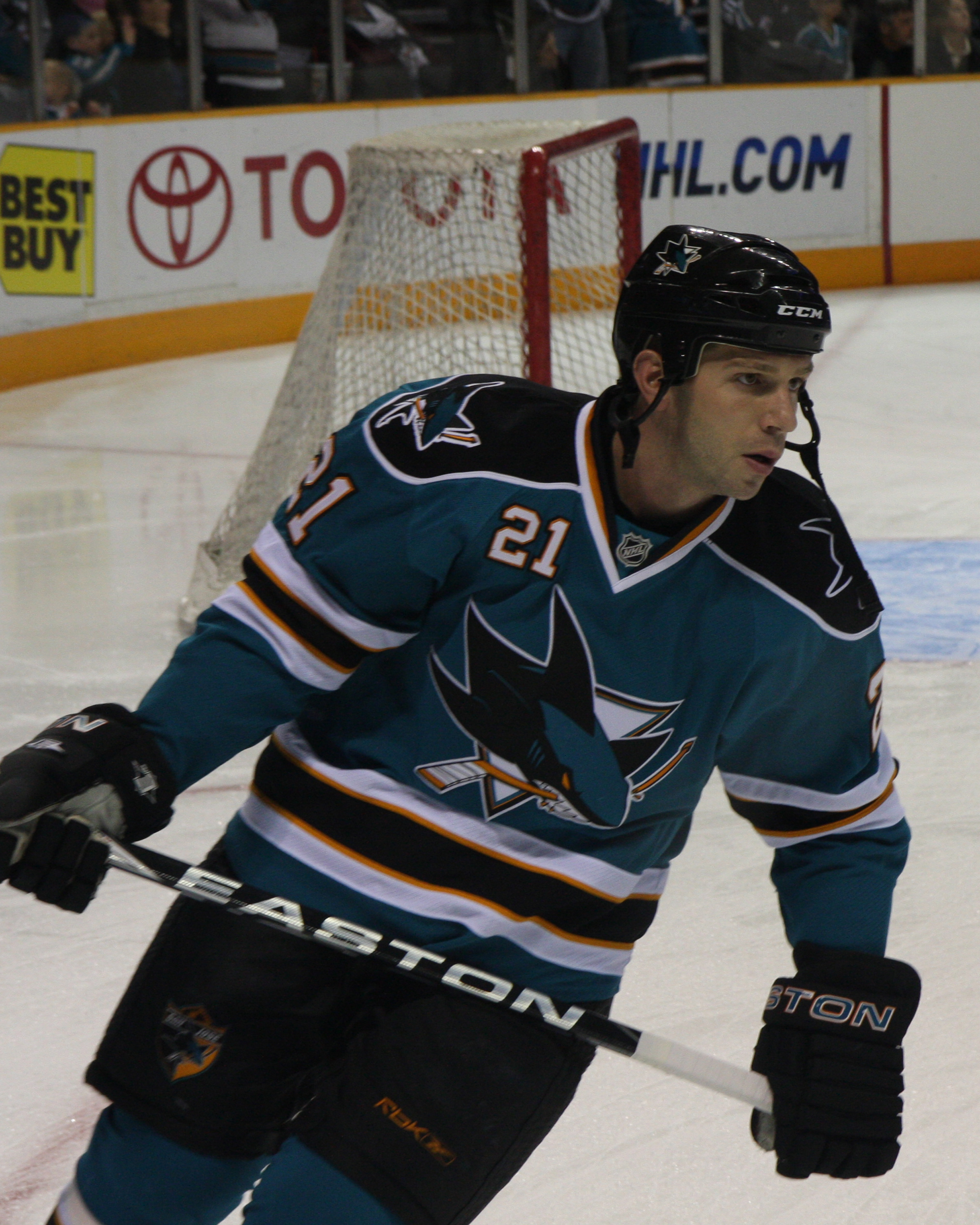
- Scott Nichol with the San Jose Sharks in 2009
- Born: December 31, 1974 (age 51) Edmonton, Alberta, Canada
- Height: 5 ft 9 in (175 cm)
- Weight: 180 lb (82 kg; 12 st 12 lb)
- Position: Centre
- Shot: Right
- Played for: Buffalo Sabres; Calgary Flames; Chicago Blackhawks; Nashville Predators; San Jose Sharks; St. Louis Blues
- NHL draft: 272nd overall, 1993; Buffalo Sabres
- Playing career: 1994–2013

Scott B. Nichol (born December 31, 1974) is a Canadian former professional ice hockey player. On June 5, 2013, he announced his retirement to accept a job as the director of player development for the Nashville Predators, where he played from 2005 to 2009. In 2018, he was promoted to the general manager of the Predators' American Hockey League affiliate, the Milwaukee Admirals.

== Playing career ==
Nichol was drafted in the 11th round, 272nd overall by the Buffalo Sabres in the 1993 NHL entry draft.

Nichol has represented the Buffalo Sabres, Calgary Flames, Chicago Blackhawks, Nashville Predators, and San Jose Sharks during his NHL career. During the NHL lockout season of 2004–05, Nichol played for the London Racers in the British Elite Ice Hockey League, scoring 28 points in 24 games. In 1996 Nichol won the Calder Cup with the Rochester Americans.

On December 21, 2006, Nichol made headlines when he blindsided Buffalo Sabres defenceman Jaroslav Spacek with a punch to the head, after he thought Spacek made a dirty hit on him. The act earned Nichol a 9-game suspension.

On December 3, 2007, he was suspended for five games for cross-checking Montreal Canadiens forward Patrice Brisebois in the back of the head in a game December 1. Nichol was declared a repeat offender under the terms of the NHL Collective Bargaining Agreement.

Nichol signed a one-year deal, US$750,000 deal with the San Jose Sharks on July 15, 2009.

On March 4, 2010, Nichol was injured when Montreal Canadiens forward Maxim Lapierre hit him on a late and dangerous hit, leaving him with an upper body injury for seven days.

On June 20, 2011, Sharks General Manager Doug Wilson announced that Nichol, and teammate Jamal Mayers, would not be resigned for the 2011–12 season. On July 5, 2011, Nichol was signed to a one-year contract with the St. Louis Blues.

Nichol announced his retirement following the lockout shortened 2012–13 season on June 5, 2013. He was appointed the head of player development with former club, the Nashville Predators, a position that had been filled by former Predator and ex-teammate Martin Gelinas. In 2018, he was named the general manager of the Predators' affiliate in the American Hockey League, the Milwaukee Admirals.

== Career statistics ==
			Regular season					Playoffs
Season	Team	League	GP	G	A	Pts	PIM	GP	G	A	Pts	PIM
1991–92	Calgary Flames AAA	AMHL	23	26	16	42	132	—	—	—	—	—
1992–93	Portland Winter Hawks	WHL	67	33	31	64	146	16	8	8	16	41
1993–94	Portland Winter Hawks	WHL	65	40	53	93	144	10	3	8	11	16
1994–95	Rochester Americans	AHL	71	11	16	27	136	5	0	3	3	14
1995–96	Rochester Americans	AHL	62	14	17	31	170	19	7	6	13	36
1995–96	Buffalo Sabres	NHL	2	0	0	0	10	—	—	—	—	—
1996–97	Rochester Americans	AHL	68	22	21	43	133	10	2	1	3	26
1997–98	Rochester Americans	AHL	35	13	7	20	113	—	—	—	—	—
1997–98	Buffalo Sabres	NHL	3	0	0	0	4	—	—	—	—	—
1998–99	Rochester Americans	AHL	52	13	20	33	120	—	—	—	—	—
1999–00	Rochester Americans	AHL	37	7	11	18	141	—	—	—	—	—
2000–01	Detroit Vipers	IHL	67	7	24	31	198	—	—	—	—	—
2001–02	Calgary Flames	NHL	60	8	9	17	107	—	—	—	—	—
2002–03	Calgary Flames	NHL	68	5	5	10	149	—	—	—	—	—
2003–04	Chicago Blackhawks	NHL	75	7	11	18	145	—	—	—	—	—
2004–05	London Racers	EIHL	10	1	7	8	70	8	2	7	9	26
2005–06	Nashville Predators	NHL	34	3	3	6	79	3	0	0	0	2
2006–07	Nashville Predators	NHL	59	7	6	13	79	5	0	0	0	17
2007–08	Nashville Predators	NHL	73	10	8	18	72	2	0	0	0	0
2008–09	Nashville Predators	NHL	43	4	6	10	41	—	—	—	—	—
2009–10	San Jose Sharks	NHL	79	4	15	19	72	15	1	1	2	17
2010–11	San Jose Sharks	NHL	56	4	3	7	50	15	0	0	0	26
2011–12	St. Louis Blues	NHL	80	3	5	8	83	9	0	1	1	14
2012–13	St. Louis Blues	NHL	30	1	0	1	25	—	—	—	—	—
AHL totals			331	83	97	180	831	34	9	10	19	76
NHL totals			662	56	71	127	916	49	1	2	3	76
