= Scottish Ice Hockey =

Governing body for ice hockey in Scotland

- Abbreviation: SIH
- Formation: 1929
- Type: National governing body
- Headquarters: Edinburgh, Scotland
- Region served: Scotland
- Chairman: John Colley
- Head of Operations: Jamie Thomson
- Affiliations: Ice Hockey UK / IIHF
- Website: siha-uk.co.uk
- Remarks: Responsible for all ice hockey in Scotland excluding EIHL teams.

Scottish Ice Hockey, abbreviated to SIH, (formerly the Scottish Ice Hockey Association, abbreviated to SIHA) was responsible for the administration of all ice hockey in Scotland, with the exception of Scotland's Elite Ice Hockey League teams (currently Glasgow Clan, Fife Flyers and Dundee Stars).

The leagues and areas for which SIH were responsible were:

- Scottish Premier Hockey League
- Scottish National League
- Women's ice hockey
- SRIHC Recreational ice hockey Conference
- Junior ice hockey

They are also responsible for running coaching courses and the training and registration of on and off-ice officials.

On 30 June 2026, Scottish Ice Hockey merged with England Ice Hockey and Ice Hockey UK, to become the "First Olympic sport in Britain to fully unify governing bodies".
