= Lee Valley Ice Centre =

Ice sports centre in Leyton, London

Coordinates: 51.5636°N 0.0446°W

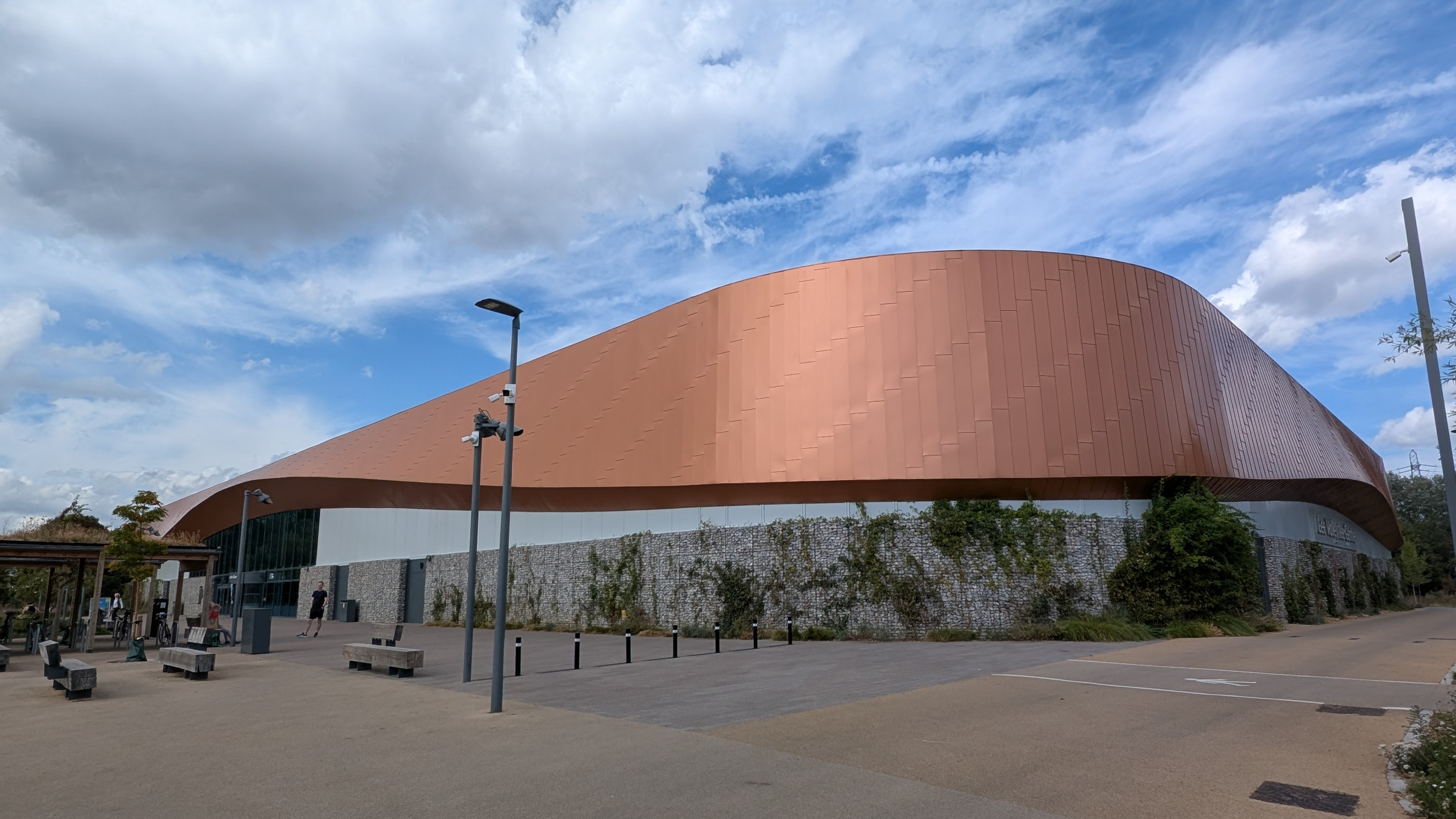
Lee Valley Ice Centre after refurbishment

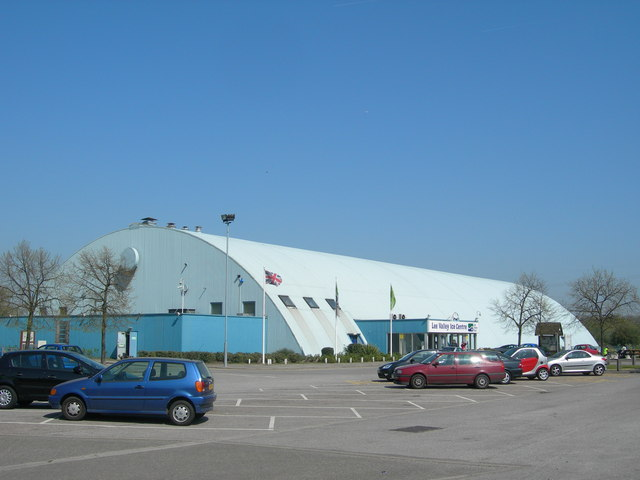
Lee Valley Ice Centre before refurbishment

The Lee Valley Ice Centre is located in Leyton in the Lower Lea Valley, London. The original venue opened in 1984, and a major redevelopment and expansion was completed in 2023. The centre now has two Olympic size (60 m × 30 m) ice rinks. It is owned by the Lee Valley Regional Park Authority, and is home to the Lee Valley Lions ice hockey team.

== History ==
The ice centre was opened in 1984 by Torvill and Dean. By the 2010s the centre was aging and unable to cope with demand, and a redevelopment was proposed. There was some opposition from environmental groups due to the impact on Leyton Marsh, but the plans were approved by Waltham Forest council.

The £30 million redevelopment was funded by the Lee Valley Regional Park Authority and the London Borough of Waltham Forest, and added a gym, dance studio and cafe together with the new ice rinks. Robin Cousins, Olympic gold medal winning figure skater and president of British Ice Skating, took part in a "soft-launch" event, before the centre opened to the public on Saturday 17 June.

== Ice hockey ==
The Lee Valley Ice Centre is home to the Lee Valley Lions, an amateur side competing in the English National Ice Hockey League. It used to also be home to the London Racers, who competed in the top-level British Elite Ice Hockey League. The Racers controversially withdrew from the league in 2005 after the club claimed that the rink was not safe enough for "elite" level ice hockey, although this was challenged by the park authority. Other clubs playing at the centre include the London Devils, and Eastern Stars IHC. The Lee Valley Vampires entered the Women's National Ice Hockey League in 2024, the first ever league women's club to play at Lee Valley.

== Additional information ==
The music video for "Sugar Coated Iceberg" by The Lightning Seeds, which featured on their 1996 album Dizzy Heights, was filmed inside Lee Valley Ice Centre. Dancing on Ice rehearsals are also occasionally filmed inside Lee Valley Ice Centre.
