= Kirkcaldy Kestrels =

- City: Kirkcaldy, Scotland
- League: SNL
- Founded: 1984
- Home arena: Fife Ice Arena
- Colors
- Head coach: Steven Wishart

The Kirkcaldy Kestrels are a Scottish ice hockey team that play in the Scottish National League. They play their games at Fife Ice Arena in Kirkcaldy.

== Club roster 2020–21 ==
Netminders
No.	Nat.	Player	Catches	Date of birth	Place of birth	Acquired	Contract
TBA	(Scotland)	Craig Chalmers	L	26 December 1994 (age 31)	Kirkcaldy, Scotland	2020 from Aberdeen Lynx	20/21

Defencemen
No.	Nat.	Player	Shoots	Date of birth	Place of birth	Acquired	Contract
8	(Scotland)	Ethan Meldrum	L	31 December 2000 (age 25)	Scotland	2019 from Fife Falcons	20/21
27	(Scotland)	Andrew Thomson	R	17 January 2004 (age 22)	Scotland	2019 from Fife Falcons	20/21
28	(Scotland)	Iain Quinn	R	28 February 1992 (age 33)	Scotland	2011 from Ontario Hockey Academy U18	20/21
51	(Scotland)	Steven MacDonald	R	5 November 1985 (age 40)	Kirkcaldy, Scotland	2019 from Unattached	20/21
TBA	(Scotland)	Kyle Horne	L	30 September 1980 (age 45)	Kirkcaldy, Scotland	2020 from Solway Sharks	20/21

Forwards
No.	Nat.	Player	Shoots	Date of birth	Place of birth	Acquired	Contract
6	(Scotland)	Jake Grubb	L	28 December 2003 (age 22)	Scotland	2019 from Fife Falcons	20/21
9	(Scotland)	George Pitcaithly	R	23 July 2001 (age 24)	Kirkcaldy, Scotland	2017 from Fife Falcons	20/21
12	(Scotland)	Finley King	L	22 June 2003 (age 22)	Scotland	2019 from Fife Falcons	20/21
17	(Scotland)	Andrew Finlay	L	7 September 1978 (age 47)	Kirkcaldy, Scotland	2019 from Unattached	20/21
18	(Scotland)	Allan Anderson	R	20 May 1989 (age 36)	Kirkcaldy, Scotland	2015 from Fife Flyers	20/21
71	(Scotland)	Grant Jamieson	R	7 December 1998 (age 27)	Kirkcaldy, Scotland	2017 from Fife Falcons	20/21
81	(Scotland)	Jamie Crawford	L	22 February 2002 (age 23)	Kirkcaldy, Scotland	2017 from Fife Falcons	20/21
88	(Scotland)	Graeme Allan	L	15 July 1996 (age 29)	Kirkcaldy, Scotland	2012 from Fife Falcons	20/21

== 2020/21 Outgoing ==
Outgoing
No.	Nat.	Player	Shoots	Date of birth	Place of birth	Leaving For
33	(Scotland)	Euan Simpson	L	16 February 2000 (age 25)	Kirkcaldy, Scotland	Murrayfield Racers
