= Haringey Greyhounds =

- Sport: Ice hockey
- Founded: 1990
- League: ENHL (1994-present); English Conference (1990-1994)
- Location: Harringay, England, UK
- Arena: Alexandra Palace

The Haringey Greyhounds are a British ice hockey club based in Harringay, England.

== History ==
The team was founded in 1990, as the second team at Alexandra Palace, the first being Haringey Racers. In 1992, Racers collapsed, leaving Greyhounds as the rink's first team. They entered the English Conference and then the English National Hockey League on its creation in 1994. The team changed its name to Haringey Racers in 2002 to signify a new start following a change of ownership/management, however their fortunes did not improve and they endured a torrid season.

The London Racers were founded at the rink the following year as part of the newly formed Elite Ice Hockey League, while the Haringey Racers continued in the EPL. However, in December 2003 it was decided, seemingly out of the blue, to relocate the London Racers away from Alexandra Palace to Lee Valley. As a result of a shortage of available ice time Lee Valley was unable to accommodate both teams, which resulted in Haringey being folded and withdrawing from the EPL.

However the Ally Pally rink was not to be without senior hockey for long with the Greyhounds being reformed a group headed by Jan Bestic ready to complete in the English National Ice Hockey League for the 2004/05 season. They have completed at that level ever since with varying degrees of success. They were crowned ENL South playoff champions in the 2006/07 season, losing out to Sheffield in the national final, marking the pinnacle of the reformed team's achievements to date. For the 2008/09 season ENL was split into two tiers, with Haringey being placed in Division One in the South, where they struggled with the new format and a general strengthening in the standard of the league. After finishing bottom of the league they were due to be relegated for the 2009/10 season, but they received a stay of execution at the EIHA's AGM when it emerged that no team was willing to step up from Division Two to replace them.

Matters on the ice did not improve for the Greyhounds and they endured another torrid season, finishing second from bottom. The poor performance of the team on and off the ice lead to a mid-season change of ownership with Nick Rothwell taking over from Jan Bestic.

During the summer of 2010 the ice rink at Alexandra Palace was refurbished at a cost of £2.3million, however due to the nature of the building work a completion date could not be guaranteed. As a result, it was decided that the team would be unable to enter the league for the 2010/11 season. They planned to return the next year renamed as the North London Hounds but this plan fell through.
