= Steve Moria =

- Born: February 3, 1961 (age 65) Vancouver, British Columbia, Canada
- Height: 5 ft 10 in (178 cm)
- Weight: 174 lb (79 kg; 12 st 6 lb)
- Position: Centre
- Shot: Left
- Played for: New Haven Nighthawks; Fife Flyers; Cardiff Devils; Nottingham Panthers; Blackburn Hawks; Swindon Wildcats; Basingstoke Bison; London Racers; Milton Keynes Lightning; Slough Jets
- National team: Great Britain
- Playing career: 1985–2012

Steve Moria (born February 3, 1961) is a British-Canadian (dual nationality) professional ice hockey player. He was born in Vancouver, British Columbia, Canada. Moria has won the IHJUK Player of the Year Trophy three times: in 1994–95, 2007–08 and 2008–09.

Moria began his professional career playing for the New Haven Nighthawks in the American Hockey League's 1985–86 season; he was the last Nighthawk active in professional ice hockey. He moved to the United Kingdom to play for the Fife Flyers in the British Premier Division's 1986–87 season. Moria's most notable affiliation is with the Welsh ice hockey team the Cardiff Devils; he spent 11 intermittent seasons playing for this team.

Internationally, Moria played for the Great British ice hockey team for five years (from the 1994–95 season through to the 1999–2000 season). Moria captained Team GB's World Championship qualification team during the 1998–99 season.

Following four seasons as player-coach with the Slough Jets, Moria was named player-coach with the Basingstoke Bison. Moria finally announced his retirement on May 11, 2012 at the age of 51.

== Awards and honours ==
Award	Year
AHCA West Second-Team All-American	1984–85

Moria was named as a British All-Star player for the British Premier Division's 1986–87 season. He recorded the most points during the British Premier Division's 1987–88 play-offs with the Fife Flyers. He recorded the most points during the British Premier Division's 1989–90 season with the Cardiff Devils. Moria joined the British Ice Hockey Hall of Fame in 2016.
