= Mikko Niemi (ice hockey) =

Finnish ice hockey player

- Born: June 17, 1972 (age 53) Tampere, Finland
- Height: 5 ft 10 in (178 cm)
- Weight: 176 lb (80 kg; 12 st 8 lb)
- Position: Defence
- Shot: Left
- Played for: Ilves
- Playing career: 1992–2006

Mikko Niemi (born June 17, 1972 in Tampere, Finland) is a retired Finnish professional ice hockey player.

== Career ==
Niemi began his career at junior level icing for his local team Ilves Tampere at junior A SM-liiga standard, the highest level of junior ice hockey. In his first season, 1989/90 he featured in 34 games, and helped out the offence with six points. This pushed Ilves into the post-season, where Niemi played on three occasions and also managed his first post-season point. Niemi was a cornerstone of the junior team, playing more than 60 times throughout the 1990/91 and 1991/92 seasons, again making the post-season in 1992 where he scored his first playoff goal.

Niemi's chance at senior level came the following season, 1992/93. He alternated between the junior A standard and full SM-liiga level and played 8 times for the full Ilves team, a significant achievement for a twenty-year-old defenceman. Part way through the 1992/93 season however, Niemi made a temporary move to FPS who played at the lower Mestis standard in Niemi's homeland. The defenceman coped well with the change and scored 5 points in 23 games at senior level as well as 3 points in 7 junior contests.

At the start of the 1993/94 season, Niemi was an Ilves player and played on five occasions in the SM-liiga. He was sent out to lower division teams again however in order to develop him as a player, this time icing for Hermes Kokkola and KooVee, another team from the city of Tampere. Niemi found himself as a regular player for both teams.

His showings at the lower level again persuaded Ilves to recall Niemi to their first team squad for the 1994/95 season. He found only limited opportunities however, playing just five SM-liiga games and making six Liigakarsinta appearances. It was his last season as an Ilves player, as Niemi chose to move to Sweden and Örebro IK. Again he failed to establish himself as a key player, and made just eleven appearances before a mid-season switch to play for the Durham Wasps of the BHL. Niemi played 15 times for the Wasps before the end of the season. Despite a reasonably successful spell in the United Kingdom, Niemi moved to Germany and EV Landsberg. This sparked Niemi's point scoring ability, and in 53 games he scored 41 points, a remarkable total for a defenceman.

Niemi remained in Germany for the following season (1997–98), although moved to play for the EV Duisburg organisation. Here he was rather less successful, playing just 16 times and managing just one assist. Niemi failed to gain a contract for fully professional hockey the next year, and returned for the 1999/2000 season as a Herlev Hornets player. The Hornets ice in the highest level of Danish hockey, the Oddset Ligaen. Niemi combined his defensive duties with his offensive talent well for Herlev, scoring 22 points in 42 league games. This success saw Niemi signed by Rungsted IK, again of the Oddset Ligaen for the 2000/01 term. Niemi stayed just one season though before moving back to Herlev, where he again tasted success and helped the team into the post season.

Niemi returned to the United Kingdom for the 2003/04 season, and played in the newly formed EIHL for the London Racers in their debut season as an organisation. Niemi played 19 games for the Racers before moving mid-season to another team playing their first season, the Manchester Phoenix. The Phoenix organisation struggled financially however, and at the end of the season had to temporarily terminate playing operations.

This prompted Niemi to return to his native Finland and sign for HC Montreal of the Suomi-sarja, the third tier of Finnish ice hockey. Niemi played on ten occasions for Montreal, scoring one point. He remained in the Sarja for his final professional season, icing for LeKi Lempäälä on nine occasions before announcing his retirement from the game.

== Career statistics ==
| | | | Regular season | | | | | Playoffs | | | | |
| Season | Team | League | GP | G | A | Pts | PIM | GP | G | A | Pts | PIM |
|---|---|---|---|---|---|---|---|---|---|---|---|---|
| 1989-90 | Ilves Tampere | Jr. A SM-liiga | 34 | 2 | 4 | 6 | 24 | 3 | 0 | 1 | 1 | 0 |
| 1990-91 | Ilves Tampere | Jr. A SM-liiga | 36 | 3 | 5 | 8 | 20 | - | - | - | - | - |
| 1991-92 | Ilves Tampere | Jr. A SM-liiga | 30 | 3 | 4 | 7 | 12 | 7 | 1 | 1 | 2 | 4 |
| 1992-93 | Ilves Tampere | SM-liiga | 8 | 0 | 1 | 1 | 2 | - | - | - | - | - |
| 1992-93 | Ilves Tampere | Jr. A SM-liiga | 9 | 0 | 2 | 2 | 10 | 5 | 0 | 4 | 4 | 4 |
| 1992-93 | FPS | I Divisioona | 23 | 1 | 4 | 5 | 4 | - | - | - | - | - |
| 1992-93 | FPS | Jr. A SM-liiga | 7 | 1 | 2 | 3 | 6 | - | - | - | - | - |
| 1993-94 | Ilves Tampere | SM-liiga | 5 | 0 | 0 | 0 | 4 | - | - | - | - | - |
| 1993-94 | Hermes Kokkola | I Divisioona | 29 | 2 | 6 | 8 | 45 | - | - | - | - | - |
| 1993-94 | KooVee | II Divisioona | - | - | - | - | - | 2 | 1 | 0 | 1 | 0 |
| 1994-95 | KooVee | II Divisioona | 23 | 0 | 5 | 5 | 18 | - | - | - | - | - |
| 1994-95 | Ilves Tampere | SM-liiga | 5 | 0 | 1 | 1 | 4 | - | - | - | - | - |
| 1994-95 | Ilves Tampere | Liigakarsinta | 6 | 0 | 0 | 0 | 2 | - | - | - | - | - |
| 1995-96 | Örebro IK | Div.1 (SWE) | 11 | 2 | 1 | 3 | 10 | - | - | - | - | - |
| 1995-96 | Durham Wasps | BHL | 15 | 1 | 3 | 4 | 18 | - | - | - | - | - |
| 1996-97 | EV Landsberg | 1.Liga Süd | 53 | 17 | 24 | 41 | 71 | - | - | - | - | - |
| 1997-98 | EV Duisburg | 1.Liga Nord | 16 | 0 | 1 | 1 | 41 | - | - | - | - | - |
| 1999-00 | Herlev IC | Oddset Ligaen | 42 | 7 | 15 | 22 | 46 | - | - | - | - | - |
| 2000-01 | Rungsted IK | Oddset Ligaen | | | | | | | | | | |
| 2001-02 | Herlev IC | Oddset Ligaen | 35 | 1 | 6 | 7 | 75 | 6 | 1 | 1 | 2 | 6 |
| 2003-04 | London Racers | EIHL | 19 | 2 | 3 | 5 | 54 | - | - | - | - | - |
| 2003-04 | Manchester Phoenix | EIHL | 15 | 0 | 3 | 3 | 20 | - | - | - | - | - |
| 2004-05 | HC Montreal | Suomi-sarja | 10 | 1 | 0 | 1 | 12 | - | - | - | - | - |
| 2005-06 | LeKi Lempäälä | Suomi-sarja | 9 | 0 | 1 | 1 | 6 | - | - | - | - | - |
| Career totals | | | 425 | 42 | 88 | 130 | 486 | 23 | 3 | 7 | 10 | 14 |
