= Edinburgh Capitals (SNL) =

Edinburgh Capitals (SNL) aka The Caps
- City: Edinburgh, Scotland
- League: Scottish National League
- Founded: 1998
- Home arena: Murrayfield Ice Rink; Capacity: 3800; Ice size: 200 ft x 97 ft
- Colours: White, Blue and Red
- Owner(s): (Scotland) Scott Neil
- Head coach: (Scotland) Steven Lynch
- Captain: (Switzerland) Joel Gautschi

The Edinburgh Capitals (SNL) were an ice hockey team based in Edinburgh, Scotland. Formed in 1998, they were the 'B' team for the Elite League Capitals with whom they shared their name. The Edinburgh Capitals (SNL) played in the Scottish National League which is considered a third tier league in the United Kingdom equivalent to the equivalent to the NIHL. Certain players also ice for or have iced for their Elite League counterparts.

The Captain for the 2017–18 season was Joel Gautschi. His assistants were the two veterans, Ross Hay and Gary Hughes.

The team folded in 2018 when the Elite League Capitals did.

== Team roster ==
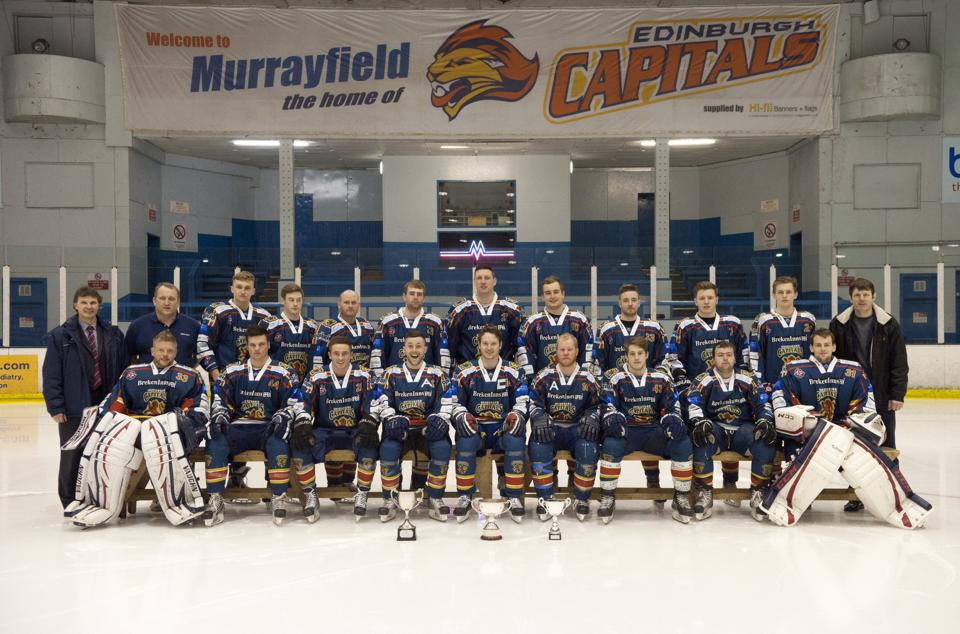
Edinburgh Capitals (SNL) 2013/14 Team Photo

Net Minders

- (Scotland) Craig Chalmers
- (Scotland) Ciaran Hoggan

Defense

- (Scotland) Josh Quinn
- (Scotland) Dean Walker
- (Scotland) Rhys Stenhouse
- (Scotland) Ben Coughtrie "A"
- (Scotland) Aiden Paterson
- (England) (Switzerland) Jack Wright
- (Scotland) Ross Dalgleish
- (Scotland) Scott Geddes
- (Scotland) Kian Shevlin

Forwards

- (Scotland) (Switzerland) Joel Gautschi "C"
- (Scotland) Ross Borwick "A"
- (Scotland) Tymo Szewczyk
- (Scotland) Andrew Craik
- (England) Ian Blake
- (Scotland) Sean Cochrane
- (Scotland) Archie Holmes
- (Scotland) Joe Lynch
- (Scotland) Aaron Robertson
- (Scotland) Cameron Gallagher
- (Scotland) Chad Smith "A"
- (Scotland) Ruairi Lockerbie
- (Australia) (Republic of Ireland) Xander Wardlaw
- (Russia) Andrei Ogloblin

== History ==
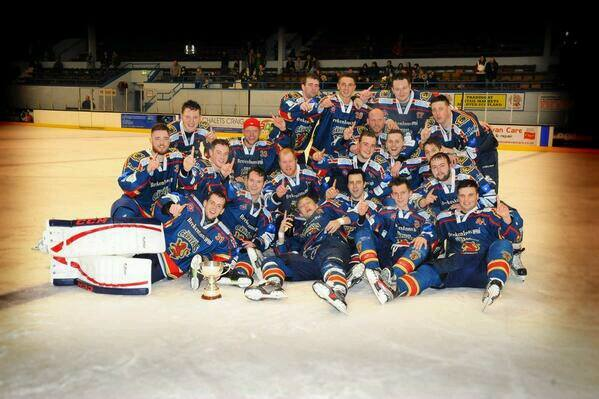
The Edinburgh Capitals (SNL) victory photo with the 2013–14 SNL league cup.

- 2001–02 SNL League Champions
- 2002–03 SNL League Champions
- 2012–13 SNL Scottish Cup Winners
- 2013–14 SNL League Champions
- 2013–14 SNL Playoff Champions
- 2013–14 SNL Scottish Cup Winners
- 2014–15 SNL Autumn Cup Winners
- 2014–15 SNL Scottish Cup Winners

== Team Season Stats ==
Season	Team	League	GP	W	T	L	GF	GA	TP	Rank	Postseason
2001–02	Edinburgh Capitals SNL	SNL	16	12	1	3	110	53	25	1st Champions	-
2002–03	Edinburgh Capitals SNL	SNL	16	13	1	2	104	30	27	1st Champions	-
2003–04	Edinburgh Capitals SNL	SNL	14	9	1	4	64	47	19	3rd	-
2004–05	Edinburgh Capitals SNL	SNL	14	9	1	4	70	39	19	3rd	-
2005–06	Edinburgh Capitals SNL	SNL	16	9	1	6	85	47	19	4th	-
2006–07	Edinburgh Capitals SNL	SNL	18	9	1	8	106	74	19	4th	-
2007–08	Edinburgh Capitals SNL	SNL	16	10	0	6	32	24	20	2nd	Semifinal Loss
2008–09	Edinburgh Capitals SNL	SNL	15	6	2	7	38	55	14	4th	-
2009–10	Edinburgh Capitals SNL	SNL	14	3	2	9	44	74	8	7th	-
2010–11	Edinburgh Capitals SNL	SNL	14	10	0	4	87	55	20	3rd	-
2011–12	Edinburgh Capitals SNL	SNL	16	5	4	7	75	63	14	4th	-
2012–13	Edinburgh Capitals SNL	SNL	17	8	1	8	67	73	19	4th	Semifinal loss
2013–14	Edinburgh Capitals SNL	SNL	18	13	3	2	114	41	31	1st Champions	Champions
2014–15	Edinburgh Capitals SNL	SNL	20	15	2	3	130	47	32	2nd	}
2015–16	Edinburgh Capitals SNL	SNL	18	10	3	5	101	66	23	3rd	}
2016–17	Edinburgh Capitals SNL	SNL	16	6	3	7	56	67	15	5th	-
