= Scottish Crown =

Scottish Crown may refer to:

- Crown (coin), see Scottish coinage
- Crown of Scotland, part of the Honours of Scotland, kept at Edinburgh Castle
- Scottish monarchy, see List of Scottish monarchs
- The Crown
