= Scottish language =

Scottish language may refer to:

- Scots language (Scots Leid), a Germanic language spoken in Lowland Scotland and Ulster, native to southeast Scotland
- Scottish Gaelic (Gàidhlig), a Celtic language native to the Scottish Highlands
- Scottish English, the varieties of English spoken in Scotland
- Scottish Language, a peer-reviewed journal of Scottish languages and linguistics, published by the Association for Scottish Literary Studies

== See also ==
- Languages of Scotland, the languages spoken or once spoken in Scotland
