= Mikko Niemi (basketball) =

Finnish basketball player (born 1985)

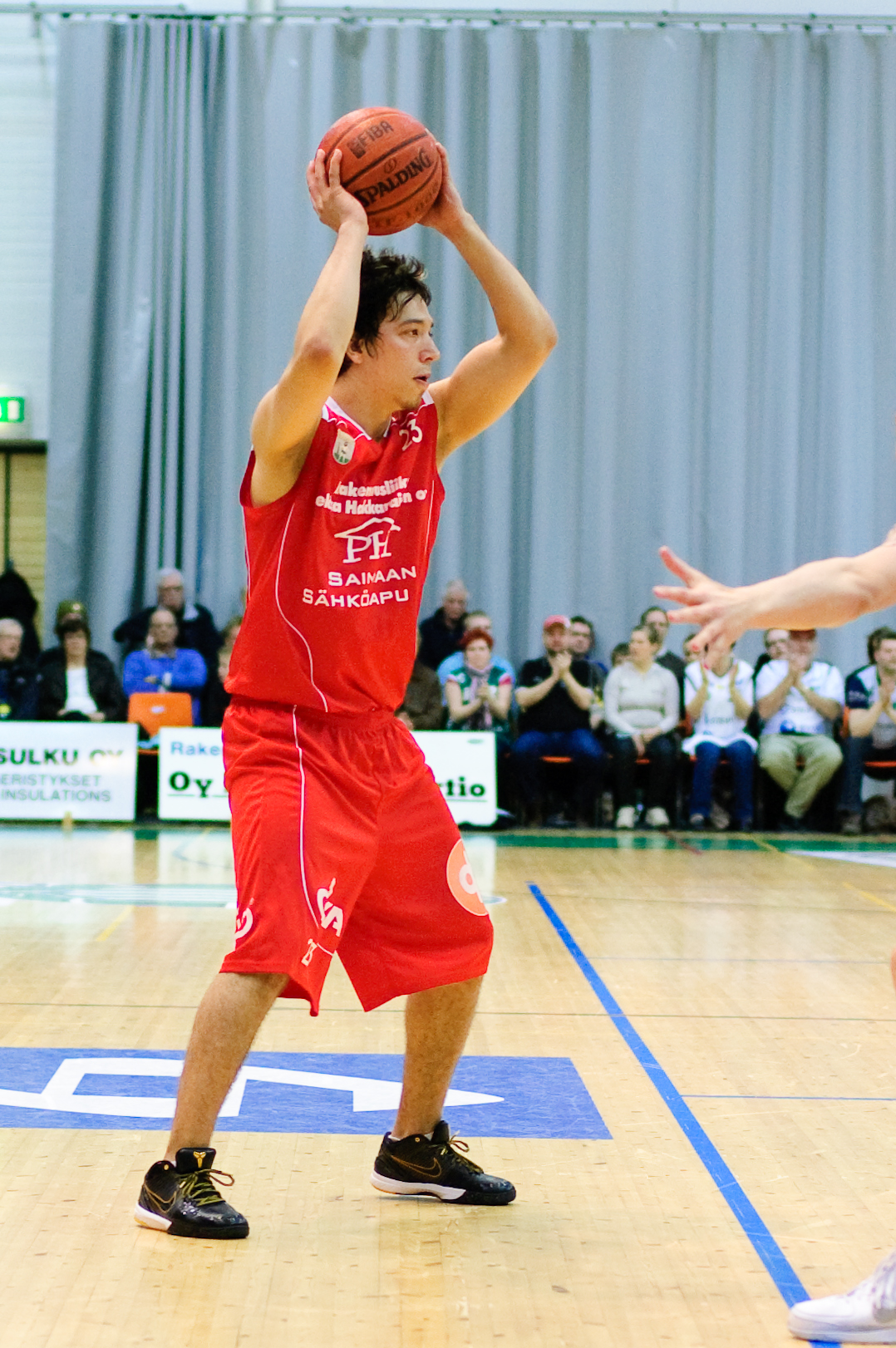
- Niemi in 2010.

Personal information
- Born: 12 May 1985 (age 41) Kangasala, Finland
- Listed height: 6 ft 1 in (1.85 m)
- Listed weight: 190 lb (86 kg)

Career information
- College: Youngstown State (2005–2009)
- Position: Point guard

Career history
- 2002–2005: Pyrbasket
- 2009–2010: Lappeenrannan NMKY

Mikko Otto Petteri Niemi (born 12 May 1985) is a Finnish retired basketball player. 185 cm tall point guard Niemi played in Korisliiga for his foster club Tampereen Pyrintö (Pyrbasket) for three seasons before departing to Youngstown State University, where he stayed between 2005 and 2009. After that he played for one more season in Korisliiga, this time in Lappeenrannan NMKY.

Niemi played two matches in Finland national basketball team in 2004, as well as 49 youth international games.

== Career ==
=== Early career ===
Niemi was born in the Finnish town of Kangasala. He began playing for Tampereen Pyrintö (Pyrbasket) in the 2002–03 season, with his first match on 14 October 2002, which resulted in a 95–88 win against Pussihukat. He started the game and played almost 30 minutes.

In February 2004 Pyrbasket tied the league record for three-pointers in a league game, with 21 in a 110–91 victory against Porvoon Tarmo. Niemi was among the three players contributing the most, succeeding with four shots from behind the line. In March 2005 Niemi was part of the Pyrintö team which won the national under-22 championship for the first time.

=== Youngstown State University ===
Niemi went to the United States and played college basketball for Youngstown State University from 2005. In his first season he averaged 1.0 points per game, which was among the lowest on the team. In his second season Niemi played 31 games and averaged 10.6 minutes of playing time but his scoring average fell to 0.8 points per game, as Youngstown reached the quarterfinals of the Horizon League tournament. In the 2007–08 season he continued to play for Youngstown State but his side were eliminated from the Horizon League in their first post-season match.

Across his four-year college basketball career, Niemi had 106 rebounds and the same number of assists. He also scored 82 points and made 22 steals.

=== Later career ===
In 2009 Niemi signed with Lappeenrannan NMKY to return to Finland's Korisliiga. He played a single season at the club.

== Sources ==
- "Mikko Niemi". Finnish Basketball Association. Archived from the original on 27 September 2015.
- "National Team Statistics". Finnish Basketball Association.
- "Mikko Otto Petteri Niemi". fiba.basketball. n.d.
