= Murrayfield Ice Rink =

Sports venue in City of Edinburgh, Scotland

- MIR
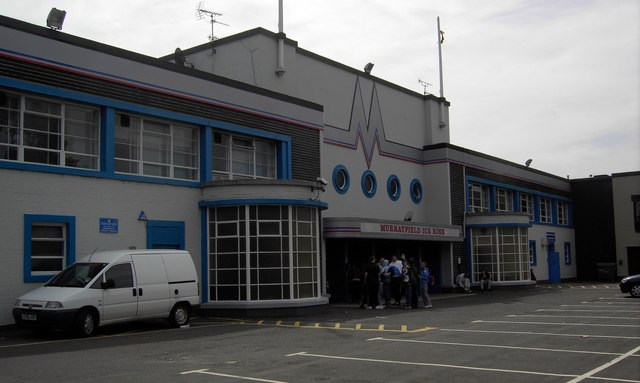
- Entrance to Murrayfield Ice Rink
- Interactive map of Murrayfield Ice Rink
- Location: Riversdale Crescent, Murrayfield, Edinburgh
- Coordinates: 55°56′35.95″N 3°14′37.88″W
- Owner: Murrayfield Ice Rink Ltd (Skating Rink); Murrayfield Curling Ltd (Curling Rink)
- Operator: Murrayfield Ice Arena
- Capacity: 3,800
- Surface: 200 ft × 97 ft (61 m × 30 m)

Construction
- Groundbreaking: 1938
- Built: 1939
- Opened: 1952
- Expanded: 1980 (Curling Rink)
- Architects: J. B. Dunn & Martin

Tenants
- Murrayfield Royals (1952–1958); Edinburgh Royals (1958–1966); Murrayfield Racers (1966–1994); Edinburgh Racers (1994–1995); Murrayfield Royals (1995–1996); Edinburgh Capitals (1998–2018); Murrayfield Racers (2018–2021); Edinburgh Capitals (2022–Present)

Website
- www.murrayfieldicearena.com//

Murrayfield Ice Rink is a 3,800-seat multi-purpose arena in Edinburgh, Scotland, adjacent to Murrayfield Stadium and situated between the Murrayfield, Roseburn and Saughtonhall neighbourhoods. It was built between 1938 and 1939 (but was not used for its intended purpose until the 1950s, having been used as a store during the Second World War) and is home to the Edinburgh Capitals ice hockey team and a seven-sheet curling rink which was constructed in the 1970s following the closure of Haymarket Ice Rink.

== History ==
The venue hosted the boxing events at the 1970 British Commonwealth Games.

In 2013 it was designated a Category B listed structure by Historic Environment Scotland due to being "an extremely rare surviving example of a purpose-built ice rink building... features a stylish 1930s Art Deco entrance façade". Since 2021, the Edinburgh Rugby Stadium has been situated immediately to the south.

== Ice Hockey ==
The Edinburgh Capitals are the main ice hockey team that are playing out of Murrayfield Ice Rink after it was announced they would be joining the Scottish National League from the 2022–23 season. The rink was formerly home to the Murrayfield Racers from their founding in 2018, until 2022.

== Sports and events usage ==
- Scottish National League (ice hockey)
- NIHL North Cup
- Murrayfield Ice Skaters Club (figure skating)
- Murrayfield Juniors Ice Hockey Club
- Women's National Ice Hockey League (Caledonia Steel Queens - three time British University Women's National Champions 2019, 2022, 2023)
- Edinburgh Eagles University Hockey
- Recreational Hockey (Edinburgh Knights, Edinburgh Lions, Edinburgh Phoenix, Edinburgh Stingers)
- Murrayfield Skating School
- Murrayfield Skating Academy
- Edinburgh Fringe Festival Venue
