= Scottish Civil War =

Scottish Civil War can refer to a number of internecine wars in Scottish history, including:

- War of the Scottish succession, 1094–1097
- The revolts of the Meic Uilleim in the late 12th Century and early 13th Century
- The revolts of the Macheths in the late 12th Century and early 13th Century
- Wars of Scottish Independence
- Marian civil war between Mary, Queen of Scots, and Regent Moray, 1568–1573
- Scotland in the Wars of the Three Kingdoms, 1639-1651
- The Jacobite risings, 1688–1746
