= Kilmarnock Storm =

- City: Kilmarnock
- League: SNL
- Founded: 2008
- Home arena: Galleon Centre
- Colors: Blue, White
- Head coach: Myles Watson, Eric Young
- Captain: Luke Kearsley

Championships
- Regular season titles: 2009
- Division titles: 1

Kilmarnock Storm are a Scottish ice hockey team that play in the Scottish National League. They play their games at Galleon Centre in Kilmarnock. They won the Scottish National League during the 2008–09 season.
