= Rick Fera =

English-Canadian ice hockey player

- Born: August 13, 1964 (age 60); Keswick, Ontario, Canada
- Height: 5 ft 8 in (173 cm)
- Weight: 160 lb (73 kg; 11 st 6 lb)
- Position: Forward
- Shot: Right
- Played for: Peterborough Petes; Sault Ste. Marie Greyhounds; Murrayfield Racers; Solihull Barons; Tayside Tigers; Fife Flyers; Trafford Metros; Basingstoke Bison; Paisley Pirates
- NHL draft: Undrafted
- Playing career: 1982–1999

Rick Fera (born August 13, 1964) is an English-Canadian former ice hockey forward.

== Playing career ==
Born in Keswick, Ontario, Canada, Fera spent the majority of his playing career playing in Great Britain, although he played junior ice hockey in his native Ontario. Fera also is a British citizen, which he achieved during his career. Although not well built, Fera was a speedy skater, who was extremely quick across the ice. Fera also played with high skill, was a deadly accurate shooter, and an extremely unselfish player, his points scoring record shows both these skills. His short partnership (#7 Jersey) with Great Britain Hall Of Famer & All-Star Player Tony Hand (#9 Jersey) at Murrayfield bore an uncanny ability to know where each other were on ice, giving rise to highly productive numbers together.

== Career stats ==
Team	League	Season	GP	Pts	PIMs
Peterborough Petes	OHL	82/83	7	2	0
Sault Ste. Marie Greyhounds	OHL	83/94	70	63	49
Sault Ste. Marie Greyhounds	OHL	84/85	1	1	0
Murrayfield Racers	BHL	85/86	35	196	91
Murrayfield Racers	BHL	86/87	42	297	95
Solihull Barons	BHL	87/88	42	164	75
Tayside Tigers	BHL	88/89	31	136	68
Fife Flyers	BHL	89/90	32	153	53
Fife Flyers	BHL	90/91	28	89	74
Trafford Metros	English League	91/92	35	174	50
Basingstoke Bison	BHL	92/93	32	180	30
Trafford Metros	BHL	93/94	42	229	155
Missed 95/96 season through injuries
Paisley Pirates	BHL	96/97	18	62	12
Basingstoke Bison	BHL	97/98	27	37	38
Great Britain	Ice Hockey World Championships	93/94	13	22	22
Career	N/A	82/98	470	1947	847

== Awards ==
- 1986/87 British Hockey League Champion with Murrayfield Racers
- 1986/87 British Hockey League Most Goals with Murrayfield Racers
- 1986/87 British Hockey League Most Points with Murrayfield Racers
- 1986/87 British Hockey League Best Player with Murrayfield Racers
- 1986/87 British Hockey League All star Team.
