= Scottish Cup (ice hockey) =

National ice hockey cup in Scotland

The Scottish Cup is the national ice hockey cup in Scotland. It has been held since 1997.

== Champions ==
=== Scottish Cup ===
- 1997 : Paisley Pirates
- 1998 : Fife Flyers
- 1999 : Fife Flyers
- 2000 : Fife Flyers
- 2001 : Fife Flyers
- 2002 : Edinburgh Capitals 2
- 2003 : Camperdown
- 2004 : Dumfries
- 2005 : Paisley Pirates
- 2006 : Fife Flyers
- 2007 : Fife Flyers
- 2008 : Dundee Rockets
- 2009 : Fife Flyers
- 2010 : Fife Flyers

=== Scottish Autumn Cup ===
- 2001 : Edinburgh Capitals 2
- 2002 : Edinburgh Capitals 2
- 2003 : Paisley Pirates
- 2004 : Camperdown
- 2005 : Solway Sharks
- 2006 : Fife Flyers
- 2007 : Fife Flyers
- 2008 : Dundee Stars
- 2009 : Fife Flyers
- 2010 : Dundee Stars

=== Scottish Spring Cup ===
- 2001 : Edinburgh Capitals
- 2002 : Edinburgh Capitals 2
- 2003 : Edinburgh Capitals 2
- 2004 : Dumfries
- 2005 : Edinburgh Capitals 2
- 2006 : Solway Sharks
