= North Ayrshire Wild =

- City: Stevenston, Scotland
- League: SNL
- Home arena: Auchenharvie Ice Rink
- Colors: Black, orange, white
- Head coach: Domenico De Simone
- Website: northayrshireicehockeyclub.co.uk

The North Ayrshire Wild is a professional ice hockey team in the Scottish National League (SNL). The team plays in Stevenston, North Ayrshire, Scotland at Auchenharvie Ice Rink.

They are the men's representative team of North Ayrshire Ice Hockey Club (NAIHC). The NAIHC has a number of minor and junior ice hockey teams, all of which are also called the North Ayrshire Wild.
