= Castlereagh Knights =

UK ice hockey team

The Castlereagh Knights were an ice hockey team that played in the British National League during the 1996–97 season. The team played at the Dundonald Ice Bowl in Belfast, Northern Ireland.
