= Dundee Comets =

- City: Dundee, Scotland
- League: Scottish National League
- Founded: 2008
- Dissolved: 2024
- Home arena: Dundee Ice Arena
- Colours: Red, white, dark blue
- Head coach: Richard Hartmann

Championships
- Scottish National League: 2010–11, 2011–12
- Spring Cup Champions: 2010–11, 2011–12

The Dundee Comets were a Scottish ice hockey team, based in the city of Dundee, coached by John Dolan, former Dundee Stars Legend. They played at the Dundee Ice Arena, along with the Dundee Stars Elite Team and the Dundee Tigers SNL team.

The Comets play in the Scottish National League, and are current 2011–12 SNL Champions, 2011–12 Scottish Cup Champions and 2012 Spring Cup Champions. They also won all these titles in 2010–11. In 2024 they merged with the Dundee Tigers to reform the Dundee Rockets.

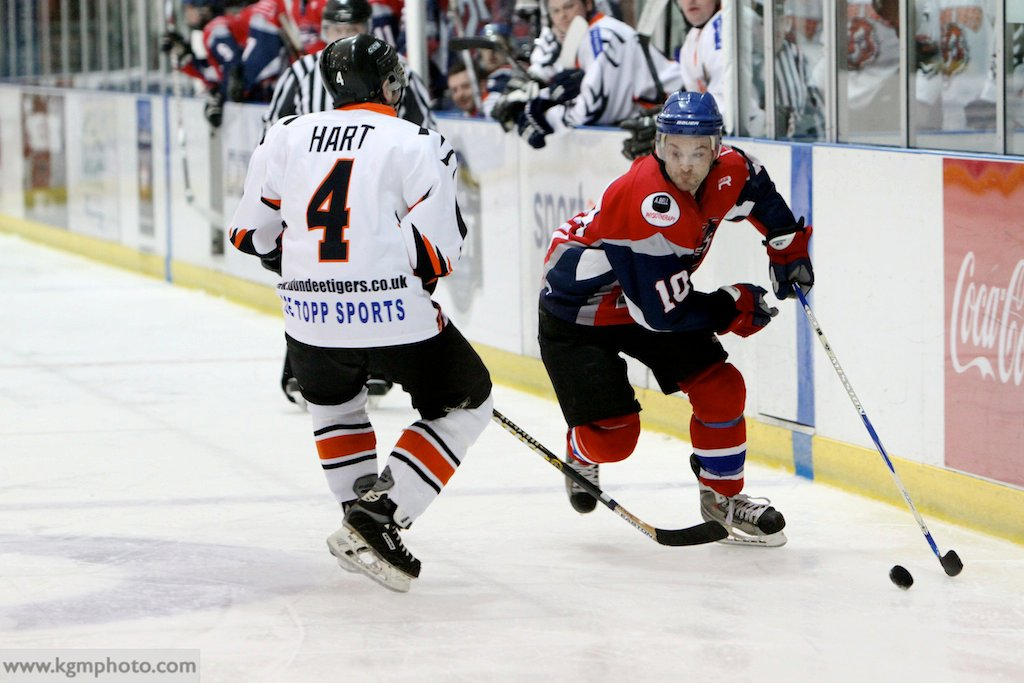
Comets v Tigers at Dundee ice Arena

== Club roster 2020–21 ==
Netminders
No.	Nat.	Player	Catches	Date of birth	Place of birth	Acquired	Contract

Defencemen
No.	Nat.	Player	Shoots	Date of birth	Place of birth	Acquired	Contract

Forwards
No.	Nat.	Player	Shoots	Date of birth	Place of birth	Acquired	Contract

== 2020/21 Outgoing ==
Outgoing
No.	Nat.	Player	Shoots	Date of birth	Place of birth	Leaving For
