= Kilmarnock Thunder =

Scottish ice hockey team

- City: Kilmarnock, Scotland
- League: Scottish National League
- Founded: 2017
- Home arena: Galleon Leisure Centre
- Colors
- Head coach: Andy Anderson
- Affiliates: Kilmarnock Junior Ice Hockey Team (present) Solway Sharks, NIHL (present)

The Kilmarnock Thunder are an ice hockey team based in Kilmarnock, Scotland. They currently play in the Scottish National League. They have a junior hockey affiliate named the Kilmarnock Junior Ice Hockey Team and are affiliated to the now professional ice hockey team Solway Sharks.

== Season-by-season record ==
| Season | League | GP | W | T | L | OTW | OTL | Pts. | Rank | Postseason |
|---|---|---|---|---|---|---|---|---|---|---|
| 2017–2018 | SNL | 18 | 2 | 0 | 16 | - | - | 4 | 10th | Did not make playoffs |
| 2018-2019 | SNL | 16 | 1 | 0 | 15 | - | - | 2 | 9th | Did not make playoffs |
| 2019-2020 | SNL | 17 | 0 | 0 | 17 | - | - | 0 | 10th | Did not make playoffs |

== Club roster 2020–21 ==
Netminders
| No. | Nat. | Player | Catches | Date of birth | Place of birth | Acquired | Contract |

Defencemen
| No. | Nat. | Player | Shoots | Date of birth | Place of birth | Acquired | Contract |

Forwards
| No. | Nat. | Player | Shoots | Date of birth | Place of birth | Acquired | Contract |

== 2020/21 Outgoing ==
Outgoing
| No. | Nat. | Player | Shoots | Date of birth | Place of birth | Leaving For |
