= Northern League (ice hockey, 2005) =

Ice hockey league

The Northern League was an ice hockey league in the United Kingdom, contested by teams from England, Wales, and Scotland. Named for the Northern League which existed in the 1960s and 1970s, it was founded in 2005 in the same format as the defunct Border League. The English and Welsh teams also play in the English National Hockey League.

This iteration of the Northern League folded after the 2010–2011 season. A smaller league with English and Scottish teams adopted the name in 2022. Several teams formerly in the league joined the Elite Ice Hockey League.

== Former teams ==
- (Scotland) Fife Flyers
- (Scotland) Solway Sharks
- (Scotland) Dundee Stars
- (England) Whitley Warriors
- (England) Sheffield Spartans
- (England) Blackburn Hawks
- (England) TDC Northern Stars
- (Wales) Flintshire Freeze
- (England) Bradford Bulldogs
