= London Racers =

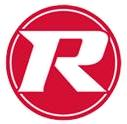
- City: London, United Kingdom
- League: Elite Ice Hockey League
- Founded: 2003
- Operated: 2003-2006
- Home arena: Lee Valley Ice Centre
- Colours: Red and White
- Owners: Roger Black, Tom Wills, Pavel Pojdl
- General manager: Scott Johnston
- Head coach: N/A

Franchise history
- London Racers

The London Racers was a British ice hockey club based in London, England formerly members of the Elite Ice Hockey League. Although founded in 2003, it claimed to be a successor of the Harringay Racers club established in 1936. Due to a lack of suitable ice facility the club suspended its team operations part way through the 2005–06 season. It was the last professional ice hockey club to play in London.

== 2003–04 season ==
Formed and organized in only a few weeks, the Racers played their home games at Alexandra Palace. Erik Zachrisson captained the team. Their first season was a difficult one, as the team failed to win for some 40 games. Finally, a win arrived with a 3–0 victory over the Cardiff Devils. Another win followed as the team beat the Basingstoke Bison 4–0, but the team finished with a ghastly 3–49–2–2 record, still (as of 2010) the worst in league history.

== 2004–05 season ==
The team moved to the 1,200 capacity Lee Valley Ice Centre in Leyton, east London, although the arena was considered small for Elite League hockey. The offseason saw the hiring of former American Hockey League player Dennis Maxwell as Coach, who assembled a much stronger team, including perennial British all-star Steve Moria, and, with the 2004–05 NHL lockout, defenceman Eric Cairns and centre Scott Nichol from the National Hockey League. They made the playoffs in the sixth slot (out of seven teams) with a 19–19–9–3 record, but were eliminated by the Cardiff Devils.

== 2005–06 season ==
On 5 November, during a game against the Nottingham Panthers, defenseman Blaž Emeršič sustained serious facial injuries after colliding with a protruding object in the rink boardings. Days later on 13 November a piece of plexiglass was smashed. When the same section of glass smashed again at a training session the following Tuesday, serious questions regarding the safety of players and spectators were raised. Unable to find a new venue or secure agreement on improving safety at Lee Valley, the Racers withdrew their team from competitions on 21 November and subsequently folded.
