= Aberdeen Lynx =

- City: Aberdeen, Scotland
- League: SNL
- Founded: 2005
- Home arena: Linx Ice Arena
- Colours: Red white, black
- Head coach: Jordan Leyden
- Captain: Ben Edmonds
- Website: www.aberdeenlynx.com

Championships
- Regular season titles: 2022–23 2023-24
- Playoff championships: 2015–16 2024-25

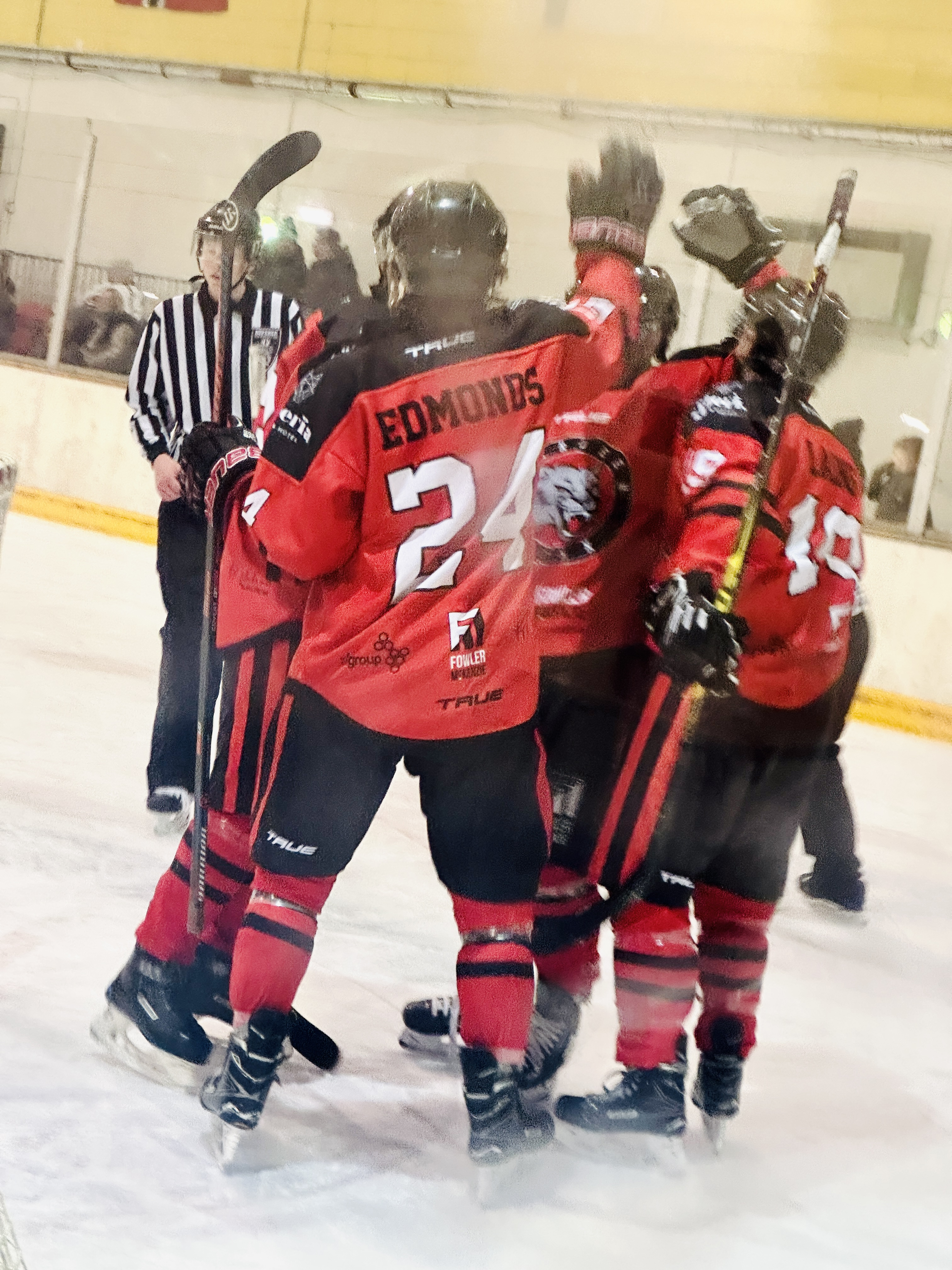

The Aberdeen Lynx are a Scottish ice hockey team who play in the Scottish National League (SNL).

== Aberdeen Lynx Ice Hockey Club ==
Aberdeen Lynx Ice Hockey Club is a registered charity in Scotland. Focusing on junior development from learns to play all the way up to under 19s and seniors (SNL).

== SNL team ==
The team have the highest average attendance in the SNL, with home games regularly selling out.
