= Dumfries Vikings =

Ice hockey team

The Dumfries Vikings are a defunct professional ice hockey team based in Dumfries, Scotland, which played in the British Hockey League from 1993 to 1996 (playing their final season as the Dumfries Border Vikings).
