= Medway Bears =

Ice hockey team in Kent, England

The Medway Bears were a professional British ice hockey team based in Gillingham, England. They played in the British Hockey League's Division One from 1986 to 1991, the English League Division One in 1991–92, the British Hockey League Division One again from 1992 to 1996, and finally the British National League in 1996–97.
