= Scottish National League (ice hockey) =

Ice hockey league in the UK

- Sport: Ice hockey
- Founded: 1998
- No. of teams: 9
- Country: Scotland
- Headquarters: Edinburgh, Scotland,
- Continent: Europe
- Most recent champion: Edinburgh Capitals (2025–26)
- Level on pyramid: 2
- Website: siha-uk.co.uk

The Scottish National League is a professional ice hockey league based in Scotland comprising nine teams for the 2025/26 season.

The league sits below the Elite Ice Hockey League (EIHL) in the UK ice hockey structure alongside England's National Ice Hockey League (NIHL).

== History ==
Following the demise of the British National League at the end of the 2004–05 season, the Fife Flyers and Dundee Stars transferred to the SNL, significantly raising the league's profile.

Both teams have however since left the SNL and now compete in the highest tier of United Kingdom Ice Hockey, the Elite Ice Hockey League (EIHL). Due to their transfer to the EIHL, both Dundee and Fife were then represented in the SNL by both Dundee Comets and Kirkcaldy Kestrels respectfully.

In the summer of 2024, a joint statement by both Dundee Comets and fellow Tayside SNL side Dundee Tigers announced the merging of the two clubs to reform the Dundee Rockets. The Rockets would go on to secure a league and cup double in their first season on reforming in 2024/25.

From the 2025/26 season, the league will also welcome the new additions of an SNL side representing NIHL club Solway Sharks as well as NIHL1 side Whitley Warriors from the North East of England.

== Clubs ==
=== 2025–26 SNL Teams ===
	Club	Founded	City	Arena(s)	Capacity
(Scotland)	Aberdeen Lynx	2005	Aberdeen	Linx Ice Arena	1,118
(Scotland)	Dundee Rockets	2024	Dundee	Dundee Ice Arena	2,700
(Scotland)	Edinburgh Capitals	2022	Edinburgh	Murrayfield Ice Rink	3,800
(Scotland)	Kilmarnock Thunder	2017	Kilmarnock	Galleon Leisure Centre	400
(Scotland)	Kirkcaldy Kestrels	1984	Kirkcaldy	Fife Ice Arena	3,525
(Scotland)	North Ayrshire Wild	2002	Stevenston	Auchenharvie Leisure Centre	250
(Scotland)	Paisley Pirates	1946	Glasgow	Braehead Arena	4,000
(Scotland)	Solway Sharks SNL	2025	Dumfries	Dumfries Ice Bowl	1,000
(England)	Whitley Warriors	1957	Whitley Bay	Whitley Bay Ice Rink	3,200

== Championships ==
Season	Winner	Runner-up	Third	Play-off winner	Finalist
1998–1999	Solway Sharks	Glasgow Dynamos	Perth Panthers		
1999–2000	Solway Sharks	Ayr Centrum Bruins	Murrayfield Raiders		
2000–2001	Dundee Tigers	Solway Sharks	Murrayfield Raiders		
2001–2002	Edinburgh Capitals SNL	Dundee Tigers	Kilmarnock Storm		
2002–2003	Edinburgh Capitals SNL	Camperdown Stars	Kirkcaldy Kestrels		
2003–2004	Camperdown Stars	Paisley Pirates	Edinburgh Capitals SNL		
2004–2005	Camperdown Stars	Solway Sharks	Edinburgh Capitals SNL		
2005–2006	Fife Flyers	Dundee Stars	Paisley Pirates	Fife Flyers	Dundee Stars
2006–2007	Fife Flyers	Dundee Stars	Solway Sharks	Fife Flyers	Solway Sharks
2007–2008 (Note: The top Scottish division was briefly replaced with the Scottish Premier League for this season.)	Scottish Warriors	Dundee Tigers	Aberdeen Lynx		
2008–2009	Kilmarnock Storm	Dundee Comets	Dundee Tigers		
2009–2010	Kirkcaldy Kestrels	Dundee Comets	Kilmarnock Storm		
2010–2011	Dundee Comets	Paisley Pirates	Edinburgh Capitals SNL		
2011–2012	Dundee Comets	Paisley Pirates	North Ayrshire Wild		
2012–2013	Paisley Pirates	Dundee Tigers	North Ayrshire Wild	Dundee Tigers	Paisley Pirates
2013–2014	Edinburgh Capitals SNL	Kirkcaldy Kestrels	North Ayrshire Wild	Edinburgh Capitals SNL	North Ayrshire Wild
2014–2015	Kirkcaldy Kestrels	Edinburgh Capitals SNL	Paisley Pirates	Kirkcaldy Kestrels	Edinburgh Capitals SNL
2015–2016	Kirkcaldy Kestrels	Paisley Pirates	Edinburgh Capitals SNL	Aberdeen Lynx	Dundee Comets
2016–2017	Paisley Pirates	Aberdeen Lynx	Dundee Comets	Dundee Comets	Paisley Pirates
2017–2018	Dundee Comets	Paisley Pirates	Kirkcaldy Kestrels	Dundee Comets	Kirkcaldy Kestrels
2018–2019	Murrayfield Racers	Paisley Pirates	Kirkcaldy Kestrels	Paisley Pirates	Murrayfield Racers
2021-2022	Kirkcaldy Kestrels	Aberdeen Lynx	Dundee Comets	Dundee Comets	Kirkcaldy Kestrels
2022-2023	Aberdeen Lynx	Edinburgh Capitals	Dundee Comets	Dundee Comets	Aberdeen Lynx
2023-2024	Aberdeen Lynx	Edinburgh Capitals	Kilmarnock Thunder	Edinburgh Capitals	Kirkcaldy Kestrels
2024-2025	Dundee Rockets	Edinburgh Capitals	Aberdeen Lynx	Aberdeen Lynx	Kirkcaldy Kestrels
2025-2026	Edinburgh Capitals	Dundee Rockets	Whitley Warriors	Dundee Rockets	Edinburgh Capitals
