= Mark Morrison (ice hockey, born 1963) =

Canadian ice hockey player

- Born: March 11, 1963 (age 63) Delta, British Columbia, Canada
- Height: 5 ft 9 in (175 cm)
- Weight: 160 lb (73 kg; 11 st 6 lb)
- Position: Centre
- Shot: Right
- Played for: Fife Flyers; HC Devils Milano; New York Rangers
- National team: Canada
- NHL draft: 51st overall, 1981; New York Rangers
- Playing career: 1981–2005

Mark Morrison (born March 11, 1963) is a Canadian former professional ice hockey player who played 10 games in the National Hockey League (NHL) with the New York Rangers. Morrison is currently the head coach of the Manitoba Moose of the American Hockey League (AHL). Mark is the brother of Doug Morrison who also played in the NHL. Their sister married fellow Canadian hockey player Garth Butcher.

== Playing career ==
Morrison was a member of the Tulsa Oilers Central Hockey League (CHL) team that suspended operations on February 16, 1984, playing only road games for the final six weeks of the 1983-84 season. Despite this adversity, the team went on to win the league's championship.

In 1993, Morrison moved to Scotland to play with the Fife Flyers of the British Hockey League (BHL). He took over as Flyers coach midway through the 1995-96 season, winning various Player and Coach of the Year awards over the next 10 years.

== Coaching ==
Morrison joined the Victoria Salmon Kings of the ECHL as an assistant coach in 2006, where he was eventually named the replacement for Tony MacAulay midway into the 2006-07 ECHL season. He assumed the titles of head coach and general manager at the start of the 2007-08 season and continued to hold that title until the Salmon Kings officially folded on May 7, 2011, when Morrison was effectively relieved of his duties and all of his players were considered to be unrestricted free agents.

On July 20, 2011, Morrison was announced as the assistant coach of the future St. John's IceCaps of the American Hockey League (AHL), the AHL affiliate of the Winnipeg Jets. He continued serving as an assistant coach when the franchise relocated back to Winnipeg as the Manitoba Moose in 2015.

Morrison was named an assistant coach with the Anaheim Ducks of the NHL on June 28, 2017.

After four seasons in Anaheim, he was re-hired by the Jets to be the head coach of the Manitoba Moose prior to the 2021–22 season.

== Career statistics ==
			Regular season					Playoffs
Season	Team	League	GP	G	A	Pts	PIM	GP	G	A	Pts	PIM
1979–80	Victoria Cougars	WHL	72	25	33	58	26	16	3	5	8	20
1980–81	Victoria Cougars	WHL	58	31	61	92	66	15	6	13	19	9
1981–82	Victoria Cougars	WHL	56	48	66	114	83	4	0	0	0	12
1981–82	New York Rangers	NHL	9	1	1	2	0	—	—	—	—	—
1982–83	Victoria Cougars	WHL	58	55	75	130	54	12	10	17	27	8
1983–84	Tulsa Oilers	CHL	11	4	4	8	2	—	—	—	—	—
1983–84	New York Rangers	NHL	1	0	0	0	0	—	—	—	—	—
1984–85	New Haven Nighthawks	AHL	20	5	4	9	0	—	—	—	—	—
1984–85	Nova Scotia Oilers	AHL	11	0	1	1	4	—	—	—	—	—
1985–86	HC Merano	Italy	36	59	88	147	30	—	—	—	—	—
1986–87	HC Fribourg-Gottéron	NLA	23	18	19	37	32	—	—	—	—	—
1987–88	EHC Olten	NLB	24	15	9	24	20	—	—	—	—	—
1988–89	HC Merano	Italy	41	38	76	114	25	—	—	—	—	—
1989–90	HC Milano Saima	Italy	36	39	42	81	30	—	—	—	—	—
1990–91	HC Milano Saima	Italy	33	29	41	70	18	—	—	—	—	—
1991–92	HC Merano	Italy2	26	44	44	88	45	—	—	—	—	—
1992–93	HC Merano	Italy2	32	58	34	92	38	—	—	—	—	—
1993–94	Fife Flyers	BHL	44	78	77	155	73	7	11	9	20	4
1994–95	Fife Flyers	BHL	36	52	63	115	24	2	2	4	6	2
1995–96	Fife Flyers	BHL	31	34	36	70	64	1	1	0	1	2
1996–97	Fife Flyers	NPIHL	35	68	58	126	60	12	11	22	33	22
1997–98	Fife Flyers	BNL	40	49	54	103	74	9	7	11	18	2
1998–99	Fife Flyers	BNL	22	13	17	30	24	—	—	—	—	—
1999–00	Fife Flyers	BNL	33	14	26	40	18	11	5	5	10	18
2000–01	Fife Flyers	BNL	34	14	28	42	24	6	4	5	9	2
2001–02	Fife Flyers	BNL	42	23	24	47	32	8	2	2	4	6
2002–03	Fife Flyers	BNL	34	6	15	21	61	6	2	3	5	6
2003–04	Fife Flyers	BNL	34	13	19	32	30	12	5	3	8	10
2004–05	Fife Flyers	BNL	33	13	15	28	30	11	2	5	7	14
NHL totals			10	1	1	2	0	—	—	—	—	—
AHL totals			31	5	5	10	4	—	—	—	—	—
BNL totals			272	145	198	343	293	63	27	34	61	58

== Awards ==
=== Player ===
- 1980-81: George Parsons Trophy (Sportsmanship), Memorial Cup (Canadian Hockey League)
- 1983-84: Adams Cup winner, Tulsa Oilers, (Central Hockey League)

=== Coach ===
- 1996-97: Coach Of The Year, Northern Premier League, Fife Flyers
- 1999-00: Coach Of The Year, British National League, Fife Flyers
- 2003-04: Coach Of The Year, British National League, Fife Flyers
