= Ron Shudra =

Canadian ice hockey player

- Born: November 28, 1967 (age 58) Winnipeg, Manitoba, Canada
- Height: 6 ft 2 in (188 cm)
- Weight: 192 lb (87 kg; 13 st 10 lb)
- Position: Defence
- Shot: Left
- Played for: Edmonton Oilers; Solihull Barons; Sheffield Steelers; Coventry Blaze
- NHL draft: 63rd overall, 1986; Edmonton Oilers
- Playing career: 1987–2009

Ronald James Shudra (born November 28, 1967) is a Canadian-British retired professional ice hockey player. Most of his career, which lasted from 1987 to 2009, was spent in the United Kingdom, though he also played 10 games in the National Hockey League with the Edmonton Oilers during the 1987–88 season. In 2010, he was inducted into the British Ice Hockey Hall of Fame.

== Playing career ==
He was drafted 63rd overall by the Edmonton Oilers in the 1986 NHL entry draft and played ten games for them in 1987–88 season. He spent the rest of his career in the United Kingdom, retiring in 2009.

== Coaching career ==
Shudra was the player / coach for the Sheffield Scimitars in the English Premier Ice Hockey League and named as junior coach (U-12) of the team on 3 May 2009.

== Personal life ==
Shudra has three children: daughter Dana and two sons, Cole and Tate, both of whom are hockey players in the English leagues.

== Career statistics ==
=== Regular season and playoffs ===
| | | | Regular season | | | | | Playoffs |
| Season | Team | League | GP | G | A | Pts | PIM | GP | G | A | Pts | PIM |
|---|---|---|---|---|---|---|---|---|---|---|---|---|
| 1984–85 | Red Deer Rustlers | AJHL | 57 | 14 | 57 | 71 | 70 | — | — | — | — | — |
| 1985–86 | Kamloops Blazers | WHL | 72 | 10 | 40 | 50 | 81 | 16 | 1 | 11 | 12 | 11 |
| 1985–86 | Kamloops Blazers | M-Cup | — | — | — | — | — | 5 | 1 | 1 | 2 | 0 |
| 1986–87 | Kamloops Blazers | WHL | 71 | 49 | 70 | 119 | 68 | 11 | 7 | 3 | 10 | 10 |
| 1987–88 | Edmonton Oilers | NHL | 10 | 0 | 5 | 5 | 6 | — | — | — | — | — |
| 1987–88 | Nova Scotia Oilers | AHL | 49 | 7 | 15 | 22 | 21 | — | — | — | — | — |
| 1988–89 | Cape Breton Oilers | AHL | 5 | 0 | 0 | 0 | 0 | — | — | — | — | — |
| 1988–89 | Denver Rangers | IHL | 64 | 11 | 14 | 25 | 44 | 2 | 0 | 0 | 0 | 0 |
| 1989–90 | Fort Wayne Komets | IHL | 67 | 11 | 16 | 27 | 48 | 2 | 0 | 0 | 0 | 0 |
| 1990–91 | Solihull Barons | BHL | 36 | 24 | 53 | 77 | 70 | 6 | 7 | 9 | 16 | 10 |
| 1991–92 | Sheffield Steelers | BD2 | 32 | 78 | 70 | 148 | 42 | — | — | — | — | — |
| 1992–93 | Sheffield Steelers | BD1 | 26 | 32 | 46 | 78 | 36 | — | — | — | — | — |
| 1993–94 | Sheffield Steelers | BHL | 34 | 31 | 48 | 79 | 69 | 8 | 8 | 16 | 24 | 6 |
| 1994–95 | Sheffield Steelers | BHL | 43 | 25 | 38 | 63 | 83 | 8 | 5 | 8 | 13 | 2 |
| 1995–96 | Sheffield Steelers | BHL | 36 | 23 | 31 | 54 | 56 | 8 | 2 | 4 | 6 | 2 |
| 1996–97 | Sheffield Steelers | BISL | 41 | 13 | 16 | 29 | 12 | 8 | 3 | 1 | 4 | 4 |
| 1997–98 | Sheffield Steelers | BISL | 38 | 8 | 16 | 24 | 18 | 9 | 1 | 2 | 3 | 0 |
| 1998–99 | Sheffield Steelers | BISL | 11 | 0 | 1 | 1 | 2 | 6 | 2 | 1 | 3 | 2 |
| 1999–00 | Hull Thunder | BNL | 35 | 18 | 32 | 50 | 26 | 6 | 2 | 6 | 8 | 2 |
| 2000–01 | Hull Thunder | BNL | 35 | 22 | 26 | 48 | 42 | 6 | 2 | 2 | 4 | 2 |
| 2001–02 | Edinburgh Capitals | BNL | 7 | 3 | 1 | 4 | 2 | — | — | — | — | — |
| 2001–02 | Sheffield Steelers | BISL | 25 | 4 | 6 | 10 | 10 | 8 | 1 | 0 | 1 | 0 |
| 2002–03 | Coventry Blaze | BNL | 36 | 10 | 22 | 32 | 20 | 10 | 1 | 3 | 4 | 4 |
| 2003–04 | Sheffield Steelers | EIHL | 50 | 8 | 33 | 41 | 24 | 6 | 0 | 1 | 1 | 0 |
| 2004–05 | Sheffield Steelers | EIHL | 30 | 2 | 9 | 11 | 4 | 10 | 1 | 2 | 3 | 0 |
| 2005–06 | Sheffield Steelers | EIHL | 44 | 7 | 19 | 26 | 38 | 8 | 1 | 7 | 8 | 6 |
| 2006–07 | Sheffield Scimitars | EPIHL | 44 | 14 | 41 | 55 | 18 | 6 | 0 | 3 | 3 | 8 |
| 2007–08 | Sheffield Scimitars | EPIHL | 39 | 7 | 14 | 21 | 22 | 7 | 2 | 2 | 4 | 14 |
| 2008–09 | Sheffield Scimitars | EPIHL | 52 | 14 | 25 | 39 | 8 | — | — | — | — | — |
| NHL totals | | | 10 | 0 | 5 | 5 | 6 | — | — | — | — | — |
| BHL/BISL/EIHL totals | | | 388 | 145 | 270 | 415 | 386 | 85 | 31 | 51 | 82 | 32 |

== Awards ==
- WHL West Second All-Star Team – 1986 & 1987
- Inducted to the British Ice Hockey Hall of Fame in 2010.
