= Steve Brown (ice hockey) =

Canadian ice hockey and roller hockey player

- Born: March 31, 1965 (age 61) Winnipeg, Manitoba, Canada
- Height: 5 ft 9 in (175 cm)
- Weight: 176 lb (80 kg; 12 st 8 lb)
- Position: Defence
- Shot: Left
- Played for: BHL; Blackpool Seagulls; Whitley Warriors; Newcastle Warriors; BISL; Basingstoke Bison; EIHL; Fife Flyers; Hull Thunder
- NHL draft: Undrafted
- Playing career: 1990–2000

Steve Brown (born March 31, 1965) is a Canadian former professional ice hockey and inline hockey player.

Brown played professional roller hockey with the Vancouver Voodoo of Roller Hockey International during the 1995 season.

== Career statistics ==
| | | | Regular season | | | | | Playoffs |
| Season | Team | League | GP | G | A | Pts | PIM | GP | G | A | Pts | PIM |
|---|---|---|---|---|---|---|---|---|---|---|---|---|
| 1982–83 | Fort Garry Blues | MJHL | — | — | — | — | — | — | — | — | — | — |
| 1983–84 | Fort Garry Blues | MJHL | — | — | — | — | — | — | — | — | — | — |
| 1984–85 | Winnipeg South Blues | MJHL | — | 18 | 64 | 82 | — | — | — | — | — | — |
| 1985–86 | University of Manitoba | CIAU | 28 | 7 | 19 | 26 | 34 | — | — | — | — | — |
| 1987–88 | University of Manitoba | CIAU | 27 | 13 | 35 | 48 | 74 | — | — | — | — | — |
| 1990–91 | Grefrather EC | Germany2 | 31 | 13 | 35 | 48 | 66 | — | — | — | — | — |
| 1991–92 | Grefrather EC | Germany2 | — | — | — | — | — | — | — | — | — | — |
| 1993–94 | Whitley Warriors | BHL | 44 | 52 | 52 | 104 | 28 | 6 | 5 | 8 | 13 | 22 |
| 1994–95 | Whitley Warriors | BHL | 44 | 57 | 56 | 113 | 34 | — | — | — | — | — |
| 1995–96 | Newcastle Warriors | BHL | 35 | 21 | 36 | 57 | 74 | 6 | 3 | 6 | 9 | 10 |
| 1996–97 | Basingstoke Bison | BISL | 42 | 11 | 17 | 28 | 26 | 3 | 1 | 1 | 2 | 6 |
| 1997–98 | Basingstoke Bison | BISL | 41 | 4 | 16 | 20 | 72 | 6 | 1 | 1 | 2 | 2 |
| 1998–99 | Grefrather EV | Germany2 | 35 | 6 | 11 | 17 | 28 | — | — | — | — | — |
| 1998–99 | Fife Flyers | BNL | 12 | 3 | 7 | 10 | 10 | 8 | 6 | 8 | 14 | 10 |
| 1999–00 | Hull Thunder | BNL | 35 | 8 | 24 | 32 | 41 | 6 | 3 | 3 | 6 | 14 |
| BHL totals | | | 123 | 130 | 144 | 274 | 136 | 18 | 21 | 25 | 46 | 40 |
| BISL totals | | | 83 | 15 | 33 | 48 | 98 | 9 | 2 | 2 | 4 | 8 |
| BNL totals | | | 47 | 11 | 31 | 42 | 51 | 14 | 9 | 11 | 20 | 24 |
