= Adam Walker (ice hockey) =

Scottish ice hockey player (born 1986)

- Born: 14 July 1986 (age 40) Kirkcaldy, Scotland
- Height: 6 ft 0 in (183 cm)
- Weight: 200 lb (91 kg; 14 st 4 lb)
- Position: Center
- Shot: Right
- SNL team Former teams: Paisley Pirates; Fife Flyers; Guildford Flames; Swindon Wildcats; Cardiff Devils; Manchester Phoenix; Braehead Clan; Telford Tigers
- Playing career: 2001–2015

Adam Walker (born 14 July 1986) is a Scottish professional ice hockey player. He is currently the head coach of the Paisley Pirates of the Scottish National League. He previously in the British Elite Ice Hockey League for the Cardiff Devils, Manchester Phoenix and the Braehead Clan.

== Career ==
In 2001, Walker began his career icing for the Fife Flyers, his local team, playing at BNL level. Walker made his professional debut at only 14 years of age, registering an assist in his first game. Up until the 2003/04 season, Walker became much more of a regular player, icing on 31 occasions, and gaining his first professional goal. He also represented Great Britain at under 18 and under 20 levels contributing to 3 gold medals along the way and being named top scorer and best player of the tournament in his last appearance at under 20.

The following season, Walker remained in the BNL but moved to play for the Guildford Flames, as well as making several appearances for their U-19 team, the Guildford Phoenix. Again Walker was a regular player, turning out another 31 times. Walker was again on the move the following summer, and after the collapse of the BNL signed for the Swindon Wildcats in the EPL. This proved to be Walker's breakout season, in which he managed a total of 63 points in 41 games.

This return of points led to him signing for the Cardiff Devils, a team playing in the top tier of British Ice Hockey, the EIHL. Opportunities proved to be limited though, and so in the summer of 2006, Walker moved north to link up with fellow Scot Tony Hand, the player/coach of the Manchester Phoenix.

In his first season as a Phoenix player, Walker gave a return of 23 points in 58 games, a statistic which included a hat-trick against the Basingstoke Bison. He was also selected to play in the EIHL All Star game.

Walker made the decision to stay with the Phoenix the following season, and featured in an injury hit season throughout 2007/08, managing to score 10 points along the way.

Walker's consistency and work rate again convinced head coach Hand to re-sign him for the 2008/09 campaign where he picked up 29 points in 69 games.

Walker stayed with the Phoenix for a fourth season through contract, despite the club's decision to move to the EPIHL and several Elite league teams chasing his signature. During the 2009/2010 season, Walker produced a career high of 51 goals and 102 points in 54 games.

It was announced that Walker would return to the Elite League, joining newcomers Braehead Clan for the 2010/2011 season. He re-signed for a second season with the Clan on 21 April 2011 where he produced his best points tally in the Elite League with the Clan scoring 26 points. Walker further extended his contract for a third season on 9 February 2012.

On 30 October 2013 Walker signed for the EPIHL's Telford Tigers. On 3 June 2014 he returned to the Manchester Phoenix.

Walker retired after the 2014–15 season and became head coach of the Dundee Comets of the Scottish National League in 2016. In 2017, he was named head coach of the Paisley Pirates and came out of retirement to register himself as a player-head coach. He scored 22 goals in 13 games with a total of 37 points in his first season after his two-year retirement.

Throughout his professional career Walker has played a total of 701 games for club and represented Great Britain on 30 occasions.

== Personal life ==
His younger brother Ben Walker is also an ice hockey player and is currently playing in the SNL with the Paisley Pirates.

He is married to Joanna Patterson who is a former Irish Commonwealth athlete in both Cycling and 400m sprinting

== Career statistics ==
			Regular season					Playoffs
Season	Team	League	GP	G	A	Pts	PIM	GP	G	A	Pts	PIM
2000–01	Fife Flyers	BNL	1	0	1	1	0	—	—	—	—	—
2001–02	Fife Flyers	BNL	2	0	0	0	0	1	0	0	0	0
2002–03	Fife Flyers	BNL	9	0	0	0	0	6	0	1	1	0
2003–04	Fife Flyers	BNL	31	0	4	4	0	8	1	0	1	0
2004–05	Guildford Flames	BNL	34	0	1	1	2	15	1	0	1	0
2004–05	Guildford Phoenix	England U19	5	8	9	17	6	—	—	—	—	—
2005–06	Swindon Wildcats	EPIHL	41	24	39	63	22	6	1	3	4	2
2005–06	Cardiff Devils	EIHL	1	0	0	0	0	—	—	—	—	—
2006–07	Manchester Phoenix	EIHL	52	13	9	22	18	2	0	1	1	0
2007–08	Manchester Phoenix	EIHL	54	5	4	9	10	2	0	0	0	0
2008–09	Manchester Phoenix	EIHL	54	15	9	24	6	2	0	0	0	0
2009–10	Manchester Phoenix	EPIHL	54	49	53	102	16	3	1	1	2	0
2010–11	Braehead Clan	EIHL	54	7	13	20	32	2	0	0	0	0
2011–12	Braehead Clan	EIHL	54	12	14	26	12	2	0	0	0	0
2012–13	Braehead Clan	EIHL	45	3	8	11	6	2	0	0	0	0
2013–14	Telford Tigers	EPIHL	37	15	25	40	14	2	1	0	1	2
2014–15	Manchester Phoenix	EPIHL	44	13	23	36	6	4	1	2	3	2
2017–18	Paisley Pirates	SNL	13	22	15	37	6	—	—	—	—	—
2018–19	Paisley Pirates	SNL	10	15	19	34	8	—	—	—	—	—
2019–20	Paisley Pirates	SNL	14	10	16	26	18	—	—	—	—	—
2021–22	Paisley Pirates	SNL	12	3	11	14	4	—	—	—	—	—
EIHL totals			314	55	57	112	84	12	0	1	1	0
EPIHL totals			176	101	140	241	58	15	4	6	10	6
