= Scott Campbell (ice hockey, born 1972) =

Scottish ice hockey player

- Born: 22 January 1972 (age 53) Glasgow, Scotland
- Height: 6 ft 1 in (185 cm)
- Weight: 190 lb (86 kg; 13 st 8 lb)
- Position: Defence
- Caught: Left
- Played for: AHL; Cape Breton Oilers; Rochester Americans; ECHL; Toledo Storm; Charlotte Checkers; CoHL; Muskegon Fury; Brantford Smoke; BHL; Newcastle Warriors; BISL; Sheffield Steelers; Bracknell Bees; London Knights; Manchester Storm; Ayr Scottish Eagles; BNL; Guildford Flames; Fife Flyers; Dundee Stars; Newcastle Vipers
- National team: Great Britain
- NHL draft: Undrafted
- Playing career: 1993–2004

Scott Campbell (born 22 January 1972) is a Scottish retired ice hockey defenceman.

== Career ==
Campbell twice won the BH Cup, first as a member of the 1996–1997 Sheffield Steelers (who were also the BISL Playoff Champions), and again as a member of the 1997–1998 Bracknell Bees. As a member of the 2001–2002 Guildford Flames, Campbell captured both the BNL Championship and the BNL Playoff Championship.

Campbell competed as a member of the Great Britain men's national ice hockey team at both the 2002 and 2003 Men's World Ice Hockey Championships.

He later worked as a coach with the Ontario Tech Ridgebacks.

== Career statistics ==
			Regular season					Playoffs
Season	Team	League	GP	G	A	Pts	PIM	GP	G	A	Pts	PIM
1988–89	Peterborough Petes	OHL	29	0	1	1	16	3	0	0	0	0
1989–90	Peterborough Petes	OHL	61	3	24	27	63	11	2	2	4	10
1990–91	Peterborough Petes	OHL	62	6	21	27	65	4	0	4	4	0
1991–92	Niagara Falls Thunder	OHL	55	13	37	50	100	15	1	3	4	33
1992–93	Niagara Falls Thunder	OHL	31	4	26	30	65	4	0	1	1	4
1992–93	Cape Breton Oilers	AHL	10	0	0	0	8	—	—	—	—	—
1992–93	Toledo Storm	ECHL	—	—	—	—	—	5	0	2	2	17
1993–94	Muskegon Fury	CoHL	34	2	15	17	40	3	2	2	4	14
1994–95	Rochester Americans	AHL	3	0	0	0	15	—	—	—	—	—
1994–95	Muskegon Fury	CoHL	51	7	28	35	79	16	2	8	10	58
1995–96	Charlotte Checkers	ECHL	3	0	1	1	27	—	—	—	—	—
1995–96	Newcastle Warriors	BHL	12	4	6	10	100	3	0	1	1	4
1996–97	Sheffield Steelers	BISL	39	1	10	11	99	8	0	1	1	8
1997–98	Bracknell Bees	BISL	33	1	5	6	58	4	1	0	1	48
1998–99	HC Lions Courmaosta	Italy	29	2	9	11	43	—	—	—	—	—
1998–99	HC Merano	Italy	20	2	1	3	61	—	—	—	—	—
1999–00	London Knights	BISL	10	0	2	2	18	—	—	—	—	—
1999–00	Manchester Storm	BISL	21	2	2	4	57	—	—	—	—	—
2000–01	Guildford Flames	BNL	27	3	28	31	117	6	0	1	1	43
2001–02	Guildford Flames	BNL	26	5	18	23	67	7	1	3	4	20
2002–03	Scottish Eagles	BISL	3	0	0	0	2	—	—	—	—	—
2002–03	Fife Flyers	BNL	3	3	0	3	2	—	—	—	—	—
2002–03	Dundee Stars	BNL	3	0	1	1	12	—	—	—	—	—
2002–03	Newcastle Vipers	BNL	14	1	4	5	52	5	0	0	0	30
2003–04	Newcastle Vipers	BNL	20	0	7	7	34	10	2	2	4	20
BISL totals			106	4	19	23	234	12	1	1	2	56
