= Randy Smith (ice hockey) =

Canadian ice hockey player and coach

- Born: July 7, 1965 (age 61) Saskatoon, Saskatchewan, Canada
- Height: 6 ft 4 in (193 cm)
- Weight: 200 lb (91 kg; 14 st 4 lb)
- Position: Centre
- Shot: Left
- Played for: Minnesota North Stars
- Playing career: 1985–2000
Medal record
Representing Canada
Olympic Games
Silver medal – second place	1992 Albertville

Randolph William Smith (born July 7, 1965) is a Canadian former professional ice hockey player and coach.

== Career ==
Smith won a silver medal at the 1992 Winter Olympics. He also played three games in the National Hockey League with the Minnesota North Stars in 1986 and 1987. Smith played his final years of ice hockey in the United Kingdom for the Peterborough Pirates and Cardiff Devils. Smith also had a brief coaching stint with the Swift Current Broncos of the Western Hockey League.

== Career statistics ==
=== Regular season and playoffs ===
			Regular season					Playoffs
Season	Team	League	GP	G	A	Pts	PIM	GP	G	A	Pts	PIM
1982–83	Battleford Barons	SJHL	65	25	20	45	141	—	—	—	—	—
1982–83	Saskatoon Blades	WHL	2	2	0	2	0	—	—	—	—	—
1983–84	Saskatoon Blades	WHL	69	19	21	40	53	—	—	—	—	—
1984–85	Saskatoon Blades	WHL	25	6	16	22	9	—	—	—	—	—
1984–85	Calgary Wranglers	WHL	46	28	35	63	17	8	4	3	7	0
1985–86	Saskatoon Blades	WHL	70	60	86	146	44	9	4	9	13	4
1985–86	Minnesota North Stars	NHL	1	0	0	0	0	—	—	—	—	—
1986–87	Minnesota North Stars	NHL	2	0	0	0	0	—	—	—	—	—
1986–87	Springfield Indians	AHL	75	20	44	64	24	—	—	—	—	—
1987–88	Kalamazoo Wings	IHL	77	13	43	56	54	6	0	8	8	2
1988–89	Kalamazoo Wings	IHL	23	4	9	13	2	—	—	—	—	—
1988–89	Maine Mariners	AHL	33	9	16	25	34	—	—	—	—	—
1989–90	Kalamazoo Wings	IHL	8	1	2	3	12	—	—	—	—	—
1989–90	Salt Lake Golden Eagles	IHL	30	5	6	11	10	3	0	0	0	0
1990–91	Canadian National Team	Intl	58	17	39	56	42	—	—	—	—	—
1991–92	Canadian National Team	Intl	59	20	25	45	24	—	—	—	—	—
1991–92	EHC Biel Bienne	NDA	3	1	2	3	10	4	0	3	3	16
1992–93	EC KAC	AUT	39	26	18	44	—	—	—	—	—	—
1993–94	Las Vegas Thunder	IHL	53	7	7	14	78	—	—	—	—	—
1994–95	Peterborough Pirates	BHL	44	82	84	166	67	—	—	—	—	—
1995–96	Cardiff Devils	BHL	36	51	49	100	38	6	4	2	6	20
1997–98	Newcastle Cobras	BISL	40	9	18	27	32	6	2	5	7	2
1998–99	Peterborough Pirates	BNL	29	30	44	74	22	5	1	5	6	6
1999–00	Peterborough Pirates	BNL	36	43	44	87	30	8	9	10	19	24
IHL totals			191	30	67	97	156	9	0	8	8	2
NHL totals			3	0	0	0	0	—	—	—	—	—

=== International ===
Year	Team	Event	GP	G	A	Pts	PIM
1991	Canada	WC	10	0	0	0	8
1992	Canada	OLY	8	1	7	8	4
1992	Canada	WC	6	1	0	1	4
Senior totals			24	2	7	9	16

== Awards ==
- WHL East Second All Star Team – 1986
