= Peter Kasowski =

- Born: March 10, 1969 (age 57) Edmonton, Alberta, Canada
- Height: 6 ft 0 in (183 cm)
- Weight: 187 lb (85 kg; 13 st 5 lb)
- Position: Defense
- Shot: Left
- Played for: Swift Current Broncos; Seattle Thunderbirds; Roanoke Valley Rebels; Salt Lake Golden Eagles; Peoria Rivermen; Dayton Bombers; Guildford Flames
- NHL draft: 241st overall, 1989; Hartford Whalers
- Playing career: 1987–2000

Peter Kasowski (born March 19, 1969) is a Canadian former ice hockey and inline hockey player. He was drafted by the Hartford Whalers of the NHL in 1989.

== Junior career ==
Kasowski played in the WHL for 3 years for Swift Current Broncos and Seattle Thunderbirds. Over these 3 years he scored 324 points in 212 games. His best season being 1988–89 when he scored 131 points in 72 games, he was subsequently drafted by the NHL's Hartford Whalers in the 12th round.

== Professional ice hockey career ==
Kasowski finished his junior career and was signed by Roanoke Valley Rebels of the ECHL where he spent 2 successful years scoring 54 and 76 points in each of the 36 game seasons. During the 1991–92 season, he was signed to play for the Salt Lake Golden Eagles of the IHL where he made 9 appearances. The 1992–93 season was split between Dayton Bombers of the ECHL where he scored 57 points in 51 games, Peoria Rivermen of the IHL where he contributed 5 goals and 5 assists in 22 games.

=== 1994–1996: Inline hockey ===
Through the 1994, 1995 and 1996 seasons Kasowski spent his time playing in Roller Hockey International. He played for Edmonton Sled Dogs and latterly Los Angeles Blades. He scored 39 goals, 48 assists for 87 points in 68 career games.

=== Ice hockey career: continued ===
In 1997, Kasowski signed to play in Britain for Guildford Flames in the BNL. He finished the season as the team's second-top scorer with 91 points in 44 games. His two subsequent seasons with the Flames were less productive, but effective all the same, scoring 46 and 53 points in 1998/99 and 99/00 respectively. He was not re-signed in 2000 and has not played since.

== Career statistics ==
			Regular season					Playoffs
Season	Team	League	GP	G	A	Pts	PIM	GP	G	A	Pts	PIM
1987–88	Swift Current Broncos	WHL	70	33	31	64	27	10	5	1	6	8
1988–89	Swift Current Broncos	WHL	72	58	73	131	46	7	3	4	7	5
1989–90	Swift Current Broncos	WHL	28	19	34	53	28	—	—	—	—	—
1989–90	Seattle Thunderbirds	WHL	42	31	45	76	16	13	8	14	22	10
1990–91	Roanoke Valley Rebels	ECHL	36	16	38	54	22	—	—	—	—	—
1991–92	Salt Lake Golden Eagles	IHL	9	1	2	3	2	—	—	—	—	—
1991–92	Roanoke Valley Rebels	ECHL	36	26	50	76	49	7	2	8	10	10
1992–93	Peoria Rivermen	IHL	22	5	5	10	24	4	0	0	0	14
1992–93	Dayton Bombers	ECHL	51	17	40	57	81	3	1	3	4	2
1995–96	Northern Alberta Institute of Technology	ACAC	22	18	32	50	24	—	—	—	—	—
1997–98	Guildford Flames	BNL	44	44	47	91	24	10	7	10	17	10
1998–99	Guildford Flames	BNL	32	20	26	46	10	7	3	7	10	4
1999–00	Guildford Flames	BNL	36	26	27	53	30	6	5	2	7	14
ECHL totals			123	59	128	187	152	10	3	11	14	12
