= Greg Kuznik =

Canadian-born Slovenian ice hockey player

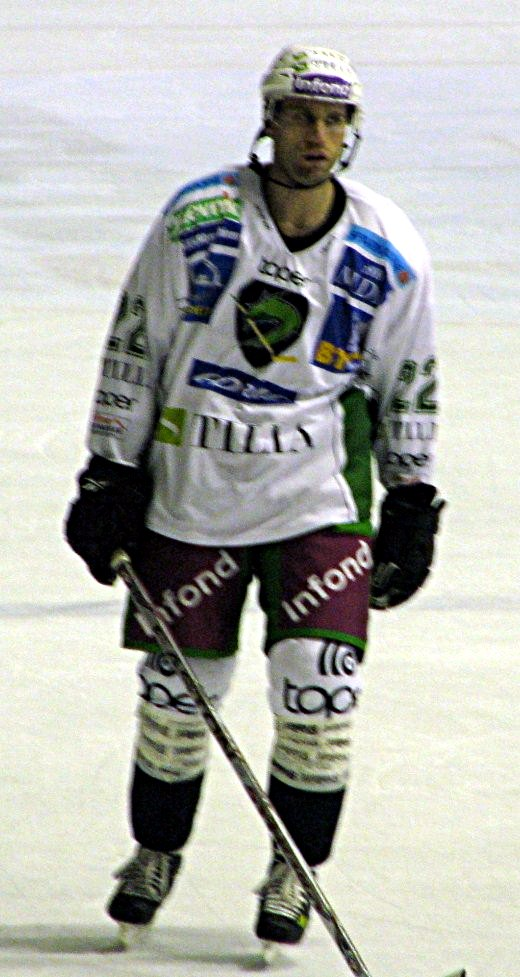
- Born: June 12, 1978 (age 47) Prince George, British Columbia, Canada
- Height: 6 ft 0 in (183 cm)
- Weight: 185 lb (84 kg; 13 st 3 lb)
- Position: Defence
- Shot: Left
- Played for: Carolina Hurricanes
- National team: Slovenia
- NHL draft: 171st overall, 1996; Hartford Whalers
- Playing career: 1998–2013

Gregory Kuznik (/ˈkuːznɪk/ KOOZ-nik; Slovene: Greg Kužnik) (born June 12, 1978) is a Canadian-born Slovene former ice hockey player.

== Career ==
Kuznik was drafted 171st by the Hartford Whalers in the 1996 NHL entry draft. In the 2000–01 NHL season, he played one game for the Carolina Hurricanes. Since 2003 he has played in Europe, spending two seasons in the British National League for the Fife Flyers and two seasons in Italy's Serie A league for Sportiva Hockey Club Fassa. In 2007, he moved to Slovenian team HDD Olimpija Ljubljana in the EBEL league.

He participated at the 2011 IIHF World Championship as a member of the Slovenia men's national ice hockey team.

== Career statistics ==
			Regular season					Playoffs
Season	Team	League	GP	G	A	Pts	PIM	GP	G	A	Pts	PIM
1994–95	Royal City Outlaws	BCJHL	45	2	13	15	83	—	—	—	—	—
1995–96	Seattle Thunderbirds	WHL	70	2	13	15	149	5	0	0	0	6
1996–97	Seattle Thunderbirds	WHL	70	4	9	13	181	14	0	2	2	26
1997–98	Seattle Thunderbirds	WHL	72	5	12	17	197	5	0	0	0	4
1998–99	Florida Everglades	ECHL	50	6	8	14	110	5	1	0	1	0
1998–99	Beast of New Haven	AHL	27	1	0	1	33	—	—	—	—	—
1999–00	Cincinnati Cyclones	IHL	46	0	3	3	53	4	0	0	0	4
1999–00	Dayton Bombers	ECHL	7	1	0	1	16	—	—	—	—	—
1999–00	Florida Everglades	ECHL	9	1	4	5	6	3	0	0	0	2
2000–01	Carolina Hurricanes	NHL	1	0	0	0	0	—	—	—	—	—
2000–01	Cincinnati Cyclones	IHL	73	0	7	7	72	5	0	1	1	4
2001–02	Lowell Lock Monsters	AHL	58	3	8	11	40	5	0	0	0	8
2002–03	Lowell Lock Monsters	AHL	61	2	3	5	74	—	—	—	—	—
2003–04	Fife Flyers	BNL	36	10	18	28	28	12	2	5	7	4
2004–05	Fife Flyers	BNL	36	7	16	25	22	13	3	5	8	16
2005–06	HC Fassa	Italy	47	18	8	26	94	—	—	—	—	—
2006–07	HC Fassa	Italy	32	10	12	22	80	—	—	—	—	—
2007–08	Olimpija Ljubljana	EBEL	42	4	8	12	107	—	—	—	—	—
2007–08	Olimpija Ljubljana	Slovenia	—	—	—	—	—	7	0	1	1	18
2008–09	Olimpija Ljubljana	EBEL	54	3	6	9	123	—	—	—	—	—
2008–09	Olimpija Ljubljana	Slovenia	—	—	—	—	—	7	1	1	2	8
2009–10	Olimpija Ljubljana	EBEL	37	5	13	18	73	—	—	—	—	—
2009–10	SG Pontebba	Italy	13	2	8	10	8	7	2	0	2	0
2010–11	Villacher SV	EBEL	52	4	14	18	79	10	1	0	1	8
2011–12	Villacher SV	EBEL	48	4	9	13	80	—	—	—	—	—
2012–13	HC Fassa	Italy	38	1	13	14	64	—	—	—	—	—
NHL totals			1	0	0	0	0	—	—	—	—	—
AHL totals			146	6	11	17	147	5	0	0	0	8
