= Cam Plante =

Canadian ice hockey player

- Born: March 12, 1964 (age 62) Brandon, Manitoba, Canada
- Height: 6 ft 0 in (183 cm)
- Weight: 185 lb (84 kg; 13 st 3 lb)
- Position: Defence
- Shot: Right
- Played for: Toronto Maple Leafs
- NHL draft: 128th overall, 1983; Toronto Maple Leafs
- Playing career: 1984–1998

Cam Plante (born March 12, 1964) is a Canadian former professional ice hockey defenceman. He was drafted in the seventh round, 128th overall, by the Toronto Maple Leafs in the 1983 NHL entry draft. He played two games in the National Hockey League with the Maple Leafs in the 1984–85 season.

Plante holds the Western Hockey League record for points in a season by a defenceman. He scored 140 points as a member of the Brandon Wheat Kings in the 1983–84 WHL season. During 72 games that season he scored 22 goals and had 118 assists.

He finished his playing career with the Wichita Thunder of the CHL, having returned to North America following four seasons on the United Kingdom. Most of that time was spent with the Peterborough Pirates, but also encompassed short spells with the Chelmsford Chieftains and Humberside Hawks.

He is the father of former Florida Panthers prospect Tyler Plante and former Edmonton Oilers prospect Alex Plante.

== Career statistics ==
=== Regular season and playoffs ===
| | | | Regular season | | | | | Playoffs |
| Season | Team | League | GP | G | A | Pts | PIM | GP | G | A | Pts | PIM |
|---|---|---|---|---|---|---|---|---|---|---|---|---|
| 1980–81 | Brandon Wheat Kings | WHL | 70 | 3 | 14 | 17 | 17 | 5 | 0 | 2 | 2 | 0 |
| 1981–82 | Brandon Wheat Kings | WHL | 36 | 4 | 12 | 16 | 22 | 4 | 0 | 6 | 6 | 4 |
| 1982–83 | Brandon Wheat Kings | WHL | 56 | 19 | 56 | 75 | 71 | — | — | — | — | — |
| 1983–84 | Brandon Wheat Kings | WHL | 72 | 22 | 118 | 140 | 96 | 11 | 4 | 16 | 20 | 14 |
| 1984–85 | St. Catharines Saints | AHL | 54 | 5 | 31 | 36 | 42 | — | — | — | — | — |
| 1984–85 | Toronto Maple Leafs | NHL | 2 | 0 | 0 | 0 | 0 | — | — | — | — | — |
| 1985–86 | St. Catharines Saints | AHL | 49 | 6 | 15 | 21 | 28 | 5 | 0 | 3 | 3 | 2 |
| 1986–87 | Milwaukee Admirals | IHL | 56 | 7 | 47 | 54 | 44 | 5 | 2 | 2 | 4 | 4 |
| 1986–87 | Newmarket Saints | AHL | 19 | 3 | 4 | 7 | 14 | — | — | — | — | — |
| 1987–88 | Newmarket Saints | AHL | 18 | 2 | 8 | 10 | 14 | — | — | — | — | — |
| 1987–88 | Villacher SV | EBEL | 11 | 2 | 10 | 12 | 14 | — | — | — | — | — |
| 1987–88 | EHC Basel | NLB | 18 | 10 | 25 | 35 | 60 | — | — | — | — | — |
| 1988–89 | HC Davos | NLA | 6 | 3 | 2 | 5 | 6 | — | — | — | — | — |
| 1989–90 | Krefelder EV 1981 | GER-2 | 12 | 1 | 19 | 20 | 10 | — | — | — | — | — |
| 1989–90 | Fort Wayne Komets | IHL | 61 | 7 | 42 | 49 | 45 | 7 | 1 | 6 | 7 | 2 |
| 1990–91 | Kansas City Blades | IHL | 43 | 6 | 14 | 20 | 34 | — | — | — | — | — |
| 1991–92 | Thunder Bay Thunder Hawks | CoIHL | 54 | 16 | 57 | 73 | 32 | 10 | 0 | 8 | 8 | 6 |
| 1992–93 | Norwich & Peterborough Pirates | BHL | 25 | 14 | 52 | 66 | 93 | 6 | 7 | 20 | 27 | 4 |
| 1993–94 | Peterborough Pirates | BHL | 37 | 13 | 55 | 68 | 56 | 6 | 5 | 7 | 12 | 20 |
| 1994–95 | Peterborough Pirates | BHL | 34 | 22 | 52 | 74 | 60 | 3 | 3 | 6 | 9 | 18 |
| 1995–96 | Peterborough Pirates | BD1 | 16 | 4 | 32 | 36 | 93 | — | — | — | — | — |
| 1995–96 | Chelmsford Chieftains | BD1 | 10 | 8 | 15 | 23 | 22 | — | — | — | — | — |
| 1995–96 | Humberside Hawks | BHL | 9 | 3 | 5 | 8 | 18 | 7 | 2 | 14 | 16 | 20 |
| 1996–97 | Wichita Thunder | CHL | 55 | 12 | 63 | 75 | 74 | 9 | 2 | 7 | 9 | 18 |
| 1997–98 | Wichita Thunder | CHL | 67 | 8 | 62 | 70 | 112 | 14 | 0 | 8 | 8 | 16 |
| AHL totals | | | 140 | 16 | 58 | 74 | 98 | 5 | 0 | 3 | 3 | 2 |
| NHL totals | | | 2 | 0 | 0 | 0 | 0 | — | — | — | — | — |

== Awards ==
- WHL East First All-Star Team – 1984
