= Brent Pope =

Canadian ice hockey player and coach (1973–2022)

- Born: 20 February 1973 Hamilton, Ontario, Canada
- Died: 1 November 2022 (aged 49) Hamilton, Ontario, Canada
- Height: 6 ft 3 in (191 cm)
- Weight: 235 lb (107 kg; 16 st 11 lb)
- Position: Defence
- Shot: Right
- Played for: Cardiff Devils; Romford Raiders; Slough Jets; Sheffield Scimitars; London Racers; Basingstoke Bison; Hull Stingrays; Solihull MK Kings; Nottingham Panthers; Florida Everblades; Tallahassee Tiger Sharks; London Knights; Wheeling Thunderbirds; Cape Breton Oilers
- National team: Great Britain
- Playing career: 1993–2008

Brent Pope (20 February 1973 – 1 November 2022) was a Canadian ice hockey player, and Managing Director of the Cardiff Devils in the Elite Ice Hockey League. Pope was a financial consultant in his hometown area of Hamilton, Ontario and until his death he maintained an active freelance broadcaster career with the Olympic Broadcasting Services and the Olympic Channel.

== Playing career ==
Pope started his professional career playing for Cape Breton Oilers and Wheeling Thunderbirds as a free agent, signing with the Edmonton Oilers in 1992. In 1996, Pope moved to the United Kingdom signing for the Cardiff Devils. He spent three seasons with the Devils, helping them win the 1996–97 Ice Hockey Superleague championship and the 1998–99 Ice Hockey Superleague Playoff Championship. He went on to play for the GB National Men's Hockey programme between 2002–04 at the World Championship level as well as various clubs in England and North America.

== Post-playing career ==
In May 2007, Pope was appointed Cardiff Devils general manager after winning the Challenge Cup as Co-Coach, Cardiff Devils. He spent time in various roles at the club, and replaced Gerad Adams as head coach in October 2013. Pope created the UK registered charity the Devils Community Foundation in October 2008 incorporating the Junior Devils development into the Senior Devils community outreach programme. Head of the DCF until 2013, Pope coached at both the England U14 & U16 age levels whilst overseeing the junior Devils development. In 2010, Pope completed his MA in Sports Development & Coaching at Cardiff Metropolitan University and in January 2013 became Managing Director of the professional Cardiff Devils. In October 2013, Pope became interim Head Coach for the Elite Ice Hockey League Devils winning over .600% of games coached before retiring from his position in April 2014.

== Media work ==
Pope was a sports commentator and voice over artist. A BBC Sport commentator for ice hockey at the 2006 Turin Olympics, 2010 Vancouver and Sochi 2014 Winter Olympics.

Pope worked for the Olympic Broadcasting Services (OBS) during the London 2012 Olympics commentating on Hockey, Handball, Table Tennis, Fencing and Water Polo. Pope commentated as venue announcer for the Wheelchair Rugby event during the London 2012 Paralympic Games. A Para Ice Hockey Commentator for the OBS during the Turin 2006, Sochi 2014 and 2018 Pyeongchang Paralympics. In January 2011, the Canadian/Brit commentated for the OBS at the Asian Winter Games Men's Ice Hockey Tournament in Astana, Kazakhstan. Pope commentated for honorary patron Prince Harry during the inaugural Invictus Games in 2014 for the Wheelchair Rugby competition. The event was hosted in recognition of injured, sick and wounded servicemen & women from around the world at London's Queen Elizabeth Olympic Park. In 2015, Pope commentated for the ISB (International Sports Broadcasting) at the Baku, Azerbaijan European Games and the Toronto 2015 Pan Am Games on the Men's and Women's Waterpolo, Volleyball, Fencing, Beach Volleyball and Wheelchair Rugby.

Pope was Head of English Ice Hockey Commentary for the Champions Hockey League in Europe between 2014–17 becoming Host of the CHL Centre Ice Online Programme in 2015/16. He covered a variety of sports as a commentator for the OBS Olympic Broadcasting Services during both the Rio 2016 Olympic & Paralympic Games. During Pyeongchang 2018, he commentated for the OBS's Global Feed service on both the Men's and Women's Ice Hockey Tournaments as well as the Para Ice Hockey Tournament during the 2018 Paralympics in South Korea.

== Personal life and death ==
Pope was born in Hamilton, Ontario and held both a Canadian and British passport. He lived in Hamilton and worked as a financial adviser. Pope was a member of the Cardiff Metropolitan University – London 2012 Hall of Fame.

Pope died of cancer in Hamilton on 1 November 2022, at the age of 49.

== Career statistics ==
			Regular season					Playoffs
Season	Team	League	GP	G	A	Pts	PIM	GP	G	A	Pts	PIM
1989–90	Peterborough Petes	OHL	31	0	7	7	14	—	—	—	—	—
1989–90	Peterborough Roadrunners	COJHL	9	1	3	4	20	—	—	—	—	—
1990–91	Peterborough Petes	OHL	29	3	11	14	15	—	—	—	—	—
1990–91	Dukes of Hamilton	OHL	29	1	6	7	30	4	0	1	1	13
1991–92	Guelph Storm	OHL	65	10	38	48	108	—	—	—	—	—
1992–93	Guelph Storm	OHL	33	10	14	24	40	—	—	—	—	—
1992–93	Ottawa 67's	OHL	26	5	8	13	18	—	—	—	—	—
1992–93	Wheeling Nailers	ECHL	—	—	—	—	—	2	0	0	0	6
1993–94	Wheeling Nailers	ECHL	63	8	19	27	230	9	0	2	2	32
1994–95	Wheeling Nailers	ECHL	57	7	17	24	235	3	1	1	2	2
1994–95	Cape Breton Oilers	AHL	9	0	1	1	25	—	—	—	—	—
1995–96	Wheeling Nailers	ECHL	17	4	11	15	63	7	0	0	0	22
1995–96	Cape Breton Oilers	AHL	40	2	9	11	61	—	—	—	—	—
1996–97	Cardiff Devils	BISL	39	0	10	10	109	7	0	0	0	12
1997–98	Cardiff Devils	BISL	42	4	9	13	98	9	0	5	5	14
1998–99	Cardiff Devils	BISL	40	1	10	11	100	8	2	2	4	6
1999–00	Nottingham Panthers	BISL	42	2	10	12	90	6	0	0	0	4
2000–01	London Knights	BISL	5	1	3	4	6	—	—	—	—	—
2000–01	Tallahassee Tiger Sharks	ECHL	39	0	6	6	81	—	—	—	—	—
2000–01	Florida Everblades	ECHL	31	0	5	5	51	5	0	1	1	8
2001–02	Nottingham Panthers	BISL	48	1	12	13	63	6	0	0	0	4
2002–03	Solihull MK Kings	BNL	32	5	13	18	100	—	—	—	—	—
2003–04	Hull Stingrays	BNL	33	4	15	19	122	—	—	—	—	—
2004–05	London Racers	EIHL	14	0	4	4	26	—	—	—	—	—
2004–05	Basingstoke Bison	EIHL	12	0	7	7	48	—	—	—	—	—
2005–06	Sheffield Scimitars	EPIHL	41	3	18	21	168	8	2	1	3	48
2006–07	Romford Raiders	EPIHL	19	2	9	11	94	—	—	—	—	—
2006–07	Slough Jets	EPIHL	3	0	1	1	16	—	—	—	—	—
2007–08	Cardiff Devils	EIHL	8	0	0	0	32	—	—	—	—	—
2008–09	Cardiff Devils ENL	ENL	9	3	4	7	60	—	—	—	—	—
2009–10	Cardiff Devils ENL	ENL	12	3	8	11	48	—	—	—	—	—
2010–11	Cardiff Devils ENL	ENL	6	1	3	4	72	—	—	—	—	—
2011–12	Cardiff Devils ENL	ENL	3	0	3	3	24	—	—	—	—	—
AHL totals			49	2	10	12	86	—	—	—	—	—
ECHL totals			207	19	58	77	660	26	1	4	5	70
