= Marián Smerčiak =

Slovak ice hockey player

- Born: December 24, 1972 (age 53) Liptovský Mikuláš, Czechoslovakia
- Height: 6 ft 0 in (183 cm)
- Weight: 192 lb (87 kg; 13 st 10 lb)
- Position: Defence
- Shot: Left
- Played for: HK Dukla Trenčín; MHk 32 Liptovský Mikuláš; HC Slovan Bratislava; HK Spišská Nová Ves
- National team: Slovakia
- Playing career: 1990–2014

Marián Smerčiak (born 24 December 1972) is a Slovak retired professional ice hockey defenceman.

== Career ==
Smerčiak played in the Slovak Extraliga for HK Dukla Trenčín, MHk 32 Liptovský Mikuláš, HC Slovan Bratislava and HK Spišská Nová Ves. He also played in the 1994 Winter Olympics and the 1996 World Championship for the Slovakia national team.

== Career statistics ==
=== Regular season and playoffs ===
			Regular season					Playoffs
Season	Team	League	GP	G	A	Pts	PIM	GP	G	A	Pts	PIM
1990–91	ASVŠ Dukla Trenčín	TCH	6	0	0	0	0	—	—	—	—	—
1991–92	ASVŠ Dukla Trenčín	TCH	38	2	4	6	—	13	0	0	0	—
1992–93	ASVŠ Dukla Trenčín	TCH	42	1	5	6	63	—	—	—	—	—
1993–94	HK Dukla Trenčín	SVK	45	4	10	14	—	—	—	—	—	—
1994–95	HK Dukla Trenčín	SVK	35	4	4	8	73	9	0	1	1	12
1995–96	HK Dukla Trenčín	SVK	48	6	7	13	91	—	—	—	—	—
1996–97	HK Dukla Trenčín	SVK	44	7	13	20	62	—	—	—	—	—
1997–98	HK Dukla Trenčín	SVK	41	3	7	10	30	—	—	—	—	—
1998–99	HK Dukla Trenčín	SVK	44	6	6	12	28	—	—	—	—	—
1999–2000	HK Dukla Trenčín	SVK	49	5	15	20	112	—	—	—	—	—
2000–01	HK 32 Liptovský Mikuláš	SVK	55	9	17	26	80	—	—	—	—	—
2001–02	HK Dukla Trenčín	SVK	50	4	12	16	40	—	—	—	—	—
2002–03	HK 32 Liptovský Mikuláš	SVK	47	5	6	11	82	—	—	—	—	—
2002–03	HC Slovan Bratislava	SVK	7	0	4	4	2	—	—	—	—	—
2003–04	Guildford Flames	GBR.2	36	4	20	24	30	14	3	6	9	20
2004–05	Guildford Flames	GBR.2	37	4	6	10	24	15	5	2	7	6
2005–06	Guildford Flames	EPIHL	46	12	19	31	34	8	5	3	8	4
2006–07	Guildford Flames	EPIHL	44	13	24	37	132	6	1	2	3	4
2007–08	Rostock Piranhas	DEU.3	40	6	12	18	44	—	—	—	—	—
2008–09	HK Spišská Nová Ves	SVK.2	31	3	11	14	32	9	0	2	2	6
2009–10	HK Spišská Nová Ves	SVK	11	0	3	3	16	—	—	—	—	—
2009–10	HK Dukla Trenčín	SVK	2	0	0	0	0	—	—	—	—	—
2009–10	HK 95 Považská Bystrica	SVK.2	6	0	5	5	0	—	—	—	—	—
2010–11	HK 95 Považská Bystrica	SVK.2	37	9	6	15	82	—	—	—	—	—
2010–11	MHk 32 Liptovský Mikuláš	SVK.2	—	—	—	—	—	5	0	0	0	6
2011–12	HK 95 Považská Bystrica	SVK.2	35	5	12	17	72	—	—	—	—	—
2013–14	MHK Dubnica nad Váhom	SVK.3	12	0	1	1	8	—	—	—	—	—
SVK totals			478	53	104	157	616	9	0	1	1	12

=== International ===
Year	Team	Event	GP	G	A	Pts	PIM
1994	Slovakia	OG	8	0	1	1	12
1994	Slovakia	WC C	6	0	1	1	14
1995	Slovakia	WC B	7	3	2	5	6
1996	Slovakia	WC	5	0	0	0	6
1996	Slovakia	WCH	1	0	0	0	4
Senior totals			27	3	4	7	42
