= Cardiff Rage =

Defunct ice hockey team based in Wales

The Cardiff Rage are a defunct ice hockey team that were based in Cardiff, Wales. They played in the British National League during the 1997-98 season. The following season (98-99), they played in the English Division One (South) winning the South section before losing to Sunderland in the National semi final. The 1999-00 would see the Rage enter the English Premier League. Many of their "star" players from the previous season were recruited by Superleague and BNL teams leaving the roster very inexperienced. They tied against Oxford (who also left the EPL), but lost every other game before folding mid-season due to finances.

Some of the notable players that played for the Cardiff Rage are current GB captain Jonathan Phillips, Phil Hill, Neil Francis, plus regular EPL goalies Greg Rockman and Chris Douglas.

== Schedule And Results ==
The * indicates these games were played for 4 points.

Date	Opponent	Venue	Result	Competition
N/A	Guildford Flames	Home	Lost 18-1	Southern Premier League
N/A	Guildford Flames	Home	Lost 11-3	Southern Premier League
N/A	Guildford Flames	Away	Lost 11-1	Southern Premier League
N/A	Guildford Flames	Away	Lost 16-1	Southern Premier League
Saturday 13 December 1997	Guildford Flames	Home	Lost 14-0	Upper Deck Christmas Cup
Sunday 28 December 1997	Guildford Flames	Away	Lost 15-1	Upper Deck Christmas Cup
N/A	Kingston Hawks	Home	Lost 11-4	Upper Deck Christmas Cup
N/A	Kingston Hawks	Away	Lost 8-2	Upper Deck Christmas Cup
N/A	Peterborough Pirates	Home	Lost 14-1	Southern Premier League
N/A	Peterborough Pirates	Home	Lost 10-3	Southern Premier League
N/A	Peterborough Pirates	Away	Lost 13-2	Southern Premier League
N/A	Peterborough Pirates	Away	Lost 21-3	Southern Premier League
N/A	Slough Jets	Home	Lost 15-2	Southern Premier League
N/A	Slough Jets	Home	Lost 12-3	Southern Premier League
N/A	Slough Jets	Away	Lost 12-0	Southern Premier League
N/A	Slough Jets	Away	Lost 10-1	Southern Premier League
N/A	Slough Jets	Home	Lost 8-0	Upper Deck Christmas Cup
N/A	Slough Jets	Away	Lost 12-3	Upper Deck Christmas Cup
N/A	Solihull Blaze	Home	Won 5-3	Upper Deck Christmas Cup
N/A	Solihull Blaze	Away	Lost 15-6	Upper Deck Christmas Cup
N/A	Telford Tigers	Home	*Lost 11-2	Southern Premier League
N/A	Telford Tigers	Away	*Lost 18-0	Southern Premier League
N/A	Wightlink Raiders	Away	*Lost 5-4	Upper Deck Christmas Cup
