= Ken Priestlay =

Canadian ice hockey player (born 1967)

- Born: August 24, 1967 (age 58) Vancouver, British Columbia, Canada
- Height: 5 ft 10 in (178 cm)
- Weight: 190 lb (86 kg; 13 st 8 lb)
- Position: Centre
- Shot: Left
- Played for: Buffalo Sabres; Pittsburgh Penguins
- National team: Canada
- NHL draft: 98th overall, 1985; Buffalo Sabres
- Playing career: 1986–1999; 2002–2003

Kenneth Priestlay (born August 24, 1967) is a Canadian former ice hockey player. He played in the National Hockey League with the Buffalo Sabres and Pittsburgh Penguins between 1986 and 1992. With the Penguins, he won the Stanley Cup in 1992. Priestlay also spent several years playing in the British Hockey League and Ice Hockey Superleague before retiring in 1999, though he briefly played again in 2002–03.

== Post-hockey ==
Priestlay worked in Vancouver, BC as General Manager at Dunbar Lumber Supply, and contributes to sport radio on Sportsnet 650.

== Career statistics ==
=== Regular season and playoffs ===
			Regular season					Playoffs
Season	Team	League	GP	G	A	Pts	PIM	GP	G	A	Pts	PIM
1982–83	Esquimalt Buccaneers	BCJHL	—	—	—	—	—	—	—	—	—	—
1983–84	Victoria Cougars	WHL	55	10	18	28	31	—	—	—	—	—
1984–85	Victoria Cougars	WHL	50	25	37	62	48	—	—	—	—	—
1985–86	Victoria Cougars	WHL	72	73	72	145	45	—	—	—	—	—
1985–86	Rochester Americans	AHL	4	0	2	2	0	—	—	—	—	—
1986–87	Victoria Cougars	WHL	33	43	39	82	37	—	—	—	—	—
1986–87	Buffalo Sabres	NHL	34	11	6	17	8	—	—	—	—	—
1986–87	Rochester Americans	AHL	—	—	—	—	—	8	3	2	5	4
1987–88	Rochester Americans	AHL	43	27	24	51	47	—	—	—	—	—
1987–88	Buffalo Sabres	NHL	33	5	12	17	35	6	0	0	0	11
1988–89	Rochester Americans	AHL	64	56	37	93	60	—	—	—	—	—
1988–89	Buffalo Sabres	NHL	15	2	0	2	2	3	0	0	0	2
1989–90	Rochester Americans	AHL	40	19	39	58	46	—	—	—	—	—
1989–90	Buffalo Sabres	NHL	35	7	7	14	14	5	0	0	0	8
1990–91	Canadian National Team	Intl	40	20	26	46	34	—	—	—	—	—
1990–91	Pittsburgh Penguins	NHL	2	0	1	1	0	—	—	—	—	—
1991–92	Muskegon Lumberjacks	IHL	13	4	11	15	6	13	5	11	16	10
1991–92	Pittsburgh Penguins	NHL	49	2	8	10	4	—	—	—	—	—
1992–93	Cleveland Lumberjacks	IHL	66	33	36	69	72	4	2	1	3	4
1993–94	Kalamazoo Wings	IHL	25	9	5	14	34	5	2	1	3	2
1994–95	Sheffield Steelers	BHL	28	55	32	87	18	—	—	—	—	—
1995–96	Sheffield Steelers	BHL	36	58	40	98	28	—	—	—	—	—
1996–97	Sheffield Steelers	BISL	34	25	12	37	24	—	—	—	—	—
1997–98	Sheffield Steelers	BISL	43	19	33	52	36	—	—	—	—	—
1998–99	Sheffield Steelers	BISL	41	19	24	43	12	—	—	—	—	—
2002–03	Dundee Stars	BNL	33	31	40	71	28	—	—	—	—	—
NHL totals			168	27	34	61	63	14	0	0	0	21

Source: www.hockeydb.com

== Awards and achievements ==
- WHL West Second All-Star Team – 1986, 1987
- Stanley Cup — 1992

== Bibliography ==
An autobiography was co-written with Bob Westerdale entitled "Lord Of The Rinks", published by Breedon Books Publishing in September 1997.
