= Rocky Saganiuk =

Canadian ice hockey player

- Born: October 15, 1957 (age 68) Myrnam, Alberta, Canada
- Height: 5 ft 9 in (175 cm)
- Weight: 185 lb (84 kg; 13 st 3 lb)
- Position: Right wing
- Shot: Left
- Played for: Toronto Maple Leafs; Pittsburgh Penguins
- NHL draft: 29th overall, 1977; Toronto Maple Leafs
- WHA draft: 42nd overall, 1977; Edmonton Oilers
- Playing career: 1977–1995

Rocky Ray Saganiuk (born October 15, 1957) is a Canadian former professional ice hockey player who played 259 games in the National Hockey League (NHL) for the Toronto Maple Leafs and Pittsburgh Penguins.

== Playing career ==
Born in Myrnam, Alberta, Saganiuk played junior hockey for the Kamloops Chiefs and Lethbridge Broncos. He was drafted in 1977 by the Edmonton Oilers of the World Hockey Association (WHA) and the Toronto Maple Leafs.

Saganiuk signed with the Maple Leafs and made his professional debut in 1977 with the Dallas Black Hawks of the Central Hockey League, a farm team of the Maple Leafs. He had an outstanding season for the New Brunswick Hawks of the American Hockey League (AHL) in 1978–79, for which he won the Les Cunningham Award as the most valuable player of the 1978–79 AHL season.

He played the next three seasons in the NHL with the Toronto Maple Leafs, from 1979 to 1982, scoring 24 goals and 47 points in his best season.. Before the 1983–84 season, he was traded to the Pittsburgh Penguins. He only played one season with the Penguins, playing in only 29 games.

== Post-playing career ==
After retiring from the NHL due to injuries, Saganiuk helped develop hockey in Britain as a player-coach with both Ayr Bruins and Peterborough Pirates. He also had spells as coach of the Durham Wasps, Murrayfield Racers and Blackburn Hawks.

Saganiuk returned to North America, first as a coach in the WHL, and then as a youth hockey director in Chicago. Saganiuk is currently a youth hockey director in the Pittsburgh area, working as the Local Manager of the Pittsburgh Penguins’ Learn to Play program.

== Career statistics ==
			Regular season					Playoffs
Season	Team	League	GP	G	A	Pts	PIM	GP	G	A	Pts	PIM
1974–75	Taber Golden Suns	AJHL	50	21	32	53	124	—	—	—	—	—
1975–76	Taber Golden Suns	AJHL	49	42	32	74	169	—	—	—	—	—
1975–76	Kamloops Chiefs	WCHL	4	0	0	0	0	—	—	—	—	—
1975–76	Lethbridge Broncos	WCHL	6	2	1	3	0	5	2	1	3	6
1976–77	Lethbridge Broncos	WCHL	72	60	48	108	203	15	6	5	11	21
1977–78	Dallas Black Hawks	CHL	42	16	13	29	71	—	—	—	—	—
1978–79	Toronto Maple Leafs	NHL	16	3	5	8	9	3	1	0	1	5
1978–79	New Brunswick Hawks	AHL	61	47	29	76	91	—	—	—	—	—
1979–80	Toronto Maple Leafs	NHL	75	24	23	47	52	3	0	0	0	10
1980–81	Toronto Maple Leafs	NHL	71	12	18	30	52	—	—	—	—	—
1981–82	Toronto Maple Leafs	NHL	65	17	16	33	49	—	—	—	—	—
1982–83	Toronto Maple Leafs	NHL	3	0	0	0	2	—	—	—	—	—
1982–83	St. Catharines Saints	AHL	61	26	23	49	83	—	—	—	—	—
1983–84	Pittsburgh Penguins	NHL	29	1	3	4	37	—	—	—	—	—
1983–84	Baltimore Skipjacks	AHL	5	1	1	2	0	—	—	—	—	—
1984–85	St. Catharines Saints	AHL	4	1	1	2	11	—	—	—	—	—
1986–87	Brantford Motts Clamatos	OHA-Sr.	33	21	22	43	55	—	—	—	—	—
1987–88	Ayr Bruins	GBR	14	19	20	39	50	—	—	—	—	—
1988–89	Ayr Bruins	GBR	8	8	8	16	32	—	—	—	—	—
1991–92	Peterborough Pirates	GBR	4	6	4	10	2	—	—	—	—	—
1993–94	Murrayfield Racers	GBR	3	4	3	7	4	—	—	—	—	—
1994–95	Durham Wasps	GBR	2	1	2	3	6	—	—	—	—	—
NHL totals			259	57	65	122	201	6	1	0	1	15
AHL totals			131	75	54	129	185	—	—	—	—	—
GBR totals			31	38	37	75	94	—	—	—	—	—
