= Celtic Cup =

Celtic Cup may refer to several sports competitions featuring teams from the Celtic nations.

- Celtic Cup (netball)
- Celtic Cup (rugby union)
- Celtic Cup (2018 rugby union tournament)
- Celtic Cup (wheelchair rugby league)
- Celtic League Cup, an ice hockey league
- Celtic Cup, an underwater hockey competition
