= 1997–98 British National League season =

The 1997–98 British National League season was the second season of the British National League, the second level of ice hockey in Great Britain. 10 teams participated in the league, and the Guildford Flames won the championship.

== First round ==
=== Northern Pool ===
	Club	Pts
1.	Fife Flyers	27
2.	Paisley Pirates	23
3.	Kingston Hawks	19
4.	Murrayfield Royals	7
5.	Blackburn Hawks	5

=== Southern Pool ===
	Club	Puts
1.	Guildford Flames	28
2.	Slough Jets	18
3.	Telford Tigers	18
4.	Peterborough Pirates	17
5.	Cardiff Devils II	0

== National Pool ==
	Club	GP	W	T	L	Goals	Pts
1.	Guildford Flames	16	14	0	2	87:38	28
2.	Telford Tigers	16	11	2	3	103:58	24
3.	Kingston Hawks	16	11	0	5	93:64	22
4.	Peterborough Pirates	16	10	0	6	97:69	20
5.	Paisley Pirates	16	8	1	7	90:82	17
6.	Fife Flyers	16	8	1	7	80:75	17
7.	Slough Jets	16	6	0	10	77:67	12
8.	Blackburn Hawks	16	1	0	15	64:129	2
9.	Murrayfield Royals	16	1	0	15	43:152	2

== Playoffs ==
=== Quarterfinals ===
==== Group A ====
	Club	Pts
1.	Guildford Flames	14
2.	Kingston Hawks	13
3.	Slough Jets	9
4.	Murrayfield Royals	2
5.	Paisley Pirates	2

==== Group B ====
	Club	Pts
1.	Fife Flyers	14
2.	Telford Tigers	12
3.	Peterborough Pirates	10
4.	Blackburn Hawks	4
5.	Cardiff Devils II	0

=== Semifinals ===
- Guildford Flames - Telford Tigers 5:3
- Kingston Hawks - Fife Flyers 7:3

=== Final ===
- Kingston Hawks - Guildford Flames 1:5
