= Scottish National League =

Scottish National League may refer to nationwide competitions in Scotland in a number of sports:

- Scottish Men's National League in basketball
- Scottish National League (ice hockey), founded 1998
  - Scottish National League (1932–1954)
  - Scottish National League (1981–1982)
- Scottish National League (rugby league)
- Scottish National League (rugby union)

== See also ==
- Scots National League, a political group active from 1921 to 1928
