= Jim Lynch (ice hockey) =

Canadian ice hockey player

- Born: June 6, 1953 (age 71); Toronto, Ontario, Canada
- Played for: Fife Flyers; Murrayfield Racers; Solihull Barons; Humberside Seahawks
- Playing career: 1980–1995

Jim Lynch (born June 6, 1953) is a Canadian retired professional ice hockey player and coach who played for Fife Flyers, Murrayfield Racers, Solihull Barons, Humberside Seahawks and coached Ayr Scottish Eagles in the United Kingdom.

He was inducted to the British Ice Hockey Hall of Fame in 2001.

== Career statistics ==
Player

Season	Team	League
1980-81	Fife Flyers	BHL
1983-84	Murrayfield Racers	BHL
1984-85	Murrayfield Racers	BHL
1985-86	Murrayfield Racers	BHL
1986-87	Kirkcaldy Kestrels	BHL
1987-88	Fife Flyers	BHL
1988-89	Fife Flyers	BHL
1989-90	Solihull Barons	BHL
1990-91	Humberside Seahawks	BHL
1991-92	Humberside Seahawks	BHL
1993-94	Fife Flyers	BHL
1994-95	Solihull Barons	BHL

== Grand Slam ==
Jim Lynch was coach of the grand slam winning Ayr Scottish Eagles Icehockey club in the 1997-1998 season where they went on to win all four major UK ice hockey trophies. These were:

- British Championship
- Ice Hockey Superleague
- Benson and Hedges Cup
- Express Cup

== See also ==
- Ayr Scottish Eagles
