= Lawrence Lovell =

Scottish ice hockey player

- Born: 14 August 1944 (age 82) Edinburgh, Scotland
- Position: Forward
- Played for: Fife Flyers; Murrayfield Racers
- Playing career: 1963–1984

Lawrence "Lawrie" Lovell (born 14 August 1944 in Edinburgh, Scotland) is a retired professional ice hockey player and coach who played for the Fife Flyers and Murrayfield Racers in the United Kingdom. Lovell also played for the Great Britain national ice hockey team at five senior world championships.

After retiring from play in 1984 Lovell took on a coaching role with the GB under-19 team. He retired from coaching in 1991.

He was inducted to the British Ice Hockey Hall of Fame in 1992.
