= Tom Coolen =

Canadian professional ice hockey coach

Tom Coolen (born November 20, 1953, in Halifax, Nova Scotia) is a Canadian professional ice hockey coach. He was most recently the head coach of Fife Flyers in the UK's Elite Ice Hockey League (EIHL), and a former assistant coach for the Polish men's national team.

He is a two time winner of the CIS Coach of the Year award, and a three time AUS Coach of the Year recipient. He built two National Championship teams at Acadia University and 5 AUS champions at Acadia and the University of New Brunswick. At the 2014 Sochi Winter Olympics, Coolen served as assistant coach to Ted Nolan.

He began his coaching career at the Canadian university level, first as an assistant coach for the UNB Varsity Reds and later as head coach for the Acadia Axemen. He then continued his career coaching in various European leagues, including the German DEL and DEL2, Italian Serie A, Swiss NLA, Austrian EBEL, Danish Metal Ligaen, and Finnish Liiga.

From 2012-2015, he served as an assistant coach for the Latvian national team. From 2014 to 2015, he was also an assistant coach for the Buffalo Sabres under head coach Ted Nolan.
