= Gordon Latto (ice hockey) =

Gordon John Latto (born 18 December 1958) is a former professional ice hockey player who played in the British Hockey League for the Fife Flyers between 1972 and 1998. He also played for the Great Britain national ice hockey team 1976 and 1989. He was inducted to the British Ice Hockey Hall of Fame in 1999.

Latto was born in Kirkcaldy, Fife. He is the Fife Flyers longest serving player, he started playing with Fife Flyers in 1972, and retired in 1998, recording 974 games with a points total of 1265pts.
