= Floyd Snider =

Canadian ice hockey player

- Born: c. 1924 Kingston, Ontario, Canada
- Died: 12 February 1976
- Position: Defence
- Played for: Fife Flyers
- Playing career: 1946–1954

Floyd Snider (ca. 1924 – 12 February 1976) was a former Canadian ice hockey player. He played between 1946 and 1954 for the Fife Flyers in the Scottish National League. He was inducted to the British Ice Hockey Hall of Fame in 1951.
