= Garet Hunt =

Canadian ice hockey player

- Born: October 14, 1987 (age 39) Maple Ridge, British Columbia, Canada
- Height: 5 ft 8 in (173 cm)
- Weight: 187 lb (85 kg; 13 st 5 lb)
- Position: Left wing
- Shoots: Left
- EIHL team Former teams: Fife Flyers; Springfield Falcons; Worcester Sharks; ASC Corona Brasov; Kunlun Red Star; South Carolina Stingrays
- NHL draft: Undrafted
- Playing career: 2008–present

Garet Hunt (born October 14, 1987) is a Canadian professional ice hockey winger currently under contract with the Fife Flyers of the EIHL in the UK.

Hunt previously played with ASC Corona Brasov in the Erste Liga and Kunlun Red Star in the Kontinental Hockey League (KHL). He was previously a stalwart with former ECHL club, the Stockton Thunder. He is best known for his agitating playing style.

== Playing career ==
Hunt began his junior career with the Chilliwack Chiefs of the British Columbia Hockey League (BCHL). In 2004–05, he joined the Vancouver Giants of the major junior Western Hockey League (WHL). He would go on to play four seasons with the Giants and establish himself as an effective agitator, while helping the club to the 2006 President's Cup championship as WHL champions and the 2007 Memorial Cup championship as Canadian major junior champions (although Hunt missed the entirety of the 2007 playoffs due to a broken leg). In his final year of junior in 2007–08, he recorded WHL career-highs with 18 points and 239 penalty minutes in addition to a league-high 27 fighting majors.

Undrafted at the end of his junior career, Hunt signed a minor league contract with the Edmonton Oilers of the National Hockey League (NHL) affiliate, the Springfield Falcons of the American Hockey League (AHL). Hunt was then assigned to the Stockton Thunder of the ECHL for his professional rookie season in 2008–09. During his rookie season with the Thunder, Hunt played 69 games and contributed 16 points (5 goals and 11 assists). He also finished second in the ECHL with 248 penalty minutes.

After remaining in Stockton upon the Thunder relocating to Adirondack, Hunt earned a try-out contract to attend the newly installed AHL franchise, the Stockton Heat training camp. Upon his release from the Heat, Hunt signed for just his second ECHL club, in the Alaska Aces on November 4, 2015. Hunt's number was later retired by the Stockton Thunder and upon leaving the ECHL after 11 seasons, he was the most penalized player in history with 2666 PIM in 702 games.

On July 4, 2019, Hunt was signed by Chinese club, HC Kunlun Red Star of the KHL, to a two-year contract. Reconnecting with his Chinese origin, Hunt would be eligible to play for China at the 2022 Beijing Olympics.

Hunt signed with the Wheeling Nailers of the ECHL on March 8, 2021. In 7 appearances with the Nailers, Hunt added 0 points and 69 penalty minutes.

As a free agent, Hunt extended his career in Europe, agreeing to a contract with Romanian club ASC Corona Brasov of the Erste Liga on August 11, 2021.

On November 28, 2021 against Csíkszereda, he received multiple penalties stemming from a fight, namely 5 minutes for fighting and a 20 minute game misconduct. He received an additional 20 minutes for abuse of officials for throwing a trash can onto the ice towards the linesmen. This resulted in a nine game suspension.

After a season in Romania, in July 2022 Hunt initially signed for the Nottingham Panthers of the Elite Ice Hockey League for the 2022–23 season. However, in August 2022 it was announced he would not be joining Nottingham after instead being offered a contract in the KHL. Hunt instead returned to the KHL with HC Kunlun Red Star.

On October 5, 2023, Hunt returned to North America and the ECHL in signing a contract with the South Carolina Stingrays for the 2023–24 season.

== Career statistics ==
			Regular season					Playoffs
Season	Team	League	GP	G	A	Pts	PIM	GP	G	A	Pts	PIM
2003–04	Chilliwack Chiefs	BCHL	55	6	5	11	203	11	0	1	1	4
2004–05	Vancouver Giants	WHL	23	1	2	3	44	1	0	0	0	2
2005–06	Vancouver Giants	WHL	51	2	7	9	103	18	1	0	1	17
2006–07	Vancouver Giants	WHL	57	6	5	11	156	—	—	—	—	—
2007–08	Vancouver Giants	WHL	62	7	11	18	239	10	0	1	1	6
2008–09	Stockton Thunder	ECHL	63	5	11	16	248	13	3	0	3	22
2008–09	Springfield Falcons	AHL	1	0	0	0	2	—	—	—	—	—
2009–10	Stockton Thunder	ECHL	52	5	7	12	215	13	3	2	5	8
2010–11	Worcester Sharks	AHL	9	0	1	1	35	—	—	—	—	—
2010–11	Stockton Thunder	ECHL	60	13	17	30	248	4	0	1	1	4
2011–12	Stockton Thunder	ECHL	69	7	12	19	255	8	1	0	1	14
2012–13	Stockton Thunder	ECHL	70	7	18	25	235	23	3	10	13	25
2013–14	Stockton Thunder	ECHL	69	14	22	36	187	7	1	1	2	31
2014–15	Stockton Thunder	ECHL	58	13	8	21	269	—	—	—	—	—
2015–16	Alaska Aces	ECHL	61	11	12	23	277	—	—	—	—	—
2016–17	Alaska Aces	ECHL	63	4	12	16	243	—	—	—	—	—
2017–18	Jacksonville Icemen	ECHL	68	14	9	23	221	—	—	—	—	—
2018–19	Jacksonville Icemen	ECHL	69	9	14	23	268	2	0	0	0	20
2019–20	Kunlun Red Star	KHL	28	0	1	1	63	—	—	—	—	—
2020–21	Wheeling Nailers	ECHL	7	1	2	3	21	—	—	—	—	—
2021–22	ASC Corona Brasov	Erste Liga	21	9	15	24	79	3	0	1	1	21
2021–22	ASC Corona Brașov	Romania	18	12	13	25	73	—	—	—	—	—
2022–23	Kunlun Red Star	KHL	40	1	1	2	95	—	—	—	—	—
ECHL totals			709	103	144	247	2687	70	11	14	25	124
AHL totals			10	0	1	1	37	—	—	—	—	—
KHL totals			68	1	2	3	158	—	—	—	—	—
