= 1998–99 British National League season =

The 1998–99 British National League season was the third season of the British National League, the second level of ice hockey in Great Britain. Nine teams participated in the league, and the Fife Flyers won the championship.

== First round ==
	Club	GP	W	OTW	OTL	L	Goals	Pts
1.	Slough Jets	32	23	0	2	7	137:78	48
2.	Basingstoke Bison	32	20	2	2	8	148:109	46
3.	Guildford Flames	32	20	1	1	10	152:104	43
4.	Peterborough Pirates	32	18	2	2	11	152:122	40
5.	Fife Flyers	32	13	2	1	16	121:126	31
6.	Kingston Hawks	32	12	2	1	17	113:127	29
7.	Telford Tigers	32	11	3	1	17	141:160	29
8.	Edinburgh Capitals	32	9	0	3	20	112:185	21
9.	Paisley Pirates	32	4	3	1	24	91:156	15

== Playoffs ==
=== Group A ===
	Club	GP	W	OTW	OTL	L	Goals	Pts
1.	Slough Jets	6	5	1	0	0	28:12	12
2.	Fife Flyers	6	3	0	1	2	29:24	7
3.	Peterborough Pirates	6	2	0	0	4	21:28	4
4.	Edinburgh Capitals	6	1	0	0	5	22:36	2

=== Group B ===
	Club	GP	W	OTW	OTL	L	Goals	Pts
1.	Guildford Flames	6	4	1	1	0	34:16	11
2.	Basingstoke Bison	6	4	1	0	1	36:13	10
3.	Kingston Hawks	6	1	1	1	3	23:32	5
4.	Telford Tigers	6	0	0	1	5	25:57	1

=== Semifinals ===
- Slough Jets - Basingstoke Bison 3:1
- Guildford Flames - Fife Flyers 3:4

=== Final ===
- Slough Jets - Fife Flyers 5:6 SO
