= 2000–01 British National League season =

The 2000–01 British National League season was the fifth season of the British National League, the second level of ice hockey in Great Britain. 10 teams participated in the league, and the Guildford Flames won the championship.

== Regular season ==
	Club	GP	W	OTW	OTL	L	Goals	Pts
1.	Guildford Flames	36	27	1	3	5	180:84	59
2.	Basingstoke Bison	36	23	4	2	7	154:104	56
3.	Fife Flyers	36	25	1	3	7	209:96	55
4.	Coventry Blaze	36	24	2	1	9	215:111	53
5.	Peterborough Pirates	36	20	3	1	12	170:129	47
6.	Hull Thunder	36	16	2	1	17	156:147	37
7.	Slough Jets	36	11	2	3	20	121:150	29
8.	Milton Keynes Kings	36	10	1	0	25	153:170	22
9.	Edinburgh Capitals	36	6	0	3	27	130:246	15
10.	Paisley Pirates	36	1	1	0	34	71:322	4

== Playoffs ==
=== Group A ===
	Club	GP	W	OTW	OTL	L	Goals	Pts
1.	Guildford Flames	6	5	0	1	0	25:11	11
2.	Peterborough Pirates	6	1	3	0	2	21:22	8
3.	Coventry Blaze	6	3	0	1	2	23:21	7
4.	Milton Keynes Kings	6	0	0	1	5	11:26	1

=== Group B ===
	Club	GP	W	OTW	OTL	L	Goals	Pts
1.	Basingstoke Bison	6	3	2	0	1	19:13	10
2.	Slough Jets	6	3	1	2	0	17:12	10
3.	Fife Flyers	6	3	0	1	2	20:15	7
4.	Hull Thunder	6	0	0	0	6	14:30	0

=== Semifinals ===
- Guildford Flames - Slough Jets 5:2, 5:2
- Peterborough Pirates - Basingstoke Bison 2:2, 1:3

=== Final ===
- Guildford Flames - Basingstoke Bison 7:2, 5:2
