= 2001–02 British National League season =

The 2001–02 British National League season was the sixth season of the British National League, the second level of ice hockey in Great Britain. 12 teams participated in the league, and the Dundee Stars won the championship.

== Regular season ==
	Club	GP	W	T	L	Goals	Pts
1.	Dundee Stars	44	40	0	4	289:101	80
2.	Coventry Blaze	44	33	2	9	227:118	68
3.	Fife Flyers	44	31	1	12	222:110	63
4.	Basingstoke Bison	44	24	2	18	201:151	50
5.	Guildford Flames	44	24	1	19	198:144	49
6.	Hull Thunder	44	23	2	19	190:161	48
7.	Edinburgh Capitals	44	20	1	23	180:212	41
8.	Milton Keynes Kings	44	17	4	23	146:160	38
9.	Paisley Pirates	44	18	1	25	161:259	37
10.	Peterborough Pirates	44	11	3	30	136:208	25
11.	Slough Jets	44	7	4	33	112:216	18
12.	Cardiff Devils	44	5	1	38	90:312	11

== Playoffs ==
=== Group 1 ===
	Club	GP	W	T	L	Goals	Pts
1.	Dundee Stars	6	6	0	0	24:5	12
2.	Guildford Flames	6	3	0	3	13:13	6
3.	Basingstoke Bison	6	2	1	3	13:19	5
4.	Milton Keynes Kings	6	0	1	5	8:21	1

=== Group 2 ===
	Club	GP	W	T	L	Goals	Pts
1.	Coventry Blaze	6	5	0	1	34:9	10
2.	Fife Flyers	6	4	1	1	24:20	10
3.	Hull Thunder	6	1	1	4	18:33	2
4.	Edinburgh Capitals	6	1	0	5	15:29	2

=== Semifinals ===
- Coventry Blaze - Guildford Flames 6:3, 4:1
- Dundee Stars - Fife Flyers 5:2, 5:1

=== Final ===
- Dundee Stars - Coventry Blaze 7:4, 1:3
