= Scottish National League (1981–82) =

The Scottish National League was an ice hockey league in Scotland that existed only for the 1981–82 season. It was the first national league contested in Scotland since the old Scottish National League was held in 1954. The five Scottish teams from the Northern League participated in the league. The Dundee Rockets won the championship.

== Regular season ==
	Club	GP	W	T	L	GF	GA	Pts
1.	Dundee Rockets	8	6	1	1	94	41	13
2.	Murrayfield Racers	8	5	2	1	64	42	12
3.	Fife Flyers	8	3	1	4	60	63	7
4.	Glasgow Dynamos	8	2	2	4	46	70	6
5.	Ayr Bruins	8	1	0	7	37	85	2
