= Celtic League Cup =

Ice hockey league

The Celtic League Cup was an ice hockey league contested by teams from both Scotland and Ireland. It was introduced in for the 2008/09 season with the purpose of raising the profile of the sport in Ireland and increasing interest in Scotland. Its teams also played in the Northern Premier League or the Irish Hockey League.

== Teams ==
- (Scotland) Dundee Stars
- (Scotland) Fife Flyers
- (Scotland) Paisley Pirates
- (Scotland) Solway Sharks

== Champions ==
- 2009: Fife Flyers
- 2010: Fife Flyers
