= 2002–03 British National League season =

The 2002–03 British National League season was the seventh season of the British National League, the second level of ice hockey in Great Britain. 10 teams participated in the league, and the Coventry Blaze won the championship.

== Regular season ==
	Club	GP	W	T	OTL	L	Goals	Pts
1.	Coventry Blaze	36	30	1	1	4	173:69	62
2.	Dundee Stars	36	27	0	1	8	196:109	55
3.	Guildford Flames	36	22	0	0	14	168:133	44
4.	Basingstoke Bison	36	20	1	1	14	128:119	42
5.	Cardiff Devils	36	20	0	1	15	133:104	41
6.	Edinburgh Capitals	36	19	0	2	15	119:125	40
7.	Fife Flyers	36	15	0	3	18	113:127	33
8.	Newcastle Vipers	36	12	2	0	22	115:155	26
9.	Hull Thunder	36	8	0	0	28	110:236	16
10.	Solihull Blaze	36	4	2	3	27	72:150	13

== Playoffs ==
=== Group A ===
	Club	GP	W	T	L	Goals	Pts
1.	Coventry Blaze	6	6	0	0	18:6	12
2.	Cardiff Devils	6	4	0	2	17:9	8
3.	Basingstoke Bison	6	1	0	5	14:23	2
4.	Newcastle Vipers	6	1	0	5	9:20	2

=== Group B ===
	Club	GP	W	T	L	Goals	Pts
1.	Dundee Stars	6	5	0	1	28:14	10
2.	Guildford Flames	6	4	0	2	25:15	10
3.	Edinburgh Capitals	6	2	0	4	14:23	2
4.	Fife Flyers	6	1	0	5	16:31	2

=== Semifinals ===
- Coventry Blaze - Guildford Flames 4:2, 5:1
- Cardiff Devils - Dundee Stars 5:3, 3:4 OT

=== Final ===
- Coventry Blaze - Cardiff Devils 3:2, 2:1
