= 1999–2000 British National League season =

The 1999–2000 British National League season was the fourth season of the British National League, the second level of ice hockey in Great Britain. 10 teams participated in the league, and the Fife Flyers won the championship.

== Regular season ==
	Club	GP	W	OTW	OTL	L	Goals	Pts
1.	Fife Flyers	36	28	1	0	7	176:89	58
2.	Guildford Flames	36	26	1	2	7	185:99	56
3.	Basingstoke Bison	36	22	3	0	11	139:85	50
4.	Hull Thunder	36	20	3	1	12	149:132	47
5.	Peterborough Pirates	36	22	1	0	13	171:128	46
6.	Slough Jets	36	19	0	3	14	109:100	41
7.	Solihull Blaze	36	13	1	2	20	161:172	30
8.	Edinburgh Capitals	36	9	1	1	25	118:192	21
9.	Milton Keynes Kings	36	4	1	1	30	114:202	11
10.	Paisley Pirates	36	4	1	1	30	103:226	11

== Playoffs ==
=== Group A ===
	Club	Pts
1.	Fife Flyers	10
2.	Peterborough Pirates	7
3.	Hull Thunder	6
4.	Edinburgh Capitals	2

=== Group B ===
	Club	Pts
1.	Basingstoke Bison	8
2.	Solihull Blaze	8
3.	Guildford Flames	8
4.	Slough Jets	2

=== Semifinals ===
- Fife Flyers - Solihull Blaze 2:0 (5:2, 5:4)
- Basingstoke Bison - Peterborough Pirates 2:0 (6:3, 4:2)

=== Final ===
- Fife Flyers - Basingstoke Bison 3:0 (6:3, 2:1, 2:1)
