= 2004–05 British National League season =

The 2004–05 British National League season was the ninth and final season of the British National League, the second level of ice hockey in Great Britain. Seven teams participated in the league, and the Dundee Stars won the championship.

== Regular season ==
	Club	GP	W	T	OTL	L	Goals	Pts
1.	Bracknell Bees	38	24	2	2	10	154:89	52
2.	Newcastle Vipers	38	18	1	2	17	123:139	39
3.	Guildford Flames	38	16	2	2	18	113:112	36
4.	Hull Stingrays	38	16	1	2	19	96:121	35
5.	Dundee Stars	38	14	0	0	24	117:155	28
6.	Fife Flyers	38	12	0	1	25	112:171	25
7.	Edinburgh Capitals	38	6	1	2	29	102:189	15

== Playoffs ==
=== First round ===
	Club	GP	W	OTW	T	OTL	L	Goals	Pts
1.	Bracknell Bees	10	6	0	2	0	2	35:23	14
2.	Guildford Flames	10	6	1	0	0	3	30:20	14
3.	Fife Flyers	10	4	2	0	1	3	34:33	13
4.	Dundee Stars	10	3	1	1	1	4	36:36	10
5.	Newcastle Vipers	10	3	0	1	0	6	27:35	7
6.	Hull Stingrays	10	2	0	0	2	6	21:36	6

=== Semifinals ===
- Dundee Stars - Bracknell Bees 3:3 (2:1 SO), 5:5 (1:0 SO)
- Guildford Flames - Fife Flyers 1:3, 3:1, 6:3

=== Final ===
- Dundee Stars - Guildford Flames 4:0, 5:2, 3:2
