= 1993–94 BHL season =

- Sport: ice hockey

Seasons
- ← 1992–93 1994–95 →

The 1993–94 BHL season was the 12th season of the British Hockey League, the top level of ice hockey in Great Britain. 12 teams participated in the league, and the Cardiff Devils won the league title by finishing first in the regular season. They also won the playoff championship.

== Regular season ==
Team	GP	W	T	L	GF	GA	Pts
Cardiff Devils	44	39	0	5	422	220	78
Fife Flyers	44	27	2	15	304	192	56
Sheffield Steelers	44	28	4	12	313	198	55
Nottingham Panthers	44	26	2	16	288	224	54
Murrayfield Racers	44	26	2	16	288	224	54
Durham Wasps	44	24	2	18	316	284	50
Whitley Warriors	44	23	4	17	282	298	50
Humberside Hawks	44	18	4	22	301	308	40
Basingstoke Beavers	44	11	6	27	255	344	28
Bracknell Bees	44	11	3	30	220	320	25
Peterborough Pirates	44	9	3	32	238	398	21
Teesside Bombers	44	5	0	39	238	491	10

== Playoffs ==
=== Group A ===
Group A	GP	W	T	L	GF	GA	Pts
Cardiff Devils	6	5	1	0	53	30	11
Nottingham Panthers	6	2	1	3	27	39	5
Whitley Warriors	6	1	2	3	35	33	4
Durham Wasps	6	1	2	3	25	37	4

=== Group B ===
Group B	GP	W	T	L	GF	GA	Pts
Sheffield Steelers	6	5	0	1	45	28	10
Fife Flyers	6	3	1	2	36	28	7
Murrayfield Racers	6	2	0	4	44	41	4
Humberside Seahawks	6	1	1	4	26	49	3

=== Semifinals ===
- Cardiff Devils 9-5 Fife Flyers
- Sheffield Steelers 8-0 Nottingham Panthers

=== Final ===
- Cardiff Devils 12-1 Sheffield Steelers

Preceded by 1992–93 BHL season	BHL seasons	Succeeded by 1994–95 BHL season
