= 1994–95 BHL season =

- Sport: ice hockey

Seasons
- ← 1993–94 1995–96 →

The 1994–95 BHL season was the 13th season of the British Hockey League, the top level of ice hockey in Great Britain. 12 teams participated in the league, and the Sheffield Steelers won the league title by finishing first in the regular season. They also won the playoff championship.

== Regular season ==
Team	GP	W	T	L	GF	GA	Pts
Sheffield Steelers	44	35	4	5	334	183	74
Nottingham Panthers	44	32	4	8	372	213	68
Cardiff Devils	44	32	4	8	366	217	68
Edinburgh Racers	44	25	5	14	335	289	55
Durham Wasps	44	22	3	19	264	242	47
Fife Flyers	44	20	4	20	271	242	44
Basingstoke Beavers	44	20	2	22	271	279	42
Humberside Hawks	44	17	6	21	331	330	40
Peterborough Pirates	44	12	5	27	248	368	29
Whitley Warriors	44	10	4	30	242	372	24
Milton Keynes Kings	44	9	4	31	248	363	22
Bracknell Bees	44	6	3	35	189	373	15

== Playoffs ==
=== Group A ===
Group A	GP	W	T	L	GF	GA	Pts
Sheffield Steelers	6	4	0	2	35	24	8
Nottingham Panthers	6	3	0	3	36	25	6
Fife Flyers	6	3	0	3	29	37	6
Humberside Hawks	6	2	0	4	28	42	4

=== Group B ===
Group B	GP	W	T	L	GF	GA	Pts
Edinburgh Racers	6	4	1	1	42	37	9
Cardiff Devils	6	3	2	1	46	30	8
Basingstoke Beavers	6	2	1	3	33	38	5
Durham Wasps	6	0	2	4	23	39	2

=== Semifinals ===
- Sheffield Steelers 7-5 (SO) Cardiff Devils
- Edinburgh Racers 11-7 Nottingham Panthers

=== Final ===
- Sheffield Steelers 7-2 Edinburgh Racers

Preceded by 1993–94 BHL season	BHL seasons	Succeeded by 1995–96 BHL season
