= 2003–04 British National League season =

The 2003–04 British National League season was the eighth season of the British National League, the second level of ice hockey in Great Britain. Seven teams participated in the league, and the Guildford Flames won the championship.

== Regular season ==
	Club	GP	W	OTW	T	OTL	L	Goals	Pts
1.	Fife Flyers	36	21	2	3	3	7	135:97	52
2.	Guildford Flames	36	20	4	0	3	9	136:88	51
3.	Edinburgh Capitals	36	16	3	2	2	13	143:117	42
4.	Bracknell Bees	36	11	5	6	1	13	116:103	39
5.	Newcastle Vipers	36	14	3	1	2	16	109:135	37
6.	Dundee Stars	36	13	1	3	4	15	112:140	35
7.	Hull Stingrays	36	3	1	3	4	25	71:142	15

== Playoffs ==
=== First round ===
	Club	GP	W	T	L	Goals	Pts
1.	Guildford Flames	10	6	2	2	33:16	14
2.	Fife Flyers	10	6	1	3	31:22	13
3.	Bracknell Bees	10	5	1	4	28:25	11
4.	Edinburgh Capitals	10	4	1	5	31:42	9
5.	Newcastle Vipers	10	3	1	6	21:31	7
6.	Dundee Stars	10	2	2	6	29:37	6

=== Semifinals ===
- Guildford Flames - Edinburgh Capitals 6:2, 4:3
- Bracknell Bees - Fife Flyers 2:1, 3:2

=== Final ===
- Guildford Flames - Bracknell Bees 5:4, 4:3
