= Fife Flyers =

Scottish ice hockey team

- City: Kirkcaldy, Scotland
- League: Elite Ice Hockey League
- Founded: 1938
- Home arena: Fife Ice Arena (capacity: 3,525)
- Colours: Blue, gold, white
- Owner: Fife Flyers 2025 Limited
- General manager: Tim Wallace
- Head coach: Tim Wallace
- Captain: Garet Hunt
- Affiliates: Solway Sharks, NIHL; Kirkcaldy Kestrels, SNL

The Fife Flyers are a Scottish professional ice hockey team in Kirkcaldy, Fife. Established in 1938, the Flyers are the oldest still-extant club in the country. The Flyers play their home games at Fife Ice Arena, which has a capacity of 3,525.

They joined the EIHL in 2011. They are currently coached by the American Tim Wallace.

== History ==
=== Early years (1938–1980) ===
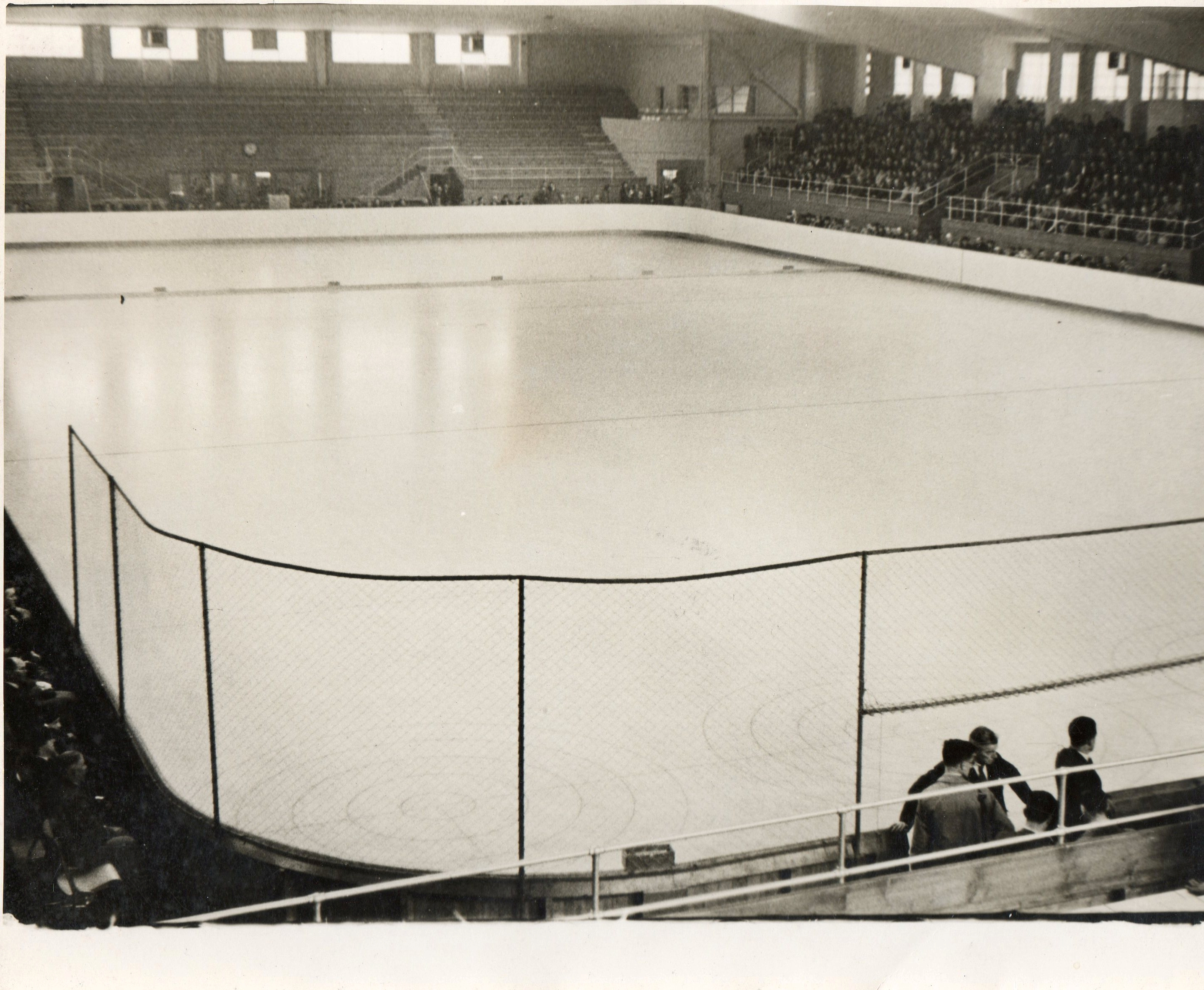
Kirkcaldy Ice Rink, seen c. 1938. Fife Flyers have played here for their entire history.

Fife Flyers' first game was on 1 October 1938 versus Dundee Tigers, with the first goal scored by Norman McQuade and the first club captain being Les Lovell Snr.

The Flyers won the Scottish element of the Autumn Cup for the first time in 1948, felling Falkirk Lions in the Final. They were runners-up in their attempt to defend the title in a year where they also won the Scottish National League (SNL) for the first time. Fife won the Scottish Autumn Cup back in 1950, this time against the Ayr Raiders, which formed a Double as they retained the SNL title. In 1954 Fife joined the British National League, and in its maiden campaign finished ninth in the eleven-strong division. The League was reduced from eleven to five after all but one–the Paisley Pirates–of the Scottish contingent pulled out.

In 1972 Fife won the Northern Autumn Cup–reconstituted as a regional tournament in 1967–before lifting it three more times that decade. They would also achieve success in league action, winning the Northern League two seasons running. The Flyers also played in the one-season Scottish National League in 1981–82, finishing third.

=== British Hockey League years (1982–1996) ===
Fife joined the new British Hockey League (BHL) in 1982. In the 1984–85 BHL season, the Flyers won the Scottish section of the now-national Autumn Cup, before losing the Final at Streatham Ice Rink against Durham Wasps. The Wasps also pipped Fife to the regular season championship, but the playoffs were won by Fife, who beat fellow Scots the Murrayfield Racers in the final. The Racers' revenge came in the playoff semi-finals the following season. Fife Flyers were beaten Autumn Cup finalists again in 1986–87, losing to the Nottingham Panthers at the National Exhibition Centre, and there was no silverware in the playoffs either as Durham Wasps defeated Fife, as they did in the following season. The 1988–89 BHL season saw Fife Flyers fail to graduate from their playoff group, sparking a barren run which would take in semi-final defeat to Welsh club Cardiff Devils in 1989–90, a finish of dead last the year after, and a season outside the top-flight; reaching the BHL final four for the final time in the 1993–94 BHL season.

The final BHL season was 1995–96, after which time the Ice Hockey Superleague became the new top British league.

=== Back in the British National League (1996–2005) ===
The original analogue hockey clock. Since replacement, this clock has been kept in storage.

The Flyers joined the new second tier British National League (BNL) in 1996. The BNL featured a Premier League and a Northern Premier League in the début season. Fife finished top of the Northern Premier League's first round, before winning the playoffs. They lost the Inter-League Final to the Swindon IceLords, however Ice Hockey Journalists UK (IHJUK) awarded both the Coach of the Year Trophy and Player of the Year Trophy to Mark Morrison. The second season saw the conferences of five teams renamed to Northern and Southern Pools, and again Fife came top of their region. In the National Pool they finished sixth out of nine (the Cardiff Devils' second side were excluded from the National Pool), with all ten teams in the end-of-season events. Having won Group B to be Scotland's only survivors, the Flyers were downed in the semi-finals by Hullite club Kingston Hawks.

The BNL did away with regional conferences for 1998–99, and Fife Flyers finished fifth in the first round, with Slough Jets top of the nine-strong league. With only bottom club Paisley Pirates failing to make the playoffs, both the Flyers and the Jets qualified from Group A, and both won their semi-final (against Guildford Flames and Basingstoke Bison respectively) to face each other in the Final, which was won by the Scottish club, giving them their first BNL title. Defending their title in 1999–2000, the Flyers finished first both in the regular season and their playoff group before winning the semi-final, and the Final itself, against Basingstoke Bison.

Searching for a three-peat in 2000–01, the Flyers delivered their worst BNL performance yet, failing to reach the semi-finals for the first time at this level. Flyers posted a semi-final finish in three of the following four campaigns: beaten by Dundee Stars in 2001–02, by the Bracknell Bees in 2003–04 and in 2004–05 (the last BNL season), the Flyers fell to the Flames, after only last-placed Edinburgh Capitals failed to qualify for the playoffs.

After the Edinburgh Capitals and Newcastle Vipers joined the top-flight Elite Ice Hockey League (the Superleague having ceased operations in 2003), the BNL folded, with all the former BNL clubs joining other leagues.

=== Silverware in Scotland: British, Caledonian, and Celtic competitions (2005–2011) ===
The newer electronic clock and scoreboard, introduced in the early 21st century

The Flyers' next destinations were the resurrected Northern League and the third iteration of the SNL. They were very successful in their first season at these levels, winning both Leagues, their respective playoffs, the Scottish Cup, and the Scottish Autumn Cup. These comprised a Grand Slam. The following season, the John Brady Bowl–awarded to Northern League playoff champions–was the only trophy to have eluded them.

Leaving the SNL but remaining in the Northern League, Fife were founder members of the five-team Scottish Premier Hockey League in 2007. They extended their dominance to this new division; since Fife Flyers entry in to the Scottish Premier, they have won 11 out of 12 trophies while recording a new club record of 47 consecutive wins and a 50-game unbeaten run, from September 2006 to April 2007, while again winning the regular season and the playoffs in both set-ups. Flyers entered the Celtic League Cup for its inaugural competition in 2008–09, a league composed of six clubs, two from Ireland and four from Scotland. They finished top of the league, and won the four-team playoffs, as well as winning the Northern League, Scottish Cup, and Scottish Autumn Cup. A more modest season was to follow as their haul in 2009–10 featured the Scottish Cup and the final Celtic League Cup, before their final season in the Northern League ended with Fife first.

=== Flying high: Fife in the Elite League (2011–present) ===
In late June 2011, the Fife Flyers were accepted into the EIHL, replacing the Newcastle Vipers for the 2011–12 season. The Flyers found the going tough in their first season back in Britain's top flight ice hockey league, finishing in last place and missing the play-offs entirely. With a year of top-flight experience, the Flyers' second season (2012–13) was moderately more successful. The team, led by key players Casey Haines, Derek Keller, and Bryan Pitton, won at home, but struggled to win games away from Kirkcaldy. They finished seventh in the league, resulting in an eighth position seeding for the play-offs (Hull Stingrays, despite finishing 8th in the league, had won their conference and were consequently seeded second overall as conference winners). Fife played Nottingham Panthers over two hotly contested legs, winning 4–2 at home before losing 3–0 in Nottingham and being eliminated from the play-offs.

In the 2013–14 season, a squad overhaul meant that only two foreign players, Bobby Chaumount and Danny Stewart, returned from the previous year. After a poor start to the season continued through the winter, changes were made in February, and an ensuing successful run saw them qualify for the play-offs in the last game of the season. They defeated the Gardiner Conference champion Dundee Stars 8–4 on aggregate and made the final four play-off finals in Nottingham. Their semi-final game against the league winning Belfast Giants was hotly contested, but the Giants emerged 1-0 winners.

While many players from the semi-final team returned for the 2014–15 season, the team saw mixed results. The Flyers qualified for the quarter-finals of the Challenge Cup and for the play-offs, but did not progress to the finals. With only Danny Stewart and Kyle Haines returning as foreign players for 2015–16, the squad underwent a major overhaul. The Flyers finished 6th in the league and 2nd in their conference, losing to Braehead Clan on equal points. Fife drew the Clan in the quarter-finals and won a close victory (2-1 at home, 2–2 away after overtime). Their semi-final game against Nottingham Panthers was less successful, with Fife losing by a score of 4–1.

Fife Flyers won the Gardiner Conference for the 2017–18 season with an away win over Dundee Stars securing the title. In the 2017–18 season they finished 7th. Fife Flyers were among the early pacesetters in the race for the 2018–19 title, after their positive start to the season, but they finished in 6th in the standings.

The 2019–20 season proved to be their worst on-ice performance since their inaugural season in the league in 2011–12, with the Flyers bottom of the table in 10th at the time of the league's cancellation, due to the coronavirus pandemic, in March 2020.

In July 2021, the Flyers confirmed their intention to return to Elite League action for the 2021–22 season, following the cancellation of the 2020–21 campaign. The club also confirmed the return behind the bench of head coach Todd Dutiaume and assistant coach Jeff Hutchins.

The 2021–22 Elite League campaign resulted in a finish bottom of the standings (10th) and saw Fife miss the play-offs by 14 points. In June 2022, the Flyers once again announced the return of head coach Todd Dutiaume, who also took on General Manager responsibilities. Assistant coach Jeff Hutchins was named an associate coach with a greater say in the day-to-day running of the team.

On 15 February 2023, Fife reached the final of the Challenge Cup for the very first time, with a 7-6 aggregate win (after the shootout) against the Sheffield Steelers. The final saw Fife take on the Belfast Giants. However, the Flyers would lose 9–3 at a sold out SSE Arena on 1 March to the hosts Belfast, who claimed their fourth Challenge Cup title in five seasons.

However, in the league in the 2022–23 season, Fife finished in 9th on 34 points from 54 games (14-34-6) and missed out on the play-offs by just one point to Glasgow Clan, who took the 8th and final spot.

==== Departure of Dutiaume and Hutchins ====
Major change came to the Flyers ahead of the 2023–24 EIHL season. In June 2023, it was announced that long-time head coach Todd Dutiaume and Associate coach and Director of Player Development Jeff Hutchins would step back from their coaching roles with immediate effect. Dutiaume had been associated with Fife for 25 years, first as a player, then – from 2005 – as player/head coach, overseeing the Flyers' rise to the Elite League in 2011 and becoming full-time head coach in 2014. Meanwhile, Hutchins had first joined Fife back in 2016.

==== Coolen takes charge ====
At the end of June 2023, the Fife Flyers named experienced Canadian Tom Coolen as their new head coach. Coolen, a one-time former Buffalo Sabres assistant, had most recently coached Romanian side HSC Csíkszereda, and moved to Kirkcaldy having also worked behind the bench in Slovakia, Poland, Germany, Austria, Italy, Switzerland and Finland. Coolen led Fife to an 8th placed finish in his first season in charge.

However, after a number of player departures, and with a 2-15-2 record through 19 league games in the 2024–25 season, Coolen parted company with Fife on 20 December 2024. Player/assistant coach Johnny Curran, who had been ruled out for the rest of the season with an ACL injury, took on the interim coaching job alongside longtime former Fife coach Todd Dutiaume.

==== Wishart and Muir step aside ====
In February 2025, Fife's owners and directors Tom Muir and Jack Wishart announced their intention to step down from their roles after close to 30 years involved with the Flyers. In a joint statement, they also confirmed the jersey retirements of #11 Todd Dutiaume, #12 Steven King and the official jersey retirement of #17 Mark Morrison.

==== New ownership agreed ====
Fife ended the 2024–25 campaign with their worst record in the EIHL era, winning just five of 54 games (5-47-2), and faced an uncertain future as they searched for new ownership. However on the final weekend of the 2024–25 season, Fife confirmed they had an agreement in principle for new owners to take the club forward.

On June 5, 2025, the Fife Flyers confirmed a North American based group had financed and installed a new management team to take ownership of the club, led by former New Jersey Devils draft pick and Cardiff Devils legend Max Birbraer who arrived as General Manager and President.

Also arriving was the former long-time Managing Director and General Manager of the Glasgow Clan, Gareth Chalmers, who moved to Kirkcaldy as the Flyers' new Chief Commercial & Operation Officer. On 11 June 2025, the Flyers announced Jamie Russell as their new head coach and associate general manager.

In June 2025, the Flyers also announced they would actively look to strengthen ties with Kirkcaldy Ice Hockey Club / Kirkcaldy Kestrels to provide a stronger development pathway for would-be players looking to progress through the ranks to the Elite League level. As such, Kestrels head coach Steven Wishart was appointed as Head of Player Development/Pathway alongside his existing coaching duties.

However, Chalmers would resign from his post as Chief Commercial & Operation Officer in December 2025.

More change would come to the Flyers before the season's end. In January 2026, GM & President Max Birbraer stepped away from his day-to-day operational role due to health reasons.

The club appointed former Dundee United chairman Stephen Thompson as the club's new Chief Operating Officer, with former Dundee FC Head of Events John Brown joining as Head of Commercial.

There were also changes to the ownership structure in February 2026, with co-owner Tom Avery ousted, amid a reported growing concern about a financial crisis at the club. Short-term funding was secured to stabilise the club's immediate future.

The uncertain situation was compounded in late February 2026, as head coach Jamie Russell - who had taken on GM responsibilities after Birbraer's departure - tendered his own resignation, stating he could not "in good conscience" continue in post.

In May 2026, Fife confirmed the appointment of former NHLer and ex-Nottingham Panthers and Milton Keynes Lightning coach Tim Wallace as their new head coach and General Manager.

== Elite Ice Hockey League record ==
Season	League		Conference		Playoff	Challenge Cup
2011–12	EIHL	10th				Group
2012–13	EIHL	7th	Gardiner	2nd	QF	QF
2013–14	EIHL	7th	Gardiner	3rd	4th	QF
2014–15	EIHL	8th	Gardiner	2nd	QF	QF
2015–16	EIHL	6th	Gardiner	2nd	4th	QF
2016–17	EIHL	6th	Gardiner	3rd	QF	Group
2017–18	EIHL	7th	Gardiner	1st	4th	QF
2018–19	EIHL	6th	Gardiner	3rd	QF	Group
2019–20^{†}	EIHL	10th				Group
2020–21^{††}	EIHL	Cancelled			Cancelled	Cancelled
2021–22	EIHL	10th				QF
2022–23	EIHL	9th				Runners-up
2023–24	EIHL	8th			QF	QF
2024–25	EIHL	10th				Group
2025–26	EIHL	10th				Group

^{†} Note the 2019–20 season was cancelled in March 2020, with Fife having played 49 games, due to the Coronavirus pandemic. The league and play-offs finished without a winner and the above stat line reflects the Flyers' position at the time of the cancellation.

^{††} Note: The 2020–21 Elite League season – originally scheduled for a revised start date of 5 December – was suspended on 15 September 2020, because of ongoing coronavirus pandemic restrictions. The EIHL board determined that the season was non-viable without supporters being permitted to attend matches and unanimously agreed to a suspension. The season was cancelled completely in February 2021.

== Current squad ==
Squad for 2026–27 Elite League season

- * Denotes two-way deal with Kirkcaldy Kestrels of the SNL
- ** Denotes two-way deal with Edinburgh Capitals of the SNL
- *** Denotes two-way deal with Streatham Redhawks of the NIHL 1
- **** Denotes two-way deal with Solway IHC of the NIHL

Netminders
No.		Player	Catches	Acquired	Place of Birth	Joined from	Press Release
29	(Scotland)	Daniel Hadden*	Unknown	2026	Kirkcaldy, Scotland	Oxford Sabres U18, United Tier 1 Hockey League U18
32	(United States)	Blake Pietila	L	2026	Howell, United States	Sparta Sarpsborg, 2. divisjon
34	(Scotland)	Ben Keddie**	L	2025	Kirkcaldy, Scotland	Edinburgh Capitals, SNL
35	(England)	Max Van Mullem***	L	2026	Unknown	Streatham Redhawks, NIHL 1
88	(Scotland)	Jordan McLaughlin	L	2026	Falkirk, Scotland	Hull Seahawks, NIHL
98	(Czech Republic)	Dominik Groh	L	2026	Vrchlabí, Czech Republic	Wipptal Broncos, AlpsHL

Defencemen
No.		Player	Shoots	Acquired	Place of Birth	Joined from	Press Release
6	(Scotland)	Ethan Hadden	L	2025	Kirkcaldy, Scotland	Atlantic Coast Academy 18U AAA Prep, 18U AAA
10	(Sweden)	Victor Björkung	L	2026	Stockholm, Sweden	KH Zagłębie Sosnowiec, Polska Hokej Liga
18	(United States)	Joseph Pierce	R	2026	Ely, United States	Minnesota Duluth Bulldogs, NCAA
22	(Scotland)	Cole Giannandrea*	L	2025	Perth, Scotland	Kirkcaldy Kestrels, SNL
23	(Canada)	Max Coyle	R	2026	Tillsonburg, Canada	Aalborg Pirates, Metal Ligaen
24	(Canada)	Isack Bandu	L	2026	Notre-Dame-de-l'Île-Perrot, Canada	St. Lawrence Saints, NCAA
27	(Scotland)	Reece Kelly	R	2026	Fife, Scotland	Sheffield Steelers, EIHL
45	(Finland)	Joona Vainio	L	2026	Hämeenlinna, Finland	Kokkolan Hermes, Mestis
96	(England)	Ben Solder	L	2026	Chelmsford, England	Guildford Flames, EIHL

Forwards
No.		Player	Position	Acquired	Place of Birth	Joined from	Press Release
9	(United States)	Xander Lamppa	C/LW	2026	Rochester, United States	Maine Mariners, ECHL
19	(Canada)	Zachary Power	C	2026	Glencoe, Canada	Western Mustangs, U Sports
21	(Finland)	Mika Partanen	LW/RW	2026	Helsinki, Finland	TH Unia Oświęcim, Polska Hokej Liga
25	(Canada)	Lucas Chard	LW/C	2026	Burlington, Canada	Laurier Golden Hawks, U Sports
28	(Slovakia)	Michael Drábek	RW	2026	Partizánske, Slovakia	Vlci Žilina, Slovak Extraliga
37	(England)	Kyle Watson	F	2026	Wakefield, England	Sheffield Steeldogs, NIHL
39	(Canada)	Cameron Hough	F	2026	Uxbridge, Canada	Peterborough Phantoms, NIHL
41	(Scotland)	Lewis Young****	C/RW	2026	Irvine, Scotland	Solway IHC, NIHL
59	(United States)	Evan Dougherty	RW	2026	Kalamazoo, United States	Kalamazoo Wings, ECHL
74	(Canada)	Garet Hunt C	LW	2025	Maple Ridge, Canada	DVTK Jegesmedvék, Erste Liga
81	(Canada)	Cole Stewart	C	2026	Moncton, Canada	St. Francis Xavier X-Men, U Sports
86	(Canada)	Mike Petizian	LW	2026	Mississauga, Canada	UNB Reds, U Sports
90	(England)	Mason Alderson	LW/D	2025	London, England	Solway Sharks, NIHL
92	(Canada)	Chase Dubois	F	2026	Williams Lake, Canada	Diables Rouges de Briançon, Ligue Magnus

Team Staff
No.		Name	Position	Place of Birth	Joined from	Press Release
N/A	(United States)	Tim Wallace	Head coach & General Manager	Anchorage, United States	Appointed in 2026
N/A	(Israel) (Latvia) (United States)	Felix Kozak	Vice President	Riga, Latvia	Appointed in 2025
N/A	(Scotland)	Stephen Thompson	Chief Operating Officer	Scotland	Appointed in 2026
N/A	(Scotland)	John Brown	Head of Commercial	Scotland	Appointed in 2026
N/A	(Scotland)	Steven Wishart	Head of Player Development/Pathway	Kirkcaldy, Scotland	Appointed in 2025
N/A	(England)	Charles Humphreys	Equipment manager	Chester, England	Deeside Dragons, NIHL 1
N/A	(Scotland)	Ian Kelly	Assistant Equipment Manager	Kirkcaldy, Scotland	Glasgow Clan, EIHL
N/A	(Scotland)	Rebecca Thomson	Head of Social Media & Marketing	Scotland	Appointed in 2026

Recent departures
No.		Player	Position	Acquired	Leaving For	Press Release
4	(Canada)	Simon Després	D	2025	Fort Wayne Komets, ECHL
7	(Scotland)	Cameron Wilkie	D	2025	Paisley Pirates, SNL
8	(Canada)	Milan Lucic	LW	2025	Retired
10	(Sweden)	Johan Porsberger	RW	2025	SC Riessersee, Oberliga
18	(Canada)	Keaton Jameson	F	2025	Dundee Stars, EIHL
24	(Canada)	Ryan Nicholson	D	2025	Rapaces de Gap, Ligue Magnus
25	(Scotland)	Rowan Mills	F	2025	Billingham Stars, NIHL 1
26	(United States)	Jeremy Masella	D	2025	TBC
27	(Slovakia)	Richard Hartmann Jr.	F	2025	TBC
29	(United States)	Ethan Somoza	LW	2025	Jokers de Cergy-Pontoise, Ligue Magnus
30	(Scotland)	Cameron Kenny	G	2024	TBC
37	(Canada)	Christian Purboo	G	2025	TBC
44	(Sweden)	Jonas Emmerdahl	D	2025	Cardiff Devils, EIHL
50	(Canada)	Shane Owen	G	2021	Sheffield Steeldogs, NIHL
53	(Scotland)	Kian Shevlin	D	2025	Kirkcaldy Kestrels, SNL
56	(United States)	Andrew McLean	D	2025	Norfolk Admirals, ECHL
61	(United States) (United Kingdom) (Canada)	Logan Neilson	RW/C	2025	Diables Rouges de Briançon, Ligue Magnus
62	(Scotland)	Keegan Cairns	D	2025	TBC
65	(United States)	Ian Scheid A	D	2025	TBC
71	(Canada)	Justin Ducharme	RW/LW	2025	Guildford Flames, EIHL
91	(Canada)	Josh Winquist A	C	2025	Atlanta Gladiators, ECHL
93	(Scotland)	Ben Brown	F/D	2024	Dundee Stars, EIHL

== Retired jersey numbers ==
- 11 (Canada) (United Kingdom) Todd Dutiaume, first joined the club in the 1998-99 season, playing regularly until 2013. He coached the team from 2005 until 2023, before serving in an exclusive off-ice capacity. His jersey was retired in early 2025.
- 12 (Scotland) Steven King, played his entire career with the Fife Flyers, making his debut in the 1989-90 season and last playing in 2012-13. His jersey was also retired in early 2025.
- 16 (Scotland) Gordon Latto, the team's longest serving player who started playing with Fife Flyers in 1972 and retired in 1998, recording 974 games with a total of 1,265 points.
- 17 (Canada) Mark Morrison
- 47 (Canada) Frank Morris

== Other jerseys ==
- 14 – Was considered unlucky and taken out of circulation following a serious eye injury to the British forward Andy Linton and a career-ending injury to the Canadian defenceman Calvert Brown, but has been re-introduced in recent years.

== Player records ==
All time statistics

- Most games played: 974 – Gordon Latto (Snr): (1972–1998)
- Most points: 1265 – Gordon Latto (Snr): (1972–1998)
- Most goals all time: 393 – Mark Morrison (1993–2005)

Season records

- Most goals in a season: 108 – Dave Stoyanovich (1984–85)
- Most assists in a season: 117 – Dave Stoyanovich (1986–87)
- Most points in a season: 211 – Richard LaPlante (1991–92); 189 – Mark Morrison (1993–94); 188 – Bud Scrutton (1948–49); 185 – Dave Stoyanovich (1984–85) & Chick Mann (1948–49)
- Most powerplay goals in a season: 38 – Russell Monteith (1999–00)
- Most shorthanded goals in a season: 13 – Doug Smail (1993–94)
- Most shut-outs in a season: 7 – Blair Daly (2006–07); 5 – Roy Reid (1964–65)

Game records (all players)

- Fastest goal in 1 game: 6 seconds – Les Lovell (1975)
- Most goals in 1 game: 13 – Dave Stoyanovich (1984)
- Most assists in 1 game: 13 – Steve Moria (1987)
- Most points in 1 game: 17 – Richard LaPlante (1991)

Game records (home based players)

- Most goals in 1 game: 8 – Jimmy Spence (1964); 7 – Les Lovell (1976) & John Haig (1997)
- Most assists in 1 game: 9 – Gordon Latto(Snr) (1977) & Ally Brennan (1976)
- Most points in 1 game: 11 – Gordon Latto(Snr), John Taylor & Les Lovell (all 1977) 10 – John Haig & Steven King (1997) 9 – Chic Cottrell (1974)

== BIHWA Hall of Fame inductees ==
- (Canada) Floyd Snider (1951)
- (Scotland) Jack Dryburgh (1991)
- (Scotland) Lawrie Lovell (1992)
- (Scotland) Gordon Latto (1999)
- (Canada) Jim Lynch (2001)

== All Star honours ==
Player of the Year Trophy

- (Scotland) Les Lovell 1970–71
- (Scotland) Ally Brennan 1972–73
- (Scotland) Gordon Latto 1976–77, 1977–78, 1978–79
- (Canada) Dave Stoyanovich 1984–85
- (Canada) Doug Smail 1993–94
- (Canada) Mark Morrison 1996–97, 1997–98
- (Scotland) Stephen Murphy 1999–00

Coach of the Year Trophy

- (Canada) Al Rodgers 1946–47, 1947–48, 1949–50
- (Scotland) Lawrie Lovell 1975–76
- (Canada) Ron Plumb 1984–85
- (Canada) Brian Kanewischer 1990–91
- (Canada) Mark Morrison 1996–97, 1997–98, 1999–00, 2003–04

Player's Player of the Year

- (Canada) Mark Morrison 1997–98
- (Scotland) Stephen Murphy 1999–00

Netminder of the Year

- (Scotland) Stephen Murphy 1999–00

Ahearne Medal

- (Scotland) Gordon Latto 1998

Rookie of the Year

- (Scotland) Chic Cottrell 1970–71

Young Player of the Year

- (Scotland) Iain Robertson 1989–90

EIHL All Stars Second Team

- (Canada) Derek Keller 2012–13
- (Canada) Shane Owen 2016–17

== Notable former players ==
- (Canada) Ron Plumb
- (Czechoslovakia) Vincent Lukáč
- (Canada) Doug Smail
- (Canada) Laurie Boschman
- (United Kingdom) Jimmy Chappell
- (Canada) Al Sims
- (Canada) Mark Morrison

== Honours ==
- Celtic League Playoffs: 2008–09, 2009–10
- Celtic League Cup: 2008–09, 2009–10
- British National League: 1999–00, 2003–04
- Grand Slam: 1977, 1999–00, 2005–06, 2006–07
- British Champions: 1976–77, 1977–78, 1984–85, 1998–99, 1999–00
- Scottish Premier Hockey League Champions: 2007–08
- Scottish Premier League Play-off: 2007–08
- Northern League Play-off: 2007–08, 2008–09, 2010–11
- Northern League Champions: 1976–77, 1977–78, 1996–97, 1997–98, 2005–06, 2006–07, 2007–08, 2010–11
- Autumn Cup: 1949–50, 1972, 1975, 1976, 2005, 2008
- Scottish League: 1939–40, 1948–49, 1949–50, 1963–64, 1990–91, 1995–96, 2005–06, 2006–07
- Scottish Cup: 1984–85, 1993–94, 1994–95, 1997–98, 1998–99, 1999–00, 2000–01, 2005–06, 2006–07, 2008–09, 2009–10
- Challenge Cup runners-up 2022–23
