= 1995–96 BHL season =

- Sport: ice hockey

Seasons
- ← 1994–95 1996–97 →

The 1995–96 BHL season was the 14th and final season of the British Hockey League, the top level of ice hockey in Great Britain. It was replaced by the Ice Hockey Superleague for 1996–97. 10 teams participated in the league, and the Sheffield Steelers won the league title by finishing first in the regular season. They also won the playoff championship.

== Regular season ==
Team	GP	W	T	L	GF	GA	Pts
Sheffield Steelers	36	27	5	4	268	122	59
Cardiff Devils	36	26	3	7	271	140	55
Durham Wasps	36	22	4	10	213	158	48
Nottingham Panthers	36	19	5	12	214	174	43
Humberside Hawks	36	16	4	16	202	235	36
Fife Flyers	36	14	6	16	209	238	34
Basingstoke Bison	36	11	5	20	146	190	27
Newcastle Warriors	36	10	4	22	167	256	24
Milton Keynes Kings	36	7	7	22	186	237	21
Slough Jets	36	5	3	28	172	298	13

== Playoffs ==
=== Group A ===
Group A	GP	W	T	L	GF	GA	Pts
Sheffield Steelers	6	4	0	2	31	12	8
Nottingham Panthers	6	3	2	1	20	21	8
Basingstoke Bison	6	2	1	3	24	28	5
Fife Flyers	6	1	1	4	22	36	3

=== Group B ===
Group B	GP	W	T	L	GF	GA	Pts
Durham Wasps	6	5	0	1	30	18	10
Humberside Hawks	6	4	0	2	41	31	8
Cardiff Devils	6	3	0	3	28	22	6
Newcastle Warriors	6	0	0	6	14	42	0

=== Semifinals ===
- Sheffield Steelers 6-3 Humberside Hawks
- Nottingham Panthers 3-1 Durham Wasps

=== Final ===
- Sheffield Steelers 3-3 (2-1 SO) Nottingham Panthers

Preceded by 1994–95 BHL season	BHL seasons	Succeeded by 1996–97 ISL season
