= Hull Thunder =

Ice hockey team in Hull, England

- City: Kingston upon Hull, England
- League: BNL
- Founded: 1999
- Operated: 1999–2002
- Home arena: Hull Arena; Capacity: 2000; Ice size: 197ft x 98ft
- Colours: White, Purple, Black

The Hull Thunder were a British ice hockey club from Kingston upon Hull, England. Formed in 1999, it competed in the now defunct British National League playing its home games at the Hull Arena.

The club replaced the Humberside Seahawks, which existed from 1988 until 1999.

The team ran into financial problems in 2001 and was bought. After a promising pre-season, the team under the new owners again ran into financial trouble, resulting in it finishing the 2002 season without any imports.

A new team was formed in 2003 called Hull Stingrays, which played the majority of its time in the Elite Ice Hockey League before folding in 2015. The Hull Stingrays were quickly replaced by the Hull Pirates and debuted in the 2015-16 English Premier Ice Hockey League.
