= Peterborough Pirates =

Ice hockey team in Peterborough, England

- City: Peterborough, England
- League: British National League
- Founded: 1982
- Operated: 1982–2002
- Home arena: Planet Ice Peterborough; Capacity: 1250; Ice size: 180ft x 85ft
- Colours: White, orange, and black

The Peterborough Pirates were an English ice hockey team. It was established in 1982, as the senior adult semi-professional team of the newly formed Peterborough Ice Hockey Club.

The Pirates, based at the East of England Ice Rink, Peterborough, played in the British National League. Their logo was a copy of the Philadelphia Flyers in the NHL.

A notable former player was Garry Unger, who previously played in the National Hockey League. During the 1986–87 season he played 30 games scoring 95 goals and 143 assists. And in the 1987/88 season he played 32 games scoring 37 goals and 44 assists.

Other former players of note to have played for Pirates were former Washington Capitals NHL defenceman Jim McTaggart of Weyburn, Saskatchewan, Canada; former Montreal Canadiens draftee and NHL St Louis Blues defenceman Michael Dark; former Vancouver Canucks, New York Rangers, Quebec Nordiques, Buffalo Sabres and Philadelphia Flyers NHL player Jere Gillis; Randy Smith, who was a silver medalist with Team Canada at the 1992 Winter Olympics; and former NHL Toronto Maple Leaf draftee Cam Plante.

Former coaches of note apart from Garry Unger, Cam Plante and Randy Smith was former NHL player for the Toronto Maple Leafs and Pittsburgh Penguins Rocky Saganiuk who took the Pirates to the Heineken British Championships at the Wembley Arena in 1991, where they finished as runners-up to Durham Wasps in the final after beating Cardiff Devils in the semis. In their final season (2001–02) the team was coached by Glenn Mulvenna who had played with the Pittsburgh Penguins and Philadelphia Flyers.

The Pirates folded in April 2002, when directors founded a new team Peterborough Phantoms, who played in the English Premier Ice Hockey League.
