= Humberside Seahawks =

Ice hockey team in Hull, England

- Founded: 1988
- Team history: Humberside Seahawks; 1988–1993; Humberside Hawks; 1993–1996; Kingston Hawks; 1996–1999
- Based in: Hull, England
- Arena: Hull Arena
- Colours: White, Black & Silver

Humberside Seahawks, later known as Humberside Hawks and then Kingston Hawks, were an English ice hockey club from Kingston upon Hull. Founded in 1988, the club played their home games at Hull Arena. The club went through several name changes due to council influence before dissolving in 1999. Since that time, the club was followed first by Hull Thunder from 1999 until 2002, the Hull Stingrays from 2003 until 2015, the Hull Pirates from 2015 until 2020, and the Hull Seahawks since 2022.

== History ==
=== Early years ===
The Humberside Seahawks were founded in 1988 under the ownership of Humberside County Council and the management of Adrian Florence. Beginning life in the old Heineken League Division 2, Canadian player-coach Dale Lambert quickly led the fledgling Seahawks to glory, winning the Division 2 title (and promotion to Division 1) in their inaugural season. Just two seasons later, in 1990/91, the Seahawks lost just three games in winning the Division 1 title, which they followed up by winning their play-off group and gaining promotion to the Heineken League Premier Division after just three years in the league.

In their first season in the top flight the Seahawks quickly made their mark. Thrilling home wins against reigning champions, Durham Wasps, and runners up, Cardiff Devils, backed up bench coach Peter Johnson's bold claim that they would be battling in the top four, not against relegation. He was true to his word, leading the team to fourth place and the final of the Autumn Cup, a 5–7 defeat to the Nottingham Panthers, in the first final staged at the brand new 10,000 seat Sheffield Arena. Few doubt the season might have been more successful had it not been for long-term injuries to star imports Jim Lynch, Scott Morrison and Ross Lambert, who was also fined and suspended for threatening revenge on Wasp Stephen Cooper.

"Think Humberside Seahawks, think 1992/93, think Wembley!" – Malcolm Richardson, Hull Daily Mail.

1992/93 was to be Seahawks last. Fittingly it was also their most successful. Despite finishing 7th in the league – a feat no doubt inspired by the pre-season turmoil that saw first Ross Lambert and then Peter Johnson assume the role of head coach – Seahawks secured a 6–5 victory over the Wasps to win the Castle Eden Cup, a traditional two-day tournament held in February and featuring four teams based in the North East of England.

More impressive, however, was the tenacity that saw the team overcome the Bees and Whitley Warriors in the play-offs to create history as the first seventh place team to reach the end of season finals weekend, then held at Wembley Arena.

The semi-final against the Nottingham Panthers was a see-saw affair which saw the Seahawks leading 4–2 in the third period when a section of the surrounding Plexi-glass was broken, necessitating a 25-minute stoppage in play. Panthers returned from the dressing room to dominate the remainder of the third period and tie the score at 4–4. In overtime, Nottingham continued to dominate play, with star forward Paul Adey spurning a couple of good chances to win the match. With both sets of fans on the edge of their seats (and the overtime period causing the live snooker coverage to be delayed on BBC1) a Panthers turnover fell to Seahawks' Dan Dorion (and ex-Panther himself) who was cruising the blue line. Dorion skated towards the Panthers' zone with the puck and laid in a pinpoint pass to Kevin McNaught, who round the Panthers' goaltender and put away the sudden death winner and send the Seahawks into the final.

A 7–4 defeat to the Cardiff Devils in the final the following day did little to dampen the Hull fans' spirits. Despite the knowledge that a sponsorship with British Aerospace was to see the team renamed the Hawks for the 1993–94 season, the Seahawks' place in the history books was assured.

=== New beginnings ===
In 1994, Founder Dale Lambert was released from the club, ushering in new leadership from Eastern Europe. Ukrainians Alexei Kuznetsov and Alexandr Koulikov joined returning coaching staff Frank Killen, Brian Cox, Mike Bishop and the Johnson brothers.

96–97 began with the end of the Johnson dynasty and ended with the death of the Hawk. John Griffith replaced the popular Peter Johnson, his sons, Stephen, Anthony and Shaun, quickly showing their anger by returning home to Tyneside and the newly renamed Newcastle Wasps. Uncertainty of a future was doubled when it was announced that Humberside County Council was to be abolished – and the team's funding with it. Humberside was to be no more, but like the Seahawks before, uncertainty only served to inspire a glorious ending.

Griffith's tenure was inconsistent although his sacking immediately before the play-offs came as a surprise as his side had never slipped below 5th place. His team was also easily the best since the Wembley class of 92–93, the Brit pack of John Wolfe, naughty Norman Pinnington and the re-classified Bishop and Graham Garden, combining well with veterans Andy Steel and Paul Simpson, and imports Phil Huber, Barclay Pearce, and ex-NHLers Derek Laxdal and Bruce Bell. His replacement, ex-Bees coach Keith Milhench, utilised these resources to full effect, overcoming the loss of Bell. This time the yellow brick roaded ended in a 3–6 semi-final defeat to Sheffield Steelers. Once again though the end ensured the Hawks would never be forgotten.

=== Name changes ===
Since the days of the Hawks, Ice Hockey in Hull has undergone major surgery with contrasting results. Keith Milhench's Kingston Hawks joined the newly formed Premier League and went against the belief amongst the loyal as successive pre-season victories over the Superleague Manchester Storm suggested the likes of Chris Eimers, Oleg Synkov and Danuse Bauba might be able to restore the city to the countries elite. Instead, the big name signings and returns of the likes of Dale Lambert, Mike Bishop and Ron Shudra failing to compensate the constant name changes and poor league positions that until recently had become near permanent. Following the Hawks came the Hull Thunder and most recently the Hull Stingrays. None have come close to rivalling the Seahawks in terms of size and success although Mike and Sue Pack at least restored security and a place in the Elite League. The Stingrays debuted at 9th place. On 11 August 2010, they closed the club due to financial problems, but six days later were taken over by the owners of Coventry Blaze, which secured their survival. However, on 24 June 2015, Following severe financial instability, the Stingrays ceased operations and withdrew from the Elite League. Afterwards, the Hull Pirates were founded as their replacement.

== Honours ==
- English League
  - Champions (1): 1988–89
- British Championship
  - Runners-up (1): 1993
- Autumn Cup
  - Runners-up (1): 1991

== Noted players ==
Scott Morrison

Morrison joined the Seahawks from Whitley Warriors in 1989, scoring 159 points in 39 games. Widely considered to be the finest player to grace the ice in Hull, Morrison scored another 220 points before an argument saw him transfer to the Billingham Bombers, and then back to the Warriors. In 95–96 the chain-smoking sniper returned as a Hawk, netting 89 goals and 187 points in 60 games. He left with Peter Johnson. enjoying a successful, nomadic career that took in the Basingstoke Bison and Ayr Scottish Eagles amongst others.

Dale Lambert

The big Canadian defender originally joined the Seahawks as player-coach from the Medway Bears, helping GM Adrian Florence mould the team into a successful franchise. Considered to be rugged and likeable, he quickly became to the Seahawks what Shannon Hope was to the Devils and Shudra to the Steelers – vacating his coaching duties in 1993 only to concentrate on playing. But Wembley was to be his swansong, the love affair ending as a trade to the Solihull Barons was followed by spells in Milton Keynes, Durham, Newcastle, and Phoenix in the WCHL. He finally returned as coach of the Kingston Hawks in 1999–2000. Due to a broken leg and less gifted players, however, meant the good times were not to be repeated.

Dan Dorion

The skilful American forward first joined the Seahawks in 92–93, the former Panther and 91–92 player of the year quickly inspiring Humberside to a six-game winning streak that guaranteed seventh position and a play-off place. The New York native scored 86 points in just 27 games, with 9 goals and 12 assists in the Seahawks march to Wembley. Although he left for the ECHLs Roanoke Express in 1994 he again answered Peter Johnson's call and returned to replace the injured Hawk Kuznetsov, once again inspiring an immediate change in the club's fortunes. Despite 98 points in 34 games however, he could not bring about a return to the promised land.

Shaun Johnson

Youngest of the Johnson brothers, "Shuggy" was a crowd favourite ever since his arrival with the Johnson clan from Durham in 1990. Living in his brothers shadows he first emerged as a future star in 1991–92 – receiving the first of many GB caps – and 94–95 when he won the Player's Player of the Year Award at the age of 21. In 95–96, the winger joined his brothers in returning to the Wasps, where he quickly turned from a young star into experienced professional. After spells with Newcastle and Coventry he is now back home with the Vipers in the Elite League, rivals to the Stingrays. He is one of the most respected players in Britain and is the last remaining member of the Johnson dynasty.

Stephen Johnson

"Quacks" Johnson is the eldest and by far the most popular of the Johnson brothers in Hull. His number 10 shirt was retired in tribute to his time at the club, much of which was spent as captain. He was also the first brother to return after his family's infamous split with the Hawks – returning from the Wasps in 1998–99 to play in the British National League with Kingston, Thunder and finally the Stingrays. At the time of his retirement he had scored more than 1000 points and 600+ goals in all games. his number 10 shirt is the only one so far retired by the Hull organisation.

Anthony Johnson

Middle brother and AC for the Seahawks, "Tant" played in jersey number 12. Despite his departure, like his brother he claimed he would never have left Hull were it not for the mistreatment of their father. He returned in the white and purple of the Thunder in 1999–2000, effectively ending his career in his spiritual home.

=== Squads ===
(1992–93) – Scott Morrison (I)(F), Todd Bidner (I)(F), Ross Lambert (I)(F), Sylvain Naud (I)(F), Bobby Brown (I)(F), Ransom Drcar (I)(F), Stephen Johnson (F), Anthony Johnson (F), Shaun Johnson (F), Nigel Rhodes (F), Grant Slater (F), Andy Steel (F), Jim Lynch (I)(D), Dale Lambert (PC)(I)(D), Paul Dixon (D), Mark Pallister (D), Paul Simpson (D), Stewart Carvil (D), Bobby McEwen (D), Lee Barley (D), Lee Wilson (D), Frankie Killen (NM), Andy Donald (NM), Ian Young (NM), David Selby (NM). Peter Johnson (Bench Coach)

(1993–94) – Dan Dorian (I)(F), T.Bidner, B.Brown, Chris Hobson (F), Aaron Burn (F), Danny Parkin (F), A.Johnson, St.Johnson, Sh.Johnson, G.Slater, Mike Bishop (I)(D), Kevin McNaughton (RI)(D/F), D.Lambert, Gavin De Jonge (F), Andy Giles (F), Craig Bowles (D), P.Simpson, S.Carvil, L.Barley, Brian Cox (NM), Paul Cast (NM), Kenny Johnson (NM), F.Killen, Lee.Wilson(D).

Others

Mike Andrews, Rick Strachan,

=== Retired Shirts ===
10 – Stephen Johnson
