= British National League (1996–2005) =

United Kingdom ice hockey league

- Sport: Ice hockey
- Founded: 1996
- Folded: 2005
- No. of teams: 12 (peak)
- Country: United Kingdom
- Last champion: Dundee Stars
- Sponsor: Findus (2000–03)

The British National League (BNL) was the second tier of professional ice hockey in the United Kingdom between 1996 and 2005. Although no formal promotion and relegation existed during its period of existence, it was considered to have been a standard below that of the Ice Hockey Superleague (later replaced by the Elite Ice Hockey League) and above that of the English National Ice Hockey League and the Scottish National League (and later, following its creation, the English Premier Ice Hockey League). Fife Flyers and Guildford Flames were the only two teams to consistently feature in the BNL during every season of the league's history.

== History ==
The league was founded in 1996 to replace the first division of the British Hockey League following the split between the two divisions of the league; the premier division having been replaced by the Ice Hockey Superleague at the same time. For its first season only the BNL was split into the Northern Premier League and the Premier League. From 2000 until 2003, it was sponsored by Findus.

The BNL was disbanded at the end of the 2004/05 season, Edinburgh Capitals and Newcastle Vipers both left the league and applied to join the first tier EIHL (with whom the BNL had conducted a crossover competition with during its final season). Both the Capitals and the Vipers then withdrew their applications so as to let the remaining five BNL teams submit applications to join the EIHL with them. However, the terms set by the EIHL were deemed unacceptable by the other teams, and so the Capitals and the Vipers both resubmitted their own applications and were accepted into the EIHL. With only five teams remaining, the BNL folded; leaving all of its remaining five clubs to join other leagues. Bracknell Bees, Guildford Flames, and Hull Stingrays all joined the EPIHL; which replaced the BNL as the second tier of English hockey (it having previously been the third tier), whilst Dundee Stars and Fife Flyers joined the EPIHL's Scottish counterpart; the Scottish National League. All of these teams, with the exception of Bracknell Bees, became members of the EIHL in later seasons, with Hull Stingrays making the move in 2006, before being joined by Dundee Stars in 2010, Fife Flyers in 2011 and Guildford Flames in 2017.

== Teams ==
- Basingstoke Bison (1998–2003)
- Blackburn Hawks (1996–1998)
- Bracknell Bees (2003–2005)
- Cardiff Devils (2001–2003)
- Cardiff Rage (1997–1998)
- Castlereagh Knights (1996–1997)
- Coventry Blaze (1996–1997, 1999–2003)
- Dumfries Vikings (1996–1997)
- Dundee Stars (2001–2005)
- Edinburgh Capitals (1998–2005)
- Fife Flyers (1996–2005)
- Guildford Flames (1996–2005)
- Hull Stingrays (2003–2005)
- Hull Thunder (1999–2003)
- Humberside Seahawks (1996–1999)
- Medway Bears (1996–1997)
- Milton Keynes Kings (1999–2003)
- Murrayfield Racers (1996–1998)
- Newcastle Vipers (2002–2005)
- Paisley Pirates (1996–2002)
- Peterborough Pirates (1996–2002)
- Slough Jets (1996–2002)
- Swindon Wildcats (1996–1997)
- Telford Tigers (1996–1999)
- Telford Timberwolves (1999–2000)
- Whitley Warriors (1996–1997)

== Champions ==
=== Regular season ===
- 1996/97 Fife Flyers (north) / Swindon Ice Lords (south)
- 1997/98 Guildford Flames
- 1998/99 Slough Jets
- 1999/00 Fife Flyers
- 2000/01 Guildford Flames
- 2001/02 Dundee Stars
- 2002/03 Coventry Blaze
- 2003/04 Fife Flyers
- 2004/05 Bracknell Bees

=== Playoffs ===
- 1996/97 Fife Flyers (north) / Swindon Ice Lords (south)
- 1997/98 Guildford Flames
- 1998/99 Fife Flyers
- 1999/00 Fife Flyers
- 2000/01 Guildford Flames
- 2001/02 Dundee Stars
- 2002/03 Coventry Blaze
- 2003/04 Guildford Flames
- 2004/05 Dundee Stars
