= Lipsey =

Lipsey is a surname. Notable people with the surname include:

- Alexander Lipsey (born 1950), Democratic politician from the U.S. state of Michigan
- Daryl Lipsey (born 1963), ice hockey player and coach
- David Lipsey, Baron Lipsey (1948–2025), British Labour Party politician
- Joshua Lipsey (born 1983), Canadian fitness coach and entrepreneur
- Matt Lipsey, British television and film director
- Richard Lipsey (born 1928), Canadian academic and economist
- Stanford Lipsey (1927–2016), American newspaper publisher
- Tamin Lipsey (born 2003), American basketball player
