= 2021–22 NIHL National League season =

The 2021/22 edition of the NIHL National League involved 9 teams from across the United Kingdom.

== Season overview ==
The NIHL National hosted 4 tournaments across the season:

- National Autumn Cup
- National Cup
- National League
- National Playoffs

Competition	Champions	Runners-up
National Autumn Cup	Swindon Wildcats	Leeds Knights
National Cup	Sheffield Steeldogs	Telford Tigers
National League	Telford Tigers	Swindon Wildcats
National Playoffs	Sheffield Steeldogs	Milton Keynes Lightning

== National Autumn Cup ==
2021/22 National Autumn Cup

Tournament details
- Dates: 17 September 2021 – 23 December 2021
- Teams: 9

Final positions
- Champions: Swindon Wildcats
- Runners-up: Leeds Knights

Tournament statistics
- Scoring leader(s): Jason Hewitt (Sheffield Steeldogs) (26 points)

The National Autumn Cup was hosted between 17 September and 23 November 2021, each team playing each other once in the group stage (either home or away) totalling 8 matches.

=== Group stage ===
The group stage took place between 17 September and 10 October 2021. Teams receive 2 points for a win and 1 point for an overtime loss. In the event that two or more teams were tied on points, goal difference was used to determine the rankings.

Group Stage Table
Pos	Team	Pld	W	OTW	OTL	L	GF	GA	Pts	Qualification
1	Sheffield Steeldogs	8	6	0	1	1	41	20	13	Advance to the semi-finals
2	Leeds Knights	8	6	0	0	2	45	25	12	Advance to the semi-finals
3	Telford Tigers	8	5	0	0	3	31	30	10	Advance to the semi-finals
4	Swindon Wildcats	8	4	0	1	3	29	28	9	Advance to the semi-finals
5	Peterborough Phantoms	8	3	1	0	4	27	34	8	
6	Basingstoke Bison	8	3	0	1	4	27	28	7	
7	Bees IHC	8	3	0	0	5	26	36	6	
8	Milton Keynes Lightning	8	1	2	0	5	23	36	6	
9	Raiders IHC	8	1	1	1	5	28	40	5	

=== Knockouts ===
The knockouts took place between 11 November and 23 December 2021. Since Sheffield Steeldogs placed 1st in the group stage, they got to select their semi-final opponent and chose Leeds Knights Matches were played over two legs, one home and one away with the aggregate score (shown in bold) the decider of who advances. If it was level after the 120 minutes of play, 5 minutes of overtime was played and if still not tied it went to a shootout.

Semifinals
1	Sheffield Steeldogs	1	5	**6**
2	Leeds Knights	3	6	**9**
3	Telford Tigers	3	4	**7**
4	Swindon Wildcats	6	6	**12**

Final
2	Leeds Knights	2	4	**6**
4	Swindon Wildcats	3	5	**8**

=== Final rankings ===
Pos	Team	
1	Swindon Wildcats	Champions
2	Leeds Knights	Runners-up
=3	Sheffield Steeldogs	
=3	Telford Tigers	
5	Peterborough Phantoms	
6	Basingstoke Bison	
7	Bees IHC	
8	Milton Keynes Lightning	
9	Raiders IHC	

=== Leaders ===
Points
Pos	Player	Team	Points
1	Jason Hewitt	Sheffield Steeldogs	26
2	Kerian Brown	Leeds Knights	24
=3	Matt Bissonnette	Sheffield Steeldogs	22
=3	Brandon Whistle	Leeds Knights	22
5	Aaron Nell	Swindon Wildcats	19

Goals
Pos	Player	Team	Goals
1	Jason Hewitt	Sheffield Steeldogs	14
2	Kerian Brown	Leeds Knights	13
3	Brandon Whistle	Leeds Knights	11
4	Emil Svec	Swindon Wildcats	10
=5	Aaron Connolly	Raiders IHC	9

Assists
Pos	Player	Team	Points
1	Matt Bissonnette	Sheffield Steeldogs	16
2	Jason Hewitt	Sheffield Steeldogs	12
3	Thomasz Malasinski	Swindon Wildcats	12
=4	Cole Shudra	Leeds Knights	11
=4	Kieran Brown	Leeds Knights	11

== National Cup ==
2021/22 National Cup

Tournament details
- Dates: 16 October 2021 – 30 March 2022
- Teams: 9

The National Cup was hosted between 16 October 2021 and 2 January 2022. These matches were the same matches that counted towards the National League, the first time each team player each other home and away.

=== Group stage ===
The group stage took place between 16 October 2021 and 2 January 2022. Teams receive 2 points for a win and 1 point for an overtime loss. In the event that two or more teams were tied on points, goal difference was used to determine the rankings.

Group Stage Table
Pos	Team	Pld	W	OTW	OTL	L	GF	GA	Pts	Qualification
1	Swindon Wildcats	16	9	3	3	1	67	41	27	Advance to the semi-finals
2	Telford Tigers	16	10	1	1	4	70	51	23	Advance to the semi-finals
3	Sheffield Steeldogs	16	10	0	0	6	54	47	20	Advance to the semi-finals
4	Milton Keynes Lightning	16	10	0	0	6	61	63	20	Advance to the semi-finals
5	Leeds Knights	16	6	1	0	2	57	67	14	
6	Peterborough Phantoms	16	6	0	1	9	55	57	13	
7	Bees IHC	16	6	0	1	9	53	58	13	
8	Raiders IHC	16	4	1	1	10	46	65	11	
9	Basingstoke Bison	16	4	1	0	11	58	72	10	

=== Knockouts ===
Since Swindon Wildcats placed 1st in the Group Stage, they got to select their semi-final opponent and chose Sheffield Steeldogs Matches were played over two legs, one home and one away with the aggregate score (shown in bold) the decider of who advances. If it was level after the 120 minutes of play, 5 minutes of overtime was played and if still tied it went to a shootout.

Semifinals
1	Swindon Wildcats	1	3	**4**
3	Sheffield Steeldogs	1	4	**5**
2	Telford Tigers	4	6	**10**
4	Milton Keynes Lightning	6	2	**8**

Final
2	Telford Tigers	3	2	**5**
3	Sheffield Steeldogs	6	2	**8**

=== Final rankings ===
Pos	Team	
1	Sheffield Steeldogs	Champions
2	Telford Tigers	Runners-up
=3	Swindon Wildcats	
=3	Milton Keynes Lightning	
5	Leeds Knights	
6	Peterborough Phantoms	
7	Bees IHC	
9	Raiders IHC	
6	Basingstoke Bison	

== National League ==
2021/22 National Cup
Tournament details
- Dates: 16 October 2021 – 3 April 2022
- Teams: 9

The National League makes the majority of the games within the season, with each time playing each other a total of 6 times, 3 home and 3 away. The top 8 teams also qualify for the National Playoffs, with the 9th team missing out

Table
Pos	Team	Pld	W	OTW	OTL	L	GF	GA	Pts	Qualification
C	Telford Tigers (Q)	48	29	4	4	11	208	150	70	National League Playoffs
2	Swindon Wildcats (Q)	48	23	4	6	15	179	170	60	National League Playoffs
3	Sheffield Steeldogs (Q)	48	25	2	3	18	164	151	53	National League Playoffs
4	Leeds Knights (Q)	48	23	4	2	19	186	172	56	National League Playoffs
5	Milton Keynes Lightning (Q)	48	23	2	4	19	197	195	54	National League Playoffs
6	Peterborough Phantoms (Q)	48	22	3	2	21	173	160	52	National League Playoffs
7	Basingstoke Bison (Q)	48	17	4	3	24	177	190	45	National League Playoffs
8	Bees IHC (Q)	48	14	1	3	30	161	200	33	National League Playoffs
9	Raiders IHC	46	12	4	1	31	135	192	30*	

*Raiders IHC were deducted 3 points for failure to fulfill a fixture on 19 December 2021

(Q) Qualified for the National League Playoffs

== National League playoffs ==
=== Group stage ===
The 8 teams that make it to the playoffs are split into two groups, Group A and B based on their placing in the National League. Each team plays each other twice, one at home and once away. The top 2 from each group proceed to the Final 4 weekend.

Group A
Pos	Team	Pld	W	OTL	L	GF	GA	Pts	Qualification
1	Telford Tigers	6	5	0	1	30	19	10	Advance to Final 4
2	Milton Keynes Lightning	6	4	1	1	23	15	9	Advance to Final 4
3	Bees IHC	6	3	1	2	21	29	7	Eliminated
4	Leeds Knights	6	0	1	5	20	26	1	Eliminated

Group B
Pos	Team	Pld	W	OTL	L	GF	GA	Pts	Qualification
1	Peterborough Phantoms	6	4	0	2	23	14	8	Advance to Final 4
2	Sheffield Steeldogs	6	3	0	3	20	19	6	Advance to Final 4
3	Basingstoke Bison	6	3	0	3	18	19	6	Eliminated
4	Swindon Wildcats	6	2	0	4	16	25	4	Eliminated

=== Knockouts ===
- Semifinals
- Telford Tigers 1–3 Sheffield Steeldogs
- Peterborough Phantoms 5–6 Milton Keynes Lightning
- Final
- Sheffield Steeldogs 4–1 Milton Keynes Lightning
