= Sara Murphy (film producer) =

American film producer

- Occupation: Producer
- Years active: 2005–present

Sara Murphy is an American music video and film producer, known for her works with Paul Thomas Anderson, Philip Seymour Hoffman, Aaron Katz and Barry Jenkins. Throughout her career, Murphy has won the Independent Spirit John Cassavetes Award for Land Ho!, the Independent Spirit Award for Best Film for If Beale Street Could Talk and numerous awards. She also won the Academy Award for Best Picture for One Battle After Another.

== Career ==
Murphy initially went to school for engineering, and eventually landed a job as Philip Seymour Hoffman's assistant. In 2010, she served as an associate producer on Jack Goes Boating directed by Hoffman.

In 2014, Murphy produced Land Ho! directed by Martha Stephens and Aaron Katz, which won the Independent Spirit John Cassavetes Award.

After Hoffman's death in 2014, Murphy was hired by Paul Thomas Anderson to produce a music video. She has served as producer on his music videos for Joanna Newsom, Haim, Radiohead, and The Smile. In 2019, Murphy served as producer for Thom Yorke's music film Anima, which was nominated at the 62nd Annual Grammy Awards for Best Music Film.

Murphy has also worked at PASTEL, the production company founded by Barry Jenkins, where she produced Never Rarely Sometimes Always and If Beale Street Could Talk, winning for the latter the Independent Spirit Award for Best Film. In 2021, Murphy produced Paul Thomas Anderson's Licorice Pizza, which she was nominated for the BAFTA Award for Best Film and Academy Award for Best Picture.

In 2022, Murphy launched Fat City alongside Ryan Zacarias, where she has produced Mother, Couch and If I Had Legs I'd Kick You. In 2025, she produced Paul Thomas Anderson's One Battle After Another with Anderson and Adam Somner (who died ten months before the film's release), for which she won the Gotham Independent Film Award for Best Feature, the BAFTA Award for Best Film and the Academy Award for Best Picture.

== Filmography ==
=== Producer ===
==== Film ====
Year	Title	Director	Notes
2010	Jack Goes Boating	Philip Seymour Hoffman	Associate producer
2014	Land Ho	Martha Stephens; Aaron Katz	
2016	Morris from America	Chad Hartigan	
2016	Hunter Gatherer	Josh Locy	
2017	Person to Person	Dustin Guy Defa	
2017	Gemini	Aaron Katz	
2018	The Mountain	Rick Alverson	
2018	If Beale Street Could Talk	Barry Jenkins	
2018	The Amaranth	Albert Chi	
2019	Anima	Paul Thomas Anderson	Short film
2020	Never Rarely Sometimes Always	Eliza Hittman	
2021	Licorice Pizza	Paul Thomas Anderson	
2023	Mother, Couch	Niclas Larsson	
2025	If I Had Legs I'd Kick You	Mary Bronstein	
2025	The History of Sound	Oliver Hermanus	
2025	One Battle After Another	Paul Thomas Anderson	

==== Music videos ====
Year	Title	Artist	Director
2015	"Sapokanikan"	Joanna Newsom	Paul Thomas Anderson
2016	"Daydreaming"	Radiohead	Paul Thomas Anderson
2019	"Now I'm in It"	Haim	Paul Thomas Anderson
2023	"Wall of Eyes"	The Smile	Paul Thomas Anderson

== Awards and nominations ==
Award	Year	Work	Category	Result	Ref.
AACTA International Awards	2022	Best Film	Licorice Pizza	Nominated	
Academy Awards	2022	Best Picture	Licorice Pizza	Nominated	
Academy Awards	2026	Best Picture	One Battle After Another	Won	
British Academy Film Awards	2022	Best Film	Licorice Pizza	Nominated	
British Academy Film Awards	2026	Best Film	One Battle After Another	Won	
British Independent Film Awards	2021	Best International Independent Film	Never Rarely Sometimes Always	Nominated	
Film Independent Spirit Awards	2014	Independent Spirit John Cassavetes Award	Land Ho!	Won	
Film Independent Spirit Awards	2019	Best Feature	If Beale Street Could Talk	Won	
Film Independent Spirit Awards	2021	Best Feature	Never Rarely Sometimes Always	Nominated	
Gotham Awards	2021	Best Feature	Never Rarely Sometimes Always	Nominated	
Gotham Awards	2025	Best Feature	One Battle After Another	Won	
Gotham Awards	2025	Best Feature	If I Had Legs I'd Kick You	Nominated	
Grammy Awards	2020	Best Music Film	Anima	Nominated	
Producers Guild of America Awards	2022	Best Theatrical Motion Picture	Licorice Pizza	Nominated	
Producers Guild of America Awards	2026	Best Theatrical Motion Picture	One Battle After Another	Won	
