= Sam Zajac =

English ice hockey player

- Born: 23 June 1989 (age 36) Whitley Bay, England
- Height: 5 ft 7 in (170 cm)
- Weight: 175 lb (79 kg; 12 st 7 lb)
- Position: Defence
- NIHL team Former teams: Leeds Knights; Whitley Warriors; Telford Tigers; Basingstoke Bison; Newcastle Vipers; Braehead Clan; Swindon Wildcats; Manchester Storm
- Playing career: 2005–present

Sam Zajac (born 23 June 1989) is an English professional ice hockey defenceman currently playing for the Leeds Knights of the National Ice Hockey League. He spent the 2019–20 season as player/coach of Leeds.
