= Pilgrim Song =

- Theatrical release poster
- Directed by: Martha Stephens
- Written by: Martha Stephens; Karrie Crouse
- Produced by: Martha Stephens; Karrie Crouse; Nick Case; Ryan Watt; Adam Wyatt Tate
- Starring: Timothy Morton; Bryan Marshall; Karrie Crouse; Harrison Cole; Michael Abbott Jr.
- Cinematography: Alexander Sablow
- Edited by: Nathan Whiteside
- Production company: Paper Moon Films
- Distributed by: Brink
- Release dates: March 10, 2012 (SXSW); May 10, 2013 (United States)
- Running time: 116 minutes
- Country: United States
- Language: English

Pilgrim Song is a 2012 mumblecore drama film, directed by Martha Stephens, from a screenplay by Stephens, and Karrie Crouse. It stars Timothy Morton, Bryan Marshall, Karrie Crouse, Harrison Cole and Michael Abbott Jr.

The film had its world premiere at South by Southwest on March 10, 2012. It was released in a limited release on May 10, 2013, by Brink.

== Plot ==
James, a music teacher, plans on hiking Kentucky's arduous Sheltowee Trace Trail, leaving his girlfriend Joan behind, he sets out on a two-month journey in hopes of discovering himself.

== Cast ==
- Timothy Morton as James
- Bryan Marshall as Lyman
- Karrie Crouse as Joan
- Harrison Cole as Bo
- Michael Abbott Jr as Pharmer
- Kristin Slaysman as Rae

== Release ==
The film had its world premiere at South by Southwest on March 10, 2012. Shortly after, Brink acquired distribution rights to the film. It was released in a limited release on May 10, 2013.

== Critical reception ==
Pilgrim Song received negative reviews from film critics. It holds a 33% approval rating on review aggregator website Rotten Tomatoes, based on 6 reviews, with a weighted average of 5.4/10. On Metacritic, the film holds a rating of 30 out of 100, based on 4 critics, indicating "generally unfavorable reviews".
