= List of accolades received by One Battle After Another =

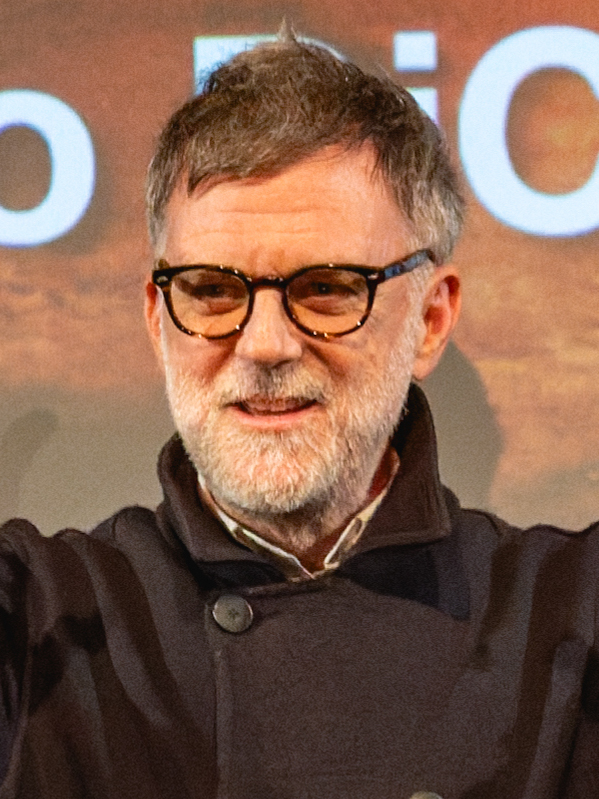
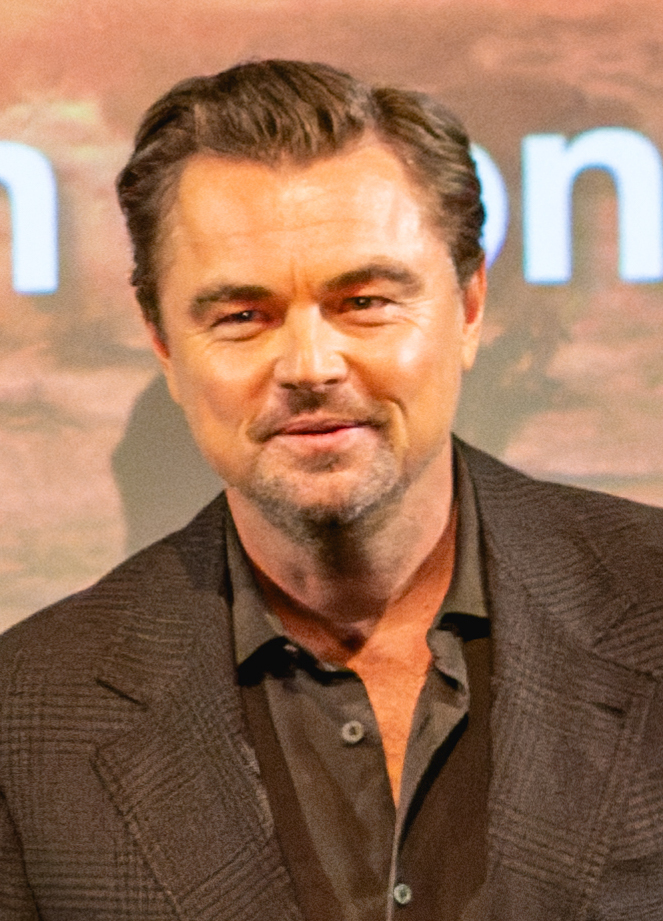
- From left to right: Paul Thomas Anderson received numerous accolades for his direction and screenplay, while the ensemble cast, led by Leonardo DiCaprio, also received accolades.
Accolades
Award	Wins	Nominations
AACTA International Awards	2	7
AARP Movies for Grownups Awards	3	8
Academy Awards	6	13
Actor Awards	1	7
African-American Film Critics Association	1	1
Alliance of Women Film Journalists	3	14
American Cinema Editors Awards	1	1
American Cinematheque Tribute to the Crafts Awards	1	1
American Film Institute Awards	1	1
American Society of Cinematographers	1	1
Art Directors Guild Awards	1	1
Astra Film and Creative Arts Awards	4	17
Austin Film Critics Association	5	13
BET Awards	0	1
Black Reel Awards	0	4
Boston Online Film Critics Association	4	4
Boston Society of Film Critics	1	1
British Academy Film Awards	6	14
British Society of Cinematographers	1	1
Capri Hollywood International Film Festival	3	3
CEC Awards	0	1
Celebration of Cinema and Television	1	1
César Awards	1	1
Chicago Film Critics Association	9	12
Cinema Audio Society Awards	0	1
Cinema for Peace Awards	0	1
Costume Designers Guild Awards	1	1
Critics' Choice Awards	3	14
Dallas–Fort Worth Film Critics Association	8	8
David di Donatello Awards	1	1
Directors Guild of America Awards	1	1
Dorian Awards	0	9
Dublin Film Critics' Circle	5	5
Florida Film Critics Circle	8	12
Georgia Film Critics Association	6	12
Golden Globes	4	9
Golden Reel Awards	0	3
Golden Tomato Awards	1	2
Golden Trailer Awards	4	7
Gotham Awards	1	6
Guild of Music Supervisors Awards	1	1
Hollywood Music in Media Awards	0	1
Houston Film Critics Society	0	13
IndieWire Honors	1	1
International Cinephile Society	2	12
International Federation of Film Critics	1	1
International Film Music Critics Association	0	1
Irish Film & Television Awards	1	6
Japan Academy Film Prize	0	1
Kansas City Film Critics Circle	5	9
Las Vegas Film Critics Society	4	11
Location Managers Guild International Awards	1	1
London Film Critics' Circle	4	9
Los Angeles Film Critics Association	4	4
MacGuffin Awards	1	1
Mainichi Film Awards	1	1
Make-Up Artists & Hair Stylists Guild	2	3
NAACP Image Awards	0	3
National Board of Review	5	5
National Society of Film Critics	5	5
New York Film Critics Circle	2	2
New York Film Critics Online	4	12
Online Film Critics Society	5	13
Palm Springs International Film Festival	1	1
Phoenix Film Critics Society	9	9
Producers Guild of America Awards	1	1
Robert Awards	1	1
San Diego Film Critics Society	5	11
San Francisco Bay Area Film Critics Circle	7	11
Santa Barbara International Film Festival	6	6
Satellite Awards	3	12
Saturn Awards	0	1
SCAD Savannah Film Festival	2	2
Screen Awards	3	8
Seattle Film Critics Society	8	12
Set Decorators Society of America	2	2
Society of Camera Operators	1	1
Society of Composers & Lyricists	0	1
Southeastern Film Critics Association	9	9
St. Louis Film Critics Association	9	15
Toronto Film Critics Association	7	7
USC Scripter Awards	1	1
Vancouver Film Critics Circle	2	7
Variety Creative Impact Awards	1	1
Washington D.C. Area Film Critics Association	3	13
Webby Awards	0	1
Women Film Critics Circle	2	2
World Soundtrack Awards	0	1
Writers Guild of America Awards	1	1

Totals (Note: Certain award groups do not simply award one winner. They acknowledge several different recipients, have runners-up, and have third place. Since this is a specific recognition and is different from losing an award, runner-up mentions are considered wins in this award tally. For simplification and to avoid errors, each award in this list has been presumed to have had a prior nomination.)
- Wins: 235
- Nominations: 474

One Battle After Another is a 2025 American action-comedy-thriller film (Note: Attributed to multiple references:) that garnered numerous awards and nominations in a wide assortment of categories, with recognition for its direction, screenplay, performances, cinematography, editing, score and sound design, among others. The film is written, directed, and co-produced by Paul Thomas Anderson, starring Leonardo DiCaprio, Sean Penn, Benicio del Toro, Regina Hall, Teyana Taylor, and Chase Infiniti. Loosely based on and inspired by Thomas Pynchon's novel Vineland (1990), it follows a group of ex-revolutionaries who reunite to rescue the daughter of one of their own when their enemy resurfaces after sixteen years.

The film had its premiere at the TCL Chinese Theatre in Los Angeles on September 8, 2025, and was released in the United States by Warner Bros. Pictures on September 26. It received critical acclaim and grossed over $200 million worldwide, becoming Anderson's highest-grossing film.

At the 31st Critics' Choice Awards, it won three awards, including Best Picture and Best Director. It was also nominated for nine awards at the 83rd Golden Globes, receiving the most nominations of any film that year and winning four, including Best Motion Picture – Musical or Comedy. The film also became the most-nominated film in the history of the Screen Actors Guild at the 32nd Actor Awards, with a record-breaking seven nominations and winning one. At the 79th British Academy Film Awards, it led the nominations with fourteen overall, winning six, including Best Film and Best Director.

Furthermore, the film received thirteen nominations at the 98th Academy Awards, including Best Picture, Best Director, Best Adapted Screenplay and four acting nominations (for del Toro, DiCaprio, Penn, and Taylor), the second-most of any film that year, winning six: Best Picture, Best Director, Best Supporting Actor (Penn), Best Adapted Screenplay, Best Casting, and Best Film Editing.

== Accolades ==
Award	Date of ceremony	Category	Recipient(s)	Result	Ref.
AACTA International Awards	February 6, 2026	Best Film	One Battle After Another	Won	
AACTA International Awards	February 6, 2026	Best Direction	Paul Thomas Anderson	Won	
AACTA International Awards	February 6, 2026	Best Actor	Leonardo DiCaprio	Nominated	
AACTA International Awards	February 6, 2026	Best Actress	Chase Infiniti	Nominated	
AACTA International Awards	February 6, 2026	Best Supporting Actor	Benicio del Toro	Nominated	
AACTA International Awards	February 6, 2026	Best Supporting Actor	Sean Penn	Nominated	
AACTA International Awards	February 6, 2026	Best Screenplay	Paul Thomas Anderson	Nominated	
AARP Movies for Grownups Awards	January 10, 2026	Best Picture	One Battle After Another	Nominated	
AARP Movies for Grownups Awards	January 10, 2026	Best Director	Paul Thomas Anderson	Nominated	
AARP Movies for Grownups Awards	January 10, 2026	Best Actor	Leonardo DiCaprio	Nominated	
AARP Movies for Grownups Awards	January 10, 2026	Best Supporting Actor	Benicio del Toro	Nominated	
AARP Movies for Grownups Awards	January 10, 2026	Best Supporting Actor	Sean Penn	Nominated	
AARP Movies for Grownups Awards	January 10, 2026	Best Supporting Actress	Regina Hall	Won	
AARP Movies for Grownups Awards	January 10, 2026	Best Screenwriter	Paul Thomas Anderson	Won	
AARP Movies for Grownups Awards	January 10, 2026	Best Ensemble	One Battle After Another	Won	
Academy Awards	March 15, 2026	Best Picture	Adam Somner, (Note: Adam Somner became the second producer, following Sam Zimbalist (for 1959's Ben-Hur), to win posthumously for Best Picture) Sara Murphy, and Paul Thomas Anderson	Won	
Academy Awards	March 15, 2026	Best Director	Paul Thomas Anderson	Won	
Academy Awards	March 15, 2026	Best Actor	Leonardo DiCaprio	Nominated	
Academy Awards	March 15, 2026	Best Supporting Actor	Benicio del Toro	Nominated	
Academy Awards	March 15, 2026	Best Supporting Actor	Sean Penn	Won	
Academy Awards	March 15, 2026	Best Supporting Actress	Teyana Taylor	Nominated	
Academy Awards	March 15, 2026	Best Adapted Screenplay	Paul Thomas Anderson	Won	
Academy Awards	March 15, 2026	Best Casting	Cassandra Kulukundis	Won	
Academy Awards	March 15, 2026	Best Cinematography	Michael Bauman	Nominated	
Academy Awards	March 15, 2026	Best Film Editing	Andy Jurgensen	Won	
Academy Awards	March 15, 2026	Best Original Score	Jonny Greenwood	Nominated	
Academy Awards	March 15, 2026	Best Production Design	Anthony Carlino and Florencia Martin	Nominated	
Academy Awards	March 15, 2026	Best Sound	José Antonio García, Christopher Scarabosio, and Tony Villaflor	Nominated	
Actor Awards	March 1, 2026	Outstanding Performance by a Cast in a Motion Picture	Benicio del Toro, Leonardo DiCaprio, Regina Hall, Chase Infiniti, Sean Penn, and Teyana Taylor	Nominated	
Actor Awards	March 1, 2026	Outstanding Performance by a Male Actor in a Leading Role	Leonardo DiCaprio	Nominated	
Actor Awards	March 1, 2026	Outstanding Performance by a Female Actor in a Leading Role	Chase Infiniti	Nominated	
Actor Awards	March 1, 2026	Outstanding Performance by a Male Actor in a Supporting Role	Benicio del Toro	Nominated	
Actor Awards	March 1, 2026	Outstanding Performance by a Male Actor in a Supporting Role	Sean Penn	Won	
Actor Awards	March 1, 2026	Outstanding Performance by a Female Actor in a Supporting Role	Teyana Taylor	Nominated	
Actor Awards	March 1, 2026	Outstanding Action Performance by a Stunt Ensemble in a Motion Picture	Various (Note: Didi Alaoui, David Alarcon, Joey Anaya, Brian Avery, Rick Avery, Samuel Baca, Cody Banta, David Barrett, Morgan Benoit, Matt Berberi, Hannah Betts, Freddy Bouciegues, Eddie Braun, Kamy D. Bruder, Richard Burden, Keith Campbell, Troy Castaneda, Doug Coleman, Eliza Coleman, Whitney Coleman, Tim Connolly, Cassie Jo Craig, Clay Cullen, Steve DeCastro, Lisa Dempsey, Julius Denem, Ryan Devita-Loayza, Alyma Dorsey, Danny Downey, Shauna Duggins, Zack Duhame, Paul Eliopoulos, Richard Epper, Corey Eubanks, Brent Fletcher, Tanner Foust, Jeremy Fry, Brenda Lorena Garcia, Jeff Garrido, Kristopher Giacomazzi, Mickey Giacomazzi, Levi Gilbert, Andy Gill, Jack Gill, Mark Ginther, Chad Guerrero, Scott Howell, David Hutchison, Collin Hymes, Jobie James, Adam Jeffrey, Craig Johnson, Brett A. Jones, Horace Knight Jr., Oakley Lehman, Colby Lemmo, Bethany Levy, Wally Lozano, Brian Machleit, Cina McKenna, Mark Meloro Jr., Angela Meryl, Skyler Millicano, Rene Mousseux, Kimberly Shannon Murphy, Robert Nagle, Chau Naumova, Chris O'Hara, Casey O'Neill, David Paul Olsen, Whitney Ortega, Allan Padelford, Chris Palermo, Clarrel Pope, Ming Qiu, Rex Reddick, Tim Rigby, Gabriel Rios, Gilbert Rosales, Trenton Rostedt, Brian Sampson, Benjamin Sanchez, Todd Schneider, Erik Solky, Erik Stabenau, Daniel Stevens, Jake Swallow, Danny Swanson, Bobby Talbert, Mallory Thompson, Charlotte Townsend, Steve Upton, Tony Vittorioso, Torrey Vogel, Webster P. Whinery Jr., Jim Wilkey, Johanna Wong, and Nico Woulard)	Nominated	
African-American Film Critics Association	December 9, 2025	Top 10 Films of the Year	One Battle After Another	2nd place	
African-American Film Critics Association	December 9, 2025	Emerging Face (Actress)	Chase Infiniti	Won	
Alliance of Women Film Journalists	December 31, 2025	Best Film	One Battle After Another	Nominated	
Alliance of Women Film Journalists	December 31, 2025	Best Director	Paul Thomas Anderson	Nominated	
Alliance of Women Film Journalists	December 31, 2025	Best Actor	Leonardo DiCaprio	Nominated	
Alliance of Women Film Journalists	December 31, 2025	Best Supporting Actor	Benicio del Toro	Nominated	
Alliance of Women Film Journalists	December 31, 2025	Best Supporting Actor	Sean Penn	Nominated	
Alliance of Women Film Journalists	December 31, 2025	Best Supporting Actress	Teyana Taylor	Nominated	
Alliance of Women Film Journalists	December 31, 2025	Best Adapted Screenplay	Paul Thomas Anderson	Nominated	
Alliance of Women Film Journalists	December 31, 2025	Best Ensemble Cast & Casting Director	Cassandra Kulukundis	Nominated	
Alliance of Women Film Journalists	December 31, 2025	Best Cinematography	Michael Bauman	Nominated	
Alliance of Women Film Journalists	December 31, 2025	Best Editing	Andy Jurgensen	Won	
Alliance of Women Film Journalists	December 31, 2025	Female Focus: Best Breakthrough Performance	Chase Infiniti	Won	
Alliance of Women Film Journalists	December 31, 2025	Female Focus: Best Breakthrough Performance	Teyana Taylor	Nominated	
Alliance of Women Film Journalists	December 31, 2025	Female Focus: Best Stunts Performance	Chase Infiniti	Won	
Alliance of Women Film Journalists	December 31, 2025	Female Focus: Best Stunts Performance	Teyana Taylor	Nominated	
American Cinema Editors Awards	February 27, 2026	Best Edited Feature Film (Comedy, Theatrical)	Andy Jurgensen	Won	
American Cinematheque Tribute to the Crafts Awards	January 16, 2026	Editing	Andy Jurgensen	Honored	
American Film Institute Awards	December 4, 2025	Top 10 Films of the Year	One Battle After Another	Won (Note: This award does not have a single winner, but recognizes multiple films.)	
American Society of Cinematographers	March 8, 2026	Theatrical Feature Film	Michael Bauman	Won	
Art Directors Guild Awards	February 28, 2026	Contemporary Feature Film	Florencia Martin	Won	
Astra Film Awards	January 9, 2026	Best Picture – Comedy or Musical	One Battle After Another	Won	
Astra Film Awards	January 9, 2026	Best Director	Paul Thomas Anderson	Nominated	
Astra Film Awards	January 9, 2026	Best Actor – Comedy or Musical	Leonardo DiCaprio	Nominated	
Astra Film Awards	January 9, 2026	Best Actress – Comedy or Musical	Chase Infiniti	Nominated	
Astra Film Awards	January 9, 2026	Best Supporting Actor – Comedy or Musical	Benicio del Toro	Nominated	
Astra Film Awards	January 9, 2026	Best Supporting Actor – Comedy or Musical	Sean Penn	Nominated	
Astra Film Awards	January 9, 2026	Best Supporting Actress – Comedy or Musical	Regina Hall	Nominated	
Astra Film Awards	January 9, 2026	Best Supporting Actress – Comedy or Musical	Teyana Taylor	Nominated	
Astra Film Awards	January 9, 2026	Best Adapted Screenplay	Paul Thomas Anderson	Won	
Astra Film Awards	January 9, 2026	Best Cast Ensemble	One Battle After Another	Nominated	
Astra Film Awards	January 9, 2026	Best Original Score	Jonny Greenwood	Nominated	
Astra Film Awards	December 11, 2025	Best Casting	Cassandra Kulukundis	Nominated	
Astra Film Awards	December 11, 2025	Best Cinematography	Michael Bauman	Nominated	
Astra Film Awards	December 11, 2025	Best Film Editing	Andy Jurgensen	Won	
Astra Film Awards	December 11, 2025	Best Sound	José Antonio García, Christopher Scarabosio, and Tony Villaflor	Nominated	
Astra Film Awards	December 11, 2025	Best Stunts	One Battle After Another	Nominated	
Astra Film Awards	December 11, 2025	Best Second Unit Director	Adam Somner (Note: Posthumous award)	Won	
Austin Film Critics Association	December 18, 2025	Best Picture	One Battle After Another	Won	
Austin Film Critics Association	December 18, 2025	Best Director	Paul Thomas Anderson	Won	
Austin Film Critics Association	December 18, 2025	Best Actor	Leonardo DiCaprio	Nominated	
Austin Film Critics Association	December 18, 2025	Best Supporting Actor	Benicio del Toro	Won	
Austin Film Critics Association	December 18, 2025	Best Supporting Actor	Sean Penn	Nominated	
Austin Film Critics Association	December 18, 2025	Best Supporting Actress	Teyana Taylor	Nominated	
Austin Film Critics Association	December 18, 2025	Best Adapted Screenplay	Paul Thomas Anderson	Won	
Austin Film Critics Association	December 18, 2025	Best Ensemble	One Battle After Another	Nominated	
Austin Film Critics Association	December 18, 2025	Best Cinematography	Michael Bauman	Nominated	
Austin Film Critics Association	December 18, 2025	Best Editing	Andy Jurgensen	Won	
Austin Film Critics Association	December 18, 2025	Best Original Score	Jonny Greenwood	Nominated	
Austin Film Critics Association	December 18, 2025	Best Stunt Work	One Battle After Another	Nominated	
Austin Film Critics Association	December 18, 2025	The Robert R. "Bobby" McCurdy Memorial Breakthrough Award	Chase Infiniti	Honored (Note: Shared with four other individuals.)	
BET Awards	June 28, 2026	Best Movie	One Battle After Another	Nominated	
Black Reel Awards	February 16, 2026	Outstanding Lead Performance	Chase Infiniti	Nominated	
Black Reel Awards	February 16, 2026	Outstanding Breakthrough Performance	Chase Infiniti	Nominated	
Black Reel Awards	February 16, 2026	Outstanding Supporting Performance	Regina Hall	Nominated	
Black Reel Awards	February 16, 2026	Outstanding Supporting Performance	Teyana Taylor	Nominated	
Boston Online Film Critics Association	December 20, 2025	Top Ten Films of 2025	One Battle After Another	1st place	
Boston Online Film Critics Association	December 20, 2025	Best Director	Paul Thomas Anderson	Won	
Boston Online Film Critics Association	December 20, 2025	Best Supporting Actor	Benicio del Toro	Won	
Boston Online Film Critics Association	December 20, 2025	Best Screenplay	Paul Thomas Anderson	Won	
Boston Society of Film Critics	December 14, 2025	Best Adapted Screenplay	Paul Thomas Anderson	Won	
British Academy Film Awards	February 22, 2026	Best Film	Adam Somner, Sara Murphy, and Paul Thomas Anderson	Won	
British Academy Film Awards	February 22, 2026	Best Direction	Paul Thomas Anderson	Won	
British Academy Film Awards	February 22, 2026	Best Actor in a Leading Role	Leonardo DiCaprio	Nominated	
British Academy Film Awards	February 22, 2026	Best Actress in a Leading Role	Chase Infiniti	Nominated	
British Academy Film Awards	February 22, 2026	Best Actor in a Supporting Role	Benicio del Toro	Nominated	
British Academy Film Awards	February 22, 2026	Best Actor in a Supporting Role	Sean Penn	Won	
British Academy Film Awards	February 22, 2026	Best Actress in a Supporting Role	Teyana Taylor	Nominated	
British Academy Film Awards	February 22, 2026	Best Adapted Screenplay	Paul Thomas Anderson	Won	
British Academy Film Awards	February 22, 2026	Best Casting	Cassandra Kulukundis	Nominated	
British Academy Film Awards	February 22, 2026	Best Cinematography	Michael Bauman	Won	
British Academy Film Awards	February 22, 2026	Best Editing	Andy Jurgensen	Won	
British Academy Film Awards	February 22, 2026	Best Original Score	Jonny Greenwood	Nominated	
British Academy Film Awards	February 22, 2026	Best Production Design	Anthony Carlino and Florencia Martin	Nominated	
British Academy Film Awards	February 22, 2026	Best Sound	José Antonio García, Christopher Scarabosio, and Tony Villaflor	Nominated	
British Society of Cinematographers	February 7, 2026	Best Cinematography in a Feature Film	Michael Bauman	Won	
Capri Hollywood International Film Festival	January 2, 2026	Best Director	Paul Thomas Anderson	Honored	
Capri Hollywood International Film Festival	January 2, 2026	Best Actor	Leonardo DiCaprio	Honored	
Capri Hollywood International Film Festival	January 2, 2026	Best Supporting Actress	Teyana Taylor	Honored	
CEC Awards	February 23, 2026	Best Foreign Film	One Battle After Another	Nominated	
Celebration of Cinema and Television	December 9, 2025	Ensemble Award	Regina Hall, Chase Infiniti, and Teyana Taylor	Honored	
César Awards	February 26, 2026	Best International Film	Paul Thomas Anderson	Won	
Chicago Film Critics Association	December 11, 2025	Best Picture	One Battle After Another	Won	
Chicago Film Critics Association	December 11, 2025	Best Director	Paul Thomas Anderson	Won	
Chicago Film Critics Association	December 11, 2025	Best Actor	Leonardo DiCaprio	Nominated	
Chicago Film Critics Association	December 11, 2025	Best Supporting Actor	Benicio del Toro	Won	
Chicago Film Critics Association	December 11, 2025	Best Supporting Actor	Sean Penn	Nominated	
Chicago Film Critics Association	December 11, 2025	Best Supporting Actress	Teyana Taylor	Won	
Chicago Film Critics Association	December 11, 2025	Best Adapted Screenplay	Paul Thomas Anderson	Won	
Chicago Film Critics Association	December 11, 2025	Best Art Direction / Production Design	One Battle After Another	Nominated	
Chicago Film Critics Association	December 11, 2025	Best Cinematography	Michael Bauman	Won	
Chicago Film Critics Association	December 11, 2025	Best Editing	Andy Jurgensen	Won	
Chicago Film Critics Association	December 11, 2025	Best Original Score	Jonny Greenwood	Won	
Chicago Film Critics Association	December 11, 2025	Most Promising Performer	Chase Infiniti	Won	
Cinema Audio Society Awards	March 7, 2026	Motion Pictures – Live Action	José Antonio García, Christopher Scarabosio, Tony Villaflor, Graeme Stewart, Chelsea Body, and Kevin Schultz	Nominated	
Cinema for Peace Awards	February 16, 2026	Cinema for Peace Dove for The Most Valuable Film of the Year	One Battle After Another	Nominated	
Costume Designers Guild Awards	February 12, 2026	Excellence in Contemporary Film	Colleen Atwood	Won	
Critics' Choice Awards	January 4, 2026	Best Picture	One Battle After Another	Won	
Critics' Choice Awards	January 4, 2026	Best Director	Paul Thomas Anderson	Won	
Critics' Choice Awards	January 4, 2026	Best Actor	Leonardo DiCaprio	Nominated	
Critics' Choice Awards	January 4, 2026	Best Actress	Chase Infiniti	Nominated	
Critics' Choice Awards	January 4, 2026	Best Supporting Actor	Benicio del Toro	Nominated	
Critics' Choice Awards	January 4, 2026	Best Supporting Actor	Sean Penn	Nominated	
Critics' Choice Awards	January 4, 2026	Best Supporting Actress	Teyana Taylor	Nominated	
Critics' Choice Awards	January 4, 2026	Best Adapted Screenplay	Paul Thomas Anderson	Won	
Critics' Choice Awards	January 4, 2026	Best Casting and Ensemble	Cassandra Kulukundis	Nominated	
Critics' Choice Awards	January 4, 2026	Best Cinematography	Michael Bauman	Nominated	
Critics' Choice Awards	January 4, 2026	Best Editing	Andy Jurgensen	Nominated	
Critics' Choice Awards	January 4, 2026	Best Score	Jonny Greenwood	Nominated	
Critics' Choice Awards	January 4, 2026	Best Sound	José Antonio García, Christopher Scarabosio, and Tony Villaflor	Nominated	
Critics' Choice Awards	January 4, 2026	Best Stunt Design	Brian Machleit	Nominated	
Dallas–Fort Worth Film Critics Association	December 17, 2025	Best Picture	One Battle After Another	Won	
Dallas–Fort Worth Film Critics Association	December 17, 2025	Best Director	Paul Thomas Anderson	Won	
Dallas–Fort Worth Film Critics Association	December 17, 2025	Best Actor	Leonardo DiCaprio	Won	
Dallas–Fort Worth Film Critics Association	December 17, 2025	Best Actress	Chase Infiniti	5th place	
Dallas–Fort Worth Film Critics Association	December 17, 2025	Best Supporting Actor	Benicio del Toro	2nd place	
Dallas–Fort Worth Film Critics Association	December 17, 2025	Best Supporting Actor	Sean Penn	3rd place	
Dallas–Fort Worth Film Critics Association	December 17, 2025	Best Supporting Actress	Teyana Taylor	Won	
Dallas–Fort Worth Film Critics Association	December 17, 2025	Best Screenplay	Paul Thomas Anderson	Won	
David di Donatello Awards	May 6, 2026	Best International Film	One Battle After Another	Won	
Directors Guild of America Awards	February 7, 2026	Outstanding Directorial Achievement in Theatrical Feature Film	Paul Thomas Anderson	Won	
Dorian Awards	March 3, 2026	Film of the Year	One Battle After Another	Nominated	
Dorian Awards	March 3, 2026	Director of the Year	Paul Thomas Anderson	Nominated	
Dorian Awards	March 3, 2026	Screenplay of the Year (Original or Adapted)	Paul Thomas Anderson	Nominated	
Dorian Awards	March 3, 2026	Lead Film Performance of the Year	Leonardo DiCaprio	Nominated	
Dorian Awards	March 3, 2026	Supporting Film Performance of the Year	Benicio del Toro	Nominated	
Dorian Awards	March 3, 2026	Supporting Film Performance of the Year	Sean Penn	Nominated	
Dorian Awards	March 3, 2026	Supporting Film Performance of the Year	Teyana Taylor	Nominated	
Dorian Awards	March 3, 2026	Film Music of the Year	Jonny Greenwood	Nominated	
Dorian Awards	March 3, 2026	Visually Striking Film of the Year	One Battle After Another	Nominated	
Dublin Film Critics' Circle	December 18, 2025	Best Film	One Battle After Another	2nd place	
Dublin Film Critics' Circle	December 18, 2025	Best Director	Paul Thomas Anderson	2nd place	
Dublin Film Critics' Circle	December 18, 2025	Best Actor	Leonardo DiCaprio	2nd place	
Dublin Film Critics' Circle	December 18, 2025	Best Screenplay	Paul Thomas Anderson	2nd place	
Dublin Film Critics' Circle	December 18, 2025	Best Cinematography	Michael Bauman	5th place	
Florida Film Critics Circle	December 19, 2025	Best Picture	One Battle After Another	Won	
Florida Film Critics Circle	December 19, 2025	Best Director	Paul Thomas Anderson	Runner-up	
Florida Film Critics Circle	December 19, 2025	Best Actor	Leonardo DiCaprio	Nominated	
Florida Film Critics Circle	December 19, 2025	Best Supporting Actor	Benicio del Toro	Nominated	
Florida Film Critics Circle	December 19, 2025	Best Supporting Actor	Sean Penn	Won	
Florida Film Critics Circle	December 19, 2025	Best Supporting Actress	Teyana Taylor	Won	
Florida Film Critics Circle	December 19, 2025	Best Adapted Screenplay	Paul Thomas Anderson	Won	
Florida Film Critics Circle	December 19, 2025	Best Ensemble	One Battle After Another	Runner-up	
Florida Film Critics Circle	December 19, 2025	Best Cinematography	Michael Bauman	Nominated	
Florida Film Critics Circle	December 19, 2025	Best Editing	Andy Jurgensen	Won	
Florida Film Critics Circle	December 19, 2025	Best Original Score	Jonny Greenwood	Nominated	
Florida Film Critics Circle	December 19, 2025	Pauline Kael Breakout Award	Chase Infiniti	Won	
Georgia Film Critics Association	December 27, 2025	Best Picture	One Battle After Another	Won	
Georgia Film Critics Association	December 27, 2025	Best Director	Paul Thomas Anderson	Won	
Georgia Film Critics Association	December 27, 2025	Best Actor	Leonardo DiCaprio	Nominated	
Georgia Film Critics Association	December 27, 2025	Best Actress	Chase Infiniti	Nominated	
Georgia Film Critics Association	December 27, 2025	Best Supporting Actor	Benicio del Toro	Won	
Georgia Film Critics Association	December 27, 2025	Best Supporting Actor	Sean Penn	Nominated	
Georgia Film Critics Association	December 27, 2025	Best Supporting Actress	Regina Hall	Runner-up	
Georgia Film Critics Association	December 27, 2025	Best Supporting Actress	Teyana Taylor	Nominated	
Georgia Film Critics Association	December 27, 2025	Best Adapted Screenplay	Paul Thomas Anderson	Won	
Georgia Film Critics Association	December 27, 2025	Best Ensemble	One Battle After Another	Won	
Georgia Film Critics Association	December 27, 2025	Best Cinematography	Michael Bauman	Nominated	
Georgia Film Critics Association	December 27, 2025	Best Original Score	Jonny Greenwood	Nominated	
Golden Globes	January 11, 2026	Best Motion Picture – Musical or Comedy	One Battle After Another	Won	
Golden Globes	January 11, 2026	Best Director	Paul Thomas Anderson	Won	
Golden Globes	January 11, 2026	Best Actor – Musical or Comedy	Leonardo DiCaprio	Nominated	
Golden Globes	January 11, 2026	Best Actress – Musical or Comedy	Chase Infiniti	Nominated	
Golden Globes	January 11, 2026	Best Supporting Actor – Motion Picture	Benicio del Toro	Nominated	
Golden Globes	January 11, 2026	Best Supporting Actor – Motion Picture	Sean Penn	Nominated	
Golden Globes	January 11, 2026	Best Supporting Actress – Motion Picture	Teyana Taylor	Won	
Golden Globes	January 11, 2026	Best Screenplay	Paul Thomas Anderson	Won	
Golden Globes	January 11, 2026	Best Original Score	Jonny Greenwood	Nominated	
Golden Reel Awards	March 8, 2026	Outstanding Achievement in Sound Editing – Feature Dialogue / ADR	Christopher Scarabosio and Richard Quinn	Nominated	
Golden Reel Awards	March 8, 2026	Outstanding Achievement in Sound Editing – Feature Effects / Foley	Christopher Scarabosio, Justin Doyle, Jeremy Molod, Steve Hammond, and Goro Koyama	Nominated	
Golden Reel Awards	March 8, 2026	Outstanding Achievement in Music Editing – Feature Motion Picture	Graeme Stewart	Nominated	
Golden Tomato Awards	January 13, 2026	Best Movies	One Battle After Another	Nominated	
Golden Tomato Awards	January 13, 2026	Best Action & Adventure Movies	One Battle After Another	Won	
Golden Trailer Awards	May 29, 2025	Best Original Score	"Rise & Shine" (Warner Bros. / Major Major)	Won	
Golden Trailer Awards	May 28, 2026	Best Action TV Spot	"Pursuit" (Warner Bros. / MOCEAN)	Won	
Golden Trailer Awards	May 28, 2026	Best Comedy TV Spot	"Offense" (Warner Bros. / MOCEAN)	Won	
Golden Trailer Awards	May 28, 2026	Best Drama	"Fight Safe" (Warner Bros. / AV Squad)	Nominated	
Golden Trailer Awards	May 28, 2026	Best Music	"Fight Safe" (Warner Bros. / AV Squad)	Nominated	
Golden Trailer Awards	May 28, 2026	Best Viral Campaign for a Feature Film	Digital Campaign (Warner Bros. / X/AV)	Won	
Golden Trailer Awards	May 28, 2026	Most Original TV Spot	"Big Picture" (Warner Bros. / MOCEAN)	Nominated	
Gotham Awards	December 1, 2025	Best Feature	Paul Thomas Anderson, Sara Murphy, and Adam Somner	Won	
Gotham Awards	December 1, 2025	Best Director	Paul Thomas Anderson	Nominated	
Gotham Awards	December 1, 2025	Best Adapted Screenplay	Paul Thomas Anderson	Nominated	
Gotham Awards	December 1, 2025	Outstanding Supporting Performance	Benicio del Toro	Nominated	
Gotham Awards	December 1, 2025	Outstanding Supporting Performance	Teyana Taylor	Nominated	
Gotham Awards	December 1, 2025	Breakthrough Performer	Chase Infiniti	Nominated	
Grammy Awards	February 7, 2027	Best Score Soundtrack for Visual Media	Jonny Greenwood	Pending	
Guild of Music Supervisors Awards	February 28, 2026	Best Music Supervision in a Trailer (Film)	Adam Konger, Sanaz Lavaedian, and Marina Polites ("One Battle After Another – Official Trailer 2")	Won	
Hollywood Music in Media Awards	November 19, 2025	Best Original Score – Feature Film	Jonny Greenwood	Nominated	
Houston Film Critics Society	January 20, 2026	Best Picture	One Battle After Another	Nominated	
Houston Film Critics Society	January 20, 2026	Best Director	Paul Thomas Anderson	Nominated	
Houston Film Critics Society	January 20, 2026	Best Actor	Leonardo DiCaprio	Nominated	
Houston Film Critics Society	January 20, 2026	Best Actress	Chase Infiniti	Nominated	
Houston Film Critics Society	January 20, 2026	Best Supporting Actor	Benicio del Toro	Nominated	
Houston Film Critics Society	January 20, 2026	Best Supporting Actor	Sean Penn	Nominated	
Houston Film Critics Society	January 20, 2026	Best Supporting Actress	Teyana Taylor	Nominated	
Houston Film Critics Society	January 20, 2026	Best Screenplay	Paul Thomas Anderson	Nominated	
Houston Film Critics Society	January 20, 2026	Best Casting	Cassandra Kulukundis	Nominated	
Houston Film Critics Society	January 20, 2026	Best Ensemble	One Battle After Another	Nominated	
Houston Film Critics Society	January 20, 2026	Best Cinematography	Michael Bauman	Nominated	
Houston Film Critics Society	January 20, 2026	Best Original Score	Jonny Greenwood	Nominated	
Houston Film Critics Society	January 20, 2026	Best Stunt Coordination Team	One Battle After Another	Nominated	
IndieWire Honors	December 4, 2025	Breakthrough Award	Chase Infiniti	Honored	
International Cinephile Society	February 8, 2026	Best Picture	One Battle After Another	8th place	
International Cinephile Society	February 8, 2026	Best Director	Paul Thomas Anderson	Nominated	
International Cinephile Society	February 8, 2026	Best Supporting Actor	Benicio del Toro	Nominated	
International Cinephile Society	February 8, 2026	Best Supporting Actor	Sean Penn	Nominated	
International Cinephile Society	February 8, 2026	Best Supporting Actress	Teyana Taylor	Nominated	
International Cinephile Society	February 8, 2026	Best Adapted Screenplay	Paul Thomas Anderson	Runner-up	
International Cinephile Society	February 8, 2026	Best Ensemble	One Battle After Another	Nominated	
International Cinephile Society	February 8, 2026	Best Cinematography	Michael Bauman	Nominated	
International Cinephile Society	February 8, 2026	Best Editing	Andy Jurgensen	Nominated	
International Cinephile Society	February 8, 2026	Best Score	Jonny Greenwood	Nominated	
International Cinephile Society	February 8, 2026	Best Sound Design	Christopher Scarabosio	Nominated	
International Cinephile Society	February 8, 2026	Best Breakthrough Performance	Chase Infiniti	Nominated	
International Federation of Film Critics	September 18, 2026	FIPRESCI Grand Prix	One Battle After Another	Honored	
International Film Music Critics Association	February 26, 2026	Best Original Score for an Action/Adventure Film	Jonny Greenwood	Nominated	
Irish Film & Television Awards	February 20, 2026	Best International Film	One Battle After Another	Nominated	
Irish Film & Television Awards	February 20, 2026	Best International Actor	Leonardo DiCaprio	Won	
Irish Film & Television Awards	February 20, 2026	Best International Actor	Sean Penn	Nominated	
Irish Film & Television Awards	February 20, 2026	Best International Actress	Chase Infiniti	Nominated	
Irish Film & Television Awards	February 20, 2026	Best International Actress	Teyana Taylor	Nominated	
Irish Film & Television Awards	February 20, 2026	Best VFX	Ed Bruce and Amrei Bronnenmayer	Nominated	
Japan Academy Film Prize	March 13, 2026	Excellent Foreign Work	One Battle After Another	Nominated	
Kansas City Film Critics Circle	December 21, 2025	Best Film	One Battle After Another	Won	
Kansas City Film Critics Circle	December 21, 2025	Best Director	Paul Thomas Anderson	Won	
Kansas City Film Critics Circle	December 21, 2025	Best Actor	Leonardo DiCaprio	Nominated	
Kansas City Film Critics Circle	December 21, 2025	Best Supporting Actor	Benicio del Toro	Nominated	
Kansas City Film Critics Circle	December 21, 2025	Best Supporting Actor	Sean Penn	Won	
Kansas City Film Critics Circle	December 21, 2025	Best Supporting Actress	Teyana Taylor	Nominated	
Kansas City Film Critics Circle	December 21, 2025	Best Adapted Screenplay	Paul Thomas Anderson	Won	
Kansas City Film Critics Circle	December 21, 2025	Best Cinematography	Michael Bauman	Won	
Kansas City Film Critics Circle	December 21, 2025	Best Original Score	Jonny Greenwood	Nominated	
Las Vegas Film Critics Society	December 19, 2025	Best Picture	One Battle After Another	Won	
Las Vegas Film Critics Society	December 19, 2025	Best Director	Paul Thomas Anderson	Won	
Las Vegas Film Critics Society	December 19, 2025	Best Actor	Leonardo DiCaprio	Nominated	
Las Vegas Film Critics Society	December 19, 2025	Best Supporting Actor	Benicio del Toro	Nominated	
Las Vegas Film Critics Society	December 19, 2025	Best Supporting Actor	Sean Penn	Nominated	
Las Vegas Film Critics Society	December 19, 2025	Best Supporting Actress	Teyana Taylor	Nominated	
Las Vegas Film Critics Society	December 19, 2025	Best Adapted Screenplay	Paul Thomas Anderson	Won	
Las Vegas Film Critics Society	December 19, 2025	Best Ensemble	One Battle After Another	Won	
Las Vegas Film Critics Society	December 19, 2025	Best Cinematography	Michael Bauman	Nominated	
Las Vegas Film Critics Society	December 19, 2025	Best Film Editing	Andy Jurgensen	Nominated	
Las Vegas Film Critics Society	December 19, 2025	Best Score	Jonny Greenwood	Nominated	
Location Managers Guild International Awards	August 22, 2026	Outstanding Locations in a Contemporary Feature Film	Michael Glaser, Rich Heichel, and Michael Wesley	Won	
London Film Critics' Circle	February 1, 2026	Film of the Year	One Battle After Another	Won	
London Film Critics' Circle	February 1, 2026	Director of the Year	Paul Thomas Anderson	Won	
London Film Critics' Circle	February 1, 2026	Actor of the Year	Leonardo DiCaprio	Nominated	
London Film Critics' Circle	February 1, 2026	Supporting Actor of the Year	Benicio del Toro	Nominated	
London Film Critics' Circle	February 1, 2026	Supporting Actor of the Year	Sean Penn	Won	
London Film Critics' Circle	February 1, 2026	Supporting Actress of the Year	Teyana Taylor	Nominated	
London Film Critics' Circle	February 1, 2026	Screenwriter of the Year	Paul Thomas Anderson	Won	
London Film Critics' Circle	February 1, 2026	Breakthrough Performer of the Year	Chase Infiniti	Nominated	
London Film Critics' Circle	February 1, 2026	Technical Achievement Award	Editing (Andy Jurgensen)	Nominated	
Los Angeles Film Critics Association	December 7, 2025	Best Picture	One Battle After Another	Won	
Los Angeles Film Critics Association	December 7, 2025	Best Director	Paul Thomas Anderson	Won	
Los Angeles Film Critics Association	December 7, 2025	Best Supporting Performance	Teyana Taylor	Won (Note: Shared with Stellan Skarsgård for Sentimental Value.)	
Los Angeles Film Critics Association	December 7, 2025	Best Editing	Andy Jurgensen	Runner-up	
MacGuffin Awards	September 12, 2026	Contemporary Feature Film	Matthew Cavaliero and Robbie Duncan	Won	
Mainichi Film Awards	January 15, 2026	Best Foreign Film	One Battle After Another	Won	
Make-Up Artists & Hair Stylists Guild Awards	February 14, 2026	Best Contemporary Make-Up (Feature-Length Motion Picture)	Heba Thorisdottir and Mandy Artusato	Won	
Make-Up Artists & Hair Stylists Guild Awards	February 14, 2026	Best Special Make-Up Prosthetics (Feature-Length Motion Picture)	Arjen Tuiten and Jessica Nelson	Nominated	
Make-Up Artists & Hair Stylists Guild Awards	February 14, 2026	Best Contemporary Hair Styling (Feature-Length Motion Picture)	Ahou Mofid, Gina Marie DeAngelis, and Sacha Quarles	Won	
NAACP Image Awards	February 28, 2026	Outstanding Supporting Actress in a Motion Picture	Regina Hall	Nominated	
NAACP Image Awards	February 28, 2026	Outstanding Supporting Actress in a Motion Picture	Teyana Taylor	Nominated	
NAACP Image Awards	February 28, 2026	Outstanding Breakthrough Performance in a Motion Picture	Chase Infiniti	Nominated	
National Board of Review	December 3, 2025	Best Film	One Battle After Another	Won	
National Board of Review	December 3, 2025	Best Director	Paul Thomas Anderson	Won	
National Board of Review	December 3, 2025	Best Actor	Leonardo DiCaprio	Won	
National Board of Review	December 3, 2025	Best Supporting Actor	Benicio del Toro	Won	
National Board of Review	December 3, 2025	Breakthrough Performance	Chase Infiniti	Won	
National Society of Film Critics	January 3, 2026	Best Picture	One Battle After Another	Won	
National Society of Film Critics	January 3, 2026	Best Director	Paul Thomas Anderson	Won	
National Society of Film Critics	January 3, 2026	Best Supporting Actor	Benicio del Toro	Won	
National Society of Film Critics	January 3, 2026	Best Supporting Actress	Teyana Taylor	Won	
National Society of Film Critics	January 3, 2026	Best Cinematography	Michael Bauman	3rd place	
New York Film Critics Circle	December 2, 2025	Best Film	One Battle After Another	Won	
New York Film Critics Circle	December 2, 2025	Best Supporting Actor	Benicio del Toro	Won	
New York Film Critics Online	December 15, 2025	Best Picture	One Battle After Another	Won	
New York Film Critics Online	December 15, 2025	Best Director	Paul Thomas Anderson	Runner-up	
New York Film Critics Online	December 15, 2025	Best Actor	Leonardo DiCaprio	Nominated	
New York Film Critics Online	December 15, 2025	Best Supporting Actor	Benicio del Toro	Nominated	
New York Film Critics Online	December 15, 2025	Best Supporting Actor	Sean Penn	Nominated	
New York Film Critics Online	December 15, 2025	Best Supporting Actress	Regina Hall	Nominated	
New York Film Critics Online	December 15, 2025	Best Supporting Actress	Teyana Taylor	Nominated	
New York Film Critics Online	December 15, 2025	Best Screenplay	Paul Thomas Anderson	Nominated	
New York Film Critics Online	December 15, 2025	Best Ensemble Cast	One Battle After Another	Runner-up	
New York Film Critics Online	December 15, 2025	Best Cinematography	Michael Bauman	Nominated	
New York Film Critics Online	December 15, 2025	Best Use of Music	Jonny Greenwood	Nominated	
New York Film Critics Online	December 15, 2025	Best Breakthrough Performer	Chase Infiniti	Won	
Online Film Critics Society	January 26, 2026	Best Picture	One Battle After Another	Won	
Online Film Critics Society	January 26, 2026	Best Director	Paul Thomas Anderson	Won	
Online Film Critics Society	January 26, 2026	Best Actor	Leonardo DiCaprio	Nominated	
Online Film Critics Society	January 26, 2026	Best Supporting Actor	Benicio del Toro	Won	
Online Film Critics Society	January 26, 2026	Best Supporting Actor	Sean Penn	Nominated	
Online Film Critics Society	January 26, 2026	Best Supporting Actress	Teyana Taylor	Nominated	
Online Film Critics Society	January 26, 2026	Best Adapted Screenplay	Paul Thomas Anderson	Won	
Online Film Critics Society	January 26, 2026	Best Ensemble & Casting	One Battle After Another	Nominated	
Online Film Critics Society	January 26, 2026	Best Cinematography	Michael Bauman	Nominated	
Online Film Critics Society	January 26, 2026	Best Editing	Andy Jurgensen	Won	
Online Film Critics Society	January 26, 2026	Best Original Score	Jonny Greenwood	Nominated	
Online Film Critics Society	January 26, 2026	Best Sound Design	One Battle After Another	Nominated	
Online Film Critics Society	January 26, 2026	Best Choreography (Dance & Stunt)	One Battle After Another	Nominated	
Palm Springs International Film Festival	January 3, 2026	Desert Palm Achievement Award	Leonardo DiCaprio	Honored	
Phoenix Film Critics Society	December 15, 2025	Top 10 Films	One Battle After Another	Won	
Phoenix Film Critics Society	December 15, 2025	Best Picture	One Battle After Another	Won	
Phoenix Film Critics Society	December 15, 2025	Best Director	Paul Thomas Anderson	Won	
Phoenix Film Critics Society	December 15, 2025	Best Actor in a Leading Role	Leonardo DiCaprio	Won	
Phoenix Film Critics Society	December 15, 2025	Best Actor in a Supporting Role	Sean Penn	Won	
Phoenix Film Critics Society	December 15, 2025	Best Actress in a Supporting Role	Teyana Taylor	Won	
Phoenix Film Critics Society	December 15, 2025	Best Screenplay Adapted from Other Material	Paul Thomas Anderson	Won	
Phoenix Film Critics Society	December 15, 2025	Best Film Editing	Andy Jurgensen	Won	
Phoenix Film Critics Society	December 15, 2025	Breakthrough Performance	Chase Infiniti	Won	
Producers Guild of America Awards	February 28, 2026	Outstanding Producer of Theatrical Motion Pictures	Adam Somner, Sara Murphy, and Paul Thomas Anderson	Won	
Robert Awards	January 31, 2026	Best English Language Film	Paul Thomas Anderson	Won	
San Diego Film Critics Society	December 15, 2025	Best Picture	One Battle After Another	Runner-up	
San Diego Film Critics Society	December 15, 2025	Best Director	Paul Thomas Anderson	Nominated	
San Diego Film Critics Society	December 15, 2025	Best Actor	Leonardo DiCaprio	Nominated	
San Diego Film Critics Society	December 15, 2025	Best Supporting Actor	Benicio del Toro	Nominated	
San Diego Film Critics Society	December 15, 2025	Best Supporting Actor	Sean Penn	Runner-up	
San Diego Film Critics Society	December 15, 2025	Best Supporting Actress	Teyana Taylor	Nominated	
San Diego Film Critics Society	December 15, 2025	Best Adapted Screenplay	Paul Thomas Anderson	Runner-up	
San Diego Film Critics Society	December 15, 2025	Best Cinematography	Michael Bauman	Runner-up	
San Diego Film Critics Society	December 15, 2025	Best Editing	Andy Jurgensen	Runner-up	
San Diego Film Critics Society	December 15, 2025	Best Stunt Choreography	One Battle After Another	Nominated	
San Diego Film Critics Society	December 15, 2025	Breakthrough Performance	Chase Infiniti	Honored	
San Francisco Bay Area Film Critics Circle	December 14, 2025	Best Picture	One Battle After Another	Won	
San Francisco Bay Area Film Critics Circle	December 14, 2025	Best Director	Paul Thomas Anderson	Won	
San Francisco Bay Area Film Critics Circle	December 14, 2025	Best Actor	Leonardo DiCaprio	Runner-up	
San Francisco Bay Area Film Critics Circle	December 14, 2025	Best Supporting Actor	Benicio del Toro	Won	
San Francisco Bay Area Film Critics Circle	December 14, 2025	Best Supporting Actor	Sean Penn	Nominated	
San Francisco Bay Area Film Critics Circle	December 14, 2025	Best Supporting Actress	Teyana Taylor	Nominated	
San Francisco Bay Area Film Critics Circle	December 14, 2025	Best Adapted Screenplay	Paul Thomas Anderson	Won	
San Francisco Bay Area Film Critics Circle	December 14, 2025	Best Cinematography	Michael Bauman	Nominated	
San Francisco Bay Area Film Critics Circle	December 14, 2025	Best Film Editing	Andy Jurgensen	Won	
San Francisco Bay Area Film Critics Circle	December 14, 2025	Best Original Score	Jonny Greenwood	Runner-up	
San Francisco Bay Area Film Critics Circle	December 14, 2025	Best Production Design	Florencia Martin	Nominated	
Santa Barbara International Film Festival	February 7–9, 2026	Hammond Cinema Vanguard Award	Benicio del Toro	Honored	
Santa Barbara International Film Festival	February 7–9, 2026	Hammond Cinema Vanguard Award	Leonardo DiCaprio	Honored	
Santa Barbara International Film Festival	February 7–9, 2026	Hammond Cinema Vanguard Award	Sean Penn	Honored	
Santa Barbara International Film Festival	February 7–9, 2026	Variety Artisans Award	Editing (Andy Jurgensen)	Honored	
Santa Barbara International Film Festival	February 7–9, 2026	Virtuoso Award	Chase Infiniti	Honored	
Santa Barbara International Film Festival	February 7–9, 2026	Virtuoso Award	Teyana Taylor	Honored	
Satellite Awards	March 10, 2026	Best Motion Picture – Drama	One Battle After Another	Nominated	
Satellite Awards	March 10, 2026	Best Director	Paul Thomas Anderson	Nominated	
Satellite Awards	March 10, 2026	Best Actor in a Motion Picture – Drama	Leonardo DiCaprio	Nominated	
Satellite Awards	March 10, 2026	Best Actress in a Motion Picture – Drama	Chase Infiniti	Nominated	
Satellite Awards	March 10, 2026	Best Actor in a Supporting Role	Benicio del Toro	Nominated	
Satellite Awards	March 10, 2026	Best Actor in a Supporting Role	Sean Penn	Nominated	
Satellite Awards	March 10, 2026	Best Actress in a Supporting Role	Teyana Taylor	Won	
Satellite Awards	March 10, 2026	Best Adapted Screenplay	Paul Thomas Anderson	Won	
Satellite Awards	March 10, 2026	Best Cinematography	Michael Bauman	Nominated	
Satellite Awards	March 10, 2026	Best Film Editing	Andy Jurgensen	Won	
Satellite Awards	March 10, 2026	Best Original Score	Jonny Greenwood	Nominated	
Satellite Awards	March 10, 2026	Best Sound	José Antonio García, Christopher Scarabosio, and Tony Villaflor	Nominated	
Saturn Awards	March 8, 2026	Best Action / Adventure Film	One Battle After Another	Nominated	
SCAD Savannah Film Festival	October 26, 2025	Gold Derby Spotlight Award	Regina Hall	Honored	
SCAD Savannah Film Festival	October 26, 2025	Outstanding Achievement in Casting Award	Cassandra Kulukundis	Honored	
Screen Awards	December 24, 2025	Best Picture	One Battle After Another	Won	
Screen Awards	December 24, 2025	Best Director	Paul Thomas Anderson	Nominated	
Screen Awards	December 24, 2025	Best Lead Performance by an Actor – Film	Leonardo DiCaprio	Nominated	
Screen Awards	December 24, 2025	Best Lead Performance by an Actress – Film	Chase Infiniti	Nominated	
Screen Awards	December 24, 2025	Best Supporting Performance by an Actor – Film	Benicio del Toro	Nominated	
Screen Awards	December 24, 2025	Best Supporting Performance by an Actor – Film	Sean Penn	Won	
Screen Awards	December 24, 2025	Best Supporting Performance by an Actress – Film	Regina Hall	Nominated	
Screen Awards	December 24, 2025	Best Supporting Performance by an Actress – Film	Teyana Taylor	Won	
Seattle Film Critics Society	December 15, 2025	Best Picture	One Battle After Another	Won	
Seattle Film Critics Society	December 15, 2025	Best Director	Paul Thomas Anderson	Won	
Seattle Film Critics Society	December 15, 2025	Best Actor in a Leading Role	Leonardo DiCaprio	Won	
Seattle Film Critics Society	December 15, 2025	Best Actor in a Supporting Role	Benicio del Toro	Nominated	
Seattle Film Critics Society	December 15, 2025	Best Actor in a Supporting Role	Sean Penn	Won	
Seattle Film Critics Society	December 15, 2025	Best Actress in a Supporting Role	Teyana Taylor	Nominated	
Seattle Film Critics Society	December 15, 2025	Best Screenplay	Paul Thomas Anderson	Won	
Seattle Film Critics Society	December 15, 2025	Best Ensemble Cast	Cassandra Kulukundis	Won	
Seattle Film Critics Society	December 15, 2025	Best Cinematography	Michael Bauman	Nominated	
Seattle Film Critics Society	December 15, 2025	Best Film Editing	Andy Jurgensen	Won	
Seattle Film Critics Society	December 15, 2025	Best Original Score	Jonny Greenwood	Won	
Seattle Film Critics Society	December 15, 2025	Best Villain Performance	Col. Steven J. Lockjaw (Sean Penn)	Nominated	
Set Decorators Society of America Awards	February 21, 2026	Best Picture	Paul Thomas Anderson, Anthony Carlino, and Florencia Martin	Won	
Set Decorators Society of America Awards	February 21, 2026	Best Achievement in Décor/Design of a Contemporary Feature Film	Anthony Carlino and Florencia Martin	Won	
Society of Camera Operators	March 7, 2026	Camera Operator of the Year – Film	Colin Anderson	Won	
Society of Composers & Lyricists	February 6, 2026	Outstanding Original Score for a Studio Film	Jonny Greenwood	Nominated	
Southeastern Film Critics Association	December 15, 2025	Top 10 Films	One Battle After Another	1st place	
Southeastern Film Critics Association	December 15, 2025	Best Director	Paul Thomas Anderson	Runner-up	
Southeastern Film Critics Association	December 15, 2025	Best Supporting Actor	Benicio del Toro	Won	
Southeastern Film Critics Association	December 15, 2025	Best Supporting Actor	Sean Penn	Runner-up	
Southeastern Film Critics Association	December 15, 2025	Best Supporting Actress	Teyana Taylor	Runner-up	
Southeastern Film Critics Association	December 15, 2025	Best Adapted Screenplay	Paul Thomas Anderson	Won	
Southeastern Film Critics Association	December 15, 2025	Best Ensemble	One Battle After Another	Runner-up	
Southeastern Film Critics Association	December 15, 2025	Best Cinematography	Michael Bauman	Runner-up	
Southeastern Film Critics Association	December 15, 2025	Best Score	Jonny Greenwood	Runner-up	
St. Louis Film Critics Association	December 14, 2025	Best Picture	One Battle After Another	Won	
St. Louis Film Critics Association	December 14, 2025	Best Director	Paul Thomas Anderson	Won	
St. Louis Film Critics Association	December 14, 2025	Best Actor	Leonardo DiCaprio	Won	
St. Louis Film Critics Association	December 14, 2025	Best Actress	Chase Infiniti	Nominated	
St. Louis Film Critics Association	December 14, 2025	Best Supporting Actor	Bencio del Toro	Nominated	
St. Louis Film Critics Association	December 14, 2025	Best Supporting Actor	Sean Penn	Won	
St. Louis Film Critics Association	December 14, 2025	Best Supporting Actress	Teyana Taylor	Nominated	
St. Louis Film Critics Association	December 14, 2025	Best Adapted Screenplay	Paul Thomas Anderson	Won	
St. Louis Film Critics Association	December 14, 2025	Best Ensemble Cast	One Battle After Another	Won	
St. Louis Film Critics Association	December 14, 2025	Best Cinematography	Michael Bauman	Won	
St. Louis Film Critics Association	December 14, 2025	Best Editing	Andy Jurgensen	Won	
St. Louis Film Critics Association	December 14, 2025	Best Original Score	Jonny Greenwood	Won	
St. Louis Film Critics Association	December 14, 2025	Best Stunts	Brian Machleit	Nominated	
St. Louis Film Critics Association	December 14, 2025	Best Action Film	One Battle After Another	Nominated	
St. Louis Film Critics Association	December 14, 2025	Best Scene	Climactic rolling hills car chase scene	Nominated	
Toronto Film Critics Association	December 7, 2025	Best Picture	One Battle After Another	Won	
Toronto Film Critics Association	December 7, 2025	Best Director	Paul Thomas Anderson	Won	
Toronto Film Critics Association	December 7, 2025	Best Leading Performance	Leonardo DiCaprio	Runner-up	
Toronto Film Critics Association	December 7, 2025	Best Supporting Performance	Benicio del Toro	Won (Note: Shared with Nina Hoss for Hedda.)	
Toronto Film Critics Association	December 7, 2025	Best Supporting Performance	Sean Penn	Runner-up	
Toronto Film Critics Association	December 7, 2025	Best Breakthrough Performance	Chase Infiniti	Runner-up	
Toronto Film Critics Association	December 7, 2025	Best Adapted Screenplay	Paul Thomas Anderson	Won	
USC Scripter Awards	January 24, 2026	Film	One Battle After Another (Paul Thomas Anderson)	Won	
Vancouver Film Critics Circle	February 23, 2026	Best Film	One Battle After Another	Won	
Vancouver Film Critics Circle	February 23, 2026	Best Director	Paul Thomas Anderson	Nominated	
Vancouver Film Critics Circle	February 23, 2026	Best Male Actor	Leonardo DiCaprio	Nominated	
Vancouver Film Critics Circle	February 23, 2026	Best Supporting Male Actor	Benicio del Toro	Nominated	
Vancouver Film Critics Circle	February 23, 2026	Best Supporting Male Actor	Sean Penn	Won	
Vancouver Film Critics Circle	February 23, 2026	Best Supporting Female Actor	Teyana Taylor	Nominated	
Vancouver Film Critics Circle	February 23, 2026	Best Screenplay	Paul Thomas Anderson	Nominated	
Variety Creative Impact Awards	January 4, 2026	Creative Impact in Breakthrough Performance	Teyana Taylor	Honored	
Washington D.C. Area Film Critics Association	December 7, 2025	Best Picture	One Battle After Another	Nominated	
Washington D.C. Area Film Critics Association	December 7, 2025	Best Director	Paul Thomas Anderson	Nominated	
Washington D.C. Area Film Critics Association	December 7, 2025	Best Actor	Leonardo DiCaprio	Nominated	
Washington D.C. Area Film Critics Association	December 7, 2025	Best Actress	Chase Infiniti	Nominated	
Washington D.C. Area Film Critics Association	December 7, 2025	Best Supporting Actor	Benicio del Toro	Won	
Washington D.C. Area Film Critics Association	December 7, 2025	Best Supporting Actor	Sean Penn	Nominated	
Washington D.C. Area Film Critics Association	December 7, 2025	Best Supporting Actress	Teyana Taylor	Won	
Washington D.C. Area Film Critics Association	December 7, 2025	Best Adapted Screenplay	Paul Thomas Anderson	Won	
Washington D.C. Area Film Critics Association	December 7, 2025	Best Ensemble Cast	One Battle After Another	Nominated	
Washington D.C. Area Film Critics Association	December 7, 2025	Best Cinematography	Michael Bauman	Nominated	
Washington D.C. Area Film Critics Association	December 7, 2025	Best Editing	Andy Jurgensen	Nominated	
Washington D.C. Area Film Critics Association	December 7, 2025	Best Score	Jonny Greenwood	Nominated	
Washington D.C. Area Film Critics Association	December 7, 2025	Best Stunts	Brian Machleit	Nominated	
Webby Awards	April 21, 2026	Best Game or Application – Individual	One Battle After Another: The Revolution (Sawhorse Productions)	Nominated	
Women Film Critics Circle	December 18, 2025	Best Actor	Leonardo DiCaprio	Runner-up	
Women Film Critics Circle	December 18, 2025	Best Supporting Actress	Regina Hall	Won	
World Soundtrack Awards	October 10, 2026	Film Composer of the Year	Jonny Greenwood	Nominated	
Writers Guild of America Awards	March 8, 2026	Best Adapted Screenplay	Paul Thomas Anderson	Won	
