= Leeds Knights =

- City: Leeds, England
- League: NIHL
- Division: National League
- Founded: 2019
- Home arena: Planet Ice Leeds
- Colors: Blue, Yellow and White
- Head coach: Ryan Aldridge (England)
- Captain: Kieran Brown (England)
- Website: Leeds Knights

Franchise history
- 2019 - 2021: Leeds Chiefs
- 2021 - Present: Leeds Knights

Championships
- Regular season titles: 3 (2023, 2024, 2025)
- Challenge Cups: 1 (2025)
- Playoff championships: 2 (2023, 2026)

The Leeds Knights are a professional ice hockey team based in Leeds, West Yorkshire, England. The team is a member of the National League and plays at Planet Ice Leeds.

== History ==
The team was announced, along with the new National League, on 16 March 2019. However, rumours of a Leeds-based team playing out of the 1800 capacity Planet Ice Leeds arena were circulating months beforehand. In joining the league, they became the first ever hockey team to play out of the city.

The Chiefs name was selected by Planet Ice following the results of a fan poll. The 'Chiefs' moniker won the poll, results of which were announced on 16 May 2019, having beaten the alternatives; Cotton Kings and Mighty Mammoths.

Former Whitley Warriors Defenceman Sam Zajac was announced as Player-coach of the team on 10 May 2019. Zajac's first signing for the Chiefs was former Manchester Phoenix captain, Defenceman Luke Boothroyd.

In November 2019, head coach Sam Zajac launched an urgent appeal after a large amount of the team's equipment was stolen from an apartment block in Batley. This included new helmets that hadn't even been worn yet, along with sticks and gloves used by the players all season. Despite this, the Chiefs confirmed their weekend games would go ahead as planned via a statement on Twitter.

In their first National League season, the Chiefs finished 10th. They won 13 games, losing 36, achieving 28 points overall. The season was curtailed in March 2020, due to the COVID-19 pandemic. For the first five months of the season, the Chiefs were required to play home games elsewhere, due to a delay in the opening of their rink. The first game at their Elland Road arena was against Sheffield Steeldogs on 31 January 2020.

In 2021, the club rebranded and changed their name from Leeds Chiefs to Leeds Knights due to a change in ownership. The team is now owned by Stephen Nell who was an also owner of Swindon Wildcats. The new name has ties to the Royal Armouries in Leeds. David Whistle arrived as Head Coach and General Manager, but departed in January 2022. Former Swindon Wildcats coach Ryan Aldridge was then appointed as interim coach until the end of the 2021/22 season.

Aldridge was named as permanent Head Coach ready for the 2022-2023 season, a season in which the Knights won both the league and the playoffs. In the 2023-2024 season, the Knights successfully defended their league title, but lost in the playoff final to Peterborough Phantoms in a shootout defeat. The following off-season, England Ice Hockey accepted a request to submit Leeds Knights 2, a new team, into the NIHL 1 North league. Upon creation, Davey Lawrence, the Leeds' National League team's assistant head coach, became the Head Coach of Knights 2.

== Roster ==
Correct as of 9 October 2026

(*) Denotes a Non-British Trained player (Import)

Netminders
No.	Nat.	Player	Catches	Date of birth	Place of birth	Acquired	Contract
31	(England)	Sam Gospel	L	27 March 1994 (age 32)	Nottingham	2021 from Manchester Storm	26/27
32	(England)	Harrison Walker	L	25 June 2002 (age 24)	Bradford	2026 from Blackburn Hawks	26/27

Defencemen
No.	Nat.	Player	Shoots	Date of birth	Place of birth	Acquired	Contract
3	(England)	Bailey Perre	R	10 May 2004 (age 22)	Swindon	2022 from Swindon Wildcats	26/27
8	(Canada)	Bowdyn Neely	R	15 October 2003 (age 22)	Calgary, Canada	2023 from South Shore Kings	26/27
11	(Canada)	Sam Dunn*	R	11 March 1998 (age 28)	Bewdley, Canada	2025 from Anglet	26/27
13	(England)	Jonas Bennett	L	29 April 2009 (age 17)	Sheffield	2025 from Leeds Junior Knights	26/27 (2-way)
18	(England)	Liam Hine	L	18 July 2008 (age 18)	Blackburn	2025 from Blackburn Hawks	26/27 (2-way)
21	(England)	Zach Sullivan	R	14 July 1994 (age 32)	Redhill	2026 from Manchester Storm	26/27
43	(England)	Sam Cooper	R	12 September 2004 (age 22)	Portsmouth	2025 from Sheffield Steeldogs	26/27
44	(England)	Jordan Griffin	R	29 January 2002 (age 24)	Crewe	2020 from Sheffield Steelers	26/27

Forwards
No.	Nat.	Player	Shoots	Date of birth	Place of birth	Acquired	Contract
12	(England)	Kieran Brown 'C'	L	27 February 2001 (age 25)	Bradford	2021 from Widnes Wild	28/29
16	(Latvia)	Edgars Vengis	L	18 September 2008 (age 18)	Ogre, Latvia	2024 from Leeds Junior Knights	28/29 (2-way)
19	(Scotland)	Innes Gallacher	R	5 October 2004 (age 22)	Kilmarnock	2023 from Kilmarnock Thunder	26/27
24	(Canada)	Cullen McLean*	L	10 February 2001 (age 25)	Brooklin, Canada	2026 from Bisons de Neuilly-sur-Marne	26/27
33	(England)	Finley Bradon	R	24 November 2005 (age 20)	Darlington	2022 from Billingham Stars	26/27
36	(England)	Danny Harrison	R	2 February 2009 (age 17)	Bradford	2025 from Bradford Bulldogs	26/27 (2-way)
41	(England)	Oliver Endicott	L	10 June 2004 (age 22)	Swindon	2022 from IPK U20	26/27
72	(England)	Daragh Spawforth	R	21 August 2008 (age 18)	Bradford	2025 from Blackburn Hawks	26/27 (2-way)
73	(Canada)	Matt Bissonnette*	L	16 January 1992 (age 34)	Beaconsfield, Canada	2024 from Sheffield Steeldogs	26/27
78	(Canada)	Liam Peyton*	L	30 March 2000 (age 26)	Orleans, Canada	2025 from Trois-Rivières Lions	26/27
93	(Hungary)	Balint Pakozdi	L	3 May 1999 (age 27)	Budapest, Hungary	2025 from Swindon Wildcats	26/27
96	(Canada)	Owen Sobchak*	L	8 May 1993 (age 33)	Niagara Falls, Canada	2026 from Hull Seahawks	26/27

Team Staff
Nat.	Name	Position	Acquired	Place of birth	Joined from
(England)	Ryan Aldridge	Head coach	2022	Swindon, England	Okanagan Hockey Academy U18, England U18
(England)	Stephen Nell	General manager/Owner	2021	England	Swindon Wildcats, NIHL
(England)	Jason Thomas	Equipment/Team Manager	2019	Swindon, England
(England)	Verity Thomas	Partnership Manager	2024	England

== Season-by-season record ==
As of 19 April 2026

As Leeds Chiefs:
Season	League	GP	W	L	OTL	PTS	GF	GA	League Position	Cup	Playoffs
2019-20	National Ice Hockey League	49	13	34	2	28	145	229	10th of 10	N/A	N/A
2021-22	National Ice Hockey League	48	27	19	2	56	186	172	4th of 9	DNQ	QF
As Leeds Knights:
Season	League	GP	W	L	OTL	PTS	GF	GA	League Position	Cup	Playoffs
2022-23	National Ice Hockey League	56	46	5	5	97	310	144	1st of 11 (C)	F	Champions
2023-24	National Ice Hockey League	54	46	7	1	93	266	132	1st of 11 (C)	SF	F
2024-25	National Ice Hockey League	54	41	11	2	84	253	135	1st of 11 (C)	Champions	SF
2025-26	National Ice Hockey League	54	33	18	3	69	210	166	3rd of 11	F	Champions

Note: GP = Games played; W = Wins; L = Losses; T = Ties; OTL = Overtime Losses; PTS = Points; GF = Goals For; GA = Goals Against
