= Ryan Watt =

Scottish ice hockey player

- Born: 8 December 1989 (age 35); Irvine, Scotland
- Height: 5 ft 11 in (180 cm)
- Weight: 176 lb (80 kg; 12 st 8 lb)
- Position: Forward
- Shoots: Right
- NIHL team Former teams: Bracknell Bees; Basingstoke Bison; Bracknell Bees; Swindon Wildcats; Slough Jets; Braehead Clan; Hull Pirates; Streatham RedHawks
- Playing career: 2004–present

Ryan Watt (born 8 December 1989) is a Scottish professional ice hockey forward currently playing for the Bracknell Bees of the National Ice Hockey League.

Watt began his career with the Basingstoke Bison, joining their under-16 team in 2000 and making his Elite League debut for the team during the 2004–05 EIHL season. He continued to make sporadic appearances for the Bison between 2006 and 2009, while he mainly played in the second-tier English Premier Ice Hockey League for development, playing for the Bracknell Bees and the Swindon Wildcats. From 2009 to 2012, Walker played solely in the EPIHL, playing for the Bees, the Wildcats and the Slough Jets.

In 2012, Watt returned to the Elite League for the first time since 2009, signing for the Braehead Clan, based in Glasgow in his native Scotland. He played a total of 35 games for the Clan, scoring 4 goals. Afterwards, Watt returned to the EIPHL once more and was once again suiting up for Slough, Swindon and Bracknell and also made a return for the Basingstoke Bison in January 2015, for the first time since 2009.

In 2016, Watt signed for the Hull Pirates of the EPIHL and in 2017, he signed for the Streatham RedHawks and was now playing in the National Ice Hockey League, which became the UK's second-tier league in 2017 after the disbanding of the EPIHL. On 6 June 2018, Watt returned to the Bracknell Bees once more.
