= Joshua Lipsey =

- Born: June 11, 1983 (age 42); Toronto, Ontario
- Education: Certified in Applied Functional Science
- Alma mater: Sheridan College
- Occupation: Fitness Expert
- Employer: CORE
- Known for: Creating Core Concepts Inc.
- Website: bewithcore.com

Joshua Lipsey is a Canadian fitness expert, consultant and entrepreneur, best known for being the founder of Core Concepts. Precor named him as one of the four personal trainers to follow on Twitter in 2010. He was featured on CNN in 2014 for helping one of his clients lose 110 lbs in seven months. Lipsey also created the popular on-demand workout website Core-Fix in 2020 during the start of the pandemic.

== Background ==
Lipsey was born on June 11, 1983 in Toronto, Ontario, Canada. He attended Sheridan College (Wyoming) and the Canadian Natural School of Nutrition. The former professional basketball player suffered a slipped disc in between seasons in Europe and recovered by working out while focusing on the core of the body.

He has been featured on programs such as Extra, Access Hollywood, and Entertainment Tonight Canada, along with being the first male trainer featured in Self magazine with Cat Deeley. Some of his other notable clients: Kelly Mi Li, Danielle Ruhl, Corinne Olympios, Patrick Patterson, Zach Edey, and Xavier Rathan-Mayes.

Lipsey is a member of amfAR, along with being a Toronto International Film Festival Apprentice and donor. In 2010, He was a notable guest at Kim Kardashian’s 30th birthday party.

== Basketball career ==
Lipsey started his playing career at Sheridan College in Wyoming before transferring to Morris College in New Jersey. There he received a medical redshirt and was recovering from injuries sustained in a car accident. After his recovery, he decided to become a professional player instead of returning to the college game.

He played guard for BK Sadska in the Czech Republic, BK Puertollano in Spain, and the Leicester Riders in the United Kingdom (2007-2008).

== Core Concepts ==
Joshua Lipsey is the founder and director of Core Concepts Inc. At Core Concepts, Lipsey promotes a brand and athletic training method focusing on the core of the body.In 2015, He developed a new boutique class workout called Core Tone which uses slat technology to enhance functional movements. He has deemed this process as a 'transcoremation' through functional, dynamic, and holds that engage the abdominal muscles including the glutes, back and obliques, to ensure that every muscle is working toward establishing a strong and balanced core.
