= Martha Stephens =

American film writer and director (born 1984)

- Born: March 12, 1984 (age 42); Huntington, West Virginia, U.S.
- Occupations: Writer, director, filmmaker
- Years active: 2009–present

Martha Stephens (born March 12, 1984) is an American film writer and director.

Stephens was born in West Virginia and raised in eastern Kentucky. She graduated from the University of North Carolina School of the Arts, School of Filmmaking, where she concentrated in directing.

Stephens' first two feature films, Passenger Pigeons (2010) and Pilgrim Song (2012), premiered at the South by Southwest festival and received several awards. Her third film, Land Ho! (2014), which she co-directed with Aaron Katz, premiered at the Sundance Film Festival and was purchased for worldwide distribution by Sony Pictures Classics. At the 30th Independent Spirit Awards, Land Ho! was given the John Cassavetes Award for best feature film with a budget under $500,000. Her fourth feature film To the Stars, with Kara Hayward, Liana Liberato, Malin Åkerman, and Tony Hale starring, premiered at the 2019 Sundance Film Festival in the U.S. Dramatic Competition. It was released on April 24, 2020, by Samuel Goldwyn Films.
