= Daryl Lipsey =

Canadian ice hockey player and coach

- Born: 26 June 1963 (age 63) North Battleford, Saskatchewan, Canada
- Height: 5 ft 7 in (170 cm)
- Weight: 154 lb (70 kg; 11 st 0 lb)
- Position: Centre
- Shot: Left
- Played for: Battleford Barons (1982-1983); North Battleford North Stars (1983-1984); Bournemouth Stags (1984-1986); Swindon Wildcats (1986-1995); Manchester Storm (1995-1997)
- Coached for: Swindon Wildcats 1986-1995 (P/C); Manchester Storm 1995-1996 (Player/Asst. Coach); Manchester Storm 1996-2001 (Asst. Coach); Manchester Storm 2001-2003 (Head Coach); Swindon Wildcats 2004-2005 (Head Coach); Swindon Wildcats 2005-2006 (Team Consultant)
- Playing career: 1982–1997
- Coaching career: 1986–2006

Daryl Lipsey (born 26 June 1963) is a Canadian professional player and coach of ice hockey. Apart from two professional seasons in Canada he has played the majority of his career in the United Kingdom (from 1984 to 1997). Although he retired as a player in 1997, he continued to coach until 2005. He is also known under the nickname "Mr. Swindon Hockey" after being the Swindon ice hockey team's player-coach for 9 seasons and their head coach for one season.

== Biography ==
Lipsey began his career playing with the Battleford Barons of the Saskatchewan Junior Hockey League in 1982–83. He then played just one more season in Canada with the North Battleford North Stars before leaving Canada to join Bournemouth Stags of the British Hockey League in England. He spent two seasons with the Stags before joining the Swindon Wildcats for the 1986–1987 season. He played and coached the Wildcats for nine seasons. In 1995–96, he joined the Manchester Storm in the position of player and assistant coach.

He ended his playing career during the 1996-1997 Ice Hockey Superleague season, but continued on the team staff for Manchester Storm for six seasons, and the Swindon Wildcats' team staff for two years. His coaching career finished at Swindon in the 2004-2005 EPIHL season, then Lipsey became Swindon's "team consultant" for one more season before retiring completely from the sport.

== Statistics ==
For meanings of abbreviations, see ice hockey statistics.

Season	Team	League	PJ	B	A	PTS	PUN
1982-83	Battleford Barons	LHJS
1983-84	North Battlefords North Stars	LHJS	59	26	59	85	0
1984-85	Bournemouth Stags	BHL Div.1	20	57	24	81	71
1985-86	Bournemouth Stags	BHL Div.1	19	59	60	119	73
1986-87	Swindon Wildcats	BHL Div.1	29	79	66	145	99
1987-88	Medway Bears	BHL Div.1
1987-88	Swindon Wildcats	BHL Div.1	28	81	62	143	52
1988-89	Swindon Wildcats	BHL Div.1	24	53	46	99	52
1989-90	Swindon Wildcats	BHL Div.1	9	13	13	26	10
1990-91	Swindon Wildcats	BHL Div.1	8	19	12	31	20
1991-92	Swindon Wildcats	BHL Div.1	36	65	39	104	58
1992-93	Swindon Wildcats	BHL Div.1	31	21	22	43	46
1993-94	Swindon Wildcats	BNL	50	63	65	128	74
1994-95	Swindon Wildcats	BNL	44	83	81	164	53
1995-96	Manchester Storm	BNL	48	44	46	90	72
1996–97	Manchester Storm	LEH	2	0	0	0	0
1996-97	Manchester Storm	Cup B & H	7	0	1	1	4
1996–97	Manchester Storm	ISL	2	1	0	1	12
Totals			416	664	596	1,260	696
