= Swindon Wildcats =

Ice hockey team in Wiltshire, England

- City: Swindon, Wiltshire
- League: NIHL
- Division: National League
- Founded: 1986
- Home arena: Link Centre (capacity: 1000+)
- Colors: Red, White & Black
- Owner: Steve Nell (England)
- General manager: Aaron Nell (England)
- Head coach: Aaron Nell (England)
- Captain: Tyler Plews (Scotland)
- Media: Cats TV
- Affiliates: Swindon Wildcats 2, NIHL 2 Swindon TopCats, WNIHL 1

Franchise history
- 1986–1996: Swindon Wildcats
- 1996–1997: Swindon Ice Lords
- 1997–2000: Swindon Chill
- 2000–2001: Swindon Phoenix
- 2001–2004: Swindon Lynx
- 2004 – present: Swindon Wildcats

Championships
- Regular season titles: 4 (1996/97), (2000/01), (2018/19), (2025/26)
- Autumn Cups: 3 (1991), (2017), (2021)
- Premier Cups: 1 (2017/18)

The Swindon Wildcats are a professional ice hockey team based in Swindon, Wiltshire, England. They play in the National Ice Hockey League (NIHL). Since their inception, the Wildcats have played their home games at the 1000+ capacity Link Centre in West Swindon. The club was founded in 1986 as the Swindon Wildcats, shortly after the opening of the Link Centre in 1985.

The Wildcats were members of the English Premier Ice Hockey League (EPIHL) from 1997 to 2017. Due to the instability of the EPIHL following the culmination of the 2016–17 season, the Swindon Wildcats announced their intention to join the National League.

In their first season competing in the National League, the Wildcats won both the Autumn Cup and National Cup competitions, securing the club's first silverware since the 2000–01 season. The following year the Wildcats won the regular season, becoming the 2018/2019 champions. The Wildcats are the reigning NIHL National Champions having won the title on 28 February 2026 against the Sheffield Steeldogs, winning 3:2 away in Sheffield.

== Logos and uniforms ==
=== Logo ===
The Wildcats' logo is an animated wildcat in the team colours of red and white.

=== Jerseys ===
The jerseys currently worn by the Swindon Wildcats are in red and white, the colours sported by the team since the 2008–2009 relaunch. They have worn the same jerseys (with a few small variations) since the 2008–2009 season. For the 2019/20 campaign, the Wildcats will have an alternate jersey that is predominantly black with red motifs.

The first Wildcats colours were black, yellow, orange and white. Blue and white were worn in 2006 and 2007.

=== Mascot ===
The official mascot for the Swindon Wildcats is an anthropomorphized wildcat by the name of Scratch. Scratch took over from his cousin Willie Wildcats during the 2021/22 Season. Willie Wildcat had been the mascot for the 'Cats since their return to the Wildcats name in 2004, after three seasons as the Lynx. However, he retired after a successful career at the Better Link Centre.

== Season-by-season record ==
Season	League	GP	W	L	OTW	OTL	Pts.	Rank	Postseason
2007–2008	EPIHL	40	16	20	1	3	37	7th	Qualification
2008–2009	EPIHL	54	21	29	2	2	48	8th	Quarter-Final Loss
2009–2010	EPIHL	54	12	31	4	7	39	8th	Semi-Final Loss
2010–2011	EPIHL	54	16	31	3	4	42	7th	Quarter-Final Loss
2011–2012	EPIHL	54	25	23	0	6	56	7th	Quarter-Final Loss
2012–2013	EPIHL	54	20	22	1	11	53	7th	Quarter-Final Loss
2013–2014	EPIHL	54	23	23	6	2	60	5th	Semi-Final Loss
2014–2015	EPIHL	48	24	20	4	0	56	5th	Quarter-Final Loss
2015–2016	EPIHL	54	30	19	–	5	65	6th	Quarter-Final Loss
2016–2017	EPIHL	48	22	22	–	4	48	6th	Qualification
2017–2018	NIHL S1	32	18	6	4	4	48	3rd	Conf QF Loss
2018–2019	NIHL S1	42	31	7	1	3	67	Champions	Conf SF Loss
2024–2025	NIHL NAT	54	32	12	3	7	77	3rd	Semi-Final Loss
2025–2026									

== Club roster 2022–23 ==
(*) Denotes a Non-British Trained player (Import)

Netminders
No.	Nat.	Player	Catches	Date of birth	Place of birth	Acquired	Contract
30	(Scotland)	Renny Marr	L	8 October 1997 (age 28)	Lochgelly, Scotland	2017 from Coventry Blaze	26/27
45	(England)	Dean Skinns	L	3 October 1984 (age 42)	Basingstoke, England	2026 from Basingstoke Bison	26/27
34	(Wales)	Harry Thomas	L	28 July 2008 (age 18)	Cardiff, England	2026 from Bristol Pitbulls	26/27

Defencemen
No.	Nat.	Player	Shoots	Date of birth	Place of birth	Acquired	Contract
73	(England)	Edward Bradley	R	7 March 2001 (age 25)	Wokingham, England	2024 from Berkshire Bees	26/27
24	(Scotland)	Tyler Plews 'A'	R	13 September 1997 (age 29)	Kirkcaldy, Scotland	2018 from Edinburgh Capitals	26/27
4	(England)	Jacob Minter	L	24 April 2004 (age 22)	Nottingham, England	2026 from Slough Jets	26/27
46	(England)	Ben O'Connor	L	21 December 1988 (age 37)	Durham, England	2025 from Dundee Stars	26/27
78	(England)	Jamie Smith	R	10 January 2006 (age 20)	Swindon, England	2023 from Swindon Wildcats Academy	26/27
12	(Canada)	Ryan Wells	L	18 August 1999 (age 27)	Mississauga, Canada	2024 from Toronto Metro University	26/27

Forwards
No.	Nat.	Player	Shoots	Date of birth	Place of birth	Acquired	Contract
3	(Hungary) (United Kingdom)	Bálint Pákozdi	L	3 May 1999 (age 27)	Budapest, Hungary	2021 from New Hampshire Junior Monarchs	22/23
11	(Wales)	Chris Jones 'A'	R	4 January 1991 (age 35)	Cardiff, Wales	2017 from Cardiff Devils	22/23
12	(England)	Floyd Taylor	L	28 March 1995 (age 31)	Swindon, England	2011 from Swindon Leopards	22/23
13	(England)	Sam Bullas 'C'	R	20 September 1990 (age 36)	Nottingham, England	2010 from Nottingham Panthers	22/23
16	(England)	Reed Sayers	R	9 May 2001 (age 25)	Swindon, England	2018 from Cardiff Fire	22/23
18	(England)	Loris Taylor	L	1 August 1993 (age 33)	Swindon, England	2022 from Bristol Pitbulls	22/23
19	(England)	Aaron Nell	L	22 October 1989 (age 36)	Swindon, England	2013 from Sheffield Steelers	22/23
37	(England)	Jack Goodchild	R	14 October 2002 (age 23)	Winchester, England	2021 from Okanagan Hockey Academy UK	22/23
71	(Latvia)	Edgars Bebris	L	7 August 1991 (age 35)	Aizkraukle, Latvia	2021 from MK Lightning	22/23
89	(Poland)	Tomasz Malasinski*	L	23 August 1986 (age 40)	Nowy Targ, Poland	2019 from KH GKS Katowice	23/24
91	(Canada)	Colby Tower*	R	12 February 1997 (age 29)	Troy, NS, Canada	2022 from Nipissing University	22/23
	(England)	Russell Cowley	L	12 August 1983 (age 43)	Edmonton, Alberta, Canada	2022 from MK Lightning	22/23

Team Staff
No.	Nat.	Name	Acquired	Position	Place of birth	Joined From
19	(England)	Aaron Nell	2015	General Manager & Player-Coach	Swindon, England	Okanagan Hockey Academy U18
N/A	(England)	Lee Richardson	2019	Assistant coach	Swindon, England	Oxford City Stars, NIHL 2
N/A	(England)	Pete Bradford	2010	Equipment Manager	England
N/A	(England)	Steve Bradford	2014	Equipment Manager	England
N/A	(England)	Mark Thorne	2014	Assistant Equipment Manager	England

== 2022/23 Outgoing ==
Outgoing
No.	Nat.	Player	Shoots	Date of birth	Place of birth	Leaving For
27	(England)	Joshua Shaw	R	21 October 2005 (age 20)	Frimley, England	Bristol Pitbulls
38	(Czech Republic)	Emil Svec	L	12 July 1994 (age 32)	Milevsko, Czechia	Hull Seahawks
41	(England)	Oliver Endicott	L	10 June 2004 (age 22)	Swindon, England	Iisalmen Peli-Karhut U20
44	(England)	Neil Liddiard	R	7 May 1978 (age 48)	Swindon, England	Chelmsford Chieftains
73	(Wales)	Sam Smith	R	2 September 2001 (age 25)	Cardiff, Wales	Bristol Pitbulls
94	(England)	Declan Balmer	L	9 June 1995 (age 31)	Hull, England	Hull Seahawks

== Retired numbers ==
6 (England) Lee Brathwaite, D, 1992–1997, 1998–2009

7 (Canada) Bryan Larkin, D, 1991–2001

9 (Canada) Gary Dickie, F, 1993–1997

10 (England) Steve Nell, F, 1986–1988, 1990–1996, 1997–1998, General Manager 2004–2021 (Now Managing Director)

14 (Canada) Daryl Lipsey, F, 1986–1995

15 (Canada) Scott Koberinski, F, 1989–1993

17 (England) Ian Richards, F, 1987–1999

== See also ==
- Swindon Wildcats NIHL – amateur affiliated team playing in National Ice Hockey League South Division 2
