= 1970–71 British Ice Hockey season =

- Sport: ice hockey

Seasons
- ← 1969–70 1971–72 →

The 1970–71 British Ice Hockey season featured the Northern League for teams from Scotland and the north of England and the newly formed Southern League for teams from the rest of England.

Murrayfield Racers won the Northern League and Sussex Senators won the Southern League. Murrayfield Racers won the Icy Smith Cup.

== Northern League ==
=== Regular season ===
	Club	GP	W	T	L	GF–GA	Pts
1.	Murrayfield Racers	10	8	0	2	78:41	16
2.	Glasgow Dynamos	10	7	1	2	72:44	15
3.	Whitley Warriors	10	6	0	4	66:78	12
4.	Fife Flyers	10	4	1	5	58:67	9
5.	Ayr Bruins	10	3	0	7	69:95	6
6.	Durham Wasps	10	1	0	9	58:76	2

== Southern League ==
=== Regular season ===
	Club	GP	W	T	L	GF–GA	Pts
1.	Sussex Senators	6	4	0	2	17:16	8
2.	Altrincham Aces	6	2	3	1	34:22	7
3.	Wembley Vets	6	3	1	2	21:17	7
4.	Blackpool Seagulls	6	1	2	3	25:37	4
5.	Solihull Vikings	6	1	2	3	17:28	4

== Spring Cup ==
=== Final ===
Murrayfield Racers defeated the Ayr Bruins

== Icy Smith Cup ==
=== Final ===
Murrayfield Racers defeated Durham Wasps 21-8

== Autumn Cup ==
	Club	GP	W	L	T	GF	GA	Pts
1.	Murrayfield Racers	12	9	2	1	81	42	19
2.	Glasgow Dynamos	12	7	4	1	65	57	15
3.	Dundee Rockets	12	7	5	0	59	57	14
4.	Ayr Bruins	12	7	5	0	64	73	14
5.	Whitley Bay Warriors	12	6	6	0	91	86	12
6.	Fife Flyers	12	2	9	1	58	69	5
7.	Durham Wasps	12	2	9	1	59	93	5
