= 1973–74 British Ice Hockey season =

- Sport: ice hockey

Seasons
- ← 1972–73 1974–75 →

The 1973–74 British Ice Hockey season featured the Northern League for teams from Scotland and the north of England and the Southern League for teams from the rest of England.

Whitley Warriors won the Northern League and Streatham Redskins won the Southern League. Whitley Warriors won the Icy Smith Cup.

== Northern League ==
=== Regular season ===
	Club	GP	W	T	L	GF–GA	Pts
1.	Whitley Warriors	12	11	0	1	84:47	22
2.	Dundee Rockets	12	8	0	4	59:59	16
3.	Fife Flyers	12	7	1	4	91:64	15
4.	Murrayfield Racers	12	7	1	4	69:49	15
5.	Durham Wasps	12	4	2	6	68:78	10
6.	Glasgow Dynamos	12	2	2	8	26:54	6
7.	Paisley Mohawks	12	0	0	12	12:58	0

== Southern League ==
=== Regular season ===
	Club	GP	W	T	L	GF–GA	Pts
1.	Streatham Redskins	12	11	0	1	105:27	22
2.	Altrincham Aces	12	11	0	1	127:48	22
3.	Bristol Redwings	12	7	0	5	77:42	14
4.	Solihull Barons	12	7	0	5	66:48	14
5.	Blackpool Seagulls	12	2	1	9	42:97	5
6.	Liverpool Leopards	12	2	0	10	28:106	4
7.	Solihull Vikings	12	1	1	10	20:97	3

== Spring Cup ==
=== Final ===
Dundee Rockets defeated the Fife Flyers

== Icy Smith Cup ==
=== Final ===
Whitley Warriors defeated Streatham Redskins 18-5
