= 1977–78 British Ice Hockey season =

- Sport: ice hockey

Seasons
- ← 1976–77 1978–79 →

The 1977–78 British Ice Hockey season featured the Northern League for teams from Scotland and the north of England and the Southern League for teams from the rest of England.

Fife Flyers won the Northern League and Solihull Barons won the Southern League. Fife Flyers won the Icy Smith Cup.

== Northern League ==
=== Regular season ===
	Club	GP	W	T	L	GF–GA	Pts
1.	Fife Flyers	12	10	1	1	113:49	21
2.	Whitley Warriors	12	9	1	2	103:59	19
3.	Murrayfield Racers	12	8	1	3	91:58	17
4.	Billingham Bombers	12	6	0	6	83:81	12
5.	Durham Wasps	12	5	0	7	81:88	10
6.	Glasgow Dynamos	12	2	0	10	67:111	4
7.	Ayr Bruins	12	0	1	11	40:132	1

== Southern League ==
=== Midland Section ===
	Club	GP	W	T	L	GF–GA	Pts
1.	Blackpool Seagulls	10	9	0	1	74:24	18
2.	Deeside Dragons	10	7	0	3	53:41	14
3.	Grimsby Buffaloes	10	6	0	4	60:47	12
4.	Sheffield Lancers	10	6	0	4	42:33	12
5.	Liverpool Leopards	10	1	0	9	31:68	2
6.	London Sobell All-Stars*	10	1	0	9	22:69	2

(*Played all games away for four points per match.)

=== Southern Section ===
	Club	GP	W	T	L	GF–GA	Pts
1.	Solihull Barons	16	13	1	2	104:50	27
2.	Southampton Vikings	16	11	4	1	126:50	26
3.	Streatham Redskins	16	12	0	4	66:23	24
4.	Altrincham Aces	16	10	1	5	52:52	21
5.	Oxford University	16	8	0	8	46:32	16
6.	Avon Arrows	16	6	1	9	60:59	13
7.	Streatham Hawks	16	6	1	9	38:89	13
8.	London Phoenix Flyers	16	2	0	14	28:97	4
9.	Cambridge University*	16	0	0	16	7:75	0

(*Played all games away for four points per match.)

=== Final ===
Solihull Barons defeated Blackpool Seagulls 11:4 on aggregate (6:4, 5:0)

== Spring Cup ==
=== Final ===
Won by the Murrayfield Racers

== Icy Smith Cup ==
=== Final ===
Fife Flyers defeated Southampton Vikings 13-0 & 10-5

== Autumn Cup ==
	Club	GP	W	L	T	GF	GA	Pts
1.	Murrayfield Racers	12	11	1	0	116	43	22
2.	Fife Flyers	12	10	2	0	120	57	20
3.	Whitley Warriors	12	9	3	0	126	54	18
4.	Durham Wasps	12	5	7	0	73	84	10
5.	Glasgow Dynamos	12	4	8	0	77	101	8
6.	Ayr Bruins	12	2	10	0	47	127	4
7.	Billingham Bombers	12	1	11	0	60	153	2
