= 1974–75 British Ice Hockey season =

- Sport: ice hockey

Seasons
- ← 1973–74 1975–76 →

The 1974–75 British Ice Hockey season featured the Northern League for teams from Scotland and the north of England and the Southern League for teams from the rest of England.

Whitley Warriors won the Northern League and Streatham Redskins won the Southern League. Murrayfield Racers won the Icy Smith Cup.

== Northern League ==
=== Regular season ===
	Club	GP	W	T	L	GF–GA	Pts
1.	Whitley Warriors	14	13	0	1	126:48	26
2.	Murrayfield Racers	14	10	2	2	108:54	22
3.	Fife Flyers	14	10	1	3	84:65	21
4.	Dundee Rockets	14	6	4	4	67:68	16
5.	Ayr Bruins	14	4	2	8	37:48	10
6.	Durham Wasps	14	4	0	10	69:96	8
7.	Glasgow Dynamos	14	3	0	11	60:107	6
8.	Paisley Mohawks	14	1	1	12	47:112	3

== Southern League ==
=== Regular season ===
	Club	GP	W	T	L	GF–GA	Pts
1.	Streatham Redskins	10	10	0	0	122:14	20
2.	Solihull Barons	10	6	2	2	33:29	14
3.	Bristol Redwings	10	6	0	4	62:33	12
4.	Blackpool Seagulls	10	3	1	6	43:92	7
5.	Altrincham Aces	10	1	3	6	32:61	5
6.	Liverpool Leopards	10	1	0	9	13:76	2

== Spring Cup ==
=== Final ===
Fife Flyers' defeated the Murrayfield Racers

== Icy Smith Cup ==
=== Final ===
Murrayfield Racers defeated Streatham Redskins 12-9

== Autumn Cup ==
=== Game results ===
Glasgow Dynamos 6 - Dundee Rockets 8 All other results unknown

=== Top of table ===
	Club
1.	Murrayfield Racers
2.	Whitley Warriors
3.	Fife Flyers

Statistics and full list of teams unavailable. Other known teams, with unknown placements: Glasgow, Dundee.
