= 1975–76 British Ice Hockey season =

- Sport: ice hockey

Seasons
- ← 1974–75 1976–77 →

The 1975–76 British Ice Hockey season featured the Northern League for teams from Scotland and the north of England and the Southern League for teams from the rest of England.

Murrayfield Racers won the Northern League and Streatham Redskins won the Southern League. Ayr Bruins won the Icy Smith Cup.

== Northern League ==
=== Regular season ===
	Club	GP	W	T	L	GF–GA	Pts
1.	Murrayfield Racers	14	11	0	3	89:54	22
2.	Fife Flyers	14	10	1	3	118:57	21
3.	Whitley Warriors	14	10	1	3	111:58	21
4.	Ayr Bruins	14	8	0	6	67:61	16
5.	Durham Wasps	14	7	1	6	84:80	15
6.	Glasgow Dynamos	14	4	1	9	68:113	9
7.	Paisley Mohawks	14	4	0	10	43:120	8
8.	Dundee Rockets *	14	0	0	14	23:60	0

(*The Dundee Rockets played all games away for four points per match.)

== Southern League ==
=== Regular season ===
==== Midland Section ====
	Club	GP	W	T	L	GF–GA	Pts
1.	Altrincham Aces	16	11	3	2	98:48	25
2.	Liverpool Leopards	16	10	3	3	111:49	23
3.	Blackpool Seagulls	16	11	0	5	160:53	22
4.	Grimsby Buffaloes	16	2	2	12	64:142	6
5.	Sheffield Lancers	16	2	0	14	47:188	4

==== Southern Section ====
	Club	GP	W	T	L	GF–GA	Pts
1.	Streatham Redskins	8	8	0	0	104:11	16
2.	Bristol Redwings	8	6	0	2	62:19	12
3.	Avon Arrows	8	3	0	5	36:43	6
4.	Solihull Barons	8	3	0	5	33:40	6
5.	Deeside Dragons	8	0	0	8	10:132	0

=== Final ===
Streatham Redskins defeated Altrincham Aces 11:0 on aggregate (9:0, 2:0)

== Spring Cup ==
=== Final ===
Fife Flyers defeated the Ayr Bruins

== Icy Smith Cup ==
=== Second round ===
- Ayr Bruins bt Whitley Warriors 7-4
- Durham Wasps bt Murrayfield Racers 6-5
- Fife Flyers bt Paisley Mohawks 17-4
- Streatham Redskins bt Blackpool Seagulls 13-4
- Liverpool Leopards bt Altrincham Aces 3-0

=== Quarter finals ===
- Streatham Redskins bt Liverpool Leopards 15-5
- Ayr Bruins bt Durham Wasps 5-4
- Fife Flyers bt Glasgow Dynamos 10-3
- Bristol Redwings bt Sobell Saints 7-2

=== Semi finals ===
- Streatham Redskins bt Bristol Redwings 12-4
- Ayr Bruins bt Fife Flyers 8-1

=== Final ===
- Ayr Bruins bt Streatham Redskins 5-5 & 9-3 (agg 14-8)

== Autumn Cup ==
	Club	GP	W	L	T	GF	GA	Pts
1.	Fife Flyers	12	9	2	1	114	60	19
2.	Durham Wasps	12	9	2	1	106	60	19
3.	Murrayfield Racers	12	8	3	1	88	58	17
4.	Whitley Bay Warriors	12	6	6	0	86	79	12
5.	Ayr Bruins	12	4	6	2	70	57	10
6.	Glasgow Dynamos	12	2	8	2	60	121	6
7.	Paisley Mohawks	12	0	11	1	36	125	1

- Fife Flyers won the cup by virtue of a better aggregate score between the two sides. Fife won 13-4 at Kirkcaldy, Durham won 7-4 at Durham giving Fife a 17-11 score.
