= 1981–82 Northern League (ice hockey) season =

1981-82 Northern League season

The 1981-82 Northern League season was the 16th and last season of the Northern League, the top level ice hockey league in northern England and Scotland. Eight teams participated in the league, and the Dundee Rockets won the championship. The top four teams qualified for the Spring Cup, which served as the Northern League playoffs. The top two teams, the Dundee Rockets and the Murrayfield Racers, qualified for the British Championship.

== Regular season ==
	Club	GP	W	T	L	GF–GA	Pts
1.	Dundee Rockets	14	13	0	1	149:45	26
2.	Murrayfield Racers	14	9	1	4	111:56	19
3.	Fife Flyers	14	8	0	6	79:85	16
4.	Durham Wasps	14	8	0	6	90:113	16
5.	Glasgow Dynamos	14	5	2	7	72:81	12
6.	Whitley Warriors	14	4	1	9	90:103	9
7.	Billingham Bombers	14	4	1	9	70:118	9
8.	Ayr Bruins	14	2	1	11	72:132	5

== Spring Cup ==
=== Semifinals ===
- Murrayfield Racers - Fife Flyers 3:2, 4:1
- Dundee Rockets - Durham Wasps 24:1, 12:7

=== Final ===
- Dundee Rockets - Murrayfield Racers 10:4, 14:2
