= 1976–77 British Ice Hockey season =

- Sport: ice hockey

Seasons
- ← 1975–76 1977–78 →

The 1976–77 British Ice Hockey season featured the Northern League for teams from Scotland and the north of England and the Southern League for teams from the rest of England.

Fife Flyers won the Northern League and Streatham Redskins won the Southern League. Fife Flyers won the Icy Smith Cup.

== Northern League ==
=== Regular season ===
	Club	GP	W	T	L	GF–GA	Pts
1.	Fife Flyers	14	14	0	0	153:42	28
2.	Whitley Warriors	14	10	0	4	127:68	20
3.	Murrayfield Racers	14	9	0	5	108:75	18
4.	Dundee Rockets *	14	6	2	6	40:46	16
5.	Durham Wasps	14	6	0	8	115:101	12
6.	Glasgow Dynamos	14	5	2	7	85:82	12
7.	Ayr Bruins	14	4	0	10	83:84	8
8.	Paisley Mohawks	14	0	0	14	26:239	0

(*The Dundee Rockets played all games away for four points per match.)

== Southern League ==
=== Regular season ===
==== Midland Section ====
	Club	GP	W	T	L	GF–GA	Pts
1.	Altrincham Aces	10	9	0	1	62:26	18
2.	Blackpool Seagulls	10	8	0	2	65:32	16
3.	Liverpool Leopards	10	6	0	4	38:36	12
4.	Grimsby Buffaloes	10	3	0	7	45:63	6
5.	Deeside Dragons	10	2	0	8	31:51	4
6.	Sheffield Lancers	10	2	0	8	31:64	4

==== Southern Section ====
	Club	GP	W	T	L	GF–GA	Pts
1.	Streatham Redskins	14	14	0	0	139:25	28
2.	Southampton Vikings	14	12	0	2	118:53	24
3.	Cambridge University	14	6	2	6	32:37	14
4.	Avon Arrows	14	7	0	7	60:52	14
5.	London Phoenix Flyers	14	4	3	7	31:89	11
6.	Solihull Barons	14	4	2	8	15:72	10
7.	Streatham Hawks	14	3	1	10	33:66	7
8.	Oxford University	14	1	2	11	27:61	5

=== Final ===
Streatham Redskins defeated Altrincham Aces 12:2 on aggregate (6:2, 6:0)

== Spring Cup ==
=== Final ===
Won by the Fife Flyers

== Icy Smith Cup ==
=== Final ===
Fife Flyers defeated Southampton Vikings 9-5 & 18-6

== Autumn Cup ==
	Club	GP	W	L	T	GF	GA	Pts
1.	Fife Flyers	14	13	1	0	138	47	26
2.	Whitley Bay Warriors	14	11	3	0	147	65	22
3.	Murrayfield Racers	14	8	6	0	115	68	16
4.	Durham Wasps	14	7	7	0	100	98	14
5.	Dundee Rockets*	14	6	6	2	34	43	14
6.	Ayr Bruins	14	5	9	0	70	99	10
7.	Glasgow Dynamos	14	4	8	2	68	104	10
8.	Paisley Mohawks	14	0	14	0	24	172	0

(*Played all games away for four points per match.)
