= 1971–72 British Ice Hockey season =

- Sport: ice hockey

Seasons
- ← 1970–71 1972–73 →

The 1971–72 British Ice Hockey season featured the Northern League for teams from Scotland and the north of England and the Southern League for teams from the rest of England.

Murrayfield Racers won the Northern League and Sussex Senators won the Southern League. Murrayfield Racers won the Icy Smith Cup.

== Northern League ==
=== Regular season ===
| | Club | GP | W | T | L | GF–GA | Pts |
|---|---|---|---|---|---|---|---|
| 1. | Murrayfield Racers | 14 | 12 | 1 | 1 | 114:46 | 25 |
| 2. | Dundee Rockets | 14 | 10 | 1 | 3 | 110:72 | 21 |
| 3. | Whitley Warriors | 14 | 10 | 0 | 4 | 133:73 | 20 |
| 4. | Fife Flyers | 14 | 8 | 2 | 4 | 82:67 | 18 |
| 5. | Glasgow Dynamos | 14 | 5 | 0 | 9 | 64:97 | 10 |
| 6. | Ayr Bruins | 14 | 4 | 0 | 10 | 62:81 | 8 |
| 7. | Durham Wasps | 14 | 3 | 0 | 11 | 69:118 | 6 |
| 8. | Paisley Mohawks | 14 | 2 | 0 | 12 | 39:119 | 4 |

== Southern League ==
=== Regular season ===
| | Club | GP | W | T | L | GF–GA | Pts |
|---|---|---|---|---|---|---|---|
| 1. | Sussex Senators | 10 | 8 | 1 | 1 | 69:31 | 17 |
| 2. | Wembley Vets | 10 | 7 | 0 | 3 | 57:49 | 14 |
| 3. | Altrincham Aces | 10 | 6 | 1 | 3 | 59:40 | 13 |
| 4. | Bristol Redwings | 10 | 4 | 0 | 6 | 48:44 | 8 |
| 5. | Blackpool Seagulls | 10 | 4 | 0 | 6 | 49:58 | 8 |
| 6. | Solihull Vikings | 10 | 0 | 0 | 10 | 22:82 | 0 |

== Spring Cup ==
=== Final ===
Murrayfield Racers defeated the Dundee Rockets

== Icy Smith Cup ==
=== Final ===
Murrayfield Racers defeated Fife Flyers 18-5

== Autumn Cup ==
| | Club | GP | W | L | T | GF | GA | Pts |
|---|---|---|---|---|---|---|---|---|
| 1. | Whitley Bay Warriors | 14 | 12 | 2 | 0 | 136 | 47 | 24 |
| 2. | Murrayfield Racers | 14 | 11 | 2 | 1 | 150 | 61 | 23 |
| 3. | Dundee Rockets | 14 | 10 | 3 | 1 | 128 | 63 | 21 |
| 4. | Ayr Bruins | 14 | 7 | 7 | 0 | 89 | 87 | 14 |
| 5. | Fife Flyers | 14 | 6 | 8 | 0 | 72 | 77 | 12 |
| 6. | Glasgow Dynamos | 14 | 4 | 10 | 0 | 58 | 116 | 8 |
| 7. | Durham Wasps | 14 | 3 | 11 | 0 | 59 | 132 | 6 |
| 8. | Paisley Mohawks | 14 | 2 | 12 | 0 | 36 | 145 | 4 |
