= 1972–73 British Ice Hockey season =

- Sport: ice hockey

Seasons
- ← 1971–72 1973–74 →

The 1972–73 British Ice Hockey season featured the Northern League for teams from Scotland and the north of England and the Southern League for teams from the rest of England.

Dundee Rockets won the Northern League and Altrincham Aces won the Southern League. Whitley Warriors won the Icy Smith Cup.

== Northern League ==
=== Regular season ===
	Club	GP	W	T	L	GF–GA	Pts
1.	Dundee Rockets	12	10	1	1	107:51	21
2.	Murrayfield Racers	12	8	1	3	89:51	17
3.	Whitley Warriors	12	7	1	4	95:63	15
4.	Fife Flyers	12	6	0	6	79:65	12
5.	Glasgow Dynamos	12	4	0	8	50:101	8
6.	Durham Wasps	12	2	2	8	69:92	6
7.	Paisley Mohawks	12	2	1	9	31:97	5

== Southern League ==
=== Regular season ===
	Club	GP	W	T	L	GF–GA	Pts
1.	Altrincham Aces	12	9	1	2	70:38	19
2.	Bristol Redwings	12	8	1	3	76:37	17
3.	Wembley Vets	12	8	0	4	70:32	16
4.	Sussex Tigers	12	6	0	6	69:60	12
5.	Solihull Barons	12	3	2	7	32:75	8
6.	Solihull Vikings	12	2	1	9	38:67	5
7.	Blackpool Seagulls	12	2	1	9	47:93	5

== Spring Cup ==
=== Final ===
Murrayfield Racers defeated the Dundee Rockets

== Icy Smith Cup ==
=== Final ===
Whitley Warriors defeated Murrayfield Racers 21-9

== Autumn Cup ==
	Club	GP	W	L	T	GF	GA	Pts
1.	Fife Flyers	12	10	0	2	114	58	22
2.	Whitley Bay Warriors	12	8	4	0	127	51	16
3.	Murrayfield Racers	12	7	3	2	91	61	16
4.	Dundee Rockets	12	6	4	2	107	75	14
5.	Durham Wasps	12	4	8	0	70	110	8
6.	Paisley Mohawks	12	2	10	0	25	91	4
7.	Glasgow Dynamos	12	2	10	0	43	131	4
