= 1969–70 British Ice Hockey season =

- Sport: ice hockey

Seasons
- ← 1968–69 1970–71 →

The 1969–70 British Ice Hockey season featured the Northern League for teams from Scotland and the north of England. Murrayfield Racers won the Icy Smith Cup.

== Northern League ==
=== Regular season ===
	Club	GP	W	T	L	GF–GA	Pts
1.	Murrayfield Racers	18	15	1	2	141:45	31
2.	Paisley Mohawks	18	11	2	5	111:90	24
3.	Whitley Warriors	18	11	2	5	130:106	24
4.	Glasgow Dynamos	18	9	3	6	107:85	21
5.	Dundee Rockets	18	9	2	7	86:93	20
6.	Durham Wasps	18	7	5	6	119:127	19
7.	Ayr Bruins	18	6	0	12	81:90	12
8.	Edinburgh Royals	18	5	1	12	74:111	11
9.	Whitley Bay Bandits	18	4	3	11	85:137	11
10.	Fife Flyers	18	2	3	13	63:118	7

== Spring Cup ==
=== Final ===
Glasgow Dynamos defeated the Murrayfield Racers

== Icy Smith Cup ==
=== Semi finals ===
Team 1	Team 2	Score
Glasgow Dynamos	Edinburgh Royals	8-5

=== Final ===
Team 1	Team 2	Score
Murrayfield Racers	Glasgow Dynamos	4-5 10-4 (14-9 agg)

== Autumn Cup ==
=== Results ===
	Club	GP	W	T	L	GF–GA	Pts
1.	Murrayfield Racers	18					
2.	Paisley Mohawks	18					
3.	Whitley Warriors	18					
4.	Glasgow Dynamos	18	9	3	6		
5.	Durham Wasps	18					
6.	Fife Flyers	18					
7.	Dundee Rockets	18					
8.	Ayr Bruins	18					
9.	Whitley Bay Bandits	18					
10.	Edinburgh Royals	18					
