= 1980–81 Northern League (ice hockey) season =

British ice hockey league season

1980-81 Northern League season

The 1980-81 Northern League season was the 15th season of the Northern League, the top level ice hockey league in northern England and Scotland. Eight teams participated in the league, and the Murrayfield Racers won the championship. The top four teams qualified for the Spring Cup, which served as the Northern League playoffs.

== Regular season ==
	Club	GP	W	T	L	GF–GA	Pts
1.	Murrayfield Racers	28	27	0	1	262:83	54
2.	Billingham Bombers	28	22	0	6	218:139	44
3.	Durham Wasps	28	16	1	11	192:150	33
4.	Fife Flyers	28	15	2	11	231:145	32
5.	Glasgow Dynamos	28	11	3	14	143:144	25
6.	Whitley Warriors	28	8	1	19	137:231	17
7.	Ayr Bruins	28	6	1	21	114:225	13
8.	Aviemore Blackhawks	28	3	0	25	88:268	6

== Spring Cup ==
=== Semifinals ===
- Murrayfield Racers - Fife Flyers 7:5, 8:3
- Billingham Bombers - Durham Wasps 11:5, 6:4

=== Final ===
The final between the Murrayfield Racers and the Billingham Bombers was not contested.
