= 1979–80 Northern League (ice hockey) season =

1979-80 Northern League season

The 1979-80 Northern League season was the 14th season of the Northern League, the top level ice hockey league in northern England and Scotland. Nine teams participated in the league, and the Murrayfield Racers won the championship. The top four teams qualified for the Spring Cup, which served as the Northern League playoffs.

== Regular season ==
	Club	GP	W	T	L	GF–GA	Pts
1.	Murrayfield Racers	16	15	1	0	149:47	31
2.	Billingham Bombers	16	14	1	1	162:66	29
3.	Whitley Warriors	16	6	3	7	86:90	15
4.	Glasgow Dynamos	16	7	1	8	80:93	15
5.	Fife Flyers	16	5	3	8	94:100	13
6.	Durham Wasps	16	5	1	10	83:106	11
7.	Aviemore Blackhawks	16	4	3	9	88:120	11
8.	Sunderland Chiefs	16	4	2	10	78:126	10
9.	Ayr Bruins	16	4	1	11	77:149	9

== Spring Cup ==
=== Semifinals ===
- Billingham Bombers - Whitley Warriors 9:7, 5:3
- Murrayfield Racers - Glasgow Dynamos 7:2, 8:1

=== Final ===
The final between the Murrayfield Racers and the Billingham Bombers was not contested.
