= 1967–68 British Ice Hockey season =

- Sport: ice hockey

Seasons
- ← 1966–67 1968–69 →

The 1967–68 British Ice Hockey season featured the Northern League for teams from Scotland and the north of England. It had been known as the Scottish League during 1966-67.

Paisley Mohawks won the Northern League the Icy Smith Cup and the Autumn Cup.

== Northern League ==
=== Regular season ===
	Club	GP	W	T	L	GF–GA	Pts
1.	Paisley Mohawks	10	9	0	1	70:39	18
2.	Fife Flyers	10	6	0	4	52:55	12
3.	Murrayfield Racers	10	5	1	4	62:49	11
4.	Whitley Warriors	10	3	2	5	55:64	8
5.	Glasgow Dynamos	10	3	1	6	48:65	7
6.	Durham Wasps	10	2	0	8	41:56	4

== Spring Cup ==
=== Final ===
Paisley Mohawks defeated the Whitley Warriors 12:9 on aggregate (7:7, 5:2)

== Icy Smith Cup Final ==
Paisley Mohawks defeated Durham Wasps by a score of 12–11 in the Icy Smith Cup Final, which was a tournament that was the forerunner of the British Championship playoffs.

== Autumn Cup ==
=== Results ===
	Club	GP	W	L	T	GF	GA	Pts
1.	Paisley Mohawks	10	10	0	0	66	24	20
2.	Murrayfield Racers	10	6	3	1	61	31	13
3.	Glasgow Dynamos	10	4	5	1	45	41	9
4.	Fife Flyers	10	4	5	1	57	56	9
5.	Durham Wasps	10	3	6	1	44	81	7
6.	Whitley Bay Warriors	10	0	8	2	29	69	2
