= Relocation of sports teams in the United Kingdom =

Relocation of professional sports teams in the United Kingdom is a practice that involves a sports team moving from one metropolitan area to another, although occasionally moves between municipalities in the same conurbation are also included. For relocations in other part of the world see Relocation of professional sports teams.

In British sport, the relocation of teams away from their traditional districts is unusual because of the nature of the relationship between clubs and their fans: the local football club is regarded by most English football supporters as part of the local identity and social fabric rather than as a business that can be transplanted by its owners at will. As a result, any relocation plan would be strongly opposed by fans in the club's original area, and unlikely to succeed in most new locations due to the existence of established teams in most towns and cities that would already have secured the loyalty of native supporters. John Bale, summarising a study published in 1974, writes that, in the view of most fans, "Chelsea would simply not be Chelsea" were that club to move a few miles within the same borough to Wormwood Scrubs.

However, there have been examples of club relocations, primarily motivated by difficult financial situations or problems with the home ground. So far, excluding association football teams, this article lists 48 relocated teams and 84 changes in identity in total.

== Basketball ==
=== England ===
==== Bolton & Bury Giants → Olympic City Giants ====
Olympic City Giants were a professional basketball team based in Oldham. Previously based in Bolton and Bury, the team were known as Bolton & Bury Hawks and then Bolton & Bury Giants, the team were founder members of the British Basketball League in 1987. In 1989 after encountering several financial difficulties, Olympic City Giants formally merged with Manchester Eagles (formerly Manchester United) to become Manchester Giants, marking a return of the famous name after a three-year absence, following a merger between the original Manchester Giants and Manchester United in 1986.

==== Brighton Bears → Worthing Bears → Brighton Bears ====
The Brighton Bears founded in 1973, were rocked by financial instability by the early 1980s. High rents at the Brighton Centre combined with dwindling crowds meant that it was no longer financially viable for the team to operate out of Brighton, and the search for a new home began. The second half of the season saw home games being played in arenas all over the south, including Bognor Regis, Eastleigh and Hastings.

The Bears' first game at Worthing was against the Birmingham Bullets in December 1983. A crowd of 400 curious onlookers turned up to watch the game, and the passion and excitement generated made the directors choose Worthing as the new permanent home for the Bears. The rent of the Leisure Centre was agreed with Worthing Borough Council and fans decided to stick with the Bears name. The club began the 1984–85 season as the Worthing Bears.

Several years later, after finishing rock-bottom of the league in the 1998–99 season, with only 4 wins out of 36 starts, late in the season Bob Wood sold his share of the club to Romek Kriwald, and as the season drew to a close the announcement was made that the Bears were to leave Worthing and head back to Brighton. The increased revenue and TV exposure that a venue such as the Brighton Centre could bring were seen as the only route back to success for the Bears. The club's first year back in Brighton was a marked improvement on the previous years' decline. The club returned to the Brighton Bears name in 1999 and home games were once again held at the Brighton Centre, as well as at the Burgess Hill Triangle, and attendances peaked at close to 3,000. The Worthing Rebels filled the void left by the Bears back in Worthing.

==== Brixton TopCats → Lambeth TopCats → Brixton TopCats ====
The Brixton TopCats, based in Brixton, London, briefly relocated for one season, 1986–87 season, to nearby Lambeth changing their name accordingly.

==== Derbyshire Arrows → City of Sheffield Arrows → Derbyshire Arrows ====
The Derbyshire Arrows water founded in Killamarsh, Derbyshire. In 2003 to allow the club to advance further, they moved to the English Institute of Sport in Sheffield, Yorkshire, changing their name to the City of Sheffield Arrows. The move proved successful trophy-wise, but since winning their last title in 2005, the club began a gradual decline. With the drop to a more modest league, the club returned to their original Killamarsh home and reclaimed their former name in 2011.

==== Ellesmere Port Jets → Chester Jets ====
Founded in 1984 in Ellesmere Port as Ellesmere Port Jets, in the 1987–88 season, they changed their name to Cheshire Jets (a name which they returned to in 2007), though still continuing to play in Ellesmere Port. As the team gained promotion to the BBL, the arena in Ellesmere Port became unsuitable, and so in 1993 the Jets were forced to move to Chester, and into the Northgate Arena. The move was reflected in another name change to the Chester Jets.

==== EPAB Washington → Sunderland Scorpions → Newcastle Comets ====
EPAB Washington founded in 1977 in Washington, moved to Sunderland after just one season to become Sunderland Saints. Renamed in 1993 to Sunderland Scorpions they moved to Newcastle in 1995, becoming the Newcastle Comets, which would later become the successful Newcastle Eagles.

==== Hemel Hempstead Lakers → Watford Royals → MK Lions → London Lions ====
The London Lions currently play in the British Basketball League – the top level men's basketball league in the United Kingdom. The club had been based in Hemel Hempstead, Watford and Milton Keynes prior to its re-location to London for the 2012–13 season.

The club was formed as the Hemel Hempstead Lakers in 1977 before being renamed Hemel Royals in 1985. The lack of fortunes and an ageing venue prompted the franchise to look at relocating and found a suitable, yet temporary solution in the neighbouring town of Watford. In preparation for the move, the franchise was rebranded as Hemel & Watford Royals in 1996 and made the move from the Dacorum Centre to Watford Leisure Centre in 1997. The move had little luck on the team's playing performance and they finished 13th out of 13 in the 1997–98 season (3–33). Royals' stay in Watford lasted just one season and, in 1998, with the promise of a future purpose-built arena being offered in the town of Milton Keynes, the team packed up, moved and renamed themselves as the Milton Keynes Lions.

The move to Milton Keynes was a great success, winning the franchise's only trophy success to-date is the BBL Cup title, won in 2008 as the Milton Keynes Lions.

Following the conclusion of the 2011–12 season, the owners of Prestige Homes Arena triggered an opt-out clause in the lease to let the building as a retail outlet. A planning application to change the building from a sporting facility to retail unit was approved by Milton Keynes Council, thus leaving the club without a home venue for the third time in as many seasons. Owner Vince Macaulay searched during the summer of 2012 to secure a new base for Lions home games, which included public pleas to local businesses for help in finding a new home as offers from cities around the UK poured in to relocate the team. On 30 July, it was announced that the search for a home venue had been unsuccessful and the club would be forced to leave Milton Keynes.

The move in 2012 to London was fiercely criticised by fans and the general local population. The club still operate the Milton Keynes College Lions Basketball Academy in partnership with Milton Keynes College, which was established in 2007 and remains running despite the professional team's departure from Milton Keynes in the summer of 2012.

==== London YMCA Metros → Kingston Kings → Glasgow Rangers → Kingston Kings → Guildford Kings ====
The franchise's origins date back to the London YMCA Metros who entered the National Basketball League in 1973. In 1979, owner Malcolm Chamberlain uprooted the team and relocated them from London to the suburbs of Kingston upon Thames and to the Tolworth Recreation Centre, and rebranding as Kingston Kings.

In 1988, the franchise was bought out by Rangers F.C., and became the Glasgow Rangers, although the team played in Falkirk. Rangers were League Champions in 1988–89, but were sold after just one year and returned to Kingston, where the franchise enjoyed their most glorious period. In 1992 the franchise was moved yet again to the brand new Spectrum Arena in Guildford to become the Guildford Kings. The Kings competed for two more years in the British Basketball League and even European competitions, until 1994, when the franchise folded completely due to financial difficulties. The league sold Kings' licence to a group headed by Robert Earl, Ed Simons and Harvey Goldsmith, who went on to establish the equally successful Greater London Leopards franchise.

==== Loughborough All-Stars → Leicester All-Stars ====
Founded as the Loughborough All-Stars in 1967, making it the oldest operating basketball team in the UK, the club moved from Loughborough to Leicester in 1981, backed by Leicester City Council and Leicester City Bus, hence the change in nickname to "Riders" in 1986, becoming the Leicester Riders. They briefly moving back to play at Loughborough University in 2000, following the closure of Granby Halls, at a new venue barely a stone's throw from Victory Hall where the club played its first game, but the club did not change its name. In 2004 the Riders agreed a sponsorship deal with De Montfort University and moved back to Leicester, where they played their games at De Monfort's John Sandford Sports Centre.

==== Rossendale Raptors → Lancashire Spinners ====
The Rossendale Raptors, based in Rossendale, with the goal of establishing themselves at national level complete, the club relocated to the Castle Leisure Centre in Bury and re-branded themselves as the Lancashire Spinners in 2014 to attract a wider audience and to prepare for a future push towards the professional leagues.

==== Sportsworld Market Harborough → Corby Flyers → Coventry Flyers ====
Founded as Sportsworld Market Harborough in 1987, the club were nomadic during their formative years, only remaining in their original venue for a year before relocating to Corby, where they adopted the name Corby Flyers, and then moving to Coventry after a further two years. Stability started to come to the club in the 1992–93 season when they re-branded as the Coventry Crusaders.

==== Stockport Belgrade → Warrington Vikings → Manchester United ====
Stockport Belgrade were a successful club created in 1975, based at Peel Moat in Heaton Moor. But by the 1981–82 season, the Stockport club took the decision to move away from their fan base to the new Spectrum Arena in Warrington, adopting the name Warrington Vikings. Halfway through the 1998–99 season, another major turning point occurred in the Viking's eventful history when Manchester United bought the team. Two barren seasons followed the United title win and the United experiment having failed, the franchise was bought by a group of local businessmen in 1988, who changed the team name to the Manchester Eagles. The club suffered a complicated intertwining with the other Manchester club, the original Manchester Giants with several mergers taking place.

==== Southampton Trailblazers ====
In 2007, the Trailblazers became the leading club in Southampton, and were permitted to move from their St. Mary's home venue to Fleming Park Leisure Centre in Eastleigh.

==== Southern Pirates → Guildford Pirates → Bracknell Pirates ====
The franchise started out as the Southern Pirates, playing in the city of Portsmouth, however they were soon moved inland in 1975 to the town of Guildford retaining its name at first before being renamed Guildford Pirates. In 1982, the Pirates moved again to nearby Bracknell, becoming the Bracknell Pirates and later renamed the Bracknell Tigers and then eventually Thames Valley Tigers. In the new millennium that the successes dried up and for owner John Nike the team was too much of a financial burden. In April 2005, he announced that he would no longer be funding the basketball franchise nor his ice hockey franchise Bracknell Bees. Fans of the Thames Valley Tigers set up a phoenix club Guildford Heat in 2005, after successful negotiations with the Spectrum Arena in Guildford.

==== Tolworth Reckers → Chessington Wildcats ====
Although relocating only within the London Borough of Kingston upon Thames, the team founded as the Tolworth Reckers in 1983 moved the short distance from Tolworth Recreation Centre to Chessington Sports Centre in 1993, becoming the Chessington Wildcats. The team alternated venues several times since then, but the team continues to exist as the Kingston Wildcats

==== Ware Fire → Essex Leopards ====
The team was established in 1997 as Ware Fire, in Ware, Hertfordshire.

In the summer of 2003 it was announced that British Basketball League (BBL) team, and twice former League champions, Essex Leopards would be dropping out of the League as a buyer for the struggling franchise could not be found. A supporters group called "Leopards Alive" was set up in September 2003, aiming to resurrect the Leopards franchise and bring professional basketball back to their base in Brentwood. Initially seeking to enter a team into the BBL, the supporters group opted for the English Basketball League after realising that "without a major backer, the expense of running a professional team in the BBL was too great." It was formally announced in May 2004 that the Leopards Alive organisation and the Ware Rebels were merging for the 2004–05 season, and be re-branded as the Essex & Herts Leopards, taking the names of both counties (Essex and Hertfordshire) they would be representing.

The 2006–07 season saw another major rebranding for the franchise as the club was renamed as London Leopards in an effort to attract a bigger fanbase from Britain's capital city, whilst following a disagreement with the new owners of the club's home venue, the Brentwood Centre, the Leopards would play all home games back at Wodson Park or the Goresbrook Centre. Following a merge with Barking Abbey Basketball Academy in 2010, a BA prefix was added to reflect this. In 2012, the club was rebranded as Essex Leopards and currently play in the English Basketball League Division 1.

==== West Hertfordshire Warriors → Watford Storm → Edmonton Storm → Hemel Storm ====
The club was formed in 2006 as a feeder club for the West Hertfordshire Warriors, Hatfield, Hertfordshire. Early in the following season, the parent team resigned from Division One due to financial difficulties, leaving the second team to carry on the name alone, but the club continued to a fourth-place finish despite the off-court upheavals.

The newly independent club moved their home venue to Watford's Westfield Community Sports Centre (in Watford) for the 2008–09 season, the move bringing the club a new name, Watford Storm and another third-place finish. However, problems with the Westfield venue led to the club playing in Edmonton by the end of the season, leading to another short-term move to North London for the 2009–10 season, and a further name change to the Edmonton Storm. Finally, the club moved one final time to Hemel Hempstead ahead of the 2010–11 season, renaming themselves the Hemel Storm and bringing basketball back to the town after a 13-year absence.

=== Scotland ===
==== Edinburgh → Livingston ====
Livingston, moved from Meadowbank Arena, Edinburgh to Forum Arena, Livingston in 1987, changing their name accordingly. Under the Livingston name they became one of the most successful and popular teams in Britain, before folding after just two years.

==== Edinburgh Rocks → Scottish Rocks ====
Established as the Edinburgh Rocks in 1998 by a consortium of businessmen, the team debuted at the Meadowbank Arena under the helm of American coach Jim Brandon. After poor results, in the summer of 2002, the team was attracted by the opening of the brand-new 4,000-seat Braehead Arena in Glasgow, Rocks uprooted from their aging Meadowbank venue in Edinburgh and moved 45 miles west to Scotland's largest city, and rebranded as the Scottish Rocks. The move received a mixed response from fans, whilst many said that the move would not work, the official supporters club backed the franchise's decision.

While few fans followed the club west, the first season in Glasgow provided the franchise with a sponsorship deal with Mitsubishi and its most successful season to date, as coach Wall led the Rocks to their first ever trophy, the BBL Play-off Championship. The team currently play in the BBL under the name Glasgow Rocks.

==== Penilee B.C. → Paisley B.C. ====
Founded in 1963 as Penilee B.C. in Penilee, a suburb of Glasgow, the club moved to Paisley in 1972 becoming Paisley B.C.

==== Troon Tornadoes → Ayrshire Tornadoes ====
Troon Basketball Club founded in 1991, played home games at Marr College, Troon before changing their name to Ayrshire Tornadoes in 2015 and moving around Ayrshire as a result; currently they mostly play in Dalry.

== Ice Hockey ==
=== England ===
==== Durham Wasps → Newcastle Cobras ====
The Durham Wasps began their prosperous start to hockey just after the war. Ice hockey remained popular in the sixties and seventies, but it exploded with popularity between the eighties and nineties, and the period from around 1982 to 1992 enjoyed a highly successful period. There was an intense local rivalry with both the Whitley Warriors and the Billingham Bombers. It was a golden period for hockey in the North East with derby matches against the Warriors often resulting in crowds which exceeded the stated capacity of the rink by a considerable margin.

With the rise of teams such as the Cardiff Devils and Sheffield Steelers, the Wasps started to struggle to fund a competitive team. At the same time, the rink was in need of significant investment. Around this time, John Hall, then owner of Newcastle United Football Club, laid plans to form a centre of sporting excellence in Newcastle. As part of this he purchased the team with the intention of moving them to a new ice rink in Newcastle. In the meanwhile, the team temporarily played out of the Crowtree Leisure Centre in Sunderland.

This proved very divisive amongst Wasps fans with many to this day refusing to watch ice hockey in Newcastle. A replacement team was established in Durham called the Durham City Wasps who played in the English League. This featured some players who the new Wasps owners decided not to retain, as well as players from the junior teams. Unfortunately the team only lasted one season before the costs of maintaining the rink came to a head and the rink was sold to be redeveloped.

The plans for a new rink in Newcastle came to nothing so a deal was made which resulted in the Whitley Warriors being evicted from the Telewest Arena to make way for the team. After a season of playing out of Crowtree, Wasps were taken to Newcastle and renamed the Newcastle Cobras. In the next few years they changed owners and names from the Cobras, to the Riverkings, to the Jesters, however, the franchise folded soon after.

==== MK Kings → Solihull MK Kings ====
Milton Keynes Kings were an Ice Hockey team based in Milton Keynes from 1990 to 1996 in the British Hockey League (BHL), and from 1998 to 2002 in the English Premier Ice Hockey League (EPIHL). Following a dispute with the Planet Ice Arena in Milton Keynes, the team relocated to Solihull, where they became Solihull MK Kings for a while. The team was wound up in May 2003.

The Solihull franchise was taken by the new Solihull Barons in 1996.

Milton Keynes Lightning took over the semi-professional league spot at Planet Ice left by MK Kings soon after.

==== Newcastle Vipers ====
The Newcastle Vipers were founded in 2002 to keep the city's ice hockey heritage alive after the demise of the Newcastle Jesters However, due to low crowds and problems getting regular ice time at the Newcastle Arena, in November 2010 the Vipers were forced to move in with rivals Whitley Warriors and play for part of their final season out of the Hillheads rink in Whitley Bay. On 6 May 2011, the EIHL confirmed that the Vipers would fold and not take part in the 2011–12 season after months of financial difficulty, leaving the North East with no top flight Ice Hockey club for 2011–12. GM Jaimie Longmuir said he was "Incredibly sad to confirm that the Vipers will no longer participate in the Elite League following Tuesday's meeting."

==== Romford Raiders → London Raiders ====
The Romford Raiders became the London Raiders after the Romford Ice Arena was sold by Havering Council to investors. The team subsequently had to move to Lee Valley Ice Centre and became the London Raiders.

==== Solihull Barons → Coventry Blaze ====
The original Solihull Barons founded in 1965, evolved into Solihull Blaze before the start of the 1996–97 season. In May 2000, the club announced that they would be heading to new a new 3,600-seater stadium, the Coventry SkyDome Arena, for the 2000–01 BNL campaign; renaming themselves Coventry Blaze in the process. This was done for the purpose of attracting a larger fan base to the team. A new Solihull Barons was formed in 2005 as a phoenix club.

=== Scotland ===
==== Ayr Scottish Eagles → Braehead Clan ====
The owner of the Ayr Scottish Eagles, Bill Barr, in August 2002 announced that the team were to permanently relocate to the Braehead Arena in Renfrewshire, outside Glasgow, from their traditional home in Ayr.

Bob Zeller, Belfast Giants' founder was announced as managing director and the team changed their name to Scottish Eagles, dropping "Ayr" from their name. Bob Zeller remained a shareholder in the Belfast Giants. The reason given for the relocation was due to the Braehead Arena having a larger seating capacity and a larger catchment area, expected to increase the fanbase of the club.

The club (with the new name) folded on 14 November 2002, after just six home games, in what was to become the final season of the Ice Hockey Superleague.

When the Superleague's successor, the Elite Ice Hockey League was formed, initial plans included a new Glasgow-based team as being amongst the founding clubs, but this never materialised.

Following the 2008–09 season, the Elite League lost two teams with the resignations of the Basingstoke Bison and Manchester Phoenix, leaving the league with eight participating teams for the 2009–10 season. The Elite League subsequently announced the formation of the Braehead Clan as a ninth team for beginning with the 2010–11 season. The team's ownership was announced as consisting of several of the Elite League's existing team owners, including Nottingham's Neil Black.

== Motorcycle Speedway ==
=== Active teams ===
==== Glasgow Tigers → Coatbridge Tigers → Glasgow Tigers → Workington Tigers → Glasgow Tigers ====
Glasgow Speedway was formed in 1928 and were initially based at the White City Stadium on Paisley Road West in Ibrox, Glasgow (close to Rangers F.C.'s Ibrox Stadium). Other venues were also operating open meetings around this time at Carntyne Greyhound Stadium, Celtic Park and Nelson Athletic Grounds in the Gallowgate area of Glasgow. The club underwent few cross-city moves and name changes before they chose the name Glasgow Tigers.

In 1973 the club moved to Coatbridge and became the Coatbridge Tigers, riding at Cliftonhill, home of Albion Rovers F. C. The Tigers remained there until they moved to Blantyre in the middle of the 1977 season and re-introduced the name Glasgow Tigers. The Tigers rode in two stadiums in Blantyre, firstly at Blantyre Sports Stadium which was a greyhound stadium. This stadium was demolished in advance of the construction of the East Kilbride Expressway and the Tigers moved in 1982 to Craighead Park.

In 1987 the Tigers moved to Derwent Park in Workington and although they started the year named as Glasgow, they were renamed Workington Tigers for the rest of what was an uncompleted season. This was the only time in the team's history that they have been based in England. In 1988, the club returned to Glasgow when they moved into Shawfield Stadium, Rutherglen.

The Tigers remained at Shawfield with the exception of the 1996 season when the poorly supported Scottish Monarchs rode there in top flight speedway. In 1999 the club moved to its current home at the Ashfield Stadium in Possilpark when the speedway track replaced an old greyhound racing track.

==== Rayleigh Rockets → Rye House Rockets ====
The Rayleigh Rockets rode at the Rayleigh Weir Stadium in Rayleigh, Essex, until 1973 when it was announced that the stadium had been sold to developers and the Rockets would need to find a new home. Len Silver took the Rockets to Hoddesdon in Hertfordshire to start the 1974 season as the Rye House Rockets. The former site of Rayleigh Stadium is now a retail park. The Rye House Rockets Speedway team have been racing at the Rye House Stadium next to the River Lea continuously since 1974.

=== Defunct teams ===
==== Rochester Bombers → Romford Bombers → West Ham Bombers → Barrow Bombers ====
The Romford Bombers had originally started the season at Rochester in Kent and entered the league as the Rochester Bombers. However the local council suddenly ruled against planning permission and the clubs promoters Wally Mawdsley and Pete Lansdale were able to use the Brooklands Stadium in Romford.

The promotion was quite successful but one vociferous local resident obtained a court order closing the track due to noise pollution. The promotion transferred to the West Ham Stadium and renamed the team the West Ham Bombers for the 1972 season but finished the season after moving again, this time to Barrow-in-Furness in Cumbria and were renamed the Barrow Bombers.

==== Crayford Kestrels → Hackney Kestrels ====
The Crayford Kestrels moved in 1983 from the Crayford Stadium in Crayford, Kent, to the Hackney Wick Stadium in Hackney, London, becoming the Hackney Kestrels.

==== Belle Vue Colts → Rochdale Hornets → Ellesmere Port Gunners ====
The Belle Vue Colts were the junior youth development team of the popular Manchester team Belle Vue Aces. In 1970 the Belle Vue management looked for a new home for their nursery team, and this was found just up the road at Rochdale where the Colts moved – still under the control of Belle Vue – to become the Rochdale Hornets. The team arrived in 1970 but moved on to Ellesmere Port at the end of the 1971 season to become the Ellesmere Port Gunners.

==== Halifax Dukes → Bradford Dukes ====
The Halifax Dukes were reinstated in 1965 after a lengthy absence of speedway in the town, and the sport returned to The Shay when Reg Fearman moved his Middlesbrough promotion. The new team opened to big attendances as the sport hit another 'boom' period and the 'Dukes' popularity was re-enforced by winning the British League Championship and KO Cup in only their second year of operation, 1966. By the early 1970s, the Dukes were enjoying higher attendances than the Shaymen (Halifax Town). However, by the mid-1980s, Halifax Dukes and Halifax Town had financial disagreements and in 1986 The Dukes left The Shay and Halifax, moving to Bradford's Odsal Stadium to become the Bradford Dukes.

==== Newport Wasps → Bristol Bulldogs ====
The Newport Wasps competed in the top British league between 1964 and 1976 and were based at the now-defunct Somerton Park stadium, Newport. The club closed in 1976 after becoming the Bristol Bulldogs for one season in 1977, re-instating the Bristol Bulldogs historical team name, however, the club folded after just one season.

== Rugby league ==
=== England ===
==== Blackpool Borough → Springfield Borough → Chorley Borough → Trafford Borough → Blackpool Gladiators ====
Blackpool Borough were accepted into the Rugby League for the 1954–55 season and played at Blackpool's St Anne's Road Greyhound Stadium, although larger fixtures were played at Blackpool F.C.'s Bloomfield Road Stadium. In April 1982, Borough were put into liquidation less than nine months after being taken over by a Cardiff businessman. A new company, Savoy Sports and Leisure Ltd, then bought the club and a new Blackpool Borough RLFC was formed on 4 August 1982 and accepted into the Rugby League for the new season. The club was ordered to carry out safety measures on the ground by Lancashire County Council by 1 February 1987 or quit the ground. Blackpool failed to get a safety grant aid of £65,000 from Blackpool Borough Council and were forced to leave. The final game at Borough Park being on 4 January 1987 when a crowd of 386 saw the club lose 8–5 to Whitehaven. Their final six home games were played at Bloomfield Road.

A different consortium took over the club in April 1987 on condition that Borough left Blackpool. Their first new home was Springfield Park, the then home of Wigan Athletic. Wigan RLFC were rumoured to have objected to the proposed Wigan Borough name and so Springfield Borough was adopted. Springfield Borough's club colours were dark blue, tangerine and white. The club logo was the same as the crest used by Wigan Athletic F.C. at the time.

The club relocated to Victory Park in Chorley and played as Chorley Borough in the 1988–89 season. The club's colours initially consisted of black and white hooped jerseys, which changed later to a primarily black jersey with irregular white bands around the waist and on the sleeves. The club ended up finishing sixteenth out of twenty teams in the Second Division.

Borough then became Trafford Borough when they moved to Moss Lane, Altrincham, sharing with Altrincham F.C. for the 1989–90 season. This, however, caused a boardroom split leading to five Blackpool-based directors resigning to form a new club based initially bases in Chorley, but later became the Blackpool Panthers, who used name Chorley Borough between 1990 and 1995, and are widely regarded as a phoenix club of the team.

Meanwhile, Trafford Borough adopted the local Trafford crest also used by Trafford F.C. Their tenure at Altrincham was generally unsuccessful, with most home crowds averaging around the 200 mark. Trafford Borough survived three seasons before returning to Blackpool, sharing Blackpool Mechanics F.C.'s ground, as Blackpool Gladiators in September 1992, adopting their traditional tangerine, purple and white jerseys, black shorts and socks. The club was beset by financial problems and successive relegations, playing their last games as a professional club on 11 April 1993. Eventually, the club folded in 1997.

==== Broughton Rangers → Belle Vue Rangers ====
Broughton Rangers were founded in 1877, in Broughton, Greater Manchester. The club's headquarters were located at the Bridge Inn on Lower Broughton Road and home games were played at Wheater's Field. From 1892 the headquarters was the Grosvenor Hotel on the corner of Great Clowes Street and Clarence Street. In 1933, Broughton Rangers moved to Belle Vue Stadium, east of the city to Gorton, Manchester, inside the speedway track. After the war, in 1946–47, Broughton was renamed Belle Vue Rangers. The club folded in 1955.

==== Chorley Chieftains → Lancashire Lynx → Chorley Lynx ====
When the original Chorley Borough, founded as Blackpool Borough, relocated from Victory Park in Chorley to Moss Lane, Altrincham, becoming Trafford Borough, it caused a boardroom split leading to five Blackpool-based directors resigning to form a new club based in Chorley, thus giving birth to a new Chorley Borough. They were renamed Chorley Chieftains in 1995.

However, in 1996 they were bought by Preston North End football club and they moved to the Deepdale stadium. and they became the Lancashire Lynx at the start of 1997.

The club was sold on 6 October 2000 to Chorley Sporting Club Ltd which also included Chorley F.C. The club's name was changed again, this time to Chorley Lynx and they returned to Victory Park. At the end of the 2004 season Chorley Lynx folded due to poor attendances and the withdrawal of funding by backer Trevor Hemmings. They were losing £1,000 a week with an average crowd of just 434.

==== Fulham R.L.F.C. → London Crusaders → London Broncos → Harlequins R.L. → London Broncos ====
In June 1980, Fulham Football Club chairman Ernie Clay, set up a rugby league team at Craven Cottage, with the primary intention of creating another income stream for the football club. Fulham played two "home" games against Swinton and Huddersfield at Widnes in 1983 as the pitch at the Cottage had disintegrated in the wet winter following the collapse of the main drain to the River Thames under the Miller Stand.

The club also played several one-off games in 1983 at various football grounds around London; matches were played at Wealdstone's Lower Mead stadium, Hendon's Claremont Road ground, Brentford's Griffin Park and Chelsea's Stamford Bridge.

In 1982–83, a second immediate relegation in 1983–84, coupled with continuing financial losses, meant that the club moved to the Crystal Palace National Sports Centre for the 1984–85 season. After a single season, the club then moved to a new home at Chiswick Polytechnic Sports Ground in the summer of 1985, and would remain there for five years. The club returned to the Crystal Palace National Sports Centre in 1990, this time making it their home for three seasons.

Prior to the start of the 1991–92 season the club's name was officially changed from Fulham RLFC to London Crusaders RLFC. In June 1993 the club moved once again, from Crystal Palace National Sports Centre to Barnet Copthall arena.

In the spring of 1994 the Australian NRL club Brisbane Broncos bought the London Crusaders, renamed London Broncos from the start of the forthcoming 1994–95 season. The first home game under the new Broncos moniker was at Hendon F.C.'s ground at Claremont Road, though most home games were still played at Barnet Copthall.

For the 1995–96 season the club found another new home base, returning to south-west London at The Stoop Memorial Ground, home of Harlequins Rugby Union Club. The club moved once more prior to the start of the 1996 inaugural summer season of Super League, this time to south-east London to play at the Valley, home of Charlton Athletic. That season also brought the best London attendances since the first season at Craven Cottage. After only one season, they were on their way back to south-west London to play at the Stoop Memorial Ground again for the 1997 season. In 1998, as part of rugby league's "on the road" scheme London Broncos played Bradford Bulls at Tynecastle in Edinburgh in front of over 7,000 fans. The club returned to the Valley for the 2000 season.

York made an approach to the Virgin Group to buy the London Broncos in August 2001, with the aim of buying a Super League place for a proposed merged club to be based in York under a new name, York Wasps. This attempt was thrown out when Richard Branson rebuffed the offer as 'ridiculous, and speculative at best'. In 2002, fervent club supporter David Hughes purchased the majority shareholding from Virgin in a major restructuring of the club. The Broncos moved once again, to play their home matches at Griffin Park as tenants of Brentford FC.

The 2005 season was marked by significant activity off the pitch as the club welcomed new chairman and majority shareholder Ian Lenagan who had bought 65% of the shares. This was followed by the announcement of a partnership with Harlequins Rugby Union Club that saw the club return to The Stoop Memorial Ground, this time formally renamed as Harlequins RL and adopting the host club's kit and crest for the 2006 season.

At the time of the announcement there were many projected benefits of the clubs sharing and pooling; both clubs were to play at the same ground and have access to the training facilities at the Richardson Evans Playing Fields, Roehampton Vale, though as a home venue for the Harlequin Amateurs, this was not actually fit for a professional club of either code. The sole integration programme appeared to be a combined fund raising lottery – which folded long before the Rugby League club permanently left the Twickenham Stoop – and two "double header" match days. These were in 2006, in which the Union side played first, followed by the League side, but the two hour gap between fixtures was a deterrent to the Union supporters and the majority had left the ground before the kick-off of the League fixture. Whilst the club started with a goal of 5,500 average home ground attendance by mid 2007. the actual attendance average was around the 3,500 level.

The club announced on 1 November 2011 that it would be returning to the London Broncos name from the 2012 season. In addition, the team unveiled a new logo as well as new colours of black, light blue and silver. On 4 February, London Broncos played their first competitive match since reverting to that name in front of a 4,924 crowd, which was higher than all of their attendances in the year before.

In the 2012 season, the Broncos played two home games "on the road" away from the Twickenham Stoop, on 6 June at Leyton Orient FC's Brisbane Road in front of 2,844 fans, and on 20 June at Gillingham F.C.'s Priestfield Stadium, as recognition for the work Medway Dragons had done in growing rugby league in Kent. The game proved to be popular with an attendance of 3,930. In 2013, London Broncos used four venues for their home games with the majority being played at the Twickenham Stoop. On 8 June 2013, London once again played a home game at the Priestfield Stadium.

On 28 March, London had to play a home game at Esher RFC's ground at Molesey Road due to a waterlogged pitch at the Stoop. For the next home game on 6 April, Harlequins RU didn't allow London to use the Stoop due to a Heineken Cup game, forcing them to play Bradford at Adams Park in High Wycombe.

The club's financial struggles were made evident when, on 20 November 2013, the club announced that it would have to enter administration in ten working days if a new owner was not found. On 3 December 2013, London Broncos announced, "The club will be instructing lawyers to file a further notice of intention to appoint administrators at court, which shall be effective for 10 business days". The club's saviour David Hughes later decided to carry on putting millions into the club.

On 13 December 2013, London Broncos announced a move to the Hive Stadium in Canons Park, the new home of Barnet F.C., from the start of the 2014 season.

In 2016, London Broncos moved to Ealing having signed a three-year deal to play at the Trailfinders Sports Ground, home of rugby union side Ealing Trailfinders. With the entire 2020 Championship season cancelled due to the COVID-19 pandemic, the RFL advised the Broncos that their present ground at Ealing would be deemed as unsuitable for top level matches should they return to the Super League, so in December 2020 the club entered into discussions with AFC Wimbledon to groundshare at their newly built Plough Lane stadium in Wimbledon. The groundshare was approved mid-2021.

==== Gateshead Thunder (1999) → Hull F.C. ====
In 1999, the same year as the Sheffield Eagles relocation, Gateshead Thunder, who had only been playing in the Super League for one year, were taken over by Hull Sharks who then reverted to their traditional brand of Hull. The merged club played all its home games in Kingston upon Hull. As with Sheffield, a new Gateshead Thunder team was set up by supporters of the old side to play in the National Leagues, since renamed the Championship and League 1.

==== Gateshead Thunder (2000) → Newcastle Thunder ====
The second incarnation of Gateshead Thunder remained in that town until 2015, when they moved across the River Tyne to Newcastle, becoming the Newcastle Thunder. They currently play in League 1.

==== Mansfield Marksman → Nottingham City ====
Mansfield Marksman was founded in 1984. Mansfield was chosen as it was in the heartland of the Nottinghamshire coalfields, and close to Yorkshire where rugby league was much stronger. They played initially at Mansfield Town's Field Mill, and were sponsored by Mansfield Brewery and named "Marksman" in the singular after a lager the brewery produced.

The club colours were predominantly sky blue and dark blue shirts with yellow trim, however towards the end of their existence the club colours became a more basic blue and amber. The team was composed of northern, mainly West Yorkshire based players, who travelled down to play for Mansfield.

The club lost £90,000 in this first year and could not afford the rent at Field Mill. The final game there was on 2 February 1986. The club then moved to Alfreton Town's North Street ground in Alfreton. The first game at the new venue was on 23 March 1986.

The club moved once again for the 1988–89 season to Sutton Town's Lowmoor Road ground at Kirkby-in-Ashfield.

A boardroom split occurred over the decision to move the club to Nottingham in June 1989. The move also led to the loss of sponsorship by Mansfield Brewery and the club was renamed Nottingham City RLFC. They played at the Harvey Hadden Stadium and their initial club colours were sky blue shirts with a dark blue and gold vee, carrying over the Mansfield Marksman colours. Later the club colours changed to myrtle green, yellow and white shirts. In later years the shirts were myrtle green with purple trim. One season the team adopted the name Nottingham City Outlaws RLFC, a name that would later be used by the city's amateur side, the Nottingham Outlaws.

The Nottingham team was led by player-coach Mark Burgess, several players were from Batley Boys RLFC and other local towns, Dave Parker took over as Managing Director at Huddersfield and the Nottingham City club was run by former Mansfield Director Paul Tomlinson and his mother Joan. As Nottingham they won only seven games in four years.

Chief Executive Maurice Lindsay wanted to reduce the number of clubs in the lower division of the league in 1993. The three clubs finishing bottom of the second division would be demoted to the National Conference League. Nottingham struggled and finished bottom of the Third Division at the end of the 1992–93 season, winning only one game. With both Nottingham City and Blackpool Gladiators both already relegated, the crucial last match at Nottingham on 12 April 1993, between Nottingham City and Highfield would determine the final relegation spot. Highfield won 39–6 and Highfield survived at the expense of Chorley Borough.

The RLSA, the Rugby League Supporters Association, had called on fans to turn out at the Harvey Hadden Stadium, in protest against the decision, City's normal crowd of three hundred or so was boosted by this to a season's best of 851. The three expelled clubs plus Highfield RLFC pursued legal action against the Rugby Football League decision, but to no avail.

Nottingham could no longer afford Yorkshire-based players so imported local Nottingham Crusaders players who were not of National Conference League standards and they were relegated in their first year and then resigned from the league the following year.

==== Sheffield Eagles → Huddersfield-Sheffield Giants ====
In 1999, just one year after the Sheffield Eagles won the Challenge Cup, they accepted an offer from the RFL to merge with the Huddersfield Giants. The new team, Huddersfield-Sheffield Giants, played some matches in Sheffield's Don Valley Stadium and some in Huddersfield's McAlpine Stadium. However, the new team consisting of mostly ex-Sheffield players, whilst retaining the old -Giants suffix resulted in a lack of acceptance from both sets of fans (though primarily Sheffield), and the team reverted to the Huddersfield Giants name the following season, effectively a franchise of the team. A new Sheffield Eagles started from scratch that following season, and now compete in the second-tier Championship.

==== Swinton Lions ====
The Swinton Lions, known as Swinton R.L.F.C. until 1996, have relocated several times around the Greater Manchester area. Apart from very early relocations within Swinton in the late 19th and early 20th centuries, the relocations began especially since their traditional home of Station Road was demolished in 1992, a venue they have been playing at since 1929. It was widely regarded as one of the largest and best rugby league venues, with a capacity of 60,000 and a record attendance of 44,621 in a Challenge Cup Semi Final on 7 April 1951 between Warrington and Wigan. Fire damaged the disused Main Stand including offices and function rooms in July 1992, this was the last in a series of vandalism before the club moved out of Station Road. Station Road was sold at the end of the 1991–92 season by the club's directors to David McLean Homes for property development, part of the deal involved sponsoring the Lions in their first season post Station Road. The last match to be played at Station Road was a local derby versus Salford on 20 April 1992 with 3,487 witnessing Salford winning 26-18 and Ian Pickavance of Swinton scoring the last try. The site is now a housing estate.

Since 1992 the club has relocated to the following grounds: in 1992 they relocated to Gigg Lane, home of Bury F.C. in Bury where they played till 2002, followed by a season at Moor Lane, home of Salford City F.C. in Salford. The next few years since 2004 was at Park Lane, in Whitefield where they played until 2010, returning later for one year only in 2015. In between that time they played one year at home of Salford Red Devils at The Willows, Salford and Leigh Sports Village in Leigh between 2012 and 2014.

Since 2016 they have played at the former home of Sale Sharks, Heywood Road, Sale, vacated by their move to Edgeley Park in Stockport. The move of Swinton to the ground meant that the General Safety Certificate had to be renewed. In September 2016 a report by Trafford Council to the Safety at Sports Grounds Sub-Committee recommended that Heywood Road's capacity be reduced from 5,400 down to 3,387 for safety reasons.

==== Weaverham Rangers → Winnington Park → Northwich Stags ====
Weaverham Rangers became Winnington Park and joined the Rugby League Conference in 2006. Winnington Park had previously hosted a rugby league in the past when Crewe Wolves temporarily played there. Winnington Park moved to neighbours Northwich RUFC and became Northwich Stags in 2008, the team won the Cheshire Division of the Conference but after 2009 in the Rugby League Merit League the club folded.

==== Wigan Highfield → London Highfield → Liverpool Stanley → Liverpool City → Huyton RLFC → Runcorn Highfield → Highfield RLFC → Prescot Panthers ====
Wigan Highfield was formed around 1880 and went out of existence for a few years following the rugby schism of 1895. They reformed in 1902, playing in a league comprising the "A" teams of the major clubs. Despite the "Highfield" tag, Wigan Highfield played in Pemberton, down the road from the Highfield area of Wigan. In 1921–22, the club made an application for full Rugby League status, but it was decided that their Tunstall Lane ground was not big enough. By incorporating a field, it was possible to increase the size of the ground and in the 1922–23 season the club entered the Rugby League as Wigan Highfield.

In 1932, Leeds played Wigan in an exhibition match at the White City Stadium in west London under floodlights. The owner of the stadium, Brigadier-General A C Critchley, was impressed enough to take over Wigan Highfield, who had finished second from bottom in the league, and agreed to pay off their debts. He moved the club to White City and renamed the club London Highfield. The club's old Tunstall Lane ground was sold off for housing. Despite reasonable success, the White City Company deemed the venture unprofitable and decided not to continue with rugby league beyond the first season. Players' match fees and expenses, plus compensating other team's travel costs contributed largely to the club's loss that year of £8,000.

In 1934, Highfield returned north to the Stanley greyhound stadium in Liverpool and became Liverpool Stanley. For the start of the 1950–51 season the club moved to Mill Yard, Knotty Ash and was renamed Liverpool City RLFC (not to be confused with a previous club of the same name).

In July 1964, the club's board were informed that the Knotty Ash lease would not be renewed and negotiations then took place with nearby Huyton local authority for a 21-year lease at the new Alt Park Ground, becoming Huyton RLFC. With Alt Park not ready, Huyton spent their first year of existence as homeless nomads. Most home matches were played at Widnes. Alt Park was eventually ready in August 1969. It was of a poor standard and often suffered from vandalism.

The club continued as Huyton RLFC and struggled in the second division until 1985, when the club moved to Runcorn F.C.'s Canal Street Ground, Runcorn after Alt Park's main stand was declared unsafe. The club then became known as Runcorn Highfield RLFC. Around the time of Huyton RLFC's proposed move to Runcorn, the then tenants of the Canal Street ground, Runcorn F.C., and its board of directors had mooted the idea of gaining extra income by establishing a rugby league club. That year saw applications from new clubs Mansfield Marksman and Sheffield Eagles. When these clubs were elected into the Rugby Football League, Runcorn F.C. withdrew its application and decided to allow Huyton RLFC to move to their ground instead.

When Runcorn Football Club increased the rent for Canal Street, Runcorn Highfield signed a 99-year agreement with St Helens Town F.C. in August 1990 and moved to Hoghton Road, Sutton. The move was opposed by St. Helens and the Rugby League Board but approved by the full Rugby League Council by 26 votes to 6 on 5 October 1990. The club was renamed Highfield RLFC for the 1991–92 season.

Highfield moved to Valerie Park in Prescot during the 1994–95 season, a move that was made due to the tenants of Hoghton Road, St Helens Town A.F.C. deciding to increase the rent on the ground. Highfield RLFC played there until the start of the 1996 season, when they were then renamed Prescot Panthers to coincide with the start of the Super League.

A brewery loan, which had kept the club afloat both at Sutton (Highfield) and later on at Prescot, changed hands and the new creditors wanted the loan to be repaid immediately. With this loan, Geoff Fletcher had managed to sustain a social club at Valerie Park which provided the club with a small but sufficient income. When the brewery loan was recalled, the Prescot Panthers went into administration and then ultimately receivership. Chairman Geoff Fletcher accepted a one-off payment of about £30,000 for the club to resign from the Rugby Football League. Equitable payments were then made from the £30,000 to the club's bankers and also to the few remaining Huyton-with-Roby RLFC Ltd Co. shareholders.

=== Wales ===
==== Cardiff City Blue Dragons → Bridgend Blue Dragons ====
Cardiff City Blue Dragons were a rugby league team formed in 1981. Their home ground was Ninian Park which was also used by Cardiff City F.C. The club spent three seasons in Cardiff before relocating to Bridgend. In July 1984 the club was bought out of liquidation by a consortium. The new owners came under pressure from the Welsh FA who wanted Ninian Park as their permanent headquarters and were opposed to ground sharing with rugby league. As a result, the Blue Dragons changed their name to Bridgend Blue Dragons and relocated the club to Bridgend Town A.F.C.'s Coychurch Road ground. They were wound up in 1986 as they failed to secure a ground for the forthcoming season.

==== Celtic Crusaders → Crusaders Rugby League ====
Following their inaugural Super League season in 2009, the Celtic Crusaders, based in the South Wales town of Bridgend since their formation in 2005, moved to the North Wales town of Wrexham and renamed themselves Crusaders Rugby League. The team folded after the 2011 season and was replaced by the North Wales Crusaders, competing in League 1.

==== Valley Cougars ====
Founded in 2001 as Cynon Valley Cougars, after their debut season in the Welsh Division in 2003 they dropped "Cynon" from their name. They led a nomadic existence for their first few years in the valleys playing out of places like Pontyclun, Abercynon and Sardis Road, Pontypridd, Nelson and Treharris. They currently share facilities with Treharris RFC in Merthyr.

==== South Wales Scorpions → South Wales Ironmen → West Wales Raiders ====
Founded in 2009 as South Wales Scorpions, they initially played home games in Neath. The club then led a nomadic existence for the 2014–2016 seasons, variously playing in Maesteg, Mountain Ash, and Caerphilly. For 2017, they moved to Merthyr Tydfil, renaming themselves South Wales Ironmen. Following that season, they were purchased by the chairman of the Llanelli-based Conference League South side West Wales Raiders and moved to that town; the former Ironmen will take up the West Wales Raiders name for 2018 and beyond.

== Rugby union ==
A number of rugby union clubs have made minor relocations from time to time, almost always within their current conurbation.

=== Relocations out of London ===
Five clubs with historic roots in London either currently play in the Premiership or have played in that league in the recent past. Two of these clubs now play their home matches outside Greater London, with one playing within the London commuter belt and one playing outside it. A third club returned its home matches to Greater London for 2015–16 after three seasons playing outside the commuter belt.

==== London Irish ====
London Irish were founded in London in 1898 for the city's Irish community. The club established their first home ground at The Avenue in Sunbury, Middlesex in 1931. In 1965, most of Middlesex was incorporated into Greater London, but Sunbury was instead attached to Surrey. In 2000, London Irish moved their senior team to Madejski Stadium in Reading (groundsharing with Reading F.C.), though their headquarters remained in Sunbury. They moved back to London in 2021 and played out of the Brentford Community Stadium with Brentford F.C., before being dissolved in 2023.

==== London Wasps → Wasps RFC ====
London Wasps were founded in 1867 in North London via a membership split of Hampstead Football Club, which had been created a year earlier. They established their first permanent ground at Repton Avenue in Sudbury in 1923. In 1996, they moved within Greater London to groundshare with Queens Park Rangers at Loftus Road, and eventually added "London" to their name in 1999. They moved outside Greater London in 2002 to share Adams Park in High Wycombe with Wycombe Wanderers. Wasps later moved their headquarters to Adams Park, and dropped "London" from their official name in 2014. In October 2014, The Telegraph reported that Wasps were nearing completion of the purchase of a 50% interest in Ricoh Arena in Coventry, also home to Coventry City F.C., and would move their home games there in 2015–16. Wasps intend to keep their training base at Acton Park in West London, where it has remained throughout their recent moves. Coventry Council unanimously approved the purchase on 7 October, and the move also received the approval of the Rugby Football Union and Premiership Rugby. The following day, Wasps announced that their first home match at Ricoh Arena would occur that December. Prior to Wasps' first match in Coventry, the club purchased the remaining 50% interest in the stadium. The move helped to remove any chance of the local football club, Coventry City F.C., of purchasing any percentage in buying the Ricoh Arena. The football club negotiated a 2-year lease, which runs out at the end of the 2017/18 season, in which would leave the club homeless.

==== London Welsh ====
London Welsh were most recently promoted from the RFU Championship at the end of the 2013–14 season. London Welsh were founded in 1885 for the city's Welsh community, and eventually settled in at Old Deer Park in Richmond. However, from the 2012–13 season through to 2014–15, they groundshared with Oxford United at Kassam Stadium, well outside the commuter belt. They still maintained their training base at Old Deer Park.

The Oxford relocation proved to be temporary. Following their relegation at the end of a 2014–15 season in which they failed to win a game, London Welsh announced that they would return home games to Old Deer Park for the immediate future whilst seeking another stadium option. The club went into administration in December 2016 and were expelled from the RFU Championship the following month.

=== Relocations within London ===
Two current Premiership clubs with London roots play in Greater London. One has remained in London throughout its history; the other returned to London in February 2013 after more than a decade in Watford.

==== Harlequins ====
Harlequins, the second part of the Hampstead F.C. split, played at a number of grounds in London until the RFU invited them to play at Twickenham in 1906. The club acquired an athletics ground across the road from Twickenham in 1963, built today's Twickenham Stoop on the site, and have played there ever since. Quins have long been headquartered at Twickenham—first at the RFU stadium, and now at The Stoop.

==== Saracens ====
Saracens were founded in 1876 in Marylebone, and moved numerous times within what is now Greater London. At the dawn of the professional era in 1995, they moved again within Greater London to Enfield, and then moved outside the boundary in 1997 to groundshare with Watford F.C. at Vicarage Road. Saracens initially planned to return home matches to Greater London at the Barnet Copthall complex in 2012, but delays meant that the move was put off until February 2013. The club currently maintain their headquarters outside Greater London in St Albans.

=== Other Relocations ===
==== Burnage Rugby ====
Burnage Rugby moved from Burnage in South Manchester to a new site at Heaton Mersey in Stockport in the 1970s.

==== Sale Sharks ====
Another Premiership club, Sale Sharks, have moved their home ground from their original base, though within the same conurbation. Founded in Sale in 1861, they settled at Heywood Road in Sale in 1905, and played there for nearly a century. In 2003, they began a groundshare in Stockport with Stockport County F.C. at Edgeley Park, and eventually moved their headquarters there. After the 2011–12 season, they moved their home ground again within Greater Manchester, sharing the venue now known as AJ Bell Stadium with the Salford Red Devils (then Salford City Reds) rugby league side.

==== Serpentine F.C. → Waterloo F.C. ====
Waterloo Football Club, founded in 1882, was until 1884 was known as Serpentine F.C. after the road near its original ground. In 1884 a dispute prompted a relocation to Waterloo and so the club's name was changed. The club returned to the Blundellsands area in 1892 and has remained there ever since.
