= 1978–79 Northern League (ice hockey) season =

Ice hockey season for UK league

1978-79 Northern League season

The 1978-79 Northern League season was the 13th season of the Northern League, the top level ice hockey league in northern England and Scotland. Seven teams participated in the league, and the Murrayfield Racers won the championship. The top four teams qualified for the Spring Cup, which served as the Northern League playoffs.

== Regular season ==
| | Club | GP | W | T | L | GF–GA | Pts |
|---|---|---|---|---|---|---|---|
| 1. | Murrayfield Racers | 12 | 11 | 1 | 0 | 104:34 | 23 |
| 2. | Fife Flyers | 12 | 10 | 0 | 2 | 89:56 | 20 |
| 3. | Whitley Warriors | 12 | 6 | 1 | 5 | 85:65 | 13 |
| 4. | Billingham Bombers | 12 | 5 | 1 | 6 | 79:76 | 11 |
| 5. | Glasgow Dynamos | 12 | 5 | 1 | 6 | 52:82 | 11 |
| 6. | Ayr Bruins | 12 | 1 | 1 | 10 | 49:104 | 3 |
| 7. | Durham Wasps | 12 | 1 | 1 | 10 | 36:77 | 3 |

== Spring Cup ==
=== Semifinals ===
- Whitley Warriors - Murrayfield Racers 2:0, 5:8
- Billingham Bombers - Fife Flyers 9:6, 6:14

=== Final ===
- Fife Flyers - Murrayfield Racers 1:2, 5:5
