= 1966–67 British Ice Hockey season =

- Sport: ice hockey

Seasons
- ← 1965–66 1967–68 →

The 1966–67 British Ice Hockey season featured a new Scottish League which was later renamed the Northern League for teams from Scotland, Durham and Whitley Bay. Glasgow Dynamos won the Icy Smith Cup.

== Scottish League ==
=== Regular season ===
	Club	GP	W	T	L	GF–GA	Pts
1.	Paisley Mohawks	32	27	1	4	188:54	55
2.	Murrayfield Racers	32	25	1	6	189:85	51
3.	Glasgow Dynamos	30	19	1	10	161:106	43
4.	Durham Wasps	30	16	3	11	142:111	35
5.	Whitley Warriors	30	15	3	12	127:111	33
6.	Fife Flyers	30	14	2	14	127:126	30
7.	Ayr Bruins	32	6	3	23	66:180	15
8.	Perth Blackhawks *	26	2	2	22	32:113	6
9.	Paisley Vikings *	22	0	0	22	5:151	0

(* Perth and Paisley played all their games for 4 points each.)

== Icy Smith Cup Final ==
Glasgow Dynamos defeated Murrayfield Racers by a score of 12-10 in the Icy Smith Cup Final, which was a tournament that was the forerunner of the British Championship playoffs.
