= Ronnie Wood (ice hockey) =

Scottish ice hockey player

- Born: 13 November 1960 (age 65) Scotland, GBR
- Position: Forward
- Played for: Murrayfield Racers; Dundee Rockets; Fife Flyers; Tayside Tigers; Solihull Barons; Ayr Bruins; Sheffield Steelers
- Playing career: 1980–1993

Ronnie Wood (born 13 November 1960) is a retired Scottish professional ice hockey player who played between 1980 and 1993 in the United Kingdom. He is credited, with David Gardner-Brown, for creating the Sheffield Steelers in 1991, for whom he was also the General Manager between 1991 and February 1993.

== Playing career ==
After making his senior level debut in the 1980–81 season for the Murrayfield Racers, who he helped to win the Northern League, Wood joined the Dundee Rockets for the 1981–82 season. He played for Dundee for the next six season, helping them to win the Northern League and the Scottish National League in 1981–82, the Autumn Cup in 1983, the British Hockey League in 1982–83 and 1983–84 and the playoffs in 1982, 1983 and 1984.

Wood joined the Fife Flyers for the 1987–88 and 1988–89 seasons before he joined the Tayside Tigers for the end of the 1988–89 season. He then joined the Solihull Barons for the start of the 1989–90 season, which he finished with the Ayr Bruins before returning to Solihull for the 1990–91 season.

After Solihull folded in 1991, he helped form the Sheffield Steelers with David Gardner-Brown and played for them for the next two seasons, helping them gain promotion from English League Division 1 to the British League Division 1 and then the Premier Division. In 1998 Wood moved to South Africa where he coaches at club, Provincial and National Team level. He has coached South African Senior National men's team To Silver in I.I.H.F.World s Div 3 and is currently coaching in Cape Town.

== Honours and awards ==
- Named to the Northern League All Star B Team in 1981.
- Named to the BHL All Star Second Team in 1983 and 1984.
- Named to the BHL Premier Division British Players All Star Team in 1987.
- Number 7 jersey retired by Sheffield Steelers.

== Records ==
- Most goals (58) and points (91) for the Murrayfield Racers in 1980–81.

== Career statistics ==
			Regular season					Playoffs				
Season	Team	League	GP	G	A	Pts	PIM	GP	G	A	Pts	PIM
1980–81	Murrayfield Racers	Northern (UK)	33	58	33	91	48					
1981–82	Dundee Rockets	Northern (UK)	14	29	26	55	20					
1981–82	Dundee Rockets	SNL	8	20	24	44	10					
1982–83	Dundee Rockets	BHL						3	4	2	6	2
1983–84	Dundee Rockets	BHL	31	62	57	119	34	6	8	5	13	8
1984–85	Dundee Rockets	BHL	33	56	47	103	50					
1985–86	Dundee Rockets	BHL	36	33	41	74	36	6	5	3	8	18
1986–87	Dundee Rockets	BHL	36	64	60	124	47	5	4	9	13	2
1987–88	Fife Flyers	BHL	32	17	25	42	8	6	6	6	12	4
1988–89	Fife Flyers	BHL	20	23	28	51	20					
1988–89	Tayside Tigers	BHL	14	15	16	31	12					
1989–90	Solihull Barons	BHL	27	18	18	36	16					
1989–90	Ayr Bruins	BHL	6	1	3	4	0					
1990–91	Solihull Barons	BHL	34	28	29	57	16					
1991–92	Sheffield Steelers	BHL	32	43	50	93	28	6	5	4	9	2
1992–93	Sheffield Steelers	BHL	27	3	9	12	2	6	5	2	7	0
Totals			383	470	466	936	347	38	37	31	68	36
