= 1968–69 British Ice Hockey season =

- Sport: ice hockey

Seasons
- ← 1967–68 1969–70 →

The 1968–69 British Ice Hockey season featured the Northern League for teams from Scotland and the north of England. Murrayfield Racers won the Icy Smith Cup and the Autumn Cup.

== Northern League ==
=== Regular season ===
	Club	GP	W	T	L	GF–GA	Pts
1.	Paisley Mohawks	10	9	1	0	70:31	19
2.	Murrayfield Racers	10	8	0	2	65:36	16
3.	Whitley Warriors	10	4	2	4	65:53	10
4.	Glasgow Dynamos	10	3	0	7	54:64	6
5.	Durham Wasps	10	3	0	7	48:78	6
6.	Fife Flyers	10	1	1	8	35:75	3

== Spring Cup ==
=== Final ===
Murrayfield Racers defeated the Paisley Mohawks

== Icy Smith Cup Final ==
Murrayfield Racers defeated Glasgow Dynamos by an aggregate score of 9-5 in the Icy Smith Cup Final, which was a tournament that was the forerunner of the British Championship playoffs. Murrayfield won the first leg 7-2, Glasgow won the second leg 3-2.

== Autumn Cup ==
=== Results ===
	Club	GP	W	L	T	GF	GA	Pts
1.	Murrayfield Racers	10	8	1	1	81	35	17
2.	Paisley Mohawks	10	8	2	0	74	39	16
3.	Whitley Warriors	10	4	4	2	72	75	10
4.	Glasgow Dynamos	10	3	5	2	46	56	8
5.	Durham Wasps	10	1	6	3	41	77	5
6.	Fife Flyers	10	1	7	2	48	80	4
