= Tim Cranston =

Canadian ice hockey player

- Born: 13 December 1962 (age 63) Halifax, Nova Scotia, Canada
- Height: 5 ft 8 in (173 cm)
- Weight: 194 lb (88 kg; 13 st 12 lb)
- Position: Forward
- Played for: GIJS Groningen; VEU Feldkirch; Genève-Servette HC; EHC Basel; EV Füssen; Nova Scotia Oilers; SC Herisau; EV Duisburg; Fife Flyers; Cleveland Bombers; Durham Wasps; Sheffield Steelers; Edinburgh Capitals
- National team: Great Britain
- Playing career: 1985–1999

Tim Cranston (born 13 December 1962) is a retired professional ice hockey player who holds dual Canadian and British nationality. He played in Europe between 1985 and 1999 except for one game in the 1986–87 season played in the American Hockey League. He was also a member of the Great Britain national ice hockey team between 1993 and 1997. Whilst living in the United Kingdom, Cranston was the founding chairman of the British Ice Hockey Player's Association (GB). Currently living in Halifax, Nova Scotia, Cranston is working as a sports agent and lawyer for the sports and entertainment industries. He was inducted into the British Ice Hockey Hall of Fame in 2010.

== Playing career ==
After playing junior ice hockey, Cranston moved to Europe to play for GIJS Groningen in the 1984–85 season of the Dutch Eredivisie. He then split the 1985–86 season between VEU Feldkirch in the Austrian Hockey League and Genève-Servette HC in the Swiss Nationalliga B. During the 1986–87 season, he again played in the Nationalliga B, but this time with EHC Basel, as well as playing for EV Füssen in the German 1.Liga Süd before he finished the season playing one game for Nova Scotia Oilers in the American Hockey League.

Cranston returned to Europe and the Swiss Nationalliga B for the 1987–88 season to play for SC Herisau. He again split the 1988–89 season when he played for EV Duisburg in the German 1.Liga Nord and the Fife Flyers in the Premier Division of the British Hockey League (BHL). Remaining in the United Kingdom, Cranston then joined the Cleveland Bombers in Division 1 of the BHL for the 1989–90 season. A successful season saw Cranston named to the All Star team and promotion for Cleveland to the Premier Division. Cranston again played for Cleveland during the 1990–91 season before he moved to the Durham Wasps for the 1991–92 and 1992–93 seasons. During the 1991–92 season with Durham, he helped them to win the league championship and the playoffs.

Joining the Sheffield Steelers for the 1993–94 season, Cranston remained in Sheffield for the next five seasons. A successful period for both Cranston and Sheffield, he helped them to win the league championship and the playoffs in the 1994–95 season, a Grand Slam of the Benson & Hedges Cup, the league championship and the playoffs in the 1995–96 season, and the playoffs in the inaugural season of the Ice Hockey Superleague, 1996–97.

Cranston played his final season with the Edinburgh Capitals in the British National League during the 1998–99 season.

== Off ice career ==
Cranston completed his degree in Law at Durham University in 1993. As a student, he combined his studies with training three times a week at Durham Wasps, and also founded a student law journal, Inter Alia. He was admitted to the Bar of England and Wales in 1996 and the Bar of Nova Scotia in 2001.

With ice hockey in the United Kingdom becoming more popular in the late 1980s and the influx of player's, Cranston, with Joanne Collins, formed the Ice Hockey Player's Association (GB) in 1994. He was the founding chairman and has remained the Association's legal adviser.

During his time at Sheffield, Cranston married his English girlfriend, Anna, He also opened a sports bar, The Player's Cafe, with Sheffield rock band, Def Leppard, members Joe Elliott and Rick Savage.

Returning to North America in 1999 when he retired from playing, Cranston became a sports agent and formed his own company, Cranston Sports Management, with whom he has represented or trained such players as Sidney Crosby and Marek Svatos. He has also continued to work as a lawyer in the sports and entertainment industries.

Cranston was a candidate in the 2021 Nova Scotia general election in the Halifax Atlantic riding for the Progressive Conservative Party of Nova Scotia. He was not elected.

== Honours and awards ==
- Named to the BHL Division 1 All Star Team in 1990.
- Awarded testimonial by Sheffield Steelers on 4 November 1998.
- Number 4 jersey retired by Sheffield Steelers.
- Inducted to the Sheffield Steelers Hall of Fame in 2005.
- Inducted to the British Ice Hockey Hall of Fame in 2010.

== Records ==
- Most assists (67) and points (113) for Sherbrooke Beavers in 1980–81.
- Most points (133) in the Dutch Eredivisie in 1984–85.
- Most penalty minutes (78) for the Cleveland Bombers in 1989–90.
- Most goals (71), assists (47) and points (118) for the Cleveland Bombers in 1990–91.
- Most goals (69) and points (132) for the Sheffield Steelers in 1993–94.
- Most penalty minutes (126) for Sheffield Steelers in 1994–95.

== Career statistics ==
| | | | Regular season | | | | | Playoffs | | | | |
| Season | Team | League | GP | G | A | Pts | PIM | GP | G | A | Pts | PIM |
|---|---|---|---|---|---|---|---|---|---|---|---|---|
| 1979–80 | Sherbrooke Beavers | QMJHL | 65 | 14 | 14 | 28 | 35 | | | | | |
| 1980–81 | Sherbrooke Beavers | QMJHL | 72 | 46 | 67 | 113 | 123 | | | | | |
| 1981–82 | Hull Olympiques | QMJHL | 55 | 30 | 50 | 80 | 117 | 14 | 4 | 14 | 18 | 18 |
| 1984–85 | GIJS Groningen | Eredivisie | 42 | 58 | 75 | 133 | | | | | | |
| 1985–86 | VEU Feldkirch | Austrian | 4 | 2 | 2 | 4 | 21 | | | | | |
| 1985–86 | Genève-Servette HC | Nationalliga B | | | | | | | | | | |
| 1986–87 | EHC Basel | Nationalliga B | | | | | | | | | | |
| 1986–87 | EV Füssen | 1.Liga Süd | 15 | 12 | 22 | 34 | 16 | 11 | 4 | 7 | 11 | 22 |
| 1986–87 | Nova Scotia Oilers | AHL | 1 | 0 | 0 | 0 | 2 | — | — | — | — | — |
| 1987–88 | SC Herisau | Nationalliga B | | | | | | | | | | |
| 1988–89 | EV Duisburg | 1.Liga Nord | | | | | | | | | | |
| 1988–89 | Fife Flyers | BHL Premier | 7 | 19 | 16 | 35 | 14 | | | | | |
| 1989–90 | Cleveland Bombers | BHL Div 1 | 32 | 91 | 72 | 163 | 78 | | | | | |
| 1990–91 | Cleveland Bombers | BHL Premier | 36 | 71 | 47 | 118 | 102 | | | | | |
| 1991–92 | Durham Wasps | BHL Premier | 31 | 41 | 25 | 66 | 122 | 8 | 9 | 5 | 14 | 30 |
| 1992–93 | Durham Wasps | BHL Premier | 7 | 6 | 4 | 10 | 12 | | | | | |
| 1993–94 | Sheffield Steelers | BHL Premier | 44 | 52 | 49 | 101 | 86 | 8 | 12 | 5 | 17 | 22 |
| 1994–95 | Sheffield Steelers | BHL Premier | 42 | 41 | 44 | 85 | 126 | 8 | 8 | 5 | 13 | 14 |
| 1995–96 | Sheffield Steelers | BHL Premier | 36 | 33 | 22 | 55 | 115 | 8 | 6 | 3 | 9 | 12 |
| 1996–97 | Sheffield Steelers | ISL | 42 | 11 | 22 | 33 | 56 | 8 | 0 | 1 | 1 | 6 |
| 1997–98 | Sheffield Steelers | ISL | 42 | 14 | 11 | 25 | 32 | 9 | 2 | 2 | 4 | 12 |
| 1998–99 | Edinburgh Capitals | BNL | 13 | 9 | 8 | 17 | 35 | 4 | 1 | 1 | 2 | 6 |

== International play ==
Played for the Great Britain national ice hockey team in:

- 1993 Pool B World Championships
- 1993 Olympic Qualifying Tournament
- 1994 World Championships
- 1995 Olympic Qualifying Tournament
- 1996 Pool B World Championships
- 1996 Olympic Qualifying Tournament
- 1997 Pool B World Championships

=== International statistics ===
| Year | Team | Comp | GP | G | A | Pts | PIM |
|---|---|---|---|---|---|---|---|
| 1993 | Great Britain | WC(B) | 7 | 3 | 1 | 4 | 41 |
| 1993 | Great Britain | Oly–Q | 4 | 1 | 1 | 2 | 8 |
| 1994 | Great Britain | WC | 6 | 0 | 0 | 0 | 4 |
| 1995 | Great Britain | Oly–Q | 3 | 0 | 2 | 2 | 6 |
| 1996 | Great Britain | WC(B) | 7 | 4 | 4 | 8 | 14 |
| 1996 | Great Britain | Oly–Q | 5 | 2 | 2 | 4 | 10 |
| 1997 | Great Britain | WC(B) | 7 | 1 | 3 | 4 | 8 |
| Totals | | | 39 | 11 | 13 | 24 | 91 |
