= Roy Halpin =

Canadian ice hockey player (born 1955)

- Born: 18 October 1955 (age 71) Quebec City, Quebec, Canada
- Position: Forward
- Played for: Snow Brand Sapporo; Dundee Rockets
- Playing career: 1980–1985

Roy Andrew Halpin (born 18 October 1955) is a Canadian retired professional ice hockey forward who played mostly in the United Kingdom. He was inducted into the British Ice Hockey Hall of Fame in 1986. Halpin is currently the executive director of the Uniprix Stadium in Montreal.

== Career ==
Halpin was born in Quebec City, Quebec. Learning to play ice hockey in Quebec, Halpin went on to play major junior ice hockey with the Quebec Remparts in the Quebec Major Junior Hockey League. After junior ice hockey, and between 1975 and 1980, Halpin attended and played for the ice hockey teams at the University of Moncton, the University of Toronto and Concordia University at the same time. Although offered a contract by the Toronto Maple Leafs in 1979, Halpin chose to continue his studies of Sports Administration at Concordia.

In 1980, Halpin played in an ice hockey tournament in Dundee with the Concordia Stingers. After leaving university, he played in Japan for Snow Brand Sapporo during the 1980–81 season. Halpin returned to Dundee to play for the Dundee Rockets at the start of the 1981–82 season. During the next three seasons with the Rocket, Halpin helped them to win the Northern League in 1981–82; the British Premier Division in 1982–83 and 1983–84; the playoffs in 1982, 1983 and 1984; and the Autumn Cup in 1983. Halpin, himself, was named to the three All-star teams during that time.

Halpin was forced to retire the following season, 1984–85, due to a persistent back injury. Scoring a point in his final game on 12 January 1985 in Nottingham meant that Halpin had scored at least 100 points in the four seasons he played for the Rockets. In his four seasons in the UK, he scored an impressive 343 goals and 293 assists for 636 points in 122 games.

After setting up a junior ice hockey tournament, Halpin returned to Canada. Using his degree in Sports Administration, he became a full-time tournament co-ordinator, went on to become the director for the Canada Masters tennis tournament and is currently the executive director of the Uniprix Stadium in Montreal.

== Awards and honours ==
- Northern League All-star A Team in 1982.
- British Hockey League All-star First Team in 1983 and 1984.
- Inducted to the British Ice Hockey Hall of Fame in 1986.

== Records ==
- Most goals in the 1983–84 season of the British Premier Division.
- Most points in the 1983–84 season of the British Premier Division.

== Career statistics ==
			Regular season					Playoffs				
Season	Team	League	GP	G	A	Pts	PIM	GP	G	A	Pts	PIM
1980–81	Snow Brand Sapporo	Japan	Statistics unavailable									
1981–82	Dundee Rockets	Northern	14	53	32	85	28					
1981–82	Dundee Rockets	SNL	8	26	22	48	25					
1982–83	Dundee Rockets	BHL 1	26	73	81	154	50	3	5	3	8	10
1983–84	Dundee Rockets	BHL Prem	30	94	81	175	16	6	9	9	18	10
1984–85	Dundee Rockets	BHL Prem	14	26	27	53	8					
