= 1965–66 British Ice Hockey season =

- Sport: ice hockey

Seasons
- ← 1964–65 1966–67 →

The 1965–66 British Ice Hockey season featured the Coca-Cola Championship, consisting of separate leagues comprising English and Scottish teams.

This competition involved Fife Flyers, Murrayfield Royals, Paisley Mohawks, Ayr Rangers, Wembley Lions, Brighton Tigers and Durham Wasps in rink competitions. The fixtures in Section B were unfinished and although the league part of the competition was incomplete, a final tie for the trophy was arranged:

Fife Flyers beat Paisley Mohawks 9-6 on aggregate (5-2, 4-4)

Oxford University defeated Cambridge University 16-2 at the Richmond Ice Rink in the varsity match.

Murrayfield Racers defeated the Durham Hornets by a score of 11-8 in the Icy Smith Cup final, a tournament that was the forerunner of the British Championship play-offs.
