= 1962–63 British Ice Hockey season =

- Sport: ice hockey

Seasons
- ← 1961–62 1963–64 →

The 1962–63 British Ice Hockey season saw a return for the Scottish League but there was still no league structure in England for the third consecutive year. Durham Wasps competed in the Scottish League.

== Varsity Match ==
- Cambridge University defeated Oxford University 6-4 in the Ice Hockey Varsity Match at the Richmond Ice Rink.

== Scottish League ==
=== Regular season ===
Eight teams participated in the league, it utilised an inter-linked schedule, as three of the eight teams did not have a home rink. Ayr Rangers were declared Champions.

==== Group A ====
	Club	GP	W	T	L	GF–GA	Pts
1.	Ayr Rangers	9	7	0	2	55:25	14
2.	Fife Flyers	10	5	1	4	53:48	11
3.	Murrayfield Royals	11	5	0	6	50:42	10

==== Group B ====
	Club	GP	W	T	L	GF–GA	Pts
1.	Paisley Mohawks	5	4	1	0	29:12	9
2.	Durham Wasps	2	1	0	1	8:9	2
3.	Perth Black Hawks	5	1	0	4	24:36	2
4.	Glasgow Flyers	4	0	0	4	6:31	0
5.	Vikings	2	0	0	2	2:24	0

Note: These standings are the last known ones for the year, dated February 8, 1963.
