= 1964–65 British Ice Hockey season =

- Sport: ice hockey

Seasons
- ← 1963–64 1965–66 →

The 1964–65 British Ice Hockey season featured a Scottish League but there was no league structure in England for the fifth consecutive year. Durham Wasps competed in the Scottish League.

== Varsity Match ==
Oxford University defeated Cambridge University 3-1 in the Ice Hockey Varsity Match at the Richmond Ice Rink.

== Scottish League ==
=== Regular season ===
==== Group A ====
	Club	GP	W	T	L	GF–GA	Pts
1.	Fife Flyers	14	12	0	2	124:62	24
2.	Murrayfield Royals	18	11	0	7	99:75	18
3.	Durham Wasps	13	7	0	6	103:55	14
4.	Ayr Rangers	11	2	0	9	47:101	4

==== Group B ====
	Club	GP	W	T	L	GF–GA	Pts
1.	Paisley Mohawks	7	3	0	4	35:26	6
2.	Glasgow Flyers	7	0	0	7	9:98	0

==== Final ====
- Fife Flyers 4 - Paisley Mohawks 6
