= 1963–64 British Ice Hockey season =

- Sport: ice hockey

Seasons
- ← 1962–63 1964–65 →

The 1963–64 British Ice Hockey season featured a Scottish League but there was still no league structure in England for the fourth consecutive year. Durham Wasps competed in the Scottish League.

== Scottish League ==
The two groups played an interlocking schedule.

=== Regular season ===
==== Group A ====
| | Club | GP | W | T | L | GF–GA | Pts |
|---|---|---|---|---|---|---|---|
| 1. | Fife Flyers | 14 | 14 | 0 | 0 | 141:21 | 28 |
| 2. | Durham Wasps | 14 | 7 | 2 | 5 | 83:54 | 16 |
| 3. | Ayr Rangers | 14 | 4 | 2 | 8 | 48:85 | 10 |

==== Group B ====
| | Club | GP | W | T | L | GF–GA | Pts |
|---|---|---|---|---|---|---|---|
| 1. | Paisley Mohawks | 6 | 3 | 0 | 3 | 52:24 | 6 |
| 2. | Perth Black Hawks | 6 | 0 | 0 | 6 | 14:63 | 0 |
| 3. | Glasgow Flyers | 6 | 0 | 0 | 6 | 7:71 | 0 |

=== Final ===
- Fife Flyers defeated the Paisley Mohawks
