= Alfie Miller =

British ice hockey player

- Born: 13 April 1954 (age 72) Whitley Bay, England
- Position: Forward
- Played for: Whitley Braves/Warriors
- National team: Great Britain
- Playing career: 1976–1992

Alfred "Alfie" Miller (born 13 April 1954 in Whitley Bay, England) is a former British professional ice hockey player who played for the Whitley Braves and Warriors between 1976 and 1992. He also played in four World Championships for the Great Britain national ice hockey team between 1976 and 1981. He was inducted to the British Ice Hockey Hall of Fame in 1989.
