= TDC Northern Stars =

Ice hockey team in Newcastle, England

Newcastle TDC Northern Stars (Ice Hockey)
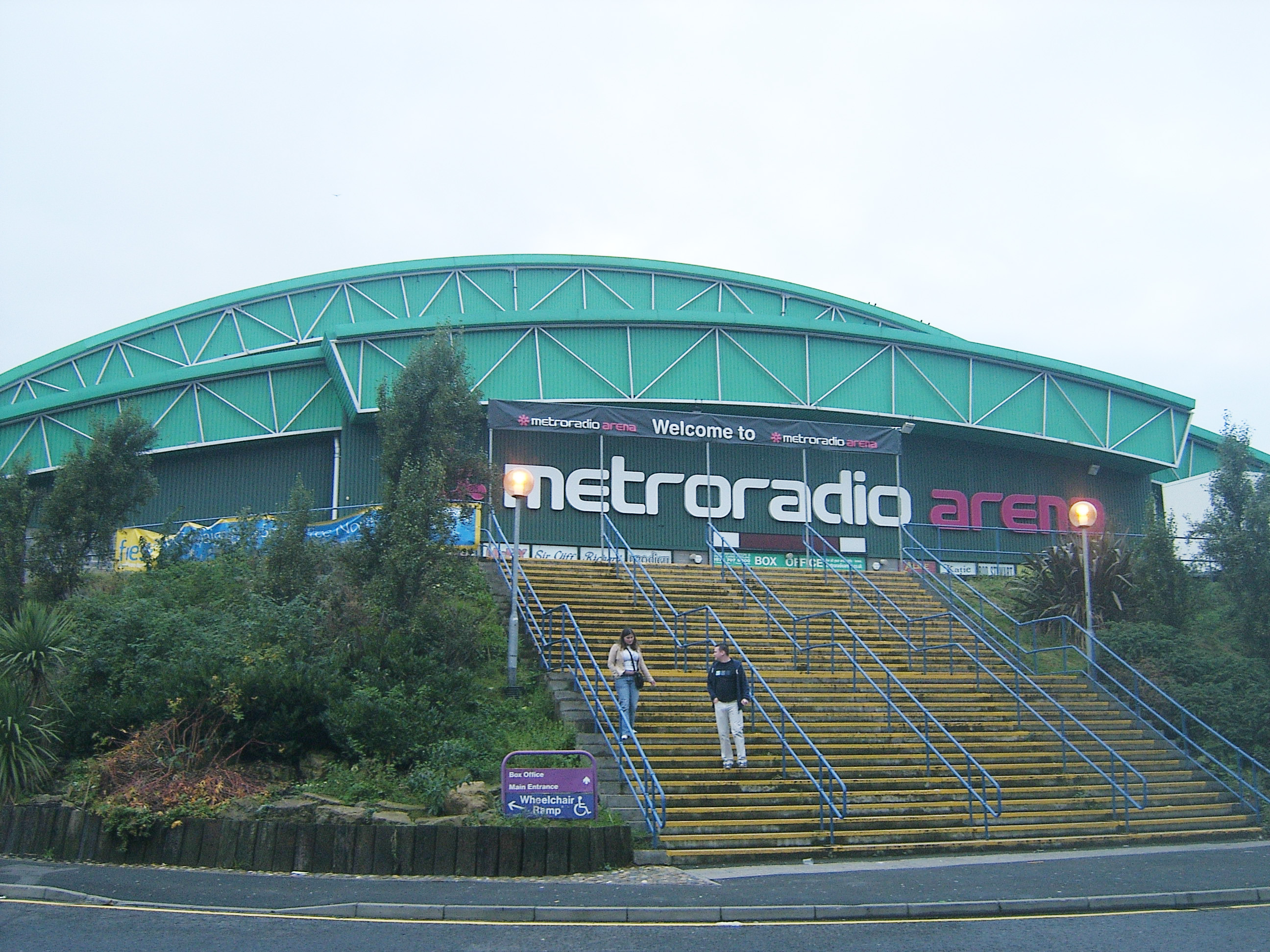
- City: Newcastle, England
- League: ENIHL
- Founded: 2010
- Operated: 2010–2011
- Colours: Blue, Gold, White
- Head coach: Ivor Bennett & Stephen Foster
- Website: northernstarshockey.co.uk

Newcastle TDC Northern Stars were a semi-professional ice hockey team, previously known as the Newcastle ENL Vipers. The Vipers were founded in 2005 and played out of Metro Radio Arena which had a capacity of 5,500. They eventually changed names from the Vipers to the Northern Stars. In 2010 the team moved to Whitley Bay Arena which had a capacity of 3,200. The team was sponsored by TDC Waste Management and competed in the English National Hockey League North 1 Division and the National Ice Hockey League.

Prior to the 2011/12 season the Northern Stars merged with Billingham Bombers to form the Billingham Stars which also compete in the ENL.

== 2010 Team Roster ==
=== Head coach: Ivor Bennett & Stephen Foster ===
Goaltenders

- #01 (United Kingdom) Mark Watson
- #41 (United Kingdom) Mark Thurman

Skaters

- #02 (United Kingdom) Stuart Gibbon
- #04 (United Kingdom) James Udell
- #05 (United Kingdom) James Moss
- #07 (United Kingdom) James Mcabe
- #09 (United Kingdom) Callum Pattison
- #10 (United Kingdom) Richard Emmerson
- #11 (United Kingdom) Martyn Davies
- #12 (United Kingdom) Alex Lawson
- #18 (United Kingdom) Ben Davison
- #21 (United Kingdom) Liam Telfer
- #22 (United Kingdom) Karl Nelson
- #24 (United Kingdom) Jamie Patterson
- #26 (United Kingdom) Simon Hehir
- #31 (United Kingdom) Ross Hanlon
- #32 (United Kingdom) Michael Elder
- #36 (United Kingdom) Callum Davies
- #42 (United Kingdom) Jimmy Moutrey
- #44 (United Kingdom) Anthony Price
- #89 (United Kingdom) Graham Robson

== 2009 Team Roster ==
=== Regular Season: 24-20-2-2 ===
Goaltenders

- G (United Kingdom) Richard Lawson
- G (United Kingdom) Calvin Khass
- G (United Kingdom) Mark Thurman

Defencemen

- D (Canada) Jean-Christophe Andre
- D (United Kingdom) Martyn Davies
- D (United Kingdom) Karl Nelson
- D (United Kingdom) Shane Hewitt
- D (United Kingdom) Marcus Hinkley
- D (Canada) Kevin Corcoran
- D (United Kingdom) Richard Emmerson
- D (United Kingdom) Simon Hehir
- D/F (United States) Mike Hall

Forwards

- F (United Kingdom) Alex Lawson
- F (United Kingdom) Scott Cooper
- F (United Kingdom) Callum Davies
- F (United Kingdom) Nathan Salem
- F (United Kingdom) Michael Elder
- F (United Kingdom) James McCabe
- F (Lithuania) Matas Belevicius
- F (Sweden) Fredrik Nyman
- F (United Kingdom) Peter Zajac
- F (United Kingdom) Stuart Gibbon
- F (United Kingdom) Anthony Price
- F (United Kingdom) Graham Robson
- F (United Kingdom) Nathan Salem
- F (United Kingdom) Paul Shanks
- F (United Kingdom) Andrew Thornton
