= Durham City Wasps =

- City: Durham, England
- League: English League
- Founded: 1995
- Dissolved: 1996
- Home arena: Durham Ice Rink; Capacity: 2860; Ice size: 180ft x 80ft
- Colours: White, Blue, and Gold
- Owner(s): Durham Wasps Enterprises
- Head coach: Roly Barrass

Durham City Wasps were formed during the summer of 1995 after the sale and subsequent relocation of Durham Wasps from Durham Ice Rink announced in May of that year.

The "City Slickers" as they were to become known were pulled together by manager Brian Cooper, father of former Wasps Ian and Stephen Cooper. The team, which played in the English Division 1 (North) was made up primarily of former Wasps, players from Durham's under-19 squad and recreational players.

The team first took to the ice at Sheffield's Queen's Road Ice Rink against the Sheffield Scimitars on 10 September 1995.

The squad was bolstered in January 1996 with the arrival of Zac George – the City Wasps only import player. The team finished fourth in their conference and went on to play against Southern champions Wightlink Raiders in both the League and Cup finals.

Despite attracting sizeable crowds for the level of ice hockey, the team was disbanded in the summer of 1996 after the announcement that their Riverside Rink was to close, ending a 56-year history of ice hockey in Durham.
