= British Hockey League =

Former ice hockey league in the United Kingdom (from 1982 to 1996)

- Sport: Ice hockey
- Founded: 1982
- Folded: 1996
- No. of teams: 12 (Premier Division)
- Country: United Kingdom
- Last champion: Sheffield Steelers
- Broadcaster: BBC

The British League was the top-flight ice hockey league in the United Kingdom from 1982 until 1996, when it was replaced by the Ice Hockey Superleague and the British National League. Note that the league never had 'hockey' in its title. The league replaced three regional leagues: the Inter-City League in southern England, the English League North in northern England and the Northern League in Scotland and northeast England.

The league was sponsored by Heineken until 1993 and during this period was best known as the Heineken League.

The league changed format several times. The top level was originally split into three regional sections and combined as the Premier Division in 1983. Divisions One and Two were also both formed in 1982, there was also a short-lived Division Three. Division Two was reformed as the English League in 1987. In 1996 a major reorganization of the league structure led the two remaining divisions to split into different leagues; resulting in the dissolution of the British Hockey League and the creation of the Ice Hockey Superleague to replace the premier division, and the British National League to replace division 1, respectively.

Durham Wasps, Nottingham Panthers and Whitley Warriors were the only three teams to consistently feature in the top division of the BHL throughout the duration of the league's history.

== Premier Division ==
=== Teams ===
- Altrincham Aces (1982–1983)
- Ayr Bruins (1982–1992)
- Basingstoke Bison (1993–1996)
- Billingham Stars (1982–1987, 1990–1994)
- Blackpool Seagulls (1982–1983)
- Bracknell Bees (1991–1995)
- Cardiff Devils (1989–1996)
- Dundee Rockets (1982–1989)
- Durham Wasps (1982–1996)
- Fife Flyers (1982–1991, 1992–1996)
- Glasgow Dynamos (1982–1983)
- Humberside Seahawks (1991–1996)
- Milton Keynes Kings (1994–1996)
- Murrayfield Racers (1982–1995)
- Nottingham Panthers (1982–1996)
- Peterborough Pirates (1985–1986, 1987–1995)
- Richmond Flyers (1982–1983)
- Sheffield Steelers (1993–1996)
- Slough Jets (1995–1996)
- Solihull Barons (1986–1991)
- Southampton Vikings (1982–1983, 1984–1985)
- Streatham Redskins (1982–1989)
- Sunderland Chiefs (1982–1983)
- Whitley Warriors (1982–1996)

=== Champions ===
- 1982/83 Dundee Rockets (section A and Overall Champions) / Durham Wasps (section B) / Altrincham Aces (section C)
- 1983/84 Dundee Rockets
- 1984/85 Durham Wasps
- 1985/86 Durham Wasps
- 1986/87 Murrayfield Racers
- 1987/88 Murrayfield Racers
- 1988/89 Durham Wasps
- 1989/90 Cardiff Devils
- 1990/91 Durham Wasps
- 1991/92 Durham Wasps
- 1992/93 Cardiff Devils
- 1993/94 Cardiff Devils
- 1994/95 Sheffield Steelers
- 1995/96 Sheffield Steelers

== Division One (including English League since 1987) ==
=== Teams ===
- Altrincham Aces (1983–1985)
- Aviemore Blackhawks (1987–1988)
- Ayr Bruins (1992–1993)
- Basingstoke Bison (1990–1993)
- Billingham Stars (1987–1990, 1994–1996)
- Blackburn Hawks (1991–1992, 1993–1996)
- Blackpool Seagulls (1983–1985, 1986–1988)
- Bournemouth Stags (1983–1985, 1986–1987)
- Bracknell Bees (1990–1991, 1995–1996)
- Cardiff Devils (1987–1989)
- Chelmsford Chieftains (1993–1996)
- Deeside Dragons (1983–1985, 1987–1989)
- Dumfries Vikings (1993–1996)
- Fife Flyers (1991–1992)
- Glasgow Dynamos (1983–1985, 1986–1989, 1990–1991)
- Grimsby Red Wings (1983–1985)
- Guildford Flames (1993–1996)
- Humberside Seahawks (1989–1991)
- Irvine Wings (1986–1987)
- Kirkcaldy Kestrels (1986–1988)
- Lee Valley Lions (1984–1985, 1986–1995)
- London Raiders (1988–1989, 1990–1995)
- Manchester Storm (1995–1996)
- Medway Bears (1986–1991, 1992–1996)
- Milton Keynes Kings (1991–1994)
- Murrayfield Racers (1995–1996)
- Oxford City Stars (1986–1987, 1993–1994)
- Paisley Pirates (1993–1996)
- Peterborough Pirates (1983–1985, 1986–1987, 1995–1996)
- Richmond Flyers (1983–1985, 1986–1989)
- Sheffield Steelers (1992–1993)
- Slough Jets (1986–1995)
- Solihull Barons (1983–1985, 1993–1996)
- Southampton Vikings (1983–1984, 1986–1988)
- Streatham Redskins (1989–1990, 1993–1994)
- Sunderland Chiefs (1983–1985, 1986–1989)
- Swindon Wildcats (1986–1996)
- Telford Tigers (1986–1996)
- Trafford Metros (1986–1992, 1993–1995)

=== Champions ===
- 1983/84 Southampton Vikings
- 1984/85 Peterborough Pirates
- 1985/86 Solihull Barons
- 1986/87 Peterborough Pirates
- 1987/88 Telford Tigers (north) / Billingham Stars (south)
- 1988/89 Cardiff Devils
- 1989/90 Slough Jets
- 1990/91 Humberside Seahawks
- 1991/92 Fife Flyers
- 1992/93 Basingstoke Bison
- 1993/94 Milton Keynes Kings (north) / Slough Jets (south)
- 1994/95 Slough Jets
- 1995/96 Manchester Storm

== English League Division One ==
=== Teams ===
- Basingstoke Bison (1988–1990)
- Birmingham Eagles (1987–1989)
- Blackburn Hawks (1990–1991)
- Bournemouth Stags (1987–1988)
- Bracknell Bees (1987–1990)
- Bristol Phantoms (1987–1988)
- Chelmsford Chieftains (1987–1992)
- Deeside Demons (1987–1988)
- Harringay Racers (1990–1992)
- Humberside Seahawks (1988–1989)
- London Raiders (1987–1988, 1989–1990)
- Medway Bears (1991–1992)
- Medway Marauders (1987–1988)
- Milton Keynes Kings (1990–1991)
- Oxford City Stars (1987–1992)
- Peterborough Titans (1987–1989)
- Richmond Flyers (1990–1991)
- Richmond Raiders (1987–1988)
- Sheffield Sabres (1989–1992)
- Solihull Barons (1991–1992)
- Solihull Knights (1987–1989)
- Southampton Knights (1987–1988)
- Streatham Bruins (1987–1988)
- Streatham Redskins (1991–1992)
- Sunderland Chiefs (1989–1992)
- Wightlink Raiders (1991–1992)

=== Champions ===
- 1987/88 London Raiders
- 1988/89 Humberside Seahawks
- 1989/90 Bracknell Bees
- 1990/91 Milton Keynes Kings
- 1991/92 Medway Bears

== See also ==
- British ice hockey league champions
