= Billingham Stars =

- City: Billingham, England
- League: NIHL
- Division: Division 1 North
- Founded: 1971
- Home arena: Billingham Forum Ice Arena
- Colours: Red, White, Black
- General manager: Allen Flavell
- Head coach: Richie Thornton, Stephen Foster
- Captain: Michael Elder
- Media: https://www.starshockey.co.uk/

Franchise history
- 1971–1982: Billingham Bombers
- 1982–1992: Cleveland Bombers
- 1992–1993: Billingham Bombers
- 1993–1995: Teesside Bombers
- 1995–1996: Billingham Bombers
- 1996–2002: Billingham Eagles
- 2002–2009: Billingham Bombers
- 2011-Current: Billingham Stars (ENL)

Championships
- Regular season titles: 1998/1999, 1999/2000, 2000/2001, 2005/2006, 2011/2012, 2023/2024, 2024/2025
- Playoff championships: 1998/1999, 2011/2012, 2024/2025

The Billingham Stars are an ice hockey team from the town of Billingham in the borough of Stockton-on-Tees in Teesside. They are currently members of the National Ice Hockey League playing in its Division 1 North (Moralee Conference). The Stars play their home games at the Billingham Forum.

The Stars are currently coached by ex-Durham Wasps player Stephen Foster and former Billingham player Richie Thornton.

Notable ex-Billingham players include current GB International and Sheffield Steelers Robert Dowd and Patrice Lefebvre who went on to play 3 games in the NHL for the Washington Capitals.

== History ==
The Billingham Bombers were founded in 1971 as members of the Northern League. In 1982 they became a founder member of the British Hockey League and changed their name to the Cleveland Bombers. Between 1991 and 1995 the team played under the name of the Teesside Bombers before reverting to their original name. Between 1982 and 1986 and again between 1990 and 1994, the Bombers played in the Premier League, the top flight division of British ice hockey at the time.

In more recent times the Bombers won the English League Northern section regular season championship and Northern section play off championship during the 2005–06 season.

The Billingham Bombers did not compete in any league due to a refurbishment of their home venue TFM Radio Ice Arena in the 2009/10 and 2010/11 seasons

Ice Hockey returned to the forum in the 2011/12 seasons after merging with the Northern Stars who were facing problems with their home rink, the Metro Radio Arena. The new club was renamed Billingham Stars.

In 2011/12, the club's first season back following two seasons away from Ice Hockey, Billingham Stars were successful in their attempt to become champions of the English National League, Northern Division. The Championship was finally won with the penultimate league match, at home to Trafford Metros in a 2–2 draw, giving Billingham the final point required to ensure the title.

In 2012/13 Billingham Stars finished as runners up to Solway Sharks for both the League and Cup as well as runners up to the Blackburn Hawks in the end of season playoffs.

In 2013/14 season Billingham finished the season in 3rd position and were knocked out of the end of season Playoffs by 2nd placed Blackburn Hawks.

In the 2014/15 season Billingham finished 2nd to Blackburn Hawks, whilst also making the end of season playoff finals at Dumfries, Scotland. Billingham Stars lost the playoff final game vs Blackburn Hawks.

In 2015/16 season Billingham failed to make the Playoffs finishing in 5th position. However, as a consolation they did win the Northern Cup Competition.

Billingham Stars won the 2023/24 English National League, Northern Division championship, confirming the title with a 3-0 away win against Hull Jets. They collected the trophy at their next home game, the following day, against Solihull Barons. They also reached the playoff final, but lost to Blackburn Hawks on a shootout.

In the 2024/25 season, Billingham won the Moralee Cip (formerly the Northern Cup), with a 9-8 win on aggregate against Blackburn Hawks. They went on to win the English National League, Northern Division championship, doing so with a 8-4 away win at Solihull Barons. Then Billingham won a third trophy, winning the Playoff final against Blackburn Hawks 6-3. This led to them entering the first national playoff championship final against the Division One South play-off winners Slough Jets. Billingham won the match 5-4 in overtime, resulting in a fourth trophy for the season. They then played against Slough again in the Division One Championship final, but lost 6-1.

== Club roster 2022-23 ==
(*) Denotes a Non-British Trained player (Import)

Netminders
No.	Nat.	Player	Catches	Date of birth	Place of birth	Acquired	Contract
2	(England)	Jacob Hammond		2004 (age 18)	England	2021 from Billingham U18	22/23
30	(England) (Canada)	Thomas Brown	L	20 July 2000 (age 25)	Middlesbrough, England	2018 from Whitley Warriors	22/23
31	(England)	Ryan Wardell	L	30 January 2005 (age 21)	Sunderland, England	2021 from Billingham U18	22/23

Defencemen
No.	Nat.	Player	Shoots	Date of birth	Place of birth	Acquired	Contract
7	(England)	Benjamin Greenhalgh		2005 (age 17)	England	2021 from Billingham U18	22/23
12	(England)	Tommy Spraggon	R	26 January 2005 (age 21)	Billingham, England	2021 from Billingham U18	Two-Way
14	(England)	James Hellens		2001 (age 21)	England	2018 from Billingham U18	22/23
26	(Latvia)	Rolands Gritāns*	L	19 January 1991 (age 35)	Daugavpils, Latvia	2022 from Whitley Warriors	22/23
38	(England)	Stuart Jackson		2002 (age 20)	England	2019 from Billingham U20	22/23
62	(Latvia)	Patriks Grigors*	L	19 February 2001 (age 24)	Jelgava, Latvia	2021 from Dundee Comets	22/23
81	(England)	Joseph Dowdle		2001 (age 21)	England	2019 from Billingham U20	22/23

Forwards
No.	Nat.	Player	Shoots	Date of birth	Place of birth	Acquired	Contract
5	(England)	James Moss		1 June 1992 (age 33)	England	2010 from Northern Stars	22/23
6	(England)	Samuel Dowd		2005 (age 17)	England	2022 from Billingham U18	22/23
8	(England)	Joseph Walls		2003 (age 19)	England	2019 from Billingham U18	22/23
15	(England)	Chris Sykes 'A'	L	5 January 1992 (age 34)	Sheffield, England	2014 from Sutton Sting	22/23
19	(England)	Shaun Galloway	R	14 January 2001 (age 25)	Bishop Auckland, England	2018 from Billingham U20	22/23
23	(England)	Jack Emerson	L	19 September 1996 (age 29)	Easington, England	2021 from Billingham U18	22/23
32	(England)	Michael Elder 'C'	R	24 June 1993 (age 32)	Durham, England	2011 from Northern Stars	22/23
33	(England)	Finley Bradon	R	24 November 2005 (age 20)	Darlington, England	2021 from Billingham U18	Two-Way
40	(England)	Ethan McLaughlin		2003 (age 19)	England	2022 from Whitley U20	22/23
70	(England)	Callum Wilkinson	L	24 February 2002 (age 23)	England	2019 from Billingham U20	22/23
77	(England)	Lewis Hall		1999 (age 23)	England	2021 from Billingham U20	22/23
88	(England)	Lucas Dowdle		2005 (age 17)	England	2021 from Billingham U18	22/23
98	(England)	Alex Preston	L	31 January 1998 (age 28)	Billingham, England	2021 from Tornado Luxembourg	22/23

Team Staff
No.	Nat.	Name	Acquired	Role	Place of birth	Joined from
	(England)	Stephen Foster	2011/12	Coach	Durham, England	Northern Stars, ENL
	(England)	Robert Wilkinson	2021/22	Coach	England	Billingham U20, England U20
32	(England)	Michael Elder	2022/23	Player-Assistant Coach	Durham, England

== 2021/22 Outgoing ==
Outgoing
No.	Nat.	Player	Shoots	Date of birth	Place of birth	Leaving For
25	(England)	Lewis Crisp		1999 (age 23)	England	Whitley Warriors, NIHL 1

== Retired Numbers ==
Billingham Stars Retired Numbers
No.	Player	Position	Career
1	Terry Ward	G	1981–1993
13	James Flavell	G	2004-2019
29	Andrew Fletcher	F	1995–2012
9	Paul Windridge	F	1989-2017
10	Scott Ward	F	1997-2018

== Club Records ==
=== League titles ===
The Billingham Stars celebrating at the Billingham Forum, having received the trophy for winning the NIHL Division 1 North Moralee Conference during the 2023/24 season.

- ED1: 2 (1998/99, 1999/00)
- ENL: 5 (2000/01, 2005/06, 2011/12, 2023/24, 2024/25)

=== Play-Off Titles ===
- ED1 Playoffs: 1 (1998/99)
- ENL Playoffs: 3 (2000/01, 2011/12, 2024/25)
- National Playoffs: 1 (2024/25)

=== Cup Titles ===
- NIHL Northern Cup / Moralee Cup: 2 (2015/16, 2024/25)

=== Individual Records ===
- Most Games Played: Paul Windridge (569)
- Most Goals Scored (All Time): Paul Windridge (367)
- Most Assists (All Time): Paul Windridge (712)
- Most Points Scored (All Time): Paul Windridge (1,079)
- Most Penalty Minutes (All Time): Scott Ward (644)
- Most Goals Scored in a Season: John Hutchings (120) (1987/88)
- Most Assists in a Season: Pat Mangold (136) (1987/88)
- Most Points Scored in a Season: Pat Mangold (252) (1987/88)
- Most Penalty Minutes in a Season: Ricky Box (187) (2006/07)
