= Southern League (ice hockey) =

Former ice hockey league in southern England

The Southern League was the top-flight ice hockey league for clubs in the majority of England from 1970. It was formed as the counterpart to the clubs in Scotland and the north of England called the Northern League. In 1978, its southern-based clubs broke away and formed the Inter-City League and the remaining clubs continued as the Southern League, known also as the English League North in 1981-82. A Second or "B" Division and a junior league was also contested in most seasons.

== Champions ==
- 1970-71: Sussex Senators
- 1971-72: Sussex Senators
- 1972-73: Altrincham Aces
- 1973-74: Streatham Redskins
- 1974-75: Streatham Redskins
- 1975-76: Streatham Redskins
- 1976-77: Streatham Redskins
- 1977-78: Solihull Barons

== Notes ==
Sussex Senators were coached by ex Paisley player Scot - Joe Conway led the senators on their first season. All games played away as there was no home rink. Brighton was a silver blades rink for figure skating. Players such as Mike O'Brien, Jim Thomson, John Rost and John Baxter played during the two seasons that Senators won the league.
