= Dundee Rockets =

- City: Dundee, Scotland
- League: British League Northern League Scottish National League
- Founded: 1963
- Operated: 1963–1987; 2024–present
- Home arena: Kingsway Ice Rink, Dundee (1963–1987); Dundee Ice Arena (2024–present)
- Colors: Red Blue
- Head coach: Jeff Hutchins

Championships
- Regular season titles: 1972–73, 1981–82, 1982–83, 1983–84, 2024–25
- Autumn Cups: 1983–84
- Playoff championships: 1981–82, 1982–83, 1983–84

The Dundee Rockets are an ice hockey club based in Dundee, Scotland. Founded in 1963, the club were members of the Northern League between 1969 and 1982 and, from 1982, the British Hockey League. The club won eight titles in total before closing in 1987. In 2024, it was announced that the Dundee Rockets would reform after 37 years, with their first match being held in the September of that year.

== History ==
=== 1963–80: Early years and first wins ===
In 1963, the Dundee Rockets were founded. They took on the Tigers home ice and colours, although they wore a yellow and black strip in the mid to late 1960s. The head coach from 1969 to 1971 was Marshall Key. The Rockets early on established themselves as a force within Scottish ice hockey after winning the Northern League in 1972-73 and 1981–82. Although the team faced tough competition in the British National League, they steadily improved through the late 1960s and early 1970s. During this period, the Rockets attracted skilled players from both Scotland and abroad, including several notable imports from Canada, which was then the dominant ice hockey nation.

=== 1980–84: Golden years ===
The 1980s marked the most successful period in the Dundee Rockets' history where they achieved unprecedented success. During this period, the Rockets won the Northern League in 1972-73 and 1981–82, the Scottish National League in 1981–82, and the British Championship in 1982. From 1983 to 1987 the Rockets played in the British Hockey League Premier Division, winning the league in 1982-83 (Section A) and 1983–84. They won the Heineken Championship in 1983 and 1984, and the Bluecol Autumn Cup in 1983–84.

=== 1985–87: Final years ===
Despite their earlier successes, the Dundee Rockets faced challenges coming into the late 1980s, including financial difficulties and changes in the structure of British ice hockey. As other clubs invested heavily in new players and facilities, the Rockets struggled to keep pace. Their fortunes declined steadily throughout the decade, and they were eventually forced to fold in 1987,

=== 2024: Reformation ===
On 26 June 2024, Dundee Rockets announced their return with their intention to play as part of the 2024-25 Scottish National League. Their first game was played on 28 September 2024 against the Aberdeen Lynx. They lost the game 2–1. The Rockets would go on to win the SNL by 8 points.

== Honours ==
- Northern League: 1972–73, 1981–82
- British Championship: 1981–82, 1982–83, 1983–84
- British Hockey League: 1982–83, 1983–84
- Autumn Cup: 1983-84
- SNL: 2024-25
- SNL Playoffs: 2025-26
- Scottish Cup: 2024-25

The Dundee Rockets also won the grandslam ( all the trophies there is to win in one season ) three years in a row. Trophies Won by original Rockets are in italics

== Head coaches ==
Name	Nationality	Tenure
1963–1987
Marshall Key	Scotland	1969–1971
2024–present
Jeff Hutchins	Canada	2024–present

== Jerseys ==
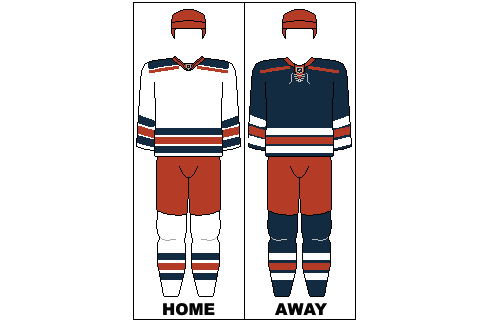
The uniform of the Dundee Rockets used in the British Hockey League season 1983-84
