= British Championship (ice hockey) =

Ice hockey championship

See British Home Championship for the football competition. -

The British Championship is the most “prestigious” ice hockey cup competition in the United Kingdom, and also the longest established ice hockey competition.

The competition is effectively the post-season playoffs of the first-tier league in the country to determine the British champions for the season. They are therefore held after the regular season, whereby the positions in the league ladder determine entry and seeding. The first placed team in the league is considered to have won the national league title as a separate title, but the British champion for the season is historically considered to be the winner of the post-season playoffs.

In its current format, the eight highest placed teams in the first-tier Elite Ice Hockey League contest quarter finals, the winners going on to semi finals and then the deciding one-leg final.

== Early years ==
There were three instances of an early championship; the first was in the 1929-30 British Ice Hockey season which was the inaugural season of organised league ice hockey in Britain. The championship was won by London Lions when known as the Patton Cup. The second edition the following season was abandoned after Manchester and Glasgow couldn't agree on dates for their semi-final tie. The winner was to have met the English Club champions London Lions in the final. The third instance took place during the 1959–60 British National League season.

== Modern edition ==
From 1966 it became an annual event when known as the Icy Smith Cup and then after 1982 it had several sponsors and names including the Heineken Championship Cup and latterly as the Sekonda Playoff Championship Cup. Some contests were only recognised as representing the Championship retroactively. At present, the Championship is just known as EIHL Playoffs.

== Champions ==
Season	Winner	Runner-up
1930	London Lions (1)	Glasgow Mohawks
1960	Brighton Tigers (1)	Nottingham Panthers
1966	Murrayfield Racers (1)	Durham Hornets
1967	Glasgow Dynamos (1)	Murrayfield Racers
1968	Paisley Mohawks (1)	Durham Wasps
1969	Murrayfield Racers (2)	Glasgow Dynamos
1970	Murrayfield Racers (3)	Glasgow Dynamos
1971	Murrayfield Racers (4)	Durham Wasps
1972	Murrayfield Racers (5)	Fife Flyers
1973	Whitley Warriors (1)	Murrayfield Racers
1974	Whitley Warriors (2)	Streatham Redskins
1975	Murrayfield Racers (6)	Streatham Redskins
1976	Ayr Bruins (1)	Streatham Redskins
1977	Fife Flyers (1)	Southampton Vikings
1978	Fife Flyers (2)	Southampton Vikings
1979	Murrayfield Racers (7)	Streatham Redskins
1980	Murrayfield Racers (8)	Solihull Barons
1981	Murrayfield Racers (9)	Streatham Redskins
1982	Dundee Rockets (1)	Streatham Redskins
1983	Dundee Rockets (2)	Durham Wasps
1984	Dundee Rockets (3)	Murrayfield Racers
1985	Fife Flyers (3)	Murrayfield Racers
1986	Murrayfield Racers (10)	Dundee Rockets
1987	Durham Wasps (1)	Murrayfield Racers
1988	Durham Wasps (2)	Fife Flyers
1989	Nottingham Panthers (1)	Ayr Bruins
1990	Cardiff Devils (1)	Murrayfield Racers
1991	Durham Wasps (3)	Peterborough Pirates
1992	Durham Wasps (4)	Nottingham Panthers
1993	Cardiff Devils (2)	Humberside Seahawks
1994	Cardiff Devils (3)	Sheffield Steelers
1995	Sheffield Steelers (1)	Murrayfield Racers
1996	Sheffield Steelers (2)	Nottingham Panthers
1997	Sheffield Steelers (3)	Nottingham Panthers
1998	Ayr Scottish Eagles (1)	Cardiff Devils
1999	Cardiff Devils (4)	Nottingham Panthers
2000	London Knights (1)	Newcastle Riverkings
2001	Sheffield Steelers (4)	London Knights
2002	Sheffield Steelers (5)	Manchester Storm
2003	Belfast Giants (1)	London Knights
2004	Sheffield Steelers (6)	Nottingham Panthers
2005	Coventry Blaze (1)	Nottingham Panthers
2006	Newcastle Vipers (1)	Sheffield Steelers
2007	Nottingham Panthers (2)	Cardiff Devils
2008	Sheffield Steelers (7)	Coventry Blaze
2009	Sheffield Steelers (8)	Nottingham Panthers
2010	Belfast Giants (2)	Cardiff Devils
2011	Nottingham Panthers (3)	Cardiff Devils
2012	Nottingham Panthers (4)	Cardiff Devils
2013	Nottingham Panthers (5)	Belfast Giants
2014	Sheffield Steelers (9)	Belfast Giants
2015	Coventry Blaze (2)	Sheffield Steelers
2016	Nottingham Panthers (6)	Coventry Blaze
2017	Sheffield Steelers (10)	Cardiff Devils
2018	Cardiff Devils (5)	Sheffield Steelers
2019	Cardiff Devils (6)	Belfast Giants
2020–21	Did not take place due to COVID-19	
2022	Cardiff Devils (7)	Belfast Giants
2023	Belfast Giants (3)	Cardiff Devils
2024	Sheffield Steelers (11)	Belfast Giants
2025	Nottingham Panthers (7)	Cardiff Devils
2026	Cardiff Devils (8)	Sheffield Steelers
