= Northern League (ice hockey, 1966–1982) =

UK sports league

The Northern League was the top-flight ice hockey league in Scotland and initially northern England, from 1966. In 1982 it merged with the Inter-City League and the English League North to form the British Hockey League.

The League developed out of the far more limited Scottish League, established in 1962. In 1963, The Wasps, based at Whitley Bay, joined and by 1966 a regular but limited schedule had been established.

In 1966, the better British teams, mostly in Scotland, agreed to form a league to provide matches throughout the season. Initially of seven teams joined. It proved a success, and in 1970 various English teams formed a Southern League, leaving the Northern League as an entirely Scottish competition.

== Champions ==
- 1966–67 Paisley Mohawks
- 1967–68 Paisley Mohawks
- 1968–69 Paisley Mohawks
- 1969–70 Murrayfield Racers
- 1970–71 Murrayfield Racers
- 1971–72 Murrayfield Racers
- 1972–73 Dundee Rockets
- 1973–74 Whitley Bay Warriors
- 1974–75 Whitley Bay Warriors
- 1975–76 Murrayfield Racers
- 1976–77 Fife Flyers
- 1977–78 Fife Flyers
- 1978–79 Murrayfield Racers
- 1979–80 Murrayfield Racers
- 1980–81 Murrayfield Racers
- 1981–82 Dundee Rockets
