= Durham Wasps =

Durham Wasps The Big Blue Machine
- City: Durham, England
- League: British National League
- Founded: 1947
- Operated: 1947–1996
- Home arena: Durham Ice Rink; Capacity: 2860; Ice size: 184ft x 85ft, 56m x 26m
- Colours: Royal Blue and Gold
- Owner: Defunct

The Durham Wasps were an ice hockey team located in Durham and was one of England's best-known names in ice hockey. The team was bought by Sir John Hall and moved to the neighbouring city of Newcastle Upon Tyne in August 1996. The Newcastle team, after several changes became known as the Newcastle Jesters.

== The History of the Wasps ==
The Durham Wasps began their prosperous start to hockey just after the war, and were started by Michael Davey of Ottawa, Ontario, Canada, along with a few other Canadians, who after the war made their homes in Durham.

Ice hockey remained popular in the 1960s and 1970s, but it exploded with popularity between the 1980s and 1990s, and the period from around 1982 to 1992 was one to remember for the Wasps. In this period alone they won the Heineken Championship four times, the league championship six times, the Norwich Cup three times, and other trophies like the Autumn and Castle Eden Cups on many other occasions. The Durham Wasps dominated the British League for over 10 years. There was an intense local rivalry with both the Whitley Warriors and the Billingham Bombers. It was a golden period for hockey in the North East with derby matches against the Warriors often resulting in crowds which exceeded the stated capacity of the rink by a considerable margin.

With the rise of teams such as the Cardiff Devils and Sheffield Steelers, the Wasps started to struggle to fund a competitive team. At the same time, the rink was in need of significant investment. Around this time, John Hall, then owner of Newcastle United Football Club, laid plans to form a centre of sporting excellence in Newcastle. As part of this he purchased the team with the intention of moving them to a new ice rink in Newcastle. In the meanwhile, the team temporarily played out of the Crowtree Leisure Centre in Sunderland.

This proved very divisive amongst Wasps fans with many to this day refusing to watch ice hockey in Newcastle. A replacement team was established in Durham called the Durham City Wasps who played in the English League. This featured some players who the new Wasps owners decided not to retain, as well as players from the junior teams. The team only lasted one season before the costs of maintaining the rink came to a head and the rink was sold to be redeveloped.

The plans for a new rink in Newcastle came to nothing so a deal was made which resulted in the Whitley Warriors being evicted from the Telewest Arena to make way for the team. After a season of playing out of Crowtree, Wasps were taken to Newcastle and renamed the Newcastle Cobras. In the next few years they changed owners and names from the Cobras, to the Riverkings, to the Jesters, however, the franchise folded soon after.

A new unrelated team, the Newcastle Vipers were founded in 2002 to keep the city's ice hockey heritage alive, but due to low crowds and problems getting regular ice time at the Arena, in November 2010 the Vipers were forced to move in with the 'old enemy' and play for part of their final season out of the Hillheads rink in Whitley Bay. It proved impossible to keep the team going and the 2010/11 season was the last featuring a Newcastle team.

== Revival Games ==
Originally a one-off game, former Durham Wasps players from the 1980s and 1990s reformed to play former local rivals Whitley Warriors on 4 May 2008 at Whitley Bay Ice Rink, commemorating the 60th anniversary of the formation of the club, and in support of the ongoing campaign to bring back an ice rink. Over 2,300 fans turned up to witness this encounter which saw Wasps players icing once again including the Johnson brothers, Mario Belanger, Ivor Bennett, Stephen Foster, John Hutley and Karl Walker. The reformed Wasps team won the game 8–4.

A second 'Legends' game was played with Whitley Warriors, Sunday 6 May 2012, again at Whitley Bay, and in memory of former Durham Wasps manager Kenny Swinburne. The Wasps won 5–2 with Mario Belanger scoring within 30 seconds in the first period.

== Honours ==
Heineken Premier League Champions

- 1985, 1986, 1989, 1991, 1992

Heineken British Championship Winners

- 1987, 1988, 1991, 1992

Autumn Cup Winners

- 1984, 1988, 1989, 1991

Castle Eden Cup Winners

- 1986, 1987, 1988, 1989, 1990, 1991, 1992, 1994, 1995

British Ice Hockey Association Cup

- 1950

Northern Ice Hockey League Champions

- 1950

Preceded by Dundee Rockets	Premier League Champions; 1984–85, 1985–86	Succeeded by Murrayfield Racers
Preceded by Dundee Rockets	Autumn Cup Winners; 1984–85	Succeeded by Murrayfield Racers
Preceded by Murrayfield Racers	Playoff Champions; 1986–87, 1987–88	Succeeded by Nottingham Panthers
Preceded by Nottingham Panthers	Autumn Cup Winners; 1987–88, 1988–89	Succeeded by Murrayfield Racers
Preceded by Murrayfield Racers	Premier League Champions; 1988–89	Succeeded by Cardiff Devils
Preceded by Cardiff Devils	Premier League Champions; 1990–91, 1991–92	Succeeded by Cardiff Devils
Preceded by Cardiff Devils	Playoff Champions; 1990–91, 1991–92	Succeeded by Cardiff Devils
Preceded by Murrayfield Racers	Autumn Cup Winners; 1990–91	Succeeded by Nottingham Panthers
