= Whitley Warriors =

Ice hockey team in Whitley Bay, England

- City: Whitley Bay, Tyne and Wear, England
- League: Scottish National League (SNL)
- Division: Division One North
- Founded: 1957
- Home arena: Whitley Bay Ice Rink
- Colours: Maroon, gold, white
- General manager: Willie Dunn
- Head coach: Tony Hand
- Website: whitleywarriors.net

The Whitley Warriors are an ice hockey team based in Whitley Bay in the north east of England. Founded in 1957 as the Bees, they changed their name to the Whitley Warriors in 1964. The Warriors played at the highest level of British ice hockey for much of their history but currently play in the Scottish National League (SNL).

Ahead of the 2025-26 season, the Warriors moved from the NIHL North Division 1 to the Scottish National League (SNL) due to fixture scheduling issues while continuing to play their home games at Whitley Bay Ice Rink.

== Club roster 2022-23 ==
(*) Denotes a Non-British Trained player (Import)

Netminders
No.	Nat.	Player	Catches	Date of birth	Place of birth	Acquired	Contract
30	(England)	Mark Turnbull	L	15 May 1995 (age 31)	Northumberland, England	2021 from Billingham Stars	22/23
32	(England)	Joshua Crane	L	29 October 1998 (age 27)	Coventry, England	2021 from Nottingham Lions	22/23
	(England)	Jack Wakefield	L	29 December 2002 (age 23)	Durham, England	2022 from Åmåls SK J20	22/23

Defencemen
No.	Nat.	Player	Shoots	Date of birth	Place of birth	Acquired	Contract
5	(England)	Matthew McDonald		2000 (age 22)	England	2021 from Whitley U20	22/23
13	(England)	Kyle Ross	R	28 July 1997 (age 29)	Whitley Bay, England	2017 from Essa Stallions	22/23
22	(England)	Adam Wood	R	4 July 1990 (age 36)	Somerset, England	2021 from Streatham IHC	22/23
24	(England)	Harry Harley 'A'	L	15 May 1995 (age 31)	Whitley Bay, England	2018 from Hull Pirates	22/23
78	(Latvia)	Rihards Grigors*	L	20 January 1992 (age 34)	Dobele, Latvia	2021 from Fife Flyers	22/23

Forwards
No.	Nat.	Player	Shoots	Date of birth	Place of birth	Acquired	Contract
7	(England)	Thomas Fraser	R	2003 (age 19)	England	2019 from Whitley U20	22/23
11	(England)	Shaun Kippin 'A'	L	15 April 1987 (age 39)	England	2015 from Deeside Dragons	22/23
14	(England)	Dean Holland 'C'	R	22 September 1988 (age 38)	Newcastle, England	2014 from Guildford Flames	22/23
15	(England)	Anthony Wetherell		1999 (age 23)	England	2016 from Whitley U18	22/23
16	(England)	Lewis Crisp		1999 (age 23)	England	2022 from Billingham Stars	22/23
18	(Czech Republic)	Matěj Valiček*	L	30 January 1998 (age 28)	Czechia	2021 from HC Baník Sokolov B	22/23
20	(United Kingdom) (Canada)	Philip Edgar	L	6 October 1993 (age 33)	Kitchener, ON, Canada	2017 from University of Waterloo	22/23
27	(England)	Jamie Ord		4 March 2001 (age 25)	England	2016 from Whitley U18	22/23
31	(England)	Adam Finlinson	L	17 April 1998 (age 28)	Whitley Bay, England	2017 from Swindon Wildcats	22/23
37	(England)	Matthew Betham		2004 (age 18)	England	2021 from Whitley U20	22/23
51	(England)	Connor Lewis		2005 (age 17)	England	2021 from Billingham Stars	22/23
57	(England)	Callum Queenan	R	3 October 1996 (age 30)	Whitley Bay, England	2019 from Meaford Knights	22/23

== 2021/22 Outgoing ==
Outgoing
No.	Nat.	Player	Shoots	Date of birth	Place of birth	Leaving For
12	(England)	Dylan Hehir	R	2002 (age 20)	Billingham, England	Leeds Knights, NIHL
26	(Latvia)	Rolands Gritans	L	19 January 1991 (age 35)	Daugavpils, Latvia	Billingham Stars, NIHL 1

== Honours ==
British Championship: Winners – 1972/73, 1973/74

English National League Championship: Winners – 1999/2000, 2000/01, 2001/02, 2007/08

English National League: Runners-up – 1997/98

Northern League: Winners – 1973/74, 1974/75 Runners-up – 1976/77, 1977/78, 2006/07, 2010/11

Northern League Play-offs: Winners: 2006/07 Runners-up – 1967/68, 1976/77

English National League North: Winners – 2001/02, 2009/10, 2010/11 Runners-up – 1997/98, 1999/00, 2000/01, 2006/07, 2007/08

English Cup: Winners – 2001/02 Runners-up – 2000/01

Anglo Scottish Cup: Winners – 2000/01

Scottish Cup: Winners – 1991/92, Runners-up – 1992/93

Heineken British Premier League: Runners-up – 1987/88

Benson & Hedges Cup: Runners-up – 1992/93

Autumn Cup: Winners – 1971/72 Runners-up – 1972/73, 1974/75, 1976/77

BIHA Cup: Winners – 1957/58, 1958/59 (as Whitley Bees)

NIHL North Cup: Runners-up – 2019/20 Runners-up – 2021/22

NIHL North Division 1 Moralee: Winners - 2019/20 Runners-up – 2021/22

Ice Hockey Journalists UK Hall of Fame: Terry Matthews (1987), Alfie Miller (1988), J.J. 'Icy' Smith (1988), Hilton Ruggles (2009), David Longstaff (2022)

== Junior teams ==
The Warriors have numerous junior teams, The teams are:

- Under 9 - Mischiefs
- Under 11 - Arrows
- Under 13 - Mohawks
- Under 15 - Tomahawks
- Under 18 - Braves
- Under 20 - Renegades
- Ladies - Beacons

== Retired jerseys ==
Alfie Miller (#10) is the only jersey that has been retired for the Warriors.

== Logo ==
Despite the Warriors' logo depicting a Native American (the logo and colours being "inspired" by the Washington Redskins) and the associated controversy which resulted in the Redskins removing their logo on the grounds that it was considered racist, there has been no similar discussion around the Warriors'. Teams like Frölunda Indians HC and Chicago Blackhawks which have similar logos have come under significant pressure to change their logos on similar grounds. Frolunda announced that they would no longer be called the Indians and would be changing their logo.
