= Murrayfield Racers =

- City: Edinburgh, Scotland
- League: British League Premier
- Founded: 1952
- Operated: 1952–1996
- Home arena: Murrayfield Ice Rink; Capacity: 3800; Ice size: 200 ft x 97 ft
- Colours: Red, White, and Blue

Franchise history
- 1952–1958: Murrayfield Royals
- 1958–1966: Edinburgh Royals
- 1966–1994: Murrayfield Racers
- 1994–1995: Edinburgh Racers
- 1995–1996: Murrayfield Royals

The Murrayfield Racers were an ice hockey team based in Edinburgh, Scotland who were founded in 1952 as the Murrayfield Royals before changing their name to the Murrayfield Racers in 1966.

The team won the British Championship four times in four consecutive seasons from 1969 until 1972. The club was also the 1986–87 and 1987–88 British Ice Hockey League Champions and played in the BHL Premier Division from 1982 to 1995.

The Racers won the Northern League on seven occasions – in 1970, 1971, 1972, 1975, 1979, 1980 and 1980 and the Benson & Hedges Cup in 1993.

In the mid-90s the club became the Edinburgh Racers before folding due to financial issues in 1996.

The Murrayfield Racers brand was resurrected in 2018.
