= African immigrants to Sweden =

Africans in Sweden
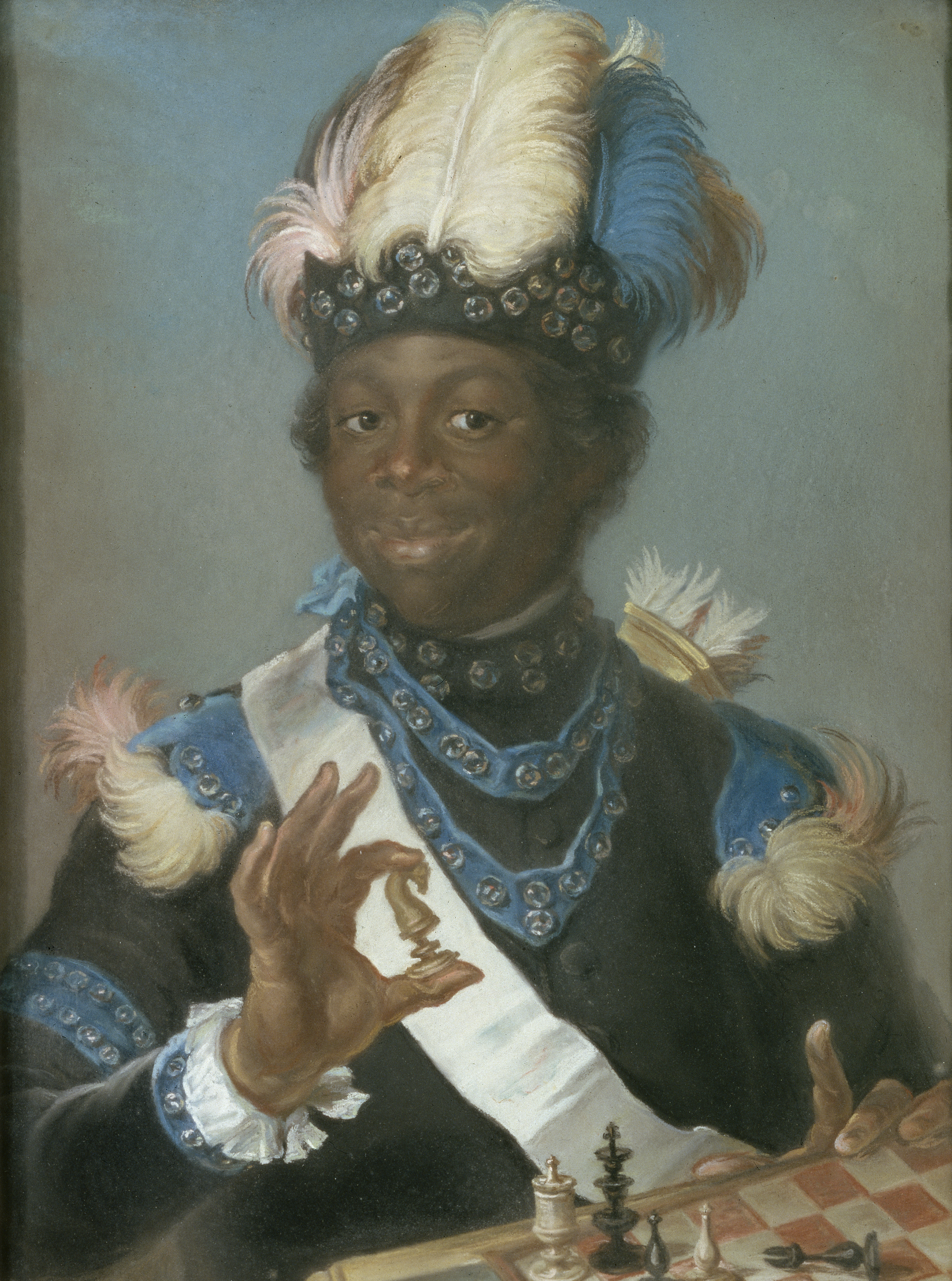
- Portrait of Gustav Badin (1775), an Afro-Swedish courtier and diarist by Gustaf Lundberg.

Total population
- 333,730 (2024)

Regions with significant populations
- Stockholm, Gothenburg, Malmö, Uppsala

Languages
- Swedish, languages of Africa (particularly Somali, Tigrinya, Amharic), English, French, Portuguese, Arabic, Telugu, Gujarati, German

Religion
- Christianity, Islam, Jainism, Hinduism

African immigrants to Sweden include naturalized citizens and residents of Sweden who were born in Africa. As of 2020, there are 236,975 people in Sweden who were born in Africa. By 2022, this number rose to 250,881 residents of Sweden who were born in Africa, or approximately 2.3% of the total population.

== History ==
African immigrants have been living in Sweden since the 17th century, but in very few numbers. In 1900, there were 79 Africans in Sweden, of which 5, all South Africans, were citizens. One of the early documented Africans in Sweden was Gustav Badin, (1747 or 1750 to 1822), a black court-servant and diarist, originally a slave but manumitted when he entered Sweden (slavery having been abolished since 1335), servant of Queen of Sweden, Louisa Ulrika and later Princess Sophia Albertine of Sweden. Badin was not the only African Swede during the 18th century. There were Black people in the royal regiments, one of them was the trumpeter Richard Abramsson who was born in the US. Most of the descendants of the African servants faced poverty in Sweden.

The 1970s, 1980s and 1990s saw increasing immigration from Africa, often as a consequence of civil wars. Swedish statistical data show that the African-born population has grown from 596 in 1960 to 4,149 in 1970, to 10,025 in 1980, 27,343 in 1990, 55,138 in 2000 and 103,077 in 2009. Abeba Aregawi become the first Swedish-Ethiopian Woman to win Gold in 1500m Athletics World Championship in Moscow 2013 and Bronze in 2012 Olympics in London

== Population size ==
Swedish national statistics collect data on country of birth, citizenship and parents' citizenship, but not on ethnicity or parents' country of birth. According to Statistics Sweden, as of 2016, there are 110,758 citizens of African nations residing in Sweden. Of these immigrants, the largest groups were born in Somalia (63,853), Eritrea (35,142), Ethiopia (17,944), Morocco (9,945), Egypt (6,807), Gambia (5,055), and Nigeria (5,027). Of these individuals, the largest groups were those holding citizenship from Somalia (41,335), Eritrea (32,099), Ethiopia (6,225), Nigeria (3,440), Egypt (3,359), Morocco (3,099), and Gambia (1,971).

== Adoption ==
Swedish families have been adopting children from Ethiopia since 1969. Between 1969 and 2005, 1,015 Ethiopian children found new parents in Sweden. The interest in adopting children from Africa has been increasing, with increases in the numbers of children adopted from South Africa, Kenya, Nigeria and Madagascar. News anchor Katarina Sandström, TV-comedian Marika Carlsson and restaurateur and celebrity chef Marcus Samuelsson are three well-known Swedes adopted from Ethiopia. Television sports journalist David Fjäll is another well-known Swedish person adopted from Africa.

== Notable people ==
The following list includes notable people in Sweden with recent ancestry from Africa, defined as those who:

- directly immigrated to Sweden from Africa, or
- have an ancestor who made such a migration.

This list does not include people of African descent who immigrated from a non-African country, or those whose only African ancestry stems from such immigration. For example, Swedes of African-American descent are not listed unless they also have at least one ancestor who directly immigrated from Africa to Sweden.

=== Politics ===
- Alice Bah Kuhnke (Minister of Culture and Democracy)
- Nyamko Sabuni (politician, former serving as Minister for Integration and Gender Equality in the Swedish government)
- Abdirizak Waberi, (Principal, politician and former member of parliament)
- Joe Frans (politician, board professional and former member of parliament.)
- Momodou Malcolm Jallow, (politician, activist and member of parliament)
- Mariam Osman Sherifay (politician, social activist, pre-school teacher and former member of parliament)
- Solange Olame Bayibsa (politician, member of parliament)

=== Television, film and theatre ===
- Malik Bendjelloul (Academy Award-winning documentary filmmaker)
- Mikael Marcimain (Film director)
- Othman Karim (Film director)
- David Fjäll (Television presenter and sports journalist)
- Katarina Sandström (Television news presenter and journalist)
- Pia Conde (Television news presenter and journalist)
- Ann-Sofie Gälman (Television news presenter and journalist)
- Thabo Motsieloa (Television news presenter)
- Marika Carlsson (TV personality and comedian)
- Kodjo Akolor (TV/radio personality and comedian)
- Peter Gardiner (Actor and ballet dancer)
- Yankho Kamwendo (Actor)
- Haddy Jallow (Actress)
- Josette Bushell-Mingo (Theatre actor and director)
- Ellen Nyman (actress, artist and theatre director)

=== Musicians ===
- Adiam (Rock vocalist)
- Dr. Alban (Rapper)
- Ecco2k (Designer, singer, rapper, director, music producer and photographer member of Drain Gang)
- Nadir Khayat aka RedOne (Songwriter and producer for Lady Gaga)
- Kayo Shekoni (Singer, TV personality and actress)
- Pauline Kamusewu (Singer)
- Gladys del Pilar (Singer and dancer)
- Jean-Louis Huhta (Musician, drummer, producer and DJ)
- Mohombi (Singer)
- Krister Linder (Singer, musician and soundtrack composer)
- Daniel Lemma (composer and singer)
- Addis Black Widow (Alternative hip hop group)
- Midi, Maxi & Efti (Singers)
- Mugambwa Sseruwagi (singer and actor)
- Neneh Cherry (Singer and rapper)
- Ken Ring
- Camilla Henemark (Singer, actress, political spokesperson and former fashion model)
- Gigi Hamilton (Singer-songwriter, best known as a member of the extremely popular Swedish pop-groups, Freestyle and later Style)
- Lars "Leari" Ljungberg (Member of the glam rock band The Ark)
- Timbuktu (Rapper)
- Loreen (singer)
- Jaqee (singer)
- Seinabo Sey (singer)
- Sabina Ddumba (singer)
- Namasenda (singer member of PC Music)
- Janice (singer)
- John Lundvik (singer)
- Tusse (singer)

=== Football players ===
- Jean-Paul Vonderburg
- Henrik Larsson (football manager, ex-Sweden captain and former player)
- Pascal Simpson
- Henok Goitom
- Jeffrey Aubynn
- Martin Olsson
- Marcus Olsson
- Eddie Gustafsson
- Yussuf Saleh
- Madelen Janogy
- Edward Ofere
- Martin Kayongo-Mutumba
- Daniel Nannskog
- Njogu Demba-Nyrén
- Benjamin Kibebe
- Amadou Jawo
- Omar Jawo
- José Monteiro de Macedo
- Kebba Ceesay
- Robin Quaison
- Noah Sonko Sundberg
- Saihou Jagne
- Antouman Jallow
- Marcus Andreasson
- Jones Kusi-Asare
- Patrick Amoah
- Jeffrey Aubynn
- Yosif Ayuba
- Rami Shaaban
- Bobbie Friberg da Cruz
- Johan Friberg da Cruz
- Joe Sise
- Christian Kouakou
- Serge-Junior Martinsson Ngouali
- Joseph Baffo
- Tobias Sana
- Samuel Adjei
- Carlos Strandberg
- Nabil Bahoui
- Modou Barrow
- Isak Ssewankambo
- Isaac Kiese Thelin
- Walid Atta
- Alexander Isak
- Mathias Ranégie
- Pa Konate
- Nabil Bahoui
- Ronald Mukiibi
- Ken Sema
- Niclas Eliasson
- Tesfaldet Tekie
- Ronald Mukiibi
- Mohammed Saeid

=== Other sports ===
- Yared Hagos (ice hockey player)
- Carl Gustafsson (ice hockey player)
- Johnny Oduya (ice hockey player)
- Fredrik Oduya (ice hockey player)
- Mark Owuya (ice hockey player)
- Oliver Kylington (ice hockey player)
- Badou Jack (boxer)
- Kennedy Katende (boxer)
- George Scott (boxer)
- Michel Tornéus (long jumper)
- Angelica Bengtsson (pole vaulter and youth world record holder)
- Maria Akraka (track and field athlete, TV-personality)
- Irene Ekelund (sprint)
- Abeba Aregawi (middle-distance runner)
- Meraf Bahta (middle-distance runner)
- Isabellah Andersson (long-distance runner)
- Alfred Shemweta (long-distance runner)
- Mustafa Mohamed (long-distance runner)
- Rizak Dirshe (long-distance runner)
- Nil de Oliveira (short-distance runner)
- Khaddi Sagnia (track and field athlete)
- Papy Abedi (mixed martial arts)
- Rudy Mbemba (basketball)
- Chioma Nnamaka (basketball)
- Christine Magnusson (badminton)
- Simon Sjödin (Olympic swimmer)
- Elias Ymer (tennis player)
- Mikael Ymer (tennis player)

=== Various ===
- Marcus Samuelsson (Restaurateur and TV chef)
- Nina Woodford (Songwriter)
- Pontus Carlsson (Chess player, became the country's 16th grandmaster)
- Blossom Tainton-Lindquist (Publisher, fitness coach and personal trainer)
- Ted Harris (Pastor)
- Buba Badjie (Veterinarian and entrepreneur)
- Johannes Anyuru (Poet and author)
- Cletus Nelson Nwadike (Poet and author)
- Jonas Hassen Khemiri (Author and novelist)
- Elena-Maria Smon Wolays (Night-club concept developer)
- Madubuko Diakité (Lawyer and academic)
- Daniel Adams-Ray (Fashion designer)
- Ida Ljungqvist (Model)
- Jean-Pierre Barda (Singer, TV-personality and make up artist)
- Sydney Onayemi aka Big Brother Sydney (DJ icon)
- Malou Hansson served as Miss Sweden in 2002, and the first black woman to win the crown.

== See also ==
- Racism in Sweden
