= 1999–2000 NHL transactions =

This list is for 1999–2000 NHL transactions within professional ice hockey league of players in North America. The following contains team-to-team transactions that occurred in the National Hockey League during the 1999–2000 NHL season. It lists what team each player has been traded to, or claimed by, and for which players or draft picks, if applicable.

== May ==
Date			References
May 3, 1999	To Nashville Predators future considerations	To New York Rangers Brad Smyth	
May 25, 1999	To Carolina Hurricanes 8th-rd pick - 1999 entry draft (# 237 - Antti Jokela)	To Philadelphia Flyers rights to Francis Lessard	
May 29, 1999	To Montreal Canadiens Trevor Linden	To New York Islanders 1st-rd pick - 1999 entry draft (# 10 - Branislav Mezei)	

== June ==
Date			References
June 18, 1999	To Vancouver Canucks rights to Pat Kavanagh	To Philadelphia Flyers 6th-rd pick - 1999 entry draft (# 160 - Konstantin Rudenko)	
June 18, 1999	To Atlanta Thrashers Damian Rhodes	To Ottawa Senators future considerations	
June 18, 1999	To Mighty Ducks of Anaheim Ted Donato rights to Antti-Jussi Niemi	To Ottawa Senators Patrick Lalime	
June 19, 1999	To Los Angeles Kings Marcel Cousineau; Zigmund Palffy; Bryan Smolinski; 4th-rd pick - 1999 entry draft (# 125 - Daniel Johansson)	To New York Islanders Mathieu Biron; Josh Green; Olli Jokinen; 1st-rd pick - 1999 entry draft (# 8 - Taylor Pyatt)	
June 21, 1999	To Nashville Predators conditional pick - 2000 entry draft (5th-rd - # 131 - Matt Hendricks)^{1}	To Atlanta Thrashers Andrew Brunette	
June 21, 1999	To Nashville Predators cash	To Washington Capitals rights to Jeff Nelson	
June 25, 1999	To Boston Bruins Peter Ferraro	To Atlanta Thrashers Randy Robitaille	
June 25, 1999	To Vancouver Canucks future considerations^{2}	To Atlanta Thrashers 4th-rd pick - 1999 entry draft (# 99 - Rob Zepp); 9th-rd pick - 1999 entry draft (# 246 - Ray DiLauro)	
June 25, 1999	To Phoenix Coyotes future considerations	To Atlanta Thrashers Scott Langkow	
June 25, 1999	To New Jersey Devils future considerations	To Atlanta Thrashers Sergei Vyshedkevich	
June 25, 1999	To Calgary Flames future considerations	To Atlanta Thrashers Andreas Karlsson	
June 25, 1999	To Florida Panthers Trevor Kidd	To Atlanta Thrashers Gord Murphy; Daniel Tjarnqvist; Herbert Vasiljevs; 6th-rd pick - 1999 entry draft (DAL - # 184 - Justin Cox)^{3}	
June 25, 1999	To Detroit Red Wings future considerations	To Atlanta Thrashers Ulf Samuelsson	
June 25, 1999	To Buffalo Sabres future considerations	To Atlanta Thrashers Dean Sylvester	
June 25, 1999	To Dallas Stars Warren Luhning	To New York Islanders 3rd-rd pick - 1999 entry draft (DAL - # 96 - Mathias Tjarnqvist)^{4}	
June 25, 1999	To Vancouver Canucks 1st-rd pick – 1999 entry draft (NYR - # 4 – Pavel Brendl)^{5}	To Chicago Blackhawks Bryan McCabe; Chicago's option of a 1st-rd pick – 2000 entry draft (# 11 – Pavel Vorobiev) or 2001 entry draft	
June 26, 1999	To Vancouver Canucks 1st-rd pick - 1999 entry draft (ATL - # 1 - Patrik Stefan)^{6}	To Tampa Bay Lightning 1st-rd pick – 1999 entry draft (NYR - # 4 – Pavel Brendl)^{7} 3rd-rd pick - 1999 entry draft (# 75 - Brett Scheffelmaier); 3rd-rd pick - 1999 entry draft (# 88 - Jimmi Olvestad)	
June 26, 1999	To Vancouver Canucks 1st-rd pick - 1999 entry draft (# 2 - Daniel Sedin) conditional 3rd-rd pick - 2000 entry draft^{8} (NJD - # 67 - Max Birbraer)^{9}	To Atlanta Thrashers 1st-rd pick - 1999 entry draft (# 1 - Patrik Stefan)	
June 26, 1999	To Tampa Bay Lightning Dan Cloutier; Niklas Sundstrom; 1st-rd pick - 2000 entry draft (# 8 - Nikita Alexeev); 3rd-rd pick – 2000 entry draft (CHI - # 74 – Igor Radulov)^{10}	To New York Rangers 1st-rd pick – 1999 entry draft (# 4 – Pavel Brendl)	
June 26, 1999	To Calgary Flames Marc Savard; 1st-rd pick - 1999 entry draft (# 11 - Oleg Saprykin)	To New York Rangers rights to Jan Hlavac; 1st-rd pick - 1999 entry draft (# 9 - Jamie Lundmark); 3rd-rd pick – 1999 entry draft (# 90 – Patrick Aufiero)	
June 26, 1999	To Phoenix Coyotes Travis Green; 1st-rd pick - 1999 entry draft (# 15 - Scott Kelman)	To Mighty Ducks of Anaheim Oleg Tverdovsky	
June 26, 1999	To Dallas Stars 2nd-rd pick - 1999 entry draft (# 32 - Michael Ryan); 3rd-rd pick - 1999 entry draft (# 96 - Mathias Tjarnqvist)	To New York Islanders 1st-rd pick - 1999 entry draft (# 28 - Kristian Kudroc)	
June 26, 1999	To Nashville Predators 2nd-rd pick - 1999 entry draft (COL - # 45 - Martin Grenier)^{11} 3rd-rd pick - 2000 entry draft (# 89 - Libor Pivko)	To Florida Panthers 2nd-rd pick - 1999 entry draft (# 40 - Alex Auld)	
June 26, 1999	To Mighty Ducks of Anaheim 2nd-rd pick - 1999 entry draft (# 44 - Jordan Leopold)	To Ottawa Senators 2nd-rd pick - 1999 entry draft (# 48 - Simon Lajeunesse); 7th-rd pick - 1999 entry draft (# 201 - Mikko Ruutu)	
June 26, 1999	To Nashville Predators 2nd-rd pick - 1999 entry draft (# 54 - Andrew Hutchinson); 2nd-rd pick - 1999 entry draft (# 61 - Ed Hill)	To Colorado Avalanche 2nd-rd pick - 1999 entry draft (# 45 - Martin Grenier); 3rd-rd pick - 1999 entry draft (# 93 - Branko Radivojevic)	
June 26, 1999	To Edmonton Oilers 3rd-rd pick - 1999 entry draft (# 91 - Mike Comrie)	To Nashville Predators Craig Millar	
June 26, 1999	To Nashville Predators 4th-rd pick - 1999 entry draft (# 121 - Evgeny Pavlov)	To Carolina Hurricanes Eric Fichaud	
June 26, 1999	To Florida Panthers rights to Jiri Dopita	To New York Islanders 5th-rd pick - 1999 entry draft (# 140 - Adam Johnson)	
June 26, 1999	To San Jose Sharks 5th-rd pick - 2000 entry draft (# 166 - Nolan Schaefer)	To Detroit Red Wings 5th-rd pick - 1999 entry draft (# 149 - Andrei Maximenko)	
June 26, 1999	To Montreal Canadiens Jim Cummins	To Phoenix Coyotes 6th-rd pick - 1999 entry draft (# 168 - Erik Lewerstrom)	
June 26, 1999	To San Jose Sharks 6th-rd pick - 2001 entry draft (# 182 - Tom Cavanagh)	To Vancouver Canucks 6th-rd pick - 1999 entry draft (# 172 - Josh Reed)	
June 26, 1999	To Dallas Stars 6th-rd pick - 1999 entry draft (# 184 - Justin Cox)	To Atlanta Thrashers Per Svartvadet	
June 26, 1999	To Chicago Blackhawks 7th-rd pick - 2000 entry draft (# 225 - Vladislav Luchkin)	To Washington Capitals 9th-rd pick - 1999 entry draft (# 249 - Igor Shadilov)	
June 26, 1999	To Florida Panthers 8th-rd pick - 2000 entry draft (# 234 - Janis Sprukts)	To New York Islanders 9th-rd pick - 1999 entry draft (# 255 - Brett Henning)	
June 26, 1999	To Colorado Avalanche 9th-rd pick - 2000 entry draft (# 266 - Sean Kotary)	To New York Islanders 9th-rd pick - 1999 entry draft (# 268 - Tyler Scott)	
June 26, 1999	To Nashville Predators Phil Crowe	To Atlanta Thrashers future considerations	
June 30, 1999	To Tampa Bay Lightning Andreas Johansson rights to sign Rick Dudley as General Manager	To Ottawa Senators Rob Zamuner; 2nd-rd pick - 2000 entry draft or 2001 entry draft or 2002 entry draft (DAL - # 34 - Tobias Stephan)^{12}	

1. Conditions of this draft pick are unknown.
2. Atlanta agreed to not select certain unspecified player(s) in the 1999 NHL expansion draft.
3. Atlanta's acquired sixth-round pick went to Dallas as the result of a trade on June 26, 1999 that sent Per Svartvadet to Atlanta in exchange for this pick.
4. Dallas' third-round pick was re-acquired as the result of a trade on June 26, 1999 that sent a first-round pick in the 1999 entry draft to the Islanders in exchange for a second-round pick in the 1999 entry draft and this pick.
5. Tampa Bay's acquired first-round pick went to the Rangers as the result of a trade on June 26, 1997 that sent Dan Cloutier, Niklas Sundstrom, a first-round pick and a third-round pick in the 2000 entry draft to Tampa Bay in exchange for this pick.
  Tampa Bay previously acquired this pick as the result of a trade on June 26, 1999 that sent a first-round pick (# 1 overall) in the 1999 entry draft in exchange for two third-round picks (# 75 & 88 overall) in the 1999 entry draft and this pick.
6. Vancouver's acquired first-round pick went to Atlanta as the result of a trade on June 26, 1997 that sent a first-round pick (# 2 overall) in the 1999 entry draft and a conditional third-round pick in the 2000 entry draft in exchange for this pick.
7. Tampa Bay's acquired first-round pick went to the Rangers as the result of a trade on June 26, 1997 that sent Dan Cloutier, Niklas Sundstrom, a first-round pick and a third-round pick in the 2000 entry draft to Tampa Bay in exchange for this pick.
8. Conditions of this draft pick are unknown.
9. Vancouver's acquired third-round pick went to New Jersey as the result of a trade on January 14, 2000 that sent Vadim Sharifijanov and a third-round pick in the 2000 Entry Draft to Vancouver in exchange for New Jersey's choice to get the second-round pick in the 2000 Entry Draft of Vancouver or the Islanders and New Jersey's choice to get the third-round pick in the 2000 Entry Draft of Atlanta or the Islanders (this pick).
10. San Jose's acquired third-round pick went to Chicago as the result of a trade on June 24, 2000 that sent a second-round pick (# 41 overall) in the 2000 Entry Draft to San Jose in exchange for a second-round pick (#49 overall) and this pick.
  Tampa Bay's acquired third-round pick went to San Jose as the result of a trade on August 4, 1999 that sent Shawn Burr, Steve Guolla, Bill Houlder and Andrei Zyuzin to Tampa Bay in exchange for Niklas Sundstrom and this pick.
11. Nashville's acquired second-round pick went to Colorado as the result of a trade on June 26, 1999 that sent two second-round picks (# 54 & 61 overall) in the 1999 Entry Draft to Nashville in exchange for a third-round pick in the 1999 Entry Draft and this pick.
12. Tampa Bay's acquired second-round pick went to Dallas as the result of a trade on June 22, 2002 that sent Brad Lukowich and a seventh-round pick in the 2003 entry draft to Tampa Bay in exchange for this pick.
  Tampa Bay previously acquired this pick as the result of a trade on June 21, 2002 that sent a first-round pick (# 4 overall) in the 2002 Entry Draft to Philadelphia in exchange for Ruslan Fedotenko, a second-round pick (# 52 overall) in the 2002 Entry Draft and this pick.
  Philadelphia previously acquired this pick as the result of a trade on June 23, 2001 that sent a first-round pick (# 23 overall) in the 2001 entry draft to Ottawa in exchange for a first-round pick (# 27 overall) and a seventh-round compensatory pick in the 2001 entry draft along with this pick.

== July ==
Date			References
July 15, 1999	To Toronto Maple Leafs 6th-rd pick - 2001 entry draft (# 168 - Maxim Kondratiev)	To Atlanta Thrashers Martin Prochazka	
July 15, 1999	To Dallas Stars Jamie Pushor	To Atlanta Thrashers Jason Botterill cash	
July 16, 1999	To Colorado Avalanche future considerations	To Washington Capitals Craig Billington	
July 21, 1999	To San Jose Sharks Eric Landry	To Calgary Flames Fredrik Oduya	

== August ==
Date			References
August 4, 1999	To San Jose Sharks Niklas Sundstrom; 3rd-rd pick - 2000 entry draft (CHI - # 74 - Igor Radulov)^{1}	To Tampa Bay Lightning Shawn Burr; Steve Guolla; Bill Houlder; Andrei Zyuzin	
August 5, 1999	To Toronto Maple Leafs 9th-rd pick - 2000 entry draft (# 265 - Jean-Philippe Cote)	To Tampa Bay Lightning Jeff Reese; 9th-rd pick - 2000 entry draft (PHI - # 287 - Milan Kopecky)^{2}	
August 16, 1999	To Nashville Predators rights to Randy Robitaille	To Atlanta Thrashers Denny Lambert	
August 17, 1999	To Toronto Maple Leafs Craig Charron	To New York Islanders Niklas Andersson	
August 18, 1999	To Calgary Flames Benoit Gratton	To Washington Capitals Steve Shirreffs	
August 23, 1999	To San Jose Sharks 5th-rd pick - 2000 entry draft (# 142 - Michal Pinc)	To Chicago Blackhawks Michel Larocque	

1. San Jose's acquired third-round pick went to Chicago as the result of a trade on June 24, 2000, that sent a second-round pick (# 41 overall) in the 2000 entry draft to San Jose in exchange for a second-round pick (#49 overall) and this pick.
2. Tampa Bay's acquired ninth-round pick went to Philadelphia as the result of a trade on June 25, 2000, that sent a fourth-round pick in the 2000 entry draft to Tampa Bay in exchange for sixth and seventh-round picks in the 2000 entry draft along with this pick.

== September ==
Date			References
September 4, 1999	To Calgary Flames Grant Fuhr	To St. Louis Blues 3rd-rd pick - 2000 entry draft (# 75 - Justin Papineau)	
September 11, 1999	To Phoenix Coyotes Craig Mills	To Chicago Blackhawks cash	
September 27, 1999	To Mighty Ducks of Anaheim Ladislav Kohn	To Atlanta Thrashers 8th-rd pick - 2000 entry draft (# 242 - Evan Nielsen)	
August 27, 1999	To Nashville Predators Paul Healey	To Philadelphia Flyers Matt Henderson	
September 30, 1999	To Pittsburgh Penguins Peter Popovic	To New York Rangers Kevin Hatcher	
September 30, 1999	To Calgary Flames Bill Lindsay	To Florida Panthers Todd Simpson	

== October ==
Date			References
October 1, 1999	To Toronto Maple Leafs Cory Cross; 7th-rd pick - 2001 entry draft (# 198 - Ivan Kolozvary)	To Tampa Bay Lightning Fredrik Modin	
October 3, 1999	To Tampa Bay Lightning future considerations	To New York Rangers Alexandre Daigle	
October 5, 1999	To New Jersey Devils Ken Sutton	To Washington Capitals future considerations	
October 7, 1999	To New Jersey Devils Steve Kelly	To Tampa Bay Lightning 7th-rd pick - 2000 entry draft (# 226 - Brian Eklund)	
October 8, 1999	To Toronto Maple Leafs 2nd-rd pick - 2001 entry draft (# 39 - Karel Pilar)	To Chicago Blackhawks Sylvain Cote	
October 15, 1999	To Atlanta Thrashers cash	To Philadelphia Flyers Jody Hull	
October 20, 1999	To Toronto Maple Leafs Tyler Harlton future considerations	To St. Louis Blues Derek King	
October 20, 1999	To Toronto Maple Leafs right to match arbitration award of Dmitri Khristich	To Boston Bruins 2nd-rd pick - 2000 entry draft (# 59 - Ivan Huml)	
October 20, 1999	To Montreal Canadiens Karl Dykhuis	To Philadelphia Flyers future considerations	
October 29, 1999	To Vancouver Canucks Corey Schwab	To Atlanta Thrashers conditional pick - 2000 entry draft (4th-rd - # 107 - Carl Mallette)^{1}	
October 29, 1999	To Tampa Bay Lightning future considerations	To Atlanta Thrashers Mikko Kuparinen	
October 29, 1999	To Mighty Ducks of Anaheim Tony Hrkac; Dean Malkoc	To New York Islanders Ted Drury	

1. Conditions of this draft pick are unknown.

== November ==
Date			References
November 1, 1999	To New Jersey Devils Sylvain Cloutier; Jeff Williams; 7th-rd pick - 2000 entry draft (# 198 - Ken Magowan)	To Atlanta Thrashers Eric Bertrand; Wes Mason	
November 3, 1999	To New Jersey Devils Claude Lemieux conditional pick - 2000 entry draft (2nd-rd - # 57 - Matt DeMarchi)^{1} New Jersey's option to swap 1st-rd picks – 2000 entry draft (# 22 - David Hale)	To Colorado Avalanche Brian Rolston; New Jersey's option to swap 1st-rd picks – 2000 entry draft (BOS - # 27 - Martin Samuelsson)^{2}	
November 11, 1999	To Tampa Bay Lightning Bruce Gardiner	To Ottawa Senators Colin Forbes	
November 12, 1999	To Chicago Blackhawks Michael Nylander	To Tampa Bay Lightning Bryan Muir; Reid Simpson	
November 13, 1999	To Calgary Flames Andreas Johansson	To Tampa Bay Lightning rights to Nils Ekman; 4th-rd pick – 2000 entry draft (NYI - # 105 - Vladimir Gorbunov)^{3}	
November 16, 1999	To Nashville Predators conditional pick - 2001 entry draft^{4}	To Philadelphia Flyers Steve Washburn	
November 18, 1999	To Phoenix Coyotes Sean Burke; 5th-rd picks – 2000 entry draft (# 160 - Nate Kiser)	To Florida Panthers Mikhail Shtalenkov; 4th-rd pick – 2000 entry draft (# 115 - Chris Eade)	
November 26, 1999	To Montreal Canadiens Mike McBain	To Tampa Bay Lightning Gordie Dwyer	
November 29, 1999	To Toronto Maple Leafs 3rd-rd pick - 2000 entry draft (# 70 - Mikael Tellqvist)	To Tampa Bay Lightning Todd Warriner	
November 30, 1999	To Phoenix Coyotes Eric Houde	To Edmonton Oilers Rob Murray	

1. Conditions of this draft pick are unknown.
2. Colorado's acquired first-round pick went to Boston as the result of a trade on March 6, 2000, that sent Dave Andreychuk and Ray Bourque to Colorado in exchange for Martin Grenier, Samuel Pahlsson, Brian Rolston and a Boston option of a first-round pick in the 2000 entry draft (this pick) or 2001 entry draft.
3. Tampa Bay's acquired fourth-round pick went to the Islanders as the result of a trade on June 24, 2000 that sent Kevin Weekes, the rights to Kristian Kudroc and a second-round pick in the 2001 entry draft to Tampa Bay in exchange for a first and seven-round picks in the 2000 Entry Draft along with this pick.
4. Conditions of this draft pick are unknown. Nashville did not select a pick from this trade.

== December ==
Date			References
December 8, 1999	To Colorado Avalanche Rick Tabaracci	To Atlanta Thrashers Shean Donovan	
December 9, 1999	To Atlanta Thrashers Brian Wesenberg	To Philadelphia Flyers Eric Bertrand	
December 15, 1999	To Dallas Stars Kevin Dean	To Atlanta Thrashers 9th-rd pick – 2000 entry draft (# 105 - Mark McRae)	
December 19, 1999	To Vancouver Canucks Felix Potvin; 2nd-rd pick – 2000 entry draft (NJD - # 39 - Teemu Laine)^{1} 3rd-rd conditional pick – 2000 entry draft (# 71 - Thatcher Bell)^{2}	To New York Islanders Bill Muckalt; Dave Scatchard; Kevin Weekes	
December 29, 1999	To Boston Bruins Mike Matteucci	To Edmonton Oilers Kay Whitmore	
December 30, 1999	To San Jose Sharks Radek Dvorak	To Florida Panthers Mike Vernon; 3rd-rd pick – 2000 entry draft (# 82 - Sean O'Connor)	
December 30, 1999	To San Jose Sharks Todd Harvey; 4th-rd picks – 2001 entry draft (# 107 - Dimitri Patzold)	To New York Rangers Radek Dvorak	

1. Vancouver's acquired second-round pick went to New Jersey as the result of a trade on January 14, 2000 that sent Vadim Sharifijanov and a third-round pick in the 2000 entry draft to Vancouver in exchange for New Jersey's choice to get the second-round pick in the 2000 entry draft of Vancouver or the Islanders (this pick) and New Jersey's choice to get the third-round pick in the 2000 entry draft of Atlanta or the Islanders.
2. Conditions of this draft pick are unknown.

== January ==
Date			References
January 13, 2000	To St. Louis Blues Stephane Richer	To Tampa Bay Lightning Chris McAlpine; Rich Parent	
January 14, 2000	To New Jersey Devils New Jersey's choice to get 2nd-rd pick – 2000 entry draft of Vancouver or the Islanders (# 39 - Teemu Laine); New Jersey's choice to get 3rd-rd pick – 2000 entry draft of Atlanta or the Islanders (# 67 - Max Birbraer)	To Vancouver Canucks Vadim Sharifijanov; 3rd-rd pick - 2000 entry draft (# 93 - Tim Branham)	
January 17, 2000	To Washington Capitals 7th-rd pick - 2000 entry draft (LAK - # 201 - Yevgeny Fyodorov)^{1} 3rd-rd pick - 2001 entry draft (TOR - # 65 - Brendan Bell)^{2}	To Tampa Bay Lightning Jaroslav Svejkovsky	
January 22, 2000	To Montreal Canadiens Juha Lind	To Dallas Stars Scott Thornton	
January 23, 2000	To Buffalo Sabres Vladimir Tsyplakov conditional 8th-rd pick - 2001 entry draft (# 247 - Marek Dubec)^{3}	To Los Angeles Kings 8th-rd pick - 2000 entry draft (# 245 - Daniel Welch) conditional 6th-rd pick - 2001 entry draft (TBL - # 188 - Art Femenella)^{3},^{4} conditional pick - 2001 entry draft^{5}	
January 23, 2000	To Carolina Hurricanes Rod Brind'Amour; Jean-Marc Pelletier; 2nd-rd pick - 2000 entry draft (COL - # 63 - Agris Saviels)^{6}	To Philadelphia Flyers Keith Primeau; 5th-rd pick - 2000 entry draft (TBL - # 148 - Kristofer Ottosson)^{7}	
January 25, 2000	To Los Angeles Kings future considerations	To Atlanta Thrashers Bill Huard	
January 26, 2000	To Chicago Blackhawks conditional pick - 2001 entry draft^{8}	To Philadelphia Flyers Todd White	
January 29, 2000	To Mighty Ducks of Anaheim Kip Miller	To Pittsburgh Penguins 9th-rd pick - 2000 entry draft (# 273 - Roman Simicek)	

1. Washington's acquired seventh-round pick went to Los Angeles as the result of a trade on June 25, 2000 that sent a fifth-round pick in the 2000 entry draft to Washington in exchange for a seventh-round pick (# 206 overall) in the 2000 entry draft and this pick.
2. Washington's acquired third-round pick went to Toronto as the result of a trade on December 11, 2000, that sent Dmitri Khristich to Washington in exchange for this pick.
3. Condition of these draft picks was if Vladimir Tsyplakov re-signed with Buffalo after the 2000 entry draft.
4. Los Angeles' acquired sixth-round pick went to Tampa Bay as the result of a trade on June 24, 2001 that sent a fifth-round pick in the 2001 entry draft to Los Angeles in exchange for two sixth-round picks (# 184 overall and this pick) in the 2001 entry draft.
5. Condition of these draft picks was if Vladimir Tsyplakov signed with Buffalo after the 2000 entry draft.
6. This pick would have been a conditional compensatory pick if one is awarded to Buffalo if Buffalo did not re-sign Vladimir Tsyplakov.
7. Carolina's acquired second-round pick went to Colorado as the result of a trade on June 24, 2000 that sent Sandis Ozolinsh and a second-round pick (# 32 overall) in the 2000 Entry Draft to Carolina in exchange for Nolan Pratt, a first-round and second-round (# 47 overall) picks in the 2000 Entry Draft and this pick.
8. Philadelphia's acquired fifth-round pick went to the Islanders as the result of a trade on February 15, 2000 that Gino Odjick to Philadelphia in exchange for Mikael Andersson and this pick.
9. Condition of this draft pick is unknown. Chicago did not select a pick from this trade.

== February ==
Date			References
February 2, 2000	To Nashville Predators Evgeny Namestnikov	To New York Rangers Jason Dawe	
February 2, 2000	To Nashville Predators Stewart Malgunas	To Washington Capitals conditional pick - 2001 entry draft^{1}	
February 4, 2000	To Edmonton Oilers Alexandre Volchkov	To Washington Capitals 4th-rd pick - 2001 entry draft (ANA - # 118 - Brandon Rogers)^{2}	
February 8, 2000	To Dallas Stars Sylvain Cote; Dave Manson	To Chicago Blackhawks Kevin Dean; Derek Plante; 2nd-rd pick - 2001 entry draft (# 59 - Matt Keith)	
February 9, 2000	To St. Louis Blues Dan Keczmer	To Nashville Predators Rory Fitzpatrick	
February 9, 2000	To Toronto Maple Leafs Darcy Tucker; 4th-rd pick - 2000 entry draft (# 100 - Miguel Delisle); Toronto's option to swap 5th-rd picks – 2001 entry draft (# 134 – Kyle Wellwood)	To Tampa Bay Lightning Mike Johnson; Marek Posmyk; 5th-rd pick - 2000 entry draft (# 161 - Pavel Sedov); 6th-rd pick - 2000 entry draft (# 191 - Aaron Gionet); Toronto's option to swap 5th-rd picks – 2001 entry draft (LAK - # 152 - Terry Denike)^{3}	
February 11, 2000	To Calgary Flames Jason Botterill; Darryl Shannon	To Atlanta Thrashers Hnat Domenichelli rights to Dmitri Vlasenkov	
February 14, 2000	To Nashville Predators Eric Bertrand	To Philadelphia Flyers future considerations	
February 15, 2000	To Philadelphia Flyers Gino Odjick	To New York Islanders Mikael Andersson; 5th-rd pick - 2000 entry draft (# 148 - Kristofer Ottosson)	
February 18, 2000	To Calgary Flames future considerations	To Atlanta Thrashers Joel Irving	
February 18, 2000	To Los Angeles Kings Allan Egeland	To Calgary Flames future considerations	
February 21, 2000	To Boston Bruins Eric Weinrich	To Montreal Canadiens Patrick Traverse	
February 23, 2000	To Toronto Maple Leafs Donald MacLean	To Los Angeles Kings Craig Charron	

1. Conditions of this draft pick are unknown. Washington did not select a pick from this trade.
2. Washington's acquired fourth-round pick went to Anaheim as the result of a trade on March 13, 2001, that sent Jason Marshall to Washington in exchange for Alexei Tezikov and this pick.
3. Tampa Bay's acquired fifth-round pick went to Los Angeles as the result of a trade on June 24, 2001, that sent two sixth-round picks (# 184 & 188 overall) in the 2001 entry draft to Tampa Bay in exchange for this pick.

== March ==
- Trading Deadline: March 14, 2000

Date			References
March 1, 2000	To New Jersey Devils Vladimir Malakhov	To Montreal Canadiens Josh DeWolf; Sheldon Souray; 2nd-rd pick - 2001 entry draft (TBL - # 61 - Andreas Holmqvist)^{1}	
March 3, 2000	To Chicago Blackhawks Dallas Eakins	To New York Islanders future considerations	
March 6, 2000	To Calgary Flames Marc Bureau	To Philadelphia Flyers Travis Brigley; 6th-rd pick - 2001 entry draft (# 177 - Andrei Razin)	
March 6, 2000	To Boston Bruins Martin Grenier; Samuel Pahlsson; Brian Rolston; Boston's option of a 1st-rd pick – 2000 entry draft (# 27 – Martin Samuelsson) or 2001 entry draft	To Colorado Avalanche Dave Andreychuk; Ray Bourque	
March 7, 2000	To New Jersey Devils Deron Quint; 3rd-rd pick - 2001 entry draft (PHO - # 78 - Beat Forster)^{2}	To Phoenix Coyotes Lyle Odelein	
March 8, 2000	To Tampa Bay Lightning future considerations	To Ottawa Senators Jeff Shevalier	
March 8, 2000	To Phoenix Coyotes Mikael Renberg	To Philadelphia Flyers Rick Tocchet	
March 9, 2000	To Buffalo Sabres Chris Gratton; 2nd-rd pick – 2001 entry draft (# 32 – Derek Roy)	To Tampa Bay Lightning Brian Holzinger; Wayne Primeau; Cory Sarich; 3rd-rd pick – 2000 entry draft (# 81 – Alexander Kharitonov)	
March 9, 2000	To Montreal Canadiens Matthieu Descoteaux; Christian Laflamme	To Edmonton Oilers Alain Nasreddine; Igor Ulanov	
March 9, 2000	To Tampa Bay Lightning 7th-rd pick - 2000 entry draft (NYI - # 202 - Ryan Caldwell)^{3}	To New York Islanders Ian Herbers	
March 10, 2000	To Buffalo Sabres Jean-Pierre Dumont; Doug Gilmour	To Chicago Blackhawks Michal Grosek	
March 10, 2000	To Boston Bruins Mike Knuble	To New York Rangers Rob DiMaio	
March 11, 2000	To Tampa Bay Lightning Mikko Kuparinen	To Atlanta Thrashers Chris McAlpine	
March 11, 2000	To Mighty Ducks of Anaheim Jorgen Jonsson	To New York Islanders Johan Davidsson conditional pick - 2001 entry draft^{4}	
March 13, 2000	To Los Angeles Kings Kelly Buchberger; Nelson Emerson	To Atlanta Thrashers Donald Audette; Frantisek Kaberle	
March 13, 2000	To Phoenix Coyotes Philippe Audet	To Detroit Red Wings Todd Gill	
March 13, 2000	To Florida Panthers future considerations	To New York Rangers Chris Wells	
March 13, 2000	To Nashville Predators Pavel Skrbek	To Pittsburgh Penguins Bob Boughner	
March 14, 2000	To Atlanta Thrashers 6th-rd pick – 2000 entry draft (# 178 – Jeff Dwyer); 6th-rd pick – 2001 entry draft (# 189 – Pasi Nurminen)	To Philadelphia Flyers Kirby Law	
March 14, 2000	To Mighty Ducks of Anaheim Ed Ward	To Atlanta Thrashers 7th-rd pick – 2001 entry draft (# 201 – Colin FitzRandolph)	
March 14, 2000	To Pittsburgh Penguins Janne Laukkanen; Ron Tugnutt	To Ottawa Senators Tom Barrasso	
March 14, 2000	To Calgary Flames Sergei Krivokrasov	To Nashville Predators Cale Hulse; 3rd-rd pick - 2001 entry draft (# 75 - Denis Platonov)	
March 14, 2000	To Nashville Predators Petr Sachl	To New York Islanders 9th-rd pick - 2000 entry draft (# 267 - Tomi Pettinen)	
March 14, 2000	To Mighty Ducks of Anaheim Corey Hirsch	To Nashville Predators future considerations	
March 14, 2000	To Calgary Flames Brad Werenka	To Pittsburgh Penguins Rene Corbet; Tyler Moss	
March 14, 2000	To Mighty Ducks of Anaheim 5th-rd pick – 2000 entry draft (# 153 – Bill Cass)	To Pittsburgh Penguins Dan Trebil	
March 14, 2000	To Edmonton Oilers German Titov	To Pittsburgh Penguins Josef Beranek	
March 14, 2000	To Tampa Bay Lightning Dwayne Hay; Ryan Johnson	To Florida Panthers Mike Sillinger	
March 14, 2000	To Carolina Hurricanes Sandy McCarthy	To Philadelphia Flyers Kent Manderville	
March 14, 2000	To New Jersey Devils Alexander Mogilny	To Vancouver Canucks Brendan Morrison; Denis Pederson	
March 16, 2000	To Calgary Flames Filip Kuba	To Florida Panthers Rocky Thompson	

1. Washington's acquired second-round pick went to Tampa Bay as the result of a trade on June 23, 2001 that sent a second-round pick in the 2002 entry draft to Washington in exchange for this pick.
  Washington previously acquired this pick as the result of a trade on March 13, 2001 that sent Jan Bulis, Richard Zednik and a first-round pick in the 2001 entry draft to Montreal in exchange for Trevor Linden, Dainius Zubrus and this pick.
2. Phoenix's third-round pick was re-acquired as the result of a trade on June 23, 2001 that sent a fourth-round pick in the 2001 entry draft and a third-round pick in the 2002 entry draft to New Jersey in exchange for this pick.
3. The Islanders' re-acquired this pick as the result of a trade on June 24, 2000 that sent Kevin Weekes, the rights to Kristian Kudroc and a second-round pick in the 2001 entry draft to Tampa Bay in exchange for a first and fourth-round picks in the 2000 entry draft along with this pick.
4. The condition of this draft pick was if Anaheim re-signed Jorgen Jonsson. The condition was not met when Jonsson sign a contract with Färjestad BK of the Swedish Hockey League.

== See also ==
- 1999 NHL entry draft
- 1999 in sports
- 2000 in sports
