= Kamwendo =

Kamwendo is a surname. Notable people with the surname include:

- Joseph Kamwendo (born 1986), Malawian footballer and coach
- Steven Kamwendo (born 1966), Malawian politician
- Yankho Kamwendo (born 1978), Swedish TV personality and actor
