= Nwadike =

Surname list

- Pronunciation: Nwá-dike

Origin
- Language: Igbo
- Origin: Igboland
- Meaning: Child of a hero

Nwadike is a surname and a given name of Igbo origin. The name means “The child of a warrior”.

== Sport ==
- Brian Nwadike (born 7 July 2005), Japanese footballer
- Patrick Nwadike (born 29 August 1998), Swedish footballer
- Raphael Onyedika Nwadike (born 19 April 2001), Nigerian footballer
- Emeka Nwadike (born 9 August 1978), English footballer
- Rita Nwadike (born 3 November 1974), Nigerian footballer

== Other ==
- Ken Nwadike Jr. (born 29 December 1981), American documentary filmmaker, speaker, and activist
- Collete Nwadike (born 6 April 1991), Nigerian model
- Cletus Nelson Nwadike (born 1966), Swedish-Nigerian poet and author.
