= Galman =

Galman may refer to:

- Ann-Sofie Gälman, Swedish television presenter and journalist
- Rolando Galman, alleged hitman of Benigno Aquino Jr.
- Galman Empire, a fictional empire in Space Battleship Yamato
