= David Fjäll =

Swedish television presenter and journalist

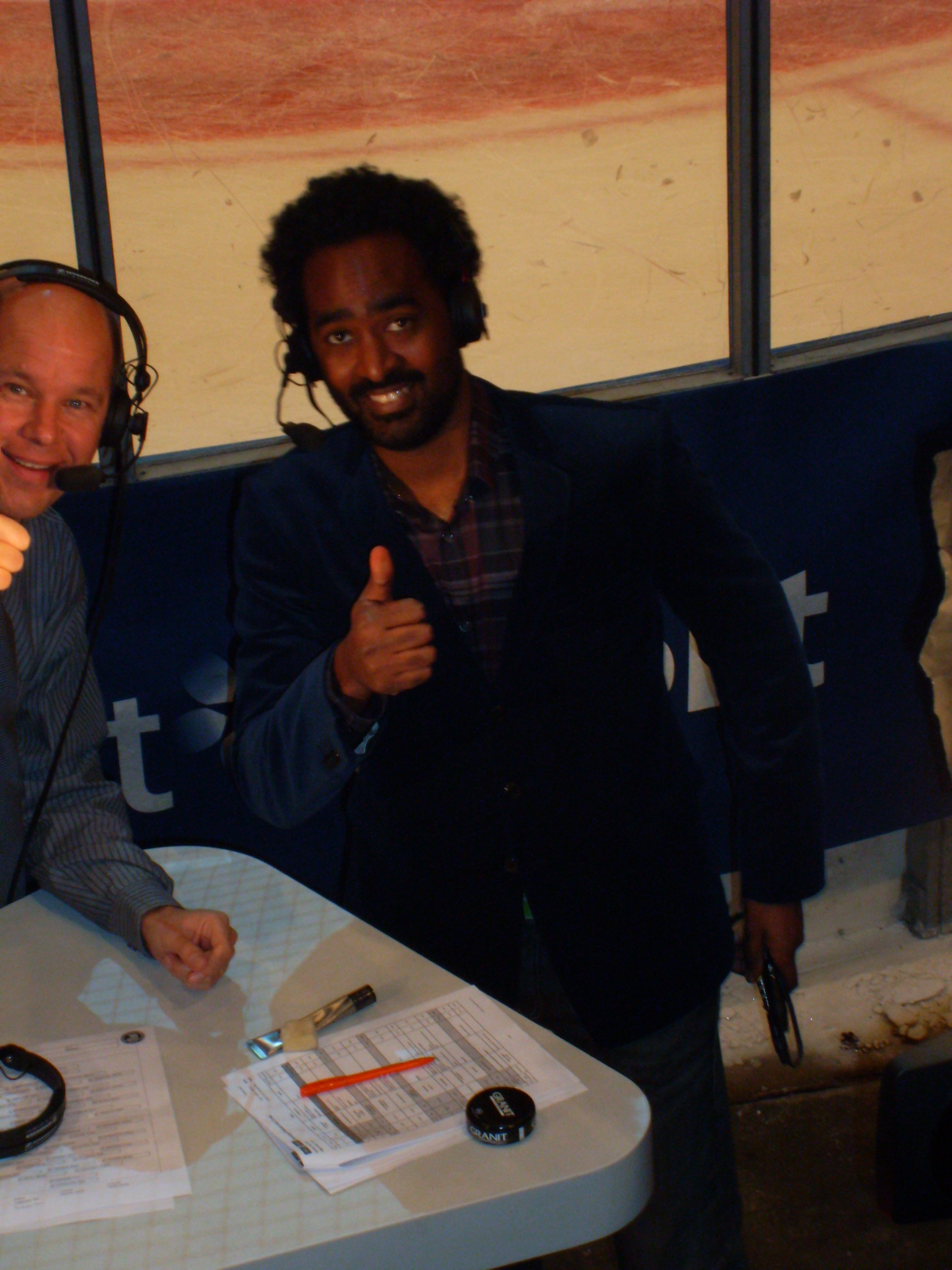
David Fjäll

Carl Johan Dawid "David" Fjäll is a Swedish television presenter and sports journalist working for SVT.

Born in Eritrea, at the time of the Ethiopian Empire (just days before Haile Selassie was deposed by the Derg), Fjäll was adopted to Sweden when he was four months old and grew up in Sigtuna. He started his career at King, an advertising agency in London. He began his television career at channel MediTV and later Fan TV. He significantly raised his profile in 2006 with football fans as the presenter for web-TV programs Eurotalk and Matchpuls at svenskafans.com.

He was recruited to SVT for the 2007–08 hockey season, as the show host for the Euro Hockey Tour coverage. Since then he has been show host of Tre Kronor Live, a show focusing on the Sweden men's national ice hockey team and a Monday night football magazine for the same channel. He has also worked for Norwegian channel NRK as an Ice hockey commentator during the 2010 Olympic Games. Outside of football and ice hockey, he has worked as a reporter covering cross-country skiing competition Vasaloppet in 2009.

He was a reporter during the 2009 Confederations Cup in South Africa. Fjäll also has a hosted a football show on SVT's website which premiered 10 October 2009. In autumn 2009, he began to lead weekly children's sports program Lilla Sportspegeln. During the winter of 2009/2010, he was hosting the broadcasts from the Hockey Junior World Cup of at SVT24. In July 2010 he began hosting SVT's football show Fotbollskväll.
