= Niklas Sundström =

Swedish ice hockey player

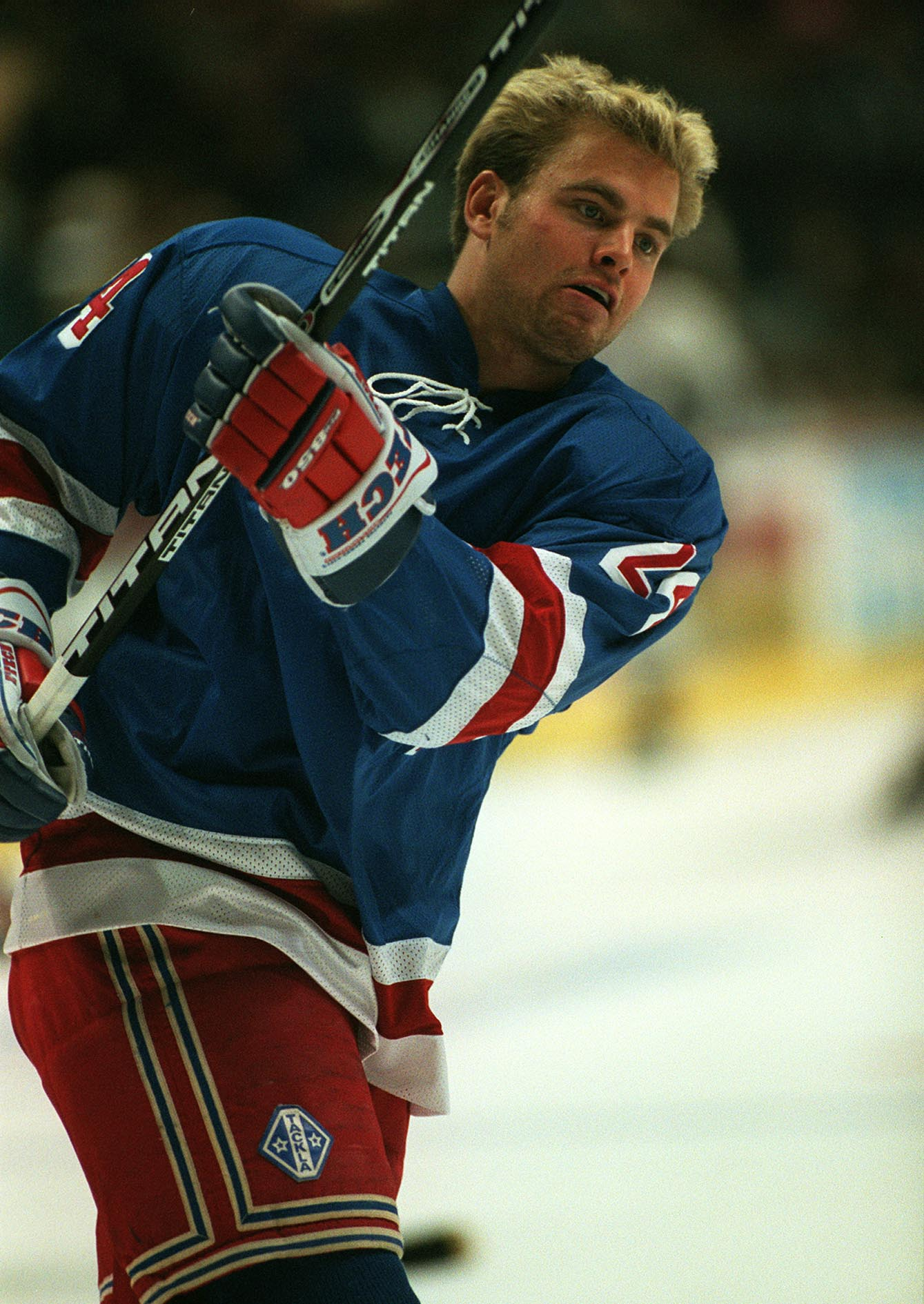
- Niklas Sundström playing for the New York Rangers against the Vancouver Canucks in October 1997
- Born: 6 June 1975 (age 51) Örnsköldsvik, Sweden
- Height: 6 ft 0 in (183 cm)
- Weight: 191 lb (87 kg; 13 st 9 lb)
- Position: Right wing
- Shot: Left
- Played for: Modo Hockey; New York Rangers; San Jose Sharks; Montreal Canadiens; HC Milano Vipers
- National team: Sweden
- NHL draft: 8th overall, 1993; New York Rangers
- Playing career: 1991–2013

Lars Niklas Sundström (born 6 June 1975) is a Swedish former professional ice hockey player who started his professional career in Modo Hockey.

== Career ==
He was drafted eighth overall in the 1993 NHL entry draft by the New York Rangers. He was also on Wayne Gretzky's line. He was not known for his goal scoring ability, but for his defensive play. He was traded to the San Jose Sharks in 1999, and to the Montreal Canadiens in 2003. Sundström plays forward and specializes in defensive roles. When he was a junior player he formed a line in Modo with future NHL stars Peter Forsberg and Markus Näslund. He wore the number 24 for the San Jose Sharks and the New York Rangers but wore the number 37 for the Montreal Canadiens. After 11 NHL seasons, he returned to play in Sweden at the start of the 2006–07 season, leading Modo to a surprise title during his first season, scoring several vital goals in the playoffs. He formed an effective partnership with Norwegian Per-Åge Skrøder, leading to Skrøder winning the top scorer rankings in 2009. Modo still missed the playoffs that year, despite Sundström having the best plus-minus rating in the entire series. On 3 December 2013 Sundström officially announced his retirement.

== Personal life ==
Sundström's son, Milan, is a top prospect eligible for the 2027 NHL entry draft.

== Career statistics ==
=== Regular season and playoffs ===
			Regular season					Playoffs
Season	Team	League	GP	G	A	Pts	PIM	GP	G	A	Pts	PIM
1991–92	Modo Hockey	SEL	9	1	3	4	0	—	—	—	—	—
1992–93	Modo Hockey	SEL	39	7	11	18	18	3	0	0	0	0
1992–93	Modo Hockey	SWE U20	2	3	1	4	0	—	—	—	—	—
1993–94	Modo Hockey	SEL	37	7	12	19	28	11	4	3	7	2
1993–94	Modo Hockey	SWE U20	3	3	4	7	2	—	—	—	—	—
1994–95	Modo Hockey	SEL	33	8	13	21	30	—	—	—	—	—
1995–96	New York Rangers	NHL	82	9	12	21	14	11	4	3	7	4
1996–97	New York Rangers	NHL	82	24	28	52	20	9	0	5	5	2
1997–98	New York Rangers	NHL	70	19	28	47	24	—	—	—	—	—
1998–99	New York Rangers	NHL	81	13	30	43	20	—	—	—	—	—
1999–2000	San Jose Sharks	NHL	79	12	25	37	22	12	0	2	2	2
2000–01	San Jose Sharks	NHL	82	10	39	49	28	6	0	3	3	2
2001–02	San Jose Sharks	NHL	73	9	30	39	50	12	1	6	7	6
2002–03	San Jose Sharks	NHL	47	2	10	12	22	—	—	—	—	—
2002–03	Montreal Canadiens	NHL	33	5	9	14	8	—	—	—	—	—
2003–04	Montreal Canadiens	NHL	66	8	12	20	18	4	1	0	1	2
2004–05	HC Milano Vipers	ITA	33	9	30	39	40	15	4	14	18	22
2005–06	Montreal Canadiens	NHL	55	6	9	15	30	5	0	3	3	4
2006–07	Modo Hockey	SEL	47	9	36	45	116	20	5	8	13	26
2007–08	Modo Hockey	SEL	45	7	30	37	128	5	0	6	6	14
2008–09	Modo Hockey	SEL	49	18	35	53	70	—	—	—	—	—
2009–10	Modo Hockey	SEL	32	5	15	20	28	—	—	—	—	—
2010–11	Modo Hockey	SEL	53	11	22	33	40	—	—	—	—	—
2011–12	Modo Hockey	SEL	50	11	26	37	42	6	1	1	2	0
2012–13	Modo Hockey	SEL	46	9	14	23	34	5	2	1	3	4
SEL totals			441	93	217	310	534	50	12	19	31	46
NHL totals			750	117	232	349	256	59	6	22	28	22

=== International ===
Year	Team	Event	GP	G	A	Pts	PIM
1992	Sweden	EJC	6	1	0	1	6
1993	Sweden	EJC	6	4	9	13	10
1993	Sweden	WJC	7	10	4	14	0
1994	Sweden	WJC	7	4	7	11	10
1995	Sweden	WJC	7	4	4	8	4
1996	Sweden	WCH	4	2	2	4	0
1998	Sweden	OG	4	1	1	2	2
1998	Sweden	WC	10	1	5	6	8
1999	Sweden	WC	8	5	2	7	4
2002	Sweden	OG	4	1	3	4	0
Junior totals			33	23	24	47	34
Senior totals			30	10	13	23	14

Preceded by Peter Ferraro	New York Rangers first-round draft pick 1993	Succeeded by Dan Cloutier
