= Steven Kamwendo =

Malawian politician

Stevin Stafford Kamwendo is a former Malawian politician. He was Deputy Minister of Foreign Affairs in 2010.

Stevin Stafford Kamwendo is a Malawi politician who is serving as a member of parliament in the Malawi National Assembly. He became a Member of Parliament in May 2009 and served in the late Dr. Bingu wa Mutharika's Cabinet between 2009 and 2011. He was appointed Deputy Minister for Ministry for Industry and Trade in May 2009. He was born on 30 November 1966 in a village called Kansadzu in the Ntcheu District in the Central Region of Malawi. In August 2010, Kamwendo was appointed Deputy Minister for the Ministry for Foreign Affairs following a cabinet reshuffle. He holds a bachelor's degree in Agriculture from the University of Malawi, Bunda College. Prior to his political career, he worked for European Union Projects in the Ministry of Agriculture in the Government of Malawi from 1997 to 2000 and again from 2006 to 2009. He also worked for Chemicals and Marketing Company as a Marketing and Sales Manager from 2004 to 2006. He has also worked as part of the lead team in the establishment of Food Security Programmes for International Eye Foundation from 1995 to 1997 and CARE International from 1997 to 1999 respectively.
