= SvenskaFans.com =

Swedish sports website

SvenskaFans.com is a Swedish sports related website started in September 2000 by Christer Fahlstedt, Anders Nettelbladt, Peter Muld and Michael Fahlstedt. It is the biggest sports website in Sweden. It was sold to Stampen Group in 2008, who in turn sold the website to Traveas in 2014.

Today the site covers Association football from Italy, Spain, Sweden, England, Germany, France, Portugal, Turkey, Scotland, USA, The Netherlands, The Czech Republic, Croatia and Switzerland. The site also contains low tier Swedish hockey up to the SHL and the NHL as well as Swedish bandy and floorball. The site also contains Formula 1 and some North American sports while also covering different kind of tournaments and sporting events around the world. They expanded and bought NorskeFans.com around 2006, but had to close it down in 2010 because it no longer was considered economically viable to continue operating.

SvenskaFans.com has several times been awarded the best sports site in Sweden by Internetworld. It has had 2000 moderators to keep track of the discussions, but has been criticized for rumours and unfounded statements on its message boards.
