= Mariam Osman Sherifay =

Swedish politician (born 1954)

Mariam Osman Sherifay S

Member of the Riksdag
- In office 25 August 2003 – 31 December 2004
- Constituency: Stockholm County

Personal details
- Born: 1 January 1954 (age 72) Cairo, Egypt
- Party: Social Democratic Party
- Profession: Politician

Mariam Osman Sherifay is a Swedish politician, social activist, pre-school teacher and former member of parliament.

== Career ==
Sherifay was a member of the Swedish parliament between 2002 and 2003, as a replacement for the Council of State, Björn von Sydow. She was a member of the Committee on Housing and a deputy for Committee on Foreign Affairs and the European Union Committee, among several other appointments.

In 2009 she was awarded the Swedish Martin Luther King Prize, an award founded by Swedish Fellowship of Reconciliation and the Swedish Baptist church for her fight against racism and her written call I refuse to be a victim.

== Personal life ==
Sherifay was born in Cairo, Egypt as the fourth of twelve siblings. Her father came from Eritrea and her mother was Egyptian. Her family was Muslim and attended Catholic schools. She came to Sweden in 1975.
