= Martin Grenier =

Canadian ice hockey player (born 1980)

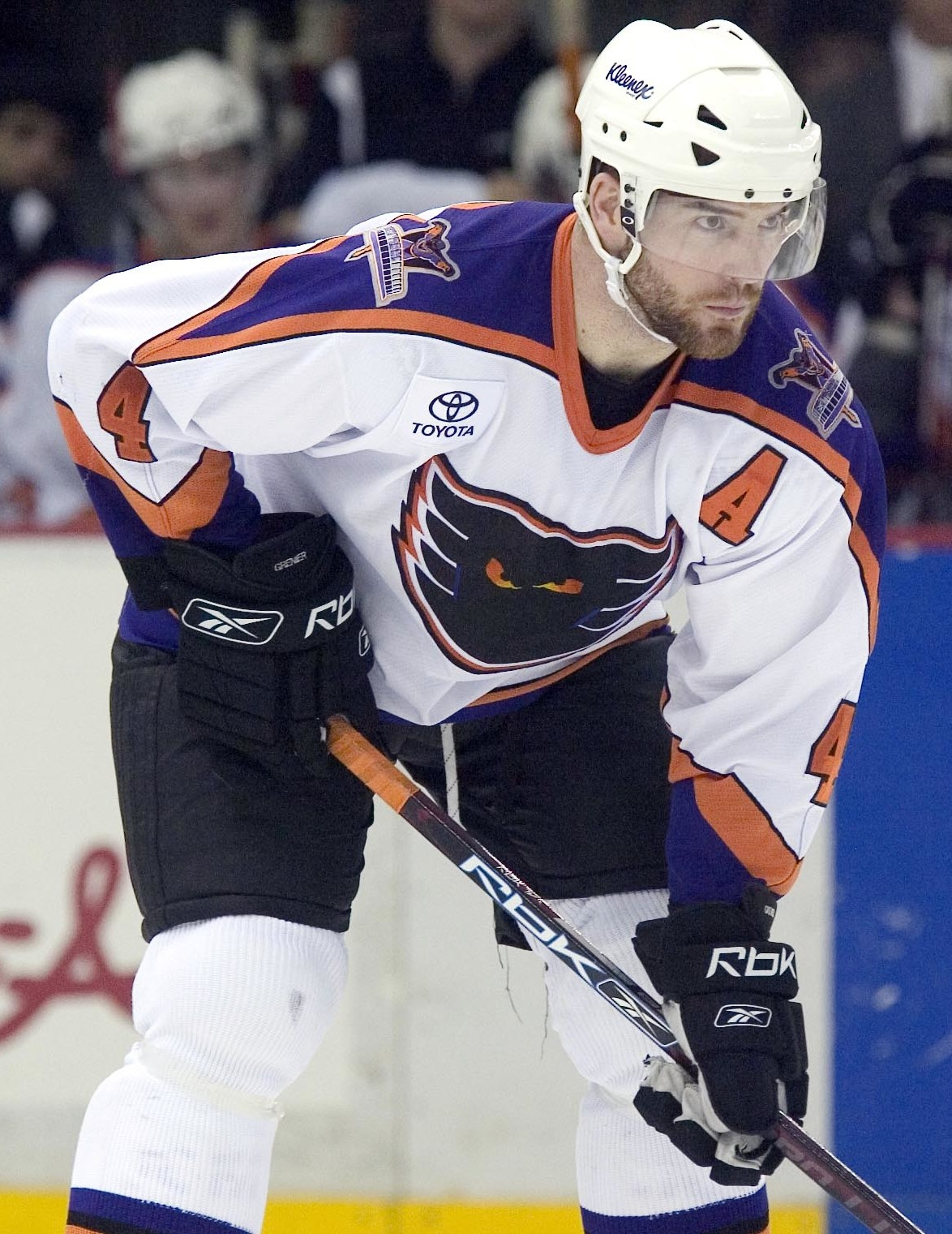
- Grenier with the Philadelphia Phantoms in 2006
- Born: November 2, 1980 (age 45) Laval, Quebec, Canada
- Height: 6 ft 5 in (196 cm)
- Weight: 265 lb (120 kg; 18 st 13 lb)
- Position: Defence
- Shot: Left
- Played for: Phoenix Coyotes; Vancouver Canucks; Philadelphia Flyers; Traktor Chelyabinsk
- NHL draft: 45th overall, 1999; Colorado Avalanche
- Playing career: 2001–2013

Martin Grenier (born November 2, 1980) is a Canadian former professional ice hockey defenceman who played in the National Hockey League (NHL) for the Phoenix Coyotes, Vancouver Canucks, and Philadelphia Flyers.

== Playing career ==
As a youth, Grenier played in the 1994 Quebec International Pee-Wee Hockey Tournament with the Sélects-du-Nord minor ice hockey team.

Drafted by the Colorado Avalanche 45th overall in the 1999 NHL entry draft, Grenier was traded to the Boston Bruins along with Brian Rolston, Samuel Pahlsson and a 2000 1st round draft pick for Ray Bourque and Dave Andreychuk on March 6, 2000. Left unsigned by Boston, Grenier signed with the Phoenix Coyotes prior to the 2001–02 season. Since beginning his pro career, he spent most of his time in the AHL with a few callups to the NHL with the Coyotes, Vancouver Canucks, and Philadelphia Flyers.

In the 2008–09 season, Grenier signed with the newly formed KHL, joining Traktor Chelyabinsk and establishing himself as one of the league's premier fighters.

On June 18, 2011, Grenier was the second selection in the 2011 LNAH Draft.

== Career statistics ==
			Regular season					Playoffs
Season	Team	League	GP	G	A	Pts	PIM	GP	G	A	Pts	PIM
1997–98	Quebec Remparts	QMJHL	61	4	11	15	202	14	0	2	2	36
1998–99	Quebec Remparts	QMJHL	60	7	18	25	479	13	0	4	4	29
1999–2000	Quebec Remparts	QMJHL	67	11	35	46	302	7	1	4	5	27
2000–01	Quebec Remparts	QMJHL	26	5	16	21	82	—	—	—	—	—
2000–01	Victoriaville Tigres	QMJHL	28	9	19	28	108	13	2	8	10	51
2001–02	Phoenix Coyotes	NHL	5	0	0	0	5	—	—	—	—	—
2001–02	Springfield Falcons	AHL	69	2	6	8	241	—	—	—	—	—
2002–03	Springfield Falcons	AHL	73	2	10	12	232	6	0	1	1	12
2002–03	Phoenix Coyotes	NHL	3	0	0	0	0	—	—	—	—	—
2003–04	Manitoba Moose	AHL	38	5	4	9	145	—	—	—	—	—
2003–04	Vancouver Canucks	NHL	7	1	0	1	9	—	—	—	—	—
2003–04	Hartford Wolf Pack	AHL	12	0	2	2	105	9	0	1	1	32
2004–05	Hartford Wolf Pack	AHL	23	2	5	7	136	5	0	0	0	32
2004–05	Charlotte Checkers	ECHL	4	0	2	2	10	—	—	—	—	—
2005–06	Hartford Wolf Pack	AHL	76	4	8	12	278	11	0	0	0	33
2006–07	Philadelphia Phantoms	AHL	57	2	1	3	156	—	—	—	—	—
2006–07	Philadelphia Flyers	NHL	3	0	0	0	0	—	—	—	—	—
2007–08	Philadelphia Phantoms	AHL	34	1	2	3	78	3	0	0	0	0
2008–09	Traktor Chelyabinsk	KHL	46	2	5	7	211	3	0	0	0	2
2009–10	Traktor Chelyabinsk	KHL	46	0	8	8	177	4	0	0	0	6
2011–12	Saguenay Marquis	LNAH	44	2	11	13	222	6	0	0	0	16
2012–13	Jonquière Marquis	LNAH	36	3	0	3	154	11	0	1	1	50
NHL totals			18	1	0	1	14	—	—	—	—	—
KHL totals			92	2	13	15	388	7	0	0	0	8
