= Johnny Oduya =

Swedish ice hockey player (born 1981)

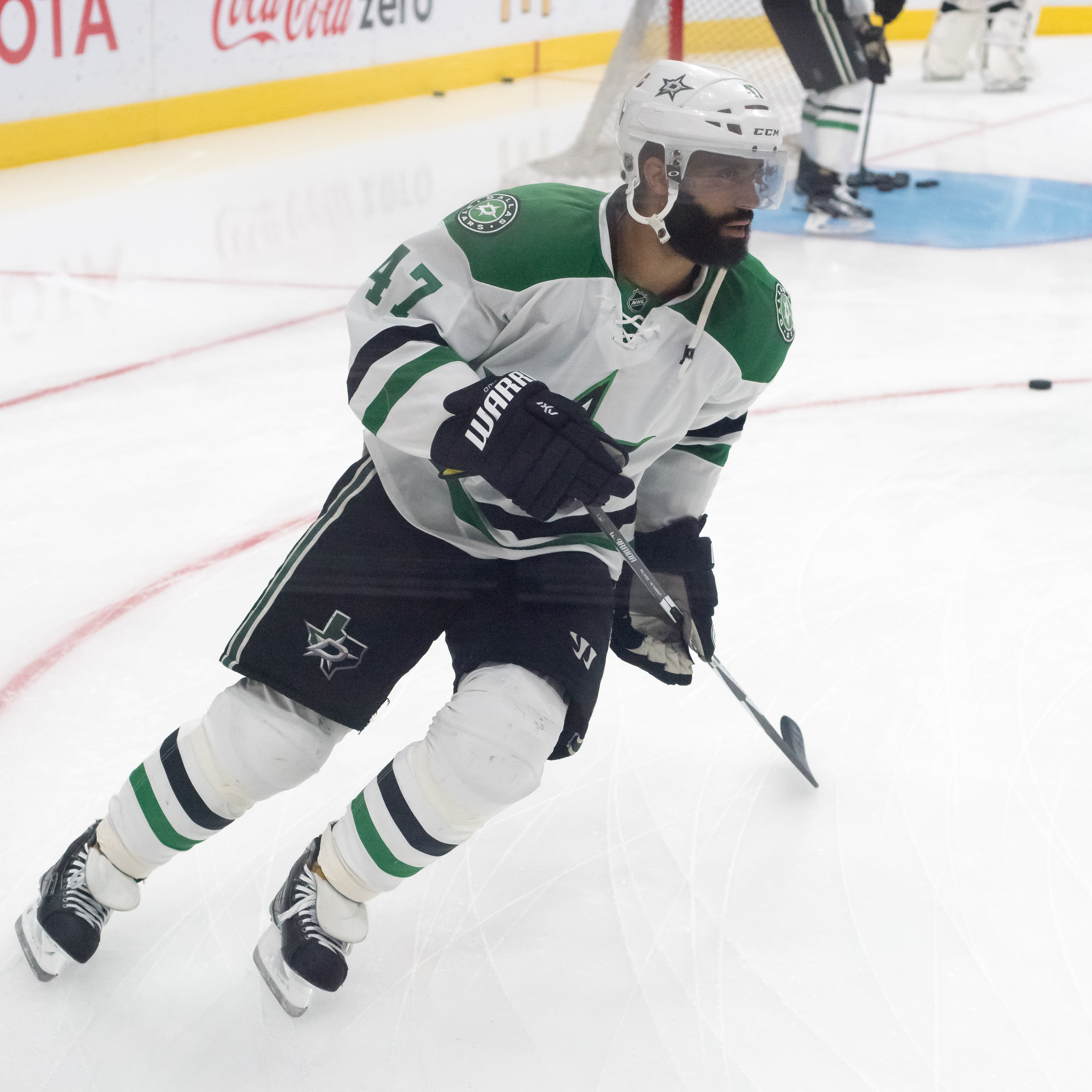
- Oduya with the Dallas Stars in April 2016
- Born: 1 October 1981 (age 45) Stockholm, Sweden
- Height: 6 ft 0 in (183 cm)
- Weight: 195 lb (88 kg; 13 st 13 lb)
- Position: Defence
- Shot: Left
- Played for: Djurgårdens IF; Frölunda HC; New Jersey Devils; Atlanta Thrashers; Winnipeg Jets; Chicago Blackhawks; Dallas Stars; Ottawa Senators; Philadelphia Flyers
- National team: Sweden
- NHL draft: 221st overall, 2001; Washington Capitals
- Playing career: 1999–2018

David Johnny Oduya (born 1 October 1981) is a Swedish former professional ice hockey defenceman who played in the National Hockey League (NHL). Oduya is a two-time Stanley Cup champion with the Chicago Blackhawks in 2013 and 2015.

== Playing career ==
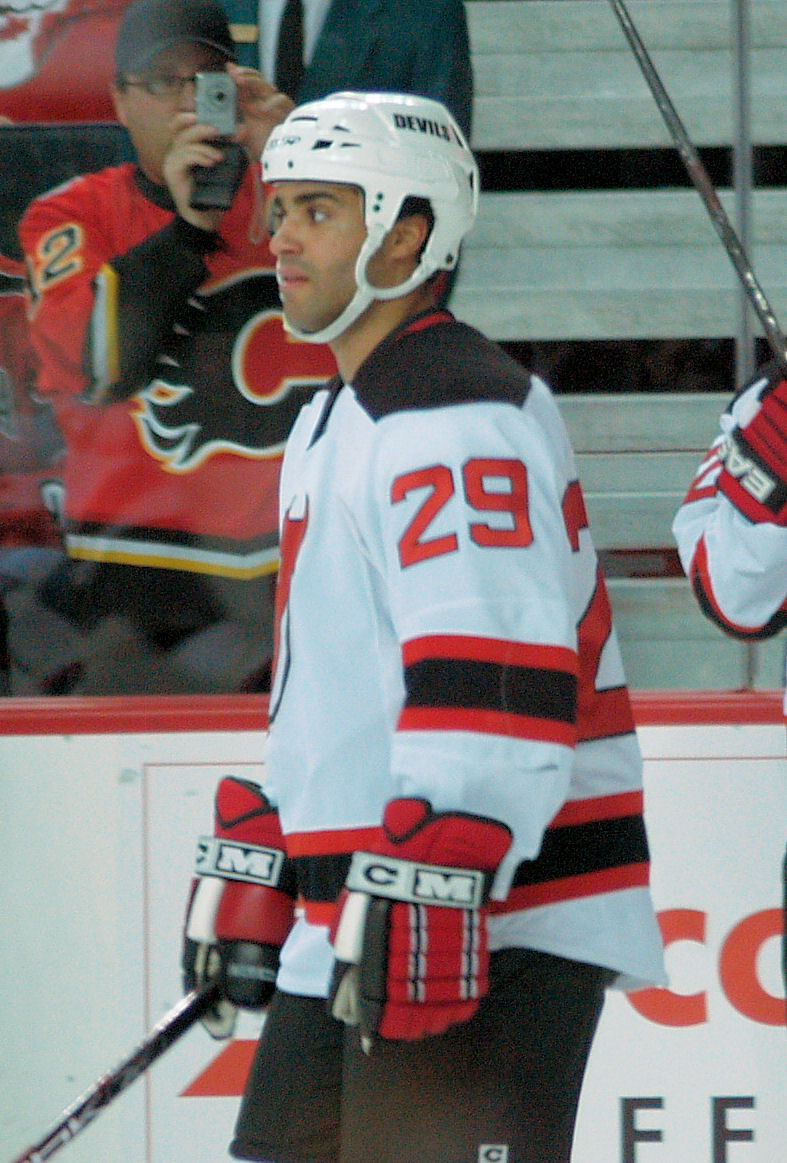
Oduya with the New Jersey Devils

=== Early career ===
Oduya's first club was Hammarby IF, where he played as a junior. In 2000, at the age of 19, he moved to North America to play in the Quebec Major Junior Hockey League (QMJHL). He spent one season in North America, splitting time between the Victoriaville Tigres and Moncton Wildcats. After moving back to Sweden, he played two seasons with Hammarby in HockeyAllsvenskan before signing a contract with Djurgårdens IF in the Swedish Elitserien. During the two seasons he spent with the team, he was known as an aggressive defenceman and an enforcer. At times, he fought with opposition players and registered high penalties in minutes numbers. Despite this, he was also a dependable player and played regularly in the Swedish national team during the Euro Hockey Tour. In the 2005–06 season, after he had been dismissed by the Washington Capitals, the NHL organization that drafted him 221st overall in 2001, he moved to another Swedish team, Frölunda HC. With Frölunda, he played as a more offensive defenceman, scoring eight goals and 11 assists.

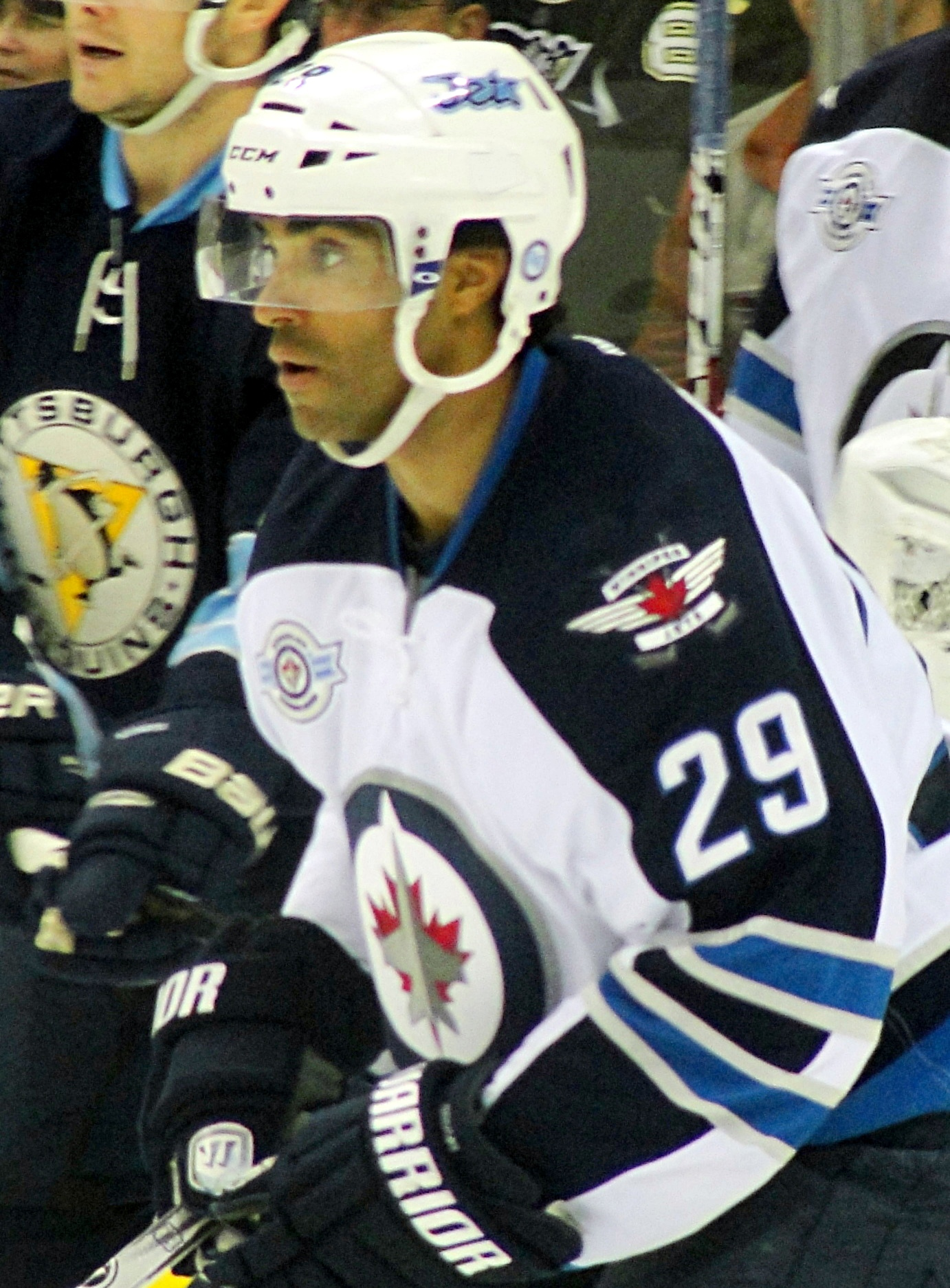
Oduya with the Winnipeg Jets in 2012

=== New Jersey Devils ===
The following season, 2006–07, Oduya signed with the New Jersey Devils in the NHL. Although expected by many to be a depth player with the Devils, when several of the team's defenders were injured, Oduya earned a spot in the lineup. He played surprisingly well in the NHL, periodically registering nearly 20 minutes of ice time per game. He played in 76 Devils games that season, only missing eight due to a mid-season injury. However, in the 2007 Stanley Cup playoffs, he was not dressed for New Jersey when the Devils were defeated in the second round, largely due to the impressive play of rookie defenceman Andy Greene. After several successful NHL seasons, Oduya was named to the Swedish roster for the 2010 Winter Olympics in Vancouver, British Columbia, Canada.

=== Atlanta Thrashers/Winnipeg Jets ===
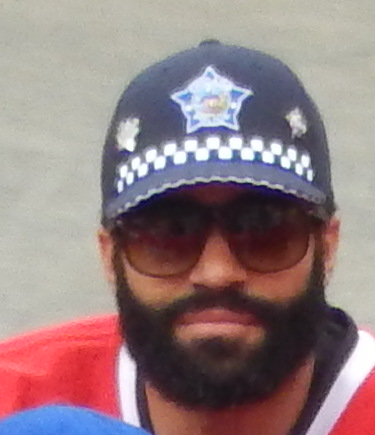
Oduya in June 2015 at the Chicago Blackhawks Stanley Cup championship parade

On 4 February 2010, he was traded to the Atlanta Thrashers, along with Niclas Bergfors, Patrice Cormier and a first-round draft pick in 2010, in exchange for Ilya Kovalchuk and Anssi Salmela. Oduya skated for the team during its inaugural season after moving to Winnipeg, Manitoba to become the Winnipeg Jets.

=== Chicago Blackhawks ===
On 27 February 2012, Oduya was traded to the Chicago Blackhawks for a second- and third-round pick in 2013.

In October 2012, during the 2012–13 NHL lockout, Oduya traveled to Bangkok, Thailand, to play for the local Flying Farangs team in the 18th Annual "Land of Smiles" Hockey tournament. He carried his team to the championship against Abu-Dhabi, and helped bring home Bangkok's first title in tournament history.

In June 2013, Oduya won his first Stanley Cup with the Chicago Blackhawks, who defeated the Boston Bruins in six games in the Final. In game six of the Stanley Cup Finals, Oduya assisted on the Cup winning goal scored by Dave Bolland. Oduya's shot came from the left point and deflected off the stick of Michael Frolík. Bolland, in position in front of the Boston goal, pushed the deflected shot past Bruins goaltender Tuukka Rask to give the Blackhawks their second Stanley Cup in four years.

On 15 June 2015, at the United Center in Chicago, Oduya won his second Stanley Cup with the Chicago Blackhawks over the Tampa Bay Lightning in six games. It was the Blackhawks' third Stanley Cup in six years. He ended the 2015 playoffs goalless wirh five assists and points in all 23 games. After the series ended, it was revealed that Oduya had suffered an elbow tear as a result from getting tripped by Lightning’ forward Nikita Kucherov.

=== Dallas Stars ===
After four seasons with the Blackhawks, Oduya left as a free agent and signed a two-year contract with the Dallas Stars on 15 July 2015. Blackhawks teammate Patrick Sharp also joined the Stars a few weeks earlier via trade.

=== Later years: Second stint in Chicago, Ottawa and Philadelphia ===
In the final year of his contract with the Stars in the 2016–17 season, Oduya was traded back to Chicago in exchange for Mark McNeill and a conditional fourth-round draft pick on 28 February 2017. He played out the season with the Blackhawks appearing in 15 regular season games for 1 goal and 1 assist.

As a free agent, having left the Blackhawks for a second time, Oduya agreed to a one-year bonus-ladened contract with the Ottawa Senators on 24 July 2017. After being placed on waivers by the Senators, Oduya was claimed by the Philadelphia Flyers on 26 February 2018. After playing in only one game as a Flyer on 4 March, he was pulled out of the lineup with a lower body injury on 10 March. He did not play another game with the Flyers before his contract expired.

== Personal life ==
Oduya is the son of a Kenyan father and a Swedish mother. He is the younger brother of the late Fredrik Oduya, a former NHL draftee who was an enforcer in the minor leagues.

== Career statistics ==
=== Regular season and playoffs ===
			Regular season					Playoffs
Season	Team	League	GP	G	A	Pts	PIM	GP	G	A	Pts	PIM
1996–97	Hammarby IF	J20	13	0	0	0	—	—	—	—	—	—
1997–98	Hammarby IF	J20 II	26	3	11	14	70	—	—	—	—	—
1998–99	Hammarby IF	J20 II	38	14	31	45	45	—	—	—	—	—
1999–00	Hammarby IF	J20	32	3	18	21	48	6	1	2	3	4
1999–00	Hammarby IF	Allsv	1	0	0	0	0	1	0	0	0	0
2000–01	Moncton Wildcats	QMJHL	44	11	38	49	147	—	—	—	—	—
2000–01	Victoriaville Tigres	QMJHL	24	3	16	19	112	13	4	9	13	10
2001–02	Hammarby IF	Allsv	46	11	14	25	66	2	1	0	1	4
2002–03	Hammarby IF	Allsv	38	8	20	28	162	10	7	5	12	38
2003–04	Djurgårdens IF	SEL	42	4	4	8	173	4	0	0	0	6
2004–05	Djurgårdens IF	SEL	49	2	4	6	139	12	0	2	2	39
2005–06	Frölunda HC	SEL	47	8	11	19	95	17	1	2	3	16
2006–07	New Jersey Devils	NHL	76	2	9	11	61	6	0	1	1	6
2007–08	New Jersey Devils	NHL	75	6	20	26	46	5	0	1	1	6
2008–09	New Jersey Devils	NHL	82	7	22	29	30	7	0	0	0	2
2009–10	New Jersey Devils	NHL	40	2	2	4	18	—	—	—	—	—
2009–10	Atlanta Thrashers	NHL	27	1	8	9	12	—	—	—	—	—
2010–11	Atlanta Thrashers	NHL	82	2	15	17	22	—	—	—	—	—
2011–12	Winnipeg Jets	NHL	63	2	11	13	33	—	—	—	—	—
2011–12	Chicago Blackhawks	NHL	18	1	4	5	0	6	0	3	3	0
2012–13	Chicago Blackhawks	NHL	48	3	9	12	10	23	3	5	8	16
2013–14	Chicago Blackhawks	NHL	77	3	13	16	38	19	2	5	7	8
2014–15	Chicago Blackhawks	NHL	76	2	8	10	26	23	0	5	5	6
2015–16	Dallas Stars	NHL	82	4	17	21	26	13	1	2	3	2
2016–17	Dallas Stars	NHL	37	1	6	7	10	—	—	—	—	—
2016–17	Chicago Blackhawks	NHL	15	1	1	2	8	4	0	0	0	0
2017–18	Ottawa Senators	NHL	51	4	4	8	32	—	—	—	—	—
2017–18	Philadelphia Flyers	NHL	1	0	0	0	0	—	—	—	—	—
SHL totals			138	14	19	33	407	33	1	4	5	61
NHL totals			850	41	149	190	372	106	6	22	28	46

Medal record

Men's ice hockey

Representing Sweden

Olympic Games
Silver medal – second place	2014 Sochi	

World Championships
Bronze medal – third place	2009 Kloten	

=== International ===
Year	Team	Event	Result	GP	G	A	Pts	PIM
2009	Sweden	WC	3rd place, bronze medalist(s)	5	3	1	4	2
2010	Sweden	OG	5th	4	0	0	0	12
2014	Sweden	OG	2nd place, silver medalist(s)	6	0	1	1	0
Senior totals				15	3	2	5	14

== Awards and honors ==
Awards	Year
NHL
Stanley Cup (Chicago Blackhawks)	2013, 2015

== See also ==
- List of ice hockey players of black African descent
