= Thabo Motsieloa =

Swedish television news presenter and former actor

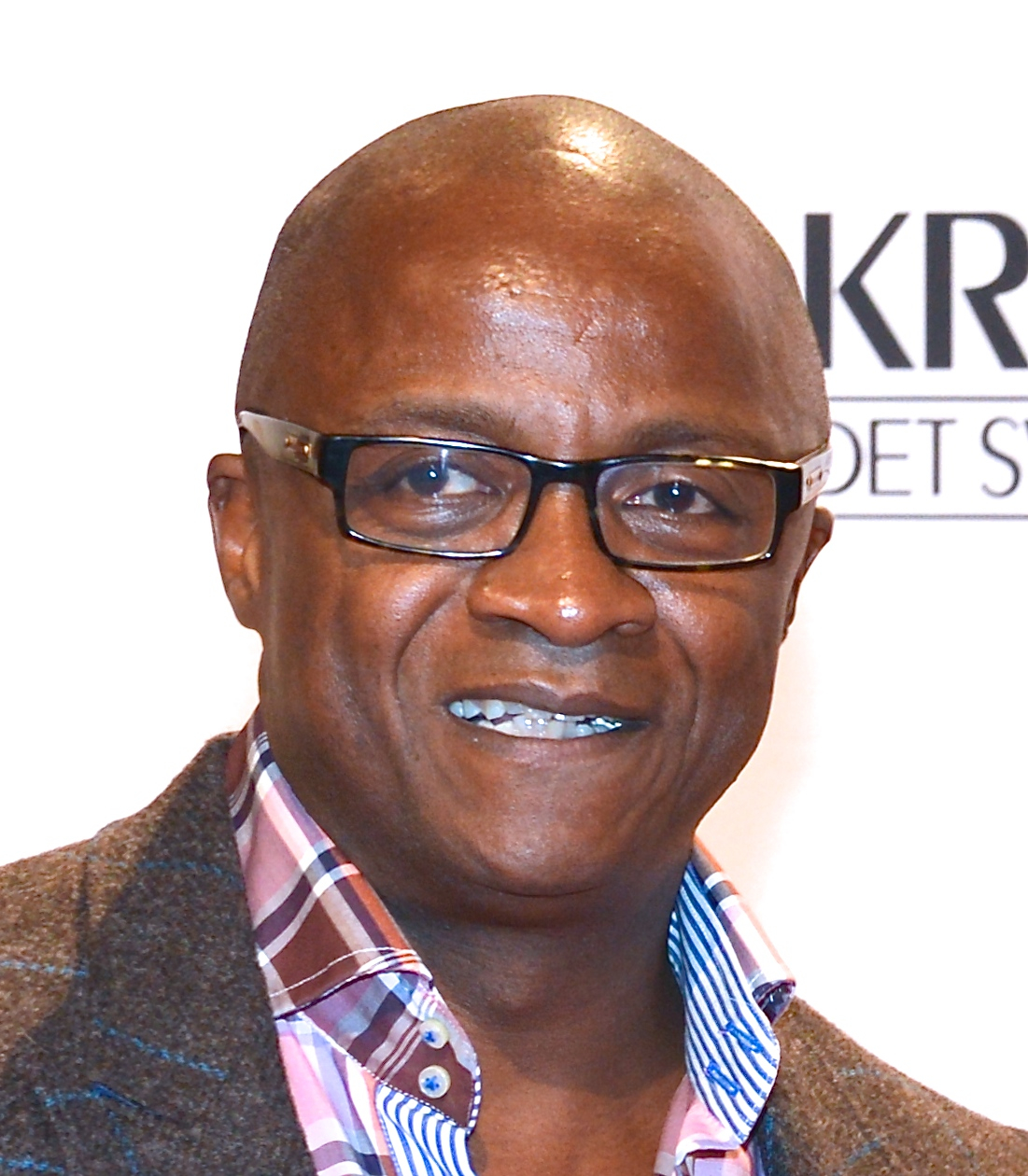
- Thabo Motsieloa in 2013
- Born: Thabo Motsieloa; 17 March 1961 (age 65); London, England

Thabo Motsieloa (born 17 November 1961) is a Swedish television news presenter and former actor.

In 1983 he founded the martial arts sports club Södermalms shaolin kung fu.

Motsieloa founded Thabo Motsieloa Masters Cup a mixed martial arts competition using Allstyle, combat sport rules that allows a wide variety of fighting techniques. Motsieloa designed the rules and regulations. This event is one of the biggest Martial Arts competitions in Scandinavia.

Motsieloa wrote columns for newspaper Aftonbladet in the early 1990s, before he moved to television, where he led TV shows such as current affairs debate program Black or White, Cold Case Sweden and investigative journalism program Drevet. During the summers of 2005 and 2006 he worked as a news broadcaster for TV 4 and in 2008 he was a sports commentator during the Olympic Games.

As an actor, he has appeared in Speranza at Uppsala City Theater (1992), and other plays.

Since 2013 he has been the co-host of Aftonbladet TV's Brottscentralen a documentary/reality legal series that chronicles the daily lives of police officers.

== Personal life ==
He was born 17 November 1961 in London, England. His parents are from South Africa and met while attending university in the UK. In 1962 they moved to Sweden. His mother was a nurse, therapist and international aid worker. His father was a medical doctor and jazz musician. Motsieloa grew up in the Solna, Vallentuna and Sollentuna municipality in Stockholm County.
