= Kristián Kudroč =

Slovak ice hockey player (born 1981)

- Born: May 21, 1981 (age 44) Michalovce, Czechoslovakia
- Height: 6 ft 7 in (201 cm)
- Weight: 225 lb (102 kg; 16 st 1 lb)
- Position: Defence
- Shot: Right
- Played for: Tampa Bay Lightning; Florida Panthers; SaiPa; Ilves; Södertälje SK; Brynäs IF; Frölunda HC; Ässät; Sibir Novosibirsk; Barys Astana; HC Plzeň; HC TWK Innsbruck; Nottingham Panthers
- National team: Slovakia
- NHL draft: 28th overall, 1999; New York Islanders
- Playing career: 2000–2017

Kristián Kudroč (born May 21, 1981) is a Slovak former professional ice hockey defenceman.

== Playing career ==
Kudroč was drafted by the New York Islanders as their first-round pick, 28th overall, in the 1999 NHL entry draft. He is a large, physical defenceman with an impressive slapshot. He played in North America from 1999 to 2005, and represented SaiPa in the Finnish SM-liiga in the 2005–06 season, where SaiPafanit (the SaiPa fan club) elected Kudroč Player of the Year.

Kudroc suffered a pre-season injury in a Tournament game with Barys Astana prior to the 2014–15 season. Kudroc was ruled out for the duration of the season in order to rehabilitate. As a free agent, Kudroc moved on from Astana and signed a one-year contract with Metallurg Novokuznetsk on June 4, 2015. On August 17, 2015, Kudroc sought a release from his contract with Metallurg for personal reasons. He returned to Czech Republic, signing a contract after a years hiatus with HC Plzeň of the Extraliga on December 14, 2015.

On July 14, 2016, Kudroc agreed to a one-year contract as a free agent to move to Austria, with EBEL club HC TWK Innsbruck. He featured in 8 games with Innsbruck before on November 6, 2016, he moved to the UK to sign for Nottingham Panthers of the EIHL. However, in December 2016, after playing in another 8 games, Kudroc again ceased his playing contract with Nottingham, departing for personal reasons relating to a serious illness within his family in his native Slovakia.

== Career statistics ==
=== Regular season and playoffs ===
			Regular season					Playoffs
Season	Team	League	GP	G	A	Pts	PIM	GP	G	A	Pts	PIM
1996–97	HC VTJ MEZ Michalovce	SVK U20	47	14	8	22	180	—	—	—	—	—
1997–98	HC VTJ MEZ Michalovce	SVK U20	47	7	4	11	66	—	—	—	—	—
1997–98	HC VTJ MEZ Michalovce	SVK.2	4	0	0	0	0	—	—	—	—	—
1998–99	HC VTJ MEZ Michalovce	SVK.2	17	0	3	3	12	—	—	—	—	—
1999–2000	Quebec Remparts	QMJHL	57	9	22	31	172	11	2	5	7	29
2000–01	Detroit Vipers	IHL	44	4	3	7	80	—	—	—	—	—
2000–01	Tampa Bay Lightning	NHL	22	2	2	4	36	—	—	—	—	—
2001–02	Tampa Bay Lightning	NHL	2	0	0	0	0	—	—	—	—	—
2001–02	Springfield Falcons	AHL	55	0	8	8	126	—	—	—	—	—
2001–02	Philadelphia Phantoms	AHL	10	0	3	3	14	5	1	1	2	21
2002–03	Springfield Falcons	AHL	35	0	4	4	58	—	—	—	—	—
2003–04	San Antonio Rampage	AHL	47	1	4	5	120	—	—	—	—	—
2003–04	Florida Panthers	NHL	2	0	0	0	2	—	—	—	—	—
2004–05	Quebec Radio X	LNAH	11	0	2	2	65	—	—	—	—	—
2004–05	Hammarby IF	Allsv	46	1	10	11	36	—	—	—	—	—
2005–06	SaiPa	SM-l	48	10	12	22	227	7	1	1	2	29
2006–07	Ilves	SM-l	37	7	7	14	174	6	1	1	2	4
2007–08	Södertälje SK	SEL	51	2	7	9	156	—	—	—	—	—
2008–09	Södertälje SK	SEL	52	4	8	12	103	—	—	—	—	—
2009–10	Brynäs IF	SEL	10	0	0	0	16	—	—	—	—	—
2009–10	Frölunda HC	SEL	28	1	5	6	92	—	—	—	—	—
2009–10	Ässät	SM-l	13	0	7	7	20	—	—	—	—	—
2010–11	Ässät	SM-l	52	3	9	12	130	3	1	0	1	8
2011–12	Ässät	SM-l	60	9	18	27	58	4	0	1	1	12
2012–13	Sibir Novosibirsk	KHL	49	9	11	20	55	7	3	1	4	10
2013–14	Sibir Novosibirsk	KHL	40	5	5	10	92	—	—	—	—	—
2013–14	Barys Astana	KHL	8	0	4	4	6	9	1	2	3	14
2015–16	HC Škoda Plzeň	ELH	21	1	3	4	63	7	0	0	0	10
2016–17	HC TWK Innsbruck	EBEL	8	1	2	3	16	—	—	—	—	—
2016–17	Nottingham Panthers	EIHL	8	0	3	3	10	—	—	—	—	—
NHL totals			26	2	2	4	38	—	—	—	—	—
SM-l totals			210	29	53	82	609	20	3	3	6	53
SEL totals			141	7	20	27	367	10	1	2	3	12

=== International ===
Medal record

Representing Slovakia

Ice hockey

World Championships
Silver medal – second place	2012 Helsinki	

Year	Team	Event	Result	GP	G	A	Pts	PIM
1999	Slovakia	WJC18	3rd place, bronze medalist(s)	7	0	1	1	11
2000	Slovakia	WJC	9th	7	0	0	0	8
2012	Slovakia	WC	2nd place, silver medalist(s)	1	0	0	0	0
Junior totals				14	0	1	1	19
Senior totals				1	0	0	0	0

Awards and achievements
Preceded by Branislav Mezei	New York Islanders first-round draft pick 1999	Succeeded by Rick DiPietro
