= Elena-Maria Smon Wolay =

Swedish entertainer

Elena-Maria Smon Wolay (born 23 April 1986) is a Swedish entertainment personality, DJ, cabaret dancer, blogger and nightclub concept developer.

Elena Wolay grew up in Jönköping to parents from Eritrea.

She is in charge of developing nightclub concepts for 'Berns', one of Stockholms more famous establishments plus serving as afterwork resident-DJ at five star hotel Reisen and running a jazz club among other projects.

Smon Wolay has also deejayed at the Swedish Sex and the City 2 gala premiere, Way Out West music festival, the wedding of Jan Bengtsson (heir to clothing company H&M) and Cirkusprinsessan, an international circus world championship for females only. She has also modeled in Nöjesguiden magazine.
