= Buba Badjie =

Swedish veterinarian

Buba Badjie is a Gambian–Swedish veterinarian and entrepreneur born 1967 in the village of Jambanjelli, The Gambia.

Badjie was born into a farming community. His parents had cattle and grew mango and peanuts. He excelled in the village school and got the opportunity to attend an elite school, also used by the president of Gambia's children. His interest in academia and farming inspired him to become a veterinarian. He looked for scholarships around the world to acquire such a degree. He ended up attending veterinary studies in Ukraine Agriculture University, Kiev (then part of the USSR). He learned Russian in 6 months and graduated a few years later.

Badjie made regular visits to Sweden and met his future wife Cecilia. When he arrived in Sweden it turned out he could not work as a veterinarian with a Soviet degree and attended Swedish University of Agricultural Sciences, faculty of veterinary medicine in Uppsala, Sweden. After graduating as a veterinarian for the second time, Badjie worked as DVO in the province of Gästrikland as station manager and as the Manager Veterinary Services and Veterinary Technical Manager for Sweden and Finland for Procter & Gamble/ The Iams Company Europe (based in Switzerland). While he enjoyed his job with Procter & Gamble his dream was to return to his new home land Sweden and open his own veterinary clinic in Stockholm.

Today he owns and operates animal hospital Bromma Djurklinik.

== Television and media ==
Badjie came to national attention in 2000 when he participated in Expedition Robinson (see Expedition Robinson 2000). It was the first production worldwide of the show that has since been produced in many countries under the name Survivor.

In 2005 he was the focal point in a documentary called Mitt jobb: Buba – veterinär, the program was produced by The Swedish Educational Broadcasting Company to educate Swedish high school students about being a veterinarian.

In 2007, he was featured in ads and became a spokesperson for Fri Företagsamhet promoting entrepreneurship.
