= 1999–2000 NHL season =

National Hockey League season

- Millennium patch celebrating the year 2000
- League: National Hockey League
- Sport: Ice hockey
- Duration: October 1, 1999 – June 10, 2000
- Games: 82
- Teams: 28
- TV partner(s): CBC, CTV Sportsnet, SRC (Canada); ESPN/ABC (United States)

Draft
- Top draft pick: Patrik Stefan
- Picked by: Atlanta Thrashers

Regular season
- Presidents' Trophy: St. Louis Blues
- Season MVP: Chris Pronger (Blues)
- Top scorer: Jaromir Jagr (Penguins)

Playoffs
- Playoffs MVP: Scott Stevens (Devils)

Stanley Cup
- Champions: New Jersey Devils
- Runners-up: Dallas Stars

NHL seasons
- 1998–99 2000–01

The 1999–2000 NHL season was the 83rd regular season of the National Hockey League. With the addition of the expansion Atlanta Thrashers, 28 teams each played 82 games. This was the first season played in which teams were awarded a point for an overtime loss. The New Jersey Devils defeated the defending champion Dallas Stars for their second Stanley Cup championship. During the regular season, no player reached the 100-point plateau, the first time in a non-lockout season since the 1967–68 season. Also, in the 2000 Stanley Cup playoffs, the New Jersey Devils overcame a three-games-to-one deficit against the Philadelphia Flyers to win the Eastern Conference Finals.

== League business ==
=== Expansion ===
The 1999–2000 season was the inaugural year for the Atlanta Thrashers. They would join the Southeast Division, marking the return of the NHL to Atlanta since the Atlanta Flames moved to Calgary in 1980. The 1999 NHL expansion draft was held on June 25 to fill the new Thrashers roster.

=== Entry draft ===
The 1999 NHL entry draft was held on June 26 at the FleetCenter in Boston. Patrik Stefan was selected first overall by the expansion Atlanta Thrashers.

=== Rule changes ===
- The rule prohibiting a player from having a skate in the crease was abolished. This was a reaction to the controversial goal scored by Brett Hull in the 1999 Stanley Cup Finals
- Overtime during the regular season will now have four skaters per side, instead of the 5-on-5. Furthermore, teams will earn one point in the standings for an overtime loss instead of none. These changes were intended to discourage teams from playing very defensively during the overtime to guarantee the single point from a tie. The number of ties had been going up for some years, and the league was able to successfully reverse that trend with these changes.
- The four-official system (two referees and two linesmen) continued its phase-in regularly in which teams played 25 home and 25 road games (50 games per team) for a total of 700 games with four officials. The system was also used for all playoff games again.

== Uniform changes ==
- League wide:
  - An "NHL 2000" patch was worn this season to celebrate the turn of the millennium.
  - Wayne Gretzky's jersey number, 99, was retired league-wide on February 6, 2000, at the season's All–Star Game.
- Anaheim: Jade Alternates Retired. Eggplant pants with Jade Stripes are restored.
- Atlanta: White jerseys have the team logo, while the road darks have the alternate mark. The team wore inaugural season patches for their first season.
- Carolina: Shade of red is darkened. In addition to the NHL 2000 Patch, the Hurricanes wore two other patches this season, one celebrated the opening of the Raleigh Entertainment and Sports Arena, and the other was in Memory of Steve Chiasson, who died in a single-vehicle, alcohol-involved crash after the Hurricanes were eliminated in the 1999 Stanley Cup playoffs.
- Chicago: The tan outline on the crest is removed.
- Colorado: Shade of Burgundy is darkened from 1998–1999.
- Dallas: The alternates from 1998–1999 become the basis of the team's new home Uniform. the actual 1998–1999 Alternates become the new road uniform.
- Los Angeles: New Purple alternates introduced.
- New York Rangers: Navy Blue Lady Liberty Alternates return.
- Ottawa: The Alternates from the 1998–1999 become the new Road Uniforms
- Phoenix: Crest on the alternates get a sand-colored outline.
- Tampa Bay: The alternate jerseys are dropped.
- Toronto: All-star game patch worn for 2000 NHL All-Star Game. The Alternates worn during the 1998–1999 season for the last year at Maple Leaf Gardens go on a one-year hiatus.

== Arena changes ==
- The expansion Atlanta Thrashers moved into Philips Arena.
- The Buffalo Sabres' home arena, Marine Midland Arena, was renamed HSBC Arena on March 17, 2000, in recognition of Marine Midland Bank's parent company HSBC retiring the Marine Midland brand.
- The Carolina Hurricanes moved from Greensboro Coliseum in Greensboro, North Carolina to the Raleigh Entertainment & Sports Arena in Raleigh, North Carolina.
- The Colorado Avalanche moved from McNichols Sports Arena to the Pepsi Center.
- The Los Angeles Kings moved from the Great Western Forum in Inglewood, California to the Staples Center in downtown Los Angeles.
- The Pittsburgh Penguins's home arena, Pittsburgh Civic Arena, was renamed Mellon Arena after Mellon Financial purchased the naming rights.

== Regular season ==
=== All-Star Game ===
The All-Star Game was held on February 6, 2000, at Air Canada Centre in Toronto, the home to the Toronto Maple Leafs.

=== Final standings ===
==== Eastern Conference ====
Atlantic Division
No.	CR		GP	W	L	T	OTL	GF	GA	Pts
1	1	**Philadelphia Flyers**	82	45	22	12	3	237	179	105
2	4	**New Jersey Devils**	82	45	24	8	5	251	203	103
3	7	**Pittsburgh Penguins**	82	37	31	8	6	241	236	88
4	11	New York Rangers	82	29	38	12	3	218	246	73
5	13	New York Islanders	82	24	48	9	1	194	275	58

Northeast Division
No.	CR		GP	W	L	T	OTL	GF	GA	Pts
1	3	**Toronto Maple Leafs**	82	45	27	7	3	246	222	100
2	6	**Ottawa Senators**	82	41	28	11	2	244	210	95
3	8	**Buffalo Sabres**	82	35	32	11	4	213	204	85
4	10	Montreal Canadiens	82	35	34	9	4	196	194	83
5	11	Boston Bruins	82	24	33	19	6	210	248	73

Southeast Division
No.	CR		GP	W	L	T	OTL	GF	GA	Pts
1	2	**Washington Capitals**	82	44	24	12	2	227	194	102
2	5	**Florida Panthers**	82	43	27	6	6	244	209	98
3	9	Carolina Hurricanes	82	37	35	10	0	217	216	84
4	14	Tampa Bay Lightning	82	19	47	9	7	204	310	54
5	15	Atlanta Thrashers	82	14	57	7	4	170	313	39

Eastern Conference
R		Div	GP	W	L	T	OTL	GF	GA	Pts
**1**	**z – Philadelphia Flyers**	**AT**	**82**	**45**	**22**	**12**	**3**	**237**	**179**	105
**2**	**y – Washington Capitals**	**SE**	**82**	**44**	**24**	**12**	**2**	**227**	**194**	102
**3**	**y – Toronto Maple Leafs**	**NE**	**82**	**45**	**27**	**7**	**3**	**246**	**222**	100
**4**	**New Jersey Devils**	**AT**	**82**	**45**	**24**	**8**	**5**	**251**	**203**	103
**5**	**Florida Panthers**	**SE**	**82**	**43**	**27**	**6**	**6**	**244**	**209**	98
**6**	**Ottawa Senators**	**NE**	**82**	**41**	**28**	**11**	**2**	**244**	**210**	95
**7**	**Pittsburgh Penguins**	**AT**	**82**	**37**	**31**	**8**	**6**	**241**	**236**	88
**8**	**Buffalo Sabres**	**NE**	**82**	**35**	**32**	**11**	**4**	**213**	**204**	85
8.5
9	Carolina Hurricanes	SE	82	37	35	10	0	217	216	84
10	Montreal Canadiens	NE	82	35	34	9	4	196	194	83
11	New York Rangers	AT	82	29	38	12	3	218	246	73
12	Boston Bruins	NE	82	24	33	19	6	210	248	73
13	New York Islanders	AT	82	24	48	9	1	194	275	58
14	Tampa Bay Lightning	SE	82	19	47	9	7	204	310	54
15	Atlanta Thrashers	SE	82	14	57	7	4	170	313	39

Divisions: AT – Atlantic, NE – Northeast, SE – Southeast

bold – Qualified for playoffs; z – Won conference; y – Won division

==== Western Conference ====
Central Division
No.	CR		GP	W	L	T	OTL	GF	GA	Pts
1	1	**St. Louis Blues**	82	51	19	11	1	248	165	114
2	4	**Detroit Red Wings**	82	48	22	10	2	278	210	108
3	11	Chicago Blackhawks	82	33	37	10	2	242	245	78
4	13	Nashville Predators	82	28	40	7	7	199	240	70

Northwest Division
No.	CR		GP	W	L	T	OTL	GF	GA	Pts
1	3	**Colorado Avalanche**	82	42	28	11	1	233	201	96
2	7	**Edmonton Oilers**	82	32	26	16	8	226	212	88
3	10	Vancouver Canucks	82	30	29	15	8	227	237	83
4	12	Calgary Flames	82	31	36	10	5	211	256	77

Pacific Division
No.	CR		GP	W	L	T	OTL	GF	GA	Pts
1	2	**Dallas Stars**	82	43	23	10	6	211	184	102
2	5	**Los Angeles Kings**	82	39	27	12	4	245	228	94
3	6	**Phoenix Coyotes**	82	39	31	8	4	232	228	90
4	8	**San Jose Sharks**	82	35	30	10	7	225	214	87
5	9	Mighty Ducks of Anaheim	82	34	33	12	3	217	227	83

Western Conference
R		Div	GP	W	L	T	OTL	GF	GA	Pts
**1**	**p – St. Louis Blues**	**CEN**	**82**	**51**	**19**	**11**	**1**	**248**	**165**	**114**
**2**	**y – Dallas Stars**	**PAC**	**82**	**43**	**23**	**10**	**6**	**211**	**184**	**102**
**3**	**y – Colorado Avalanche**	**NW**	**82**	**42**	**28**	**11**	**1**	**233**	**201**	**96**
**4**	**Detroit Red Wings**	**CEN**	**82**	**48**	**22**	**10**	**2**	**278**	**210**	**108**
**5**	**Los Angeles Kings**	**PAC**	**82**	**39**	**27**	**12**	**4**	**245**	**228**	**94**
**6**	**Phoenix Coyotes**	**PAC**	**82**	**39**	**31**	**8**	**4**	**232**	**228**	**90**
**7**	**Edmonton Oilers**	**NW**	**82**	**32**	**26**	**16**	**8**	**226**	**212**	**88**
**8**	**San Jose Sharks**	**PAC**	**82**	**35**	**30**	**10**	**7**	**225**	**214**	**87**
8.5
9	Mighty Ducks of Anaheim	PAC	82	34	33	12	3	217	227	83
10	Vancouver Canucks	NW	82	30	29	15	8	227	237	83
11	Chicago Blackhawks	CEN	82	33	37	10	2	242	245	78
12	Calgary Flames	NW	82	31	36	10	5	211	256	77
13	Nashville Predators	CEN	82	28	40	7	7	199	240	70

Divisions: CEN – Central, PAC – Pacific, NW – Northwest

bold – Qualified for playoffs; p – Won Presidents' Trophy; y – Won division

== Playoffs ==
=== Bracket ===
In each round, teams competed in a best-of-seven series following a 2–2–1–1–1 format (scores in the bracket indicate the number of games won in each best-of-seven series). The team with home ice advantage played at home for games one and two (and games five and seven, if necessary), and the other team played at home for games three and four (and game six, if necessary). The top eight teams in each conference made the playoffs, with the three division winners seeded 1–3 based on regular season record, and the five remaining teams seeded 4–8.

The NHL used "re-seeding" instead of a fixed bracket playoff system. During the first three rounds, the highest remaining seed in each conference was matched against the lowest remaining seed, the second-highest remaining seed played the second-lowest remaining seed, and so forth. The higher-seeded team was awarded home ice advantage. The two conference winners then advanced to the Stanley Cup Finals, where home ice advantage was awarded to the team that had the better regular season record.

Conference quarterfinals	Conference semifinals
1	Philadelphia	4
8	Buffalo	1
1	Philadelphia	4
7	Pittsburgh	2
2	Washington	1
7	Pittsburgh	4
Eastern Conference
3	Toronto	4
6	Ottawa	2
3	Toronto	2
4	New Jersey	4
4	New Jersey	4
5	Florida	0
1	St. Louis	3
8	San Jose	4
2	Dallas	4
8	San Jose	1
2	Dallas	4
7	Edmonton	1
Western Conference
3	Colorado	4
6	Phoenix	1
3	Colorado	4
4	Detroit	1
4	Detroit	4
5	Los Angeles	0

Conference finals
1	Philadelphia	3
4	New Jersey	4
2	Dallas	4
3	Colorado	3

Stanley Cup Final
E4	New Jersey	4
W2	Dallas	2

== Awards ==
The Roger Crozier Saving Grace Award was introduced this season for the goaltender with the best save percentage.

1999-2000 NHL awards
Award	Recipient(s)	Runner(s)-up/Finalists
Presidents' Trophy (Best regular-season record)	St. Louis Blues	Detroit Red Wings
Prince of Wales Trophy (Eastern Conference playoff champion)	New Jersey Devils	Philadelphia Flyers
Clarence S. Campbell Bowl (Western Conference playoff champion)	Dallas Stars	Colorado Avalanche
Art Ross Trophy (Player with most points)	Jaromir Jagr (Pittsburgh Penguins)	Pavel Bure (Florida Panthers)
Bill Masterton Memorial Trophy (Perseverance, Sportsmanship, and Dedication)	Ken Daneyko (New Jersey Devils)	N/A
Bud Light Plus-Minus Award (Best plus-minus statistic)	Chris Pronger (St. Louis Blues)	Chris Chelios (Detroit Red Wings)
Calder Memorial Trophy (Best first-year player)	Scott Gomez (New Jersey Devils)	Scott Gomez (New Jersey Devils); Brad Stuart (San Jose Sharks); Mike York (New York Rangers)
Conn Smythe Trophy (Most valuable player, playoffs)	Scott Stevens (New Jersey Devils)	N/A
Frank J. Selke Trophy (Defensive forward)	Steve Yzerman (Detroit Red Wings)	Michal Handzus (St. Louis Blues); Mike Ricci (San Jose Sharks); Steve Yzerman (Detroit Red Wings)
Hart Memorial Trophy (Most valuable player, regular season)	Chris Pronger (St. Louis Blues)	Pavel Bure (Florida Panthers); Jaromir Jagr (Pittsburgh Penguins); Chris Pronger (St. Louis Blues)
Jack Adams Award (Best coach)	Joel Quenneville (St. Louis Blues)	Joel Quenneville (St. Louis Blues); Alain Vigneault (Montreal Canadiens); Ron Wilson (Washington Capitals)
James Norris Memorial Trophy (Best defenceman)	Chris Pronger (St. Louis Blues)	Rob Blake (Los Angeles Kings); Nicklas Lidstrom (Detroit Red Wings); Chris Pronger (St. Louis Blues)
King Clancy Memorial Trophy (Leadership and humanitarian contribution)	Curtis Joseph (Toronto Maple Leafs)	N/A
Lady Byng Memorial Trophy (Sportsmanship and excellence)	Pavol Demitra (St. Louis Blues)	Pavol Demitra (St. Louis Blues); Nicklas Lidstrom (Detroit Red Wings); Teemu Selanne (Mighty Ducks of Anaheim)
Lester B. Pearson Award (Outstanding player)	Jaromir Jagr (Pittsburgh Penguins)	N/A
Maurice "Rocket" Richard Trophy (Top goal-scorer)	Pavel Bure (Florida Panthers)	Owen Nolan (San Jose Sharks)
NHL Foundation Player Award (Award for community enrichment)	Adam Graves (New York Rangers)	N/A
NHL Plus-Minus Award (Player with the best plus-minus)	Chris Pronger (St. Louis Blues)	Chris Chelios (Detroit Red Wings)
Roger Crozier Saving Grace Award (Best save percentage)	Ed Belfour (Dallas Stars)	Jose Theodore (Montreal Canadiens); Dominik Hasek (Buffalo Sabres)
Vezina Trophy (Best goaltender)	Olaf Kolzig (Washington Capitals)	Curtis Joseph (Toronto Maple Leafs); Olaf Kolzig (Washington Capitals); Roman Turek (St. Louis Blues)
William M. Jennings Trophy (Goaltender(s) of team with fewest goals against)	Roman Turek (St. Louis Blues)	N/A

=== All-Star teams ===
First team	Position	Second team
Olaf Kolzig, Washington Capitals	G	Roman Turek, St. Louis Blues
Chris Pronger, St. Louis Blues	D	Rob Blake, Los Angeles Kings
Nicklas Lidstrom, Detroit Red Wings	D	Eric Desjardins, Philadelphia Flyers
Steve Yzerman, Detroit Red Wings	C	Mike Modano, Dallas Stars
Jaromir Jagr, Pittsburgh Penguins	RW	Pavel Bure, Florida Panthers
Brendan Shanahan, Detroit Red Wings	LW	Paul Kariya, Mighty Ducks of Anaheim

== Player statistics ==
=== Scoring leaders ===
Note: GP = Games played; G = Goals; A = Assists; Pts = Points

Player	Team	GP	G	A	Pts
Jaromir Jagr	Pittsburgh Penguins	63	42	54	96
Pavel Bure	Florida Panthers	74	58	36	94
Mark Recchi	Philadelphia Flyers	82	28	63	91
Paul Kariya	Mighty Ducks of Anaheim	74	42	44	86
Teemu Selanne	Mighty Ducks of Anaheim	79	33	52	85
Owen Nolan	San Jose Sharks	78	44	40	84
Tony Amonte	Chicago Blackhawks	82	43	41	84
Mike Modano	Dallas Stars	77	38	43	81
Joe Sakic	Colorado Avalanche	60	28	53	81
Steve Yzerman	Detroit Red Wings	78	35	44	79

=== Leading goaltenders ===
Note: GP = Games played; Min = Minutes played; GA = Goals against; GAA = Goals against average; W = Wins; L = Losses; T = Ties; SO = Shutouts; SV% = Save percentage

Player	Team	GP	MIN	GA	GAA	W	L	T	SO	SV%
Brian Boucher	Philadelphia Flyers	35	2038	65	1.91	20	10	3	4	.903
Roman Turek	St. Louis Blues	67	3960	129	1.95	42	15	9	7	.912
Ed Belfour	Dallas Stars	62	3620	127	2.10	32	21	7	4	.919
Jose Theodore	Montreal Canadiens	30	1655	58	2.10	12	13	2	5	.919
John Vanbiesbrouck	Philadelphia Flyers	50	2950	108	2.20	25	15	9	3	.906
Dominik Hasek	Buffalo Sabres	35	2066	76	2.21	15	11	6	3	.919
Martin Brodeur	New Jersey Devils	72	4312	161	2.24	43	20	8	6	.910
Patrick Roy	Colorado Avalanche	63	3704	141	2.28	32	21	8	2	.914
Tommy Salo	Edmonton Oilers	70	4164	162	2.33	27	28	13	2	.914
Patrick Lalime	Ottawa Senators	38	2038	79	2.33	19	14	3	3	.905

Source: 2001 NHL Yearbook

== Coaches ==
=== Eastern Conference ===
- Atlanta Thrashers: Curt Fraser
- Boston Bruins: Pat Burns
- Buffalo Sabres: Lindy Ruff
- Carolina Hurricanes: Paul Maurice
- Florida Panthers: Terry Murray
- Montreal Canadiens: Alain Vigneault
- New Jersey Devils: Robbie Ftorek and Larry Robinson
- New York Islanders: Butch Goring
- New York Rangers: John Muckler and John Tortorella
- Ottawa Senators: Jacques Martin
- Philadelphia Flyers: Roger Neilson and Craig Ramsay
- Pittsburgh Penguins: Kevin Constantine and Herb Brooks
- Tampa Bay Lightning: Steve Ludzik
- Toronto Maple Leafs: Pat Quinn
- Washington Capitals: Ron Wilson

=== Western Conference ===
- Mighty Ducks of Anaheim: Craig Hartsburg
- Calgary Flames: Brian Sutter
- Chicago Blackhawks: Lorne Molleken and Bob Pulford
- Colorado Avalanche: Bob Hartley
- Dallas Stars: Ken Hitchcock
- Detroit Red Wings: Scotty Bowman
- Edmonton Oilers: Kevin Lowe
- Los Angeles Kings: Andy Murray
- Nashville Predators: Barry Trotz
- Phoenix Coyotes: Bobby Francis
- San Jose Sharks: Darryl Sutter
- St. Louis Blues: Joel Quenneville
- Vancouver Canucks: Marc Crawford

== Milestones ==
=== Debuts ===
The following is a list of players of note who played their first NHL game in 1999–2000 (listed with their first team, an asterisk(*) marks debut in playoffs):

- Patrik Stefan, Atlanta Thrashers
- Robyn Regehr, Calgary Flames
- Alex Tanguay, Colorado Avalanche
- Martin Skoula, Colorado Avalanche
- Brenden Morrow, Dallas Stars
- Brian Rafalski, New Jersey Devils
- Scott Gomez, New Jersey Devils
- Roberto Luongo, New York Islanders
- Brian Boucher, Philadelphia Flyers
- Simon Gagne, Philadelphia Flyers
- Evgeni Nabokov, San Jose Sharks
- Mike York, New York Rangers

=== Last games ===
The following is a list of players of note that played their last game in the NHL in 1999–2000 (listed with their last team):

- Marty McSorley, Boston Bruins
- Grant Fuhr, Calgary Flames
- Steve Smith, Calgary Flames
- Ed Olczyk, Chicago Blackhawks
- Brian Skrudland, Dallas Stars
- Guy Carbonneau, Dallas Stars
- Ken Wregget, Detroit Red Wings
- Bill Ranford, Edmonton Oilers
- Ray Sheppard, Florida Panthers
- Darren Turcotte, Nashville Predators
- Ulf Samuelsson, Philadelphia Flyers
- Zarley Zalapski, Philadelphia Flyers
- Rob Brown, Pittsburgh Penguins
- Pat Falloon, Pittsburgh Penguins
- Bob Rouse, San Jose Sharks
- Murray Craven, San Jose Sharks
- Dave Ellett, St. Louis Blues
- Geoff Courtnall, St. Louis Blues
- Derek King, St. Louis Blues
- Daren Puppa, Tampa Bay Lightning
- Shawn Burr, Tampa Bay Lightning
- Wendel Clark, Toronto Maple Leafs
- Doug Bodger, Vancouver Canucks

== Broadcasting ==
=== Canada ===
This was the second season of the league's Canadian national broadcast rights deals with CBC and CTV Sportsnet. CBC aired Saturday night Hockey Night in Canada regular season games, while CTV Sportsnet's telecasts included Tuesday Night Hockey and other weeknight games. Coverage of the Stanley Cup playoffs continued to primarily be on CBC, while CTV Sportsnet aired first round all-U.S. series.

=== United States ===
This was the first year of the league's five-year U.S. national broadcast rights deal with ESPN and ABC. Much like ABC's initial contract with the NHL in the 1992–93 and 1993–94 seasons, ESPN essentially purchased time on ABC to air selected NHL games on ist sister broadcast network. This was noted in copyright tags at the conclusion of the telecasts (i.e., "The preceding program has been paid for by ESPN, Inc."). ESPN later signed a similar television rights contract with the National Basketball Association in 2002, allowing it to produce and broadcast NBA games on ABC under a similar time buy arrangement on the broadcast network. ABC's terms of this deal included four to five weeks worth of regional games on selected Saturday afternoons, typically between beginning in January or March for the first two seasons. ABC also had the All-Star Game. ESPN and ESPN2 continued to air weeknight games throughout the regular season. During the first two rounds of the playoffs, ESPN and ESPN2 aired selected games, while ABC had weekend regional telecasts. Each U.S. team's regional broadcaster produced local coverage of first and second round games (except for those games on ABC). ABC's weekend telecasts continued into the Conference Finals, while ESPN had the rest of the third round games. ESPN then aired the first two games of the Stanley Cup Finals before the rest of the series shifted to ABC.

== See also ==
- List of Stanley Cup champions
- 1999 NHL entry draft
- 1999 NHL expansion draft
- 1999–2000 NHL transactions
- 50th National Hockey League All-Star Game
- NHL All-Star Game
- NHL All-Rookie Team
- Lester Patrick Trophy
- 1999 in sports
- 2000 in sports
