= Yankho Kamwendo =

Swedish TV personality and actor (born 1978)

- Born: Yankho Martin Kamwendo; 1 November 1978 (age 47); Malawi

Yankho Martin Kamwendo (born 1 November 1978) is a Swedish TV personality and actor.

Kamwendo is best known for his role as Lennart in the TV show Leende guldbruna ögon and hosting popular children's television shows Bolibompa and TV-skeppet. Kamwendo has also been featured in the popular live sing-along television show Allsång på Skansen. He has toured extensively with national theatre company the National Swedish Touring Theatre, performing the play Elddop. Kamwendo has also initiated a documentary about Malawian children who became orphans after losing their parents to HIV.

== Personal life ==
Yankho Kamwendo's father was born in Malawi and his mother hails from Sweden. Kamwendo lives in Hammarbyhöjden, Stockholm. He is an alpine skiing enthusiast and has been involved with missionary aid work in Africa.
