= Ann-Sofie Gälman =

Swedish television presenter and journalist

- Born: Risögrund, Kalix, Sweden
- Education: Umeå University; Kalix Folkhögskola (Journalism program)
- Occupations: Television presenter, journalist
- Employer: SVT
- Known for: Anchorwoman for Nordnytt; Co-host of SVT2's 2010 national election coverage
- Notable work: Nordnytt; Reagera

Ann-Sofie Gälman is a Swedish television presenter and journalist working for SVT2s daily news magazine Nordnytt, which covers Sweden's three most northern provinces.

Gälman grew up in the village of Risögrund outside Kalix and knew at an early age that she wanted to be a journalist. During her days in middle school she interned at the Nordnytt editorial. Gälman first attended Umeå University for a year before being accepted to the journalism program at Kalix Folkhögskola. Her first job after graduation was with news agency TT Spectra in Stockholm writing sport articles. She later got a job with Västerbottensnytt in Umeå covering local news, reporting from Björklöven and Luleå Hockeys home games and hosting the bate show Reagera

Today she is the anchorwoman for Nordnytt and has also co-hosted SVT2's coverage of the 2010 national election.
