= Cletus Nelson Nwadike =

Swedish-Nigerian poet and author

Cletus Nelson Nwadike, born 1966 is a Swedish-Nigerian poet and author.

He left Nigeria for Sweden in 1990 due to political reasons. He already spoke three languages (Ibo, Hausa and English) and embraced the new opportunity to learn another language by reading modern classical Swedish writers such as Pär Lagerkvist and Harry Martinson. After about 5 – 6 years in Sweden he found an urge to write poetry, in Swedish. He says he finds it hard to write in English, the language of the former colonial power. He never learned to write in the Ibo or Hausa languages. His main themes are love, death and Africa. He published his first poetry collection in 1998, En kort svart dikt (A Short Black Poem) and has since then published five more books. Nwadike has also contributed to periodicals and anthologies.

He has performed at various conventions and the rock festival Hultsfredsfestivalen. Nwadike as also been featured in the national radio program "Vid dagens slut".

== Personal life ==
After many years in the city of Malmö, he now resides in Aneby, rural Småland with his wife and children. He works at an after school center (Fritidspedagog) and has a Swedish university degree from Högskolan in Jönköping in creative writing.

== Books ==
- En kort svart dikt, (A Short Black Poem) 1998
- Med ord kan jag inte längre be, (With Words I Can No Longer Pray) 2000
- En sida av regnet som faller, (One Side of the Falling Rain) 2003
- Jag vill inte sörja dig, (I do not want to mourn You) 2007
- Tankar ur ett lejons gap, (Thoughts From the Jaws of a Lion) 2010
- Elefanten i spegeln (The Elephant in the Mirror) A children's book illustrated by Annelie Johansson.

== Honours ==
The Stiftelsen Familjen de Vylders Foundation for Immigrant writers award (2000)
