= Fredrik Oduya =

Swedish ice hockey player

- Born: May 31, 1975 Stockholm, Sweden
- Died: July 5, 2011 (aged 36) Vienna, Austria
- Height: 6 ft 3 in (191 cm)
- Weight: 218 lb (99 kg; 15 st 8 lb)
- Position: Defence
- Shot: Left
- Played for: Kansas City Blades; Kentucky Thoroughblades; Saint John Flames; Orlando Solar Bears; Edinburgh Capitals; Laredo Bucks; Nybro Vikings IF
- NHL draft: 154th overall, 1993; San Jose Sharks
- Playing career: 1995–2000; 2004–2007

Fredrik Oduya (May 31, 1975 – July 5, 2011) was a Swedish ice hockey player. He was drafted 154th overall by the San Jose Sharks in the 1993 NHL entry draft.

== Career ==
After the International Hockey League with the Kansas City Blades and the American Hockey League for the Kentucky Thoroughblades, Oduya was traded to the Calgary Flames in 1999 for Eric Landry. He never played in the National Hockey League, although he was part of both the San Jose Sharks and later the Calgary Flames organisations.

Known as a good fighter and tough hitter, Oduya was nicknamed "Freddy Knuckles" and "the Swedish Nightmare".

In 2000, he retired due to a back injury. He came out of retirement in 2004 to play in Sweden and Great Britain, before retiring again in 2007.

== Personal life ==
His father was originally from Kenya and was a member of the Luo ethnic group, who married a Swedish woman and they had two sons, Fredrik and Johnny Oduya. Both became professional ice hockey players who played for North American teams. Johnny has won two Stanley Cups with the Chicago Blackhawks.

After moving back to Stockholm, Fredrik studied law at Stockholm University.

Fredrik Oduya died in a motorcycle accident in the summer of 2011.
