= List of Nottingham Panthers seasons =

This is a list of seasons completed by the Nottingham Panthers ice hockey team currently of the British Elite League. This list documents the season-by-season records of the Nottingham Panthers from their inaugural season in 1946–47 to 1959–60 and from their reformation in 1980–81 to the present day. The Panthers were due to begin play in the 1939–40 season but the outbreak of World War II delayed this for seven years. The club played their first competitive game on 22 November 1946, defeating Wembley Monarchs 3-2 at the Ice Stadium.

They played in the English National League for their first eight seasons before becoming part of the amalgamated British National League in 1954. Following the collapse of the British National League in 1960 the Panthers were disbanded. The club were reformed in 1980 when the Sheffield Lancers relocated to Nottingham. Since that time the Panthers have played in the English League South, English National League, British Hockey League, Ice Hockey Superleague and the current Elite Ice Hockey League. A charter member of the Premier League in 1983 at the reintroduction of a national league, Nottingham have held continuous membership of the highest league since then and are the only team to have done so.

In their 60 completed seasons, the Panthers have been regular season champions 4 times, in 1950–51, 1953–54, 1955–56 and 2012–13. The team have won the playoff championship seven times, in 1988–89, 2006–07, 2010–11, 2011–12, 2012–13, 2015-16 and 2024-25 and appeared in 8 other playoff finals. They have 39 post season appearances, including 37 consecutively between 1985–86 and 2022-23. Nottingham have won the Autumn Cup 6 times, in 1955–56, 1986–87, 1991–92, 1994–95, 1996–97 and 1998–99 and 8 Challenge Cups in 2003–04, 2007–08, five in a row between 2009–10 and 2013-14, and 2015-16. In total the Panthers have appeared in 32 major finals, winning 20 of them. They have an overall regular season record of 1229 wins, 904 defeats, 127 ties and 116 overtime defeats.

Autumn Cup Winners	Regular Season Champions	Playoff Champions	Challenge Cup Winners	Finished bottom of standings

Season	League	Autumn Cup								Regular season									Postseason	Challenge Cup
Season	League	Finish	GP	W	L	T	GF	GA	Pts	Finish	GP	W	L	T	OTL	GF	GA	Pts	Postseason	Challenge Cup
1946–47	English League	Did not enter								7th	36	7	25	4	-	134	223	18	Did not qualify	
1947–48	English League	5th	10	5	5	0	43	46	10	6th	36	13	20	3	-	162	184	29		
1948–49	English League	5th	14	7	7	0	69	58	14	4th	28	12	11	5	-	122	126	29		
1949–50	English League	3rd	36	19	15	2	162	167	40	6th	24	10	13	1	-	126	151	21		
1950–51	English League	4th	30	12	11	7	148	134	31	1st	30	18	9	3	-	156	105	37		
1951–52	English League	2nd	30	17	12	1	153	139	35	6th	30	9	20	1	-	122	169	19		
1952–53	English League	4th	30	13	15	2	151	174	28	3rd	30	15	12	3	-	144	144	33		
1953–54	English League	5th	24	9	14	1	104	115	19	1st	24	15	5	4	-	136	106	34		
1954–55	British League	5th	22	9	9	4	111	95	22	2nd	40	25	10	5	-	224	152	55		
1955–56	British League	1st	24	16	6	2	124	93	34	1st	32	17	14	1	-	185	166	35		
1956–57	British League	5th	24	6	13	5	113	124	17	5th	32	10	18	4	-	131	173	24		
1957–58	British League	3rd	24	11	12	1	103	107	23	2nd	32	16	13	3	-	158	158	35		
1958–59	British League	5th	24	6	15	3	90	123	15	4th	30	9	16	5	-	124	146	23		
1959–60	British League	3rd	24	9	11	4	90	123	22	2nd	32	16	14	2	-	127	132	34	Won in Semi Final, 7-6 (Streatham); Lost in Final, 5-6 (Brighton)	
1960–80	The Panthers were disbanded in 1960 and were not reformed until 1980																			
1980–81	English League South									4th	14	5	6	3	-	75	75	17	Did not qualify	
1981–82	English League									2nd	14	9	5	0	-	85	82	18	Did not qualify	
1981–82	English League South									2nd	16	12	4	0	-	155	61	24	Did not qualify	
1982–83	British League B									4th	28	14	10	4	-	228	206	29	Did not qualify	
1983–84	Premier League	Finished second in qualifying group								8th	32	9	21	2	-	183	277	20	Did not qualify	
1984–85	Premier League	Finished third in qualifying group								8th	36	12	22	2	-	151	233	26	Did not qualify	
1985–86	Premier League	Finished first in qualifying group Lost in English Final, 8-16 (Durham)								6th	36	15	17	4	-	181	226	34	Finished third in qualifying group	
1986–87	Premier League	Finished first qualifying group Won in English Final, 15-9 (Whitley); Won Autumn Cup, 5-4 (Fife)								3rd	36	23	12	1	-	317	215	47	Finished third in qualifying group	
1987–88	Premier League	Finished second in qualifying group								6th	36	13	21	2	-	243	298	28	Finished third in qualifying group	
1988–89	Premier League	Finished third in qualifying group								3rd	36	22	9	5	-	305	193	49	Finished second in qualifying group Won in Semi Final, 8-6 (Whitley); Won British Championship, 6-3 (Ayr)	
1989–90	Premier League	Finished fourth in qualifying group								6th	32	12	18	2	-	183	185	26	Finished second in qualifying group Lost in Semi Final, 4-5 (Murrayfield)	
1990–91	Premier League	Finished second in qualifying group								6th	36	16	16	4	-	200	202	36	Finished fourth in qualifying group	
1991–92	Premier League	Finished first in qualifying group Won in Semi Final, 13-10 (Cardiff); Won Autumn Cup, 7-5 (Humberside)								2nd	36	21	12	3	-	238	192	45	Finished first in qualifying group Won in Semi Final, 7-3 (Peterborough); Lost in Final, 6-7 (Durham)	
1992–93	Premier League	Finished second in qualifying group Won in Quarter Final, 18-14 (Basingstoke); Lost in Semi Final, 7-15 (Cardiff)								3rd	36	19	15	2	-	256	236	40	Finished first in qualifying group Lost in Semi Final, 4-5 (Humberside)	
1993–94	Premier League	Finished first in qualifying group Won in Quarter Final, 6-5 (Basingstoke); Lost in Semi Final, 9-11 (Cardiff)								4th	44	26	16	2	-	288	224	54	Finished second in qualifying group Lost in Semi Final, 0-8 (Sheffield)	
1994–95	Premier League	Finished first in qualifying group Won in Quarter Final, 25-10 (Slough); Won in Semi Final, 25-11 (Murrayfield); Won Autumn Cup, 7-2 (Cardiff)								3rd	44	32	8	4	-	372	213	68	Finished second in qualifying group Lost in Semi Final, 7-11 (Murrayfield)	
1995–96	Premier League	Finished second in qualifying group Won in Quarter Final, 11-9 (Basingstoke); Won in Semi Final, 16-8 (Humberside); Lost in Final, 2-5 (Sheffield)								4th	36	19	12	5	-	214	174	43	Finished second in qualifying group Won in Semi Final, 3-1 (Durham); Lost in Final, 3-4 (Sheffield)	
1996–97	Super League	Finished second in qualifying group Won in Quarter Final, 5-4 (Cardiff); Won in Semi Final, 6-3 (Sheffield); Won Autumn Cup, 5-3 (Ayr)								4th	42	21	18	1	2	160	147	45	Finished first in qualifying group Won in Semi Final, 6-5 (Ayr); Lost in Final, 1-3 (Sheffield)	
1997–98	Super League	Finished second in qualifying group Lost in Quarter Finals, 5-8 (Ayr)								4th	28	14	11	3	0	95	99	31	Finished third in qualifying group	Finished fourth in qualifying group Lost in Semi Final, 8-16 (Ayr)
1998–99	Super League	Finished third in qualifying group Won in Second Round, 19-0 (Slough); Won in Quarter Final, 7-1 (Newcastle); Won in Semi Final, 5-4 (Manchester); Won Autumn Cup, 2-1 (Ayr)								3rd	42	25	14	1	2	140	134	53	Finished first in qualifying group Won in Semi Final, 4-2 (Bracknell); Lost in Final, 1-2 (Cardiff)	Finished second in qualifying group Won in Semi Final, 6-5 (Cardiff); Lost in Final, 0-4 (Sheffield)
1999–00	Super League	Finished fourth in qualifying group Won in Second Round, 5-3 (Peterborough); Lost in Quarter Final, 2-13 (Cardiff)								6th	42	18	20	3	1	140	165	40	Finished fourth in qualifying group	Finished fourth in qualifying group Won in Semi Final, 7-4 (London); Lost in Final, 1-2 (Sheffield)
2000–01	Super League	Finished third in qualifying group Won in Quarter Final, 7-4 (Manchester); Lost in Semi Final, 5-7 (Sheffield)								8th	48	18	23	-	7	126	167	53	Finished fourth in qualifying group	Finished fifth in qualifying group
2001–02	Super League									4th	48	19	20	9	-	140	141	47	Finished sixth in qualifying group	Finished second in qualifying group Lost in Semi Final, 4-7 (Ayr)
2002–03	Super League									3rd	32	15	13	4	0	92	92	34	Finished third in qualifying group Lost in Semi Final, 3-4 (London)	Finished first in qualifying group Won in Semi Final, 3-2 (Belfast); Lost in Final, 2-3 (Sheffield)
2003–04	Elite League									2nd	56	34	14	6	2	209	158	76	Finished first in qualifying group Won in Semi Final, 6-1 (Manchester); Lost in Final, 1-2 (Sheffield)	Finished fourth in qualifying group Won in Semi Final, 11-5 (Belfast); Won Challenge Cup, 4-3 (Sheffield)
2004–05	Elite League									4th	50	25	14	5	6	136	101	61	Finished second in qualifying group Won in Semi Final, 3-1 (Cardiff); Lost in Final, 1-2 (Coventry)	Finished second in qualifying group Lost in Semi Final, 4-5 (Coventry)
2005–06	Elite League									3rd	42	23	11	6	2	111	88	54	Finished third in qualifying group	Finished first in qualifying group Lost in Semi Final, 7-8 (Coventry)
2006–07	Elite League									5th	54	29	17	-	8	182	149	66	Won in Quarter Final, 6-5 (Sheffield); Won in Semi Final, 2-1 (Belfast); Won British Championship, 2-1 (Cardiff)	Lost in Quarter Final, 4-5 (Sheffield)
2007–08	Elite League									3rd	54	33	18	-	3	173	133	69	Lost in Quarter Final, 6-7 (Cardiff)	Finished first in qualifying group Won in Semi Final, 10-5 (Newcastle); Won Challenge Cup, 9-7 (Sheffield)
2008–09	Elite League									3rd	54	37	13	-	4	225	153	72	Won in Quarter Final, 9-5 (Manchester); Won in Semi Final, 6-2 (Coventry); Lost in Final, 0-2 (Sheffield)	Finished third in qualifying group.
2009–10	Elite League									3rd	56	34	20	-	2	215	177	70	Won in Quarter Final, 9-4 (Edinburgh); Lost in Semi Final, 1-2 (Belfast)	Finished first in qualifying group Won in Semi Final, 7-3 (Sheffield); Won Challenge Cup, 8-7 (Cardiff)
2010–11	Elite League									4th	54	33	16	-	5	260	179	72	Won in Quarter Final, 8–4 (Braehead); Won in Semi Final, 4–3 (Sheffield); Won British Championship, 5–4 (Cardiff)	Finished first in qualifying group Won in Semi Final, 18–4 (Newcastle); Won Challenge Cup, 4–3 (Belfast)
2011–12	Elite League									3rd	54	38	12	-	4	241	129	80	Won in Quarter Final, 5–4 (Braehead); Won in Semi Final, 10–4 (Hull); Won British Championship, 2–0 (Cardiff)	Finished first in qualifying group Won in Semi Final, 5–3 (Braehead); Won Challenge Cup, 10–4 (Belfast)
2012–13	Elite League									1st	52	42	9	-	1	232	111	85	Won in Quarter Final, 5–4 (Fife); Won in Semi Final, 6–3 (Cardiff); Won British Championship, 3–2 (Belfast)	Finished second in qualifying group Won in Semi Final, 9–4 (Belfast); Won Challenge Cup, 5–3 (Sheffield)
2013–14	Elite League									4th	52	25	20	-	7	188	169	57	Lost in Quarter Final, 1–9 (Braehead)	Finished first in qualifying group Won in Semi Final, 11–7 (Sheffield); Won Challenge Cup, 7–6 (Belfast)
2014–15	Elite League									4th	52	29	16	-	7	166	141	65	Lost in Quarter Final, 4–5 (Coventry)	Finished third in qualifying group Won in Quarter Final, 11-8 (Fife); Lost in Semi Final, 7-8 (Sheffield)
2015–16	Elite League									5th	52	30	20	-	2	185	152	62	Won in Quarter Final, 7–4 (Belfast); Won in Semi Final, 4-1 (Fife); Won British Championship, 2-0 (Coventry)	Finished third in qualifying group Won in Semi Final, 10-0 (Sheffield); Won Challenge Cup, 1-0 (Cardiff)
2016–17	Elite League									4th	52	26	20	-	6	169	175	58	Lost in Quarter Final, 6-7 (Sheffield)	Finished second in qualifying group Won in Quarter Final, 6-4 (Braehead); Lost in Semi Final, 1-5 (Sheffield)
2017–18	Elite League									4th	56	33	18	-	5	203	177	71	Won in Quarter Final, 8-7 (Belfast); Lost in Semi Final, 4-5 (Sheffield)	Finished second in qualifying group Won in Quarter Final, 7-4 (Milton Keynes); Lost in Semi Final, 7-12 (Belfast)
2018–19	Elite League									3rd	60	29	19	-	12	183	181	70	Won in Quarter Final, 6-3 (Fife); Lost in Semi Final, 4-9 (Cardiff)	Finished first in qualifying group Won in Quarter Final, 8-5 (Manchester); Lost in Semi Final, 3-8 (Guildford)
2019–20	Elite League									5th	46	27	15	-	4	147	124	58	Cancelled due to the COVID-19 pandemic	Finished second in qualifying group Won in Quarter Final, 8-6 (Guildford); Lost in Semi Final, 8-9 (Cardiff)
2021–22	Elite League									4th	54	25	24	-	5	163	191	55	Lost in Quarter Final, 6-7 (Guildford)	Finished second in qualifying group Won in Quarter Final, 6-5 (Guildford); Lost in Semi Final, 1-2 (Belfast)
2022–23	Elite League									7th	54	21	28	-	5	149	191	47	Won in Quarter Final, 7-6 (Guildford); Lost in Semi Final, 3-6 (Belfast)	Finished second in qualifying group Lost in Quarter Final, 5-7 (Belfast)
2023–24	Elite League									9th	54	21	23	-	8	165	195	50	Finished ninth in qualifying group	Finished third in qualifying group
2024–25	Elite League									3rd	54	34	14	-	6	182	120	74	Won in Quarter Final, 8-6 (Guildford) Won in Semi Final, 4-3 (Sheffield) Won British Championship, 4-3 OT2 (Cardiff)	Finished in third qualifying group Won in Pay-in game, 5-1 (Glasgow) Lost in Semi Final, 2-3 (Belfast)
2025–26	Elite League									3rd	54	33	15	-	6	186	145	72	Lost in Quarter Final, 6-5 OT (Manchester)	Finished in third qualifying group Won in Pay-in game, 4-1 (Glasgow) Won in Semi Final, 5-4 OT (Sheffield); Won Challenge Cup, 3-2 OT (Coventry)
Regular season totals										--	2432	1262	919	127	122	10688	9711	2732	4 regular season titles	
