= 1979–80 British Ice Hockey season =

- Sport: ice hockey

Seasons
- ← 1978–79 1980–81 →

The 1979–80 British Ice Hockey season featured the Northern League, the Inter-City League and English League North.

Murrayfield Racers won the Northern League, Liverpool Leopards won the English League North and Richmond Flyers won the Inter-City League. Murrayfield Racers won the Icy Smith Cup.

== Icy Smith Cup ==
=== Final ===
Murrayfield Racers defeated Solihull Barons 21-2

== Autumn Cup ==
=== First round ===
==== Scottish section ====
	Club	GP	W	L	T	GF	GA	Pts
1.	Murrayfield Racers	8	5	2	1	43	22	11
2.	Glasgow Dynamos	8	5	3	0	35	31	10
3.	Fife Flyers	8	4	4	0	41	29	8
4.	Ayr Bruins	8	3	4	1	32	55	7
5.	Aviemore Blackhawks	8	2	6	0	38	52	4

==== English section ====
	Club	GP	W	L	T	GF	GA	Pts
1.	Billingham Bombers	6	6	0	0	52	23	12
2.	Durham Wasps	6	4	2	0	32	30	8
3.	Whitley Warriors	6	2	4	0	34	38	4
4.	Sunderland Chiefs	6	0	6	0	28	55	0

=== Playoffs ===
Semifinals

- Billingham Bombers - Glasgow Dynamos 6:3, 7:2
- Murrayfield Racers - Durham Wasps 6:3, 1:0

Final

- Murrayfield Racers - Billingham Bombers 10:1, 13:6
