= 1981–82 British Ice Hockey season =

- Sport: ice hockey

Seasons
- ← 1980–81 1982–83 →

The 1981–82 British Ice Hockey season featured the Northern League, the Inter-City League and English League North.

Dundee Rockets won the Northern League, Blackpool Seagulls won the English League North and Streatham Redskins won the Inter-City League. Murrayfield Racers won the British Championship.

== British Championship ==
=== Semi-finals ===
- Streatham Redskins bt Murrayfield Racers 9-5
- Dundee Rockets bt Blackpool Seagulls 16-4

=== Final ===
- Dundee Rockets bt Streatham Redskins 3-2

== Ben Truman Southern Cup ==
=== Results ===
	Club	GP	W	L	T	GF	GA	Pts
1.	Streatham Redskins	10	10	0	0	110	11	20
2.	Nottingham Panthers	10	8	2	0	127	29	16
3.	Solihull Barons	10	5	5	0	36	79	10
4.	Richmond Flyers	10	3	6	1	40	72	7
5.	Southampton Vikings	10	2	7	1	41	109	5
6.	Avon Arrows	10	2	8	0	35	89	4

== Autumn Cup ==
=== Results ===
Quarterfinals

- Billingham Bombers 6 - Durham Wasps' 7 (OT)
- Fife Flyers 7 - Glasgow Dynamos 6
- Dundee Rockets' 14 - Ayr Bruins 2
- Whitley Warriors 3 - Murrayfield Racers 11

Semifinals

- Durham Wasps 9 - Fife Flyers 4
- Dundee Rockets 9 - Murrayfield Racers 8

Final

- Durham Wasps - Dundee Rockets 4:7, 7:8
