= 1980–81 British Ice Hockey season =

- Sport: ice hockey

Seasons
- ← 1979–80 1981–82 →

The 1980–81 British Ice Hockey season featured the Northern League, the Inter-City League and English League North.

Murrayfield Racers won the Northern League, Blackpool Seagulls won the English League North and Streatham Redskins won the Inter-City League. Murrayfield Racers won the Icy Smith Cup.

== Icy Smith Cup ==
=== Final ===
Murrayfield Racers defeated Streatham Redskins 8-4

== Spring Cup ==
Semifinals

- Murrayfield Racers - Fife Flyers 7:5, 8:3
- Billingham Bombers - Durham Wasps 11:5, 6:4

Final

- The final between the Murrayfield Racers and the Billingham Bombers was not contested.

== Southern Cup ==
=== Results ===
	Club	GP	W	L	T	GF	GA	Pts
1.	Streatham Redskins	10	10	0	0	87	17	20
2.	Richmond Flyers	10	7	3	0	42	31	14
3.	Southampton Vikings	10	5	5	0	46	47	10
4.	Nottingham Panthers	10	5	5	0	48	45	10
5.	Solihull Barons	10	3	7	0	30	51	6
6.	Avon Arrows	10	0	10	0	20	82	0
