= 1978–79 British Ice Hockey season =

- Sport: ice hockey

Seasons
- ← 1977–78 1979–80 →

The 1978–79 British Ice Hockey season featured the Northern League for teams from Scotland and the north of England. A new format was introduced to replace the Southern League for teams from the rest of England. It consisted of two leagues called the Inter-City League and English League North.

Murrayfield Racers won the Northern League, Sheffield Lancers won the English League North and Streatham Redskins won the Inter-City League. Murrayfield Racers won the Icy Smith Cup.

== Icy Smith Cup ==
=== Final ===
Murrayfield Racers defeated Streatham Redskins at Billingham Ice Rink 10–2

== Autumn Cup ==
=== First round ===
==== Group 1 ====
| | Club | GP | W | L | T | GF | GA | Pts |
|---|---|---|---|---|---|---|---|---|
| 1. | Murrayfield Racers | 6 | 6 | 0 | 0 | 42 | 16 | 12 |
| 2. | Whitley Warriors | 6 | 2 | 3 | 1 | 24 | 25 | 5 |
| 3. | Billingham Bombers | 6 | 2 | 3 | 1 | 25 | 32 | 5 |
| 4. | Glasgow Dynamos | 6 | 1 | 5 | 0 | 19 | 37 | 2 |

==== Group 2 ====
| | Club | GP | W | L | T | GF | GA | Pts |
|---|---|---|---|---|---|---|---|---|
| 1. | Fife Flyers | 6 | 5 | 0 | 1 | 64 | 23 | 11 |
| 2. | Durham Wasps | 6 | 2 | 2 | 2 | 21 | 23 | 6 |
| 3. | Ayr Bruins | 6 | 2 | 4 | 0 | 28 | 52 | 4 |
| 4. | Sunderland Chiefs | 6 | 1 | 4 | 1 | 31 | 46 | 3 |

=== Playoffs ===
==== Semifinals ====
- Durham Wasps - Murrayfield Racers 5:8 on aggregate (3:3, 3:5)
- Whitley Warriors - Fife Flyers 9:14 on aggregate (4:6, 5:8)

==== Final ====
- Murrayfield Racers - Fife Flyers 8:15 on aggregate (4:3, 4:12)
