= 1979–80 Inter-City League season =

The 1979–80 Inter-City League season was the second season of the Inter-City League, the top level ice hockey league in southern England. Nine teams participated in the league, and the Richmond Flyers won the championship. The games played by the Universities of Cambridge and Oxford were counted double. (One win/loss is equivalent to two wins/losses.)

== Regular season ==
	Club	GP	W	T	L	GF–GA	Pts
1.	Richmond Flyers	16	13	0	3	83:49	26
2.	Southampton Vikings	16	10	3	3	79:62	23
3.	Streatham Redskins	16	11	0	5	77:46	22
4.	Solihull Barons	16	11	0	5	80:52	22
5.	Altrincham Aces	16	8	2	6	37:59	18
6.	Avon Arrows	16	8	1	7	54:49	17
7.	Sheffield Lancers	16	3	2	11	60:94	8
8.	Cambridge University	16	2	0	14	18:55	4
9.	Oxford University	16	2	0	14	28:50	4

== Playoffs ==
	Club	GP	W	T	L	GF–GA	Pts
1.	Richmond Flyers	3	2	1	0	22:11	5
1.	Southampton Vikings	3	2	1	0	18:10	5
3.	Solihull Barons	3	1	0	2	11:21	2
4.	Streatham Redskins	3	0	0	3	3:12	0

=== Final ===
- Southampton Vikings - Richmond Flyers 6:10
