= Mike Urquhart =

Canadian ice hockey player, coach and general manager (1958–2023)

- Born: April 9, 1958 Toronto, Ontario, Canada
- Died: December 9, 2023 (aged 65) Nottingham, England
- Height: 5 ft 11 in (180 cm)
- Position: Left wing
- Shot: Left
- Played for: Nottingham Panthers; Oxford City Stars; Cardiff Devils; Chelmsford Chieftains; Guildford Flames; Bracknell Bees; Milton Keynes Kings
- Playing career: 1983–1996

Mike Urquhart (April 9, 1958 – December 9, 2023) was a Canadian ice hockey player, coach and general manager. He played junior hockey with the Kamloops Chiefs of the Western Hockey League. He played professionally in the United Kingdom for the Nottingham Panthers, Oxford City Stars, Cardiff Devils, Chelmsford Chieftains, Guildford Flames, Bracknell Bees and Milton Keynes Kings.

Following his playing career, Urquhart was a head coach for Livingston Kings in Scotland, and he was also assistant coach of the Guildford Flames, general manager and head coach of the Nottingham Lions, coach of the Nottingham Leopards and head coach of the Nottingham Tigers during the 1980s and 2000s. Internationally, he coached the Great Britain men's national ice hockey team seniors, under-18 and under-20 teams. He was inducted into the British Ice Hockey Hall of Fame in 2007.

Urquhart died in Nottingham on December 9, 2023, at the age of 65.

== Career statistics ==
			Regular season					Playoffs
Season	Team	League	GP	G	A	Pts	PIM	GP	G	A	Pts	PIM
1973–74	Kamloops Chiefs	WCHL	1	0	0	0	0	—	—	—	—	—
1974–75	Kamloops Chiefs	WCHL	4	0	1	1	0	2	0	0	0	0
1974–75	Langley Lords	BCJHL	—	4	6	10	—	—	—	—	—	—
1975–76	Kamloops Chiefs	WCHL	67	5	10	15	28	12	1	0	1	10
1976–77	Flin Flon Bombers	WCHL	3	1	0	1	5	—	—	—	—	—
1976–77	Kamloops Chiefs	WCHL	4	0	0	0	7	—	—	—	—	—
1976–77	Calgary Centennials	WCHL	34	3	3	6	17	—	—	—	—	—
1982–83	Nottingham Panthers	BHL	25	18	26	44	82	—	—	—	—	—
1983–84	Nottingham Panthers	BHL	26	26	34	60	46	—	—	—	—	—
1984–85	Nottingham Panthers	BHL	3	0	3	3	4	—	—	—	—	—
1985–86	Nottingham Panthers	BHL	34	7	41	48	64	4	1	3	4	2
1986–87	Oxford City Stars	BD1	15	13	15	28	26	—	—	—	—	—
1986–87	Cardiff Devils	BD2	7	22	29	51	6	2	0	7	7	4
1987–88	Chelmsford Chieftains	BD2	26	50	50	100	52	—	—	—	—	—
1988–89	Chelmsford Chieftains	BD2	13	23	16	39	6	—	—	—	—	—
1990–91	Chelmsford Chieftains	BD2	24	17	39	56	44	—	—	—	—	—
1992–93	Guildford Flames	BD2	28	7	8	15	39	—	—	—	—	—
1993–94	Guildford Flames	BD1	32	10	15	25	36	—	—	—	—	—
1994–95	Bracknell Bees	BHL	6	0	0	0	6	—	—	—	—	—
1995–96	Milton Keynes Kings	BHL	34	1	2	3	0	—	—	—	—	—
BHL totals			128	52	106	158	202	8	1	3	4	2
