= 1980–81 English League North season =

English Hockey League Season

The 1980–81 English League North season was the third season of the English League North (known as the Southern League (Midland) until 1981), the top level ice hockey league in northern England. Seven teams participated in the league, and the Blackpool Seagulls won the championship and qualified for the semifinals of the British Championship as a result.

== Regular season ==
	Club	GP	W	T	L	GF–GA	Pts
1.	Blackpool Seagulls	12	11	1	0	102:24	23
2.	Liverpool Leopards	12	8	1	3	93:46	17
3.	Grimsby Buffaloes	12	7	1	4	70:72	15
4.	Deeside Dragons	12	4	1	7	45:68	9
5.	Sheffield Sabres	12	3	2	7	34:72	8
6.	Bradford Bulldogs	12	3	0	9	46:88	6
7.	Sunderland Chiefs	12	3	0	9	43:63	6
