= 1978–79 Inter-City League season =

The 1978–79 Inter-City League season was the first season of the Inter-City League, the top level ice hockey league in southern England. Eight teams participated in the league, and the Streatham Redskins won the championship. The top four teams qualified for the British Championship. The games played by Oxford University were counted double. (One win/loss is equivalent to two wins/losses.)

== Regular season ==
	Club	GP	W	T	L	GF–GA	Pts
1.	Streatham Redskins	14	10	2	2	63:28	22
2.	Altrincham Aces	14	10	2	2	70:33	22
3.	Solihull Barons	14	8	1	5	60:43	17
4.	Avon Arrows	14	6	4	4	66:52	16
5.	Southampton Vikings	14	7	2	5	69:50	16
6.	Oxford University	14	4	2	8	44:60	10
7.	Richmond Flyers	14	2	1	11	40:79	5
8.	Streatham Hawks	14	2	0	12	27:94	4
