= 1981–82 English League North season =

- Teams: 9

Final positions
- Champions: Blackpool Seagulls

The 1981–82 English League North season was the fourth and last season of the English League North, the top level ice hockey league in northern England. It was known as the Southern League (Midland) until 1981. Nine teams participated in the league, and the Blackpool Seagulls won the championship. The games played by the London All-Stars were counted double. (One win/loss is equivalent to two wins/losses.)

== Regular season ==
	Club	GP	W	T	L	GF–GA	Pts
1.	Blackpool Seagulls	16	15	0	1	131:60	30
2.	Sunderland Chiefs	16	14	0	2	195:48	28
3.	Grimsby Buffaloes	16	10	1	5	92:53	21
4.	Streatham Bruins	16	8	1	7	49:67	17
5.	Liverpool Leopards	16	7	1	8	81:93	15
6.	Sheffield Sabres	16	5	3	8	69:103	13
7.	Deeside Dragons	16	5	1	10	66:112	11
8.	Bradford Bulldogs	16	4	1	11	40:122	9
9.	London All-Stars	16	0	0	16	7:72	0
