= 1981–82 English League South season =

The 1981–82 English League South season was the fourth and last season of the English League South (also known as the Inter-City League), the top level ice hockey league in southern England. Nine teams participated in the league, and the Streatham Redskins won the championship. The games played by the Universities of Cambridge and Oxford were counted double. (One win/loss is equivalent to two wins/losses.)

== Regular season ==
	Club	GP	W	T	L	GF–GA	Pts
1.	Streatham Redskins	16	16	0	0	162:20	32
2.	Nottingham Panthers	16	13	0	3	148:53	26
3.	Southampton Vikings	16	9	0	7	72:115	18
4.	Solihull Barons	16	9	0	7	48:75	18
5.	Altrincham Aces	16	8	0	8	68:64	16
6.	Richmond Flyers	16	7	1	8	40:59	15
7.	Avon Arrows	16	7	1	8	63:83	15
8.	Oxford University	16	2	0	14	29:84	4
9.	Cambridge University	16	0	0	16	20:97	0

== Playoffs ==
=== Semifinals ===
- Streatham Redskins - Solihull Barons 23:1
- Nottingham Panthers - Southampton Vikings 9:3

=== Final ===
- Streatham Redskins - Nottingham Panthers 5:1
