= 1978–79 English League North season =

The 1978–79 English League North season was the first season of the English League North (known as the Southern League (Midland) until 1981), the top level ice hockey league in northern England. Five teams participated in the league with the Sheffield Lancers winning the first year's championship.

== Regular season ==
	Club	GP	W	T	L	GF–GA	Pts
1.	Sheffield Lancers	16	11	0	5	78:58	22
2.	Blackpool Seagulls	16	10	1	5	68:41	21
3.	Grimsby Buffaloes	16	10	0	6	47:28	20
4.	Liverpool Leopards	16	5	0	11	40:79	10
5.	Deeside Dragons	16	3	1	12	55:82	7
