= 1980–81 English League South season =

The 1980–81 English League South season was the third season of the English League South (also known as the Inter-City League), the top level ice hockey league in southern England. Nine teams participated in the league, and the Streatham Redskins won the championship. They qualified for the semifinals of the British Championship by virtue of finishing first in the regular season. The games played by the Universities of Cambridge and Oxford were counted double. (One win/loss is equivalent to two wins/losses.)

== Regular season ==
	Club	GP	W	T	L	GF–GA	Pts
1.	Streatham Redskins	16	16	0	0	126:22	32
2.	Richmond Flyers	16	12	1	3	91:34	25
3.	Southampton Vikings	16	9	2	5	77:68	20
4.	Nottingham Panthers	16	7	3	6	75:75	17
5.	Altrincham Aces	16	8	0	8	46:64	16
6.	Solihull Barons	16	7	0	9	45:79	14
7.	Avon Arrows	16	6	0	10	49:69	12
8.	Cambridge University	16	2	0	14	19:65	4
9.	Oxford University	16	2	0	14	28:80	4

== Playoffs ==
=== Semifinals ===
- Streatham Redskins - Nottingham Panthers 3:0
- Richmond Flyers - Southampton Vikings 7:0

=== Final ===
- Streatham Redskins - Richmond Flyers 6:2
