= 1982–83 BHL season =

- Sport: ice hockey

Seasons
- ← 1981–82 1983–84 →

The 1982–83 British Hockey League season was the inaugural season of the British Hockey League.

Fifteen teams from the Northern League, English League North and the English League South took part.

== League ==
The league was divided into three sections of five teams. Teams in section B played every team once at home and once away while teams in section A and C played teams in their own section four times and the teams from section B twice. Teams in section A did not play teams from section C. This meant that while section A and C teams played 26 games, section B teams played 28. Murrayfield, Glasgow, Durham, Crowtree and Richmond all had games voided.

=== Section A ===
Scotland	GP	W	T	L	GF	GA	Pts
Dundee Rockets	26	22	1	3	280	100	45
Murrayfield Racers*	24	16	2	6	181	124	34
Fife Flyers	26	10	3	13	162	187	23
Glasgow Dynamos*	25	3	1	23	80	228	7
Ayr Bruins	26	3	1	22	118	270	7

*Murrayfield two games void, Glasgow one game void

=== Section B ===
England	GP	W	T	L	GF	GA	Pts
Durham Wasps*	27	23	0	4	225	103	46
Cleveland Bombers	28	20	1	7	264	135	41
Streatham Redskins	28	19	2	7	239	107	40
Nottingham Panthers	28	14	4	10	228	140	32
Whitley Warriors	28	13	3	12	224	206	29

*One game void

=== Section C ===
England	GP	W	T	L	GF	GA	Pts
Altrincham Aces	26	16	3	7	170	125	35
Blackpool Seagulls	26	15	1	10	194	145	31
Southampton Vikings	26	5	1	20	108	233	11
Crowtree Chiefs*	25	4	1	20	120	221	9
Richmond Flyers*	25	2	0	23	57	326	4

*One game void

== Playoffs ==
=== English Semi-final ===
Section B Runner-up (Cleveland) vs Section A Winner (Altrincham)

- Cleveland Bombers 21-10 Altrincham Aces
- Altrincham Aces 5-4 Cleveland Bombers (Cleveland win 26–14 on aggregate)

=== English Final ===
In the English Final the winner of the semi-final took on the winner of Section B in a best of three series. In games one and two, the winning side was awarded one point while the winner of game three was awarded two points. The overall winner qualified for the British final.

Section B Winner (Durham) vs English Semi-final Winner (Cleveland)

- Cleveland Bombers 3-10 Durham Wasps
- Durham Wasps 11-4 Cleveland Bombers
- Durham Wasps 8-2 Cleveland Bombers

English Final	GP	W	T	L	GF	GA	Pts
Durham Wasps	3	3	0	0	26	9	4
Cleveland Bombers	3	0	0	3	9	26	0

=== Scottish Final ===
Section A Winner (Dundee) vs Section A Runner-up (Murrayfield)

- Dundee Rockets 7-8 Murrayfield Racers
- Murrayfield Racers 1-5 Dundee Rockets (Dundee win 12–9 on aggregate)

== British Championship Final ==
The final was between the winner of the English and Scottish finals. It was a one-off game played at Streatham Ice Rink.

- Dundee Rockets 6-2 Durham Wasps

Preceded by 1981-82 British Ice Hockey season	BHL seasons	Succeeded by 1983–84 BHL season
