= Fylde Flyers =

Ice hockey team in Lancashire, England

- City: Cleveleys, Lancashire
- League: English National Ice Hockey League
- Conference: North
- Division: Two
- Founded: 2011
- Operated: 2011-2013
- Home arena: Sub Zero Ice Rink
- Colours: tangerine, black, white
- Owner: Sub Zero Leisure Ltd
- General manager: Mick Caunce
- Head coach: Mark Gillingham Peter Bleackley Garry Fearon
- Website: www.FyldeFlyers.co.uk

Fylde Flyers were an English ice hockey team based in Cleveleys, Lancashire founded in 2011. They play in the English National Ice Hockey League, North Two. Home games are played at the Sub Zero Ice Rink, Cleveleys. The team lasted for only 2 seasons due to the small nature of their home rink at Cleveleys leading to the inability to attract players that would allow them to be competitive.

== History ==
The Fylde coast had been without an ice hockey team since the demise of Blackpool Seagulls in 1993. In July 2011 it was announced that Fylde Flyers were to begin playing at the recently opened Sub Zero Ice Rink in Cleveleys and would compete in their inaugural season in the English National Ice Hockey League, North Two division. The team included former HK Prizma Riga player Elvis Veldze who has represented Latvia at under-20 level. The current captain is Wayne Whitby Their first ever game was a 4–0 victory over Lancashire Raptors at Blackburn Arena on 10 September 2011. The first home game was a 9–4 win over Bradford Bulldogs on 10 December 2011.

The Flyers finished the 2011–12 season in 6th place with back-to-back victories: 9–3 over Hull Stingrays at home on 14 April 2012, and then 7–0 over Lancashire Raptors at Blackburn Ice Arena the following day. All-time top points scorer #77 Bobby Caunce Currently with Blackburn Hawks with 45 goals 52 Assist 97 points in 50 games over the two seasons. All-time top penalty minutes #8 Anthony Melbourne currently with Blackpool Seagulls with 209 mins in 51 games played over the two seasons.

== Current squad ==
Goaltenders
Number		Player	Catches	Born
32	(England)	Stephen Gilmartin		Fleetwood, England
39	(England)	Samuel Heyes		Blackrod, England
?	(England)	Lewis McBride		Altrincham, England

Defencemen
Number		Player	Shoots	Born
4	(England)	Daniel Bracegirdle		Poulton-le-Fylde, England
11	(England)	Wayne Whitby		Blackpool, England
19	(England)	Matthew Gibson		Great Harwood, England
21	(England)	Joseph Hall
23	(England)	Daniel Fearon		Blackpool, England
41	(England)	Chris Wells
44	(England)	Jack Jones		Blackpool, England
69	(England)	Chris Butcher

Forwards
Number		Player	Shoots	Born
3	(England)	Andrew Clark		Fleetwood, England
7	(England)	Mark Gillingham		Blackpool, England
8	(England)	Antony Melbourne		Blackpool, England
33	(England)	Danny Jones		Blackpool, England
68	(England)	Joe Charlton		Blackpool, England
9	(England)	Sam Chaddock		Warrington, Lancashire
10	(England)	Kurtis Hall		Blackpool, England
14	(Republic of Ireland)	Stewart Marriott		Belfast, Northern Ireland
15	(England)	Tom Murphy		Blackpool, England
16	(England)	Richard Hulme		Blackpool, England
40	(Latvia)	Elvis Veldze		Latvia
81	(Latvia)	Janis Grinbergs		Latvia
77	(England)	Bobby Caunce		Blackpool, England
?	(England)	Bradley Valentine		Manchester, England
?	(England)
