= 1979–80 English League North season =

Second season of English League North

The 1979–80 English League North season was the second season of the English League North (known as the Southern League (Midland) until 1981), the top level ice hockey league in northern England. Five teams participated in the league, and the Liverpool Leopards won the championship.

== Regular season ==
	Club	GP	W	T	L	GF–GA	Pts
1.	Liverpool Leopards	8	8	0	0	55:14	16
2.	Blackpool Seagulls	8	4	1	3	65:27	9
3.	Grimsby Buffaloes	8	4	0	4	53:37	8
4.	Deeside Dragons	8	3	1	4	47:29	7
5.	Sheffield Knights	8	0	0	8	3:116	0
