= English National League (1981–82) =

Ice hockey league

The English National League was an ice hockey league in England that existed only for the 1981-82 season. It was the first national league contested in England since the old English National League was held in 1954. It was made up of teams from the Northern League, the English League North, and the English League South. Eight teams participated in the league, and the Streatham Redskins won the championship.

== Regular season ==
	Club	GP	W	T	L	GF	GA	Pts
1.	Streatham Redskins	14	9	2	3	105	52	20
2.	Nottingham Panthers	14	9	0	5	87	82	18
3.	Whitley Warriors	14	8	1	5	101	75	17
4.	Billingham Bombers	14	8	1	5	98	74	17
5.	Blackpool Seagulls	14	8	0	6	118	118	16
6.	Durham Wasps	14	6	2	6	96	82	14
7.	Sunderland Chiefs	14	3	0	11	90	132	6
8.	Altrincham Aces	14	2	0	12	50	130	4
