= Liverpool Leopards =

- City: Liverpool, England
- Founded: 1948
- Operated: 1948-55 & 1973-82
- Folded: 1982
- Home arena: Palace Ice Rink, Liverpool
- Colors: Yellow & Black

Championships
- Regular season titles: Midland Intermediate League 1951/52 English League North 1979/80

The Liverpool Leopards were a British ice hockey club from Liverpool, England. They were formed in 1948 and played their home games at the Palace Ice Rink, Liverpool. The team competed in several leagues during their existence. The club folded at the end of the 1981–82 season.

== History ==
=== Midland League ===
The Midland Intermediate League was formed in 1951 and lasted for four years, with the Merseyside outfit competing in a four-team competition with Grimsby Redwings, Blackpool Seagulls and the Nottingham Wolves. The Leopards won the inaugural title in the 1951–52, as well as C.W. Jones Cup and the winning the Blackpool Icedrome Trophy to complete a treble, without doubt the city's most successful period in hockey.

=== Southern League ===
Ice hockey returned to Merseyside in 1973, with the Leopards joining the Southern League. The reborn Leopards finished sixth in the seven-team competition in 1972–73, before finishing last in the following two seasons. In 1975–76, the Leopards improved to a second-place finish as the league was split in two, with Liverpool placed in the Midland divison. Third place in 1976–77 was followed by fifth in the Southern League's final season, the club winning just one match.

=== English League North ===
The end of the Southern League saw the formation of the English League before the start of the 1978–79 season. Playing in the Northern division, which largely mirrored the old Southern League Midland division. The club were again second last but improved to five wins.

Under the guidance of chief coach Bill Wilson and Swedish player-coach Åke Alm, who had arrived from national champions Murrayfield Racers, Liverpool won the 1979–80 title, becoming the first team to go the entire season undefeated after beating Sheffield Knights 19–0. In the Icy Smith Cup, Liverpool failed to reach the national final after they were knocked out by division rivals Blackpool, losing 3–2 in the regional final. Charlie Birch, with a 91% save percentage over the season was named the League's Netminder of the Year and placed in the League's dream team alongside Bernie Butler, Frank Davies and Alan Mortimer. Alm was named Coach of the Year.

The 1980–81 season saw Liverpool finish second to old foes Blackpool. Bernie Butler was once again a standout player as he finished third in the League's top scorers.

Liverpool's final season saw them finish fifth out of nine teams, with Butler once again making the league's dream team. 1982-83 saw another major restructure of the British game with the arrival of the British Hockey League. Unfortunately the Leopards didn't get to take part in the new league structure, as they were disbanded in the summer before its inception.

== Liverpool Tournament ==
The Leopards hosted an annual invitational tournament from 1949 to 1956. In its five-year existence, the home side won the "C.W. Jones Cup" twice (1951/2 & 1954/5). The club also finished runners up on two occasions.

== Honours ==
Midland Intermediate League

- 1951–52

English League North

- 1979-80

Liverpool Tournament

- 1952, 1955

Blackpool Icedrome Trophy

- 1952
