= England Hockey League =

England Hockey League may refer to:

== Field hockey ==
- Men's England Hockey League
- Women's England Hockey League

== Ice Hockey ==
- English League (ice hockey)
- English National Ice Hockey League
- English National League
- English National League (1981–82)
- English Premier Ice Hockey League
