= Dan Cloutier =

Canadian ice hockey player (born 1976)

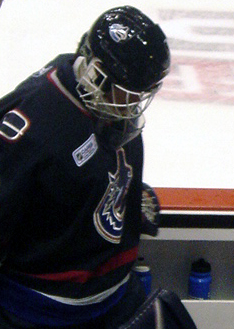
- Cloutier with the Vancouver Canucks in 2005
- Born: April 22, 1976 (age 50) Mont-Laurier, Quebec, Canada
- Height: 6 ft 1 in (185 cm)
- Weight: 195 lb (88 kg; 13 st 13 lb)
- Position: Goaltender
- Caught: Left
- Played for: New York Rangers; Tampa Bay Lightning; Vancouver Canucks; EC KAC; Los Angeles Kings
- National team: Canada
- NHL draft: 26th overall, 1994; New York Rangers
- Playing career: 1996–2009

Daniel Cloutier (born April 22, 1976) is a Canadian ice hockey executive and former player. Previously a goaltender, he holds an executive position with the Ontario Hockey League (OHL) Guelph Storm, the team with which he completed his junior career. In his 10-year National Hockey League (NHL) career, Cloutier played with the New York Rangers, Tampa Bay Lightning, Vancouver Canucks and Los Angeles Kings, spending the majority of his career in Vancouver. He employed a combination of both butterfly and stand-up goaltending and was known for wearing the uncommon birdcage-style helmet.

Cloutier played junior hockey in the OHL for four seasons with the Sault Ste. Marie Greyhounds and Guelph Storm, making two Memorial Cup appearances in 1993 and 1996. Following his second OHL season, he was selected 26th overall by the Rangers in the 1994 NHL entry draft. He began his professional career spending time in the minor leagues with the Rangers' American Hockey League (AHL) affiliates, before joining the NHL team full-time in 1998–99. After three seasons playing within the Rangers organization, he was traded to the Lightning, where he spent one-and-a-half years.

In February 2001, he was acquired by the Canucks. Cloutier enjoyed his most successful years as an NHL goaltender with Vancouver, recording three consecutive 30-win seasons between 2001–02 and 2003–04. In the 2006 off-season, he was dealt to Los Angeles, where he struggled with injuries and a decline in play. His contract was bought out by the team following the 2007–08 season. As part of an attempted comeback in 2009, he first signed a deal to try out with the Detroit Red Wings at the team's training camp, then played briefly with the AHL's Rockford IceHogs, before retiring due to chronic injury problems. Internationally, Cloutier was part of two Canadian teams. He won a gold medal at the 1995 World Junior Championship and was a fourth-string goaltender at the 2001 IIHF World Championship.

After his time with the Kings, Cloutier served as an assistant coach to his older brother, Sylvain, with the Corpus Christi IceRays of the Central Hockey League for one season. Following his retirement, he became a goaltending coach for the Barrie Colts of the OHL.

== Playing career ==
=== Junior career ===
As a 15-year-old, Cloutier played Junior B with the St. Thomas Stars of the Western Ontario Hockey League (WOHL). He recorded a 5.83 goals against average (GAA) over 14 games in his lone season with the team in 1991–92.

The following season, Cloutier began a four-year career in the Ontario Hockey League (OHL), debuting with the Sault Ste. Marie Greyhounds. He played in 12 games (4–6–0) (Note: The remaining 2 games constitute "non-decisions" in which Cloutier was not on the ice when the game-winning goal was scored.) with the Greyounds, recording a 4.62 GAA in the regular season. In the 1993 OHL playoffs, Cloutier appeared in an additional four games, winning one and losing two, as part of the Greyhounds' run to the J. Ross Robertson Cup Finals. Although they lost the league championship to the Peterborough Petes four-games-to-one, the Greyhounds still qualified for the 1993 Memorial Cup as the tournament's host team. The Greyhounds met the Petes again in the Memorial Cup final, defeating them by a 4–2 score. Cloutier did not appear in any Memorial Cup games, in lieu of starter Kevin Hodson. During his rookie season in the OHL, he also played in five games at the Junior A level with the Timmins Golden Bears of the Northern Ontario Junior Hockey Association.

Cloutier assumed the starting position with the Greyhounds in 1993–94, posting 28 wins, 14 losses and 6 ties, along with a 3.56 GAA and .890 save percentage. Appearing in an additional 14 playoff games, he led the Greyhounds to the OHL semifinals, where they were defeated by the Detroit Jr. Red Wings.

In the off-season, Cloutier was selected by the New York Rangers 26th overall in the 1994 NHL entry draft. He was the third-ranked goaltender playing in North America by the NHL Central Scouting Bureau and the fourth goaltender taken in the draft. Appearing in his first NHL training camp in September 1994, he was returned to the OHL by the middle of the month.

During his third junior season in 1994–95, Cloutier recorded a 4.41 GAA in 45 games (15–26–2). As a team, the Greyhounds struggled and finished out of the playoffs. In the off-season, Cloutier was signed by the Rangers to an NHL contract on July 7, 1995.

Despite his NHL contract, Cloutier remained in the OHL for the 1995–96 season. In his 12th game of the season with Sault Ste. Marie, he suffered a shoulder injury that sidelined him for two months. During his return to the lineup in a game against the Windsor Spitfires on January 2, 1996, he reaggravated the injury. While continuing to recover, he was dealt to the Guelph Storm at the trade deadline on January 10 in exchange for goaltender Andy Adams and two draft picks. Splitting the campaign between the Greyhounds and Storm, he recorded a 2.85 GAA in 30 games. As the Storm finished the season with lowest GAA in the league, Cloutier and backup Brett Thompson were jointly awarded the Dave Pinkney Trophy. Cloutier additionally received OHL Second All-Star Team honours. In the playoffs, he recorded a 3.14 GAA in 16 games. However, for the second time in four years, his team was defeated in the J. Ross Robertson Cup Finals by the Peterborough Petes. Despite losing the OHL title, Guelph earned a berth into the 1996 Memorial Cup as the OHL's representative; the Petes had an automatic bye into the tournament as the host team. The Storm lost all three of their round-robin games, failing to qualify for the Memorial Cup playoffs. Cloutier had a 4.00 GAA in the three contests.

=== Early career (1996–2001) ===
Cloutier began his professional career in 1996–97 with the Binghamton Rangers of the American Hockey League (AHL), New York's minor league affiliate. He assumed the starting position in Binghamton as a rookie, posting a 3.55 GAA and .892 save percentage to be named to the AHL All-Rookie Team. The following season, New York changed their AHL affiliate to the Hartford Wolf Pack; Cloutier was consequently moved to Hartford for the club's inaugural season in 1998–99. By late-December 1998, he earned a call-up to the Rangers as backup goaltender Jason Muzzatti was demoted to the Wolf Pack. At the time of his call-up, Rangers management established that although he would play backup to Mike Richter, they intended on giving him opportunities to play. In anticipation of Cloutier's NHL debut, the team's goaltending consultant, Sam St. Laurent, described his playing style as a combination of both butterfly and stand-up goaltending.

He appeared in his first NHL game on January 3, 1998, replacing Richter seven minutes into a contest against the Washington Capitals. Cloutier stopped all 16 shots he faced to record his first NHL victory by a 3–2 score. He made his first NHL start the following game against the Carolina Hurricanes on January 6, 1998. Stopping 26 shots, he helped the Rangers to a 4–2 win. He played 12 games total in 1998–99, backing Richter up for the remainder of the season, recording 4 wins, 5 losses and a tie with a 2.50 GAA and .907 save percentage. Perhaps his most well-known performance as a Ranger was during a game against the New York Islanders on April 4, 1998, in which he fought opposing goalie Tommy Salo. With seven minutes remaining in a 3–0 loss, several fights broke out between players. While Salo tried to intervene in a fight between the Rangers' P. J. Stock and Islanders' Mariusz Czerkawski, Cloutier attacked the Islanders goaltender. The subsequent goalie fight resulted in Cloutier repeatedly punching Salo in the back of the head before taking it upon himself to stop. He proceeded to skate towards the Islanders bench, challenging the opposing players before being restrained by a referee.

In the 1998 off-season, the Rangers signed goaltender Kay Whitmore who Cloutier competed with to retain his backup position. Whitmore spent the season in the minors as Cloutier was kept on the Rangers roster in 1998–99. Playing in his first full NHL season, Cloutier appeared in 22 games (6 wins, 8 losses, 3 ties) with a 2.68 GAA and .914 save percentage.

The following off-season, Cloutier was traded on the day of the 1999 NHL entry draft (June 26, 1999) to the Tampa Bay Lightning. He was sent to Tampa Bay, along with winger Niklas Sundstrom, a first-round selection (Nikita Alexeev) in 2000 and a third-round selection (subsequently traded) in 2000, for the Lightning's first-round selection in that year's draft (Pavel Brendl). With the departure of Tampa Bay's previous starter, Bill Ranford, to the Detroit Red Wings and Darren Puppa nearing the end of his career, Cloutier assumed the starting position for his new club. Cloutier's first season as an NHL starter was interrupted on several occasions with numerous injuries and a suspension. He suffered a strained groin early in the campaign on November 18, 1999, forcing him out of two games. On January 14, 2000, he was suspended by the league for four games after an incident with Islanders forward Tim Connolly. After the two collided, Cloutier cross-checked Connolly, then kicked his head (Connolly's helmet was intact) while he was lying face-down on the ice. The following month, he re-strained his groin on February 21 and missed four games. Cloutier missed another four contests beginning on March 14 after injuring his neck. His fourth injury of the season occurred on March 28, when he strained his medial collateral ligament (MCL) and missed five games. He finished the 1999–2000 season appearing in 52 games for the Lightning, recording 9 wins, 30 losses and 3 ties as the team finished second-last in the league. He registered a 3.49 GAA and .885 save percentage.

Injury troubles continued the following season, in 2000–01, as Cloutier was sidelined for nine games early in the season after straining his biceps on October 22, 2000. After recovering, he recorded his first NHL shutout, making 26 saves, in a 3–0 win against the Detroit Red Wings on December 2, 2000. He achieved the feat in his 95th career game in the NHL. During that month, head coach Steve Ludzik began playing backup Kevin Weekes in favour of Cloutier. By the trade deadline, Cloutier was dealt to the Vancouver Canucks on February 7, 2001, in exchange for defenceman Adrian Aucoin and a second-round selection in the 2001 draft.

=== Vancouver Canucks (2001–06) ===
Upon arriving in Vancouver, Cloutier began sharing starts with veteran goaltender Bob Essensa; the Canucks' third goaltender, Félix Potvin, was traded away to the Los Angeles Kings soon after Cloutier's acquisition. Playing in 16 games with the Canucks to close out the 2000–01 season, Cloutier recorded 4 wins, 6 losses and 5 ties, along with a 2.43 GAA and .894 save percentage. He joined the Canucks at the end of the season, during the playoff drive, when the Canucks barely made the playoffs. It would be their first playoffs in 5 seasons. They were the last placed team at 90 points, tied with the Phoenix Coyotes, who also ended the season with 90 points. However, the Canucks won one more game than the Coyotes (36 vs. 35) thus gaining the last playoff spot.

Playing the first-seeded Colorado Avalanche in the opening round, Cloutier made his first NHL post-season appearance in game one, stopping 23 of 28 shots in a losing effort. Having surrendered five goals, including the game-winner in the final minute after an ill-advised poke-check attempt, Essensa was given the start over Cloutier for the following two contests. After Essensa suffered a knee injury in game three, Cloutier was back in net for the fourth and final game of the series, a 5–1 loss. He had a 4.63 GAA and .842 save percentage in his first two career playoff games. Despite the Canucks' early playoff exit, Cloutier's addition to the team helped bolster a young and improving team led by such players as captain Markus Näslund, winger Todd Bertuzzi and defencemen Ed Jovanovski and Mattias Öhlund.

During the off-season, both Canucks goaltenders became free agents. Cloutier was re-signed on July 18, 2001, while Essensa agreed to a contract with the Buffalo Sabres. With Essensa's departure, Cloutier established himself as the team's starting goaltender in 2001–02. He notched his first shutout as a Canuck on October 13, 2001, in a 4–0 win against the Avalanche. The following month, Cloutier was named NHL Player of the Week on November 6, 2001. He earned a second such distinction near the end of the season on March 18, 2002. Eight days later, he recorded his seventh and final shutout of the campaign in a 4–0 win against the Los Angeles Kings, setting a new team record. His seven shutouts surpassed Gary Smith and Garth Snow's previous team record of six, accomplished in 1974–75 and 1998–99, respectively. Cloutier's mark was later surpassed by Roberto Luongo, who recorded nine shutouts in 2008–09. Cloutier finished his first full season with Vancouver posting 31 wins, 22 losses and 5 ties with a 2.43 GAA and .901 save percentage. He played in a career-high 62 games despite missing nine games in January and February 2002 with an ankle injury.

Entering the 2002 playoffs as the eighth seed for the second consecutive year, the Canucks faced the Presidents' Trophy-winning Detroit Red Wings in the opening round. With 32- and 34-save performances from Cloutier, the Canucks won the first two games of the series in Detroit. In game three, the Canucks and Red Wings were tied with a minute remaining in the second period when Red Wings defenceman Nicklas Lidström scored on Cloutier with a slapshot from centre ice. The goal was observed by the media as a turning point in the series for both Cloutier and the Canucks as a team. The Red Wings won game three, as well as the next three contests to eliminate the Canucks in six games; Cloutier was taken out of the game in the first period of the next two contests in favour of backup Peter Skudra.

Cloutier began the 2002–03 season by recording a shutout against the Calgary Flames on October 10, 2002. It marked the first time in Canucks history that the team began the season with a shutout win. In November 2002, Cloutier won 11 of 12 games, including a team record 10 straight games, while recording a 2.15 GAA and .920 save percentage. He was named NHL Player of the Month, becoming the fourth Canucks player in team history to receive the distinction. He suffered a setback in December 2002, when he missed three games with a knee injury. On February 17, 2003, he was named NHL Player of the Week for the third time in his career. Six days later, he recorded his 30th win of the season, becoming the first Canucks goaltender in team history to reach the plateau in back-to-back years. That same week, he suffered his second knee injury of the season and missed 10 games. He returned to the lineup by mid-March to finish the season with Vancouver. After the Canucks ranked in the eighth and final playoff spot in Cloutier's first two seasons with the team, Cloutier helped lead them to within one point of the Northwest Division title in 2002–03. In 57 games, he posted 33 wins, 16 losses and 7 ties with a 2.42 GAA and .908 save percentage. Cloutier won the first and only playoff series of his career in 2003 as the Canucks eliminated the St. Louis Blues in seven games. He made 33 saves in the deciding contest, a 4–1 win for Vancouver. Advancing to the second round against the Minnesota Wild, the Canucks took a three-games-to-one lead. With Vancouver needing one more win to eliminate the Wild, Cloutier was taken out of Game 5 in favour of rookie Alex Auld after allowing six goals on 21 shots through two periods. As both teams were leaving the ice at the start of the second intermission, opposing goaltender Dwayne Roloson bumped Canucks forward Trevor Linden, prompting Cloutier to challenge Roloson; Cloutier threw two punches towards Roloson and received minor penalties for roughing and for leaving his crease. With Cloutier on the bench for the third period, the Canucks lost 7–2. In the following two games, Cloutier allowed nine goals on 40 shots as the Wild completed a three-game comeback to eliminate the Canucks.

In the off-season, Cloutier was re-signed to a one-year, $2.5 million contract on July 15, 2003. Nearly two months into the subsequent season, Cloutier recorded his 100th career NHL win, making 31 saves in a 3–1 victory over the Ottawa Senators on November 27, 2003. As the season progressed, Cloutier suffered several more injuries, the first of which was a groin injury in December 2003 that sidelined him for three games. He missed three more games before the season ended with cases of the flu and a lower-body injury. On February 14, 2004, he was fined $1,000 by the league for hitting opposing forward Ronald Petrovický in the face with his blocker during a game against the Atlanta Thrashers.

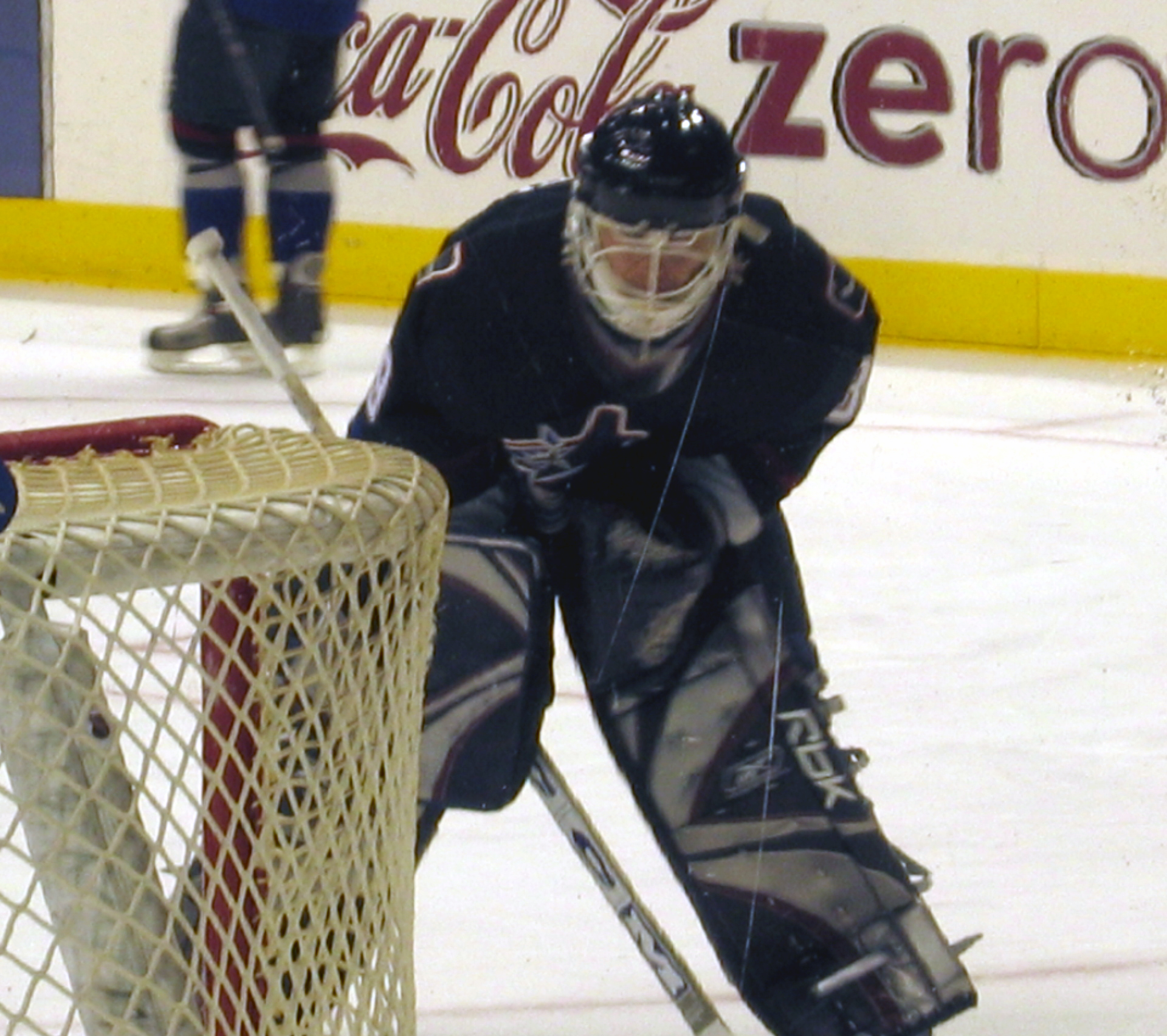
Cloutier with the Canucks in 2005

Cloutier's regular season success with the Canucks continued in 2003–04, as he became the first goaltender in team history to record three consecutive 30-win seasons. Over 60 games, he recorded 33 wins, 21 losses and 6 ties. His 2.27 GAA, which established a Canucks team record (later surpassed by Roberto Luongo), and .914 save percentage were both career highs. In the opening round of the 2004 playoffs against the Calgary Flames, Cloutier suffered another injury, spraining his right ankle in the first period of game three. After Johan Hedberg initially replaced Cloutier, Alex Auld filled in for the final three games of the series; Vancouver was defeated in seven games.

As initial contract negotiations failed in the off-season, Cloutier filed for arbitration on July 16, 2004. Arbitration was avoided by both sides when Cloutier agreed to a one-year, $3 million contract 11 days later. Due to the 2004–05 NHL lockout, however, Cloutier spent the season mostly inactive until signing with EC KAC of the Austrian Hockey League on January 20, 2005. Replacing injured starter Andrew Verner, he appeared in 13 games with the Klagenfurt-based team, going undefeated with a 1.94 GAA. EC KAC finished the regular season second with the second-best record in the league. Cloutier appeared in 10 additional playoff games, recording a 2.75 GAA. EC KAC advanced to the finals, where they were defeated four-games-to-three by the Vienna Capitals.

With NHL play set to resume in 2005–06, Cloutier re-signed with the Canucks to a two-year, $5 million contract on August 18, 2005. Returning to the Canucks, he was injured early in the season during a game against the Avalanche on October 29, 2005. Attempting to check Avalanche forward Andrew Brunette, Canucks defenceman Nolan Baumgartner collided with Cloutier, causing a goal and forcing Cloutier out of the game with both a concussion and whiplash. The injury caused him to miss five games. Soon after returning, Cloutier was re-injured in a game against the Mighty Ducks of Anaheim on November 20, when forward Rob Niedermayer skated into the crease and collided with Cloutier. He stayed in net to complete the game, a 3–2 win, and was on the bench the following game to backup Auld. However, after aggravating the knee in a practice on November 23, an MRI revealed a partially torn anterior cruciate ligament (ACL). Electing for reconstructive knee surgery, occurring on December 15, Cloutier missed the remainder of the season.

As the Canucks missed the playoffs in 2006, several changes were made to team personnel in the off-season. One such change included the acquisition of All-Star goaltender Roberto Luongo from the Florida Panthers. Shortly after Luongo was acquired, Cloutier was traded to the Los Angeles Kings on July 5, 2006, for a second-round draft pick in 2007 and a conditional pick in 2009. Cloutier finished his five-and-a-half-year tenure with the Canucks third on the team's all-time wins list with 109, behind Kirk McLean and Richard Brodeur, and second in shutouts with 14, behind McLean. In a 2012 interview following his retirement, Cloutier stated that he "loved playing in Vancouver the most" during his NHL career. He recalled the city's regeneration into a hockey market and described how the team went from playing home games that "seemed half full" to creating a "playoff game atmosphere every night."

=== Los Angeles Kings (2006–08) ===
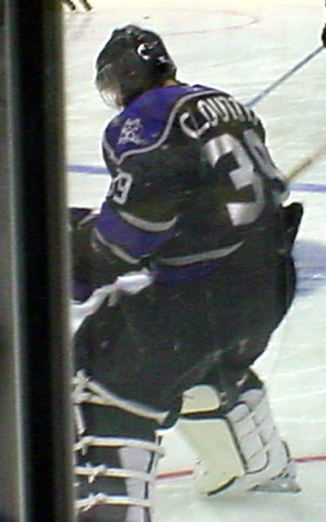
Cloutier with the Kings in 2006

Leading up to the 2006–07 season, Cloutier signed a two-year, $6.2 million contract extension with the Kings on September 27, 2006. He had one year, valued at $2.55 million, remaining on his existing contract, which was transferred over from the Canucks. Cloutier moved to the Kings alongside Head Coach Marc Crawford, who was hired by the team shortly after being let go by the Canucks in the 2006 off-season.

Cloutier made his Kings debut in the first game of the regular season, a 4–3 loss to the Anaheim Ducks on October 6, 2006. He made 28 saves on 32 shots. During his first week of the regular season, he suffered a hip injury, but continued playing on the insistence of team management. In retrospect, he later recalled that his "biggest mistake was playing hurt for them." The Kings organization also had Cloutier change his goaltender mask from the uncommon mask/cage style to the more traditional full-fibreglass style for safety and insurance purposes. After recording 6 wins in 24 games and a 3.98 GAA, Cloutier's hip forced him to end his season, aggravating it on December 23, 2006, in a 7–0 loss to the Nashville Predators.

At the time, the injury was still believed to be minor and Cloutier volunteered to continue playing in lieu of backup Mathieu Garon also being sidelined with a broken finger. When the pain in his hip quickly got worse, Cloutier appealed to team management. He saw a specialist who diagnosed him with a torn hip labrum and told him the injury could put his career in jeopardy. He was subsequently flown to Colorado for surgery on January 12, 2007. Cloutier remained in Colorado for ongoing treatment and was lodged by the organization in a motel 31 miles away from the clinic. The Kings' original insistence that he play and his subsequent lodging proved to be a contentious issue for Cloutier.

Having recovered from his injury, he returned for training camp in September 2007. He was assigned to the Kings' AHL affiliate, the Manchester Monarchs, after losing a roster spot to goaltenders Jason LaBarbera and Jonathan Bernier. During his stint with Manchester, Cloutier struggled to earn playing time, as younger goaltenders Jonathan Quick, Danny Taylor and Erik Ersberg were given more opportunity to play. At one point, he reported to the team's arena in preparation for a road trip, but was left in Manchester in favour of the team's other goaltenders. To Cloutier's surprise, he was recalled by Los Angeles on February 7, 2008, while Kings backup Jean-Sébastien Aubin was sent down in his place. After clearing re-entry waivers, he joined the Kings' roster to backup LaBarbera. Three days later, Cloutier started in goal against the Columbus Blue Jackets; he recorded his first NHL win in over a year, backstopping the Kings to a 3–2 shootout victory. After LaBarbera became sidelined with a groin injury, Cloutier began earning additional playing time with the Kings. On March 10, he played against the Canucks for the first time since being traded. He stopped 38 shots in a 2–1 overtime loss against his former teammates. Later that month, he suffered a groin injury and missed three games. Remaining with the Kings for the remainder of the 2007–08 season as backup to Ersberg, he recorded two wins in nine games with a 3.44 GAA and .887 save percentage.

In the subsequent off-season, Cloutier's remaining year on his contract was bought out by the Kings on June 21, 2008. As teams cannot buyout the contract of an injured player, Cloutier claimed he was not healthy and contested the move. However, the NHL ruled in favour of the Kings; the buyout stood and Cloutier became an unrestricted free agent. Consequently, he received $2 million over the next two years from the Kings.

Without an NHL job, Cloutier took up an assistant coaching position in the Central Hockey League (CHL) with his older brother Sylvain Cloutier, who had just been hired as head coach of the Corpus Christi IceRays.

=== Return to hockey and retirement (2009–10) ===
After remaining inactive for a season, Cloutier was offered a tryout with the Canucks for the team's 2009 training camp. Soon thereafter, he accepted another tryout offer from the Detroit Red Wings on September 4, 2009, sensing he had a better chance to secure a contract with the latter team. He was expected to compete with Jimmy Howard for the Wings' backup position. On September 21, Cloutier made his first and only pre-season appearance with the Red Wings, splitting a game with Wings prospect Daniel Larsson; he stopped all eight shots he faced in a 4–2 loss against the New York Rangers. While Red Wings General Manager Ken Holland said Cloutier "looked sharp" in his first NHL action since April 5, 2008, he also alluded to the media that the amount of goaltenders competing for spots within the Red Wings organization was a factor against the likelihood of him signing Cloutier. Three days later, he was officially released from the Red Wings.

Cloutier subsequently received several offers to play in Europe until signing a tryout contract with the Rockford IceHogs of the AHL in December 2009. He reportedly had received offers from two other North American teams, but chose Rockford as the best choice for his family. Cloutier made his IceHogs debut on December 6 against the Manitoba Moose, marking his return to professional hockey after 18 months. He played 26 minutes before receiving a match penalty for punching Moose player Guillaume Desbiens after the opposing forward collided with him in his crease. The following day, Cloutier was additionally suspended by the AHL for one game. After serving his ban, he recorded his first win the IceHogs against the Texas Stars on December 12. Cloutier began receiving interest from NHL teams, but his hip began acting up once again. By the end of the month, Cloutier and the IceHogs mutually agreed to terminate his tryout contract. He recorded one win and one loss in three games with the IceHogs, along with a 2.47 GAA and .893 save percentage. In a later interview, published on the Canucks' website in August 2010, Cloutier declared he was most likely retiring due to chronic injury troubles.

== International play ==
Medal record

Representing Canada

Ice hockey

World Junior Championships
Gold medal – first place	1995 Canada	

During Cloutier's OHL career, he competed in the 1995 World Junior Championships. He went undefeated in three games with a 2.67 GAA to help Canada win a gold medal as the host country in Red Deer, Alberta. Cloutier missed a second opportunity to play for the Canadian national junior team the following year due to a shoulder injury suffered during OHL play.

On May 4, 2001, he was added to Team Canada's roster for the 2001 World Championships. One of four goaltenders on the roster, alongside Roberto Luongo, Jean-Sébastien Giguère and Fred Brathwaite, he did not appear in any games. Canada finished the tournament in fifth place.

== Coaching career ==
Following his release from the Los Angeles Kings in 2008, Cloutier joined his brother Sylvain Cloutier's coaching staff on the Central Hockey League (CHL)'s Corpus Christi IceRays as a de facto assistant coach. He served in that capacity for the 2008–09 season until his failed attempt at an NHL return in 2009. In July 2010, Cloutier signed a one-year contract to become a part-time goaltending coach with the OHL's Barrie Colts.

=== Return to Canucks ===
In September 2012, Cloutier was hired by the Vancouver Canucks as a goaltending consultant, mostly to work with prospect goaltenders in the AHL's Chicago Wolves. On June 14, 2016, the Canucks announced that Cloutier had been named the team's goaltending coach During the 2018 off-season, former Canucks goaltending coach Ian Clark returned to the team and Cloutier was reassigned to be a development coach for Vancouver. On September 11, 2019, after one season in his new role, Cloutier left the organization for personal reasons. On May 29, 2025, the Guelph Storm hired him as an advisor to Director of Hockey Operations Scott Walker.

== Personal life ==
Cloutier was born to Ivan and Susan Cloutier in Mont-Laurier, Quebec, on April 22, 1976. He moved with his family at a young age to Sault Ste. Marie, Ontario, as a result of his father's work as a logger. Having grown up in both French and English communities, Cloutier is bilingual. Cloutier's older brother, Sylvain is also a hockey player who once captained the OHL's Guelph Storm. After a professional career with the Coventry Blaze in England, Sylvain became a head coach for the minor professional Corpus Christi IceRays of the CHL in 2008, and recently resigned from the successor IceRays. He later served as a player-coach of the Hull Stingrays of the Elite Ice Hockey League.

As a youth, Cloutier played in the 1990 Quebec International Pee-Wee Hockey Tournament with a minor ice hockey team from Sault Ste. Marie. He was at one time on the same bantam team (Note: Bantam is the minor hockey level for 13- and 14-year-olds in Canada.) as another future NHL goaltender, Marty Turco. Like many Quebec-born goaltenders of his time, Cloutier patterned the butterfly elements of his playing style after Hall of Fame goaltender Patrick Roy.

Cloutier and his wife Nikki, have a daughter and a son together. Following his playing career, his family moved to Barrie, Ontario.

In November 2005, following Cloutier's season-ending ACL injury, a rumour began circling in the media that he was being investigated for a hit-and-run accident that killed two people outside a Gastown nightclub. Cloutier never commented on the record, while his agent later refuted the rumour, saying it was "absolutely untrue" and that Cloutier "was livid with that story."

== Career statistics ==
=== Regular season and playoffs ===
			Regular season										Playoffs
Season	Team	League	GP	W	L	T	OTL	MIN	GA	SO	GAA	SV%	GP	W	L	MIN	GA	SO	GAA	SV%
1991–92	St. Thomas Stars	WOHL	14	—	—	—	—	823	80	—	5.83	—	—	—	—	—	—	—	—	—
1992–93	Timmins Golden Bears	NOJHL	5	4	0	0	—	255	10	0	2.35	—	—	—	—	—	—	—	—	—
1992–93	Sault Ste. Marie Greyhounds	OHL	12	4	6	0	—	572	44	0	4.62	—	4	1	2	231	12	0	3.12	—
1993–94	Sault Ste. Marie Greyhounds	OHL	55	28	14	6	—	2934	174	2	3.56	.890	14	10	4	833	52	0	3.75	—
1994–95	Sault Ste. Marie Greyhounds	OHL	45	15	26	2	—	2518	185	1	4.41	—	—	—	—	—	—	—	—	—
1995–96	Sault Ste. Marie Greyhounds	OHL	13	9	3	0	—	641	43	0	4.02	.892	—	—	—	—	—	—	—	—
1995–96	Guelph Storm	OHL	17	12	2	2	—	1004	35	2	2.09	.927	16	11	5	993	52	2	3.14	—
1995–96	Guelph Storm	MC	—	—	—	—	—	—	—	—	—	—	3	0	3	180	12	0	4.00	.887
1996–97	Binghamton Rangers	AHL	60	23	28	8	—	3367	199	3	3.55	.892	4	1	3	236	13	0	3.31	.893
1997–98	New York Rangers	NHL	12	4	5	1	—	551	23	0	2.50	.907	—	—	—	—	—	—	—	—
1997–98	Hartford Wolf Pack	AHL	24	13	8	3	—	1417	62	0	2.63	.917	8	5	3	478	24	0	3.01	.921
1998–99	New York Rangers	NHL	22	6	8	3	—	1096	49	0	2.68	.914	—	—	—	—	—	—	—	—
1999–00	Tampa Bay Lightning	NHL	52	9	30	3	—	2492	145	0	3.49	.885	—	—	—	—	—	—	—	—
2000–01	Tampa Bay Lightning	NHL	24	3	13	3	—	1005	59	1	3.52	.891	—	—	—	—	—	—	—	—
2000–01	Vancouver Canucks	NHL	16	4	6	5	—	914	37	0	2.43	.894	2	0	2	117	9	0	4.63	.842
2000–01	Detroit Vipers	IHL	1	0	1	0	—	59	3	0	3.05	.903	—	—	—	—	—	—	—	—
2001–02	Vancouver Canucks	NHL	62	31	22	5	—	3501	142	7	2.43	.901	6	2	3	273	16	0	3.51	.870
2002–03	Vancouver Canucks	NHL	57	33	16	7	—	3376	136	2	2.42	.908	14	7	7	833	45	0	3.24	.868
2003–04	Vancouver Canucks	NHL	60	33	21	6	—	3539	134	5	2.27	.914	3	1	1	138	5	0	2.17	.922
2004–05	EC KAC	AUT	13	7	0	5	—	722	25	1	1.94	.937	10	6	4	590	27	1	2.74	.913
2005–06	Vancouver Canucks	NHL	13	8	3	—	1	680	36	0	3.17	.892	—	—	—	—	—	—	—	—
2006–07	Los Angeles Kings	NHL	24	6	14	—	2	1281	85	0	3.98	.860	—	—	—	—	—	—	—	—
2007–08	Manchester Monarchs	AHL	14	4	9	0	—	719	42	0	3.50	.869	—	—	—	—	—	—	—	—
2007–08	Los Angeles Kings	NHL	9	2	4	—	1	247	28	0	3.44	.887	—	—	—	—	—	—	—	—
2009–10	Rockford IceHogs	AHL	3	1	1	—	0	146	6	0	2.47	.893	—	—	—	—	—	—	—	—
NHL totals			351	139	142	33	4	18,928	874	15	2.77	.899	25	10	13	1361	75	0	3.31	.872

=== International ===
Year	Team	Event	GP	W	L	T	MIN	GA	SO	GAA	SV%
1995	Canada	WJC	3	3	0	0	180	8	0	2.67	.905
Junior totals			3	3	0	0	180	8	0	2.67	.905

- Career statistics taken from Cloutier's TSN.ca profile.

== Awards ==
Award	Year
CHL Memorial Cup Champion	1992–1993
World Junior Championship Gold Medal	1994–1995
AHL All-Rookie Team	1996–1997
AHL Player of The Week	1996–1997, 1997-1998
OHL Second All-Star Team	1996
Dave Pinkney Trophy (OHL's lowest team GAA; shared with Brett Thompson)	1996

== Notes ==
Preceded by Niklas Sundström	New York Rangers first-round draft pick 1994	Succeeded by Jeff Brown
