= Hüppe =

Hüppe or Huppe is a German surname.

== List of people with the surname ==
- Curtis Huppe (born 1979), Canadian former ice hockey forward
- Hubert Hüppe (born 1956), German politician

== See also ==
- Hoopoe, a bird
