= Sylvain Cloutier =

Canadian ice hockey player (born 1974)

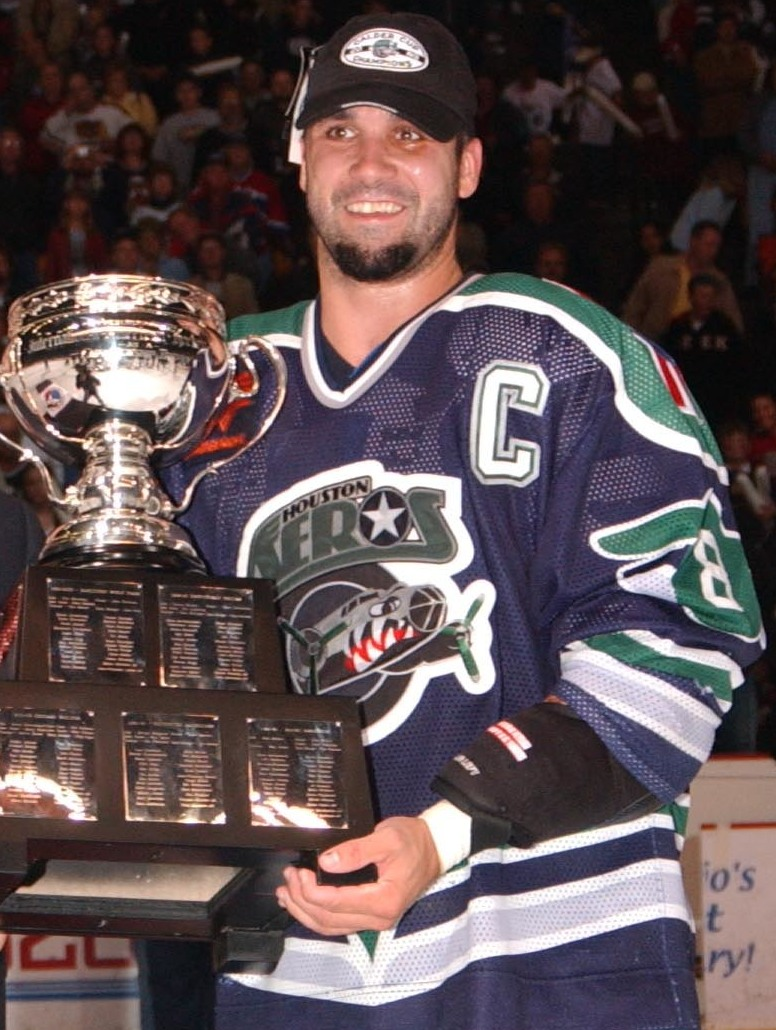
- Cloutier with the Houston Aeros in 2003
- Born: February 13, 1974 (age 52) Mont-Laurier, Quebec, Canada
- Height: 6 ft 0 in (183 cm)
- Weight: 195 lb (88 kg; 13 st 13 lb)
- Position: Centre
- Shot: Left
- Played for: NHL; Chicago Blackhawks; AHL; Adirondack Red Wings; Albany River Rats; Houston Aeros; Syracuse Crunch; IHL; Detroit Vipers; Indianapolis Ice; Orlando Solar Bears; ECHL; Toledo Storm; UHL; Adirondack Frostbite; NLA; HC Ambri-Piotta; EIHL; Coventry Blaze; Hull Stingrays
- NHL draft: 70th overall, 1992; Detroit Red Wings
- Playing career: 1994–2014

Sylvain Richard Cloutier (born February 13, 1974) is a Canadian former professional ice hockey centre. He is the elder brother of Dan Cloutier, And current head coach of the Adirondack Thunder of the ECHL.

== Career ==
Cloutier played junior hockey for the Guelph Storm of the Ontario Hockey League from 1991 to 1994, scoring 237 points and 106 goals while also serving as team captain. He was drafted 70th overall by the Detroit Red Wings in the 1992 NHL entry draft and spent the next four seasons playing in the American Hockey League for the Adirondack Red Wings but never managed to make Detroit's main lineup. He would go on to play seven NHL games for the Chicago Blackhawks in the 1998–99 NHL season.

Cloutier joined the Coventry Blaze of the United Kingdom's Elite Ice Hockey League in 2006 and helped the team win the Elite League title. In 2008, he won his second Elite League title with the Blaze. He then became the head coach of the Corpus Christi IceRays in the Central Hockey League before being let go in February 2009. Afterwards, he returned to the Elite League and became player-coach for the Hull Stingrays. Cloutier became a popular player for the Stingrays, and as such, his number 83 was retired by the Hull Pirates, the successor team for the Stingrays following their liquidation in 2015.

Cloutier began his junior coaching career with the Bradford Rattlers in 2014-15 and helped the team to a 31-11-0 record. Cloutier served four years as head coach and general manager of the Severn Stallions in the Canadian Premier Junior Hockey League beginning in 2017-18. During his time as head coach, the team earned back-to-back Canadian Premier Junior Hockey League Championships in 2018 and 2019.

Cloutier coached the Corpus Christi IceRays of the NAHL South Division, until his resignation in May 2025. He was hired by the Adirondack Thunder of the East Coast Hockey League to be their head coach for the 2025-26 season.

== Career statistics ==
			Regular season					Playoffs
Season	Team	League	GP	G	A	Pts	PIM	GP	G	A	Pts	PIM
1990–91	Sault Ste. Marie North Stars	GNML	34	51	40	91	92	—	—	—	—	—
1991–92	Guelph Storm	OHL	62	35	31	66	74	—	—	—	—	—
1992–93	Guelph Storm	OHL	44	26	29	55	78	5	0	5	5	14
1993–94	Guelph Storm	OHL	66	45	71	116	127	9	7	9	16	32
1993–94	Adirondack Red Wings	AHL	2	0	2	2	2	—	—	—	—	—
1994–95	Adirondack Red Wings	AHL	71	7	26	33	144	—	—	—	—	—
1995–96	Adirondack Red Wings	AHL	65	11	17	28	118	3	0	0	0	4
1995–96	Toledo Storm	ECHL	6	4	2	6	4	—	—	—	—	—
1996–97	Adirondack Red Wings	AHL	77	13	36	49	190	4	0	2	2	4
1997–98	Adirondack Red Wings	AHL	72	14	22	36	155	—	—	—	—	—
1997–98	Detroit Vipers	IHL	8	0	1	1	18	21	7	5	12	31
1998–99	Chicago Blackhawks	NHL	7	0	0	0	0	—	—	—	—	—
1998–99	Indianapolis Ice	IHL	73	21	33	54	128	7	3	2	5	12
1999–00	Albany River Rats	AHL	66	15	28	43	127	5	0	0	0	6
1999–00	Orlando Solar Bears	IHL	9	1	1	2	25	—	—	—	—	—
2000–01	Albany River Rats	AHL	79	16	35	51	115	—	—	—	—	—
2001–02	Albany River Rats	AHL	60	6	10	16	87	—	—	—	—	—
2002–03	Houston Aeros	AHL	69	4	11	15	129	23	3	3	6	28
2003–04	Adirondack IceHawks	UHL	33	16	20	36	62	—	—	—	—	—
2003–04	Albany River Rats	AHL	2	0	0	0	2	—	—	—	—	—
2003–04	Syracuse Crunch	AHL	2	0	1	1	4	—	—	—	—	—
2003–04	HC Ambri-Piotta	NLA	12	3	5	8	14	7	0	2	2	16
2004–05	Adirondack Frostbite	UHL	77	27	50	77	59	6	2	3	5	20
2005–06	Adirondack Frostbite	UHL	75	31	59	90	127	6	5	2	7	11
2006–07	Coventry Blaze	EIHL	52	23	32	55	92	3	1	3	4	0
2007–08	Coventry Blaze	EIHL	49	25	34	59	51	4	1	2	3	8
2009–10	Hull Stingrays	EIHL	44	7	17	24	80	2	1	1	2	0
2010–11	Hull Stingrays	EIHL	51	9	35	44	44	2	1	0	1	0
2011–12	Hull Stingrays	EIHL	50	10	20	30	74	3	1	1	2	8
2012–13	Hull Stingrays	EIHL	51	12	19	31	156	—	—	—	—	—
2013–14	Hull Stingrays	EIHL	52	10	33	43	80	2	0	1	1	6
NHL totals			7	0	0	0	0	—	—	—	—	—
AHL totals			565	86	188	274	1,073	35	3	5	8	42
