= Rob Rankin =

American ice hockey player (born 1982)

- Born: April 27, 1982 (age 44) Eagan, Minnesota, U.S.
- Height: 6 ft 0 in (183 cm)
- Weight: 181 lb (82 kg; 12 st 13 lb)
- Position: Forward
- Shot: Right
- Played for: AHL; Bridgeport Sound Tigers; ECHL; Pensacola Ice Pilots; EIHL; Hull Stingrays; Newcastle Vipers
- NHL draft: Undrafted
- Playing career: 2006–2009

Rob Rankin (born April 27, 1982) is an American former professional ice hockey player who during his career played in the American Hockey League, the ECHL, and the British Elite Ice Hockey League.

He represented the Pensacola Ice Pilots in the 2007 ECHL All-Star Game held at Qwest Arena in Boise, Idaho.

== Career statistics ==
			Regular season						Playoffs
Season	Team	League	GP	G	A	Pts	PIM	+/-	GP	G	A	Pts	PIM
2000-01	Academy of Holy Angels	MSHSL	25	45	35	80	52		--	--	--	--	--
2000-01	Rochester Mustangs	USHL	5	1	1	2	26		--	--	--	--	--
2001–02	Michigan Tech	WCHA	35	1	2	3	42	-11
2002-03	Topeka Scarecrows	USHL	58	22	21	43	161	8	4	1	3	4	12
2003–04	Minnesota State University, Mankato	WCHA	31	5	8	13	48
2004–05	Minnesota State University, Mankato	WCHA	36	6	7	13	84
2005–06	Minnesota State University, Mankato	WCHA	39	12	11	23	109	-4
2005-06	Pensacola Ice Pilots	ECHL	9	2	3	5	4	-7	--	--	--	--	--
2006-07	Pensacola Ice Pilots	ECHL	70	16	37	53	172	-18	--	--	--	--	--
2006-07	Bridgeport Sound Tigers	AHL	2	0	0	0	0	-2	--	--	--	--	--
2007-08	Hull Stingrays	EIHL	53	23	32	55	90		--	--	--	--	--
2008-09	Newcastle Vipers	EIHL	49	12	19	31	136		--	--	--	--	--
