= Sub Zero Ice Rink =

Ice rink in Lancashire, England

Coordinates: 53.8813°N 3.0467°W

- Location: Jubilee Leisure Park; North Promenade; Cleveleys; Lancashire; FY5 DB; England
- Owner: Sub Zero Leisure Ltd
- Capacity: 300
- Opened: 2011

Tenants
- Fylde Flyers 2011-2013; Blackpool Seagulls 2012-present Wyre Seagulls 2011-present

Website
- Sub Zero website

Sub Zero Ice Rink was an ice rink in Cleveleys, Lancashire, England. It was 36 metres (118 ft) x 22 metres (72 ft).

It was home to the Fylde Flyers, Blackpool Seagulls and Wyre Seagulls ice hockey teams.

== History ==
Sub Zero Leisure secured the lease for the building in 2010 and began converting it into an ice rink. The rink opened in April 2011. The rink was home to the Fylde Coast Figure Skating Club.

Three ice hockey teams played at the ice rink. Fylde Flyers played in the English National Ice Hockey League, North Two Division. It was also home to two recreational teams, the re-formed Blackpool Seagulls and Wyre Seagulls.

The lease was not renewed by the building owner, forcing the original investor out. A new leaseholder began running the rink as 'Jubilee Ice Arena' in September 2013. With negative media coverage of the circumstances surrounding the takeover, as well as the opening of another ice rink in nearby Bispham, the business closed again in September 2014. A community interest company was formed to try to keep it open but that too finished and the rink closed for good in October 2015, going into liquidation in 2016. The premises briefly opened as a family entertainment centre and is currently a gym.

Note; If the dimensions quoted above are correct it was a very small rink, since the American (or Imperial) size for a hockey rink is 85 x 185 ft and a full (or Olympic) size rink is 30M x 60M (about 100 ft x 200 ft).
