= 1983–84 BHL season =

- Sport: ice hockey

Seasons
- ← 1982–83 1984–85 →

The 1983–84 BHL season was the second season the British Hockey League. This season saw the introduction of the Premier League and First Division format that would continue until the disbandment of the British Hockey League in 1996. Nine of the fifteen teams which had taken part the previous season joined the Premier League.

The 1983–84 season also saw the reintroduction of the Autumn Cup and the first season of sponsorship by Heineken.

== Kohler Engines Autumn Cup ==
=== Scotland ===
In Scotland the winner of the group stage automatically progressed to the final.

Scotland	GP	W	T	L	GF	GA	Pts
Dundee Rockets	8	7	0	1	82	30	14
Murrayfield Racers	8	5	0	3	51	38	10
Ayr Bruins	8	4	0	4	56	43	8
Glasgow Dynamos	8	3	0	5	30	64	6
Fife Flyers	8	1	0	7	27	71	2

=== England ===
English clubs were divided into two groups; North and South. The winner of each group would play an English Final, the winner going on to play in the final.

==== Group stage ====
England North	GP	W	T	L	GF	GA	Pts
Durham Wasps	6	4	1	1	69	34	9
Whitley Warriors	6	4	0	2	71	45	8
Cleveland Bombers	6	3	0	3	54	50	6
Crowtree Chiefs	6	0	1	5	31	96	1

England South	GP	W	T	L	GF	GA	Pts
Streatham Redskins	8	8	0	0	73	17	16
Nottingham Panthers	8	4	1	3	49	43	9
Solihull Barons	8	4	1	3	51	48	9
Southampton Vikings	8	2	0	6	30	67	4
Peterborough Pirates	8	1	0	7	24	52	2

==== English final ====
- Streatham Redskins 10-3 Durham Wasps

=== Final ===
The final was played at Streatham Ice Rink.

- Dundee Rockets 6-6 Streatham Redskins (Dundee win after penalty shots)

== League ==
Premier League	GP	W	T	L	GF	GA	Pts
Dundee Rockets	32	24	2	6	294	185	50
Durham Wasps	32	23	1	8	282	208	47
Streatham Redskins	32	19	3	10	211	169	41
Ayr Bruins	32	17	4	11	204	177	38
Murrayfield Racers	32	15	2	15	206	175	32
Whitley Warriors	32	12	1	19	235	277	25
Fife Flyers	32	9	2	21	217	237	20
Nottingham Panthers	32	9	2	21	183	277	20
Cleveland Bombers	32	6	1	25	170	297	13

== Playoffs ==
The top six teams entered the playoffs. They were divided into two groups of three. Group A was made up of Dundee, Streatham and Murrayfield while Group B was made up of Durham, Ayr and Whitley. The top two sides in each group advanced to next round. The semi finals and final were played over a single weekend at Wembley Arena.

=== Group A ===
Group A	GP	W	T	L	GF	GA	Pts
Murrayfield Racers	4	3	1	0	24	18	7
Dundee Rockets	4	2	1	1	31	15	5
Streatham Redskins	4	0	0	4	12	34	0

=== Group B ===
England South	GP	W	T	L	GF	GA	Pts
Durham Wasps	4	4	0	0	44	26	8
Ayr Bruins	4	2	0	2	36	28	4
Whitley Warriors	4	0	0	4	21	47	0

=== Semi-finals ===
Semi-final A: Winner A (Murrayfield) vs Runner Up B (Ayr)

- Murrayfield Racers 5-4 Ayr Bruins

Semi-final B: Winner B (Durham) vs Runner Up A (Dundee)

- Durham Wasps 8-10 Dundee Rockets

=== Final ===
- Dundee Rockets 5-4 Murrayfield Racers

Preceded by 1982–83 BHL season	BHL seasons	Succeeded by 1984–85 BHL season
