= 1984–85 BHL season =

- Sport: ice hockey

Seasons
- ← 1983–84 1985–86 →

The 1984–85 British Hockey League season was the third season of the British Hockey League. The membership of the Premier League was increased to ten with the inclusion of the Southampton Vikings. Promotion and relegation was also introduced between the Premier League and the first Division.

== Autumn Cup ==
As with the previous season, teams were divided into one Scottish and two English groups. The winner of the Scottish group advanced directly to the final of the competition while the winners of the two English groups took part in a two legged English Final to the determine the overall finalist. The total number of teams taking part was expanded to fifteen.

=== Scotland ===
Scotland	GP	W	T	L	GF	GA	Pts
Fife Flyers	8	8	0	0	93	45	16
Dundee Rockets	8	5	0	3	86	54	10
Murrayfield Racers	8	4	0	4	61	46	8
Ayr Bruins*	7	2	0	5	45	67	4
Glasgow Dynamos*	7	0	0	7	26	99	0

*One game between the Ayr Bruins and Glasgow Dynamos not played.

=== England ===
England North	GP	W	T	L	GF	GA	Pts
Durham Wasps	8	8	0	0	112	33	16
Cleveland Bombers	8	6	0	2	79	76	12
Whitley Warriors	8	3	0	5	82	67	9
Crowtree Chiefs	8	3	0	5	46	78	9
Altrincham Aces	8	0	0	8	26	91	0

England South	GP	W	T	L	GF	GA	Pts
Solihull Barons	8	8	0	0	87	37	16
Streatham Redskins	8	4	1	3	67	44	9
Nottingham Panthers	8	3	1	4	41	43	7
Peterborough Pirates	8	3	0	5	52	74	6
Southampton Vikings	8	1	0	7	21	70	2

==== English final ====
- Durham Wasps 6-6 Solihull Barons
- Solihull Barons 6-10 Durham Wasps (Durham win 16-12 on aggregate)

=== Final ===
The final was played at Streatham Ice Rink.

- Durham Wasps 6-4 Fife Flyers

== League ==
Teams level on points were separated by results between them.

Team	GP	W	T	L	GF	GA	Pts
Durham Wasps	36	29	2	5	326	167	60
Fife Flyers	36	27	4	5	325	168	58
Murrayfield Racers	36	24	4	8	291	177	52
Ayr Bruins	36	18	3	15	288	251	39
Streatham Redskins	36	17	2	17	215	215	36
Cleveland Bombers	36	16	3	17	285	290	35
Dundee Rockets	36	16	3	17	238	229	35
Nottingham Panthers	36	12	2	22	151	233	26
Whitley Warriors	36	6	1	29	236	358	13
Southampton Vikings	36	3	0	33	125	392	6

== Playoffs ==
The top six teams from the regular season qualified for the playoffs. Group A was made up of Durham, Murrayfield and Streatham while Group B was made up of Fife, Ayr and Cleveland. The semi finals and final were played at Wembley Arena.

=== Group A ===
Group A	GP	W	T	L	GF	GA	Pts
Murrayfield Racers	4	3	0	1	35	18	6
Streatham Redskins	4	1	1	2	20	32	3
Durham Wasps	4	1	1	2	19	24	3

=== Group B ===
Group B	GP	W	T	L	GF	GA	Pts
Fife Flyers	4	4	0	0	38	20	8
Ayr Bruins	4	2	0	2	28	23	4
Cleveland Bombers	4	0	0	4	18	41	0

=== Semi-finals ===
- Fife Flyers 12-3 Streatham Redskins
- Murrayfield Racers 13-4 Ayr Bruins

=== Final ===
- Fife Flyers 9-4 Murrayfield Racers

Preceded by 1983–84 BHL season	BHL seasons	Succeeded by 1985–86 BHL season
