= 1985–86 BHL season =

- Sport: ice hockey

Seasons
- ← 1984–85 1986–87 →

The 1985–86 BHL season was the fourth season of the British Hockey League, the top level of ice hockey in Great Britain. 10 teams participated in the league, and the Durham Wasps won the league title by finishing first in the regular season. The Murrayfield Racers were playoff champions.

== Regular season ==
Team	GP	W	T	L	GF	GA	Pts
Durham Wasps	36	28	1	7	354	184	57
Murrayfield Racers	36	25	2	9	344	217	52
Ayr Bruins	36	23	3	10	356	257	49
Dundee Rockets	36	24	1	11	285	206	49
Fife Flyers	36	20	6	10	270	196	46
Nottingham Panthers	36	15	4	17	181	226	34
Streatham Redskins	36	13	2	21	216	256	28
Cleveland Bombers	36	10	3	23	263	375	23
Whitley Warriors	36	8	2	26	224	324	18
Peterborough Pirates	36	1	2	33	185	436	4

== Playoffs ==
=== Group A ===
Group A	GP	W	T	L	Pts
Fife Flyers	4	4	0	0	8
Durham Wasps	4	1	0	3	2
Ayr Bruins	4	1	0	3	2

=== Group B ===
Group B	GP	W	T	L	Pts
Dundee Rockets	4	3	0	1	6
Murrayfield Racers	4	3	0	1	6
Nottingham Panthers	4	0	0	4	0

=== Semifinals ===
- Dundee Rockets 5-4 Durham Wasps
- Murrayfield Racers 8-4 Fife Flyers

=== Final ===
- Murrayfield Racers 4-2 Dundee Rockets

Preceded by 1984–85 BHL season	BHL seasons	Succeeded by 1986–87 BHL season
