= Curtis Huppe =

Canadian former ice hockey forward (born 1979)

- Born: February 21, 1979 (age 47) Winnipeg, Manitoba, Canada
- Height: 6 ft 1 in (185 cm)
- Weight: 195 lb (88 kg; 13 st 13 lb)
- Position: Right wing
- Shot: Right
- Played for: Muskegon Fury; Greenville Grrrowl; Greensboro Generals; Jackson Bandits; Arkansas RiverBlades; Cincinnati Cyclones; South Carolina Stingrays; Belfast Giants; Coventry Blaze; Corpus Christi IceRays; Hull Stingrays; Manchester Phoenix; Guildford Flames; Milton Keynes Lightning
- Playing career: 2000–2015

Curtis Huppe (born February 21, 1979) is a Canadian former ice hockey forward.

== Career ==
Born in Winnipeg, Manitoba, Huppe began his junior career in the Western Hockey League for the Medicine Hat Tigers, Lethbridge Hurricanes and the Tri-City Americans. After a brief spell in the United Hockey League for the Muskegon Fury during their playoff run, Huppe spent next four seasons in the East Coast Hockey League, where he played for Greenville Grrrowl, Greensboro Generals, Jackson Bandits, Arkansas RiverBlades, Cincinnati Cyclones and the South Carolina Stingrays.

In 2004, Huppe joined the Belfast Giants and quickly became a huge fan favourite at the Odyssey Arena. He represented the Giants for three seasons, helping the side to the Elite League Championship in 2005/06 playing on the giants most successful line with Theo Fleury and Ed Courtenay.

Huppe finished his stint with the Belfast Giants in 2007.

On June 12, 2007, he was announced as having signed for the Coventry Blaze.

On March 9, 2008, Coventry Blaze retained the Elite League Championship, with Huppe scoring the Championship winning goal against the Belfast Giants. Huppe finished the 2008 Elite League season with an impressive 74 points in 58 games, his most productive year to date.

On April 24, 2008, Huppe announced his retirement from Hockey, but was tempted out of retirement by former Coventry Blaze colleague Sylvain Cloutier in December 2008 and went on to play in the CHL for Corpus Christi Icerayz where he played for a couple of months. On April 29, 2009, Huppe signed a contract with the Hull Stingrays as player assistant coach, marking a return to the Elite League and re-uniting him with Cloutier who is now the Head-coach of the Stingrays. it was at the end of this season Huppe decided not to remain with the club and gave his notice for the 2nd year of his 2-year contract and was then signed up by Manchester Phoenix in the English Premier League where he accumulated 61 goals and 54 assists and won another league championship.

On May 16, 2011, Huppe was announced as signing for Guildford Flames Ice Hockey Club who were 2010-11 English Premier League Playoff Winners. It was here Huppe won another league championship in the 11/12 season and again in the 12/13 season. Huppe finally parted ways with the Guildford Flames in November 2014 after returning from injury and signed for the rest of the season with his former team the Belfast Giants playing his first game against Braehead on 28 December 2014. On January 30, 2015, he was released from his contract by the Belfast Giants to return to Milton Keynes.

== Career statistics ==
			Regular season					Playoffs
Season	Team	League	GP	G	A	Pts	PIM	GP	G	A	Pts	PIM
1995–96	Medicine Hat Tigers	WHL	55	5	3	8	24	4	1	0	1	0
1996–97	Medicine Hat Tigers	WHL	68	11	7	18	72	4	0	0	0	0
1997–98	Medicine Hat Tigers	WHL	26	7	4	11	30	—	—	—	—	—
1997–98	Lethbridge Hurricanes	WHL	37	7	17	24	35	2	0	0	0	0
1998–99	Lethbridge Hurricanes	WHL	48	33	23	56	34	—	—	—	—	—
1998–99	Tri-City Americans	WHL	18	12	10	22	10	12	4	2	6	12
1999–00	Tri-City Americans	WHL	17	7	12	19	23	4	0	1	1	2
1999–00	Muskegon Fury	UHL	—	—	—	—	—	11	3	3	6	6
2000–01	Greenville Grrrowl	ECHL	20	4	5	9	2	—	—	—	—	—
2000–01	Greensboro Generals	ECHL	47	18	23	41	23	—	—	—	—	—
2001–02	Jackson Bandits	ECHL	12	1	1	2	2	—	—	—	—	—
2001–02	Arkansas RiverBlades	ECHL	10	1	1	2	6	—	—	—	—	—
2001–02	Cincinnati Cyclones	ECHL	46	20	16	36	14	3	1	0	1	0
2002–03	South Carolina Stingrays	ECHL	72	23	36	59	64	4	0	1	1	2
2003–04	South Carolina Stingrays	ECHL	71	27	27	54	44	7	2	4	6	4
2004–05	Belfast Giants	EIHL	28	16	13	29	28	8	3	2	5	8
2005–06	Belfast Giants	EIHL	33	21	20	41	44	7	6	2	8	4
2006–07	Belfast Giants	EIHL	42	24	28	52	60	—	—	—	—	—
2007–08	Coventry Blaze	EIHL	46	32	32	64	32	4	2	1	3	4
2008–09	Corpus Christi IceRays	CHL	28	8	6	14	16	—	—	—	—	—
2009–10	Hull Stingrays	EIHL	52	19	23	42	36	2	0	0	0	0
2010–11	Manchester Phoenix	EPIHL	54	59	51	110	56	3	2	3	5	2
2011–12	Guildford Flames	EPIHL	35	29	25	54	20	2	1	0	1	0
2012–13	Guildford Flames	EPIHL	50	50	31	81	42	4	4	2	6	0
2013–14	Guildford Flames	EPIHL	8	4	3	7	4	—	—	—	—	—
2014–15	Guildford Flames	EPIHL	5	4	1	5	6	—	—	—	—	—
2014–15	Belfast Giants	EIHL	2	0	0	0	0	—	—	—	—	—
2014–15	Milton Keynes Lightning	EPIHL	16	4	6	10	0	3	3	0	3	0
EIHL totals			203	112	116	228	200	21	11	5	16	16
