= Hull Stingrays =

- City: Kingston upon Hull, England
- League: Elite Ice Hockey League
- Founded: 2003
- Operated: 2003-2015
- Home arena: Hull Arena
- Colours: Blue, Yellow & Black
- Owner: Bobby McEwan
- Captain: Matthew Davies

The Hull Stingrays were a British ice hockey club from Kingston upon Hull who was a member of the Elite Ice Hockey League from 2006 until 2015. They played their home games at Hull Arena.

The Stingrays replaced previous clubs Humberside Seahawks (1988–1999) and Hull Thunder (1999–2003). On 10 August 2010, owners Mike & Sue Pack announced that the club was ceasing operations due to a lack of funds to complete the 2010–11 season, but a takeover by Elite League rivals Coventry Blaze was confirmed on 17 August 2010, enabling the team to take its place in the Elite League for the 2010–11 season. At the end of the 2011–12 season Coventry Blaze announced their intention to sell the Stingrays. The Coventry-based ownership accepted an offer from Stingrays' bench coach Bobby McEwan in May 2012. On 24 June 2015, the club announced on its official website that it has been placed into liquidation.

== History ==
=== Predecessors ===
The city has a long history of ice hockey, with the Seahawks, later named Hawks operating between 1988 and 1999, and were succeeded by the Thunder until 2003.

=== Rebirth ===
The Stingrays were formed in 2003 replacing the Hull Thunder as members of the British National League. The new owners, Mike and Sue Pack along with Rick Strachan, who served as head coach through the end of the 2008–09 season, came with a promise of financial stability.

The initial challenge for the club was to re-establish the belief that the Hull Arena could host a team playing professional hockey at all, following a previous history of controversial failed attempts.

The damage to the sport's credibility in the city was a burden that was not easily shaken off and some of the fans stayed away waiting for what they thought was the inevitable to happen. But the ownership were true to their word and a season was completed without any of the previous crises that had become common place. Stability was established and although success on the ice proved more elusive, as Rick Strachan said at the time "The bus is moving in the right direction." Now stabilized, the club entered the next season in the BNL.

=== 2004/2005 ===
Although still very much having to keep a close eye on the purse strings, the squad had a much stronger feel to it when the first puck dropped on the 2004–05 campaign.

Coach Strachan brought in Scott Wray, Jeff Glowa, Craig Minard and Ladislav Kudrna in nets to join Alipov, Nikolaev, Burgess, Gomenyuk as his eight import contingent and with a strong British content including Slava Koulikov, and the Phillips brothers, hopes were high.

A 'top four finish' was predicted by the coach but this turned out not to be ambitious enough. Stingrays were overtaken for second place in the last fortnight by Guildford and Newcastle, the team made the Winter Cup semi-finals and gained a play-off place.

Amazingly it could have been even better had star defenceman Minard decided not to quit the club in November leaving a young British defence to be marshalled by Gomenyuk. Another blow followed when free-scoring Scott Wray had to return home for personal reasons. Not surprisingly the replacements proved not to be as effective and the team's form suffered.

That season was known for the 'crossover' competition that pitched the British National League teams against their bigger spending, import heavy neighbours in the Elite League. Widely expected to provide one sided games, the reality was a little different and most of the games provided sporting contests worthy of the name.

Although the Stingrays had to endure a couple of bad losses during this competition they also achieved memorable victories over Coventry, London and Sheffield at home, and also took the points off Cardiff on the road. Goalie Kudrna was often the hero and his performances gained him a place, with Gomenyuk on the BNL All-star team.

The crossover competition was planned to be a potential precursor to a closer relationship between the two leagues but, in fact, the reality was far from that – 2004–05 season proved to be the last for the British National League.

Following the culmination of the season; Edinburgh Capitals and Newcastle Vipers decided to resign from the BNL in order to join the premier EIHL. As this would leave the BNL with only five teams; and thus with little option but to fold, the Capitals and Vipers temporarily withdrew their applications so as to allow the remaining BNL teams to apply for EIHL status. However, terms could not be agreed between the EIHL and the remaining five BNL teams; leading the Capitals and Vipers to resubmit their original applications and join the EIHL; which ultimately resulted in the closure of the BNL. This led the Stingrays, along with fellow former BNL members Bracknell Bees and Guildford Flames, to move to the English Premier Ice Hockey League.

=== 2005/2006 – The EPL ===
The Stingrays embarked on what was the only viable option and a team was put together. But with the work permit regulations ruling out re-engaging any of the Ukrainian core of the previous team, the recruitment was going to be key. The season proved to be a tough one and although the club gained a cup-final spot after a memorable 16 shot penalty shoot out victory over the Guildford Flames the club failed to pick up the silverware after being edged out by Bracknell.

A young British contingent struggled against some of the more experienced and mature squads and the mid-table slot felt an under achievement following the previous years progress.

=== 2006/2007 – The EIHL ===
The Packs were unhappy playing their team in the Premier League. Travelling costs were significant for the predominantly south-east based league, and spectator numbers fell. After the end of the 2005–06 season, the Stingrays sought admission into the Elite Ice Hockey League. Their application was approved after weeks of speculation on 22 June 2006. Hull now have a representative in the top-flight division of British Ice Hockey for the first time since the Humberside Hawks played in the Premier Division of the British Hockey League in the 1995–96 season.

The Stingrays had a tough start to their life in the EIHL as they fought to the death for a playoff place, eventually finishing 9th as their decision to opt with a mix of their old Eastern European style with several Canadians ultimately did not pay off.

In 2007 Lifetime Sports Ltd, the Hull Stingrays parent company, established itself as a Community Interest Company. This means that it is a non-profit making organisation dedicated to providing services and facilities to the community in which it operates, that being, Hull, Humberside and the East Riding.

=== 2007/2008 ===
For the 2007–08 season Rick Strachan once again decided to change his signing policy, this time ditching the Eastern European, and predominantly Ukrainian approach, by signing North Americans such as Bryce Thoma, Paul Cabana, Rob Rankin, Brad Patterson, Jake Riddle and Garry Luini. Once again the Stingrays failed to make a consistent impact on the league as they finished in 10th, and last place, 5 points behind 9th placed Basingstoke Bison.

=== 2008/2009 ===
The Stingrays once again finished outside the playoffs in 2008–09, missing out on the post season by seven points, for the third year in a row. At the end of the season, Stingrays coach, Rick Strachan, was asked to step down. Stingrays co-owners Sue and Mike Pack cited financial reasons for the departure of Strachan, who was eventually replaced by Sylvain Cloutier on 9 April 2009. Rick Strachan remains a director of the club. Cloutier is backed up by former teammate Curtis Huppe as Assistant Coach, and both will continue playing.

=== 2009/2010 ===
The Stingrays finished 8th in the 2009–10 Elite League season, gaining 43 points from 56 games, finishing only 3 points behind the 7th place Newcastle Vipers. This is the highest tally for points the team has gained since becoming the Stingrays in 2003, beating the previous record of 39. The team also achieved in excess of .500 hockey in the period from Christmas to the end of the season, the first time it had done so over a sustained period.

=== 2010/2011 ===
Shortly before the 2010–11 EIHL season was about to begin, club owners Mike and Sue Pack announced the team was to no longer operate due to financial issues. However, on 17 August 2010, only six days after the closure of the club was confirmed, a takeover by Elite League rivals Coventry Blaze was confirmed, enabling the team to take its place in the Elite League for the 2010–11 season.

Despite their financial difficulties and a late start to the 2010–11 season (which resulted in the team having to play an unenviable 10 games in 20 days towards the end of the season) Stingrays managed a respectable 7th-place finish in the Elite League. They beat every team in the league except for the Cardiff Devils at least once, including a spectacular 6–1 victory over the Nottingham Panthers in the final game of the regular season. In the playoff quarter-finals Stingrays were defeated by the Devils 8–4 on aggregate.

=== 2011/2012 ===
The 2011–12 pre-season has seen the Stingrays get off to a promising start, beginning with a home victory and an away draw against owners Coventry Blaze, a draw with English Premier League side Sheffield Steeldogs and impressive victories over Dutch sides Geleen Eaters and Tilburg Trappers in the P&O Ferries Cup which saw them crowned champions. Just after Christmas, star forward, Jereme Tendler was suspended by the EIHL and UKDA after failing a drugs test following a game in Coventry. Tendler disputes the claim and is appealing however could be facing a two-year ban if convicted.

== Statistics ==
=== Elite Ice Hockey League Record ===
Season	League		Conference		Playoff	Challenge Cup
2006–07	EIHL	9th				Group
2007–08	EIHL	10th				Group
2008–09	EIHL	9th				Group
2009–10	EIHL	8th			QF	Group
2010–11	EIHL	7th			QF	Group
2011–12	EIHL	7th			SF	Group
2012–13	EIHL	10th	Gardiner	4th		QF
2013–14	EIHL	8th	Gardiner	2nd	QF	Group
2014–15	EIHL	7th	Gardiner	2nd	SF	QF

=== Season-by-season record ===
Hull Stingrays season-by-season record

Season	League	GP	W	L	T	OTL	PTS	League Position	Post-Season
2003–04	British National League	36	4	25	3	4	15	7th	-.-
2004–05	British National League	38	16	19	2	1	35	4th	Qualification Round
2005–06	English Premier Ice Hockey League	48	22	17	0	9	53	8th	Qualification Round
2006–07	Elite Ice Hockey League	54	18	33	0	3	39	9th	-.-
2007–08	Elite Ice Hockey League	54	13	34	0	7	33	10th/Last	-.-
2008–09	Elite Ice Hockey League	54	16	33	0	5	37	9th	-.-
2009–10	Elite Ice Hockey League	56	19	32	0	5	43	8th/Last	Quarter-finals
2010–11	Elite Ice Hockey League	54	23	28	0	5	49	7th	Quarter-finals
2011–12	Elite Ice Hockey League	54	18	34	0	2	36	7th	Semi-finals
2012–13	Elite Ice Hockey League	52	17	26	0	9	43	10th/Last	-.-
2013–14	Elite Ice Hockey League	52	24	24	0	4	52	8th	Quarter-finals
2014–15	Elite Ice Hockey League	52	20	23	0	9	49	7th	Semi-Finals (4th Place)

Note: GP = Games played; W = Wins; L = Losses; T = Ties; OTL = Overtime Losses; PTS = Points;

=== Records ===
- Best Regular Season Finish: 7th out of 10 (2010–11, 2011–12, 2014–15)
- Best EIHL Playoff Finish: Semi-finals (2011–12), 4th Place/semi-finals (2014–15)
- Most Points In A Regular Season: 52 (2013–14)
- Most Wins/Best Record: 24–24–4 (2013–14)
- Best Gardiner Conference Position: 2nd out of 5 (2013–14)
- Highest Challenge Cup Finish: Quarter-finals (2012–13)
- Most Goals In A Regular Season: 178 over 54 games – 3.29 G/GP (2010–11)
- Fewest Goals Allowed Regular Season: 174 over 54 games – 3.22 GAA (2006–07)

== Current roster ==
2013–14 EIHL season

Goaltenders
Number		Player	Catches	Acquired	Place of birth	Previous club
33	(United Kingdom)	Ben Bowns	R	2012	Rotherham, England, UK	Sheffield Steeldogs, EPL

Defencemen
Number		Player	Shoots	Acquired	Place of birth	Previous club
	(United States)	Chad Huttel	R	2013	Hermantown, Minnesota, USA	Free agent
	(Canada)	Matt Suderman	L	2013	Winkler, Manitoba, Canada	Bloomington Blaze, CHL
11	(United Kingdom)	Scott Robson*	L	2012	Beverley, England, UK	Trafford Metros, ENL
6	(Slovakia)	Martin Ondrej	L	2011	Prešov, Slovakia	Kalamazoo Wings, IHL
	(United Kingdom)	Tom Ralph	R	2013	Kingston upon Hull, England, UK	Hull Stingrays NL, NIHL
	(Canada)	Omar Pacha	L	2013	Boucherville, Quebec, Canada	Charmonix

Forwards
Number		Player	Shoots	Acquired	Place of birth	Previous club
	(Canada)	Derek Campbell	L	2013	Nepean, Ontario, Canada	Coventry Blaze, EIHL
	(Canada)	Guillaume Doucet	R	2013	Moncton, New Brunswick, Canada	Morzine-Avoriaz, LMHL
21	(Canada)	Jason Silverthorn	R	2009	Owen Sound, Ontario, Canada	Cardiff Devils, EIHL
27	(Canada)	Jereme Tendler	L	2010	Viceroy, Saskatchewan, Canada	Corpus Christi IceRayz, CHL
83	(Canada)	Sylvain Cloutier	L	2009	Mont-Laurier, Quebec, Canada	Coventry Blaze, EIHL
	(United States)	Sean Muncy	R	2013	Chesterfield, Missouri, USA	Eindhoven Kemphanen, Eredivisie
16	(United Kingdom)	Samuel Towner*	R	2011	Kingston upon Hull, England, UK	Kingston Jets, ENL
26	(United Kingdom)	Matthew Davies	L	2011	Kingston upon Hull, England, UK	Peterborough Phantoms, EPIHL
29	(United Kingdom)	Tom Squires	L	2012	Sheffield, England, UK	Sheffield Steeldogs, EPL
13'	(United Kingdom)	Lee Bonner		2013	England	Hull Stingrays NL, NIHL

- * Denotes two-way contract with Hull Stingrays NIHL – previously known as Kingston Jets

== Honours and achievements ==
As Hull Stingrays.

- Elite Ice Hockey League
  - Playoffs (4): 2009–10, 2010–11, 2011–12 (semi-final) & 2013–2014, 2014 - 2015 (semi-final)
- P&O Ferries Cup
  - Champions: 2011
- English Premier Cup
  - Runners-up (1): 2005–06

Honours achieved under previous names.

- English League
  - Champions (1): 1988–89
- British Division One
  - Champions (1): 1991
- British Championship
  - Runners-up (1): 1993
- Autumn Cup
  - Runners-up (1): 1991

== Owners ==
- Mike Pack and Sue Pack (2003–2010)
- Andy Buxton, Mike Cowley, Paul Thompson and James Pease (2010–2012)
- Bobby McEwan (2012–2015)

== List of Hull Stingrays head coaches ==
- Rick Strachan (2003–2009)
- Sylvain Cloutier (2009–2014)
- Omar Pacha (2014–2015)

== Hull Stingrays coaching records ==
Name	Duration	Regular season				
Name	Duration	GC	W	L	OTL	T
Hull Stingrays
Rick Strachan (pre-EIHL)	2003–2006	122	42	61	14	5
Rick Strachan (EIHL)	2006–2009	162	47	100	15	0
Sylvain Cloutier	2009–2014	268	101	144	25	0
Omar Pacha #2	2014–2015	52	20	23	9	0

== Retired numbers ==
- No. 10 – Stephen Johnson
