= Sheffield Lancers =

Ice hockey team from Sheffield, England

The Sheffield Lancers were an ice hockey club from Sheffield, England that played at the Queens Road Ice Rink between 1974 and 1980. The Lancers initially played in the Southern League before transferring into the English League North in 1978 where they won the league's inaugural title.

In 1980 quite a few of the players relocated to Nottingham and became the second and current version of the Nottingham Panthers. The players who stayed behind formed the core of the Sheffield Sabres ice hockey team.
