= Sunderland Chiefs =

Semi-professional ice hockey team from the UK

The Sunderland Chiefs were a semi-professional Ice Hockey team in the United Kingdom

Founded in 1977 as the Crowtree Chiefs, the team was renamed the Sunderland Chiefs in 1986 . The team was called the Sunderland Indians from 1990 to 1991).

The Chiefs played in the British League Division One from 1986 to 1989, the English League from 1989 to 1990, and since 1991 they played in the English League. The team played their home games at the Crowtree Leisure Centre.

The Chiefs dissolved at the end of the 2004/05 season.
