= Blackpool Seagulls =

- City: Blackpool, England
- League: British Hockey League
- Founded: 1951
- Operated: 1951-1993, 2011-present
- Home arena: Sub Zero Ice Rink, Cleveleys; Capacity: 400; Ice size: 36m x 22m
- Colours: Blue, orange and white
- Head coach: Dave Anthony
- Captain: Gary Shearman
- Website: www.BlackpoolSeagulls.co.uk

Blackpool Seagulls are an English ice hockey team, founded in 1951, who played at the Pleasure Beach Ice Rink, Blackpool. They folded in 1993.

In 2011, the Seagulls were re-formed as a recreational ice hockey team, playing home games at the Sub Zero Ice Rink in Cleveleys.

== History ==
=== Early years ===
The Seagulls were formed in 1951 and played in the Midland Intermediate League from 1951 to 1955. In the 1955–56 season they lost just one match all year. In the 1960s with no official leagues in the UK, "non-league" ice hockey continued with mini-tournaments competed for at the ice rinks of Blackpool, Brighton Tigers, Durham Wasps, Southampton Vikings and Whitley Warriors and also included some teams who did not have a "home ice" at the time such as Harringay Racers, Richmond Flyers and Streatham Redskins.

=== Southern League ===
From 1970 to 1978 they played in the Southern League which was then the top-flight ice hockey league in England. Forward Brian Singer was named in the Southern A League, Midland Section, All-Star Team in 1975–76, and goaltender Dave Cartmell won the same honour for two consecutive seasons in 1977–78 and 1978–79.

=== English League North ===
When the top flight was split into two regional competitions in 1978 they joined the newly formed English League North. They were the English League North Champions two seasons running – 1980–81 and 1981–82. That season they also played in the English National League which had been revived, though it lasted just the one season. It was also one of the more successful seasons in the club's history as they reached the end-of-season British Championships as winners of the English League North alongside English League South champions, Streatham Redskins as well as the top two Scottish sides – Dundee Rockets and Murrayfield Racers, with the Seagulls game being shown on ITV.

In the 1981–82 four out of the six players in the English League North All-Star team were Blackpool Seagulls players – goal tender Andy Sharples, defenceman Steve Currie and forwards (and twin brothers), Canadians Brian and Bruce Simms.

=== British League ===
In 1982 they joined the newly formed British Hockey League (BHL) which had replaced the three top flight regional leagues in the United Kingdom, to form one top-flight league. In 1982–83 they finished second in Section C behind Altrincham Aces.

The Seagulls then joined the newly created second tier of the BHL, the British Hockey League Division One. In their first season in the First Division, 1983–84 they finished in sixth place out of eleven teams. The following season was more successful as the Seagulls finished in third place behind champions Peterborough Pirates and runners-up Solihull Barons.

The 1986–87 season saw the Seagulls finish in the lower half of the Division One table, in 11th out of sixteen teams.

For the 1987–88 season, Division One was split into two regional leagues, each with eight teams. Blackpool were placed in Division One South. However, they had a poor season, ending up in 7th place with only Aviemore Blackhawks, who lost every match they played all season, finishing below them.

=== Final years ===
In 1993, ice hockey came to an end in Blackpool after 42 years, because the rink at the Pleasure Beach was considered to be too small to host competitive ice hockey. For a short while the Seagulls name was retained as the club and some of its players moved to the Blackburn Arena. But within a couple of years the Seagulls name was dropped completely.

=== Return of the Seagulls ===
In 2011 the Seagulls name was revived, with a recreational team that includes former Seagulls import Dave Anthony, who first played for them in 1984, and with a number of former players in the squad. The Seagulls first home game was played on 25 February, against the UK Firefighters team.

== Honours ==
- English League North champions: 1980–81, 1981–82
