= English League North =

UK sports league

The English League North was the top-flight ice hockey league in northern England from 1978, when it alongside the English League South it replaced the Southern League. In 1982, it was replaced by the British Hockey League, running on a national basis. Between 1978 and 1981 the league had been named the Southern League (Midland).

== Champions ==
- 1978/79: Sheffield Lancers
- 1979/80: Liverpool Leopards
- 1980/81: Blackpool Seagulls
- 1981/82: Blackpool Seagulls
