= Richmond Flyers =

- City: London, United Kingdom
- League: British Hockey League
- Founded: 1977
- Operated: 1977-1992
- Home arena: Richmond Ice Rink; Capacity: 1250; Ice size: 200ft x 81ft
- Colours: Blue and gold
- Head coach: Dennis Horne / Alec Goldstone

Franchise history
- 1977–1980: London Phoenix Flyers
- 1980–1992: Richmond Flyers

The Richmond Flyers were an ice hockey team who were founded in 1977 as the London Phoenix Flyers, changing their name to Richmond Flyers in 1980. They competed in the Inter-City League between 1980 and 1982, the British Hockey League between 1982 and 1989, and the English League between 1989 and 1991.

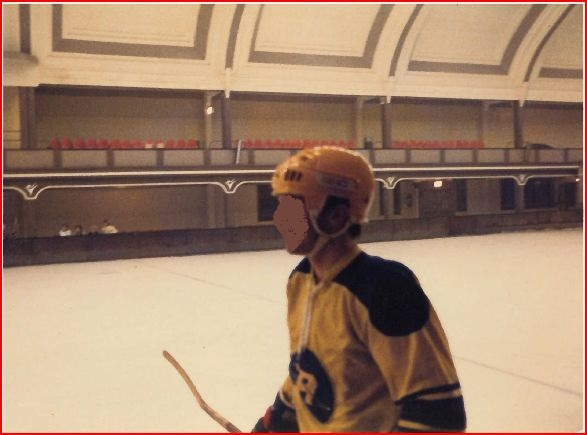
Richmond Flyer player on home ice (Richmond Ice Rink), showing the flying 'R' logo on the home kit, circa 1982

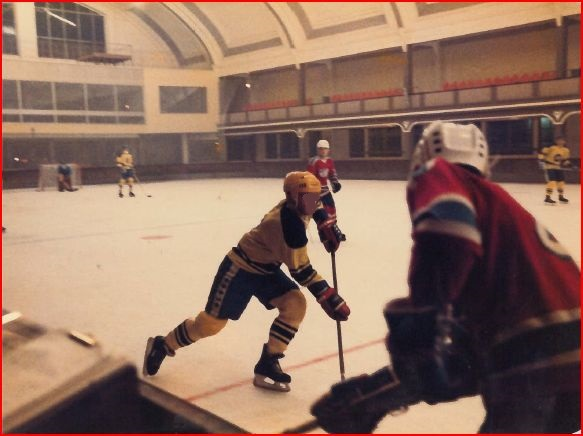
Richmond Flyer player on home ice (Richmond Ice Rink), showing the home kit, circa 1982 and playing against Southampton Vikings

The club ceased to exist from 1992 when their home ice rink, Richmond Ice Rink, was demolished to make way for flats overlooking the River Thames.

London Phoenix Flyers logo

Name	Position	Number	Nationality	Years played
Mark Adams	Defence	?	British	?
Mick Angel	Defence	?	British	1984, 85, 86
Mike (Pip) Allard	?	?	British	?
Martin Bergin	Defence	?	British	1983, 84, 85
Paul Cooney	Defence	8	British	?
Brian Casey	Forward	10	?	1981
John Cimelli	Netminder	?	British	?
Lloyd Clifford	Netminder	?	?	1988, 89
Len Cole	Forward	15	British	1981
Charlie Colon	Netminder	?	American	?
Steve Condron	Defence	?	British	1983, 84, 85
Tony Cooper	Defence	?	British	?
Geoff Delderfield	?	?	British	?
Andre Downs	Netminder	1	American	1981
Elias Elia	Forward	?	British	?
Ross Fleming	Forward	7	Canadian	1977, 78, 79
Nick Fitzpatrick	Forward	12	English	1982, 83, 84
Barry Gage	Defence	9	British	?
Mark Gibson	Defence	?	British	?
Phil Gosbee	Defence	?	British	?
Kevan Grace	Forward	7	?	1981
Robert Graham	Forward	?	American	?
John Grisevich	Netminder	?	?	?
Steve Heath	Forward	?	British	?
John Holtham	Defence	12	British	1981
David Howden	Forward	14	Canadian	79-81
Steve Huggett	Forward	?	British	?
Paul Hughes	Forward	?	British	?
Lee Hurley	Forward	?	British	?
Ron Johnson	Defence	?	British	?
Jukka Korhonen	Forward	?	Finnish	?
Paul Lidster	Defence	2	British	?
Christiaan Low	Centre forward	10	British	1986-88
Dominic Mcgill	Netminder	30	British	?
Tom Moffat	Defence	?	American	?
Dave Newman	Forward	16	British	1981
Tony Nicholson	Forward	?	British	?
Ian Noad	Defence	?	British	?
Andy Nunn	Netminder	?	British	?
Gary Plaistow	Forward	14	British	1981
Robert Plumb	Forward	13	American	1981
Jason Reilly	Forward	?	British	?
Mark Salisbury	Defence	?	British	?
Trevor Salisbury	Defence	?	British	?
Chris Scammon	Defence	5	American	1981
Michael Seabrooke	Forward	3	British	?
Hugh Segre	Forward	?	British	?
James Sheridan	Forward	?	British	?
Alastair Smith	Forward	?	British	1985
Gary Stefan	Forward	?	Canadian	1980-1981
Gilbert Storm	Forward	6	?	1981
Dave Sweeney	Forward	?	British	?
Dan Thomas C	Forward	9	Canadian	1982-1983
Alan Walton	Forward	?	British	?
Kelly Williams	Forward	?	British	?
Bob Williamson	Forward	12	British	1977-1989
Monty Wise	Netminder	?	British	?
Bernie Woolcott	Forward	8	British	1984, 85, 86
Andy Young	Forward	16	British	1985,86,87
Alan Jarvis C	Defence.	13	British	1977
Jon Kieran	Centre	16	Canadian	1980-1981
Ben Acquah	Defence	2	British	1988, 89
