= Southampton Vikings =

Ice hockey team from Southampton, England

The Southampton Vikings were an ice hockey team from Southampton, England. Their home venue was Southampton Ice Rink.

The Vikings were established following the collapse of French side Club Francais Volants. The name 'Vikings' was adopted due to the new team using the shirts of the old French club which had large V logos on them. Southampton's first game was a 10–5 victory over the London All Stars in 1936. The club played only briefly before succumbing to financial problems.

The team was reestablished in 1952 and would win the Southern Intermediate League in their first season. The Vikings continued playing until 1964 when they once again closed. The team returned for a third time in 1976 and would continue playing until the closure of the rink in 1988. During this time the Southampton Vikings played a single season in the Premier Division of the British Hockey League.
