= Inter-City League =

Ice hockey league in England

The Inter-City League, known as the English League South during 1981-82 season, was a top-flight ice hockey league in southern England from 1978. Its clubs were previously members of the Southern League. A proposal by the Southern IHA to create a three divisional structure wasn't acceptable to the southern-based teams who subsequently formed their own league. In 1982, it was replaced by the British Hockey League, running on a national basis.

== Champions ==
- 1978/79: Streatham Redskins
- 1979/80: London Phoenix Flyers
- 1980/81: Streatham Redskins
- 1981/82: Streatham Redskins
