= Todd Bidner =

Canadian ice hockey player (born 1961)

- Born: July 5, 1961 (age 63); Petrolia, Ontario, Canada
- Height: 6 ft 2 in (188 cm)
- Weight: 205 lb (93 kg; 14 st 9 lb)
- Position: Left wing
- Shot: Left
- Played for: Washington Capitals; Fife Flyers; Peterborough Pirates; Nottingham Panthers; Bracknell Bees; Humberside Seahawks; Teesside Bombers; Durham Wasps; Humberside Hawks
- National team: Great Britain
- NHL draft: 110th overall, 1980; Washington Capitals
- Playing career: 1981–2002

Richard Todd Bidner (born July 5, 1961) is a Canadian retired ice hockey centre. He played 12 games in the National Hockey League with the Washington Capitals during the 1981–82 season. The rest of his career, which lasted from 1981 to 2002, was mainly spent in the British Hockey League.

== Biography ==
Bidner was born in Petrolia, Ontario. Drafted in 1980 by the Washington Capitals, Bidner played 12 games with the Capitals. He spent most of his playing career playing in Great Britain.

In August 2006 it was announced that Bidner would become the new assistant coach of the London Knights of the Ontario Hockey League. On February 17, 2012, Bidner was hired to replace Sean Gillam as head coach of the SPHL's Fayetteville FireAntz.

== Career statistics ==
=== Regular season and playoffs ===
			Regular season					Playoffs
Season	Team	League	GP	G	A	Pts	PIM	GP	G	A	Pts	PIM
1978–79	Toronto Marlboros	OMJHL	64	10	12	22	64	—	—	—	—	—
1979–80	Toronto Marlboros	OMJHL	68	22	26	48	69	—	—	—	—	—
1980–81	Toronto Marlboros	OHL	67	34	43	77	124	—	—	—	—	—
1980–81	Hershey Bears	AHL	1	0	0	0	0	—	—	—	—	—
1981–82	Washington Capitals	NHL	12	2	1	3	7	—	—	—	—	—
1981–82	Hershey Bears	AHL	30	6	12	18	28	—	—	—	—	—
1981–82	Wichita Wind	CHL	15	2	9	11	17	7	1	2	3	9
1982–83	Moncton Alpines	AHL	59	15	12	27	64	—	—	—	—	—
1983–84	Moncton Alpines	AHL	60	17	16	33	75	—	—	—	—	—
1984–85	Nova Scotia Oilers	AHL	4	2	2	4	4	—	—	—	—	—
1984–85	Adirondack Red Wings	AHL	74	22	35	57	61	—	—	—	—	—
1985–86	Fife Flyers	BHL	31	71	52	123	116	5	7	10	17	10
1986–87	Peterborough Pirates	BD1	29	79	112	191	95	—	—	—	—	—
1987–88	Peterborough Pirates	BHL	30	50	52	102	86	—	—	—	—	—
1988–89	Peterborough Pirates	BHL	33	76	67	143	70	—	—	—	—	—
1989–90	Peterborough Pirates	BHL	13	21	17	38	16	—	—	—	—	—
1989–90	Telford Tigers	BD1	13	23	42	65	32	—	—	—	—	—
1990–91	Telford Tigers	BD1	16	25	24	49	42	—	—	—	—	—
1990–91	Nottingham Panthers	BHL	20	20	28	48	67	6	4	4	8	10
1991–92	Bracknell Bees	BHL	19	20	20	40	70	—	—	—	—	—
1991–92	Humberside Seahawks	BHL	17	21	21	42	50	4	4	3	7	12
1992–93	Humberside Seahawks	BHL	13	15	18	33	26	—	—	—	—	—
1992–93	Telford Tigers	BD1	15	22	26	48	92	—	—	—	—	—
1993–94	Teesside Bombers	BHL	36	49	31	80	108	—	—	—	—	—
1994–95	Durham Wasps	BHL	30	30	27	57	141	5	3	2	5	4
1995–96	Durham Wasps	BHL	21	9	12	21	72	1	0	0	0	0
1995–96	Humberside Hawks	BHL	4	4	4	8	4	—	—	—	—	—
1996–97	Guildford Flames	EPIHL	5	2	3	5	2	—	—	—	—	—
1996–97	Blackburn Hawks	NPIHL	8	14	17	31	6	10	9	17	26	22
1997–98	Amarillo Rattlers	WPHL	6	1	2	3	7	—	—	—	—	—
1999–00	Peterborough Pirates	BNL	—	—	—	—	—	5	2	1	3	39
2001–02	Petrolia Squires	OHA Sr	14	6	5	11	6	—	—	—	—	—
BHL totals			267	386	349	735	826	29	32	33	65	42
NHL totals			12	2	1	3	7	—	—	—	—	—
