= Mike Rowe (ice hockey) =

Canadian ice hockey defenceman

- Born: March 8, 1965 (age 60); Kingston, Ontario, Canada
- Height: 6 ft 1 in (185 cm)
- Weight: 209 lb (95 kg; 14 st 13 lb)
- Position: Defenceman
- Shot: Left
- Played for: Pittsburgh Penguins; Whitley Warriors; Fife Flyers; Murrayfield Racers
- NHL draft: 58th overall, 1983; Pittsburgh Penguins
- Playing career: 1984–1995

Michael A. Rowe (born March 8, 1965) is a Canadian former professional ice hockey defenceman who played eleven games in the National Hockey League for the Pittsburgh Penguins between 1985 and 1986. He also played in the British Hockey League between 1988 and 1995.

== Career statistics ==
=== Regular season and playoffs ===
			Regular season					Playoffs
Season	Team	League	GP	G	A	Pts	PIM	GP	G	A	Pts	PIM
1980–81	Hawkesbury Hawks	CJHL	47	5	13	18	183	—	—	—	—	—
1981–82	Toronto Marlboros	OHL	58	4	4	8	214	10	0	0	0	63
1982–83	Toronto Marlboros	OHL	64	4	29	33	262	4	0	1	1	29
1983–84	Toronto Marlboros	OHL	59	9	36	45	208	9	0	5	5	45
1984–85	Pittsburgh Penguins	NHL	6	0	0	0	7	—	—	—	—	—
1984–85	Toronto Marlboros	OHL	66	17	34	51	202	5	2	2	4	29
1984–85	Baltimore Skipjacks	AHL	—	—	—	—	—	3	0	0	0	0
1985–86	Pittsburgh Penguins	NHL	3	0	0	0	4	—	—	—	—	—
1985–86	Baltimore Skipjacks	AHL	67	0	5	5	107	—	—	—	—	—
1986–87	Pittsburgh Penguins	NHL	2	0	0	0	0	—	—	—	—	—
1986–87	Baltimore Skipjacks	AHL	79	1	18	19	64	—	—	—	—	—
1987–88	Muskegon Lumberjacks	IHL	80	8	21	29	137	6	0	0	0	13
1988–89	Whitley Warriors	BHL	35	34	86	120	122	5	6	5	11	24
1989–90	Fife Flyers	BHL	29	22	30	52	107	5	1	4	5	24
1990–91	Basingstoke Beavers	BD1	36	39	63	102	239	—	—	—	—	—
1990–91	Murrayfield Racers	BHL	—	—	—	—	—	7	6	7	13	18
1991–92	Whitley Warriors	BHL	36	32	48	80	146	7	2	7	9	12
1992–93	Whitley Warriors	BHL	34	17	61	78	100	6	1	7	8	10
1993–94	Whitley Warriors	BHL	43	16	53	69	110	5	0	1	1	23
1994–95	Whitley Warriors	BHL	37	9	30	39	100	—	—	—	—	—
BHL totals			214	130	308	438	685	35	16	31	47	111
NHL totals			11	0	0	0	11	—	—	—	—	—
