= Al Sims =

Canadian ice hockey player and coach

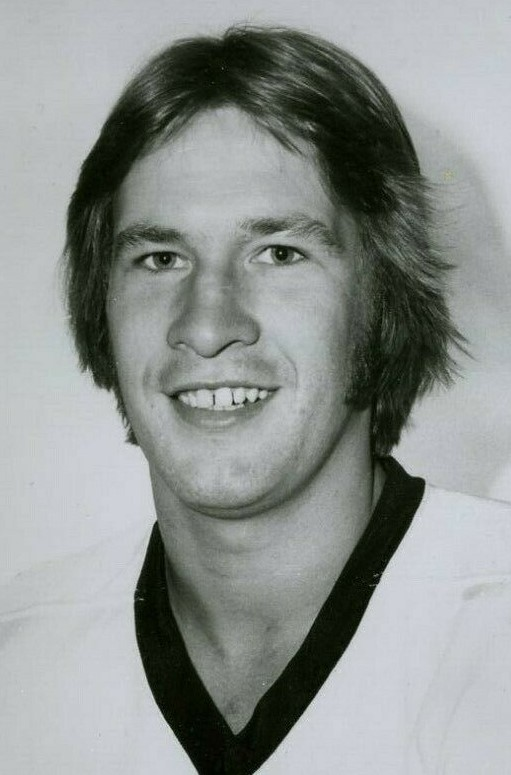
- Born: April 18, 1953 (age 73) Toronto, Ontario, Canada
- Height: 6 ft 0 in (183 cm)
- Weight: 182 lb (83 kg; 13 st 0 lb)
- Position: Defence
- Shot: Left
- Played for: Boston Bruins; Hartford Whalers; Los Angeles Kings
- NHL draft: 47th overall, 1973; Boston Bruins
- WHA draft: 16th overall, 1973; New York Golden Blades
- Playing career: 1973–1989

Allan Eugene Sims (born April 18, 1953) is a Canadian former professional hockey player and head coach in the National Hockey League (NHL). He played ten seasons in the NHL between 1973 and 1983 with the Boston Bruins, Hartford Whalers, Los Angeles Kings. He featured in three Stanley Cup Finals with the Bruins (1974, 1977, 1978).

After retiring he turned to coaching, and remained in this role from 1988 to 2016 in various minor leagues. Sims also served as the head coach of the San Jose Sharks in the NHL during the 1996-97 season.

== Playing career ==
In 1972, Sims was the second-round (and first-ever) draft pick of the New York Raiders of the World Hockey Association, but chose to sign with the Boston Bruins who had drafted him in the third round. At Cornwall, Ontario, in Junior Hockey he had played with Bob Murray, a rushing defenceman. When he played for Boston he was paired for two years with the greatest rushing defenceman of all time, Bobby Orr. He played for Boston and its American Hockey League affiliate for six seasons, and then for the Hartford Whalers for the next two.

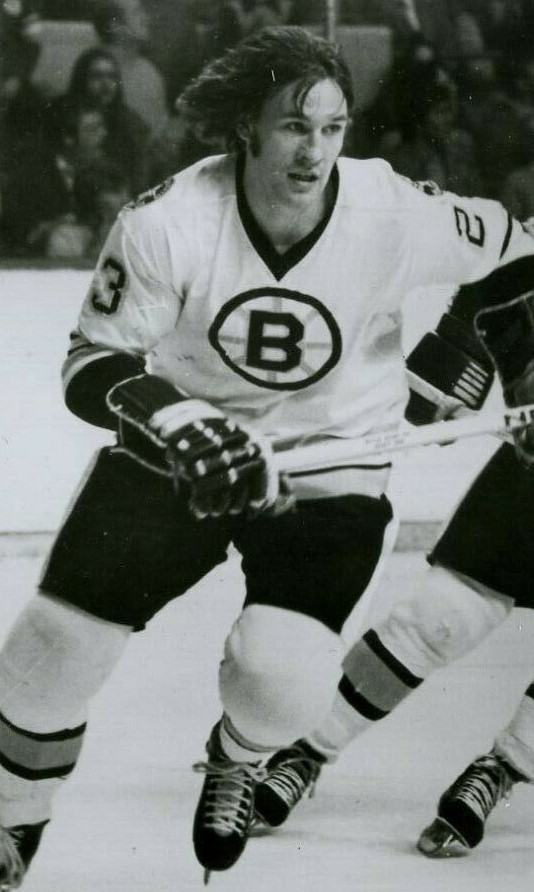
Sims with the Boston Bruins

== Coaching career ==
After Sims' retirement from the NHL, he played and coached hockey with Fife Flyers in Scotland. Later he coached in the International League and won the Turner Cup with the Fort Wayne Komets in 1993. Sims was named assistant coach under Ron Wilson with the Mighty Ducks of Anaheim 1993-1996 before he became head coach of the San Jose Sharks for the 1996–97 NHL season.

Sims then became head coach of the Milwaukee Admirals of the IHL for three years, from 1998 to 2000, moved on to the Central Hockey League for four years and to the Wilkes-Barre/Scranton Penguins as an assistant coach for a year. In 2007–2008, Sims coached the Fort Wayne Komets of the new IHL to his second Turner Cup championship, beating the Port Huron Icehawks 4 games to 3 after a triple-OT seventh and deciding game. After that, he led them to another Turner Cup in the 2008–09 season. In the following year (2009–10), Sims led the Komets to their third straight (and his personal fourth straight, counting the 1992–93 season) Turner Cup. With the team returning to the CHL after the IHL dissolved, it was eliminated in the second round of the 2010-11 postseason before winning the league in 2011–12. However, the Komets failed to make the postseason in 2012–13, with the team in the ECHL, his final season as their head coach. Sims' final minor league head coaching job came with the Evansville IceMen of the ECHL; he took over during the 2014–15 season and coached them in 2015–16, failing to make the postseason either year. The team was declared dormant in 2016–17 in preparation for moving elsewhere, which turned out to be Jacksonville, Florida in 2017–18, and a new head coach took over.

== Career statistics ==
=== Regular season and playoffs ===
			Regular season					Playoffs
Season	Team	League	GP	G	A	Pts	PIM	GP	G	A	Pts	PIM
1971–72	Cornwall Royals	QMJHL	58	6	24	30	65	16	2	9	11	15
1971–72	Cornwall Royals	MC	—	—	—	—	—	3	0	0	0	2
1972–73	Cornwall Royals	QMJHL	62	13	62	75	54	12	2	5	7	8
1973–74	Boston Bruins	NHL	76	3	9	12	22	16	0	0	0	12
1974–75	Boston Bruins	NHL	75	4	8	12	73	—	—	—	—	—
1975–76	Boston Bruins	NHL	48	4	3	7	43	1	0	0	0	0
1975–76	Rochester Americans	AHL	21	4	5	9	12	7	1	4	5	11
1976–77	Boston Bruins	NHL	1	0	0	0	0	2	0	0	0	0
1976–77	Rochester Americans	AHL	80	10	32	42	42	12	2	9	11	12
1977–78	Boston Bruins	NHL	43	2	8	10	6	8	0	0	0	0
1977–78	Rochester Americans	AHL	31	6	13	19	12	—	—	—	—	—
1978–79	Boston Bruins	NHL	67	9	20	29	28	11	0	2	2	0
1978–79	Rochester Americans	AHL	3	0	1	1	4	—	—	—	—	—
1979–80	Hartford Whalers	NHL	76	10	31	41	30	3	0	0	0	2
1980–81	Hartford Whalers	NHL	80	16	36	52	68	—	—	—	—	—
1981–82	Los Angeles Kings	NHL	8	1	1	2	16	—	—	—	—	—
1981–82	New Haven Nighthawks	AHL	51	4	27	31	53	—	—	—	—	—
1982–83	Los Angeles Kings	NHL	1	0	0	0	0	—	—	—	—	—
1982–83	New Haven Nighthawks	AHL	76	18	50	68	46	12	3	3	6	10
1984–85	Genève–Servette HC	SUI–2	—	—	—	—	—	—	—	—	—	—
1984–85	EV Landshut	GER	16	8	12	20	28	4	0	4	4	10
1984–85	New Haven Nighthawks	AHL	13	3	6	9	2	—	—	—	—	—
1985–86	BSC Preussen	GER–2	45	27	47	74	106	—	—	—	—	—
1986–87	Fife Flyers	GBR	36	52	86	138	95	5	6	11	17	0
1987–88	Fife Flyers	GBR	30	33	42	75	51	6	5	11	16	2
1988–89	Fort Wayne Komets	IHL	61	7	30	37	32	6	2	2	4	2
NHL totals			475	49	116	165	286	41	0	2	2	14
AHL totals			275	45	134	179	171	31	6	16	22	33

=== NHL coaching statistics ===
Team	Year	Regular season						Postseason
Team	Year	G	W	L	T	Pts	Finish	Result
SJ	1996-97	82	27	47	8	62	7th in Pacific	Missed Playoffs

== Personal ==
Sims' son Tyler was the starting goaltender of the Providence College Friars in Hockey East (2004 to 2008), and a reserve goalie for several minor league teams (2007 to 2011).

Preceded by Jim Wiley	Head coach of the San Jose Sharks; 1996-97	Succeeded by Darryl Sutter
