= David Quinn (ice hockey) =

American ice hockey coach (born 1966)

- Born: July 30, 1966 (age 59) Cranston, Rhode Island, U.S.
- Height: 6 ft 1 in (185 cm)
- Weight: 205 lb (93 kg; 14 st 9 lb)
- Position: Defense
- Shot: Left
- Played for: Binghamton Rangers; Cleveland Lumberjacks
- Coached for: Pittsburgh Penguins; San Jose Sharks; New York Rangers
- NHL draft: 13th overall, 1984; Minnesota North Stars
- Playing career: 1991–1993
- Coaching career: 1993–present

David Quinn (born July 30, 1966) is an American professional ice hockey coach and former player who is the assistant coach for the New York Rangers of the National Hockey League (NHL). He was previously the head coach of the Rangers and San Jose Sharks of the NHL, the Lake Erie Monsters of the American Hockey League (AHL), assistant coach for the Colorado Avalanche of the NHL, and head coach at Boston University. He was formally inducted into the Rhode Island Hockey Hall of Fame in 2021.

== Career ==
=== Playing career ===
After his prep career at the Kent School, he was drafted in the first round, 13th overall, by the Minnesota North Stars in the 1984 NHL entry draft.

Quinn forwent turning professional immediately after being drafted, and instead played collegiately for Boston University. After his junior season, he tried out for the 1988 U.S. Olympic Team. However, during his tryout he was diagnosed with Haemophilia B (also known as Christmas disease), a rare disorder which prevents blood from clotting properly. Due to the disorder, Quinn was forced to retire from the game.

Quinn was later able to find funding for expensive medication to combat the disease, and he was given a tryout for the 1992 U.S. Olympic team. He did not make the team, but he did attract the attention of the New York Rangers, who signed him to his first professional contract in February 1992. Quinn finished the 1991–92 season with the Rangers' American Hockey League affiliate, the Binghamton Rangers. He then played the entire 1992–93 season with the Cleveland Lumberjacks of the International Hockey League. He retired following that season, however, without ever making the National Hockey League.

=== Coaching career ===
After retiring from playing, Quinn began a career as a coach. After serving as an assistant coach for Northeastern University, Quinn joined a start-up program at the University of Nebraska-Omaha. After helping build the program at Omaha for six years, Quinn left to become a developmental coach for USA Hockey. He then worked as an assistant at his alma mater, Boston University, helping the Terriers to the National Title in 2009.

On June 22, 2009, Quinn was introduced as head coach for the Lake Erie Monsters of the American Hockey League (AHL), affiliate of the Colorado Avalanche of the National Hockey League (NHL). It marked a return to Cleveland where he played with the Lumberjacks of the IHL. He coached Lake Erie from 2009 to 2012. On June 14, 2012, Quinn was named as an assistant coach for the Colorado Avalanche of the NHL.

On March 25, 2013, Quinn was named the eleventh head coach of Boston University, replacing Jack Parker.

On May 23, 2018, the New York Rangers announced that Quinn was hired as head coach. On October 11, Quinn picked up his first NHL regular season win, against the San Jose Sharks. On May 12, 2021, the Rangers fired Quinn after the team failed to make the playoffs.

In December 2021, Quinn was named as the head coach for the United States senior team for the 2022 Winter Olympics after Pittsburgh Penguins head coach Mike Sullivan could not proceed with the NHL pulling out of the Olympics.

On July 26, 2022, Quinn was named head coach of the San Jose Sharks, returning to the NHL.

On March 4, 2023, Quinn was ejected for the first time of his NHL coaching career in an 8–3 loss to the Washington Capitals. His ejection was the first NHL head coach ejection since Jon Cooper on March 3, 2022, and the first Sharks head coach since Peter DeBoer on November 24, 2018.

After the Sharks finished last in the league in his second season, Quinn was fired on April 24, 2024.

On June 12, 2024, Quinn was named assistant coach of the Pittsburgh Penguins, coaching alongside longtime friend and former Boston University teammate Mike Sullivan. After Sullivan departed the Penguins at the end of the 2024–25 season, Quinn subsequently joined him as an assistant coach with the New York Rangers, returning to the franchise four years after being fired as head coach.

Quinn served as Sullivan's assistant during the 2026 Winter Olympics, where the United States won gold medals after defeating Canada 2–1 in overtime.

== Career statistics ==
=== Regular season and playoffs ===
			Regular season					Playoffs
Season	Team	League	GP	G	A	Pts	PIM	GP	G	A	Pts	PIM
1982–83	Kent School	HS-Prep	23	10	20	30		—	—	—	—	—
1983–84	Kent School	HS-Prep	25	12	20	32	26	—	—	—	—	—
1984–85	Boston University	HE	30	3	11	14	26	—	—	—	—	—
1985–86	Boston University	HE	37	2	20	22	58	—	—	—	—	—
1986–87	Boston University	HE	27	1	11	12	34	—	—	—	—	—
1991–92	Binghamton Rangers	AHL	19	0	0	0	6	2	0	0	0	0
1992–93	Cleveland Lumberjacks	IHL	60	8	13	21	102	3	0	0	0	0
HE totals			94	6	42	48	118	—	—	—	—	—
Professional totals			79	8	13	21	108	5	0	0	0	0

=== International ===
Year	Team	Event	GP	G	A	Pts	PIM
1986	United States	WJC	7	1	3	4	8

== Head coaching record ==
=== NHL ===
Team	Year	Regular season						Postseason			
Team	Year	G	W	L	OTL	Pts	Finish	W	L	Win%	Result
NYR	2018–19	82	32	36	14	78	7th in Metropolitan	—	—	—	Missed playoffs
NYR	2019–20	70	37	28	5	79	7th in Metropolitan	0	3	.000	Lost in qualifying round (CAR)
NYR	2020–21	56	27	23	6	60	5th in East	—	—	—	Missed playoffs
SJS	2022–23	82	22	44	16	60	7th in Pacific	—	—	—	Missed playoffs
SJS	2023–24	82	19	54	9	47	8th in Pacific	—	—	—	Missed playoffs
Total		372	137	185	50			0	3	.000	1 playoff appearance

=== NCAA ===
Record table
Season	Team	Overall	Conference	Standing	Postseason
Boston University Terriers (Hockey East) (2013–2018)
2013–14	Boston University	10–21–4	5–12–3	9th	
2014–15	Boston University	28–9–5	14–5–3	1st	NCAA Runner Up
2015–16	Boston University	21–13–5	12–6–4	5th	NCAA West Regional semifinal
2016–17	Boston University	24–12–3	13–6–3	T-1st	NCAA West Regional Final
2017–18	Boston University	22–14–4	12–8–4	4th	NCAA Northeast Regional Final
Boston University:		105–69–21	56–37–17		
Total:		105–69–21			
National champion Postseason invitational champion Conference regular season champion Conference regular season and conference tournament champion Division regular season champion Division regular season and conference tournament champion Conference tournament champion

== Awards and honors ==
Award	Year	Ref
All-Hockey East First Team	1985–86	
Hockey East All-Tournament team	1986	

Sporting positions
Preceded by Brian Lawton	Minnesota North Stars first-round draft pick 1984	Succeeded by Warren Babe
Preceded by Alain Vigneault	Head coach of the New York Rangers; 2018–2021	Succeeded by Gerard Gallant
Preceded by Bob Boughner	Head coach of the San Jose Sharks; 2022–2024	Succeeded by Ryan Warsofsky
Awards and achievements
Preceded by Jerry York	Bob Kullen Coach of the Year Award; 2014–15	Succeeded by Nate Leaman
