= Mike Vellucci =

American ice hockey player and coach

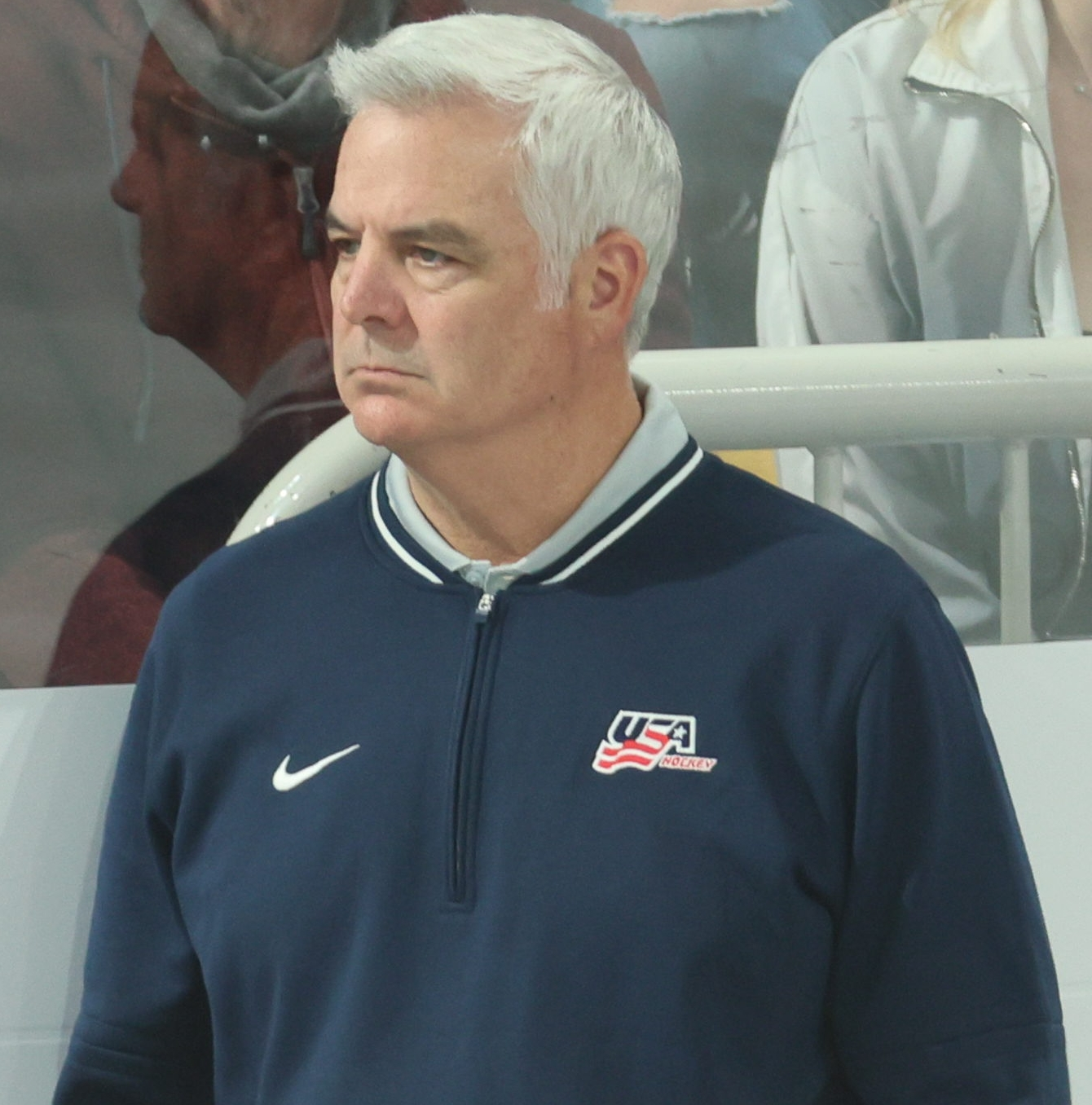
- Vellucci in 2025
- Born: August 11, 1966 (age 60) Farmington, Michigan, U.S.
- Height: 6 ft 1 in (185 cm)
- Weight: 180 lb (82 kg; 12 st 12 lb)
- Position: Defense
- Shot: Left
- Played for: Hartford Whalers
- NHL draft: 131st overall, 1984; Hartford Whalers
- Playing career: 1986–1995

Michael George Vellucci (born August 11, 1966) is an American former professional ice hockey player. He is currently an assistant coach of the Chicago Blackhawks in the National Hockey League (NHL). In 2025, Vellucci served as an assistant coach for the United States men's national ice hockey team at the IIHF World Championship, helping guide the team to its first gold medal since 1933. Previously, he was an assistant coach for the Pittsburgh Penguins for five seasons, and the head coach and general manager of the Wilkes-Barre/Scranton Penguins in the American Hockey League for one season. Prior to that he was head coach of the Charlotte Checkers in the American Hockey League for two seasons winning the Calder Cup in 2018–19. He was also head coach and general manager of the Plymouth Whalers in the Ontario Hockey League for 14 seasons.

== Playing career ==
Vellucci played major junior with the Belleville Bulls of the Ontario Hockey League from 1983 to 1986. During the summer of 1984 he was in a car driven by teammate Al Iafrate when it crashed and flipped multiple times. Vellucci was thrown from the car and broke his back. He missed the entire 1984–85 season as a result.

Selected 131st overall in the 1984 NHL entry draft by the Hartford Whalers, Vellucci played professionally in the IHL, AHL, ECHL and BHL from 1986 to 1989. Vellucci appeared in two games in the National Hockey League in 1987–88.

== Management & Coaching career ==
Vellucci was with the Detroit Compuware Ambassadors of the North American Hockey League (NAHL) from 1994 to 1999, where his teams went 241–82–27 in the regular season and captured U.S. national championships in 1994 and 1999. The Ambassadors also captured two NAHL regular season titles and four Robertson Cups.

Vellucci coached the Plymouth Whalers of the Ontario Hockey League (OHL) from 2001 to 2008, winning the Matt Leyden Trophy as OHL Coach of the Year in 2007 becoming the first American to win. That same season, he led the Whalers to the J. Ross Robertson Cup and a berth in the 2007 Memorial Cup. He was also named the OHL's Coach of the Year and Executive of the Year in 2012–13. Vellucci stepped down as head coach of the Whalers in December 2007, as he wanted more time to concentrate on his general manager duties, and he was replaced by Greg Stefan. Stefan coached the club until November 2008, when he resigned to take a job with the Carolina Hurricanes of the NHL, and Vellucci took over the coaching duties once again.

Vellucci left the Whalers after the 2013–14 season and took a job as an assistant general manager and director of player development with the Carolina Hurricanes of the National Hockey League. After three seasons, he became the head coach of the Hurricanes' American Hockey League (AHL) affiliate, the Charlotte Checkers in 2017. In his second season as the Checkers head coach, Vellucci won 2019 AHL's Coach of the Year award. The Checkers won the 2019 Calder Cup under Vellucci, beating the defending champion Toronto Marlies in the conference finals and the Chicago Wolves in the finals. This was the Checkers' first Calder Cup finals appearance and win.

On June 28, 2019, Vellucci parted ways with the Hurricanes organization. On the same day, he was announced as the head coach of the Wilkes-Barre/Scranton Penguins, the Pittsburgh Penguins' AHL affiliate.

On September 2, 2020, Vellucci was named an assistant coach of the Pittsburgh Penguins.

On April 22, 2025, Vellucci was named an assistant coach of the United States men's national ice hockey team for the 2025 IIHF World Championship in Denmark and Sweden, where he was responsible for the team's power play unit. The U.S. captured the gold medal, defeating Switzerland in the final. It marked the United States’ first IIHF World Championship gold since 1933. The American power play, overseen by Vellucci, operated at an efficiency of 32.35%, one of the best in the tournament, and was considered a key factor in the team's success.

On May 28, 2025, it was reported by Frank Seravalli of DailyFaceoff.com that Vellucci was closing in on signing on to be an assistant coach with the Chicago Blackhawks. The signing was confirmed by the team on June 2nd

== Personal life ==
Mike and his wife, Sue, have 2 children, Allison and Ryan. Vellucci's son was drafted by Saginaw Spirit in the OHL. He was the captain for the Johnstown Tomahawks and currently plays for Adrian College. Vellucci's daughter worked for the Charlotte Checkers, Chicago Wolves and Florida Everblades as a broadcaster and social media manager, she currently works for the PGA TOUR.

== Career statistics ==
=== Regular season and playoffs ===
			Regular season					Playoffs
Season	Team	League	GP	G	A	Pts	PIM	GP	G	A	Pts	PIM
1982–83	Detroit Compuware Ambassadors	NAHL		23	20	43	98	—	—	—	—	—
1983–84	Belleville Bulls	OHL	67	2	20	22	83	3	1	0	1	16
1985–86	Belleville Bulls	OHL	64	11	32	43	154	24	2	5	7	45
1986–87	Salt Lake Golden Eagles	IHL	60	5	30	35	94	—	—	—	—	—
1987–88	Milwaukee Admirals	IHL	66	7	18	25	202	—	—	—	—	—
1987–88	Binghamton Whalers	AHL	3	0	0	0	2	—	—	—	—	—
1987–88	Hartford Whalers	NHL	2	0	0	0	11	—	—	—	—	—
1988–89	Indianapolis Ice	IHL	12	1	2	3	43	—	—	—	—	—
1988–89	Binghamton Whalers	AHL	37	9	9	18	59	—	—	—	—	—
1989–90	Whitley Warriors	BHL	5	1	5	6	41	—	—	—	—	—
1989–90	Phoenix Roadrunners	IHL	4	0	0	0	5	—	—	—	—	—
1989–90	Winston-Salem Thunderbirds	ECHL	10	2	7	9	21	—	—	—	—	—
1989–90	Erie Panthers	ECHL	22	7	20	27	57	7	1	4	5	6
1990–91	EHC Lustenau	AUT-2	—	—	—	—	—	—	—	—	—	—
1991–92	Michigan Falcons	CoHL	56	17	33	50	103	5	0	1	1	2
1994–95	London Wildcats	CoHL	7	0	0	0	29	—	—	—	—	—
IHL totals			142	13	50	63	344	—	—	—	—	—
NHL totals			2	0	0	0	11	—	—	—	—	—

== Coaching record ==
Team	Year	Regular season							Postseason
Team	Year	G	W	L	T	OTL	Pts	Finish	Result
PLY	2001–02	68	39	15	12	2	92	1st in West	Lost in Conference Quarterfinals
PLY	2002–03	68	43	14	9	2	97	1st in West	Lost in Conference Finals
PLY	2003–04	68	32	24	9	3	76	2nd in West	Lost in Conference Semifinals
PLY	2004–05	68	30	29	6	3	69	2nd in West	Lost in Conference Quarterfinals
PLY	2005–06	68	35	28	—	5	75	1st in West	Lost in Conference Semifinals
PLY	2006–07	68	49	14	—	5	103	1st in West	Won J. Ross Robertson Cup
PLY	2007–08	29	18	8	—	3	39	(resigned)	—
PLY	2008–09	49	31	15	—	3	65	2nd in West	Lost in Conference Semifinals
PLY	2009–10	68	38	27	—	3	79	2nd in West	Lost in Conference Semifinals
PLY	2010–11	68	36	26	—	6	78	3rd in West	Lost in Conference Semifinals
PLY	2011–12	68	47	18	—	3	97	1st in West	Lost in Conference Semifinals
PLY	2012–13	68	42	17	—	9	93	1st in West	Lost in Conference Finals
PLY	2013–14	68	28	33	—	7	63	1st in West	Lost in Conference Quarterfinals
Total		826	468	268	36	54			

=== AHL ===
Team	Year	Regular season						Postseason			
Team	Year	G	W	L	OTL	Pts	Finish	W	L	Win %	Result
Charlotte	2017–18	76	46	26	4	96	3rd in Atlantic	4	4	.500	Lost in Division Finals
Charlotte	2018–19	76	51	17	7	110	1st in Atlantic	15	4	.789	Won Calder Cup
AHL total		152	97	43	11	206		19	8	.704	2 playoff appearances

Preceded by Peter DeBoer	Head coaches of the Plymouth Whalers; 2001–2008	Succeeded by Greg Stefan
Preceded by Greg Stefan	Head coaches of the Plymouth Whalers; 2008–2014	Succeeded by Don Elland
Preceded by Ulf Samuelsson	Head coaches of the Charlotte Checkers; 2017–2019	Succeeded by Ryan Warsofsky
Preceded by Clark Donatelli	Head coaches of the Wilkes-Barre/Scranton Penguins; 2019–2020	Succeeded by J.D. Forrest
