= Warsofsky =

Warsofsky is a surname. Notable people with this surname include:

- David Warsofsky (born 1990), American ice hockey player, brother of Ryan
- Ryan Warsofsky (born 1987), American ice hockey coach
