= Greg Stefan =

Canadian ice hockey player and coach

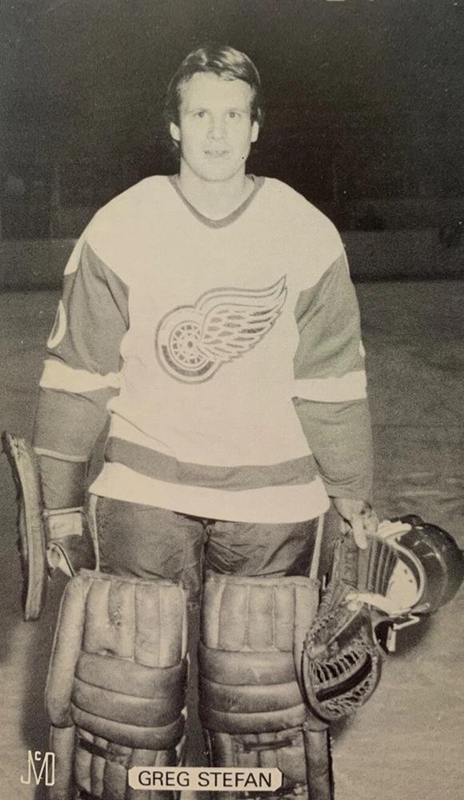
- Born: February 11, 1961 (age 65) Brantford, Ontario, Canada
- Height: 5 ft 11 in (180 cm)
- Weight: 180 lb (82 kg; 12 st 12 lb)
- Position: Goaltender
- Caught: Left
- Played for: Adirondack Red Wings (AHL); Detroit Red Wings (NHL)
- NHL draft: 128th overall, 1981; Detroit Red Wings
- Playing career: 1981–1990

Gregory Steven Stefan (born February 11, 1961, in Brantford, Ontario) is a retired professional ice hockey goaltender in the National Hockey League (NHL) and currently serves as the goaltending coach for the Flint Firebirds in the Ontario Hockey League.

Greg Stefan was a goaltender who shared netminding duties with Glen Hanlon during the 1986-1987 and 1987-1988 seasons, when the Detroit Red Wings reached the Stanley Cup conference finals in back-to-back campaigns. Stefan was a left-handed catching goalie.

== Biography ==
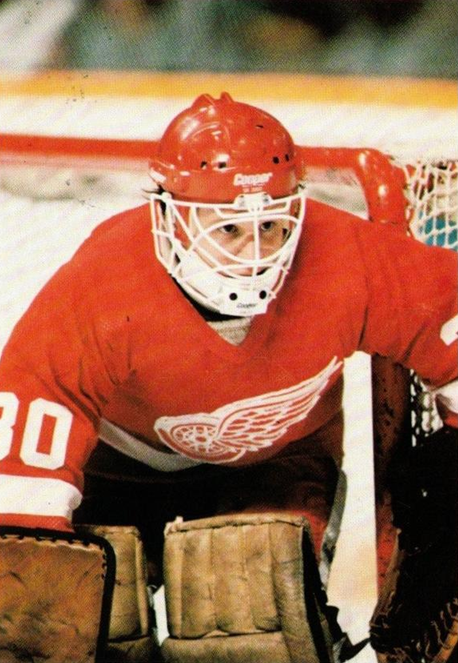
1987 photo of Stefan in action for Detroit Red Wings

As a youth, Stefan played in the 1974 Quebec International Pee-Wee Hockey Tournament with a minor ice hockey team from Brantford which included Wayne Gretzky and Len Hachborn.

Drafted in the 1981 NHL entry draft by the Detroit Red Wings, Stefan became known for using his stick to clear skaters in front of the net, many times receiving penalties, and sometimes suspensions. He is also known for having played Pee Wee level hockey on the same team as Wayne Gretzky. He played in 299 games, winning 115 of them, before suffering an eventual career-ending knee injury in a game against the Edmonton Oilers.

Stefan began his coaching career in 1993 with the Detroit Jr. Red Wings of the Ontario Hockey League in 1993, and contributed to the team's first OHL championship in 1995. He remained with the club, which had relocated from Detroit to Plymouth, Michigan, and became the Plymouth Whalers, until 1998, before taking a job with the Carolina Hurricanes of the National Hockey League. After moving around the Hurricanes system as a scout, and even as an assistant coach, Stefan returned to Plymouth in December 2007 to become the head coach of the club, taking over for Mike Vellucci, who would solely focus on his general manager duties.

The Whalers posted a record of 16–20–3 under Stefan, after starting the season with an 18–8–3 record under Vellucci, however, the team would make the playoffs as the eighth seed in the Western Conference. In the first round of the post-season, the Whalers were quickly eliminated by the Kitchener Rangers in four games. Stefan came back to Plymouth for a second season in 2008–09, however, after a start of 6–11–2, he resigned from the position to return to the Carolina Hurricanes organization as a scout. In 2006, Stefan won the Stanley Cup as goalie coach and scout with the Carolina Hurricanes.

== Career statistics ==
=== Regular season and playoffs ===
| | | | Regular season | | | | | | | | | Playoffs |
| Season | Team | League | GP | W | L | T | MIN | GA | SO | GAA | SV% | GP | W | L | MIN | GA | SO | GAA | SV% |
|---|---|---|---|---|---|---|---|---|---|---|---|---|---|---|---|---|---|---|---|
| 1978–79 | Oshawa Generals | OMJHL | 33 | — | — | — | 1635 | 133 | 0 | 4.88 | — | — | — | — | — | — | — | — | — |
| 1979–80 | Oshawa Generals | OMJHL | 17 | 8 | 6 | 0 | 897 | 58 | 0 | 3.88 | — | — | — | — | — | — | — | — | — |
| 1980–81 | Oshawa Generals | OHL | 46 | 23 | 14 | 3 | 2407 | 174 | 0 | 4.34 | — | 6 | 2 | 3 | 298 | 20 | 0 | 4.02 | — |
| 1981–82 | Detroit Red Wings | NHL | 2 | 0 | 2 | 0 | 120 | 10 | 0 | 5.00 | — | — | — | — | — | — | — | — | — |
| 1981–82 | Adirondack Red Wings | AHL | 29 | 11 | 13 | 3 | 1571 | 99 | 2 | 3.78 | — | 1 | 0 | 0 | 20 | 0 | 0 | 0.00 | — |
| 1982–83 | Detroit Red Wings | NHL | 35 | 6 | 16 | 9 | 1847 | 139 | 0 | 4.52 | .853 | — | — | — | — | — | — | — | — |
| 1983–84 | Detroit Red Wings | NHL | 50 | 19 | 22 | 2 | 2600 | 152 | 2 | 3.51 | .876 | 3 | 1 | 2 | 210 | 8 | 0 | 2.29 | .907 |
| 1984–85 | Detroit Red Wings | NHL | 46 | 21 | 19 | 3 | 2635 | 190 | 0 | 4.33 | .860 | 3 | 0 | 3 | 138 | 17 | 0 | 7.39 | .754 |
| 1985–86 | Detroit Red Wings | NHL | 37 | 10 | 20 | 5 | 2068 | 155 | 1 | 4.50 | .856 | — | — | — | — | — | — | — | — |
| 1986–87 | Detroit Red Wings | NHL | 43 | 20 | 17 | 3 | 2351 | 135 | 1 | 3.45 | .875 | 9 | 4 | 5 | 508 | 24 | 0 | 2.83 | .905 |
| 1987–88 | Detroit Red Wings | NHL | 33 | 17 | 9 | 5 | 1854 | 96 | 1 | 3.11 | .896 | 10 | 5 | 4 | 531 | 32 | 1 | 3.62 | .864 |
| 1988–89 | Detroit Red Wings | NHL | 46 | 21 | 17 | 3 | 2499 | 167 | 0 | 4.01 | .871 | 5 | 2 | 3 | 294 | 18 | 0 | 3.67 | .881 |
| 1989–90 | Detroit Red Wings | NHL | 7 | 1 | 5 | 0 | 359 | 24 | 0 | 4.01 | .837 | — | — | — | — | — | — | — | — |
| 1989–90 | Adirondack Red Wings | AHL | 3 | 1 | 0 | 1 | 128 | 7 | 0 | 3.28 | .887 | — | — | — | — | — | — | — | — |
| 1990–91 | Adirondack Red Wings | AHL | 2 | 0 | 1 | 0 | 66 | 7 | 0 | 6.36 | .759 | — | — | — | — | — | — | — | — |
| NHL totals | | | 299 | 115 | 127 | 30 | 16333 | 1068 | 5 | 3.92 | .868 | 30 | 12 | 17 | 1681 | 99 | 1 | 3.53 | .875 |

== Coaching record ==
| Team | Year | Regular season | | | | | | | Postseason |
| Team | Year | G | W | L | T | OTL | Pts | Finish | Result |
|---|---|---|---|---|---|---|---|---|---|
| PLY | 2007–08 | 39 | 16 | 20 | – | 3 | 74 | 5th in West | Lost in First Round |
| PLY | 2008–09 | 19 | 6 | 11 | – | 2 | 14 | 5th in West | Resigned |

| Preceded by Mike Vellucci | Head coaches of the Plymouth Whalers; 2007–2009 | Succeeded by Mike Vellucci |
