= Bob Boughner =

Canadian ice hockey player and coach

- Born: March 8, 1971 (age 55) Windsor, Ontario, Canada
- Height: 6 ft 0 in (183 cm)
- Weight: 206 lb (93 kg; 14 st 10 lb)
- Position: Defence
- Shot: Right
- Played for: Buffalo Sabres; Nashville Predators; Pittsburgh Penguins; Calgary Flames; Carolina Hurricanes; Colorado Avalanche
- Coached for: San Jose Sharks; Florida Panthers
- NHL draft: 32nd overall, 1989; Detroit Red Wings
- Playing career: 1991–2006
- Coaching career: 2009–present

Robert Darren Boughner (/ˈbuːɡnər/ BOOG-nər; born March 8, 1971), nicknamed "The Boogieman", is a Canadian professional ice hockey coach and former player who is currently an assistant coach for the New York Islanders of the National Hockey League (NHL). As head coach of the Windsor Spitfires in the Ontario Hockey League, Boughner won two Memorial Cup Canadian major junior national championships, in 2009 and 2010 and won the CHL's Brian Kilrea Coach of the Year Award twice, in 2008 and 2009.

== Playing career ==
=== Junior hockey ===
==== Sault Ste. Marie Greyhounds (1988–1991) ====
Boughner grew up in the Windsor area playing minor hockey and played as a 15-year-old with the Belle River Canadiens Jr. C club. He moved away at age 16 to play for the St. Marys Lincolns Jr. B team in 1987–88. One of Boughner's teammates with the Lincolns was former NHL head coach Dan Bylsma. The following year Boughner was drafted by the OHL's Sault Ste. Marie Greyhounds with the sixth overall selection.

In his first year with the Greyhounds in 1988–89, Boughner appeared in 64 games, scoring six goals and 21 points, while earning 182 penalty minutes, however, the club failed to qualify for the postseason.

Boughner saw his offensive production increase during the 1989–90 season, as he scored seven goals and 30 points in only 49 games, however, the rebuilding Greyhounds failed to make the playoffs for the second consecutive season.

In 1990–91, Boughner once again improved offensively, scoring 13 goals and 46 points in 64 games, while registering 156 penalty minutes, the second highest on the Greyhounds, helping Sault Ste. Marie make the playoffs. In the postseason, Boughner appeared in all 14 games, scoring two goals and 11 points, as the Greyhounds won the OHL championship, defeating the Oshawa Generals in the final round, and earn a berth in the 1991 Memorial Cup. At the Memorial Cup, Boughner was held pointless in three games, as Sault Ste. Marie finished fourth in the four team tournament.

=== Professional career ===
==== Detroit Red Wings (1991–1994) ====
Boughner was drafted by the Detroit Red Wings in the second round, 32nd overall, in the 1989 NHL entry draft.

The Red Wings assigned Boughner to their ECHL affiliate, the Toledo Storm, for the 1991–92 season. In 28 games with the Storm, Boughner scored three goals and 13 points, and in five playoff games, Boughner chipped in with two goals. Bougher also saw very limited action with the Red Wings AHL affiliate, the Adirondack Red Wings, in 1991–92, as he appeared in only one game, getting no points, while registering seven penalty minutes.

Boughner spent the entire 1992–93 with Adirondack, appearing in 69 games, scoring a goal and 17 points, as well as 190 penalty minutes, which was the fourth highest total on the team. Boughner did not appear in any playoff games due to injuries.

With more ice time in 1993–94 with Adirondack, Boughner saw his offensive production increase, scoring eight goals and 22 points in 72 games. Boughner also accumulated 292 penalty minutes, second highest on the team. In the postseason, Boughner had a goal and two points in 10 games.

Following the season, Boughner was granted free agency.

==== Florida Panthers (1994–1996) ====
On July 25, 1994, Boughner signed with the Florida Panthers as a free agent. The Panthers assigned Boughner to the Cincinnati Cyclones of the IHL for the 1994–95 season.

In 81 games with Cincinnati, Boughner had two goals and 16 points, and had 192 penalty minutes, second highest total on the team, helping the Cyclones reach the postseason. In 10 playoff games, Boughner had no points.

In 1995–96, the Panthers assigned Boughner to their AHL affiliate, the Carolina Monarchs, where in 46 games, Boughner had two goals and 17 points, and 127 penalty minutes.

On February 1, 1996, the Panthers traded Boughner to the Buffalo Sabres for the Sabres third round draft choice in the 1996 NHL entry draft.

==== Buffalo Sabres (1996–1998) ====
After acquiring Boughner from the Florida Panthers on February 1, 1996, the Sabres decided to promote him to the NHL for the remainder of the 1995–96 season.

On February 3, Boughner made his NHL debut, getting no points and 12 penalty minutes, in a 4–2 loss to the Boston Bruins. On February 23, Boughner recorded his first career point, an assist, in the Sabres 7–2 victory over the Philadelphia Flyers. Boughner remained with the Sabres for the rest of the season, earning just the one assist in 31 games, as well as 104 penalty minutes, however, Buffalo failed to make the playoffs.

Boughner stayed in Buffalo for the 1996–97 season, and on February 21, 1997, in his 85th career game, Boughner scored his first career NHL goal against Éric Fichaud of the New York Islanders in a 5–2 Sabres victory. On March 11, Boughner recorded his first multi-point game, earning two assists, in a 3–2 win over the Philadelphia Flyers. Overall, Boughner had one goal and eight points in 77 games, and had 225 penalty minutes, as Buffalo reached the playoffs. Boughner played in his first career playoff game on April 17, earning no points in a 3–1 win over the Ottawa Senators. On May 3, Boughner earned his first playoff point, an assist, in a 5–3 loss to the Philadelphia Flyers. In 11 postseason games, Boughner had one assist, and nine penalty minutes.

In 1997–98, Boughner had a goal and four points in 69 games, and had the third highest penalty minute total on the team with 165, as Buffalo reached the playoffs for the second straight season. In 14 playoff games, Boughner had four assists.

On June 26, 1998, the Sabres left Boughner unprotected for the 1998 NHL Expansion Draft, and the Nashville Predators selected him.

==== Nashville Predators (1998–2000) ====
Boughner played in the Nashville Predators first ever game on October 10, 1998, as he was held pointless in a 1–0 loss to the Florida Panthers. On October 31, he earned his first point as a Predator, an assist, in a 3–2 win over the Colorado Avalanche. Boughner scored his first goal with Nashville on December 26, beating Olaf Kolzig of the Washington Capitals, in a 3–1 Predators victory. Overall, Boughner had three goals and 13 points in 79 games during the 1998–99, as the expansion club failed to reach the playoffs.

Boughner began the 1999–2000 season with Nashville, as he scored two goals and six points in 62 games.

On March 13, 2000, the Predators traded Boughner to the Pittsburgh Penguins for Pavel Skrbek.

==== Pittsburgh Penguins (2000–2001) ====
Boughner finished the 1999–2000 season with the Pittsburgh Penguins, and in his first game with the club on March 16, 2000, he scored the game-winning goal on the power play against Trevor Kidd of the Florida Panthers in a 4–2 Penguins victory. In 11 games with Pittsburgh, Boughner recorded just the one goal. In the postseason, Boughner had two assists in 11 games.

In 2000–01, Boughner had a goal and four points in 58 games, as his 147 penalty minutes were the second highest on the Penguins, as the club reached the postseason. In 18 playoff games, Boughner had an assist, as Pittsburgh lost to the New Jersey Devils in the Conference finals.

After the season, Boughner was granted free agency.

==== Calgary Flames (2001–2003) ====
On July 2, 2001, Boughner signed with the Calgary Flames, giving the young, rebuilding club a solid veteran presence.

On October 3, 2001, Boughner played in his first career game with the Flames, going pointless in a 1–0 victory over the Edmonton Oilers. On October 13, Boughner earned his first goal and added an assist for his first points with Calgary, beating Ed Belfour of the Dallas Stars, in a 4–3 Flames victory. He finished the season with two goals and six points, with a team high 170 penalty minutes in 79 games, however, the Flames failed to reach the playoffs. For the latter half of the season, Boughner served as co-captain of the team alongside Craig Conroy.

In 2002–03, Boughner had the best offensive season of his NHL career, scoring three goals and 17 points in 69 games, however, the Flames missed the playoffs once again.

On July 16, 2003, the Flames traded Boughner and a fourth-round draft pick in the 2004 NHL entry draft to the Carolina Hurricanes for a fifth-round pick in the 2005 NHL entry draft.

==== Carolina Hurricanes (2003–2004) ====
Due to injuries at the start of the 2003–04 season, Boughner did not appear in his first game with the Carolina Hurricanes until October 28, 2003, where he was held pointless in a 3–0 victory over the San Jose Sharks. He earned his first point with the Hurricanes on November 28, an assist, in a 4–2 loss to the Philadelphia Flyers.

In 43 games with Carolina, Boughner had five assists. He was traded to the Colorado Avalanche for Chris Bahen, a fourth-round draft pick and a fifth-round draft pick in the 2004 NHL entry draft.

==== Colorado Avalanche (2004–2006) ====
Boughner finished the 2003–04 season with the Colorado Avalanche, and appeared in his first game with the team on February 22, 2004, earning no points in a 3–1 win over the Minnesota Wild. In 11 games with Colorado, Boughner was kept off the score sheet, as the Avalanche reached the playoffs. In his first career playoff game with the team, Boughner had two assists in a 3–1 win over the Dallas Stars on April 7. Overall, in 11 playoff games, Boughner had four assists.

Boughner did not play any hockey during the 2004–05 season due to the NHL lockout which cancelled the entire season.

In 2005–06, Boughner scored a goal and seven points in 42 games, however, he saw his ice time cut drastically, averaging only 7:15 per game.

On June 15, 2006, Boughner announced his retirement from the NHL.

== Coaching career ==
Boughner headed a new ownership group in purchasing the then-struggling Windsor Spitfires in February 2006. He has been head coach of the team, as well as President & C.E.O., except during the 2010–11 season when Boughner served as an assistant coach with the Columbus Blue Jackets.

In 2007–08, he coached the Spitfires to the second best regular season finish in their history with 94 points, and was honored as OHL and CHL Coach of the Year. On April 15, 2009, Boughner was named the OHL's coach of the year for the second year in a row.

On May 8, 2009, he coached the Windsor Spitfires to their first OHL championship in 21 years after finishing the regular season with a league best 115 points. Also, that same year went on to win Windsor's first Memorial Cup, becoming the first team to lose the first two games of the tournament and still win the Cup. Boughner's Spitfires successfully defended their Memorial Cup championship in 2010.

On June 24, 2009, he was selected by Hockey Canada to coach the National Under-18 hockey team at the Memorial of Ivan Hlinka Tournament. The team went on to dominate by going undefeated and won gold at the tournament.

On June 12, 2017, he was named the head coach of the Florida Panthers, having served as an assistant coach for the San Jose Sharks for the previous two seasons. On April 7, 2019, the Panthers fired Boughner after the team failed to qualify for the playoffs for the second straight season. He rejoined the Sharks as an assistant on May 29.

On December 11, 2019, Boughner was named the Sharks' interim head coach after Peter DeBoer was fired. On September 22, 2020, he became the Sharks' permanent head coach. After three seasons straight of missing the playoffs, Boughner was subsequently fired by the Sharks organization on July 1, 2022.

On July 8, 2022, Boughner was named an associate coach for the Detroit Red Wings. He was relieved of his duties as associate coach following the firing of head coach Derek Lalonde on December 26, 2024.

In the 2025 offseason, the New York Islanders hired Boughner as an assistant under Patrick Roy to focus on defense and penalty kill.

== Personal life ==
Boughner married Sara Morgan in July 2024 and has four children from a previous marriage. Sara Morgan is the founder and CEO of Eleven Eleven PR, a boutique hospitality-focused PR firm with offices in DC and LA. Bob is originally from Windsor, ON.

== Career statistics ==
| | | | Regular season | | | | | Playoffs |
| Season | Team | League | GP | G | A | Pts | PIM | GP | G | A | Pts | PIM |
|---|---|---|---|---|---|---|---|---|---|---|---|---|
| 1986–87 | Belle River Canadiens | GLJHL | 37 | 3 | 11 | 14 | 88 | — | — | — | — | — |
| 1987–88 | St. Marys Lincolns | WOHL | 36 | 4 | 18 | 22 | 177 | — | — | — | — | — |
| 1988–89 | Sault Ste. Marie Greyhounds | OHL | 64 | 6 | 15 | 21 | 182 | — | — | — | — | — |
| 1989–90 | Sault Ste Marie Greyhounds | OHL | 49 | 7 | 23 | 30 | 122 | — | — | — | — | — |
| 1990–91 | Sault Ste. Marie Greyhounds | OHL | 64 | 13 | 33 | 46 | 156 | 14 | 2 | 9 | 11 | 35 |
| 1991–92 | Toledo Storm | ECHL | 28 | 3 | 10 | 13 | 79 | 5 | 2 | 0 | 2 | 15 |
| 1991–92 | Adirondack Red Wings | AHL | 1 | 0 | 0 | 0 | 7 | — | — | — | — | — |
| 1992–93 | Adirondack Red Wings | AHL | 69 | 1 | 16 | 17 | 190 | — | — | — | — | — |
| 1993–94 | Adirondack Red Wings | AHL | 72 | 8 | 14 | 22 | 292 | 10 | 1 | 1 | 2 | 18 |
| 1994–95 | Cincinnati Cyclones | IHL | 81 | 2 | 14 | 16 | 192 | 10 | 0 | 0 | 0 | 18 |
| 1995–96 | Carolina Monarchs | AHL | 46 | 2 | 15 | 17 | 127 | — | — | — | — | — |
| 1995–96 | Buffalo Sabres | NHL | 31 | 0 | 1 | 1 | 104 | — | — | — | — | — |
| 1996–97 | Buffalo Sabres | NHL | 77 | 1 | 7 | 8 | 225 | 11 | 0 | 1 | 1 | 9 |
| 1997–98 | Buffalo Sabres | NHL | 69 | 1 | 3 | 4 | 165 | 14 | 0 | 4 | 4 | 15 |
| 1998–99 | Nashville Predators | NHL | 79 | 3 | 10 | 13 | 137 | — | — | — | — | — |
| 1999–2000 | Nashville Predators | NHL | 62 | 2 | 4 | 6 | 97 | — | — | — | — | — |
| 1999–2000 | Pittsburgh Penguins | NHL | 11 | 1 | 0 | 1 | 69 | 11 | 0 | 2 | 2 | 15 |
| 2000–01 | Pittsburgh Penguins | NHL | 58 | 1 | 3 | 4 | 147 | 18 | 0 | 1 | 1 | 22 |
| 2001–02 | Calgary Flames | NHL | 79 | 2 | 4 | 6 | 170 | — | — | — | — | — |
| 2002–03 | Calgary Flames | NHL | 69 | 3 | 14 | 17 | 126 | — | — | — | — | — |
| 2003–04 | Carolina Hurricanes | NHL | 43 | 0 | 5 | 5 | 80 | — | — | — | — | — |
| 2003–04 | Colorado Avalanche | NHL | 11 | 0 | 0 | 0 | 8 | 11 | 0 | 4 | 4 | 6 |
| 2005–06 | Colorado Avalanche | NHL | 41 | 1 | 6 | 7 | 54 | — | — | — | — | — |
| NHL totals | | | 630 | 15 | 57 | 72 | 1,382 | 65 | 0 | 12 | 12 | 67 |

== Head coaching record ==
=== NHL ===
| Team | Year | Regular season | | | | | | Postseason |
| Team | Year | G | W | L | OTL | Pts | Finish | Result |
|---|---|---|---|---|---|---|---|---|
| FLA | 2017–18 | 82 | 44 | 30 | 8 | 96 | 4th in Atlantic | Missed playoffs |
| FLA | 2018–19 | 82 | 36 | 32 | 14 | 86 | 5th in Atlantic | Missed playoffs |
| SJS | 2019–20 | 37 | 14 | 20 | 3 | (31) | 8th in Pacific | Missed playoffs |
| SJS | 2020–21 | 56 | 21 | 28 | 7 | 49 | 7th in West | Missed playoffs |
| SJS | 2021–22 | 82 | 32 | 37 | 13 | 77 | 6th in Pacific | Missed playoffs |
| Total | | 339 | 147 | 147 | 45 | | | |

=== OHL ===
| Team | Year | Regular season | | | | | | | Postseason |
| Team | Year | G | W | L | SL | OTL | Pts | Finish | Result |
|---|---|---|---|---|---|---|---|---|---|
| WSR | 2006–07 | 68 | 18 | 43 | 2 | 5 | 43 | 5th in West | Missed playoffs |
| WSR | 2007–08 | 68 | 41 | 15 | 7 | 5 | 94 | 2nd in West | Lost in first round |
| WSR | 2008–09 | 68 | 57 | 10 | 0 | 1 | 115 | 1st in West | Won OHL Championship and Memorial Cup |
| WSR | 2009–10 | 68 | 50 | 12 | 5 | 1 | 106 | 1st in West | Won OHL Championship and Memorial Cup |
| WSR | 2011–12 | 68 | 29 | 32 | 5 | 2 | 65 | 4th in West | Lost in first round |
| WSR | 2012–13 | 68 | 26 | 33 | 3 | 6 | 61 | 5th in West | Missed playoffs |
| WSR | 2013–14 | 68 | 37 | 28 | 3 | 0 | 77 | 2nd in West | Lost in first round |
| WSR | 2014–15 | 68 | 24 | 40 | 2 | 2 | 52 | 5th in West | Missed playoffs |
| Total | | 544 | 282 | 213 | 27 | 22 | | | |

== Awards and honors ==
- Matt Leyden Trophy: 2007–08, 2008–09
- Brian Kilrea Coach of the Year Award: 2007–08, 2008–09

Sporting positions
| Preceded by Dave Lowry | Calgary Flames captain 2002; With: Craig Conroy | Succeeded by Craig Conroy |
| Preceded by Tom Rowe | Head coach of the Florida Panthers; 2017–2019 | Succeeded by Joel Quenneville |
| Preceded by Peter DeBoer | Head coach of the San Jose Sharks; 2019–2022 | Succeeded by David Quinn |
