= Sean Gillam =

Canadian ice hockey player (born 1976)

- Born: May 7, 1976 (age 50) Lethbridge, Alberta, Canada
- Height: 6 ft 2 in (188 cm)
- Weight: 220 lb (100 kg; 15 st 10 lb)
- Position: Defence
- Shot: Right
- Played for: AHL; Adirondack Red Wings; ECHL; Mississippi Sea Wolves; Jackson Bandits; CHL; Rio Grande Valley Killer Bees
- NHL draft: 75th overall, 1994; Detroit Red Wings
- Playing career: 1996–2006

Sean Gillam (born May 7, 1976) is a retired Canadian professional ice hockey defenceman. He was selected by the Detroit Red Wings in the third round (75th overall) of the 1994 NHL entry draft.

On June 13, 2011, Gillam was announced as the new head coach for the Fayetteville FireAntz in the Southern Professional Hockey League (SPHL).

Gillam was released on February 17, 2012, and replaced by Todd Bidner. At the time, the FireAntz had the worst record in the SPHL, at 12–25–5, and only 5–14–2 at home. The team also had the league's highest number of goals allowed, with 183, for an average of 4.4 per game.

== Awards ==
- WHL West Second All-Star Team – 1995 & 1996
