= George Kingston (ice hockey) =

Canadian ice hockey coach (born 1939)

- Born: August 20, 1939 (age 85); Biggar, Saskatchewan, Canada
- Occupation: Former head coach of the San Jose Sharks (1991-93)

George Kingston (born August 20, 1939) is a Canadian ice hockey coach. He was the long-time coach of the University of Calgary hockey team, and coached the Canadian Men's Team to a gold medal at the 1988 Spengler Cup as well as coaching the Canadian men's national ice hockey team at the 1994 Ice Hockey World Championships and winning the first gold medal for Canada in 33 years. He was named a 2019 Order of Hockey in Canada recipient.

== Biography ==
Born in Biggar, Saskatchewan, Kingston played hockey as a youth, and was signed by the Detroit Red Wings of the National Hockey League in 1953. However, he decided to attend the University of Alberta instead. He had to quit hockey due to shoulder injuries, and in 1967, was hired by the University of Calgary as an assistant coach. Named head coach in 1968, he served in that role until 1986, also becoming an assistant professor. At Calgary he had a 245–128 record and led the university to five Western Canadian University championships. While coaching at Calgary he also completed a master's degree, and in 1977 finished a PhD; his dissertation was based on travels to Europe to study coaching, and was titled "The Organization and Development of Ice Hockey during Childhood in the Soviet Union, Czechoslovakia, Sweden and Canada".

Kingston was a volunteer with Hockey Canada programming for ten years, including roles with the 1980, 1984, 1988 and 1994 Olympic teams. His success at the University of Calgary led Kingston to offers as an assistant coach in the National Hockey League, where he served as an assistant for the Calgary Flames from 1980 to 1982 and the Minnesota North Stars during the 1988–89 NHL season. In 1989, Kingston was appointed the head coach of the Norway men's national ice hockey team, which he held until 1991.

After two years in Norway, which included a best-ever finish for the junior national team and a significant improvement and solid preparation for Norway which hosted the Lillehammer Olympics, Kingston was named as the head coach of the expansion San Jose Sharks. The Sharks posted a 28–129–7 record in two seasons under Kingston's watch, and he was released following the 1992–93 NHL season. Following this, Kingston was hired as director of hockey operations with responsibilities to serve as general manager and mentor coach for the Canadian Olympic team at the 1994 Winter Olympics, where Canada won silver. Kingston then went on to be the head coach of Team Canada at the World Championships in Bolzano/Milano, winning the gold medal in the tournament. The success at the World Championship did not go unnoticed, as following the tournament, Kingston became coach of the Germany men's national ice hockey team, which enjoyed a number of successes, including participating in the final round of the World Cup of Hockey in 1996. In 1999, Kingston was hired by another NHL expansion team, this time becoming an assistant coach for the Atlanta Thrashers. After two years in Atlanta, he joined the Florida Panthers as an assistant in 2001, coaching there until 2007.

He next coached Norway's national women's team and laid the foundation with very young players who moved up the ladder in international hockey, and assisted the men's national team in qualifying for the Vancouver Olympics, as well as being a special consultant to the Norwegian Ice Hockey Federation and Olympiatoppen, the Norwegian Olympic Program. He was assistant coach of Norway men's sledgehockey team, a bronze medal winner at the Vancouver Paralympics in Vancouver.

== Coaching style ==
Kingston developed a reputation as a "teaching coach", in that he was interested in showing players how to play better, and not just giving instructions as was common in the 1960s and 1970s. Kingston was interested in the developments made in the Soviet Union towards coaching, and in 1971 spent five months in Europe learning coaching techniques, including three and a half weeks in the USSR, even being allowed to watch national team practices. He took a sabbatical in 1974–75 and returned to Europe, spending time in the Soviet Union, Czechoslovakia, and Sweden to see how their hockey programs worked. This formed the basis of his PhD research. In 1976 he was one of six people assigned by the International Ice Hockey Federation (IIHF) to study a team at the 1976 Canada Cup, and wrote a report on his observations for further study. Kingston has done extensive research into all aspects of the game of hockey, and is well-known through the combination of coaching, research, and presenting his work in IIHF, NHL and numerous world hockey forums. He serves as a volunteer managing director of the NHL Coaches' Association, and as an assistant coach of Lithuania national ice hockey team.

== NHL coaching statistics ==
Team	Year	Regular season						Post season
Team	Year	G	W	L	T	Pts	Finish	Result
SJ	1991-92	80	17	58	5	39	6th in Smythe	Missed Playoffs
SJ	1992-93	84	11	71	2	24	6th in Smythe	Missed Playoffs
Total		164	28	129	7			

Preceded by Position created	Head coach of the San Jose Sharks; 1991–93	Succeeded by Kevin Constantine
