= Cap Raeder =

American ice hockey player and coach

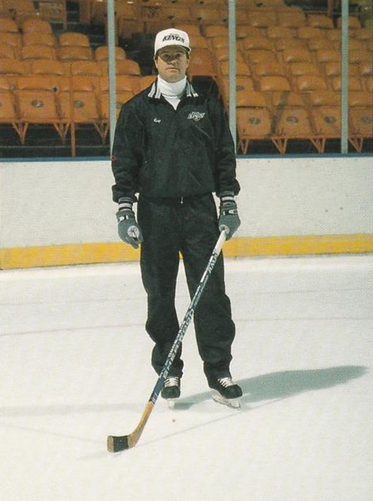
- Raeder in 1988 postcard as part of the Los Angeles Kings coaching staff
- Born: October 8, 1953 (age 72) Needham, Massachusetts, U.S.
- Height: 6 ft 0 in (183 cm)
- Weight: 180 lb (82 kg; 12 st 12 lb)
- Position: Goaltender
- Caught: Right
- Played for: New England Whalers
- NHL draft: 167th overall, 1973; Montreal Canadiens
- WHA draft: 64th overall, 1973; New England Whalers
- Playing career: 1975–1980

Robert "Cap" Raeder (born October 8, 1953) is an American former ice hockey goaltender and coach.

Raeder briefly played in the World Hockey Association (WHA) for the New England Whalers from 1975 to 1977 after starring for the University of New Hampshire men's ice hockey team in the early 1970s. His best year as a professional was in 1976 when he had the lowest goals against average of all goaltenders in the WHA playoffs. Based on the strength of that performance, he was later selected to the United States team at the inaugural 1976 Canada Cup. He later served as an interim head coach of the San Jose Sharks for one game in 2002, before taking a scouting position with the Sharks. In 2008, Raeder was hired as an assistant coach for the Tampa Bay Lightning. In August 2010, Raeder retired, and now runs camps and clinics. Raeder is the analyst for Westwood One's coverage of the Frozen Four.

== Awards and honors ==
Award	Year
All-ECAC Hockey Second Team	1973–74
AHCA East All-American	1973–74

== Head coaching record ==
Record table
Season	Team	Overall	Conference	Standing	Postseason
Clarkson Golden Knights (ECAC Hockey) (1985–1988)
1985–86	Clarkson University	18–11–3	12–6–3	5th	ECAC Hockey Runner-Up
1986–87	Clarkson University	17–13–1	12–10–0	5th	ECAC Hockey Quarterfinals
1987–88	Clarkson University	17–15–3	10–9–3	6th	ECAC Hockey Runner-Up
Clarkson University:		52–39–7	34–25–6		
Total:		52–39–7			
National champion Postseason invitational champion Conference regular season champion Conference regular season and conference tournament champion Division regular season champion Division regular season and conference tournament champion Conference tournament champion

== Career statistics ==
=== Regular season and playoffs ===
			Regular season									Playoffs
Season	Team	League	GP	W	L	T	MIN	GA	SO	GAA	SV%	GP	W	L	MIN	GA	SO	GAA	SV%
1972–73	University of New Hampshire	ECAC	20	–	–	–	67	0	3.35	.897	–	–	–	–	–	–	–	–	–
1973–74	University of New Hampshire	ECAC	22	–	–	–	58	0	2.64	.908	–	–	–	–	–	–	–	–	–
1974–75	University of New Hampshire	ECAC	27	–	–	–	1559	94	0	3.62	.888	–	–	–	–	–	–	–	–
1975–76	Cape Codders	NAHL	21	9	8	3	1215	81	0	4.00		–	–	–	–	–	–	–	–
1975–76	Broome County Dusters	NAHL	21	7	12	1	1184	86	0	4.36	–	–	–	–	–	–	–	–	–
1975–76	New England Whalers	WHA	2	0	1	0	100	8	0	4.80	.826	14	7	7	819	31	2	2.27
1976–77	New England Whalers	WHA	26	12	10	1	1328	69	2	3.12	.902	1	0	1	60	7	0	7.00
1976–77	Rhode Island Reds	AHL	20	7	8	1	1060	75	0	4.25	.880	–	–	–	–	–	–	–	–
1977–78	Philadelphia Firebirds	AHL	9	2	5	1	472	38	0	4.83	.819	–	–	–	–	–	–	–	–
1978–79	New Hampshire/Cape Cod Freedoms	NEHL	47	Statistics Unavailable
1979–80	Richmond Rifles	EHL	36	–	–	–	2147	125	0	3.49		–	–	–	–	–	–	–	–
WHA totals			28	12	11	1	1428	77	2	3.24	.897	15	7	8	879	38	2	3.24

Sporting positions
Preceded by Darryl Sutter	Head coach of the San Jose Sharks; 2002 (interim)	Succeeded by Ron Wilson
