= List of San Jose Sharks head coaches =

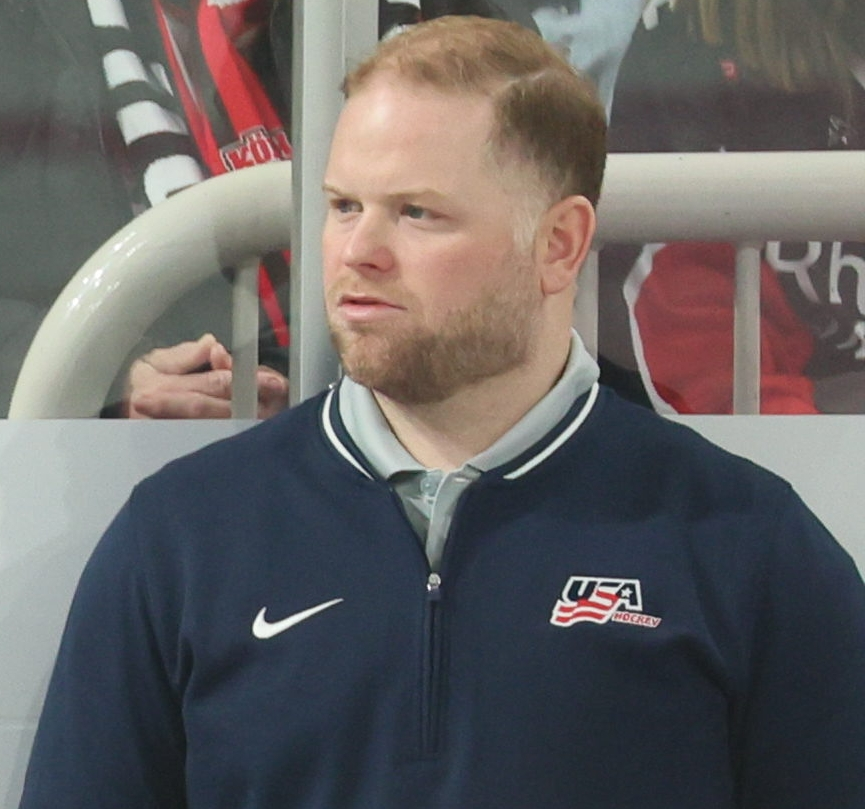
Ryan Warsofsky, the current head coach of the San Jose Sharks.

The San Jose Sharks are a professional ice hockey team based in San Jose, California. The team is a member of the Pacific Division in the Western Conference of the National Hockey League (NHL). Established for the 1991–92 NHL season, the Sharks initially played games at the Cow Palace before moving to SAP Center in 1993. The Sharks are owned by San Jose Sports & Entertainment Enterprises.

There have been twelve head coaches in Sharks franchise history. George Kingston was the first coach in Sharks history and lasted two seasons, which included a 1992–93 campaign where the team set an NHL record for losses in a season with 71. Todd McLellan has the most games coached (540), wins (311), points (688) and playoff games coached (62) in franchise history as of the end of the 2021-22 NHL season. Peter DeBoer is the leader in playoff wins, with 32 as of the end of the 2019 Stanley Cup playoffs, and the only coach to take the team to a Stanley Cup Final. Cap Raeder is the leader in winning percentage, winning his sole game as head coach on December 3, 2002 against the Phoenix Coyotes. Jim Wiley holds the franchise records for fewest wins (17) and fewest points (37), while Kingston holds the record for lowest winning percentage (.192). The current head coach of the Sharks is Ryan Warsofsky, whose hiring was announced on June 13, 2024.

== Key ==
#	Number of coaches^{[A]}
GC	Games coached
W	Wins
L	Loses
T	Ties
OTL	Overtime losses includes shootout losses
Win %	Winning percentage
†	Spent entire NHL coaching career with the Sharks

== Coaches ==
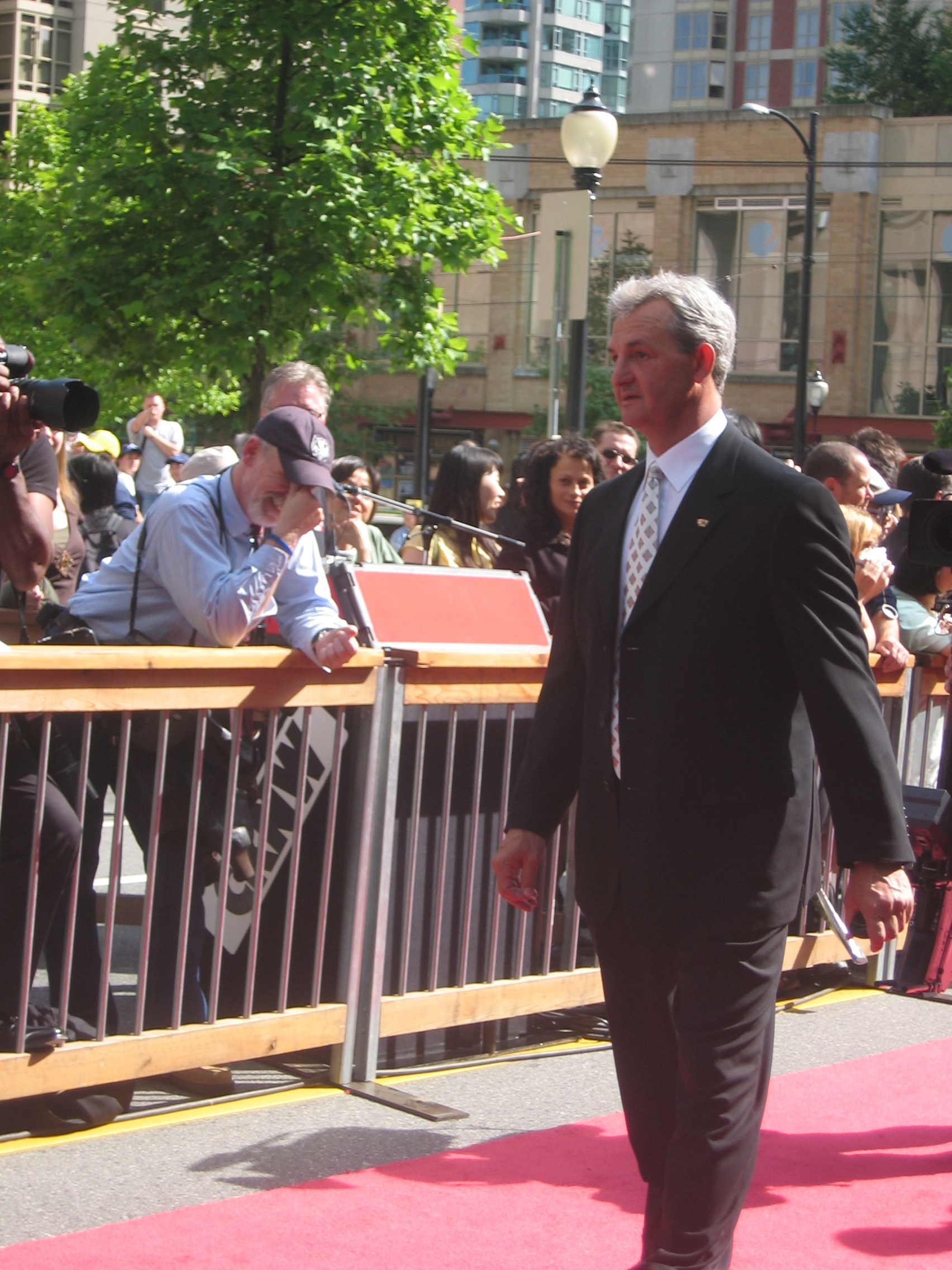
Darryl Sutter, the 5th head coach of the Sharks, coached the team from 1997 to 2002.

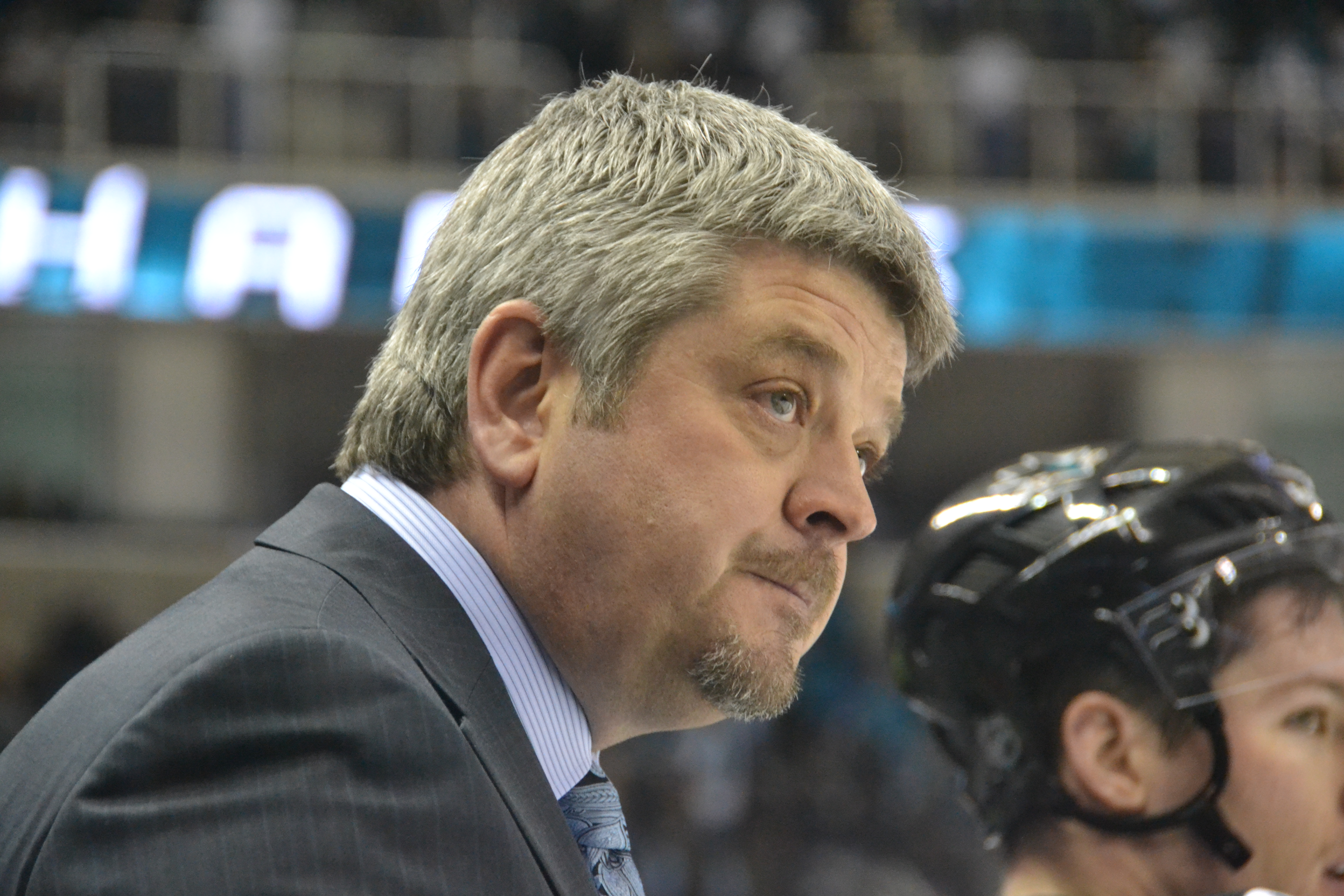
Todd McLellan, the 8th head coach of the Sharks, coached the team from 2008 to 2015.

#	Name	Nat	Dates	Regular season							Playoffs		
#	Name	Nat	Dates	GC	W	L	T	OTL^{[B]}	Pts	Points %	GC	W	L
1	George Kingston†	(Canada)	April 12, 1991 – April 18, 1993	164	28	129	7	—	63	.192	—		
2	Kevin Constantine	(United States)	June 16, 1993 – December 1, 1995	157	55	78	24	—	134	.427	25	11	14
3	Jim Wiley^{[C]}	(Canada)	December 1, 1995 – June 5, 1996	57	17	37	3	—	37	.325	—		
4	Al Sims†	(Canada)	June 5, 1996 – May 9, 1997	82	27	47	8	—	62	.378	—		
5	Darryl Sutter	(Canada)	June 8, 1997 – December 1, 2002	434	192	167	60	15	459	.529	42	18	24
6	Cap Raeder^{[D]}	(United States)	December 1, 2002 – December 4, 2002	1	1	0	0	0	2	1.000	—		
7	Ron Wilson	(United States)	December 4, 2002 – May 12, 2008	385	206	122	19	38	469	.609	52	28	24
8	Todd McLellan	(Canada)	June 11, 2008 – April 20, 2015	540	311	163	—	66	688	.637	62	30	32
9	Peter DeBoer	(Canada)	May 28, 2015 – December 11, 2019	361	198	129	—	34	430	.596	60	32	28
10	Bob Boughner^{[E]}	(Canada)	December 11, 2019 – July 1, 2022	175	67	85	—	23	157	.449	—		
11	David Quinn	(United States)	July 26, 2022 – April 24, 2024	164	41	98	—	25	107	.326	—		
12	Ryan Warsofsky	(United States)	June 13, 2024 – current	164	59	85	—	20	138	.421	—		

== See also ==
- List of NHL head coaches
- List of current NHL captains
- List of NHL players

== Notes ==
- ^{A} A running total of the number of coaches of the Sharks. Thus, any coach who had two separate terms as head coach is only counted once.
- ^{B} Before 1999, overtime losses were included in the loss column; Since 2005, ties are no longer possible.
- ^{C} Wiley served as interim coach for the remainder of the 1995–96 season following the firing of Constantine.
- ^{D} Raeder served as interim coach for a single game during the 2002–03 season following the firing of Sutter and prior to the hiring of Wilson.
- ^{E} Boughner served as interim coach for the remainder of the 2019–20 season following the firing of DeBoer before being named full-time coach.

== Sources ==
- "San Jose Sharks" (PDF). Archived from the original (PDF) on March 19, 2007.San Jose Sharks (15.7 MiB)
