= Kevin Constantine =

American ice hockey coach (born 1958)

- Born: December 27, 1958 (age 67) International Falls, Minnesota, U.S.
- Height: 5 ft 10 in (178 cm)
- Weight: 165 lb (75 kg; 11 st 11 lb)
- Position: Goalie
- Caught: Left
- Played for: RPI Engineers
- Coached for: North Iowa Huskies; Rochester Mustangs; Kalamazoo Wings (AC); Kansas City Blades; San Jose Sharks; Calgary Flames (AC); Pittsburgh Penguins; New Jersey Devils; Pittsburgh Forge; Everett Silvertips; Houston Aeros; Ducs d'Angers; HC Ambrì-Piotta; Everett Silvertips; Daemyung Killer Whales; Unia Oswiecim; Wenatchee Wild
- NHL draft: 154th overall, 1978; Montreal Canadiens
- Playing career: 1978–1980
- Coaching career: 1985–present

Kevin Lars Constantine (born December 27, 1958) is an American ice hockey coach who previously served as the head coach of the Wenatchee Wild of the Western Hockey League (WHL). The Wenatchee Wild’s first coach in franchise history was suspended on Sept. 24, 2023, after the league received a complaint regarding his conduct and began an investigation. Constantine has coached hockey teams in the NHL, WHL, IHL, AHL and numerous major junior hockey leagues. He was also the former head coach of HC Ambri-Piotta in the Swiss National League A. He also coached the North Iowa Huskies for a brief time. From 2022 to 2023, he was the head coach of the Hungarian national ice hockey team. He left that position despite having a valid contract in summer of 2023.

== Playing career ==
Born in International Falls, Minnesota, Constantine was drafted as goaltender by the Montreal Canadiens in the 1978 NHL Draft, and played 34 games of collegiate hockey for Rensselaer Polytechnic Institute in Troy, New York from 1977 to 1980. He left RPI as a junior and finished his degree at the University of Nevada, Reno.

== Coaching career ==
Constantine made a name for himself as a head coach in the late 1980s and early 1990s by guiding the Rochester Mustangs of the USHL and the Kansas City Blades of the IHL to winning records, as well as coaching the 1991 U.S. National Junior team to its (then) best-ever record at the World Junior Championships. Having found success at lower levels, he was hired as head coach of the San Jose Sharks for the 1993–1994 season: under his guidance, the team set an NHL record for largest improvement by finishing 58 points higher in the standings than it had the previous season. Between 1993 and 2002, Constantine would coach the Sharks, the Pittsburgh Penguins and the New Jersey Devils, earning a record of 161-150-61-5. He is the only coach in NHL history to take two eighth-seeded teams to first-round Stanley Cup playoff upsets (San Jose over the Detroit Red Wings in 1994 and Pittsburgh over New Jersey in 1999).

In 2001, he founded the Pittsburgh Forge, a new entry in the NAHL. In two seasons as the team's general manager and co-coach, Constantine amassed a record of 80–24–8 – the Forge won the NAHL regular season championship in 2002. After the 2002–2003 season, Constantine left Pittsburgh to be hired by the WHL expansion team, the Everett Silvertips, while the Forge relocated to eventually become the present-day Corpus Christi IceRays. In their first year, the Silvertips broke the record for best season ever by a first-year team in the major junior hockey leagues (the WHL, OHL and QMJHL), winning the U.S. Division Championship—they continued to set records, winning three straight playoff rounds to claim the Western Conference Championship and advance to the WHL Final against the Medicine Hat Tigers, where they lost 4–0.

In 2006, Constantine was fined $5,000 and suspended for four games by the WHL after an incident in which he made the Silvertips eat their post-game meal and ride the bus home in their equipment after losing an exhibition match to the Tri-City Americans 5-0.

On May 29, 2007, Constantine was named the head coach of the AHL's Houston Aeros. He quickly turned the performance of the Aeros around, leading them into the playoffs the next two seasons, including a trip to the Western Conference finals in 2009. On April 15, 2010, it was announced that Constantine's contract would not be renewed for the 2010–2011 season, after the Aeros again failed to make the playoffs for various reasons.

He accepted the head coaching job at Ducs d’Angers in France for the 2010-11 season. Two months into the job, Constantine left the club to take over HC Ambrì-Piotta of the Swiss top-flight National League A (NLA). He was removed from his head coaching position in October 2012, but stayed on as the club’s consultant.

On June 13, 2013, Constantine was introduced once again as the head coach of the Everett Silvertips, where he is reunited with the second Silvertips captain, Mitch Love, now an assistant coach.

On June 19, 2017 it was announced that Constantine has been hired as the head coach of the Incheon, South Korean hockey club Daemyung Killer Whales, one of eight teams in the Asia League Ice Hockey (ALIH) which comprises teams from South Korea, Japan and Russia. On November 20, 2020, he was announced the head coach of the Polish team Unia Oświęcim.

On July 13, 2023, the Wenatchee Wild announced Constantine as the team's first WHL head coach following the sale, relocation, and renaming of the Western Hockey League's Winnipeg Ice to Wenatchee following the 2022-2023 season. In September 2023, the WHL suspended Constantine indefinitely pending an independent investigation into his conduct with the team. On October 4, 2023, the WHL announced that he had been suspended indefinitely after an independent investigation determined he violated Western Hockey League regulations and policies by making derogatory comments of a discriminatory nature. The earliest he could apply to be reinstated is 2025.

== NHL coaching record ==
Team	Year	Regular season							Playoffs			
Team	Year	G	W	L	T	OTL	Pts	Finish	W	L	Win %	Result
San Jose Sharks	1993–94	84	33	35	16	–	82	3rd in Pacific	7	7	.500	Lost in Second round
San Jose Sharks	1994–95	48	19	25	4	–	42	3rd in Pacific	4	7	.364	Lost in Second round
San Jose Sharks	1995–96	25	3	18	4	–	10	7th in Pacific	–	–	–	Fired
Pittsburgh Penguins	1997–98	82	40	24	18	–	98	1st in Northeast	2	4	.333	Lost in First round
Pittsburgh Penguins	1998–99	82	38	30	14	–	90	3rd in Northeast	6	7	.462	Lost in Second round
Pittsburgh Penguins	1999–2000	25	8	10	3	4	20	3rd in Northeast	–	–	–	Fired
New Jersey Devils	2001–02	31	20	8	2	1	43	3rd in Atlantic	2	4	.333	Lost in First round
NHL Totals		377	161	150	61	5	385	-	21	29	.398	5 playoff appearances, 0 Stanley Cup wins

== Awards ==
Constantine has been the recipient of USA Hockey's Distinguished Achievement Award: USA Hockey is the governing body for amateur ice hockey in the United States, and the award recognizes a U.S. citizen who has made a major contribution to hockey in the United States.

He was a finalist for the 1994 Jack Adams Award for top NHL coach.

He won the 1991–1992 Commissioner's Trophy.

Constantine also was awarded the Coach of the Year award by the WHL in 2004.

Sporting positions
Preceded by George Kingston	Head coach of the San Jose Sharks; 1993–95	Succeeded by Jim Wiley
Preceded by Eddie Johnston	Head coach of the Pittsburgh Penguins; 1997–2000	Succeeded by Herb Brooks
Preceded by Larry Robinson	Head coach of the New Jersey Devils; 2001–02	Succeeded by Pat Burns
Preceded by Rob Daum	Head coach of the Houston Aeros; 2007–10	Succeeded by Mike Yeo
