= Peter DeBoer =

Canadian ice hockey player and coach

- Born: June 13, 1968 (age 58) Dunnville, Ontario, Canada
- Height: 6 ft 1 in (185 cm)
- Weight: 195 lb (88 kg; 13 st 13 lb)
- Position: Centre
- Shot: Right
- Played for: Milwaukee Admirals
- Current NHL coach: New York Islanders
- Coached for: Florida Panthers; New Jersey Devils; San Jose Sharks; Vegas Golden Knights; Dallas Stars
- NHL draft: 237th overall, 1988; Toronto Maple Leafs
- Playing career: 1988–1991
- Coaching career: 1995–present

George Peter DeBoer (born June 13, 1968) is a Canadian professional ice hockey coach and former player who is the head coach for the New York Islanders of the National Hockey League (NHL). He was selected in the 12th round, 237th overall, by the Toronto Maple Leafs in the 1988 NHL entry draft but never played in the NHL, instead playing for the Milwaukee Admirals of the International Hockey League (IHL).

A two-time winner of the Ontario Hockey League (OHL) Coach of the Year award, DeBoer was a junior hockey head coach for 13 seasons with the Detroit Whalers (1995–1997), Plymouth Whalers (1997–2001) and Kitchener Rangers (2001–08), the latter of which he led to a Memorial Cup victory in 2003. DeBoer is also a co-owner of the Oshawa Generals. He served as the head coach of the Florida Panthers from 2008 to 2011, the New Jersey Devils from 2011 to 2014, the San Jose Sharks from 2015 to 2019, the Vegas Golden Knights from 2020 to 2022, and the Dallas Stars from 2022 to 2025. DeBoer has the most playoff wins without a Stanley Cup championship with 97.

== Playing career ==
DeBoer was drafted 237th overall by the Toronto Maple Leafs in the 1988 NHL entry draft. At the time, he was playing with the Windsor Spitfires in the OHL, and in his best offensive season, he scored 45 goals and 46 assists for 91 points. After Windsor, DeBoer went on to play for the Milwaukee Admirals of the International Hockey League (IHL), playing two full seasons with them. In his last season with the Admirals, he scored 27 goals and 34 assists for 61 points and retired after that season.

			Regular season					Playoffs
Season	Team	League	GP	G	A	Pts	PIM	GP	G	A	Pts	PIM
1985–86	Windsor Compuware Spitfires	OHL	55	3	6	9	20	11	1	0	1	0
1986–87	Windsor Compuware Spitfires	OHL	52	13	17	30	37	14	4	9	13	16
1987–88	Windsor Compuware Spitfires	OHL	54	23	18	41	41	12	4	4	8	14
1988–89	Windsor Compuware Spitfires	OHL	65	45	46	91	40	4	2	3	5	0
1988–89	Milwaukee Admirals	IHL	2	0	1	1	0	1	0	2	2	2
1989–90	Milwaukee Admirals	IHL	67	21	19	40	16	6	0	3	3	4
1990–91	Milwaukee Admirals	IHL	82	27	34	61	34	6	1	3	4	0
OHL totals			226	84	87	171	138	41	11	16	27	30
IHL totals			151	48	54	102	50	13	1	8	9	6

== Coaching career ==
=== Detroit Whalers ===
DeBoer became an assistant coach for the Detroit Junior Red Wings during the 1994–95 season. During the 1995 off-season, the club was renamed the Detroit Whalers and DeBoer was promoted to the dual position of head coach-general manager after Paul Maurice left the team to become the coach of the NHL's Hartford Whalers. DeBoer guided the Whalers to a first-place finish in the West Division, as Detroit advanced to the third round in the playoffs. In 1996–97, Detroit struggled to a 26–34–6 record and was eliminated in the first round of the post-season.

=== Plymouth Whalers ===
The Whalers renamed themselves the Plymouth Whalers during the 1997 off-season, and the team rebounded to a second-place finish in the West Division with a 37–22–7 record – for the second time in three seasons, they advanced to the third round of the playoffs. In 1998–99, DeBoer led the team to an OHL-leading 106 points, earning them the Hamilton Spectator Trophy, and DeBoer winning the Matt Leyden Trophy as OHL Coach of the Year. Plymouth had a disappointing playoff run, however, as they were defeated by the underdog London Knights in the second round of the playoffs.

In 1999–2000, Plymouth once again had the best record in the league, earning DeBoer his second straight Matt Leyden Trophy. The Whalers advanced all the way to the J. Ross Robertson Cup finals before losing to the Barrie Colts 4–2 in the seventh and series deciding game.

The Whalers had another very successful season in 2000–01, winning the West Division for the third consecutive season and having the second best record in the League. Plymouth got hot in the playoffs, winning their first nine games, and advanced to the J. Ross Robertson Cup for the second season in a row. In the final round, Plymouth lost to the Ottawa 67's in six games.

After the season, both DeBoer and his assistant, Steve Spott, decided to leave the Whalers and join the Kitchener Rangers in similar positions.

=== Kitchener Rangers ===
DeBoer took over a Kitchener team that had missed the OHL playoffs in the previous season and finished ten games under .500, and quickly the club showed improvement, as the Rangers finished in third place in the Midwest Division with a 35–22–10–1 record. The team was then swept in the first round of the playoffs by their Highway 7 rivals, the Guelph Storm.

The Rangers continued to improve in the 2002–03 season, winning the Hamilton Spectator Trophy as Kitchener had a League-best 100 points. In the playoffs, the Rangers quickly swept the Sault Ste. Marie Greyhounds in the first round, followed by a five-game series win over the Guelph Storm, setting up a Western Conference matchup against DeBoer's former team, the Plymouth Whalers. After the Whalers won the fifth game by a 2–1 score in overtime to take a 3–2 series lead, the Rangers rebounded and staved off elimination by winning the final two games of the series, advancing to the J. Ross Robertson Cup finals against the Ottawa 67's. Ottawa took the series opener, however, Kitchener rebounded and won four in a row to win the Cup and earn a berth in the 2003 Memorial Cup. DeBoer led the Rangers to a perfect 3–0 record during the round-robin portion of the tournament, sending Kitchener to the finals against the Hull Olympiques. The Rangers would easily defeat Hull 6–3 in the game to win their first Memorial Cup since 1982.

Kitchener saw themselves in a rebuilding season in 2003–04, however, as DeBoer helped the club finish fourth in the Western Conference with a 34–26–6–2 record. The team struggled in the playoffs, eventually losing to the Plymouth Whalers in five games in the opening round. The 2004–05 season saw the team once again finish in third in their division and fourth in the conference. DeBoer led the Rangers to a first round victory over the Erie Otters, then helped Kitchener to a stunning series sweep over the powerful Owen Sound Attack. In the third round, the Rangers faced the record-setting London Knights, and were quickly eliminated in five games.

In 2005–06, Kitchener saw their point total improve to 96, the third highest in the League. The team, however, was upset by the Owen Sound Attack in the first round of the playoffs. They then increased their point total to 98 in the following season, 2006–07, finishing third in the Western Conference and easily sweeping the Sarnia Sting in the first round. Kitchener would struggle in the second round, however, losing in five games to the Plymouth Whalers.

With the Rangers being named the host of the 2008 Memorial Cup, Kitchener put together one of the best regular season's in OHL history, finishing with a 53–11–4 record, earning a League-high 110 points to win the Hamilton Spectator Trophy. The DeBoer-led Rangers quickly swept the Plymouth Whalers and Sarnia Sting in the first two rounds before disposing the Sault Ste. Marie Greyhounds in the Western Conference finals. In the J. Ross Robertson Cup finals, the Rangers took the first three games of the series, though the opposing Belleville Bulls rebounded and took the next three games, setting up a deciding Game 7 matchup at the Kitchener Memorial Auditorium. In the last game of the series, the Rangers defeated the Bulls 4–1 to win the championship. During the 2008 Memorial Cup, the Rangers had a 1–2 record in the round-robin, setting up a rematch against the Bulls in the semifinals. Kitchener exploded for a 9–0 win and would face the Western Hockey League (WHL)'s Spokane Chiefs in the final game. The Chiefs ultimately spoiled the Rangers' party, defeating Kitchener 4–1.

=== Florida Panthers ===
On June 13, 2008, the Florida Panthers in the National Hockey League (NHL) hired DeBoer as the team's head coach. DeBoer led the Panthers to a 41–30–11 record, tied with the Montreal Canadiens for eighth place in the Eastern Conference. The Panthers would miss the playoffs by one point, as the Canadiens advanced due to winning the head-to-head series with the Panthers 3–1.

The Panthers struggled in the 2009–10 season and finished with a 32–37–13 record, last place in the Southeast Division.

The team had an even worse 2010–11, as the team finished in last place in the Eastern Conference with a 30–40–12 record. After that season, the Panthers fired DeBoer with one year remaining on his contract.

=== New Jersey Devils ===
On July 19, 2011, the New Jersey Devils hired DeBoer as the team's head coach following two interviews with former Devils general manager Lou Lamoriello. In his first season, DeBoer posted career highs in wins and point totals, guiding his team to the Stanley Cup playoffs for the first time in his coaching career. The Devils beat their first round opponent, DeBoer's former Florida Panthers, in double overtime in Game 7. The Devils would also go on to dispatch the Philadelphia Flyers in five games in round two and the New York Rangers in six games in the Eastern Conference finals. It was the first time the New Jersey Devils had reached the Stanley Cup Final since 2003. The Devils, however, lost the Final to the Los Angeles Kings in six games.

The Devils slipped into last place in the Atlantic Division in the 2012–13 season, going 19–19–10 (48 points) in the lockout-shortened, 48-game season and failing to qualify for the 2013 playoffs.

In 2013–14, the Devils began the year with a 1–5–3 record and were not able to rebound from their poor start, finishing sixth in the newly created Metropolitan Division with a 35–29–18 record, failing to qualify for the post-season for their second straight season.

On December 26, 2014, after leading New Jersey to a subpar 12–17–7 record, the Devils fired DeBoer, replacing him with both Scott Stevens and Adam Oates in a dual-coaching setup.

=== San Jose Sharks ===
On May 28, 2015, the San Jose Sharks hired DeBoer as the team's head coach, replacing former head coach Todd McLellan. In his first season, he led the Sharks to the playoffs after finishing third in their division. They defeated the Los Angeles Kings in 5 games, Nashville Predators in 7 in the second round, and won the Western Conference finals against the St. Louis Blues in 6 games, making it the second time DeBoer has made the Stanley Cup Final in his first year coaching a new team. On December 11, 2019, DeBoer was fired by the Sharks after a 15–16–2 start to the season.

=== Vegas Golden Knights ===
On January 15, 2020, DeBoer was hired as the head coach of the Vegas Golden Knights, replacing Gerard Gallant. The Golden Knights advanced to the Western Conference finals but fell to the Dallas Stars in five games.

In the COVID-shortened 2020–21 season, DeBoer led the Knights to a 40–14–2 record, tied for the most points in the league with the Colorado Avalanche. They placed second in the West Division as they had five fewer regulation wins than the Avalanche. They lost in the Stanley Cup semifinals to the Montreal Canadiens in six games.

The Golden Knights finished the 2021–22 season with a 43–31–8 record under DeBoer's leadership and failed to make the playoffs for the first time in franchise history. On May 16, 2022, DeBoer was relieved of his duties as head coach, finishing with an overall 98–50–12 record in Vegas.

=== Dallas Stars ===
On June 21, 2022, just over one month after his dismissal from Vegas, DeBoer was hired as the head coach of the Dallas Stars, replacing Rick Bowness.

On June 6, 2025, DeBoer was fired by the Stars after their third consecutive loss in the conference finals. Stars' general manager Jim Nill revealed that DeBoer's comments about goaltender Jake Oettinger following a game 5 loss to the Edmonton Oilers on May 29 was one of the reasons that led to his firing.

=== New York Islanders ===
On April 5, 2026, DeBoer was named head coach of the New York Islanders after the firing of Patrick Roy.

== Head coaching record ==
Team	Year	Regular season						Postseason			
Team	Year	G	W	L	OTL	Pts	Finish	W	L	Win%	Result
FLA	2008–09	82	41	30	11	93	3rd in Southeast	—	—	—	Missed playoffs
FLA	2009–10	82	32	37	13	77	5th in Southeast	—	—	—	Missed playoffs
FLA	2010–11	82	30	40	12	72	5th in Southeast	—	—	—	Missed playoffs
FLA total		246	103	107	36			—	—	—	
NJD	2011–12	82	48	28	6	102	4th in Atlantic	14	10	.583	Lost in Stanley Cup Final (LAK)
NJD	2012–13	48	19	19	10	48	5th in Atlantic	—	—	—	Missed playoffs
NJD	2013–14	82	35	29	18	88	6th in Metropolitan	—	—	—	Missed playoffs
NJD	2014–15	36	12	17	7	(31)	(fired)	—	—	—	—
NJD total		248	114	93	25			14	10	.583	1 playoff appearance
SJS	2015–16	82	46	30	6	98	3rd in Pacific	14	10	.583	Lost in Stanley Cup Final (PIT)
SJS	2016–17	82	46	29	7	99	3rd in Pacific	2	4	.333	Lost in first round (EDM)
SJS	2017–18	82	45	27	10	100	3rd in Pacific	6	4	.600	Lost in second round (VGK)
SJS	2018–19	82	46	27	9	101	2nd in Pacific	10	10	.500	Lost in conference finals (STL)
SJS	2019–20	33	15	16	2	(32)	(fired)	—	—	—	—
SJS total		361	198	129	34			32	28	.533	4 playoff appearances
VGK	2019–20	22	15	5	2	(32)	1st in Pacific	12	8	.600	Lost in conference finals (DAL)
VGK	2020–21	56	40	14	2	82	2nd in West	10	9	.526	Lost in conference finals (MTL)
VGK	2021–22	82	43	31	8	94	4th in Pacific	—	—	—	Missed playoffs
VGK total		160	98	50	12			22	17	.564	2 playoff appearances
DAL	2022–23	82	47	21	14	108	2nd in Central	10	9	.526	Lost in conference finals (VGK)
DAL	2023–24	82	52	21	9	113	1st in Central	10	9	.526	Lost in conference finals (EDM)
DAL	2024–25	82	50	26	6	106	2nd in Central	9	9	.500	Lost in conference finals (EDM)
DAL total		246	149	68	29			29	27	.518	3 playoff appearances
NYI	2025–26	4	1	3	0	(2)	6th in Metropolitan	—	—	—	Missed playoffs
Total		1,265	663	450	152			97	82	.542	10 playoff appearances

== Personal life ==
After the passing of Muhammad Ali, DeBoer shared he once met and received a signed Qur’an from Ali.

DeBoer holds a Juris Doctor degrees from both the University of Windsor and the University of Detroit Mercy as a graduate of the Dual JD Program, but he gave up a position with a criminal law firm to continue coaching.

He and his wife Susan have three children. Their older son, Jack, played for Niagara University and their youngest son, Matt, plays for the Dundee Stars.

== Awards ==
- Awarded Matt Leyden Trophy as OHL Coach of the Year (1999, 2000)

Sporting positions
Preceded by Paul Maurice	Head coach of the Detroit/Plymouth Whalers; 1995–2001	Succeeded by Mike Vellucci
Preceded by Jeff Snyder	Head coach of the Kitchener Rangers; 2001–2008	Succeeded by Steve Spott
Preceded by Jacques Martin	Head coach of the Florida Panthers; 2008–2011	Succeeded by Kevin Dineen
Preceded by Jacques Lemaire	Head coach of the New Jersey Devils; 2011–2014	Succeeded by Adam Oates; Scott Stevens
Preceded by Todd McLellan	Head coach of the San Jose Sharks; 2015–2019	Succeeded by Bob Boughner (interim)
Preceded by Gerard Gallant	Head coach of the Vegas Golden Knights; 2020–2022	Succeeded by Bruce Cassidy
Preceded by Rick Bowness	Head coach of the Dallas Stars; 2022–2025	Succeeded by Glen Gulutzan
Preceded by Patrick Roy	Head coach of the New York Islanders; 2026–present	Incumbent
