= 1986–87 BHL season =

- Sport: ice hockey

Seasons
- ← 1985–86 1987–88 →

The 1986–87 BHL season was the fifth season of the British Hockey League, the top level of ice hockey in Great Britain. 10 teams participated in the league, and the Murrayfield Racers won the league title by finishing first in the regular season. The Durham Wasps were playoff champions.

== Regular season ==
Team	GP	W	T	L	GF	GA	Pts
Murrayfield Racers	36	29	2	5	414	218	60
Dundee Rockets	36	26	1	9	324	203	53
Fife Flyers	36	23	1	12	317	215	47
Nottingham Panthers	36	23	1	12	286	227	47
Durham Wasps	36	22	2	11	335	214	46
Ayr Bruins	36	17	2	17	186	261	36
Whitley Warriors	36	14	2	20	298	321	30
Streatham Redskins	36	10	2	24	212	332	22
Solihull Barons	36	4	1	30	178	368	9
Cleveland Bombers	36	3	2	31	178	369	8

== Playoffs ==
=== Group A ===
Group A	GP	W	T	L	Pts
Murrayfield Racers	4	3	0	1	6
Durham Wasps	4	3	0	1	6
Nottingham Panthers	4	0	0	4	0

=== Group B ===
Group B	GP	W	T	L	Pts
Fife Flyers	4	3	0	1	6
Dundee Rockets	4	2	0	2	4
Ayr Bruins	4	1	0	3	2

=== Semifinals ===
- Durham Wasps 7-5 Fife Flyers
- Murrayfield Racers 9-6 Dundee Rockets

=== Final ===
- Durham Wasps 9-5 Murrayfield Racers

Preceded by 1985–86 BHL season	BHL seasons	Succeeded by 1987–88 BHL season
