= 1987–88 BHL season =

- Sport: ice hockey

Seasons
- ← 1986–87 1988–89 →

The 1987–88 BHL season was the sixth season of the British Hockey League, the top level of ice hockey in Great Britain. 10 teams participated in the league, and the Murrayfield Racers won the league title by finishing first in the regular season. The Durham Wasps were playoff champions.

== Regular season ==
Team	GP	W	T	L	GF	GA	Pts
Murrayfield Racers	36	29	0	7	381	216	58
Whitley Warriors	36	27	2	7	371	256	56
Fife Flyers	36	26	2	8	323	215	54
Durham Wasps	36	26	1	9	393	214	53
Solihull Barons	36	19	3	14	329	303	41
Nottingham Panthers	36	13	2	21	243	298	28
Ayr Bruins	36	10	2	24	233	324	22
Dundee Tigers	36	8	2	26	254	389	18
Streatham Redskins	35	8	1	26	201	320	17
Peterborough Pirates	35	4	3	28	172	345	11

== Playoffs ==
=== Group A ===
Group A	GP	W	T	L	Pts
Fife Flyers	4	4	0	0	8
Murrayfield Racers	4	2	0	2	4
Solihull Barons	4	0	0	4	0

=== Group B ===
Group B	GP	W	T	L	Pts
Durham Wasps	4	3	0	1	6
Whitley Warriors	4	3	0	1	6
Nottingham Panthers	4	0	0	4	0

=== Semifinals ===
- Durham Wasps 11-8 Murrayfield Racers
- Fife Flyers 13-5 Whitley Warriors

=== Final ===
- Fife Flyers 5-8 Durham Wasps

Preceded by 1986–87 BHL season	BHL seasons	Succeeded by 1988–89 BHL season
