= 1988–89 BHL season =

- Sport: ice hockey

Seasons
- ← 1987–88 1989–90 →

The 1988–89 BHL season was the seventh season of the British Hockey League, the top level of ice hockey in Great Britain. 10 teams participated in the league, and the Durham Wasps won the league title by finishing first in the regular season. The Nottingham Panthers were playoff champions.

== Regular season ==
Team	GP	W	T	L	GF	GA	Pts
Durham Wasps	36	26	4	6	371	246	56
Murrayfield Racers	36	25	2	9	404	266	52
Fife Flyers	36	24	1	11	311	231	49
Nottingham Panthers	36	22	5	9	305	193	49
Whitley Warriors	36	22	2	12	347	266	46
Ayr Bruins	36	17	4	15	285	273	38
Peterborough Pirates	36	9	4	23	268	331	22
Solihull Barons	36	9	3	21	228	386	21
Tayside Tigers	36	7	3	26	226	331	17
Streatham Redskins	36	4	2	30	221	453	10

== Playoffs ==
=== Group A ===
Group A	GP	W	T	L	Pts
Whitley Warriors	4	2	1	1	5
Durham Wasps	4	1	2	1	4
Fife Flyers	4	1	1	2	3

=== Group B ===
Group B	GP	W	T	L	Pts
Ayr Bruins	4	3	0	1	6
Nottingham Panthers	4	2	0	2	4
Murrayfield Racers	4	1	0	3	2

=== Semifinals ===
- Whitley Warriors 6-8 Nottingham Panthers
- Ayr Bruins 12-6 Durham Wasps

=== Final ===
- Ayr Bruins 3-6 Nottingham Panthers

Preceded by 1987–88 BHL season	BHL seasons	Succeeded by 1989–90 BHL season
