= 1990–91 BHL season =

- Sport: ice hockey

Seasons
- ← 1989–90 1991–92 →

The 1990–91 BHL season was the ninth season of the British Hockey League, the top level of ice hockey in Great Britain. 10 teams participated in the league, and the Durham Wasps won the league title by finishing first in the regular season. They also won the playoff championship

== Regular season ==
Team	GP	W	T	L	GF	GA	Pts
Durham Wasps	36	28	3	5	324	186	59
Cardiff Devils	36	21	2	13	274	237	44
Peterborough Pirates	36	19	4	13	287	241	42
Murrayfield Racers	36	19	2	15	264	236	40
Ayr Raiders	36	18	3	15	243	243	39
Nottingham Panthers	36	16	4	16	200	202	36
Whitley Warriors	36	13	4	19	269	292	30
Solihull Barons	36	13	1	22	255	340	27
Cleveland Bombers	36	9	5	22	198	246	23
Fife Flyers	36	8	4	24	215	306	20

== Playoffs ==
=== Group A ===
Group A	GP	W	T	L	GF	GA	Pts
Durham Wasps	6	4	0	2	69	30	8
Peterborough Pirates	6	3	2	1	43	40	8
Ayr Raiders	6	3	0	3	38	53	6
Solihull Barons	6	0	2	4	37	64	2

=== Group B ===
Group B	GP	W	T	L	GF	GA	Pts
Cardiff Devils	6	4	0	2	43	30	8
Murrayfield Racers	6	4	0	2	35	27	8
Whitley Warriors	6	3	1	2	31	35	7
Nottingham Panthers	6	0	1	5	22	39	1

=== Semifinals ===
- Cardiff Devils 4-7 Peterborough Pirates
- Durham Wasps 11-6 Murrayfield Racers

=== Final ===
- Durham Wasps 7-4 Peterborough Pirates

Preceded by 1989–90 BHL season	BHL seasons	Succeeded by 1991–92 BHL season
