= 1992–93 BHL season =

- Sport: ice hockey

Seasons
- ← 1991–92 1993–94 →

The 1992–93 BHL season was the 11th season of the British Hockey League, the top level of ice hockey in Great Britain. 10 teams participated in the league, and the Cardiff Devils won the league title by finishing first in the regular season. They also won the playoff championship.

== Regular season ==
Team	GP	W	T	L	GF	GA	Pts
Cardiff Devils	36	28	2	6	319	187	58
Murrayfield Racers	36	20	2	14	299	267	42
Nottingham Panthers	36	19	2	15	256	236	40
Whitley Warriors	36	18	1	17	262	286	37
Bracknell Bees	36	15	4	17	190	174	34
Billingham Bombers	36	14	4	18	275	303	32
Fife Flyers	36	15	1	20	193	232	31
Humberside Seahawks	36	15	1	20	198	222	31
Peterborough Pirates	36	14	1	21	238	272	29
Durham Wasps	36	12	2	22	201	232	26

== Playoffs ==
=== Group A ===
Group A	GP	W	T	L	GF	GA	Pts
Cardiff Devils	6	6	0	0	52	24	12
Humberside Seahawks	6	3	1	2	34	36	7
Whitley Warriors	6	2	1	3	44	44	5
Bracknell Bees	6	0	0	6	23	39	0

=== Group B ===
Group B	GP	W	T	L	GF	GA	Pts
Nottingham Panthers	6	5	0	1	52	24	10
Murrayfield Racers	6	5	0	1	54	33	10
Billingham Bombers	6	2	0	4	30	44	4
Fife Flyers	6	0	0	6	21	56	0

=== Semifinals ===
- Cardiff Devils 9-0 Murrayfield Racers
- Humberside Seahawks 5-4 (OT) Nottingham Panthers

=== Final ===
- Cardiff Devils 7-4 Humberside Seahawks

Preceded by 1991–92 BHL season	BHL seasons	Succeeded by 1993–94 BHL season
