= 1991–92 BHL season =

- Sport: ice hockey

Seasons
- ← 1990–91 1992–93 →

The 1991–92 BHL season was the tenth season of the British Hockey League, the top level of ice hockey in Great Britain. 10 teams participated in the league, and the Durham Wasps won the league title by finishing first in the regular season. They also won the playoff championship.

== Regular season ==
Team	GP	W	T	L	GF	GA	Pts
Durham Wasps	36	24	6	4	314	162	58
Nottingham Panthers	36	21	3	12	238	192	45
Cardiff Devils	36	20	3	13	235	204	43
Humberside Seahawks	36	18	5	13	224	203	41
Murrayfield Racers	36	18	2	16	234	218	38
Whitley Warriors	36	16	3	17	250	246	35
Peterborough Pirates	36	13	8	15	201	225	34
Billingham Bombers	36	11	5	20	184	258	27
Bracknell Bees	36	9	2	25	167	264	20
Ayr Raiders	36	8	3	25	176	251	19

== Playoffs ==
=== Group A ===
Group A	Club
1.	Nottingham Panthers
2.	Whitley Warriors
3.	Cardiff Devils
4.	Billingham Bombers

=== Group B ===
Group B	Club
1.	Durham Wasps
2.	Peterborough Pirates
3.	Humberside Seahawks
4.	Murrayfield Racers

=== Semifinals ===
- Nottingham Panthers 7-3 Peterborough Pirates
- Durham Wasps 11-4 Whitley Warriors

=== Final ===
- Durham Wasps 7-6 Nottingham Panthers

Preceded by 1990–91 BHL season	BHL seasons	Succeeded by 1992–93 BHL season
