= 1989–90 BHL season =

- Sport: ice hockey

Seasons
- ← 1988–89 1990–91 →

The 1989–90 BHL season was the eighth season of the British Hockey League, the top level of ice hockey in Great Britain. Nine teams participated in the league, and the Cardiff Devils won the league title by finishing first in the regular season. They also won the playoff championship.

== Regular season ==
Team	GP	W	T	L	GF	GA	Pts
Cardiff Devils	32	28	1	3	304	146	57
Murrayfield Racers	32	23	3	6	273	169	49
Durham Wasps	32	20	2	10	261	209	42
Solihull Barons	32	16	1	15	218	209	33
Fife Flyers	32	14	3	15	226	264	31
Nottingham Panthers	32	12	2	18	183	185	26
Ayr Raiders	32	9	4	19	181	229	22
Peterborough Pirates	32	7	0	25	174	281	14
Whitley Warriors	32	6	2	24	202	330	14

== Playoffs ==
=== Group A ===
Group A	GP	W	T	L	GF	GA	Pts
Cardiff Devils	4	3	1	0	28	15	7
Nottingham Panthers	4	1	1	2	14	18	3
Solihull Barons	4	1	0	3	17	26	2

=== Group B ===
Group B	GP	W	T	L	GF	GA	Pts
Murrayfield Racers	4	2	1	1	25	19	5
Fife Flyers	4	2	0	2	22	22	4
Durham Wasps	4	1	1	2	25	31	3

=== Semifinals ===
- Cardiff Devils 5-1 Fife Flyers
- Nottingham Panthers 4-5 Murrayfield Racers

=== Final ===
- Cardiff Devils 6-5 (SO) Murrayfield Racers

Preceded by 1988–89 BHL season	BHL seasons	Succeeded by 1990–91 BHL season
