= 2009–10 Victoria Salmon Kings season =

2009-10 Victoria Salmon Kings
- League: 16th ECHL
- Division: 4th West
- Conference: 7th National
- 2009-10 record: 34-32-4-2
- Home record: 23-12-0-1
- Road record: 11-20-4-1
- Goals for: 230
- Goals against: 243

Team information
- General manager: Mark Morrison
- Coach: Mark Morrison
- Assistant coach: Ryan Wade
- Captain: Wes Goldie
- Alternate captains: Tim Wedderburn; Patrick Coulombe
- Arena: Save-On-Foods Memorial Centre
- Average attendance: 4,369

Team leaders
- Goals: Wes Goldie (44)
- Assists: Chad Painchaud (38)
- Points: Chad Painchaud (68)
- Penalty minutes: Mike Hamilton (106)
- Plus/minus: Patrick Coulombe (+14)
- Wins: David Shantz (18)
- Goals against average: David Shantz (2.88)

The 2009–10 Victoria Salmon Kings season is the Salmon Kings' 6th season in the ECHL. General Manager and Head Coach Mark Morrison returned for his third full season as bench boss, while former Salmon King, Ryan Wade returned for his second year as Assistant Coach. The Salmon Kings would struggle in their first 10 games going 1-9-0-0, which placed them in last place of the National Conference standings and caused changes to their roster.

However, on November 11, the Salmon Kings went on a 22-6-3-0 run in their next 31 games heading towards the ECHL All-Star break, which made Victoria the hottest team in the ECHL by accumulating the most wins and points through the 67-day stretch. The streak also included a 12-game overall winning streak and tying their previous club record with a 12-game home winning streak. The goaltending in the middle of season would see Glenn Fisher, along with three Abbotsford Heat netminders – David Shantz, Matt Keetley, and Leland Irving rotating starts, while Chad Painchaud, Olivier Latendresse and Wes Goldie led the offensive-attack during the stretch run. At the 2010 ECHL All-Star Game, goaltender, David Shantz was named as the starting goaltender for the National Conference, while defenceman and Victoria native, Taylor Ellington joined the roster.

After the All-Star break, the Salmon Kings hot-streak would progressively come to an end when the team encountered several impactful injuries and call-ups in the second half of the season. The Salmon Kings would complete the season finishing with a 10-17-0-2 record and barely made the playoffs, finishing with a 34-32-4-2 and placing 7th in the National Conference standings.

In the Kelly Cup playoffs, the Salmon Kings would play against the Bakersfield Condors in the first round of the best-of-five series. Victoria would win Games 1 and 3 to take a 2-1 series lead, but was unable to finish the Condors off, losing in the fifth-and-deciding game with the game-winning goal coming in the final minute of regulation at Rabobank Arena.

The 2009-10 season produced many highlight moments and individual accomplishments. On January 15, the Salmon Kings played in their 400th game in club history. After that night, the trio of Adam Taylor, Scott Howes, and Dirk Southern combined for a highlight-reel goal vs. Bakersfield at Save-On-Foods Memorial Centre, which became known as "The Goal" and made TSN's Highlight of the Night . In addition, the Salmon Kings also set franchise records such for most goals in a game (9) and fastest two goals (eight seconds apart).

Furthermore, the Salmon Kings players also accomplished notable individual achievements, as well. On February 11, team captain Wes Goldie passed Ryan Wade's club record for most games played in a Salmon Kings uniform at 266 games. During this season, Chad Painchaud and Jimmy Sharrow broke a five-year-old club record by scoring points in 14 and 12 straight games respectively. Painchaud would tie the franchise record goal scoring streak by scoring goals in five straight games, while veteran Olivier Filion would break the all-time club record with most games registering an assist doing so in seven games. Lastly, Jimmy Sharrow was named as in the ECHL All-Second Team honors at the end of the season.

== Standings ==
=== Division standings ===
West Division	GP	W	L	OTL	SOL	PTS	GF	GA
Idaho Steelheads (DAL)	72	48	17	2	5	103	260	191
Alaska Aces (STL)	72	36	28	4	4	80	232	240
Utah Grizzlies (NYI)	72	34	29	4	5	77	260	253
Victoria Salmon Kings (VAN)	72	34	32	4	2	74	230	243

=== Conference standings ===
National Conference	GP	W	L	OTL	SOL	PTS	GF	GA
Idaho Steelheads (DAL)	72	48	17	2	5	103	260	191
Bakersfield Condors (ANA)	72	38	29	4	1	81	232	243
Alaska Aces (STL)	72	36	28	4	4	80	232	240
Utah Grizzlies (NYI)	72	34	29	4	5	77	260	253
Las Vegas Wranglers (PHX)	72	34	30	4	4	76	234	257
Stockton Thunder (EDM)	72	33	29	2	7	76	235	241
Victoria Salmon Kings (VAN)	72	34	32	4	2	74	230	243
Ontario Reign (LA)	72	31	31	3	7	72	214	229

== Schedule and results ==
=== Regular season ===
2009–10 Game log

October: 1–6–0–0 (Home: 1–3–0–0; Road: 0–3–0–0)
#	Date	Visitor	Score	Home	OT	Decision	Attendance	Record	Pts
1	October 16	Victoria	1–2	Alaska		Murray	5,163	0–1–0–0	0
2	October 17	Victoria	3–5	Alaska		Murray	4,949	0–2–0–0	0
3	October 19	Victoria	1–2	Alaska		Fisher	3,740	0–3–0–0	0
4	October 21	Bakersfield	3–1	Victoria		Fisher	4,569	0–4–0–0	0
5	October 23	Bakersfield	0–3	Victoria		Fisher	3,955	1–4–0–0	2
6	October 24	Bakersfield	4–3	Victoria		Murray	4,718	1–5–0–0	2
7	October 30	Stockton	5–1	Victoria		Fisher	3,371	1–6–0–0	2

November: 5–5–1–0 (Home: 4–2–0–0; Road: 1–3–1–0)
#	Date	Visitor	Score	Home	OT	Decision	Attendance	Record	Pts
8	November 1	Stockton	5–2	Victoria		Fisher	3,489	1–7–0–0	2
9	November 6	Victoria	1–4	Ontario		Fisher	6,288	1–8–0–0	2
10	November 7	Victoria	3–4	Ontario		Murray	5,505	1–9–0–0	2
11	November 11	Ontario	0–2	Victoria		Keetley	3,922	2–9–0–0	4
12	November 13	Ontario	4–2	Victoria		Keetley	3,829	2–10–0–0	4
13	November 14	Ontario	0–4	Victoria		Keetley	4,020	3–10–0–0	6
14	November 18	Victoria	5–3	Idaho		Shantz	3,050	4–10–0–0	8
15	November 20	Victoria	0–4	Idaho		Shantz	3,912	4–11–0–0	8
16	November 21	Victoria	4–5	Idaho	OT	Shantz	3,946	4–11–1–0	9
17	November 27	Ontario	1–2	Victoria		Shantz	3,952	5–11–1–0	11
18	November 28	Ontario	0–5	Victoria		Shantz	3,768	6–11–1–0	13

December: 11–2–2–0 (Home: 8–0–0–0; Road: 2–2–2–0)
#	Date	Visitor	Score	Home	OT	Decision	Attendance	Record	Pts
19	December 1	Victoria	3–4	Las Vegas	OT	Shantz	2,347	6–11–2–0	14
20	December 3	Victoria	5–7	Las Vegas		Fisher	3,409	6–12–2–0	14
21	December 4	Victoria	1–2	Las Vegas		Shantz	4,722	6–13–2–0	14
22	December 6	Victoria	3–4	Ontario	OT	Shantz	6,419	6–13–3–0	15
23	December 10	Las Vegas	2–4	Victoria		Shantz	3,871	7–13–3–0	17
24	December 11	Las Vegas	2–4	Victoria		Shantz	3,421	8–13–3–0	19
25	December 12	Las Vegas	4–5	Victoria	OT	Fisher	3,831	9–13–3–0	21
26	December 16	Stockton	2–7	Victoria		Shantz	3,842	10–13–3–0	23
27	December 18	Stockton	0–2	Victoria		Shantz	3,675	11–13–3–0	25
28	December 19	Stockton	3–4	Victoria		Fisher	4,051	12–13–3–0	27
29	December 27	Alaska	3–7	Victoria		Fisher	4,660	13–13–3–0	29
30	December 28	Alaska	4–5	Victoria		Fisher	5,115	14–13–3–0	31
31	December 30	Victoria	5–4	Utah		Shantz	3,135	15–13–3–0	33
32	December 31	Victoria	3–2	Utah	SO	Shantz	2,988	16–13–3–0	35

January: 9–4–1–0 (Home: 5–1–0–0; Road: 4–3–1–0)
#	Date	Visitor	Score	Home	OT	Decision	Attendance	Record	Pts
33	January 2	Victoria	6–2	Alaska		Shantz	4,517	17–13–3–0	37
34	January 3	Victoria	3–2	Alaska	SO	Shantz	3,652	18–13–3–0	39
35	January 4	Victoria	3–5	Alaska		Shantz	3,327	18–14–3–0	39
36	January 8	Idaho	2–5	Victoria		Shantz	4,145	19–14–3–0	41
37	January 9	Idaho	8–2	Victoria		Shantz	4,394	19–15–3–0	41
38	January 12	Las Vegas	3–5	Victoria		Shantz	4,221	20–15–3–0	43
39	January 13	Las Vegas	4–6	Victoria		Shantz	3,970	21–15–3–0	45
40	January 15	Bakersfield	3–6	Victoria		Shantz	3,791	22–15–3–0	47
41	January 16	Bakersfield	5–6	Victoria	SO	Shantz	5,443	23–15–3–0	49
42	January 22	Victoria	3–4	Bakersfield	OT	Shantz	5,910	23–15–4–0	51
43	January 23	Victoria	2–1	Bakersfield		Shantz	6,827	24–15–4–0	52
44	January 27	Victoria	3–7	Stockton		Shantz	3,549	24–16–4–0	52
45	January 28	Victoria	1–7	Stockton		Irving	5,758	24–17–4–0	52
46	January 30	Victoria	1–0	Stockton	SO	Fisher	9,158	25–17–4–0	54

February: 5–4–0–2 (Home: 4–1–0–1; Road: 1–3–0–1)
#	Date	Visitor	Score	Home	OT	Decision	Attendance	Record	Pts
47	February 3	Utah	6–7	Victoria	SO	Fisher	4,307	26–17–4–0	56
48	February 5	Utah	4–3	Victoria	SO	Irving	4,790	26–17–4–1	57
49	February 6	Utah	2–3	Victoria	SO	Irving	4,553	27–17–4–1	59
50	February 11	Alaska	2–6	Victoria		Fisher	4,324	28–17–4–1	61
51	February 13	Alaska	5–3	Victoria		Irving	4,791	28–18–4–1	61
52	February 14	Alaska	1–5	Victoria		Irving	3,838	29–18–4–1	63
53	February 17	Victoria	2–3	Utah	SO	Irving	2,848	29–18–4–2	64
54	February 19	Victoria	5–2	Utah		Fisher	5,910	30–18–4–2	66
55	February 20	Victoria	1–3	Utah		Irving	5,235	30–19–4–2	66
56	February 26	Victoria	2–3	Bakersfield		Fisher	5,038	30–20–4–2	66
57	February 27	Victoria	2–4	Bakersfield		Irving	5,568	30–21–4–2	66

March: 3–10–0–0 (Home: 0–4–0–0; Road: 3–6–0–0)
#	Date	Visitor	Score	Home	OT	Decision	Attendance	Record	Pts
58	March 3	Victoria	1–4	Stockton		Fisher	3,944	30–22–4–2	66
59	March 5	Victoria	5–3	Stockton		Fisher	5,794	31–22–4–2	68
60	March 6	Victoria	3–7	Stockton		Fisher	8,042	31–23–4–2	68
61	March 10	Idaho	5–2	Victoria		Keetley	4,574	31–24–4–2	68
62	March 12	Idaho	7–1	Victoria		Keetley	4,936	31–25–4–2	68
63	March 13	Idaho	5–3	Victoria		Keetley	4,811	31–26–4–2	68
64	March 17	Victoria	2–7	Stockton		Keetley	4,072	31–27–4–2	68
65	March 19	Victoria	5–1	Bakersfield		Fisher	6,846	32–27–4–2	70
66	March 20	Victoria	2–3	Bakersfield		Fisher	6,214	32–28–4–2	70
67	March 24	Victoria	0–5	Idaho		Keetley	3,965	32–29–4–2	70
68	March 26	Victoria	1–0	Idaho		Fisher	4,796	33–29–4–2	72
69	March 27	Victoria	1–5	Idaho		Fisher	5,300	33–30–4–2	72
70	March 31	Utah	2–1	Victoria		Keetley	5,355	33–31–4–2	72

April: 1–1–0–0 (Home: 1–1–0–0; Road: 0–0–0–0)
#	Date	Visitor	Score	Home	OT	Decision	Attendance	Record	Pts
71	April 2	Utah	2–9	Victoria		Fisher	5,991	34–31–4–2	74
72	April 3	Utah	5–2	Victoria		Fisher	7,006	34–32–4–2	74

Legend: Win (2 points) Loss (0 points) Overtime/shootout loss (1 point)

=== Playoffs ===
2010 Kelly Cup playoffs

National Conference quarter-final vs. (2) Bakersfield Condors: Bakersfield won series 3–2
#	Date	Visitor	Score	Home	OT	Decision	Attendance	Series
1	April 7	Bakersfield	3–6	Victoria		Keetley	3,191	1–0
2	April 8	Bakersfield	4–2	Victoria		Keetley	3,344	1–1
3	April 10	Victoria	3–1	Bakersfield		Keetley	5,603	2–1
4	April 11	Victoria	2–5	Bakersfield		Keetley	3,732	2–2
5	April 12	Victoria	1–2	Bakersfield		Keetley	4,083	2–3

Legend: Win Loss

== Player stats ==
=== Skaters ===
Note: GP = Games played; G = Goals; A = Assists; Pts = Points; +/- = Plus/minus; PIM = Penalty minutes

Regular season

Player	GP	G	A	Pts	+/-	PIM
Chad Painchaud	65	30	38	68	+4	65
Wes Goldie	72	44	18	62	-11	31
Olivier Latendresse	47	16	31	47	+10	38
Randall Gelech	63	21	25	46	-7	36
Jimmy Sharrow^{†}	57	11	34	45	-5	43
Olivier Filion	63	12	31	43	-9	48
Dirk Southern	56	10	24	34	-7	14
Adam Taylor	69	13	18	31	-1	68
Mike Hamilton	65	6	23	29	-16	106
Andy Brandt	64	13	15	28	-6	36
Scott Howes	47	12	14	26	-8	20
Patrick Coulombe	51	9	17	26	+14	43
Gary Gladue	69	3	22	25	-8	50
Matt Siddall^{†}	21	6	15	21	+1	55
Brandon Roach	64	4	13	17	-5	26
Tim Wedderburn	67	3	12	15	+5	22
Taylor Ellington	48	3	11	14	-13	49
Lance Morrison	40	4	4	8	-4	12
Mike Burgoyne	6	1	3	4	-1	7
Dan Gendur^{‡}	8	0	4	4	+2	6
Bryan Leitch^{†‡}	10	1	3	4	+4	4
Eric Walsky	9	1	2	3	-7	10
Jeff Lynch	5	1	0	1	-1	0
Neil Petruic	3	0	1	1	-3	2
Mike Salekin	10	0	1	1	-3	28
Andy Rogers	11	0	1	1	-4	8
Rob Smith	11	0	1	1	0	4
Bobby Davey^{†‡}	10	0	1	1	-1	43
Jason Bast	1	0	0	0	-2	0
Paul Bezzo	2	0	0	0	-1	0
David Cianfrini	2	0	0	0	-2	7
Jay Henderson	2	0	0	0	+1	19
Brady Leavold	2	0	0	0	0	0
Mark Magnowski	2	0	0	0	-4	0
Yannick Tifu^{‡}	6	0	0	0	-5	6

Playoffs

Player	GP	G	A	Pts	+/-	PIM
Wes Goldie	5	3	3	6	-2	6
Jimmy Sharrow	5	1	5	6	-2	4
Chad Painchaud	5	5	0	5	-2	0
Eric Walsky	5	1	4	5	-1	2
Olivier Filion	5	2	1	3	-1	2
Dirk Southern	5	1	2	3	-2	0
Andy Brandt	5	1	1	2	-2	2
Matt Siddall	5	0	2	2	0	0
Tim Wedderburn	5	0	2	2	+1	0
Kris Fredheim	5	0	1	1	+1	0
Gary Gladue	5	0	1	1	-2	6
Jason Bast	1	0	0	0	0	0
Lance Morrison	1	0	0	0	-2	0
Scott Howes	3	0	0	0	-1	0
Patrick Coulombe	5	0	0	0	0	2
Randall Gelech	5	0	0	0	-1	0
Brandon Roach	5	0	0	0	-4	0
Adam Taylor	5	0	0	0	-1	4

=== Goaltenders ===
Note: GP = Games played; Min = Minutes played; W = Wins; L = Losses; OT = Overtime losses; SOL = Shootout losses; GA = Goals against; GAA= Goals against average; Sv% = Save percentage; SO= Shutouts

Regular season

Player	GP	Min	W	L	OT	SOL	GA	GAA	Sv%	SO
David Shantz	28	1585	18	5	4	0	76	2.88	.910	2
Leland Irving	8	490	2	4	0	2	25	3.06	.908	0
Glenn Fisher	29	1558	12	12	0	0	87	3.35	.895	3
John Murray^{‡}	4	235	0	4	0	0	15	3.84	.870	0
Matt Keetley	9	484	2	7	0	0	31	3.84	.880	2

Playoffs

Player	GP	Min	W	L	GA	GAA	Sv%	SO
Matt Keetley	5	298	2	3	13	2.62	.904	0

^{†}Denotes player spent time with another team before joining Victoria. Stats reflect time with the Salmon Kings only.
^{‡}Denotes player no longer with the team. Stats reflect time with Salmon Kings only.

== Professional affiliations ==
=== Vancouver Canucks ===
The Salmon Kings' NHL affiliate based in Vancouver, British Columbia.

=== Manitoba Moose ===
The Salmon Kings' AHL affiliate based in Winnipeg, Manitoba.
