= 2008–09 Victoria Salmon Kings season =

2008-09 Victoria Salmon Kings
- League: 8th ECHL
- Division: 3rd West
- Conference: 3rd National
- 2008-09 record: 38-27-2-5
- Home record: 21-12-2-1
- Road record: 17-15-0-4
- Goals for: 232
- Goals against: 200

Team information
- General manager: Mark Morrison
- Coach: Mark Morrison
- Assistant coach: Ryan Wade; Steve Lingren
- Captain: Wes Goldie
- Alternate captains: Tim Wedderburn; Matt Kelly
- Arena: Save-On-Foods Memorial Centre
- Average attendance: 4,923

Team leaders
- Goals: Wes Goldie (48)
- Assists: Chris St. Jacques (42)
- Points: Wes Goldie (66)
- Penalty minutes: Daryl Lloyd (141)
- Plus/minus: Patrick Coulombe (+20)
- Wins: Todd Ford (17)
- Goals against average: Jonathan Boutin (2.37)

The 2008–09 Victoria Salmon Kings season is the Salmon Kings' 5th season in the ECHL. The season started with the Salmon Kings raising their West Division Championship banner above the arena floor, and continued towards the All Star break with the team establishing a 15-game winning streak between December 8, 2008 and January 10, 2009, which was second all time in ECHL history. With a 26-9-1-2 record at the end of the streak, and well in first place in their division, another banner seemed well within reach. However, the team went 12-19-0-4 afterwards and dropped to third place, which ensured a Kelly Cup playoff first round match-up against the Idaho Steelheads. In the playoffs, the Salmon Kings swept their first ever series by eliminating the Steelheads in round one in four straight games. Unfortunately in the second round, the Salmon Kings were eliminated from the playoffs by their arch rivals, the Alaska Aces in five games. Their lone win was a 4-0 shutout on home ice, their second shutout of the playoffs. Despite their second straight second round elimination, the '08–'09 season saw a number of team records. Dylan Yeo became the first Salmon King player to win a league award, as he was awarded the Defenseman of the Year. Also, team captain Wes Goldie set a new team record with 48 goals, while also becoming the first Salmon King to collect 200 points with the team. Finally, the team broke their previous attendance record with 4,923 fans, up from 4,871 the previous year and 4,248 in '06–'07.

== Standings ==
West Division	GP	W	L	OTL	SOL	PTS	GF	GA
Alaska Aces (STL)	72	45	24	1	2	93	232	181
Idaho Steelheads (DAL)	72	44	24	2	2	92	224	186
Victoria Salmon Kings (VAN)	72	38	27	2	5	83	232	200
Utah Grizzlies (NYI)	72	28	28	6	10	72	220	246
Phoenix RoadRunners (SJS)	72	30	37	2	3	65	200	246

== Schedule and results ==
=== Regular season ===
2008–09 Game log

October: 3–5–0–0 (Home: 2–3–0–0; Road: 1–2–0–0)
#	Date	Visitor	Score	Home	OT	Decision	Attendance	Record	Pts
1	October 17	Victoria	1–7	Phoenix		Boutin	4,434	0–1–0–0	0
2	October 18	Victoria	1–2	Phoenix		Ford	3,356	0–2–0–0	0
3	October 19	Victoria	4–2	Phoenix		Ford	2,762	1–2–0–0	2
4	October 24	Stockton	5–2	Victoria		Ford	6,602	1–3–0–0	2
5	October 25	Stockton	2–5	Victoria		Boutin	4,192	2–3–0–0	4
6	October 26	Stockton	3–1	Victoria		Ford	3,733	2–4–0–0	4
7	October 29	Utah	3–4	Victoria		Boutin	4,021	3–4–0–0	6
8	October 31	Utah	3–2	Victoria		Ford	3,151	3–5–0–0	6

November: 8–2–1–1 (Home: 3–2–1–0; Road: 5–0–0–1)
#	Date	Visitor	Score	Home	OT	Decision	Attendance	Record	Pts
9	November 1	Utah	4–3	Victoria		Boutin	4,354	3–6–0–0	6
10	November 5	Victoria	3–0	Bakersfield		Boutin	8,008	4–6–0–0	8
11	November 7	Victoria	2–3	Stockton	SO	Boutin	8,027	4–6–0–1	9
12	November 8	Victoria	3–1	Stockton		Ford	9,737	5–6–0–1	11
13	November 14	Phoenix	1–4	Victoria		Boutin	4,590	6–6–0–1	13
14	November 15	Phoenix	0–9	Victoria		Boutin	4,340	7–6–0–1	15
15	November 19	Alaska	6–3	Victoria		Boutin	4,168	7–7–0–1	15
16	November 21	Alaska	1–4	Victoria		Boutin	4,429	8–7–0–1	17
17	November 22	Alaska	4–3	Victoria	OT	Boutin	4,661	8–7–1–1	18
18	November 26	Victoria	4–2	Utah		Ford	2,637	9–7–1–1	20
19	November 28	Victoria	3–2	Utah	OT	Ford	2,969	10–7–1–1	22
20	November 29	Victoria	2–1	Utah		Ellis	3,949	11–7–1–1	24

December: 10–2–0–0 (Home: 6–0–0–0; Road: 4–2–0–0)
#	Date	Visitor	Score	Home	OT	Decision	Attendance	Record	Pts
21	December 3	Victoria	2–3	Ontario		Ellis	3,566	11–8–1–1	24
22	December 5	Victoria	2–3	Fresno		Ford	2,492	11–9–1–1	24
23	December 6	Victoria	5–1	Fresno		Ellis	3,075	12–9–1–1	26
24	December 7	Victoria	3–2	Ontario		Ford	4,447	13–9–1–1	28
25	December 9	Bakersfield	0–2	Victoria		Ellis	4,565	14–9–1–1	30
26	December 12	Phoenix	0–7	Victoria		Ford	4,249	15–9–1–1	32
27	December 14	Phoenix	2–6	Victoria		Ellis	4,339	16–9–1–1	34
28	December 17	Alaska	2–4	Victoria		Ford	4,162	17–9–1–1	36
29	December 19	Alaska	0–4	Victoria		Ford	4,772	18–9–1–1	38
30	December 20	Alaska	3–5	Victoria		Ford	4,627	19–9–1–1	40
31	December 27	Victoria	4–1	Stockton		Boutin	6,968	20–9–1–1	42
32	December 28	Victoria	5–2	Stockton		Ford	5,534	21–9–1–1	44

January: 8–3–0–2 (Home: 6–1–0–0; Road: 2–2–0–2)
#	Date	Visitor	Score	Home	OT	Decision	Attendance	Record	Pts
33	January 2	Bakersfield	2–5	Victoria		Ford	4,664	22–9–1–1	46
34	January 3	Bakersfield	1–2	Victoria		Boutin	4,633	23–9–1–1	48
35	January 4	Bakersfield	1–6	Victoria		Boutin	4,475	24–9–1–1	50
36	January 9	Ontario	2–5	Victoria		Boutin	5,573	25–9–1–1	52
37	January 10	Ontario	2–5	Victoria		Ellis	6,083	26–9–1–1	54
38	January 14	Victoria	2–3	Alaska	SO	Ellis	3,827	26–9–1–2	55
39	January 16	Victoria	3–5	Alaska		Boutin	4,497	26–10–1–2	55
40	January 17	Victoria	0–1	Alaska	SO	Ford	5,117	26–10–1–3	56
41	January 23	Victoria	2–1	Las Vegas	SO	Ford	5,108	27–10–1–3	58
42	January 24	Victoria	4–2	Las Vegas		Ford	7,232	28–10–1–3	60
43	January 25	Victoria	2–6	Las Vegas		Ellis	3,593	28–11–1–3	60
44	January 27	Stockton	3–7	Victoria		Ford	5,075	29–11–1–3	62
45	January 28	Stockton	2–0	Victoria		Ellis	5,102	29–12–1–3	62

February: 2–8–1–1 (Home: 0–3–1–0; Road: 2–5–0–1)
#	Date	Visitor	Score	Home	OT	Decision	Attendance	Record	Pts
46	February 4	Las Vegas	4–2	Victoria		Ford	4,652	29–13–1–3	62
47	February 6	Las Vegas	4–2	Victoria		Ford	6,263	29–14–1–3	62
48	February 7	Las Vegas	2–1	Victoria		Ellis	6,470	29–15–1–3	62
49	February 8	Las Vegas	1–0	Victoria	OT	Ellis	5,835	29–15–2–3	63
50	February 11	Victoria	3–4	Alaska		Ford	3,563	29–16–2–3	63
51	February 13	Victoria	2–1	Alaska		Ellis	5,355	30–16–2–3	65
52	February 14	Victoria	2–3	Alaska	SO	Ellis	5,574	30–16–2–4	66
53	February 15	Victoria	2–5	Alaska		Ford	4,187	30–17–2–4	66
54	February 18	Victoria	3–5	Ontario		Ellis	4,582	30–18–2–4	66
55	February 21	Victoria	4–3	Bakersfield	SO	Ford	5,178	31–18–2–4	68
56	February 22	Victoria	2–5	Bakersfield		Ford	4,155	31–19–2–4	68
57	February 23	Victoria	2–5	Ontario		Ellis	4,876	31–20–2–4	68

March: 7–7–0–1 (Home: 4–3–0–1; Road: 3–4–0–0)
#	Date	Visitor	Score	Home	OT	Decision	Attendance	Record	Pts
58	March 4	Victoria	2–3	Idaho		Ford	3,230	31–21–2–4	68
59	March 6	Victoria	5–6	Idaho		Ford	4,669	31–22–2–4	68
60	March 7	Victoria	1–4	Idaho		Ellis	4,170	31–23–2–4	68
61	March 11	Ontario	4–9	Victoria		Ellis	4,997	32–23–2–4	70
62	March 13	Ontario	4–3	Victoria		Ford	4,629	32–24–2–4	70
63	March 14	Ontario	3–4	Victoria	SO	Ellis	5,632	33–24–2–4	72
64	March 15	Ontario	1–3	Victoria		Ellis	5,547	34–24–2–4	74
65	March 18	Idaho	4–3	Victoria	SO	Ellis	5,296	34–24–2–5	75
66	March 20	Idaho	0–2	Victoria		Ford	5,601	35–24–2–5	77
67	March 21	Idaho	7–1	Victoria		Ellis	6,314	35–25–2–5	77
68	March 22	Idaho	4–2	Victoria		Ford	5,448	35–26–2–5	77
69	March 24	Victoria	5–2	Stockton		Ford	3,819	36–26–2–5	79
70	March 25	Victoria	5–3	Bakersfield		Ellis	3,861	37–26–2–5	81
71	March 27	Victoria	3–7	Bakersfield		Ford	6,000	37–27–2–5	81
72	March 28	Victoria	5–4	Stockton	OT	Ellis	8,668	38–27–2–5	83

Legend: Win (2 points) Loss (0 points) Overtime/shootout loss (1 point)

=== Playoffs ===
2009 Kelly Cup playoffs

West Division semi-final vs. (2) Idaho Steelheads: Victoria won series 4–0
#	Date	Visitor	Score	Home	OT	Decision	Attendance	Series
1	April 11	Victoria	3–1	Idaho		Ford	2,789	1–0
2	April 12	Victoria	2–0	Idaho		Ford	1,978	2–0
3	April 15	Idaho	2–9	Victoria		Ford	4,086	3–0
4	April 17	Idaho	1–2	Victoria	OT	Ford	4,973	4–0

West Division final vs. (1) Alaska Aces: Alaska won series 4–1
#	Date	Visitor	Score	Home	OT	Decision	Attendance	Series
1	April 24	Victoria	0–3	Alaska		Ford	4,933	0–1
2	April 25	Victoria	3–8	Alaska		Ford	5,533	0–2
3	April 29	Alaska	5–2	Victoria		Ford	4,449	0–3
4	May 1	Alaska	0–4	Victoria		Ellis	4,656	1–3
5	May 2	Alaska	6–4	Victoria		Ellis	2,471	1–4

Legend: Win Loss

== Player stats ==
=== Skaters ===
Note: GP = Games played; G = Goals; A = Assists; Pts = Points; +/- = Plus/minus; PIM = Penalty minutes

Regular season

Player	GP	G	A	Pts	+/-	PIM
Wes Goldie	72	48	18	66	-7	62
Chris St. Jacques	70	17	42	59	+16	36
Olivier Filion	69	12	40	52	-12	89
Matt Kelly	62	10	36	46	+4	91
Dylan Yeo	52	10	33	43	+15	30
Curtis Billsten^{†}	60	11	28	39	+18	30
Dan Gendur	52	9	29	38	0	97
Darryl Lloyd	72	18	18	36	+10	141
Olivier Labelle	56	16	19	35	+1	128
Shaun Landolt	67	12	20	32	-3	46
Sean D. O'Connor	60	19	8	27	-3	68
Scott Howes	39	10	12	22	+9	15
Patrick Coulombe	56	6	16	22	+20	36
Tim Wedderburn	70	2	19	21	+17	44
Gary Gladue	55	0	20	20	+13	12
Adam Taylor	27	9	6	15	+1	4
Brady Leavold	31	10	4	14	+2	49
Jacob Dietrich ^{‡}	35	7	6	13	+6	14
Jordie Benn	55	1	11	12	-7	26
Aaron Brocklehurst^{†}	23	2	7	9	-5	14
Travis Ramsey	26	0	4	4	+1	45
Jeremy Swanson ^{‡}	13	0	2	2	-2	12
Marc Fulton	3	0	1	1	0	6
Milan Gajic ^{‡}	4	0	1	1	-5	0
Devon Lang	4	0	1	1	0	5
Mike Nesdill ^{‡}	2	0	0	0	-2	0
Jeremy Schenderling	3	0	0	0	1	0

Playoffs

Player	GP	G	A	Pts	+/-	PIM
Olivier Labelle	9	4	3	7	+2	32
Olivier Filion	9	3	4	7	-2	14
Wes Goldie	9	3	4	7	-2	2
Chris St. Jacques	9	2	4	6	+2	6
Matt Kelly	6	1	5	6	+7	4
Aaron Brocklehurst	9	2	3	5	-1	10
Shaun Landolt	9	2	3	5	+2	4
Sean D. O'Connor	9	2	3	5	+1	21
Patrick Coulombe	9	1	4	5	-1	6
Gary Gladue	8	0	5	5	-1	4
Scott Howes	7	3	1	4	+1	19
Adam Taylor	9	2	2	4	+2	8
Brady Leavold	7	1	3	4	-1	8
Daryl Lloyd	9	1	3	4	+1	31
Dan Gendur	2	1	2	3	0	0
Tim Wedderburn	9	0	2	2	+2	0
Curtis Billsten	3	0	1	1	0	2
Jordie Benn	3	0	0	0	-2	0
Dylan Yeo	9	0	0	0	0	8

=== Goaltenders ===
Note: GP = Games played; Min = Minutes played; W = Wins; L = Losses; OT = Overtime losses; SOL = Shootout losses; GA = Goals against; GAA= Goals against average; Sv% = Save percentage; SO= Shutouts

Regular season

Player	GP	Min	W	L	OT	SOL	GA	GAA	Sv%	SO
Jonathan Boutin^{‡}	16	936	10	4	1	1	37	2.37	.921	2
Todd Ford	35	2019	17	15	0	1	89	2.64	.915	4
Julien Ellis	23	1398	11	8	1	3	63	2.70	.915	1

Playoffs

Player	GP	Min	W	L	GA	GAA	Sv%	SO
Todd Ford	7	413	4	3	17	2.47	.920	1
Julien Ellis	3	139	1	1	8	3.45	.882	1

^{†}Denotes player spent time with another team before joining Victoria. Stats reflect time with the Salmon Kings only.
^{‡}Denotes player no longer with the team. Stats reflect time with Salmon Kings only.

== Transactions ==
=== Trades ===
November 21, 2008	To Victoria Salmon Kings Free Trade	To Phoenix RoadRunners Jeremy Swanson
January 27, 2009	To Victoria Salmon Kings Free Trade	To South Carolina Stingrays Jonathan Boutin
January 31, 2009	To Victoria Salmon Kings Free Trade	To Cincinnati Cyclones Jacob Dietrich
February 10, 2009	To Victoria Salmon Kings Aaron Brocklehurst	To Florida Everblades Milan Gajic

=== Free agents acquired ===
Player	Former team
Olivier Filion	Alaska Aces
Olivier Labelle	Utah Grizzlies
Shaun Landolt	Sterzing (Italy)
Sean D. O'Connor	Phoenix RoadRunners
Scott Howes	Saint John Sea Dogs (QMJHL)
Adam Taylor	Florida Everblades
Brady Leavold	Norfolk Admirals (AHL)
Jordie Benn	Victoria Grizzlies (BCHL)
Travis Ramsey	University of Maine (NCAA)
Marc Fulton	Texas Wildcatters
Devon Lang	Victoria Grizzlies (BCHL)
Jordan Foote	Michigan Tech (NCAA)
Todd Ford	Columbia Inferno
Jonathan Boutin	Norfolk Admirals (AHL)
Mike Nesdill	Bowling Green State University (NCAA)
Jeremy Schenderling	Columbia Inferno

=== Free agents lost ===
Player	New team
Ash Goldie	Herlev Hornets (Denmark)
Derek Krestanovich	
Ryan Wade	Retired
Jordan Krestanovich	Cortina SG (Italy)
Marc-Andre Bernier	
Kevin Estrada	Kassel Huskies (DEL)
Kiel McLeod	Cortina SG (Italy)
Paul Ballantyne	
Darren Deschamps	
Simon Lambert	Oklahoma City Blazers (CHL)
Brad Zanon	Florida Everblades
Billy Thompson	Tilburg Trappers (Hlnd)

== Professional affiliations ==
=== Vancouver Canucks ===
The Salmon Kings' NHL affiliate based in Vancouver, British Columbia.

=== Manitoba Moose ===
The Salmon Kings' AHL affiliate based in Winnipeg, Manitoba.
