= Eric Walsky =

Swiss-American ice hockey player

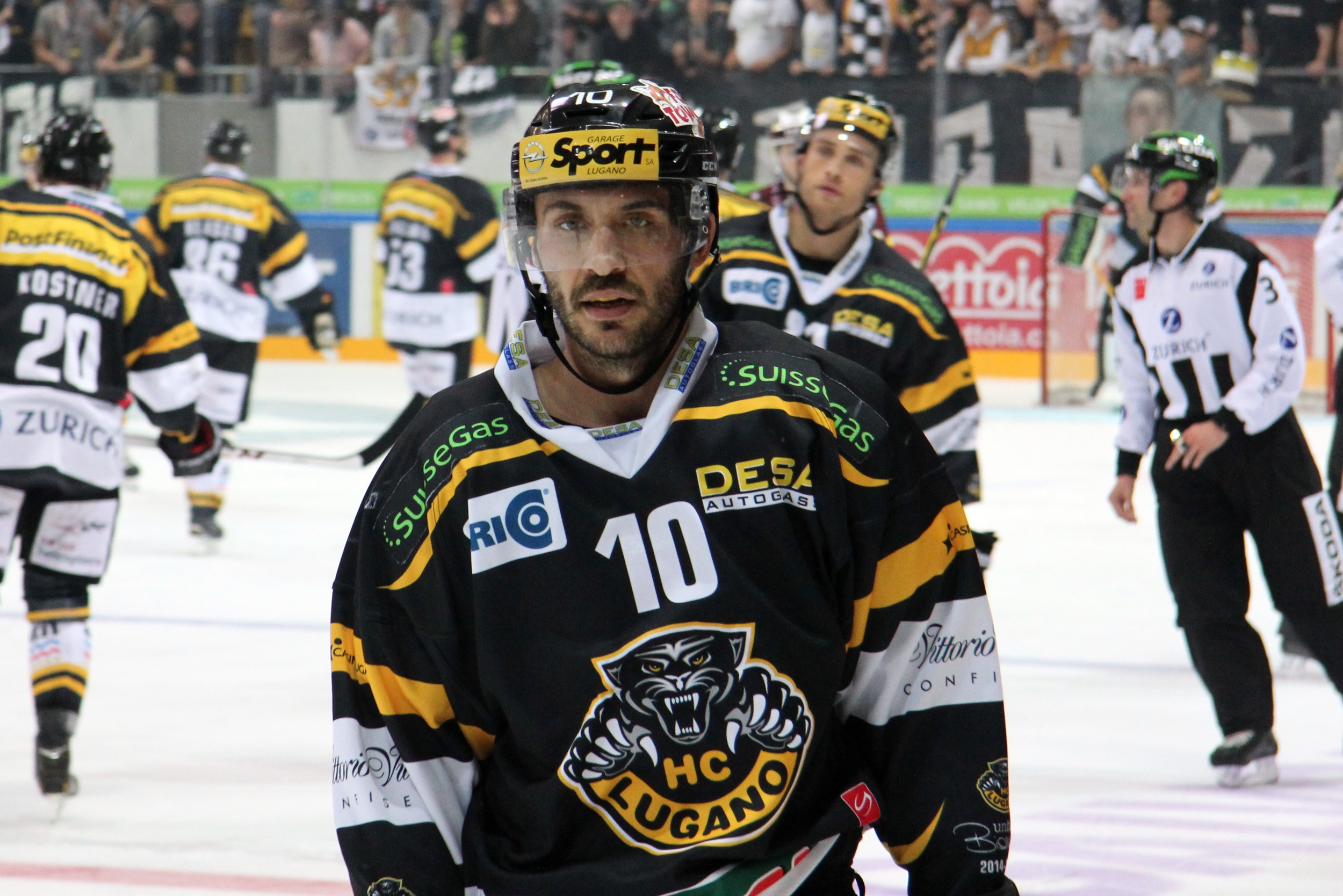
- Walsky with HC Lugano in 2014
- Born: September 30, 1984 (age 41) Anchorage, Alaska, U.S.
- Height: 5 ft 11 in (180 cm)
- Weight: 194 lb (88 kg; 13 st 12 lb)
- Position: Right wing
- Shot: Right
- Played for: Genève-Servette HC; Manitoba Moose; HC Lugano; Lausanne HC
- NHL draft: Undrafted
- Playing career: 2009–2017

Eric Walsky (born September 30, 1984) is a Swiss-American former professional ice hockey right winger. He played most of his career in the National League (NL) with Genève-Servette HC, HC Lugano, Lausanne HC and on loan with the SC Rapperswil-Jona Lakers.

== Playing career ==
Undrafted, Walsky played with the River City Lancers of the USHL before committing to a four-year collegiate career split between the University of Alaska-Anchorage and Colorado College. Upon completing his senior year with the Tigers, Walsky signed a contract with the Vancouver Canucks of the National Hockey League on March 20, 2009. He then joined the Canucks American Hockey League affiliate, the Manitoba Moose, on an amateur try-out to conclude the 2008–09 season.

In the 2009–10 season, Eric was assigned to Moose to begin his first professional season. He played only 37 games with Manitoba before he was reassigned to secondary affiliate the Victoria Salmon Kings of the ECHL. He then signed a three-year contract with Genève-Servette HC of the Swiss NLA on June 7, 2010. In January 2013, he signed, with fellow Geneva teammate Dan Fritsche, a three-year contract with the HC Lugano through the end of the 2016 season.

Walsky was forced to retire from professional hockey prior to the 2017-18 season because of multiple concussion issues.

== Career statistics ==
			Regular season					Playoffs
Season	Team	League	GP	G	A	Pts	PIM	GP	G	A	Pts	PIM
2003–04	River City Lancers	USHL	45	9	16	25	16	3	0	0	0	0
2004–05	University of Alaska-Anchorage	WCHA	16	3	4	7	2	—	—	—	—	—
2005–06	University of Alaska-Anchorage	WCHA	35	3	12	15	14	—	—	—	—	—
2007–08	Colorado College	WCHA	41	12	8	20	14	—	—	—	—	—
2008–09	Colorado College	WCHA	38	12	24	36	24	—	—	—	—	—
2008–09	Manitoba Moose	AHL	5	0	2	2	0	—	—	—	—	—
2009–10	Manitoba Moose	AHL	37	2	9	11	6	—	—	—	—	—
2009–10	Victoria Salmon Kings	ECHL	9	1	2	3	84	5	1	4	5	2
2010–11	Genève-Servette HC	NLA	47	10	13	23	16	6	5	5	10	2
2011–12	Genève-Servette HC	NLA	21	5	7	12	8	—	—	—	—	—
2012–13	Genève-Servette HC	NLA	17	1	7	8	2	2	0	0	0	0
2013–14	HC Lugano	NLA	39	6	7	13	14	5	5	5	10	2
2014–15	HC Lugano	NLA	32	6	8	14	8	—	—	—	—	—
2014–15	Rapperswil-Jona	NLA	7	0	3	3	0	—	—	—	—	—
2015–16	Lausanne HC	NLA	45	6	6	12	12	—	—	—	—	—
2016–17	Lausanne HC	NLA	36	8	16	24	20	—	—	—	—	—
AHL totals			42	2	11	13	6	—	—	—	—	—
NLA totals			244	42	67	109	80	12	5	5	10	2
