= Patrick Coulombe =

Canadian ice hockey player

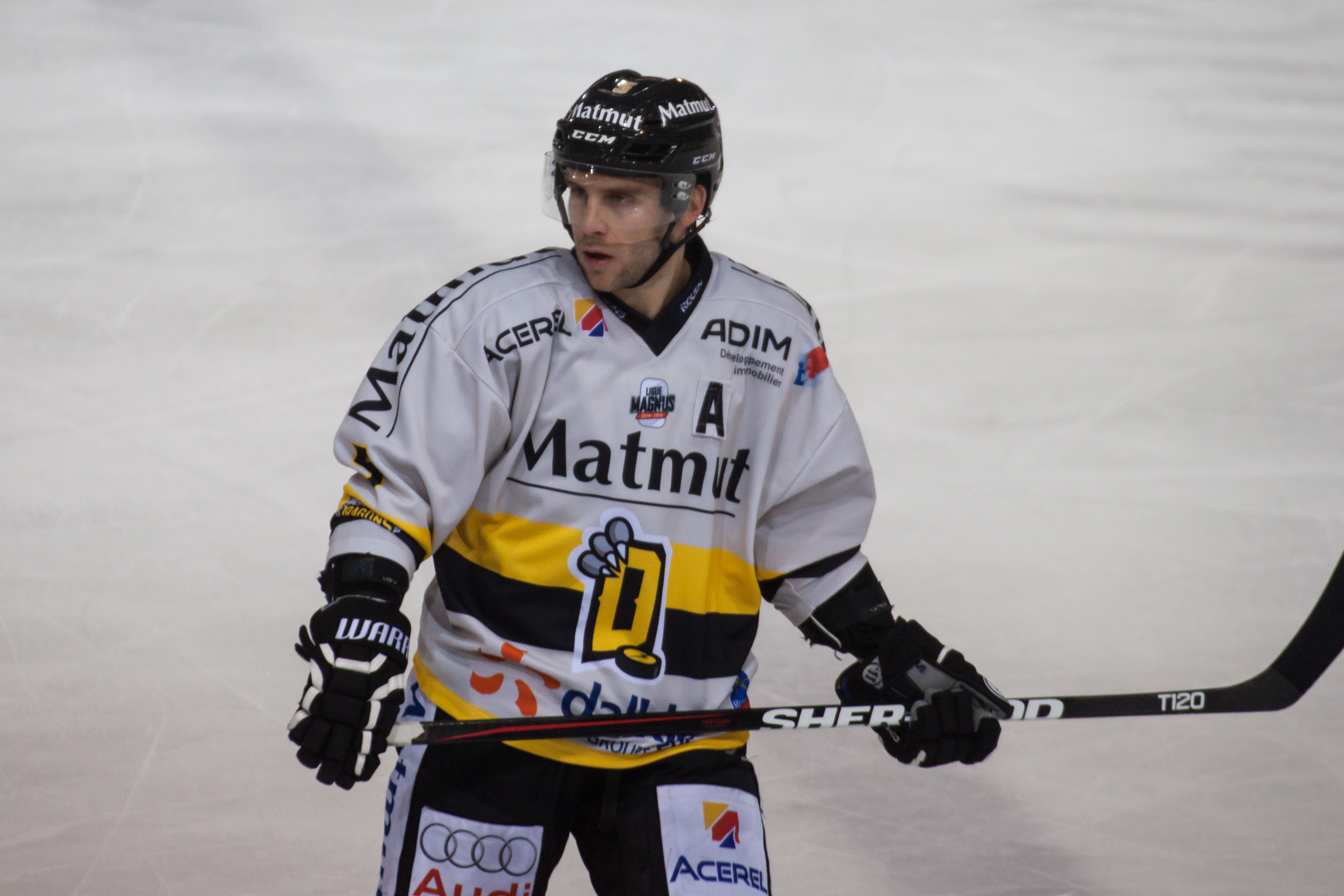
- Patrick Coulomb, 2014
- Born: April 23, 1985 (age 41) Saint-Fabien, Quebec, Canada
- Height: 5 ft 9 in (175 cm)
- Weight: 185 lb (84 kg; 13 st 3 lb)
- Position: Defence
- Shoots: Left
- France team Former teams: Jokers de Cergy-Pontoise; Vancouver Canucks; Vålerenga; HDD Olimpija Ljubljana; Graz 99ers Dragons de Rouen
- NHL draft: Undrafted
- Playing career: 2006–present

Patrick Coulombe (born April 23, 1985) is a Canadian professional ice hockey defenceman who currently plays for the Jokers de Cergy-Pontoise of the French Ligue Magnus.

== Playing career ==
As a youth, Coulombe played in the 1998 and 1999 Quebec International Pee-Wee Hockey Tournaments with the Rimouski Océanic minor ice hockey team.

Coulombe played junior ice hockey with the Rimouski Océanic of the QMJHL, joining them in 2001. In his draft year of 2002–03, he emerged as a key component of the Océanic blueline and was selected to represent Canada at the IIHF World U18 Championships. However, he was passed over in the 2003 NHL entry draft as he was judged to be too small to play defence effectively at the pro level. This would be the first of three times he would be passed over in the draft.

For the 2003–04, Rimouski added junior phenom Sidney Crosby to their roster and instantly became one of the top teams in the QMJHL. Coulombe was a beneficiary of this, as he became a fixture on the Océanic powerplay and his numbers skyrocketed. By 2004–05, Coulombe was one of the highest-scoring defenders in the league, finishing with 8 goals and 68 points as Rimouski romped to both the regular-season and playoff QMJHL championships before losing in the Memorial Cup to the London Knights.

In 2005–06, Coulombe was dealt mid-season to the Chicoutimi Saguenéens, as Rimouski began to rebuild after Crosby left for the NHL. He would again set career highs with 23 goals and 77 points, although Chicoutimi failed in their bid to reach the Memorial Cup.

After his junior career, Coulombe signed a pro contract with the Manitoba Moose of the AHL. As the Moose are the minor-pro affiliate of the Vancouver Canucks, Coulombe received an opportunity to attend the Canucks' rookie camp and training camp. Still not considered NHL material before this chance, he surprised Canuck management with his performance and ended up being the team's final cut on the eve of the 2005–06 NHL season.

Coulombe was returned to Manitoba, but signed an NHL contract with the Canucks on October 31, 2006, and was called up to Vancouver when their blueline suffered an injury crunch. He made his NHL debut on November 9, 2006, against the Anaheim Ducks.

On July 1, 2014, Coulombe left the Austrian Hockey League after two seasons with HDD Olimpija Ljubljana and the Graz 99ers to sign a one-year contract with the French club, Dragons de Rouen of the Ligue Magnus.

== International play ==
Coulombe represented Canada at the 2003 IIHF World U18 Championships, recording 2 points and a +5 rating in 7 games en route to a gold medal, Canada's first ever in the tournament.

Coulombe was also invited to the training camp for Canada's entry in the 2005 World Junior Ice Hockey Championships. However, the team was extremely deep owing to the 2004–05 NHL lockout and he was a late cut.

== Career statistics ==
=== Regular season and playoffs ===
			Regular season					Playoffs
Season	Team	League	GP	G	A	Pts	PIM	GP	G	A	Pts	PIM
2000–01	Jonquière Élites	QMAAA	23	1	2	3	19	—	—	—	—	—
2001–02	Rimouski Oceanic	QMJHL	34	0	8	8	30	7	0	3	3	2
2001–02	Jonquière Élites	QMAAA	33	5	16	21	18	—	—	—	—	—
2002–03	Rimouski Oceanic	QMJHL	72	6	25	31	48	—	—	—	—	—
2003–04	Rimouski Oceanic	QMJHL	59	7	38	45	32	9	0	5	5	0
2004–05	Rimouski Oceanic	QMJHL	70	8	60	68	46	13	2	17	19	6
2005–06	Rimouski Oceanic	QMJHL	29	5	23	28	18	—	—	—	—	—
2005–06	Chicoutimi Sagueneens	QMJHL	33	18	31	49	22	9	2	10	12	6
2006–07	Vancouver Canucks	NHL	7	0	1	1	4	—	—	—	—	—
2006–07	Manitoba Moose	AHL	44	3	6	9	22	1	0	0	0	0
2006–07	Victoria Salmon Kings	ECHL	6	0	3	3	2	6	0	2	2	0
2007–08	Manitoba Moose	AHL	2	0	0	0	0	—	—	—	—	—
2007–08	Victoria Salmon Kings	ECHL	58	8	22	30	40	11	0	5	5	4
2008–09	Victoria Salmon Kings	ECHL	56	7	15	22	36	9	1	4	5	6
2009–10	Victoria Salmon Kings	ECHL	51	9	17	26	43	5	0	0	0	2
2010–11	Elmira Jackals	ECHL	51	12	22	34	32	2	0	0	0	0
2010–11	Binghamton Senators	AHL	6	2	0	2	2	3	0	2	2	0
2010–11	Milwaukee Admirals	AHL	5	1	0	1	2	—	—	—	—	—
2011–12	Vålerenga	NOR	44	17	35	52	58	13	2	7	9	6
2012–13	Olimpija Ljubljana	EBEL	45	7	22	29	26	—	—	—	—	—
2012–13	Olimpija Ljubljana	SVN	—	—	—	—	—	3	1	1	2	2
2013–14	Graz 99ers	EBEL	50	5	9	14	30	—	—	—	—	—
2014–15	Dragons de Rouen	FRA	25	7	16	23	12	4	3	1	4	2
2015–16	Dragons de Rouen	FRA	26	3	16	19	16	15	2	11	13	4
2016–17	Dragons de Rouen	FRA	39	5	14	19	10	19	3	5	8	6
2017–18	Ducs d'Angers	FRA	28	3	14	17	18	5	0	0	0	0
2018–19	Ducs d'Angers	FRA	44	4	24	28	34	5	0	2	2	0
2019–20	Ducs d'Angers	FRA	37	7	32	39	28	4	0	1	1	4
ECHL totals			222	36	79	115	153	33	1	11	12	12
FRA totals			199	29	116	145	118	52	8	20	28	12
NHL totals			7	0	1	1	4	—	—	—	—	—

=== International ===
Year	Team	Event	GP	G	A	Pts	PIM
2003	Canada	U18	7	0	2	2	2
Junior totals			2	0	2	2	2
