= 2010–11 ECHL season =

Ice hockey league season

- League: ECHL
- Sport: Ice hockey
- Duration: October 5, 2010 – April 2, 2011
- Total attendance: 2,967,752 (total); 4,339 (average)

Regular season
- Brabham Cup: Alaska Aces
- Season MVP: Wes Goldie
- Top scorer: Justin Donati

Playoffs
- Eastern champions: Kalamazoo Wings
- Eastern runners-up: Wheeling Nailers
- Western champions: Alaska Aces
- Western runners-up: Victoria Salmon Kings
- Playoffs MVP: Scott Howes

Kelly Cup
- Champions: Alaska Aces
- Runners-up: Kalamazoo Wings

ECHL seasons
- 2009–10 2011–12

The 2010–11 ECHL season was the 23rd season of the ECHL. The regular season schedule ran from October 15, 2010, to April 2, 2011. The Kelly Cup playoffs followed the regular season, with the first playoff game held on April 4, 2011, and the final game (between the Alaska Aces and the Kalamazoo Wings) held on May 21, 2011. The league welcomed one new franchise, a relocation of the Johnstown Chiefs to Greenville, South Carolina, who played in the BI-LO Center. The ECHL held its annual All-Star Game and Skills Challenge on January 26 at Rabobank Arena in Bakersfield, California, home of the Bakersfield Condors.

== League business ==
=== Team changes ===
In February 2010, Charlotte Checkers owner Michael Kahn purchased the Albany River Rats of the American Hockey League from Capital District Sports and the team relocated to Charlotte for the 2010–11 season. Rumors had surfaced that the franchise rights that were held by the Checkers would be transferred to an ownership group with plans of putting a team at the San Diego Sports Arena in San Diego, California, but instead Charlotte returned its franchise to the ECHL.

Also in February 2010, the Johnstown Chiefs, the only member from the original five teams to compete in the league's inaugural season to stay in its original city, announced that they would be relocating to Greenville, South Carolina, following the completion of the 2009–10 season. On February 15, 2010, the Greenville Arena District Board announced that they had agreed to a five-year deal to bring the Chiefs to Greenville's BI-LO Center and the ECHL Board of Governors approved the relocation of the Johnstown franchise to Greenville on February 17.

=== All-star game ===
The 2011 ECHL All-Star Game was played on January 26, 2011, and was hosted by the Bakersfield Condors at Rabobank Arena. The format featured the host team Condors taking on the ECHL All-Star team. The All-Stars won 9–3.

== Regular season ==
Final league standings:

=== Conference standings ===
Eastern Conference	GP	W	L	OTL	SOL	GF	GA	PTS
z-Greenville Road Warriors*	72	46	22	3	1	255	192	96
y-Reading Royals*	72	44	23	2	3	257	220	93
y-Kalamazoo Wings*	72	40	24	2	6	255	225	88
x-Wheeling Nailers	72	38	29	0	5	230	210	81
x-South Carolina Stingrays	72	37	29	3	3	194	204	80
x-Florida Everblades	72	37	30	1	4	236	222	79
x-Cincinnati Cyclones	72	33	29	6	4	199	229	76
x-Elmira Jackals	72	32	30	7	3	249	264	74
e-Toledo Walleye	72	33	33	4	2	239	255	72
e-Gwinnett Gladiators	72	30	34	3	5	203	250	68
e-Trenton Devils	72	27	37	2	6	218	257	62

x – clinched playoff spot, y – clinched division title, z – clinched best conference record, e – eliminated from playoff contention

* – division leader

Western Conference	GP	W	L	OTL	SOL	GF	GA	PTS
b-Alaska Aces*	72	47	22	2	1	241	174	97
y-Bakersfield Condors*	72	41	27	2	2	222	210	86
x-Stockton Thunder	72	37	23	5	7	232	210	86
x-Las Vegas Wranglers	72	38	29	3	2	216	203	81
x-Idaho Steelheads	72	32	27	4	9	225	217	77
x-Utah Grizzlies	72	33	32	4	3	189	227	73
x-Victoria Salmon Kings	72	32	36	2	2	217	234	68
e-Ontario Reign	72	27	39	2	4	195	269	60

x – clinched playoff spot, y – clinched division title, b – clinched Brabham Cup, best record in the conference and first round bye, e – eliminated from playoff contention

* – division leader

=== Divisional standings ===
Eastern Conference

Atlantic Division	GP	W	L	OTL	SOL	GF	GA	PTS
y-Reading Royals* (TOR)	72	44	23	2	3	257	220	93
x-Elmira Jackals (ANA/OTT)	72	32	30	7	3	249	264	74
Trenton Devils (NJ)	72	27	37	2	6	218	257	62

North Division	GP	W	L	OTL	SOL	GF	GA	PTS
y-Kalamazoo Wings* (NYI)	72	40	24	2	6	255	225	88
x-Wheeling Nailers (MTL/PIT)	72	38	29	0	5	230	210	81
x-Cincinnati Cyclones (BUF/NAS)	72	33	29	6	4	199	229	76
Toledo Walleye (CHI/DET)	72	33	33	4	2	239	255	72

South Division	GP	W	L	OTL	SOL	GF	GA	PTS
y-Greenville Road Warriors* (NYR/PHI)	72	46	22	3	1	255	192	96
x-South Carolina Stingrays (WAS)	72	37	29	3	3	194	204	80
x-Florida Everblades (TB/CAR)	72	37	30	1	4	236	222	79
Gwinnett Gladiators (ATL)	72	30	34	3	5	203	250	68

Note: GP = Games played; W = Wins; L = Losses; T = Ties; OTL = Overtime loss; SOL = Shootout loss; GF = Goals for; GA = Goals against; Pts = Points

Western Conference

Pacific Division	GP	W	L	OTL	SOL	GF	GA	PTS
y-Bakersfield Condors* (MIN)	72	41	27	2	2	222	210	86
x-Stockton Thunder (SJ/EDM)	72	37	23	5	7	232	210	86
x-Las Vegas Wranglers (PHX)	72	38	29	3	2	216	203	81
Ontario Reign (LA)	72	27	39	2	4	195	269	60

Mountain Division	GP	W	L	OTL	SOL	GF	GA	PTS
y-Alaska Aces* (STL)	72	47	22	2	1	241	174	97
x-Idaho Steelheads (DAL)	72	32	27	4	9	225	217	77
x-Utah Grizzlies (CGY)	72	33	32	4	3	189	227	73
x-Victoria Salmon Kings (VAN)	72	32	36	2	2	217	234	68

Note: GP = Games played; W = Wins; L = Losses; T = Ties; OTL = Overtime loss; SOL = Shootout loss; GF = Goals for; GA = Goals against; Pts = Points

== 2010–11 Kelly Cup Playoffs ==
=== 2011 Kelly Cup playoffs format ===
The format for the 2011 Kelly Cup playoffs remained unchanged from the previous season.

In the Eastern Conference, postseason berths were awarded to the first-place team in each division and the next five teams in the conference, based on points. The division winners were seeded first, second and third and played the eighth-place finisher, the seventh-place finisher and the sixth-place finisher, respectively, while the fourth-place finisher and the fifth-place finisher met. The conference semifinals had the winner of the first-place and eighth-place match-up meet the winner of the fourth-place and fifth-place game while the winner of the second-place and seventh-place game faced the winner of the third-place and sixth-place match-up.

In the Western Conference, postseason berths were awarded to the first-place team in each division and the next five teams in the conference, based on points. The division winner with the best record in the conference received a bye in the first round. The other division winner was seeded second and met the team that finished seventh in the conference in the first round. The other first round matchups were the third-place finisher in the conference against the sixth-place finisher in the conference and the fourth-place finisher in the conference against the fifth-place finisher in the conference. The conference semifinals had the first-place finisher meet the winner of the fourth-place and fifth-place matchup and the winner of the second-place finisher and seventh-place finisher against the winner of the third-place finisher and the sixth-place finisher.

The first round in each Conference was a best of five series with each subsequent round being a best of seven series.

=== Bracket ===
Conference quarterfinals	Conference semifinals
1	Greenville	3
8	Elmira	1
1	Greenville	3
4	Wheeling	4
4	Wheeling	3
5	South Carolina	1
Eastern Conference
2	Reading	3
7	Cincinnati	1
2	Reading	0
3	Kalamazoo	4
3	Kalamazoo	3
6	Florida	1
1	Alaska	–
8	BYE	–
1	Alaska	4
5	Idaho	0
4	Las Vegas	2
5	Idaho	3
Western Conference
2	Bakersfield	1
7	Victoria	3
7	Victoria	4
6	Utah	0
3	Stockton	1
6	Utah	3

Conference finals
4	Wheeling	2
3	Kalamazoo	4
1	Alaska	4
7	Victoria	0

Kelly Cup finals
W1	Alaska	4
E3	Kalamazoo	1

== ECHL awards ==
Patrick Kelly Cup:	Alaska Aces
Henry Brabham Cup:	Alaska Aces
Gingher Memorial Trophy:	Kalamazoo Wings
Bruce Taylor Trophy:	Alaska Aces
John Brophy Award:	Brent Thompson (Alaska Aces)
CCM U+ Most Valuable Player:	Wes Goldie (Alaska Aces)
Kelly Cup Playoffs Most Valuable Player:	Scott Howes (Alaska Aces)
Reebok Hockey Goaltender of the Year:	Gerald Coleman (Alaska Aces)
CCM Rookie of the Year:	Ben Street (Wheeling Nailers)
Defenseman of the Year:	Eric Regan (Elmira Jackals)
Leading Scorer:	Justin Donati (Elmira Jackals)
Reebok Plus Performer Award:	Trent Daavettila (Kalamazoo Wings); Brendan Connolly (Greenville Road Warriors)
Sportsmanship Award:	Brian Swanson (Alaska Aces)
Birmingham Memorial Award:	Paul Carnathan

=== All-ECHL Teams ===
All-ECHL First Team

(Canada) F Mark Derlago (Idaho)
(Canada) F Wes Goldie (Alaska)
(Canada) F Kory Karlander (Kalamazoo)
(Canada) D Wes Cunningham (Greenville)
(Canada) D Eric Regan (Elmira)
(United States) G Gerald Coleman (Alaska)

All-ECHL Second Team

(United States) F Trent Daavettila (Kalamazoo)
(United States) F Ryan Ginand (Trenton)
(Canada) F Francis Lemieux (Bakersfield)
(Canada) D Jason Lepine (Toledo)
(United States) D Bryan Miller (Alaska)
(United States) G Dov Grumet-Morris (Greenville)

=== ECHL All-Rookie Team ===
ECHL-All Rookie Team

(United States) F Andy Bohmbach (Toledo)
(Canada) F Kael Mouillierat (Idaho)
(Canada) F Ben Street (Wheeling)
(Canada) D Mark Isherwood (Alaska)
(Canada) D Bobby Raymond (Florida)
(Canada) G Brian Stewart (Bakersfield)

== See also ==
- List of ECHL seasons
- 2010 in sports
- 2011 in sports
