= Tim Wedderburn =

Canadian ice hockey player

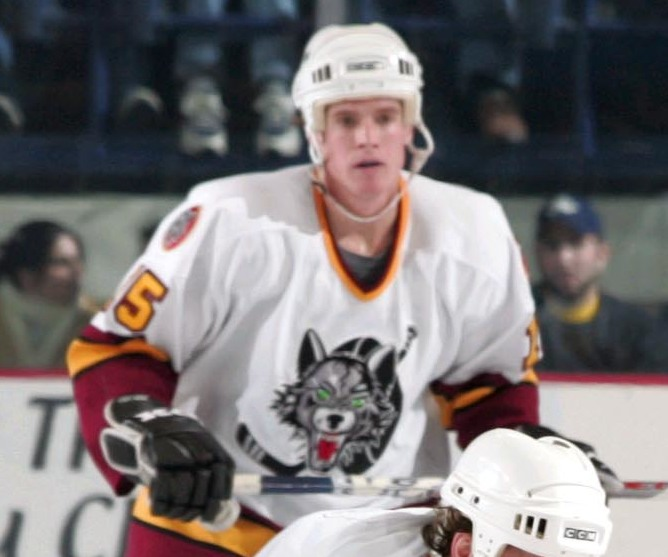
- Wedderburn with the Chicago Wolves in 2004
- Born: June 29, 1981 (age 43); Okotoks, Alberta, Canada
- Height: 6 ft 2 in (188 cm)
- Weight: 218 lb (99 kg; 15 st 8 lb)
- Position: Defence
- Shot: Left
- Played for: Hershey Bears; Utah Grizzlies; Chicago Wolves; SG Cortina; Lake Erie Monsters; Braehead Clan
- NHL draft: Undrafted
- Playing career: 2002–2012

Tim Wedderburn (born June 29, 1981) is a Canadian former professional ice hockey defenceman.

== Playing career ==
Wedderburn played major junior hockey with the Prince George Cougars of the Western Hockey League, then went on to play 10 seasons of professional hockey in North America and Europe. He played his final two seasons as an assistant captain with the Braehead Clan of the United Kingdom's Elite Ice Hockey League before hanging up his skates following the 2011–12 EIHL season.

== Career statistics ==
			Regular season					Playoffs
Season	Team	League	GP	G	A	Pts	PIM	GP	G	A	Pts	PIM
1998–99	Prince George Cougars	WHL	66	0	8	8	20	7	0	0	0	0
1999–00	Prince George Cougars	WHL	70	8	20	28	93	13	2	3	5	9
2000–01	Prince George Cougars	WHL	68	9	25	34	54	6	1	1	2	6
2001–02	Prince George Cougars	WHL	69	3	23	26	51	7	0	3	3	8
2001–02	San Diego Gulls	WCHL	1	0	0	0	0	8	0	0	0	4
2002–03	Hershey Bears	AHL	67	1	6	7	22	5	0	0	0	0
2003–04	Utah Grizzlies	AHL	67	3	11	14	53	—	—	—	—	—
2004–05	Chicago Wolves	AHL	65	0	10	10	60	18	1	2	3	23
2004–05	Rockford IceHogs	UHL	10	0	7	7	0	—	—	—	—	—
2005–06	Chicago Wolves	AHL	73	0	6	6	57	—	—	—	—	—
2006–07	Rockford IceHogs	UHL	40	2	8	10	24	—	—	—	—	—
2006–07	Chicago Wolves	AHL	1	0	0	0	0	—	—	—	—	—
2006–07	Hershey Bears	AHL	20	1	4	5	8	15	0	3	3	8
2007–08	SG Cortina	ITL	34	6	10	16	26	—	—	—	—	—
2008–09	Victoria Salmon Kings	ECHL	70	2	17	19	44	9	0	2	2	0
2009–10	Victoria Salmon Kings	ECHL	67	3	12	15	22	5	0	2	2	0
2009–10	Lake Erie Monsters	AHL	2	0	0	0	0	—	—	—	—	—
2010–11	Braehead Clan	EIHL	54	1	16	17	32	2	0	0	0	0
2011–12	Braehead Clan	EIHL	58	3	24	27	28	2	0	0	0	2
AHL totals			295	5	37	42	200	38	1	5	6	31
