= Travis Ramsey =

American ice hockey player (born 1983)

- Born: May 16, 1983 (age 43) Lakewood, California, U.S.
- Height: 6 ft 5 in (196 cm)
- Weight: 225 lb (102 kg; 16 st 1 lb)
- Position: Defense
- Shoots: Right
- Elite.A team Former teams: Ritten-Renon; Manitoba Moose; St. John's IceCaps
- NHL draft: Undrafted
- Playing career: 2008–present

Travis Ramsey (born May 16, 1983) is an American former professional ice hockey player. After playing four seasons with the Manitoba Moose of the American Hockey League (AHL), Ramsey followed the franchise after it was relocated by the Winnipeg Jets to sign with the St. John's IceCaps on July 20, 2011.

== Career statistics ==
			Regular season					Playoffs
Season	Team	League	GP	G	A	Pts	PIM	GP	G	A	Pts	PIM
2000–01	Butte Irish	AWHL	47	1	9	10	101	—	—	—	—	—
2001–02	Great Falls Americans	AWHL	29	1	6	7	76	—	—	—	—	—
2001–02	Helena Bighorns	AWHL	22	1	8	9	24	—	—	—	—	—
2002–03	Helena Bighorns	AWHL	56	9	20	29	65	—	—	—	—	—
2003–04	Salmon Arm Silverbacks	BCHL	57	5	19	24	150	10	0	3	3	12
2004–05	U. of Maine	HE	17	1	2	3	24	—	—	—	—	—
2005–06	U. of Maine	HE	42	1	5	6	32	—	—	—	—	—
2006–07	U. of Maine	HE	40	0	8	8	20	—	—	—	—	—
2007–08	U. of Maine	HE	34	4	8	12	26	—	—	—	—	—
2007–08	Manitoba Moose	AHL	7	0	1	1	4	—	—	—	—	—
2008–09	Victoria Salmon Kings	ECHL	26	0	4	4	45	—	—	—	—	—
2008–09	Manitoba Moose	AHL	36	2	7	9	40	19	0	1	1	14
2009–10	Manitoba Moose	AHL	80	2	14	16	87	6	0	1	1	23
2010–11	Manitoba Moose	AHL	57	0	12	12	63	14	0	3	3	6
2011–12	St. John's IceCaps	AHL	75	4	10	14	59	14	0	2	2	4
2012–13	St. John's IceCaps	AHL	50	1	5	6	28	—	—	—	—	—
2013–14	Ritten Sport	Italy-A	41	2	13	15	52	17	1	11	12	10
2014–15	Ritten Sport	Italy-A	32	7	16	23	30	—	—	—	—	—
AHL totals			305	9	49	58	281	53	0	7	7	47
