= Wes Goldie =

Canadian ice hockey player

- Born: May 5, 1979 (age 46) London, Ontario, Canada
- Height: 5 ft 10 in (178 cm)
- Weight: 180 lb (82 kg; 12 st 12 lb)
- Position: Right wing
- Shot: Right
- Played for: AHL; Bridgeport Sound Tigers; ECHL; Pee Dee Pride; Victoria Salmon Kings; Alaska Aces
- NHL draft: Undrafted
- Playing career: 2000–2012

Wes Goldie (born May 5, 1979) is a Canadian former professional ice hockey right winger who last played for the Alaska Aces of the ECHL. He is the ECHL's all-time leader in career goals with 370, and the seventh all-time career scorer with 605 points.

== Career ==
Goldie scored an ECHL-best 175 goals while not missing a single game over four seasons with the Victoria Salmon Kings, including 44 his final year, second only to Ryan Kinasewich. He also finished second in the league with 48 goals (a North American career-high) in 2009, when he earned first team all-ECHL honors, and 41 in 2007, while leading the ECHL with 42 in 2008. Goldie shared the league lead in shorthanded goals for three consecutive years beginning in 2007, scoring 19 over that span.

Goldie began his pro career under former Aces head coach Davis Payne with the Pee Dee Pride. Goldie played the 2003–04 season with the Pride under another former Alaska head coach, Perry Florio, and finishing tied for fourth in the league with 36 goals. In his lone recall to the AHL with Bridgeport in 2004, Goldie scored one goal in two games.

Prior to turning pro at the tail end of the 1999-2000 season, Goldie played four years in the Ontario Hockey League, scoring 121 over his last three campaigns, including a junior-best 46 in 1998–99. He missed the playoffs only once in his eight full seasons as a professional (2003–04), and owns 56 points (34 goals, 22 assists) in 61 career postseason games.

On March 24, 2012, in a loss against the Ontario Reign, Goldie broke the previous league all-time mark of 368 goals held by Rod Taylor. He retired as the league's all-time goal leader with 370.

In 2014, Goldie was inducted into the ECHL Hall of Fame.

== Career statistics ==
			Regular season					Playoffs
Season	Team	League	GP	G	A	Pts	PIM	GP	G	A	Pts	PIM
1995–96	St. Thomas Stars	WOHL	52	51	44	95	55	—	—	—	—	—
1995–96	London Knights	OHL	2	1	0	1	0	—	—	—	—	—
1996–97	Owen Sound Platers	OHL	66	10	16	26	29	4	1	0	1	0
1997–98	Owen Sound Platers	OHL	64	35	29	64	46	11	3	3	6	7
1998–99	Owen Sound Platers	OHL	61	46	37	83	63	13	11	3	14	10
1999–00	Owen Sound Platers	OHL	68	40	35	75	49	—	—	—	—	—
1999–00	Pee Dee Pride	ECHL	7	3	1	4	2	4	1	0	1	0
2000–01	Pee Dee Pride	ECHL	71	33	22	55	60	10	7	1	8	8
2001–02	Pee Dee Pride	ECHL	47	15	12	27	29	9	4	5	9	10
2002–03	Pee Dee Pride	ECHL	72	27	24	51	54	7	3	1	4	2
2003–04	Florence Pride	ECHL	70	36	25	61	43	—	—	—	—	—
2003–04	Bridgeport Sound Tigers	AHL	2	1	0	1	0	—	—	—	—	—
2004–05	Sorel-Tracy Mission	LNAH	59	57	26	83	14	—	—	—	—	—
2005–06	Sorel-Tracy Mission	LNAH	52	39	32	71	34	—	—	—	—	—
2006–07	Victoria Salmon Kings	ECHL	72	41	33	74	65	6	6	2	8	0
2007–08	Victoria Salmon Kings	ECHL	72	42	19	61	66	11	5	8	13	4
2008–09	Victoria Salmon Kings	ECHL	72	48	18	66	62	9	3	4	7	2
2009–10	Victoria Salmon Kings	ECHL	72	44	18	62	31	5	3	3	6	6
2010–11	Alaska Aces	ECHL	72	46	37	83	50	13	3	11	14	14
2011–12	Alaska Aces	ECHL	70	35	26	61	68	10	1	7	8	2
ECHL totals			697	370	235	605	530	84	36	42	78	48

Sporting positions
Preceded by Jordan Krestanovich	Victoria Salmon Kings team captain 2008 – 2010	Succeeded by Pete Vandermeer
