= Jimmy Sharrow =

American ice hockey player (born 1985)

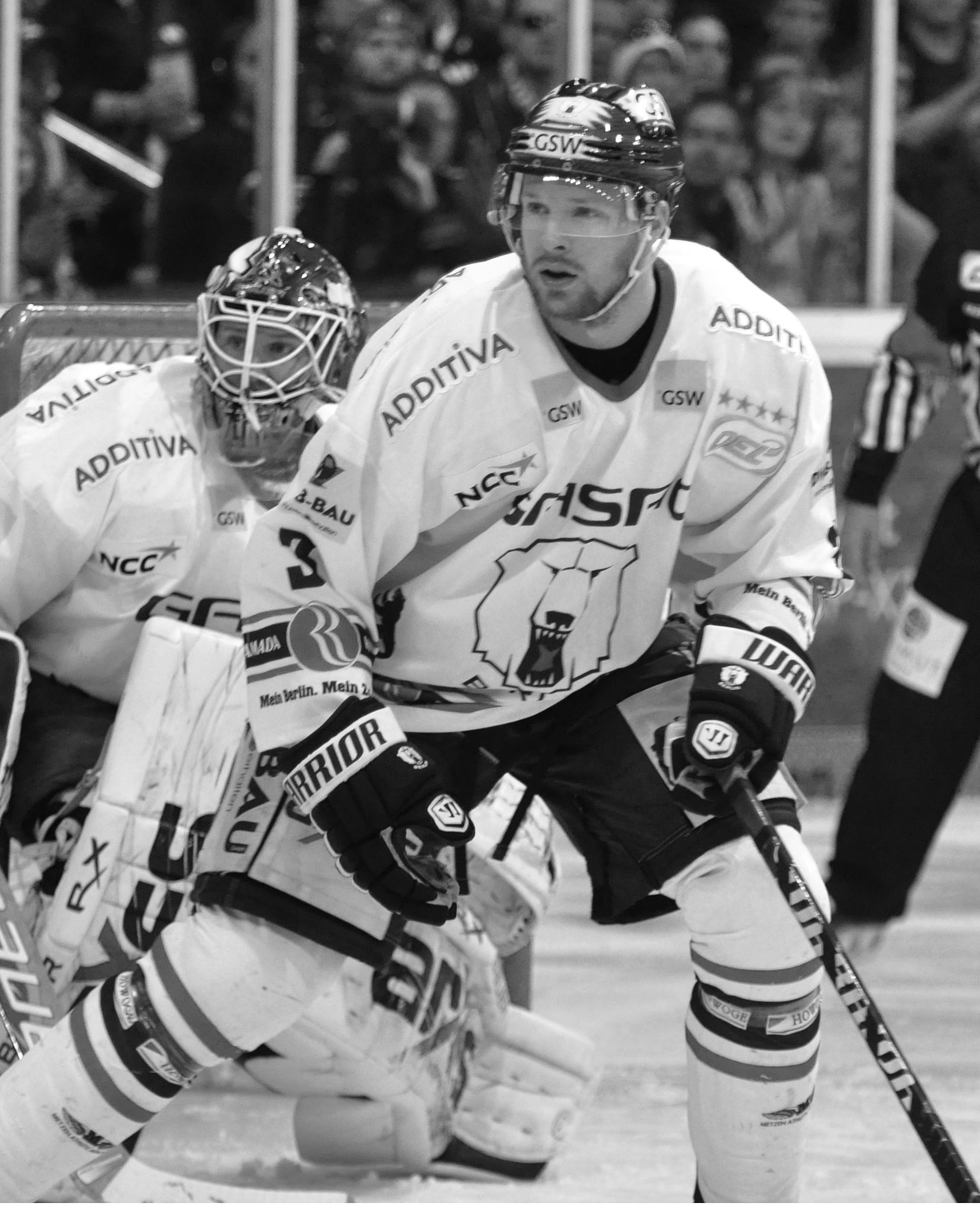
- Born: January 31, 1985 (age 41) Framingham, Massachusetts, U.S.
- Height: 6 ft 2 in (188 cm)
- Weight: 198 lb (90 kg; 14 st 2 lb)
- Position: Defense
- Shot: Right
- Played for: Chicago Wolves; Manitoba Moose; San Antonio Rampage; Eisbären Berlin; Grizzlys Wolfsburg; Heilbronner Falken
- NHL draft: 110th overall, 2003; Atlanta Thrashers
- Playing career: 2005–2019

James Sharrow (born January 31, 1985) is an American former professional ice hockey player.

== Playing career ==
Sharrow was drafted 110th overall by the Atlanta Thrashers in the 2003 NHL entry draft from the Halifax Mooseheads. Sharrow played for the Thrashers' AHL affiliate the Chicago Wolves and their ECHL affiliate the Gwinnett Gladiators. On June 23, 2007, Sharrow was traded to the Vancouver Canucks for Jesse Schultz.

He re-signed with Vancouver for one more year in July of 08 before on December 9, 2008, he was traded to the Chicago Blackhawks for a conditional draft pick. On November 11, 2009, he was signed by the Victoria Salmon Kings of the ECHL.

On July 21, 2010, Sharrow left for Europe and signed a one-year contract with Eisbären Berlin of the Deutsche Eishockey Liga.

After five seasons in Berlin, three DEL championships, one CHL championship, CHL best defensemen, Sharrow left Berlin as a free agent and signed a one-year deal with Grizzlys Wolfsburg on June 5, 2015.

After three years with Wolfsburg, making it to two DEL finals in three years, Sharrow signed with Heilbronner of the DEL2 league.

== Career statistics ==
=== Regular season and playoffs ===
			Regular season					Playoffs
Season	Team	League	GP	G	A	Pts	PIM	GP	G	A	Pts	PIM
2000–01	Cardigan Mountain School	HS Prep
2001–02	U.S. NTDP U17	USDP	61	5	16	21	30	—	—	—	—	—
2001–02	U.S. NTDP U18	NAHL	44	3	5	8	28	—	—	—	—	—
2002–03	Halifax Mooseheads	QMJHL	70	2	14	16	54	25	2	4	6	24
2003–04	Halifax Mooseheads	QMJHL	52	12	26	38	67	—	—	—	—	—
2004–05	Halifax Mooseheads	QMJHL	69	16	31	47	76	13	5	6	11	6
2005–06	Gwinnett Gladiators	ECHL	23	3	7	10	12	—	—	—	—	—
2005–06	Chicago Wolves	AHL	47	2	17	19	17	—	—	—	—	—
2006–07	Chicago Wolves	AHL	42	4	14	18	38	—	—	—	—	—
2007–08	Manitoba Moose	AHL	44	5	17	22	26	2	0	1	1	0
2008–09	Manitoba Moose	AHL	17	1	5	6	4	—	—	—	—	—
2008–09	Rockford IceHogs	AHL	50	3	5	8	40	4	0	1	1	0
2009–10	Wheeling Nailers	ECHL	4	1	1	2	2	—	—	—	—	—
2009–10	Victoria Salmon Kings	ECHL	57	11	34	45	43	5	1	5	6	4
2009–10	Manitoba Moose	AHL	1	0	0	0	0	—	—	—	—	—
2009–10	San Antonio Rampage	AHL	1	0	1	1	2	—	—	—	—	—
2010–11	Eisbären Berlin	DEL	49	4	13	17	20	12	1	2	3	8
2011–12	Eisbären Berlin	DEL	52	7	12	19	50	13	5	3	8	6
2012–13	Eisbären Berlin	DEL	50	3	14	17	83	12	1	1	2	16
2013–14	Eisbären Berlin	DEL	52	2	16	18	38	3	0	2	2	0
2014–15	Eisbären Berlin	DEL	50	4	10	14	89	3	1	1	2	0
2015–16	Grizzlys Wolfsburg	DEL	45	2	7	9	69	15	4	4	8	10
2016–17	Grizzlys Wolfsburg	DEL	51	3	9	12	36	18	0	1	1	10
2017–18	Grizzlys Wolfsburg	DEL	36	1	4	5	37	7	0	3	3	4
2018–19	Heilbronner Falken	DEL2	29	2	17	19	44	3	1	4	5	0
AHL totals			202	15	59	74	127	6	0	2	2	0
DEL totals			385	26	84	110	422	83	12	17	29	54

=== International ===
Year	Team	Event	GP	G	A	Pts	PIM
2002	United States	U17	6	1	7	8	4
Junior totals			6	1	7	8	4
