= Scott Howes =

Canadian ice hockey player (born 1987)

- Born: September 3, 1987 (age 38) Toronto, Ontario, Canada
- Height: 5 ft 11 in (180 cm)
- Weight: 190 lb (86 kg; 13 st 8 lb)
- Position: Left wing
- Shot: Left
- Played for: Manitoba Moose; Bridgeport Sound Tigers; Springfield Falcons; HDD Olimpija Ljubljana; Brampton Beast; Esbjerg Energy; Missouri Mavericks
- NHL draft: Undrafted
- Playing career: 2008–2016

Scott Howes (born September 3, 1987) is a Canadian former professional ice hockey forward, who last played with the Missouri Mavericks in the ECHL.

== Early life ==
Scott Howes attended Neil McNeil Catholic Secondary School where he played for the varsity boys team. During that time, he also played for the Wexford Raiders Junior "A" Team, where he led the team in points during the 05/06 season.

== Playing career ==
Scott Howes entered into a two-way contract with the Victoria Salmon Kings and the Manitoba Moose for the 2008-2009 season. Scott finished that season with 22 points over 39 games. The following year he recorded 26 points over 47 games. After a brief time with the Stockton Thunder, Scott moved to the Alaska Aces in 2010 where he recorded 58 points in just 59 games played. Scott had his contract extended with the Alaska Aces and started the 2011–12 ECHL season with the Aces, however, on November 19, 2011, Howes was called up to play with the Bridgeport Sound Tigers of the American Hockey League.

On August 12, 2013, Howes was signed to his first European contract, agreeing to a one-year deal with Slovenian club, HDD Olimpija Ljubljana, of the Austrian Hockey League. After only fours games with Olimpija, Howes sought a release from his contract to return to North America signing in the Central Hockey League, joining the Brampton Beast in their inaugural season on December 16, 2013. Howes immediately established himself within the Beats to score a prolific 45 points in 36 games.

On June 26, 2014, Howes opted to return to Europe, signing with Danish club, Esbjerg Energy of the Metal Ligaen on a one-year deal.

After one season in Denmark, Howes returned to the Brampton Beast for the 2015–16 ECHL season. Ahead of the trade deadline, he was traded to the Missouri Mavericks for future considerations. He played nine regular-season and three playoff games with the Mavericks, who lost to the Allen Americans in the Western Conference semifinals. Howes retired after the season.

== Awards and honours ==
- ECHL Kelly Cup Playoffs Most Valuable Player (2010–11)
- ECHL Player of the Week (12/27-01/02)
