= Toledo Bullfrogs =

Arena football team

- Toledo Bullfrogs
- Founded: 2008
- League: af2
- Based in: Toledo, Ohio
- Arena: Huntington Center
- Colors: Black, dark green, light green, orange, white
- Owner: Toledo Arena Sports, Inc.

The Toledo Bullfrogs were to be a professional arena football team based at the Lucas County Arena in Toledo, Ohio. They were scheduled to begin play in the af2, the developmental league of the Arena Football League, in 2010, until that league folded in 2009. The team never played a game and the Toledo Bullfrogs website now leads directly to the Toledo Walleye website.

== History ==
On September 22, 2008, Toledo Arena Sports, Inc. (a non-profit group led by the owners of the International League's Toledo Mud Hens which also owns the ECHL's Toledo Walleye), announced that an af2 franchise was coming to the arena.

On November 18, the Bullfrogs announced their name, logo, and colors. The name was chosen as an homage to the city sitting on what was formerly the Great Black Swamp, ergo, when the city was founded, there was a frog infestation. This heritage is also immortalized in the Lucas County Courthouse and Jail, where a frog is depicted in the floor mosaic.

On May 6, 2020, the Toledo Walleye revealed the uniforms that the Bullfrogs would have worn. They also sold Bullfrogs t-shirts on the Swamp Shop website.
