= 2009–10 ECHL season =

Ice hockey league season

- League: ECHL
- Sport: Ice hockey
- Duration: October 15, 2009 – April 3, 2010

Regular season
- Brabham Cup: Idaho Steelheads
- Season MVP: Tyler Donati (Elmira Jackals)
- Top scorer: Tyler Donati (Elmira Jackals)

Playoffs
- American champions: Cincinnati Cyclones
- American runners-up: Reading Royals
- National champions: Idaho Steelheads
- National runners-up: Stockton Thunder
- Playoffs MVP: Robert Mayer and Jeremy Smith

Kelly Cup
- Champions: Cincinnati Cyclones
- Runners-up: Idaho Steelheads

ECHL seasons
- ← 2008–09 2010–11 →

The 2009–10 ECHL season was the 22nd season of the ECHL. It ran from October, 2009 until April, 2010, followed by the Kelly Cup playoffs which lasted until May 21, 2010 as the Cincinnati Cyclones won their second Kelly Cup championship in three years by defeating the Idaho Steelheads in five games. The league welcomed two franchises to the league for the 2009–10 season with the return of the Toledo Storm as the Toledo Walleye, who will play in the Lucas County Arena in Toledo, Ohio, after a two-year suspension of the franchise to allow for the construction of their new arena, and the admission of the Kalamazoo Wings as an expansion franchise who will play in Wings Stadium in Kalamazoo, Michigan. The ECHL held its annual All-Star Game and Skills Challenge on January 19–20 at Citizens Business Bank Arena in Ontario, California, home of the Ontario Reign.

== League business ==
=== Team changes ===
==== Departures ====
Following the league's Mid-Season Board of Governors Meeting on March 27, 2009, the league announced that two teams had been granted one-year extensions to voluntary suspensions because of arena issues, two teams would suspend operations for the season and that one team would cease operations following the conclusion of the 2008–09 ECHL season. The economic crisis forced the ECHL to allow one-year extensions on voluntary suspensions for two teams in South Carolina, one in Columbia and one in Myrtle Beach. Both franchises awaited approvals for their new arenas in Irmo and Conway, respectively, as neither arena has begun construction.

The Dayton Bombers and the Mississippi Sea Wolves announced that they would be suspending operations for the 2009–10 season and had to present new business plans to the league in June 2009. Dayton owner Costa Papista cited declining support as the reason for the team being forced to suspend operations. Dayton averaged 3,679 fans per home game in 2008–09 (up slightly from 3,663 in 2007–08), but the Bombers would consistently fall short of the league's average attendance each year (4,218 in 2008–09). Papista stated that it is hard to sell hockey at the Bombers primary arena, the Nutter Center on the campus of Wright State University in Fairborn as the seating capacity is upwards of 9,500 and has proposed building a $30 million, 5,500-seat arena in downtown Dayton that would house professional hockey in Dayton. The proposal is being explored by the Greater Downtown Dayton Plan. The suspension ended Dayton's run of 18 seasons in the ECHL, the second longest to league founder Johnstown Chiefs' 21-year run. With a team in Cincinnati and the return of a team to Toledo, ECHL Commissioner Brian McKenna said that he would like to see Dayton return to the league, stating "We very much would like to be back in Dayton and, hopefully, some day we will be." However, two Fort Wayne, Indiana-based businessmen gained approval from the International Hockey League to revive the Dayton Gems franchise. With the new IHL franchise in place and a failed drive for season tickets and managing partnership to resume play for the 2010—11 season, the Bombers owners relinquished their team's membership in the ECHL at the Annual Board of Governors' Meeting in Las Vegas in June 2009.

Mississippi owner Mike Rogers and team president Bill Yates also announced that their team would suspend operations due to economic troubles that included travel expenses and low ticket sales. Mississippi became the latest team on the Interstate 10 corridor to cease operations, after the Baton Rouge Kingfish, Louisiana IceGators, Mobile Mysticks, and Pensacola Ice Pilots. Team president Bill Yates stated that the team intended to continue operations in the ECHL, including possibly playing in 2010–11, but there was still the possibility they may move the team to a new city or a different league, most notably the Central Hockey League. It was announced in May 2009 that Biloxi and Pensacola were expected to receive Southern Professional Hockey League (SPHL) franchises for the 2009–10 seasons; the SPHL also announced Lafayette, Louisiana would move to the SPHL. With the new SPHL franchise in place, the Sea Wolves former owners relinquished their team's membership in the ECHL at the Annual Board of Governors' Meeting.

The Phoenix RoadRunners told the Board of Governors that the team would not participate in the 2009–10 season and would cease operations effective immediately following the 2008–09 season. At the Annual Board of Governors' Meeting, Phoenix officially relinquished their membership in the ECHL.

After sitting out from the league for four seasons on voluntary suspension, the potential Myrtle Beach, South Carolina franchise (formerly the Pee Dee/Florence Pride) relinquished their franchise's membership in the league at the Annual Board of Governors' Meeting.

==== Additions ====
Following their two-year voluntary suspension due to construction of a new arena, the Toledo Walleye (formerly Toledo Storm) returned to the ECHL and competed at the Lucas County Arena in downtown Toledo. The Walleye brought back former Storm boss Nick Vitucci as the team's inaugural head coach and Joe Napoli served as the team's general manager. Napoli also served as the general manager and vice president of the Toledo Mud Hens minor league baseball club, which owned the Walleye, their co-anchor tenant Toledo Bullfrogs arena football team, and Lucas County Arena, under the Mud Hens subsidiary, Toledo Arena Sports, Inc.

On June 9, 2009, the ECHL welcomed the Kalamazoo Wings as an expansion member for the 2009–10 season. The Wings joined the American Conference's North Division, renewing old rivalries from the original IHL with Toledo and Cincinnati. The Wings became the second team in three years to jump from the new International Hockey League to the ECHL, following the Elmira Jackals who transferred from the IHL to the ECHL in time for the 2007–08 season. Kalamazoo's move to the ECHL was expected after the club announced they were leaving the IHL on June 3, 2009.

=== League realignment ===
With Phoenix ceasing operations, Dayton and Mississippi suspending operations for the season and Toledo being added, the ECHL found itself with 19 teams and in need for a realignment of its teams. Following the Mid-Season Board of Governors Meeting, the ECHL announced a new divisional alignment of 11 teams in the American Conference and 8 teams in the National Conference. In the American Conference, the expansion Toledo Walleye would move into the North Division, while the Reading Royals and Trenton Devils were forced to move from the North Division to the South Division. The Pacific and West Divisions of the National Conference will remain the same with the exception of the Phoenix Roadrunners and the Fresno Falcons who folded midway through the 2008-09 season.

On June 9, 2009, the ECHL announced that the newly admitted Kalamazoo Wings would compete in the American Conference's North Division bring the total number of teams in the North Division to six and the total number of teams in the American Conference to twelve.

Following the Annual Board of Governors' Meeting in June, the ECHL announced that it would establish a third division in the American Conference consisting of the Elmira, Johnstown, Reading and Trenton franchises. The move slightly balances the league as all five divisions have four members.

==== American Conference ====
===== East Division =====
- Elmira Jackals
- Johnstown Chiefs
- Reading Royals
- Trenton Devils

===== North Division =====
- Cincinnati Cyclones
- Kalamazoo Wings
- Toledo Walleye
- Wheeling Nailers

===== South Division =====
- Charlotte Checkers
- Florida Everblades
- Gwinnett Gladiators
- South Carolina Stingrays

==== National Conference ====
===== Pacific Division =====
- Bakersfield Condors
- Las Vegas Wranglers
- Ontario Reign
- Stockton Thunder

===== West Division =====
- Alaska Aces
- Idaho Steelheads
- Utah Grizzlies
- Victoria Salmon Kings

=== 2010 Kelly Cup Playoffs format ===
At the Annual Board of Governors' Meeting unanimously approved a new format for the Kelly Cup Playoffs in 2010 as follows:

The conference quarterfinals will be a best-of-five game series with the remaining rounds being best-of-seven game series. The best-of-five series will be a 2-3 format with the higher seed choosing if it wishes to host Games 1-2 or Games 3-5. Teams that are less than 350 miles apart may choose to play a 2-2-1 format.

In the National Conference, postseason berths will be awarded to the first-place team in each division and the next five teams in the conference, based on points. The division winner with the best record in the conference will receive a bye in the first round, the other division winner will play the 7th seed, and so on. The semifinals will put the Conference champion against the winner of the 4-5 seed games, and the other two series winners against each other.

In the American Conference, postseason berths will be awarded to the first-place team in each division and the next five teams in the conference, based on points, with the division winners being the top three seeds. The winners of the 1-8 matchup will play the winner of the 4-5 matchup in the first Conference semifinal series, and the other two winners will meet in the other semifinal.

==== Player roster revision ====
As well as the newly approved playoff format, the league also stated that the Injured Reserve would be abolished during the Kelly Cup Playoffs. Instead, the teams will have a maximum roster of 23 players for the postseason with 20 active players and up to three inactive players.

=== Other league business ===
During the Annual Board of Governors' Meeting in June, the league announced a few decisions set to try to stabilize the league. The first of which was the Board of Governors' unanimously re-electing Steve Chapman of the Gwinnett Gladiators as the Chairman of the Board of Governors for a fourth straight term. Chapman had been awarded the ECHL Executive of the Year Award in 2005 and 2006, the only person in league history to win the award multiple times.

With the four team difference between the American and National Conferences, the league revised its expansion policy. After having a membership as high as 40 during the ECHL-WCHL merger, the league capped the number of teams the league would allow to 24, with a priority of putting teams in the South and West. The league currently has 20 active members and two inactive members in Columbia, SC and Reno, NV.

The league received updates from the inactive Columbia Inferno and Reno, Nevada franchises who were granted a one-year extension to their voluntary suspensions. Columbia advised the Board that construction is scheduled to begin later in the Summer on the Lexington County Events Center and that the Inferno plan to return to the ice for the 2010-11 season. The team also announced that it retained the nucleus of its staff and plans to increase its preparation for 2010-11 in October. The Board unanimously approved a request from Reno for a one-year extension to its Home Arena Pending as the ownership group continues its work toward an arena project. The Reno franchise has been on voluntary suspension since the team was granted expansion rights in 2004.

Finally, the league announced the creation of the Playing Schedule Committee. The committee was created to examine the overall scheduling process. The committee will report to the Board at the Preseason Meeting in September regarding the timing and release of the schedule in coming seasons as well as the criteria to be used in creating the schedule.

== Regular season ==
Updated through April 1, 2010

=== Conference standings ===
American Conference	GP	W	L	OTL	SOL	GF	GA	PTS
z-Charlotte Checkers*	72	43	21	4	4	253	223	94
y-Kalamazoo Wings*	72	42	20	6	4	273	243	94
y-Elmira Jackals*	72	37	26	6	3	275	231	83
x-South Carolina Stingrays	72	41	19	6	6	248	216	94
x-Cincinnati Cyclones	72	44	25	1	2	235	200	91
x-Florida Everblades	72	38	25	4	5	234	221	85
x-Reading Royals	72	37	29	1	5	254	275	80
x-Toledo Walleye	72	35	30	2	5	254	274	77
e-Trenton Devils	72	33	30	4	5	244	252	75
e-Wheeling Nailers	72	33	32	2	5	240	249	73
e-Gwinnett Gladiators	72	31	33	5	3	243	277	70
e-Johnstown Chiefs	72	18	43	7	4	215	307	47

x - clinched playoff spot, y - clinched division title, z - clinched best conference record, e - eliminated from playoff contention

* – division leader

National Conference	GP	W	L	OTL	SOL	GF	GA	PTS
b-Idaho Steelheads *	72	48	17	2	5	260	191	103
y-Bakersfield Condors *	72	38	29	4	1	232	243	81
x-Alaska Aces	72	36	28	4	4	232	240	80
x-Utah Grizzlies	72	34	29	4	5	260	253	77
x-Las Vegas Wranglers	72	34	30	4	4	234	257	76
x-Stockton Thunder	72	33	29	2	7	235	241	76
x-Victoria Salmon Kings	72	34	32	4	2	230	243	74
e-Ontario Reign	72	31	31	3	7	214	229	72

x - clinched playoff spot, y - clinched division title, b - clinched Brabham Cup, best record in the conference and first round bye, e - eliminated from playoff contention

* – division leader

=== Divisional standings ===
American Conference

East Division	GP	W	L	OTL	SOL	GF	GA	PTS
y-Elmira Jackals (OTT)	72	37	26	6	3	275	231	83
x-Reading Royals (TOR)	72	37	29	1	5	254	275	80
e-Trenton Devils (NJD)	72	33	30	4	5	244	252	75
e-Johnstown Chiefs (MIN)	72	18	43	7	4	215	307	47

North Division	GP	W	L	OTL	SOL	GF	GA	PTS
y-Kalamazoo Wings (PHI/SJ)	72	42	20	6	4	273	243	94
x-Cincinnati Cyclones (MON/NSH)	72	44	25	1	2	235	200	91
x-Toledo Walleye (DET/CHI)	72	35	30	2	5	254	274	77
e-Wheeling Nailers (PIT)	72	33	32	2	5	240	249	73

South Division	GP	W	L	OTL	SOL	GF	GA	PTS
z-Charlotte Checkers (COL/NYR)	72	43	21	4	4	253	223	94
x-South Carolina Stingrays (WSH)	72	41	19	6	6	248	216	94
x-Florida Everblades (CAR/FLA)	72	38	25	4	5	234	221	85
e-Gwinnett Gladiators (ATL/CBJ)	72	31	33	5	3	243	277	70

Note: GP = Games played; W = Wins; L = Losses; T = Ties; OTL = Overtime loss; SOL = Shootout loss; GF = Goals for; GA = Goals against; Pts = Points

National Conference

Pacific Division	GP	W	L	OTL	SOL	GF	GA	PTS
y-Bakersfield Condors (ANA)	72	38	29	4	1	232	243	81
x-Las Vegas Wranglers (PHX)	72	34	30	4	4	234	257	76
x-Stockton Thunder (EDM)	72	33	29	2	7	235	241	76
e-Ontario Reign (LA)	72	31	31	3	7	214	229	72

West Division	GP	W	L	OTL	SOL	GF	GA	PTS
b-Idaho Steelheads (DAL)	72	48	17	2	5	260	191	103
x-Alaska Aces (STL)	72	36	28	4	4	232	240	80
x-Utah Grizzlies (NYI)	72	34	29	4	5	260	253	77
x-Victoria Salmon Kings (VAN)	72	34	32	4	2	230	243	74

Note: GP = Games played; W = Wins; L = Losses; T = Ties; OTL = Overtime loss; SOL = Shootout loss; GF = Goals for; GA = Goals against; Pts = Points

== 2009-10 Kelly Cup Playoffs ==
=== Bracket ===
Conference Quarterfinals	Conference Semifinals
1	Idaho	4
4	Utah	0
4	Utah	3
5	Las Vegas	2
National Conference
2	Bakersfield	3
7	Victoria	2
2	Bakersfield	1
6	Stockton	4
3	Alaska	1
6	Stockton	3
1	Charlotte	3
8	Toledo	1
1	Charlotte	3
5	Cincinnati	4
4	South Carolina	2
5	Cincinnati	3
American Conference
2	Kalamazoo	2
7	Reading	3
7	Reading	4
6	Florida	0
3	Elmira	2
6	Florida	3

Conference Finals
1	Idaho	4
6	Stockton	2
5	Cincinnati	4
7	Reading	3

Kelly Cup Finals
1	Idaho	1
5	Cincinnati	4

== Statistical leaders ==
=== Leading skaters ===
These are the top ten skaters based on points.

GP = Games played; G = Goals; A = Assists; PTS = Points; +/– = Plus–minus; PIM = Penalty minutes; † = Player no longer with listed team

Player	Team	GP	G	A	PTS	+/–	PIM
Tyler Donati	Elmira Jackals	67	38	76	114	+21	52
Justin Donati	Elmira Jackals	65	42	62	104	+13	48
Ryan Kinasewich	Utah Grizzlies	59	48	55	103	-11	70
Mark Derlago	Idaho Steelheads	60	42	50	82	+34	36
Adam Miller	Las Vegas Wranglers	72	33	53	86	+3	102
AJ Perry	Utah Grizzlies	67	30	48	78	-10	62
Evan Barlow	Idaho Steelheads	58	32	43	75	+30	65
James Bates	Stockton Thunder	60	27	46	73	+18	24
Andrew Fournier	Kalamazoo Wings	70	27	44	71	+11	40
Ryan Cruthers	Reading Royals	60	22	49	71	+5	71

Statistics current as of: April 5, 2010

=== Leading goaltenders ===
These are the top five goaltenders based on both goals against average and save percentage with at least one game played (Note: List is sorted by goals against average).

GP = Games played; W = Wins; L = Losses; SA = Shots against; GA = Goals against; GAA = Goals against average; SV% = Save percentage; SO = Shutouts; TOI = Time on ice (in minutes)

Player	Team	GP	W	L	SA	GA	GAA	SV%	SO	TOI
Richard Bachman	Idaho Steelheads	35	22	11	852	77	2.28	.910	4	2028
Jeremy Smith	Cincinnati Cyclones	42	23	17	1074	108	2.28	.899	2	2468
Rejean Beauchemin	Idaho Steelheads	39	25	13	930	100	2.63	.892	2	2279
Ryan Munce	Charlotte Checkers	44	26	17	1139	116	2.77	.913	1	2511
Todd Ford	South Carolina Stingrays	28	18	9	859	77	2.79	.910	1	1658

Statistics current as of: April 5, 2010

== ECHL awards ==
Patrick Kelly Cup:	Cincinnati Cyclones
Henry Brabham Cup:	Idaho Steelheads
Gingher Memorial Trophy:	Cincinnati Cyclones
Bruce Taylor Trophy:	Idaho Steelheads
John Brophy Award:	Derek Laxdal (Idaho Steelheads)
CCM U+ Most Valuable Player:	Tyler Donati (Elmira Jackals)
Kelly Cup Playoffs Most Valuable Player:	Robert Mayer and Jeremy Smith (Cincinnati Cyclones)
Reebok Hockey Goaltender of the Year:	Todd Ford (South Carolina Stingrays)
CCM Rookie of the Year:	Justin Donati (Elmira Jackals)
Defenseman of the Year:	J.C. Sawyer (Toledo Walleye)
Leading Scorer:	Tyler Donati (Elmira Jackals)
Reebok Plus Performer Award:	Mark Derlago (Idaho Steelheads)
Sportsmanship Award:	Barret Ehgoetz (Cincinnati Cyclones)
Birmingham Memorial Award:

=== All-ECHL Teams ===
All-ECHL First Team

(Canada) F Mark Derlago (Idaho Steelheads)
(Canada) F Tyler Donati (Elmira Jackals)
(Canada) F Ryan Kinasewich (Utah Grizzlies)
(Canada) D Eric Regan (Bakersfield Condors)
(Canada) D J.C. Sawyer (Toledo Walleye)
(Canada) G Todd Ford (South Carolina Stingrays)

All-ECHL Second Team

(Canada) F Justin Donati (Elmira Jackals)
(United States) F Adam Miller (Las Vegas Wranglers)
(Canada) F Tyler Spurgeon (Idaho Steelheads)
(United States) D Mitch Ganzak (Wheeling Nailers)
(United States) D Jimmy Sharrow (Victoria Salmon Kings)
(United States) G Richard Bachman (Idaho Steelheads)

=== ECHL All-Rookie Team ===
The selections of two players from the Gwinnett Gladiators and Idaho Steelheads marked the eighth and ninth times that multiple players from the same team had been voted to the All-Rookie Team and the first time since the 2001-02 season.

ECHL-All Rookie Team

(Canada) F Evan Barlow (Idaho)
(Canada) F Justin Donati (Elmira)
(Canada) F Maxime Tanguay (Toledo)
(Canada) D Drew Paris (Gwinnett)
(Canada) D Sam Roberts (Gwinnett)
(United States) G Richard Bachman (Idaho)

== See also ==
- List of ECHL seasons
- 2010 ECHL All-Star Game
- 2009 in sports
- 2010 in sports
