= Todd Ford =

Canadian ice hockey player

- Born: May 1, 1984 (age 42) Calgary, Alberta, Canada
- Height: 6 ft 4 in (193 cm)
- Weight: 176 lb (80 kg; 12 st 8 lb)
- Position: Goaltender
- Caught: Left
- Played for: Heilbronner Falken; Hershey Bears; Portland Pirates; Texas Stars; Toronto Marlies
- NHL draft: 74th overall, 2002; Toronto Maple Leafs
- Playing career: 2004–2012

Todd Ford (born May 1, 1984) is a Canadian former professional ice hockey goaltender. During his career, which lasted from 2004 to 2012, he played in several minor leagues and briefly in the German 2nd Eishockey Bundesliga. He was selected by the Toronto Maple Leafs in the 3rd round (74th overall) of the 2002 NHL entry draft.

== Playing career ==
During the 2010–11 season, Ford was signed to a one-year contract for the remainder of the season with the Washington Capitals on February 25, 2011.

== Awards and honours ==
- ECHL Goaltender of the Year (2009–10)
- ECHL First All-Star Team (2009–10)
