= 2007–08 ECHL season =

Ice hockey league season

- League: ECHL
- Sport: Ice hockey
- Duration: October 2007 – May 2008

Regular season
- Season champions: Cincinnati Cyclones
- Season MVP: David Desharnais (Cincinnati)
- Top scorer: David Desharnais (Cincinnati)

Playoffs
- American champions: Cincinnati Cyclones
- American runners-up: South Carolina Stingrays
- National champions: Las Vegas Wranglers
- National runners-up: Utah Grizzlies
- Playoffs MVP: Cedrick Desjardins

Finals
- Champions: Cincinnati Cyclones
- Runners-up: Las Vegas Wranglers

ECHL seasons
- ← 2006–07 2008–09 →

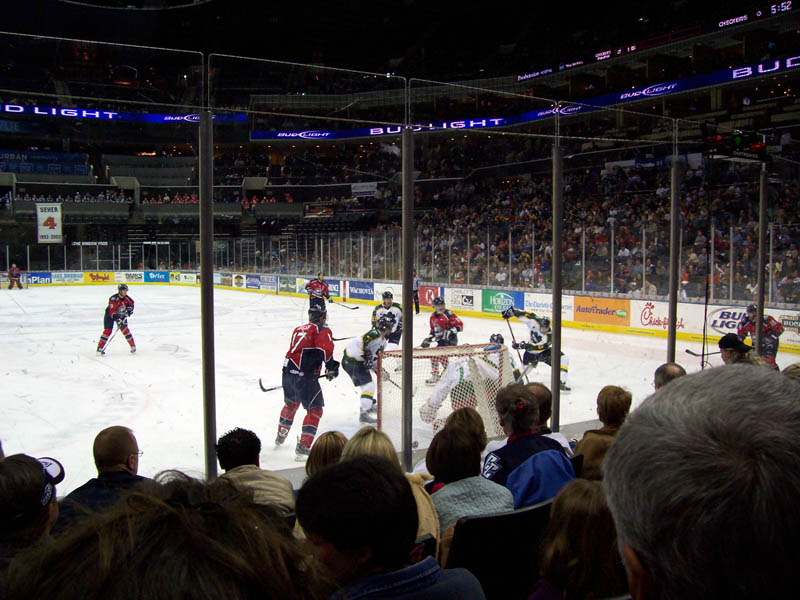

The 2007–08 ECHL season was the 20th season of the ECHL. Two teams suspended operations at the end of the 2006–07 season, the Long Beach Ice Dogs and the Toledo Storm. Toledo's suspension was granted after Toledo Arena Sports, Inc. acquired the Storm and requested a suspension of the team for two years in order to allow a new arena to be built in downtown Toledo to open in 2009 in time for the team to return to play.

The league officially welcomed back the Mississippi Sea Wolves, who had to suspend operations for two seasons (2005–07) because of damage to the Mississippi Coast Coliseum caused by Hurricane Katrina. The Elmira Jackals also joined the ECHL after being in the United Hockey League for their previous existence. Another established team, the Trenton, New Jersey franchise, entered its ninth season with a new name. The team, now owned by the NHL New Jersey Devils, adopted the Devils nickname.

Before the start of the season, the league announced that it would hand out a new award to honor on-ice referees for their dedication and contribution to the league, through the Ryan Birmingham Memorial Award. The award is given in honor of Ryan Birmingham, a former ECHL referee who died in an automobile accident, while driving from Chattanooga, Tennessee to Snellville, Georgia in May 2007. Birmingham died at the age of 24.

The Cincinnati Cyclones finished first overall in the regular season, winning the Brabham Cup, and became the third team in ECHL history to win the Brabham Cup and Kelly Cup in the same year by defeating the Las Vegas Wranglers four games to two.

== League realignment ==
The ECHL announced the alignment of the 25 teams of the ECHL.

=== American Conference ===
==== North Division ====
- Cincinnati Cyclones
- Dayton Bombers
- Elmira Jackals
- Johnstown Chiefs
- Reading Royals
- Trenton Devils
- Wheeling Nailers

==== South Division ====
- Augusta Lynx
- Charlotte Checkers
- Columbia Inferno
- Florida Everblades
- Gwinnett Gladiators
- Mississippi Sea Wolves
- Pensacola Ice Pilots
- South Carolina Stingrays
- Texas Wildcatters

=== National Conference ===
==== Pacific Division ====
- Bakersfield Condors
- Fresno Falcons
- Las Vegas Wranglers
- Stockton Thunder

==== West Division ====
- Alaska Aces
- Idaho Steelheads
- Phoenix RoadRunners
- Utah Grizzlies
- Victoria Salmon Kings

== Playoff format ==
The ECHL realigned the playoff format for the two conferences.

=== National Conference ===
The top eight teams will advance to the playoffs, with the two division champions being the first and second seeds. The other six teams will be seeded by points. Teams will not be re-seeded. All games are best of seven games.

=== American Conference ===
In the North Division, the top five teams will advance to the playoffs, with the division champion being the first seed. The other teams will be seeded by points. The fourth seed and the fifth seed will play a best-of-three series in the Division Quarterfinals. The winner will advance to the best-of-seven Division Semifinals to meet the division leader. The second seed and the third seed will play a best-of-seven Division Semifinals. The winners will advance to the best-of-seven Division Finals. The winner will advance to the American Conference Finals.

In the South Division, the top eight teams will advance to the playoffs, with the division champion being the first seed. The other teams will be seeded by points. Teams will be re-seeded according to the same criteria with division leader seeded first and remaining teams seeded in order of regular-season points. All games are best of five games. The winner of the Division Finals will advance to the American Conference Finals. In the best-of-seven American Conference Finals, the North Division Winner will face the South Division Winner

=== Kelly Cup finals ===
The Kelly Cup finals will be a best-of-seven series between the two conference champions.

== Regular season ==
=== Final standings ===
Note: GP = Games played; W = Wins; L= Losses; OTL = Overtime losses; SOL = Shootout losses; GF = Goals for; GA = Goals against; Pts = Points; Green shade = Clinched playoff spot; Blue shade = Clinched division; (z) = Clinched home-ice advantage

American Conference

Northern Division	GP	W	L	OTL	SOL	Pts	GF	GA
Cincinnati Cyclones (MTL/NSH) (z)	72	55	12	1	4	115	292	178
Elmira Jackals (CBJ)	72	41	24	3	4	89	245	219
Reading Royals (LAK)	72	38	26	6	2	83	247	233
Johnstown Chiefs (COL/BOS)	72	36	30	3	3	78	235	234
Dayton Bombers (Independent)	72	29	31	6	6	70	201	229
Trenton Devils (NJD)	72	29	36	3	4	65	183	220
Wheeling Nailers (PIT/PHI)	72	22	43	3	4	51	186	284

Southern Division	GP	W	L	OTL	SOL	Pts	GF	GA
Texas Wildcatters (MIN)	72	52	9	4	7	115	266	177
South Carolina Stingrays (WSH)	72	47	22	2	1	97	256	192
Gwinnett Gladiators (ATL)	72	44	23	2	3	93	247	198
Florida Everblades (CAR/FLA)	72	39	25	4	4	86	230	198
Columbia Inferno (TOR)	72	33	28	5	6	77	217	227
Charlotte Checkers (NYR)	72	34	31	1	6	75	212	229
Augusta Lynx (ANA)	72	32	35	1	4	69	200	223
Mississippi Sea Wolves (TBL)	72	29	40	1	2	61	204	262
Pensacola Ice Pilots (CHI)	72	19	44	4	5	47	157	263

National Conference

Pacific Division	GP	W	L	OTL	SOL	Pts	GF	GA
Las Vegas Wranglers (CGY) (z)	72	47	13	5	7	106	244	179
Fresno Falcons (Independent)	72	42	22	4	4	92	242	216
Bakersfield Condors (Independent)	72	26	37	2	7	61	230	280
Stockton Thunder (EDM)	72	27	40	3	2	59	200	250

West Division	GP	W	L	OTL	SOL	Pts	GF	GA
Victoria Salmon Kings (VAN)	72	42	23	4	3	91	256	239
Idaho Steelheads (DAL)	72	40	22	5	5	90	224	183
Alaska Aces (STL)	72	41	26	4	1	87	245	229
Utah Grizzlies (NYI)	72	32	30	2	8	74	239	259
Phoenix RoadRunners (SJS)	72	24	39	5	4	57	208	265

Final league standings

=== Scoring leaders ===
Note: GP = Games played; G = Goals; A = Assists; Pts = Points; PIM = Penalty minutes

Player	Team	GP	G	A	Pts	PIM
David Desharnais	Cincinnati Cyclones	68	29	77	106	18
Jeff Campbell	Gwinnett Gladiators	65	26	65	91	42
Travis Morin	South Carolina Stingrays	68	34	50	84	30
Ash Goldie	Victoria Salmon Kings	70	40	43	83	24
Benoit Doucet	Elmira Jackals	71	31	52	83	96
John McNabb	Texas Wildcatters	71	32	50	82	87
Josh Soares	Alaska Aces	61	36	45	81	85
Pierre-Luc Faubert	Elmira Jackals	72	31	45	76	76
Jeff Miles	Columbia Inferno	68	29	47	76	48
Derek Damon	Florida Everblades	51	25	50	75	76

Data referenced from ECHL website

=== Leading goaltenders ===
Note: GP = Games played; TOI = Time on ice (minutes); W = Wins; L = Losses; OTL = Overtime losses; SOL = Shootout losses; GA = Goals against; SO = Shutouts; SV% = Save percentage; GAA = Goals against average

Player	Team	GP	TOI	W	L	OTL	SOL	GA	SO	SV%	GAA
Anton Khudobin	Texas Wildcatters	27	1549	20	1	1	3	51	3	.934	1.98
Kevin Lalande	Las Vegas Wranglers	27	1607	17	5	1	3	55	3	.932	2.05
Davis Parley	South Carolina Stingrays	35	2090	24	9	2	0	80	4	.924	2.30
Craig Kowalski	Gwinnett Gladiators	44	2574	29	11	0	2	100	2	.923	2.33
Kellen Briggs	Idaho Steelheads	31	1802	17	11	0	2	71	3	.920	2.36

Data referenced from ECHL website

== Kelly Cup playoffs ==
Conference 1st Round	Conference Quarterfinals
No.4	Johnstown	2
No.5	Dayton	0
No.1	Cincinnati	4
No.4	Johnstown	0
North Division
No.2	Elmira	2
No.3	Reading	4
American Conference
So.1	Texas	3
So.8	Mississippi	1
So.1	Texas	2
So.5	Columbia	3
So.4	Florida	0
So.5	Columbia	3
South Division
So.3	Gwinnett	3
So.6	Charlotte	0
So.3	Gwinnett	2
So.2	South Carolina	3
So.2	South Carolina	3
So.7	Augusta	2
1	Las Vegas	4
8	Stockton	2
4	Idaho	0
5	Alaska	4
National Conference
3	Fresno	1
6	Utah	4
2	Victoria	4
7	Bakersfield	3

Conference Semifinals
No.1	Cincinnati	4
No.3	Reading	3
So.5	Columbia	2
So.2	South Carolina	3
1	Las Vegas	4
5	Alaska	2
6	Utah	4
2	Victoria	1

Conference Finals
No.1	Cincinnati	4
So.2	South Carolina	1
1	Las Vegas	4
6	Utah	0

Kelly Cup Finals
No.1	Cincinnati	4
Na.1	Las Vegas	2

- No. is short for North Division
- So. is short for South Division
- Na. is short for National Conference

Playoff tables referenced from ECHL website

=== First round ===
*if necessary
Times listed are local.

==== American Conference ====
===== (No. 4) Johnstown Chiefs vs. (No. 5) Dayton Bombers =====
April 6	Dayton Bombers	1 – 3	Johnstown Chiefs	Nutter Center

April 8	Johnstown Chiefs	5 – 0	Dayton Bombers	Cambria County War Memorial Arena

Johnstown wins series 2 – 0

===== (So. 1) Texas Wildcatters vs. (So. 8) Mississippi Sea Wolves =====
April 9	Texas Wildcatters	4 – 1	Mississippi Sea Wolves	Ford Arena

April 10	Texas Wildcatters	5 – 2	Mississippi Sea Wolves	Ford Arena

April 12	Mississippi Sea Wolves	4 – 3	OT	Texas Wildcatters	Mississippi Coast Coliseum

April 13	Mississippi Sea Wolves	3 – 5	Texas Wildcatters	Mississippi Coast Coliseum

Texas wins series 3 – 1

===== (So. 2) South Carolina Stingrays vs. (So. 7) Augusta Lynx =====
April 10	Augusta Lynx	5 – 2	South Carolina Stingrays	James Brown Arena

April 12	Augusta Lynx	4 – 3	OT	South Carolina Stingrays	James Brown Arena

April 14	South Carolina Stingrays	3 – 2	OT	Augusta Lynx	North Charleston Coliseum

April 15	South Carolina Stingrays	3 – 2	2OT	Augusta Lynx	North Charleston Coliseum

April 16	South Carolina Stingrays	3 – 1	Augusta Lynx	North Charleston Coliseum

South Carolina wins series 3 – 2

===== (So. 3) Gwinnett Gladiators vs. (So. 6) Charlotte Checkers =====
April 8	Gwinnett Gladiators	4 – 0	Charlotte Checkers	Arena at Gwinnett Center

April 10	Gwinnett Gladiators	4 – 1	Charlotte Checkers	Arena at Gwinnett Center

April 12	Charlotte Checkers	1 – 2	Gwinnett Gladiators	Time Warner Cable Arena

Gwinnett wins series 3 – 0

===== (So. 4) Florida Everblades vs. (So. 5) Columbia Inferno =====
April 9	Florida Everblades	2 – 3	OT	Columbia Inferno	Germain Arena

April 11	Florida Everblades	1 – 3	Columbia Inferno	Germain Arena

April 12	Columbia Inferno	3 – 2	Florida Everblades	Carolina Coliseum

Columbia wins series 3 – 0

=== Conference quarterfinals ===
==== American Conference ====
===== (No. 1) Cincinnati Cyclones vs. (No. 4) Johnstown Chiefs =====
April 11	Cincinnati Cyclones	5 – 2	Johnstown Chiefs	US Bank Arena

April 12	Cincinnati Cyclones	4 – 1	Johnstown Chiefs	US Bank Arena

April 15	Johnstown Chiefs	2 – 4	Cincinnati Cyclones	Cambria County War Memorial Arena

April 16	Johnstown Chiefs	2 – 3	Cincinnati Cyclones	Cambria County War Memorial Arena

Cincinnati wins series 4 – 0

===== (No. 2) Elmira Jackals vs. (No.3) Reading Royals =====
April 11	Elmira Jackals	1 – 0	Reading Royals	First Arena

April 12	Reading Royals	5 – 4	OT	Elmira Jackals	Sovereign Center

April 15	Elmira Jackals	2 – 3	Reading Royals	First Arena

April 17	Reading Royals	2 – 5	Elmira Jackals	Sovereign Center

April 19	Elmira Jackals	1 – 2	OT	Reading Royals	First Arena

April 20	Reading Royals	5 – 4	2OT	Elmira Jackals	Sovereign Center

Reading wins series 4 – 2

===== (So. 1) Texas Wildcatters vs. (So. 5) Columbia Inferno =====
April 18	Texas Wildcatters	2 – 4	Columbia Inferno	Ford Arena

April 20	Texas Wildcatters	6 – 2	Columbia Inferno	Ford Arena

April 22	Columbia Inferno	0 – 1	OT	Texas Wildcatters	Carolina Coliseum

April 23	Columbia Inferno	2 – 1	OT	Texas Wildcatters	Carolina Coliseum

April 25	Texas Wildcatters	1 – 4	Columbia Inferno	Ford Arena

Columbia wins series 3 – 2

===== (So. 2) South Carolina Stingrays vs. (So. 3) Gwinnett Gladiators =====
April 18	South Carolina Stingrays	5 – 2	Gwinnett Gladiators	North Charleston Coliseum

April 19	South Carolina Stingrays	5 – 4	OT	Gwinnett Gladiators	North Charleston Coliseum

April 21	Gwinnett Gladiators	4 – 1	South Carolina Stingrays	Arena at Gwinnett Center

April 22	Gwinnett Gladiators	3 – 0	South Carolina Stingrays	Arena at Gwinnett Center

April 23	South Carolina Stingrays	2 – 0	Gwinnett Gladiators	North Charleston Coliseum

South Carolina wins series 3 – 2

==== National Conference ====
===== (1) Las Vegas Wranglers vs. (8) Stockton Thunder =====
April 11	Las Vegas Wranglers	2 – 4	Stockton Thunder	Orleans Arena

April 12	Las Vegas Wranglers	5 – 4	OT	Stockton Thunder	Orleans Arena

April 13	Stockton Thunder	2 – 3	Las Vegas Wranglers	Stockton Arena

April 18	Stockton Thunder	3 – 4	OT	Las Vegas Wranglers	Stockton Arena

April 20	Stockton Thunder	6 – 3	Las Vegas Wranglers	Stockton Arena

April 22	Las Vegas Wranglers	4 – 1	Stockton Thunder	Orleans Arena

Las Vegas wins series 4 – 2

===== (2) Victoria Salmon Kings vs. (7) Bakersfield Condors =====
April 10	Victoria Salmon Kings	1 – 2	OT	Bakersfield Condors	Save-On-Foods Memorial Centre

April 12	Victoria Salmon Kings	4 – 3	Bakersfield Condors	Save-On-Foods Memorial Centre

April 15	Bakersfield Condors	2 – 3	OT	Victoria Salmon Kings	Rabobank Arena

April 16	Bakersfield Condors	1 – 4	Victoria Salmon Kings	Rabobank Arena

April 19	Bakersfield Condors	5 – 4	Victoria Salmon Kings	Rabobank Arena

April 22	Victoria Salmon Kings	6 – 5	OT	Bakersfield Condors	Save-On-Foods Memorial Centre

Victoria wins series 4 – 2

===== (3) Fresno Falcons vs. (6) Utah Grizzlies =====
April 13	Fresno Falcons	1 – 6	Utah Grizzlies	Save Mart Center

April 14	Fresno Falcons	3 – 4	3OT	Utah Grizzlies	Save Mart Center

April 16	Utah Grizzlies	0 – 3	Fresno Falcons	E Center

April 18	Utah Grizzlies	1 – 6	Fresno Falcons	E Center

April 19	Utah Grizzlies	1 – 0	OT	Fresno Falcons	E Center

April 21	Fresno Falcons	2 – 4	Utah Grizzlies	Save Mart Center

Utah wins series 4 – 2

===== (4) Idaho Steelheads vs. (5) Alaska Aces =====
April 9	Idaho Steelheads	1 – 4	Alaska Aces	Qwest Arena

April 10	Idaho Steelheads	4 – 6	Alaska Aces	Qwest Arena

April 12	Alaska Aces	3 – 2	2OT	Idaho Steelheads	Sullivan Arena

April 13	Alaska Aces	2 – 1	Idaho Steelheads	Sullivan Arena

Alaska wins series 4 – 0

=== Conference semifinals ===
==== American Conference ====
===== (No. 1) Cincinnati Cyclones vs. (No. 3) Reading Royals =====
April 24	Reading Royals	5 – 3	Cincinnati Cyclones	Sovereign Center

April 26	Reading Royals	2 – 3	Cincinnati Cyclones	Sovereign Center

April 28	Cincinnati Cyclones	2 – 5	Reading Royals	US Bank Arena

April 30	Cincinnati Cyclones	5 – 3	Reading Royals	US Bank Arena

May 1	Cincinnati Cyclones	0 – 1	Reading Royals	US Bank Arena

May 3	Reading Royals	2 – 4	Cincinnati Cyclones	Sovereign Center

May 5	Cincinnati Cyclones	6 – 1	Reading Royals	US Bank Arena

Cincinnati wins series 4 – 3

===== (So. 2) South Carolina Stingrays vs. (So. 5) Columbia Inferno =====
April 27	South Carolina Stingrays	2 – 1	Columbia Inferno	North Charleston Coliseum

April 29	South Carolina Stingrays	5 – 2	Columbia Inferno	North Charleston Coliseum

May 2	Columbia Inferno	5 – 3	South Carolina Stingrays	Carolina Coliseum

May 3	Columbia Inferno	3 – 2	OT	South Carolina Stingrays	Carolina Coliseum

May 6	South Carolina Stingrays	2 – 0	Columbia Inferno	North Charleston Coliseum

South Carolina wins series 3 – 2

==== National Conference ====
===== (1) Las Vegas Wranglers vs. (5) Alaska Aces =====
April 25	Las Vegas Wranglers	8 – 0	Alaska Aces	Orleans Arena

April 26	Las Vegas Wranglers	3 – 1	Alaska Aces	Orleans Arena

April 29	Alaska Aces	2 – 5	Las Vegas Wranglers	Sullivan Arena

May 1	Alaska Aces	6 – 5	OT	Las Vegas Wranglers	Sullivan Arena

May 2	Alaska Aces	3 – 6	Las Vegas Wranglers	Sullivan Arena

Las Vegas wins series 4 – 1

===== (2) Victoria Salmon Kings vs. (6) Utah Grizzlies =====
April 25	Victoria Salmon Kings	0 – 6	Utah Grizzlies	Save-On-Foods Memorial Centre

April 27	Victoria Salmon Kings	6 – 1	Utah Grizzlies	Save-On-Foods Memorial Centre

May 1	Utah Grizzlies	7 – 5	Victoria Salmon Kings	E Center

May 3	Utah Grizzlies	2 – 0	Victoria Salmon Kings	E Center

May 4	Utah Grizzlies	8 – 3	Victoria Salmon Kings	E Center

Utah wins series 4 – 1

=== Conference finals ===
==== American Conference ====
===== (No. 1) Cincinnati Cyclones vs. (So. 2) South Carolina Stingrays =====
May 9	Cincinnati Cyclones	6 – 2	South Carolina Stingrays	US Bank Arena

May 10	Cincinnati Cyclones	5 – 4	OT	South Carolina Stingrays	US Bank Arena

May 14	South Carolina Stingrays	5 – 4	OT	Cincinnati Cyclones	North Charleston Coliseum

May 16	South Carolina Stingrays	1 – 3	Cincinnati Cyclones	North Charleston Coliseum

May 17	South Carolina Stingrays	1 – 2	OT	Cincinnati Cyclones	North Charleston Coliseum

Cincinnati wins series 4 – 1

==== National Conference ====
===== (1) Las Vegas Wranglers vs. (6) Utah Grizzlies =====
May 12	Las Vegas Wranglers	5 – 2	Utah Grizzlies	Orleans Arena

May 13	Las Vegas Wranglers	4 – 3	OT	Utah Grizzlies	Orleans Arena

May 15	Utah Grizzlies	2 – 3	OT	Las Vegas Wranglers	E Center

May 16	Utah Grizzlies	2 – 5	Las Vegas Wranglers	E Center

Las Vegas wins series 4 – 0

=== 2008 Kelly Cup finals ===
==== (No.1) Cincinnati Cyclones vs. (Na.1) Las Vegas Wranglers ====
May 24	Cincinnati Cyclones	4 – 2	Las Vegas Wranglers	US Bank Arena

May 25	Cincinnati Cyclones	0 – 1	Las Vegas Wranglers	US Bank Arena

May 29	Las Vegas Wranglers	2 – 4	Cincinnati Cyclones	Orleans Arena

May 30	Las Vegas Wranglers	2 – 0	Cincinnati Cyclones	Orleans Arena

June 2	Las Vegas Wranglers	0 – 4	Cincinnati Cyclones	Orleans Arena

June 5	Cincinnati Cyclones	3 – 1	Las Vegas Wranglers	US Bank Arena

Cincinnati wins series 4 – 2

== ECHL awards ==
Patrick Kelly Cup:	Cincinnati Cyclones
Henry Brabham Cup:	Cincinnati Cyclones
Gingher Memorial Trophy:	Cincinnati Cyclones
Bruce Taylor Trophy:	Las Vegas Wranglers
John Brophy Award:	Chuck Weber (Cincinnati)
CCM Vector Most Valuable Player:	David Desharnais (Cincinnati)
Kelly Cup Playoffs Most Valuable Player:	Cedrick Deshardains
Reebok Hockey Goaltender of the Year:	Anton Khudobin (Texas)
CCM Tacks Rookie of the Year:	David Desharnais (Cincinnati)
Defenseman of the Year:	Peter Metcalf (Alaska)
Leading Scorer:	David Desharnais (Cincinnati)
Reebok Hockey Plus Performer Award:	Chad Starling (Cincinnati)
Sportsmanship Award:	Jeff Campbell (Gwinnett)
Birmingham Memorial Award:	David Jones

== See also ==
- ECHL All-Star Game
- List of ECHL seasons
- 2007 in ice hockey
- 2008 in ice hockey

Preceded by 2007 Kelly Cup playoffs	Kelly Cup Playoffs; 2008	Succeeded by 2009 Kelly Cup playoffs
