= Stockton Thunder =

Former professional minor league ice hockey team in Stockton, California

- City: Stockton, California
- League: ECHL
- Conference: Western
- Division: Pacific
- Founded: 1990
- Operated: 2005–2015
- Home arena: Stockton Arena
- Colors: Black, gold, silver, white
- Owners: Calgary Sports and Entertainment (N. Murray Edwards, chairman)
- President: Dave Piecuch
- Head coach: Richard Kromm
- Captain: Garet Hunt
- Media: 1280 AM KWSX
- Affiliates: New York Islanders; Edmonton Oilers; San Jose Sharks

Franchise history
- 1990–1992: Cincinnati Cyclones
- 1992–2001: Birmingham Bulls
- 2001–2005: Atlantic City Boardwalk Bullies
- 2005–2015: Stockton Thunder
- 2015–present: Adirondack Thunder

Championships
- Conference titles: 1 (2012–13)

The Stockton Thunder were a minor league professional ice hockey team that was based in Stockton, California, and a member of the ECHL. The Stockton Arena was their home ice, with a capacity of 9,737. The team was an affiliate team of the New York Islanders of the National Hockey League in their final two seasons. The team was purchased by the Calgary Flames and relocated to Glens Falls, New York, as the Flames relocated their American Hockey League team to Stockton to become the Stockton Heat.

== Franchise history ==
=== Cincinnati, Birmingham and Atlantic City ===
The Stockton Thunder were founded as the first incarnation of the Cincinnati Cyclones, an expansion franchise that joined the East Coast Hockey League in 1990. The Cyclones would reach the Riley Cup playoffs in their first two seasons, and the semifinals in the 1991–92 season. Following the 1991–92 season, Cincinnati's owner Doug Kirchhofer was granted an expansion franchise in the International Hockey League and took all Cyclones colors, logos and monikers to be adopted by his future Cincinnati IHL franchise.

The ECHL moved the franchise to Birmingham, Alabama and renamed the Birmingham Bulls, in honor of the former World Hockey Association/Central Hockey League franchise that played in Birmingham from 1976 to 1981. The Bulls played their home games at the Birmingham–Jefferson Convention Complex from 1992 until 2001. The Bulls would make the playoffs five out of their nine seasons in Birmingham, reaching the Riley Cup semifinals during the 1993–94 season.

Following the 2000–01 season, the Birmingham Bulls would move to Atlantic City, New Jersey and become the Atlantic City Boardwalk Bullies. The Boardwalk Bullies would find success quickly in the ECHL, reaching the Conference Finals during the 2002 Kelly Cup playoffs and winning the Northeast Division title the following season. The Boardwalk Bullies would continue their streak through the 2003 Kelly Cup playoffs, winning the Kelly Cup after defeating the Columbia Inferno, 4 games to 1.

Despite winning a division crown and making playoff appearances in all of their four seasons in New Jersey, including the 2003 Kelly Cup championship, the Boardwalk Bullies were unable to maintain a large average attendance. For the 2004–05 season, the Bullies formed a partnership with the New York Islanders of the NHL and Bridgeport Sound Tigers of the American Hockey League. Following that season, they were sold to an ownership group in Stockton, California that moved the team into Stockton Arena which was due to open during the 2005–06 season.

=== Stockton Thunder ===
The Atlantic City Boardwalk Bullies were relocated to Stockton following the 2004–05 season and the franchise was renamed the Stockton Thunder in May 2005 after Thunder beat out Brawlers, Fog, Skate, Spears and Stallions in a name-the-team contest. That same month, former Cyclones forward and coach Chris Cichocki was named the first head coach in Thunder history. Before the 2006–07 season, the Thunder reached an affiliation agreement with the National Hockey League's Edmonton Oilers to be their secondary affiliate after the American Hockey League's Springfield Falcons. Midway through the 2009–10 season, the Thunder would pick up a working partnership agreement with the San Jose Sharks.

In January 2007, the Thunder and Stockton Arena were chosen to host the 2008 ECHL All-Star Game. Three Thunder players, Ryan MacMurchy, Brad Farynuk, and Andy Contois, were selected to the National Conference's All-Star team. The National Conference would win the exhibition, defeating the American Conference 10–7 and Victoria Salmon Kings' forward Ash Goldie was named the game's Most Valuable Player.

The 2008–09 season began with Stockton starting at 10-17-4, fourth in the Pacific Division before the hiring of Matt Thomas as new head coach on December 29. Stockton won seven games in a row and went 7-0-1 in its first eight games under Thomas, eventually clinching a Kelly Cup Playoff berth for the third straight season. The Thunder achieved its first playoff series win in club history, 4-3 in seven games with the Pacific Division champion Ontario Reign.

The series featured five separate one-goal games and Stockton won game seven, 5-4 at Ontario behind Craig Valette's eventual game-winning goal. The Las Vegas Wranglers, the defending Conference champion, eliminated Stockton in another seven-game series, 4-3, in the Conference Semifinal.

Following a start to the 2009–10 season at 5-11-3 and 1-6-3 on their own home ice, the Thunder acquired forwards J.F. Caudron, Matt Robinson, Brett Hemingway and defensemen Anthony Aiello and Justin DaCosta through a series of trades and free-agent signings in December to go 28-19-7 overall and 16-6-4 at Stockton Arena for the remainder of the regular season, at one point moving to a tie for first place in the Pacific Division with the Bakersfield Condors in the final week of the regular season. They made the playoffs for the fourth straight season.

In February 2010, Stockton Hockey Franchise Group, Inc. sold the team to SC Hockey Franchise Corp., headed by Canadian Oil executive Brad Rowbotham and the ECHL Board of Governors unanimously approved the transfer of controlling interest in April, 2010.

Their season ended by advancing to the National Conference Finals for the first time in club history. The Thunder defeated the defending conference champion Alaska Aces, 3-1 in a best-of-five first round series. Stockton then defeated the Pacific Division champion Condors, 4-1 in the best-of-seven Conference Semifinal. The Idaho Steelheads then eliminated Stockton, 4-2 in the Conference Final series.

In August 2010, The Edmonton Oilers announced that the Oklahoma City Barons would be the AHL affiliate of the Thunder for the 2010–11 season. The Thunder and San Jose Sharks also announced an affiliation partnership, aligning the two local teams and giving the Thunder a dual NHL affiliation for the first time in club history. As a result, Stockton had AHL affiliates in both Oklahoma City and Worcester.

In 2012, the Thunder announced an exclusive affiliation with the Edmonton Oilers, choosing not to renew their agreement with the San Jose Sharks.

On July 31, 2013, the Thunder announced a renewed affiliation, for the 2013–14 season, with the New York Islanders and Bridgeport Sound Tigers of the AHL.

On January 30, 2015, the Calgary Flames purchased the Thunder's ECHL franchise rights and relocated the team to Glens Falls, New York to become the Adirondack Thunder. The Adirondack Flames, also owned by the Calgary Flames, relocated from Glens Falls to Stockton to become the Stockton Heat prior to the 2015–16 season.

=== Box office success ===
Since relocating from Atlantic City and taking up residence in the waterfront Stockton Arena venue, the Thunder built a reputation among the strongest fan bases in minor league hockey.

Stockton led the ECHL in attendance for four straight years (from 2005–06 to 2008–09) following the Florida Everblades' five-year run from 2000 to 2005. Stockton drew over an average of 6,000 fans per game or more from 2005 to 2011, and had 14 recorded sellouts at their 9,737-seat home ice venue since 2005.

== Players ==
=== Notable NHL alumni ===
List of Stockton Thunder alumni who played more than 25 games in Stockton and 25 or more games in the National Hockey League.

- Mark Arcobello
- Troy Bodie
- Devan Dubnyk
- Matt Foy
- Jason Morgan
- Liam Reddox
- Tim Sestito
