= Victoria Salmon Kings =

- City: Victoria, British Columbia
- League: ECHL
- Founded: 1988
- Operated: 2004–2011
- Home arena: Save-On-Foods Memorial Centre
- Colors: Navy blue, gold, silver, white
- Owner: Graham Lee
- Affiliates: Independent (2004–2006); Vancouver Canucks (NHL) (2006–2011)

Franchise history
- 1988–1996: Erie Panthers
- 1996–2003: Baton Rouge Kingfish
- 2004–2011: Victoria Salmon Kings

Championships
- Regular season titles: none
- Division titles: 2007–08
- Conference titles: none
- Kelly Cups: none

The Victoria Salmon Kings were a professional ice hockey team based in Victoria, British Columbia, and members of the ECHL. The team debuted in the 2004–05 season and folded after the 2010–11 season. The Chilliwack Bruins of the major junior Western Hockey League relocated to become the Victoria Royals and the two teams could not simultaneously operate. They played at the Save-On-Foods Memorial Centre. For most of their history, they were affiliated with the Vancouver Canucks.

== History ==
Despite its long and distinguished hockey history (the Victoria Cougars won the Stanley Cup in 1925) Victoria was the largest Canadian city without either professional or major junior hockey when the major junior Western Hockey League's Victoria Cougars moved to Prince George in 1994. This left the Tier II Junior 'A' Victoria Salsa (later called the Victoria Grizzlies) as the highest level of hockey in Victoria.

By this time, it had become evident that the 50-year-old Victoria Memorial Arena, seating only 4,000 for hockey, would have to be replaced if Victoria was to attract a new hockey club. After several years of discussion, the construction of a new arena was approved by Victoria voters in a 2002 referendum, with one key condition being that its construction was dependent on Victoria securing a Western Hockey League (WHL) team.

The original logo of the Victoria Salmon Kings lasted for one season. It is rumoured that the logo needed to be changed as the Los Angeles Kings had objected to it.

Salmon Kings shoulder patch logo.

When the private-sector partner, RG Properties, was unable to secure a WHL club, the company bought the franchise rights to the defunct Baton Rouge Kingfish of the minor professional ECHL and announced that Victoria's new team would be named the Salmon Kings to mixed reactions. The acquisition of the franchise meant that construction of the new arena could begin, but many were troubled by the perception that they would be receiving hockey that was inferior to the major junior WHL. In addition, the ECHL was virtually unknown in Canada; Victoria was to be the first Canadian team in league history. The Salmon Kings responded by marketing the team and the league as high quality.

As the 2004–05 ECHL season approached, Victoria's new arena, the Save-on-Foods Memorial Centre, was not going to be ready by the start of the season. In response, the ECHL scheduled the Salmon Kings to begin their inaugural season with a 14-game road trip. This was still not enough time for the arena to be completed, and the Salmon Kings were forced to secure ice time in the Bear Mountain Arena in the suburban community of Colwood, which had been constructed for the junior 'A' Victoria Salsa and the Victoria Shamrocks box lacrosse teams.

Despite the preseason difficulties, the Salmon Kings played their first regular-season game on October 22, 2004, in Bakersfield, California, against the Bakersfield Condors. Former University of Alberta player Ryan Wade scored the first goal in Salmon Kings history in a 7–2 loss. The Salmon Kings would struggle during their 14-game road trip, winning three games while losing 10 games in regulation time and one in a shootout. Their first victory was against the Fresno Falcons on October 24, which the Salmon Kings won 5–0. David Brumby, the Kings' starting goaltender at the time, turned away 37 shots for the shutout.

As the 2004–05 NHL lockout continued, Dale Purinton and Dan Blackburn of the New York Rangers and Mark Smith of the San Jose Sharks played for the Salmon Kings. Purinton, an enforcer, was suspended twice by the league, the first for a career-ending check into the boards of Condors player Krzysztof Wieckowski and the second for returning to the ice to fight after being ejected during a bench-clearing brawl involving the Kings and the Falcons. After the latter suspension, Purinton was suspended indefinitely by the Salmon Kings and did not play again that season.

The Salmon Kings finally played their first home game on December 5, 2004, at Bear Mountain Arena, losing 4–3 in overtime. They finished the regular season with a 15–52–5 record, setting an ECHL record for a continuous winless streak by going 0–18–2 between December 31, 2004 and February 4, 2005.

After another losing season in 2005–06, during which the team had four different coaches behind the bench, the Salmon Kings became the ECHL affiliate of the nearby Vancouver Canucks. The Salmon Kings then had their first winning season in the 2006–07 season. Under head coach, Mark Morrison, the Salmon Kings would finish with a nine-game winning streak for an overall record of 36–32–1–3, good enough for seventh place in the National Conference. They faced the Alaska Aces in their first playoff appearance, winning the opening game by a score of 3–2, but losing the series by four-games-to-two.

The 2007–08 season was the Salmon Kings' best regular season in the ECHL with a 91-point season and winning 42 of 72 games. The Salmon Kings won the West division and took the number two seed into the Kelly Cup playoffs. In the playoffs, the Salmon Kings won their first-ever playoff round by eliminating the Bakersfield Condors in six games. In the second round, the Salmon Kings were eliminated by the Utah Grizzlies in five games.

5th Anniversary emblem worn on their alternate uniforms in 2008–09.

The 2008–09 season started with head coach Mark Morrison adding the general manager's title to his position with the organization. Morrison then promoted Jeff Harris to the team's assistant general manager and hired the newly retired Ryan Wade as the team's assistant coach. The team continued their strong play from the previous season and had a 15-game winning streak between December 8, 2008 and January 10, 2009, then second all-time in ECHL history, and had the team in first place within the division. However, the team went 12–19–0–4 afterwards and dropped to third place, which ensured a Kelly Cup playoff first round match-up again the Idaho Steelheads. In the playoffs, the Salmon Kings swept the series and eliminated the Steelheads in round one in four straight games. In the second round, the Salmon Kings were eliminated from the playoffs by the Alaska Aces in five games. Their lone win was a 4–0 shutout on home ice, their second shutout of the playoffs.

Despite their second straight second round elimination, the 2008–09 season saw a number of team records. Dylan Yeo became the first Salmon King player to win a league award with ECHL Defenseman of the Year. Team captain Wes Goldie set a new team record with 48 goals, while also becoming the first Salmon King to collect 200 points with the team. Finally, the team broke their previous attendance record with an average of 4,923 fans per game, up from 4,871 the previous year and 4,248 in 2006–07.

The following year, general manager and head coach Morrison returned for his third full season as bench boss. The Salmon Kings struggled in their first ten games going 1–9–0–0, placing them in last place of the National Conference standings and caused changes to their roster. However, on November 11, the Salmon Kings went on a 22–6–3–0 run in their next 31 games heading towards the ECHL All-Star break, which made Victoria the hottest team in the ECHL by accumulating the most wins and points through the 67-day stretch. The streak also included a 12-game overall winning streak and tying their previous club record with a 12-game home winning streak. The goaltending in the middle of season would see Glenn Fisher, along with three Abbotsford Heat netminders – David Shantz, Matt Keetley, and Leland Irving rotating starts, while Chad Painchaud, Olivier Latendresse and Wes Goldie led the offensive attack during the stretch run. At the 2010 ECHL All-Star Game, goaltender, David Shantz was named as the starting goaltender for the National Conference, while defenceman and Victoria native, Taylor Ellington joined the roster. After the All-Star break, the Salmon Kings' hot streak would come to an end when the team encountered several injuries and call-ups in the second half of the season. The Salmon Kings would complete the season with a 10–17–0–2 run and barely made the playoffs, finishing with a 34–32–4–2 overall record and placing seventh in the National Conference standings. In the Kelly Cup playoffs, the Salmon Kings played against the Bakersfield Condors in the first round of the best-of-five series. Victoria would win games one and three to take a 2–1 series lead but lost in the fifth-and-deciding game with the game-winning goal coming in the final minute of regulation at Rabobank Arena.

The 2009–10 season produced some highlight moments and individual accomplishments. On January 15, the Salmon Kings played in their 400th game in club history. The next night, the trio of Adam Taylor, Scott Howes, and Dirk Southern combined for a highlight-reel goal vs. Bakersfield at Save-On-Foods Memorial Centre, which became known as "The Goal" and made TSN's Highlight of the Night. In addition, the Salmon Kings also set franchise records such for most goals in a game (9) and fastest two goals (eight seconds apart). On February 11, team captain Wes Goldie passed Ryan Wade's club record for most games played for the Salmon Kings at 266 games. During this season, Chad Painchaud and Jimmy Sharrow broke a five-year-old club record by scoring points in 14 and 12 straight games respectively. Painchaud would tie the franchise record goal scoring streak by scoring goals in five straight games, while veteran Olivier Filion would break the all-time club record with most games registering an assist in seven games. Lastly, Jimmy Sharrow was named as in the ECHL All-Second Team honors at the end of the season.

== Season-by-season record ==
Note: GP = Games played, W = Wins, L = Losses, OTL = Overtime losses, SOL = Shootout losses, Pts = Points, GF = Goals for, GA = Goals against

Regular season										Playoffs				
Season	GP	W	L	OTL	SOL	Pts	GF	GA	Standing	Year	1st round	2nd round	3rd round	Kelly Cup
2004–05	72	15	52	3	2	35	178	298	8th in West	2005	Did not qualify			
2005–06	72	26	37	5	4	61	204	261	5th in West	2006	Did not qualify			
2006–07	72	36	32	1	3	76	239	249	3rd in West	2007	L, 2–4, AK	—	—	—
2007–08	72	42	23	4	3	91	256	239	1st in West	2008	W, 4–2, BAK	L, 1–4, UTA	—	—
2008–09	72	38	27	2	5	83	232	200	3rd in West	2009	W, 4–0, IDH	L, 1–4, AK	—	—
2009–10	72	34	32	4	2	74	230	243	4th in West	2010	L, 2–3, BAK	—	—	—
2010–11	72	32	36	2	2	68	217	234	4th in Mountain	2011	W, 3–1, BAK	W, 4–0, UTA	L, 0–4, AK	—
Team totals	504	223	239	21	21	488	1556	1724	1 Division Title	0 Kelly Cups				

== Franchise records ==
=== Scoring leaders ===
These are the top-ten point-scorers in franchise history.

Note: Pos = Position; GP = Games played; G = Goals; A = Assists; Pts = Points; P/G = Points per game

Player	Pos	GP	G	A	Pts	P/G
Wes Goldie	RW	288	175	88	263	.91
Ryan Wade	RW	265	57	113	170	.64
Milan Gajic	RW	161	59	98	157	.98
Kiel McLeod	C	153	56	67	123	.87
Adam Taylor	RW	206	48	71	119	.58
Chad Painchaud	RW	121	57	60	117	.97
Jordan Krestanovich	LW	124	25	77	102	.80
Olivier Filion	C	132	24	71	95	.71
Chris St. Jacques	C	121	28	65	93	.77
Matt Kelly	D	175	26	67	93	.53

=== Playoff scoring leaders ===
These are the top-ten playoff point-scorers in franchise history.

Note: Pos = Position; GP = Games played; G = Goals; A = Assists; Pts = Points; P/G = Points per game

Player	Pos	GP	G	A	Pts	P/G
Wes Goldie	RW	31	17	17	34	1.09
Milan Gajic	RW	27	7	14	21	.78
Chad Painchaud	RW	17	9	4	13	.76
Kiel McLeod	C	21	7	6	13	.62
Matt Kelly	D	23	1	12	13	.57
Patrick Coulombe	D	26	1	11	12	.46
Rob Hennigar	C	11	0	12	12	1.09
Ryan Wade	RW	22	7	4	11	.50
Chris St. Jacques	C	20	4	7	11	.55
Olivier Filion	C	14	5	5	10	.71

=== Regular season ===
- Most goals in a season: Wes Goldie, 48 (2008–09)
- Most goals in a season by a rookie: Ryan Wade, 19 (2004–05) & Adam Taylor, 19 (2005–06)
- Most assists in a season: Rob Hennigar, 54 (2010–11)
- Most assists in a season by a rookie: Adam Taylor, 38 (2005–06)
- Most points in a season: Ash Goldie, 83 (40g, 43a) (2007–08)
- Most points in a season by a rookie: Adam Taylor, 57 (19g, 38a) (2005–06)
- Most penalty minutes in a season: Blue Bennefield, 195 (2004–05)
- Most goals in a season by a defenseman: Steve Lingren, 22 (2005–06)
- Most assists in a season by a defenseman: Gary Gladue, 37 (2007–08)
- Most points in a season by a defenseman: Steve Lingren, 47 (22g, 25a) (2005–06)
- Most wins in a season: David Shantz, 25 (2010–11)
- Most shutouts in a season: Todd Ford, 4 (2008–09)
- Lowest goals against avg-(minimum 1000 minutes): Todd Ford, 2.64 (2008–09)
- Highest save percentage-(minimum 1000 minutes): Todd Ford & Julien Ellis, 0.915 (2008–09)

=== Playoffs ===
- Most goals in a playoff season: Wes Goldie, 6 (2006–07)
- Most goals by a defenseman in a playoff season: Dylan Yeo, 4 (2007–08) & Jeff Caister, 4 (2010–11)
- Most assists in a playoff season: Rob Hennigar, 12 (2010–11)
- Most points in a playoff season: Wes Goldie, 13 (5g, 8a) (2007–08)
- Most points by a defenseman in a playoff season: Jeff Caister, 8 (4g, 4a) (2010–11)
- Most penalty minutes in a playoff season: Olivier Labelle, 32 (2008–09)
- Most wins in a playoff season: David Shantz, 7 (2010–11)
- Lowest goals against avg.: David Shantz, 2.41 (2010–11)

=== Team ===
- Longest winning streak, one season: 15 (December 8, 2008 – January 10, 2009) (second all-time in ECHL history)
- Longest winless streak, one season: 20 (December 31, 2004 – February 4, 2005) (also the ECHL record)
- Longest home winning streak, one season: 12 (December 9, 2008 - January 27, 2009) (November 14, 2009 - January 9, 2010)
- Longest home winless streak, one season: 12 (December 31, 2004 – February 4, 2005) (also the ECHL record)
- Most penalty minutes, both teams, one game: 306 (Victoria Salmon Kings (171) vs. Fresno Falcons (135), February 16, 2005) (also the ECHL record)

== Leaders ==
=== Team captains ===
- Brad Dexter, 2004–05
- Ryan Wade, 2005–06
- Kiel McLeod, 2006–08
- Jordan Krestanovich, 2008
- Wes Goldie, 2008–2010
- Pete Vandermeer, 2010–2011

=== Head coaches ===
- Bryan Maxwell, 2004–06
- Troy Ward, 2006
- Tony MacAulay, 2006
- Mark Morrison, 2006–11

== See also ==
- List of ice hockey teams in British Columbia
