= 2016–17 EIHL season =

- League: Elite Ice Hockey League
- Sport: Ice hockey
- Duration: September - March
- Number of matches: 260
- Total attendance: 746,816
- Average attendance: 2,872

Regular season
- League: Cardiff Devils
- Season MVP: Andrew Hotham (Cardiff Devils)
- Top scorer: Matt Beca (Braehead Clan); 75 points

Challenge Cup
- Champions: Cardiff Devils

Conference
- Erhardt champions: Cardiff Devils
- Erhardt runners-up: Belfast Giants
- Gardiner champions: Braehead Clan
- Gardiner runners-up: Dundee Stars

Playoffs
- Champions: Sheffield Steelers
- Runners-up: Cardiff Devils
- Finals MVP: Ben Bowns (Cardiff Devils)

EIHL seasons
- ← 2015–16 2017–18 →

The 2016–17 Elite Ice Hockey League season was the 14th season of the Elite Ice Hockey League. The regular season begun in early September and ended in March. Regular season champion Cardiff Devils were defeated in the playoff final by their Erhardt Conference rivals Sheffield Steelers 6–5 in double-overtime.

From the 2016–17 season, the number of non British-trained players rose from 13 to 14, while the number of work-permit players remained at 11, according to a rule change first introduced in 2014.

== Teams ==
Erhardt Conference

Team	City/Town	Arena	Capacity
Belfast Giants	Belfast	SSE Arena Belfast	7,200
Cardiff Devils	(Wales) Cardiff	Ice Arena Wales	3,088
Coventry Blaze	(England) Coventry	SkyDome Arena	3,000
Nottingham Panthers	(England) Nottingham	National Ice Centre	7,500
Sheffield Steelers	(England) Sheffield	Motorpoint Arena	8,500

Gardiner Conference

Team	City/Town	Arena	Capacity
Braehead Clan	(Scotland) Glasgow	Braehead Arena	4,000
Dundee Stars	(Scotland) Dundee	Dundee Ice Arena	2,400
Edinburgh Capitals	(Scotland) Edinburgh	Murrayfield Ice Rink	3,700
Fife Flyers	(Scotland) Kirkcaldy	Fife Ice Arena	3,525
Manchester Storm	(England) Altrincham	Altrincham Ice Dome	2,000

== Standings ==
=== Overall ===
All games counted towards the overall Elite League standings. Each team played 52 matches; 32 matches against their four Conference rivals, and 20 against the five teams from the other Conference. The Cardiff Devils became regular season champions for the first time in twenty years, with a 6–2 win over the Sheffield Steelers on 18 March 2017 at Ice Arena Wales.

Pos	Team	Pld	W	L	OTL	RW	GF	GA	GD	Pts	Qualification
1	Cardiff Devils (Q)	52	39	10	3	32	200	136	+64	81	Regular season champions Qualification to playoffs
2	Belfast Giants (Q)	52	35	13	4	30	195	145	+50	74	Qualification to playoffs
3	Sheffield Steelers (Q)	52	35	14	3	31	196	136	+60	73	Qualification to playoffs
4	Nottingham Panthers (Q)	52	26	20	6	22	169	175	−6	58	Qualification to playoffs
5	Braehead Clan (Q)	52	27	22	3	24	191	176	+15	57	Qualification to playoffs
6	Fife Flyers (Q)	52	25	24	3	20	174	186	−12	53	Qualification to playoffs
7	Dundee Stars (Q)	52	20	26	6	16	162	183	−21	46	Qualification to playoffs
8	Manchester Storm (Q)	52	18	26	8	17	141	168	−27	44	Qualification to playoffs
9	Coventry Blaze	52	19	28	5	13	147	198	−51	43	
10	Edinburgh Capitals	52	16	33	3	11	154	226	−72	35	

Source: EIHL
Rules for classification: 1) Points; 2) Games won in regulation time; 3) Number of games won; 4) Head-to-head results, ranked by criteria 1 to 3; 5) Fewest regulation losses; 6) Away game results, ranked by criteria 1 to 3; 7) Goals scored; 8) Drawing of lots.

=== Erhardt Conference ===
Only intra-conference games counted towards the Erhardt Conference standings. Each team played the other four teams in the Conference eight times, for a total of 32 matches. The Cardiff Devils won the Conference for the second successive season, with a 4–3 win over the Belfast Giants on 25 March 2017 at Ice Arena Wales.

Pos	Team	Pld	W	L	OTL	RW	GF	GA	GD	Pts	Qualification
1	Cardiff Devils	32	21	8	3	18	119	96	+23	45	Conference champions
2	Belfast Giants	32	20	10	2	16	104	88	+16	42	
3	Sheffield Steelers	32	18	12	2	17	121	88	+33	38	
4	Nottingham Panthers	32	13	15	4	11	104	119	−15	30	
5	Coventry Blaze	32	8	21	3	4	84	141	−57	19	

Source: EIHL
Rules for classification: 1) Points; 2) Games won in regulation time; 3) Number of games won; 4) Head-to-head results, ranked by criteria 1 to 3; 5) Fewest regulation losses; 6) Away game results, ranked by criteria 1 to 3; 7) Goals scored; 8) Drawing of lots.

=== Gardiner Conference ===
Only intra-conference games counted towards the Gardiner Conference standings. Each team played the other four teams in the Conference eight times, for a total of 32 matches. The Braehead Clan won the Conference for the third successive season, with a 4–1 win over the Dundee Stars on 25 February 2017 at the Braehead Arena.

Pos	Team	Pld	W	L	OTL	RW	GF	GA	GD	Pts	Qualification
1	Braehead Clan	32	23	8	1	22	136	97	+39	47	Conference champions
2	Dundee Stars	32	17	12	3	14	117	106	+11	37	
3	Fife Flyers	32	14	15	3	13	117	121	−4	31	
4	Manchester Storm	32	13	16	3	12	93	101	−8	29	
5	Edinburgh Capitals	32	13	18	1	8	101	139	−38	27	

Source: EIHL
Rules for classification: 1) Points; 2) Games won in regulation time; 3) Number of games won; 4) Head-to-head results, ranked by criteria 1 to 3; 5) Fewest regulation losses; 6) Away game results, ranked by criteria 1 to 3; 7) Goals scored; 8) Drawing of lots.

== Playoffs ==
=== Bracket ===
Quarter-finals (1–2 April)
E1	Cardiff Devils	3	3	6
RS8	Manchester Storm	2	1	3
G1	Braehead Clan	1	0	1
RS7	Dundee Stars	3	3	6
(Pairings are reseeded after the first round)
RS3	Sheffield Steelers	2	5	7
RS4	Nottingham Panthers	5	1	6
RS2	Belfast Giants	4	4	8
RS6	Fife Flyers	2	1	3

Semi-finals (8 April)
E1	Cardiff Devils	4
RS7	Dundee Stars	2
RS3	Sheffield Steelers	2
RS2	Belfast Giants	0

Grand Final (9 April)
E1	Cardiff Devils	5
RS3	Sheffield Steelers	6
Third place game (9 April)
RS7	Dundee Stars	8
RS2	Belfast Giants	15

=== Quarter-finals ===
==== (E1) Cardiff Devils vs. (RS8) Manchester Storm ====
1 April 2017	Cardiff Devils	3–2	Manchester Storm	Ice Arena Wales; Attendance: 3,088	Recap
Patrick Asselin (PPG) – 15:20		First period	No scoring
No scoring		Second period	7:19 – Connor Varley (SHG); 13:23 – Mark Heatley
Joey Haddad – 4:02; Scott Hotham – 10:46		Third period	No scoring
Ben Bowns (22 shots / 20 saves)		Goalie stats	Mike Clemente (38 shots / 35 saves)

2 April 2017	Manchester Storm	1–3	Cardiff Devils	Altrincham Ice Dome; Attendance: 1,598	Recap
Darian Dziurzynski – 8:21		First period	11:37 – Joey Haddad; 18:33 – Chris Culligan
No scoring		Second period	8:07 – Gleason Fournier
No scoring		Third period	No scoring
Mike Clemente (38 shots / 35 saves)		Goalie stats	Ben Bowns (23 shots / 22 saves)

Cardiff Devils win 6–3 on aggregate.

==== (G1) Braehead Clan vs. (RS7) Dundee Stars ====
1 April 2017	Dundee Stars	3–1	Braehead Clan	Dundee Ice Arena; Attendance: 1,400	Recap
Justin Faryna – 7:33		First period	No scoring
Justin Faryna (2; PPG) – 19:21		Second period	3:51 – Alex Leavitt
Vinny Scarsella – 8:17		Third period	No scoring
Joe Fallon (26 shots / 25 saves)		Goalie stats	Michal Zajkowski (39 shots / 36 saves)

2 April 2017	Braehead Clan	0–3	Dundee Stars	Braehead Arena; Attendance: 3,525	Recap
No scoring		First period	No scoring
No scoring		Second period	11:54 – Cale Tanaka
No scoring		Third period	3:10 – Joey Sides; 6:17 – Kevin Hart
Michal Zajkowski (31 shots / 28 saves)		Goalie stats	Joe Fallon (27 shots / 27 saves)

Dundee Stars win 6–1 on aggregate.

==== (RS3) Sheffield Steelers vs. (RS4) Nottingham Panthers ====
1 April 2017	Nottingham Panthers	5–2	Sheffield Steelers	National Ice Centre; Attendance: 5,840	Recap
Alex Nikiforuk – 4:55; Robert Farmer (PPG) – 8:54; Brad Moran (PPG) – 11:04; Brian McGrattan – 11:52		First period	No scoring
No scoring		Second period	4:45 – Levi Nelson (PPG)
Chris Lawrence – 19:50		Third period	14:45 – Geoff Walker (PPG)
Miika Wiikman (35 shots / 33 saves)		Goalie stats	Ervīns Muštukovs (21 shots / 16 saves)

2 April 2017	Sheffield Steelers	5–1	OT	Nottingham Panthers	Sheffield Arena; Attendance: 7,168	Recap
Levi Nelson – 18:33		First period		No scoring
Jonathan Phillips (SHG) – 17:30		Second period		No scoring
Markus Nilsson – 7:33; Robert Dowd (PPG) – 15:23		Third period		19:52 – Chris Lawrence
Guillaume Desbiens – 1:39		First overtime period		No scoring
Ervīns Muštukovs (19 shots / 18 saves)		Goalie stats		Miika Wiikman (15 shots / 14 saves); Dan Green (12 shots / 8 saves)

Sheffield Steelers win 7–6 on aggregate.

==== (RS2) Belfast Giants vs. (RS6) Fife Flyers ====
1 April 2017	Belfast Giants	4–2	Fife Flyers	SSE Arena; Attendance: 5,589	Recap
No scoring		First period	15:49 – Sébastien Thinel
Steve Saviano (PPG) – 10:15; Chris Higgins – 11:03; Derrick Walser (PPG) – 16:16		Second period	No scoring
Derrick Walser (2; PPG) – 18:16		Third period	4:23 – Chase Schaber
Stephen Murphy (30 shots / 28 saves)		Goalie stats	Shane Owen (46 shots / 42 saves)

2 April 2017	Fife Flyers	1–4	Belfast Giants	Fife Ice Arena; Attendance: 2,138	Recap
No scoring		First period	11:05 – Matt Nickerson
Ryan Dingle – 3:50		Second period	15:55 – Jérôme Gauthier-Leduc (PPG); 19:45 – Chris Higgins (PPG)
No scoring		Third period	4:06 – Blair Riley
Shane Owen (33 shots / 29 saves)		Goalie stats	Stephen Murphy (21 shots / 20 saves)

Belfast Giants win 8–3 on aggregate.

=== Semi-finals ===
8 April 2017; 13:00	Cardiff Devils	4–2 (0–2, 1–0, 3–0)	Dundee Stars	National Ice Centre, Nottingham; Attendance: 7,250

Game reference

Ben Bowns
Goalies
Joe Fallon
Referees:
Stefan Hogarth
Dean Smith
Linesmen:
Paul Staniforth
James Kavanagh

	0–1	12:29 – Kevin Hart
	0–2	18:13 – Brett Switzer
Joey Haddad – 26:57	1–2
Mark Louis – 43:40	2–2
Joey Martin – 51:27	3–2
Andrew Hotham (ENG) – 59:50	4–2

2 min
Penalties
2 min
37
Shots
26

8 April 2017; 17:00	Sheffield Steelers	2–0 (1–0, 0–0, 1–0)	Belfast Giants	National Ice Centre, Nottingham; Attendance: 7,250

Game reference
Ervīns Muštukovs	Goalies	Stephen Murphy	Referees: Toby Craig; Tom Pering; Linesmen: Lee Young; Allan Ward
Guillaume Desbiens – 4:15 / 1–0; Levi Nelson (PPG, ENG) – 59:35 / 2–0			Referees: Toby Craig; Tom Pering; Linesmen: Lee Young; Allan Ward
2 min	Penalties	6 min	Referees: Toby Craig; Tom Pering; Linesmen: Lee Young; Allan Ward
17	Shots	31	Referees: Toby Craig; Tom Pering; Linesmen: Lee Young; Allan Ward

=== Third-place match ===
9 April 2017; 12:00	Dundee Stars	8–15 (4–4, 2–5, 2–6)	Belfast Giants	National Ice Centre, Nottingham; Attendance: 7,250

Game reference

Craig Holland (57:49)
Joe Fallon (2:11)
Goalies
Andrew Dickson
Referees:
Stefan Hogarth
Pavel Halas
Linesmen:
Danny Beresford
Lee Young

Vinny Scarsella – 5:51	1–0
	1–1	7:27 – Blair Riley
Mikael Lidhammar – 7:36	2–1
	2–2	9:15 – David Rutherford
Craig Moore – 11:27	3–2
	3–3	12:53 – Ryan Martinelli
	3–4	13:57 – Colin Shields
Kevin Bruijsten – 17:48	4–4
Matt White – 22:21	5–4
	5–5	22:31 – Matt Towe
	5–6	23:11 – David Rutherford (2)
	5–7	28:26 – David Rutherford (3)
	5–8	35:34 – Chris Higgins
Joey Sides – 36:50	6–8
	6–9	37:08 – Michael Quesnele
Justin Faryna – 41:31	7–9
	7–10	42:58 – Jim Vandermeer
	7–11	50:46 – Michael Forney
	7–12	52:27 – Ryan Martinelli (2)
	7–13	52:52 – Colin Shields (2)
	7–14	55:16 – Michael Forney (2)
	7–15	58:47 – Adam Keefe
Justin Faryna (2) – 59:46	8–15

0 min
Penalties
0 min
38
Shots
43

=== Grand Final ===
9 April 2017; 16:00	Sheffield Steelers	6–5 (2OT) (1–3, 4–1, 0–1, 0–0, 1–0)	Cardiff Devils	National Ice Centre, Nottingham; Attendance: 7,250

Game reference

Ervīns Muštukovs
Goalies
Ben Bowns
Referees:
Toby Craig
Dean Smith
Linesmen:
Allan Ward
James Kavanagh

	0–1	2:20 – Guillaume Doucet (PPG)
John Armstrong – 3:52	1–1
	1–2	16:10 – Joey Haddad
	1–3	19:17 – Joey Martin (PPG)
Geoff Walker – 24:24	2–3
Colton Fretter – 25:54	3–3
Levi Nelson (PPG) – 28:45	4–3
	4–4	32:20 – Layne Ulmer
Geoff Walker (2) – 37:23	5–4
	5–5	40:54 – Andrew Hotham (PPG)
Levi Nelson (2) – 94:08	6–5

10 min
Penalties
6 min
61
Shots
44

== Challenge Cup ==
The Challenge Cup was won by the Cardiff Devils, who came from behind to beat the Sheffield Steelers 3-2.

The win meant Cardiff had won the Challenge Cup twice in the previous three years, with their other victory coming in 2014-15, also against the Steelers.

== Statistics ==
=== Scoring leaders ===
The following players led the league in points at the conclusion of the regular season.

Player	Team	GP	G	A	Pts	PIM
Matt Beca	Braehead Clan	52	27	48	75	28
Scott Pitt	Braehead Clan	52	32	42	74	26
Vinny Scarsella	Dundee Stars	52	18	54	72	4
Alex Leavitt	Braehead Clan	52	24	45	69	57
Mathieu Roy	Sheffield Steelers	52	28	29	57	28
Blair Riley	Belfast Giants	52	28	28	56	77
Chris Higgins	Belfast Giants	49	20	35	55	107
Mathew Sisca	Fife Flyers	50	17	38	55	44
Ryan Dingle	Fife Flyers	41	31	23	54	32
Kevin Bruijsten	Dundee Stars	47	23	31	54	10

=== Leading goaltenders ===
The following goaltenders led the league in goals against average, playing at least 2100 minutes, at the conclusion of the regular season.

Player	Team	GP	TOI	W	L	GA	SO	SV%	GAA
Ben Bowns	Cardiff Devils	46	2616:43	33	7	103	3	.912	2.36
Ervīns Muštukovs	Sheffield Steelers	51	3053:14	34	14	130	1	.913	2.55
Stephen Murphy	Belfast Giants	39	2284:16	25	10	97	3	.905	2.55
Mike Clemente	Manchester Storm	52	3108:38	18	26	150	3	.910	2.90
Miika Wiikman	Nottingham Panthers	41	2294:47	23	12	115	2	.901	3.01
