= 2017–18 EIHL season =

- League: Elite Ice Hockey League
- Sport: Ice hockey
- Duration: 9 September 2017 – 25 March 2018
- Matches: 336
- Total attendance: 904,161
- Average attendance: 2,690

Regular season
- League: Cardiff Devils
- Season MVP: Joey Martin (Cardiff Devils)
- Top scorer: Mike Hammond (Manchester Storm) (83 points)

Challenge Cup
- Winners: Belfast Giants

Conference
- Erhardt champions: Cardiff Devils
- Gardiner champions: Fife Flyers
- Patton champions: Manchester Storm

Playoffs
- Champions: Cardiff Devils
- Runners-up: Sheffield Steelers
- Finals MVP: Justin Faryna (Cardiff Devils)

EIHL seasons
- 2016–17 2018–19

The 2017–18 EIHL season was the 15th season of the Elite Ice Hockey League. The regular season commenced on 9 September 2017 and ended on 25 March 2018. The reigning league champions were the Cardiff Devils, who won the championship for the first time in 2016–17. The Devils retained their regular season title, with a 3–2 victory away at the Belfast Giants on 16 March 2018. The Devils also won the playoff title, beating the Sheffield Steelers – who had defeated the Devils 12 months prior in a 6–5 double overtime game – 3–1 in the final, winning a first playoff title since 1998–99.

== Teams ==
The league expanded from ten teams to twelve teams for the 2017–18 season, with the introduction of two former English Premier Ice Hockey League teams; the Guildford Flames and the Milton Keynes Lightning.

Starting from the 2017–18 season, the league featured three conferences of four teams compared to the previous season's two conferences of five teams. The Gardiner Conference became an all-Scottish division, with the Braehead Clan, the Dundee Stars, the Edinburgh Capitals and the Fife Flyers. The Manchester Storm, who were part of the Gardiner Conference in 2016–17, moved to a new Southern conference: the Patton Conference. Also part of the division were the Coventry Blaze (moving from the Erhardt Conference), the Guildford Flames and the Milton Keynes Lightning. The final conference was the Erhardt Conference, consisting of the four "Arena" teams: the Belfast Giants, the Cardiff Devils, the Nottingham Panthers and the Sheffield Steelers.

Team	City/Town	Conference	Arena	Capacity
Belfast Giants	Belfast	Erhardt	SSE Arena Belfast	7,200
Braehead Clan	(Scotland) Glasgow	Gardiner	Braehead Arena	4,000
Cardiff Devils	(Wales) Cardiff	Erhardt	Ice Arena Wales	3,095
Coventry Blaze	(England) Coventry	Patton	SkyDome Arena	3,000
Dundee Stars	(Scotland) Dundee	Gardiner	Dundee Ice Arena	2,400
Edinburgh Capitals	(Scotland) Edinburgh	Gardiner	Murrayfield Ice Rink	3,700
Fife Flyers	(Scotland) Kirkcaldy	Gardiner	Fife Ice Arena	3,525
Guildford Flames	(England) Guildford	Patton	Guildford Spectrum	2,001
Manchester Storm	(England) Altrincham	Patton	Altrincham Ice Dome	2,000
Milton Keynes Lightning	(England) Milton Keynes	Patton	Planet Ice Milton Keynes	2,800
Nottingham Panthers	(England) Nottingham	Erhardt	National Ice Centre	7,500
Sheffield Steelers	(England) Sheffield	Erhardt	Motorpoint Arena	9,000

== Standings ==
=== Overall ===
All games counted towards the overall Elite League standings. Each team played 56 matches; 24 matches against their three Conference rivals, and 32 against the eight teams from the other Conferences. The Cardiff Devils became regular season champions for the second successive season, with a 3–2 win over the Belfast Giants on 16 March 2018 at SSE Arena Belfast.

Pos	Team	Pld	W	L	OTL	RW	GF	GA	GD	Pts	Qualification
1	Cardiff Devils (Q)	56	41	12	3	37	234	149	+85	85	Regular season champions Qualification to playoffs
2	Manchester Storm (Q)	56	35	16	5	28	216	169	+47	75	Qualification to playoffs
3	Sheffield Steelers (Q)	56	34	19	3	32	217	140	+77	71	Qualification to playoffs
4	Nottingham Panthers (Q)	56	33	18	5	25	203	177	+26	71	Qualification to playoffs
5	Belfast Giants (Q)	56	34	20	2	30	227	200	+27	70	Qualification to playoffs
6	Guildford Flames (Q)	56	30	17	9	27	215	173	+42	69	Qualification to playoffs
7	Fife Flyers (Q)	56	33	21	2	27	218	172	+46	68	Qualification to playoffs
8	Coventry Blaze (Q)	56	25	26	5	22	189	186	+3	55	Qualification to playoffs
9	Braehead Clan	56	24	26	6	24	161	186	−25	54	
10	Dundee Stars	56	22	30	4	16	167	233	−66	48	
11	Milton Keynes Lightning	56	20	34	2	16	180	229	−49	42	
12	Edinburgh Capitals	56	5	50	1	5	118	331	−213	11	

Source: EIHL
Rules for classification: 1) Points; 2) Games won in regulation time; 3) Number of games won; 4) Head-to-head results, ranked by criteria 1 to 3; 5) Fewest regulation losses; 6) Away game results, ranked by criteria 1 to 3; 7) Goals scored; 8) Drawing of lots.

=== Erhardt Conference ===
Only intra-conference games counted towards the Erhardt Conference standings. Each team played the other three teams in the Conference eight times, for a total of 24 matches. The Cardiff Devils won the Conference for the third season in a row, with a 3–2 win over the Belfast Giants on 16 March 2018 at SSE Arena Belfast.

Pos	Team	Pld	W	L	OTL	RW	GF	GA	GD	Pts	Qualification
1	Cardiff Devils	24	15	7	2	13	91	71	+20	32	Conference champions
2	Belfast Giants	24	13	9	2	11	77	83	−6	28	
3	Sheffield Steelers	24	10	12	2	10	68	63	+5	22	
4	Nottingham Panthers	24	10	14	0	8	78	97	−19	20	

Source: EIHL
Rules for classification: 1) Points; 2) Games won in regulation time; 3) Number of games won; 4) Head-to-head results, ranked by criteria 1 to 3; 5) Fewest regulation losses; 6) Away game results, ranked by criteria 1 to 3; 7) Goals scored; 8) Drawing of lots.

=== Gardiner Conference ===
Only intra-conference games counted towards the Gardiner Conference standings. Each team played the other three teams in the Conference eight times, for a total of 24 matches. The Fife Flyers won the Conference for the first time, with a 7–6 overtime win over the Dundee Stars on 18 February 2018 at the Dundee Ice Arena.

Pos	Team	Pld	W	L	OTL	RW	GF	GA	GD	Pts	Qualification
1	Fife Flyers	24	19	3	2	17	123	57	+66	40	Conference champions
2	Braehead Clan	24	14	8	2	14	85	72	+13	30	
3	Dundee Stars	24	13	10	1	9	86	96	−10	27	
4	Edinburgh Capitals	24	2	21	1	2	59	128	−69	5	

Source: EIHL
Rules for classification: 1) Points; 2) Games won in regulation time; 3) Number of games won; 4) Head-to-head results, ranked by criteria 1 to 3; 5) Fewest regulation losses; 6) Away game results, ranked by criteria 1 to 3; 7) Goals scored; 8) Drawing of lots.

=== Patton Conference ===
Only intra-conference games counted towards the Patton Conference standings. Each team played the other three teams in the Conference eight times, for a total of 24 matches. The Manchester Storm won the inaugural Conference, after the Coventry Blaze defeated the Storm's closest challengers, the Guildford Flames, 3–1 on 18 March 2018 at the Guildford Spectrum.

Pos	Team	Pld	W	L	OTL	RW	GF	GA	GD	Pts	Qualification
1	Manchester Storm	24	15	8	1	13	91	71	+20	31	Conference champions
2	Guildford Flames	24	13	6	5	12	91	75	+16	31	
3	Coventry Blaze	24	12	11	1	11	87	91	−4	25	
4	Milton Keynes Lightning	24	8	15	1	4	70	102	−32	17	

Source: EIHL
Rules for classification: 1) Points; 2) Games won in regulation time; 3) Number of games won; 4) Head-to-head results, ranked by criteria 1 to 3; 5) Fewest regulation losses; 6) Away game results, ranked by criteria 1 to 3; 7) Goals scored; 8) Drawing of lots.

== Playoffs ==
=== Bracket ===
Quarter-finals (30 March – 1 April)
1	Cardiff Devils	4	4	8
8	Coventry Blaze	2	3	5
2	Manchester Storm	4	1	5
7	Fife Flyers	1	5	6
(Pairings are reseeded after the first round)
3	Sheffield Steelers	5	4	9
6	Guildford Flames	2	5	7
4	Nottingham Panthers	3	5	8
5	Belfast Giants	4	3	7

Semi-finals (7 April)
1	Cardiff Devils	4
7	Fife Flyers	0
3	Sheffield Steelers	5
4	Nottingham Panthers	4

Grand Final (8 April)
1	Cardiff Devils	3
3	Sheffield Steelers	1
Third place game (8 April)
4	Nottingham Panthers	8
7	Fife Flyers	2

=== Quarter-finals ===
==== (1) Cardiff Devils vs. (8) Coventry Blaze ====
30 March 2018	Coventry Blaze	2–4	Cardiff Devils	SkyDome Arena; Attendance: 2,528	Recap
Ben Lake (PPG) – 1:18		First period	No scoring
Danick Paquette – 4:43		Second period	2:30 – Joey Haddad; 10:56 – Sean Bentivoglio (PPG)
No scoring		Third period	3:00 – Joey Martin (PPG); 9:32 – Matt Pope
Kevin Nastiuk (35 shots / 31 saves)		Goalie stats	Ben Bowns (32 shots / 30 saves)

1 April 2018	Cardiff Devils	4–3	Coventry Blaze	Ice Arena Wales; Attendance: 3,095	Recap
Justin Faryna – 18:24		First period	0:34 – Ryan Dingle
No scoring		Second period	4:18 – Brett Robinson (PPG); 17:42 – Ross Venus
Josh Batch – 2:47; Matt Pope – 3:26; Justin Faryna (2; ENG) – 18:03		Third period	No scoring
Ben Bowns (15 shots / 12 saves)		Goalie stats	Kevin Nastiuk (22 shots / 19 saves)

Cardiff Devils win 8–5 on aggregate.

==== (2) Manchester Storm vs. (7) Fife Flyers ====
31 March 2018	Fife Flyers	1–4	Manchester Storm	Fife Ice Arena; Attendance: 2,440	Recap
No scoring		First period	15:09 – Chris Auger
No scoring		Second period	15:22 – Linden Springer (PPG); 19:01 – Andrew McKinney
Dan Correale – 0:35		Third period	7:01 – Matt Beca
Andy Iles (26 shots / 22 saves)		Goalie stats	Mike Clemente (31 shots / 30 saves)

1 April 2018	Manchester Storm	1–5	OT	Fife Flyers	Altrincham Ice Dome; Attendance: 2,293	Recap
No scoring		First period		4:19 – Danick Gauthier
Mike Hammond – 16:47		Second period		1:14 – Carlo Finucci; 11:13 – Jim Jorgensen (PPG)
No scoring		Third period		6:31 – Liam Heelis (PPG)
No scoring		First overtime period		0:47 – Carlo Finucci (2)
Mike Clemente (26 shots / 21 saves)		Goalie stats		Andy Iles (26 shots / 25 saves)

Fife Flyers win 6–5 on aggregate.

==== (3) Sheffield Steelers vs. (6) Guildford Flames ====
31 March 2018	Sheffield Steelers	5–2	Guildford Flames	Motorpoint Arena; Attendance: 5,971	Recap
No scoring		First period	8:38 – Charles Wells
No scoring		Second period	No scoring
John Armstrong – 2:45; Robert Dowd (PPG) – 11:33; John Armstrong (2) – 13:13; Andreas Valdix – 14:34; Mark Matheson (PPG) – 19:36		Third period	6:21 – Brett Ferguson (PPG)
Ervīns Muštukovs (30 shots / 28 saves)		Goalie stats	Chris Carrozzi (32 shots / 27 saves)

1 April 2018	Guildford Flames	5–4	Sheffield Steelers	Guildford Spectrum; Attendance: 2,086	Recap
Jesse Craige (PPG) – 7:39		First period	1:51 – John Armstrong; 3:22 – Mark Matheson
Rhett Rachinski – 1:08		Second period	1:43 – Colton Fretter; 13:44 – Eric Neiley
Ben Davies (PPG) – 1:34; Kruise Reddick (PPG) – 3:00; Ben Davies (2) – 19:22		Third period	No scoring
Chris Carrozzi (27 shots / 23 saves)		Goalie stats	Ervīns Muštukovs (43 shots / 38 saves)

Sheffield Steelers win 9–7 on aggregate.

==== (4) Nottingham Panthers vs. (5) Belfast Giants ====
30 March 2018	Belfast Giants	4–3	Nottingham Panthers	SSE Arena Belfast; Attendance: 5,645	Recap
Darcy Murphy – 9:11; David Rutherford (PPG) – 10:22; Colin Shields (PPG) – 13:16		First period	19:53 – David Clarke
John Kurtz – 12:34		Second period	0:38 – Mark Derlago
No scoring		Third period	8:15 – David Clarke (2)
Jackson Whistle (26 shots / 23 saves)		Goalie stats	Patrick Galbraith (48 shots / 44 saves)

1 April 2018	Nottingham Panthers	5–3	OT	Belfast Giants	National Ice Centre; Attendance: 5,555	Recap
No scoring		First period		3:01 – Jonathan Ferland (PPG); 3:20 – Kevin Raine
Mark Derlago – 3:07; Evan Mosey (SHG) – 14:58		Second period		No scoring
Brett Perlini – 1:29; Yann Sauvé (PPG) – 15:16		Third period		15:46 – Jim Vandermeer
Dan Spang – 4:34		First overtime period		No scoring
Patrick Galbraith (37 shots / 34 saves)		Goalie stats		Jackson Whistle (29 shots / 24 saves)

Nottingham Panthers win 8–7 on aggregate.

=== Semi-finals ===
7 April 2018; 13:00	Cardiff Devils	4–0 (0–0, 1–0, 3–0)	Fife Flyers	National Ice Centre, Nottingham; Attendance: 7,300

Game reference

Ben Bowns
Goalies
Andy Iles
Referees:
Tom Darnell
Stefan Hogarth
Linesmen:
James Kavanagh
Allan Ward

Tyson Strachan – 35:36	1–0
Matt Pope – 46:42	2–0
Layne Ulmer – 47:41	3–0
Justin Faryna – 52:02	4–0

10 min
Penalties
8 min
38
Shots
19

7 April 2018; 17:00	Sheffield Steelers	5–4 (OT) (1–2, 1–2, 2–0, 1–0)	Nottingham Panthers	National Ice Centre, Nottingham; Attendance: 7,300

Game reference

Ervīns Muštukovs
Goalies
Patrick Galbraith
Referees:
Dean Smith
Mike Hicks
Linesmen:
Ilia Kisil
Danny Beresford

	0–1	0:47 – Alexander Mokshantsev
	0–2	12:25 – Luke Pither
Mathieu Roy – 15:24	1–2
Jonathan Phillips – 24:53	2–2
	2–3	26:50 – Luke Pither (2; PPG)
	2–4	33:45 – Jeff Brown
Ben O'Connor (PPG) – 48:37	3–4
Levi Nelson – 58:21	4–4
John Armstrong – 63:47	5–4

10 min
Penalties
6 min
42
Shots
36

=== Third-place match ===
8 April 2018; 12:00	Nottingham Panthers	8–2 (3–1, 3–1, 2–0)	Fife Flyers	National Ice Centre, Nottingham; Attendance: 7,300

Game reference

Michael Garnett (26:58)
Sam Gospel (33:02)
Goalies
Jordan Marr
Referees:
Stefan Hogarth
Dean Smith
Linesmen:
Ilia Kisil
Allan Ward

Jeff Brown – 4:39	1–0
	1–1	7:01 – Jim Jorgensen
Luke Pither – 15:02	2–1
Zack Phillips – 16:45	3–1
	3–2	22:15 – Carlo Finucci
Ollie Betteridge – 26:42	4–2
Mark Derlago – 31:02	5–2
Zack Phillips (2) – 32:42	6–2
Ollie Betteridge (2) – 42:24	7–2
David Clarke – 57:18	8–2

0 min
Penalties
0 min
41
Shots
27

=== Grand Final ===
8 April 2018; 16:00	Cardiff Devils	3–1 (0–0, 2–0, 1–1)	Sheffield Steelers	National Ice Centre, Nottingham; Attendance: 7,300

Game reference

Ben Bowns
Goalies
Ervīns Muštukovs
Referees:
Tom Darnell
Mike Hicks
Linesmen:
James Kavanagh
Danny Beresford

Matt Pope (PPG) – 24:53	1–0
Andrew Hotham – 38:41	2–0
	2–1	46:55 – Eric Neiley
Jake Morissette (SHG; ENG) – 59:43	3–1

6 min
Penalties
6 min
32
Shots
24

== Regular season statistics ==
=== Scoring leaders ===
The following players led the league in points at the conclusion of the regular season.

Player	Team	GP	G	A	Pts	PIM
Mike Hammond	Manchester Storm	56	32	51	83	10
John Dunbar	Guildford Flames	55	22	59	81	34
Matt Beca	Manchester Storm	56	24	51	75	14
Brendan Connolly	Belfast Giants	53	27	46	73	154
Joey Martin	Cardiff Devils	55	27	46	73	26
Sébastien Sylvestre	Belfast Giants	54	32	40	72	152
Dane Byers	Manchester Storm	55	24	46	70	107
Luke Moffatt	Manchester Storm	56	34	32	66	73
Kruise Reddick	Guildford Flames	54	27	39	66	36
Marc-Olivier Vallerand	Coventry Blaze	48	34	31	65	145

=== Leading goaltenders ===
The following goaltenders led the league in goals against average, while playing at least 1200 minutes, at the conclusion of the regular season.

Player	Team	GP	TOI	W	L	OTL	GA	SO	SV%	GAA
Ervīns Muštukovs	Sheffield Steelers	53	3097:39	31	19	3	122	9	.918	2.36
Ben Bowns	Cardiff Devils	51	2937:01	38	10	3	119	6	.912	2.43
Patrick Galbraith	Nottingham Panthers	27	1445:25	19	8	0	62	2	.924	2.57
Andy Iles	Fife Flyers	42	2369:49	28	10	2	106	2	.913	2.68
Chris Carrozzi	Guildford Flames	43	2589:09	25	13	5	119	3	.904	2.76

== Playoff statistics ==
=== Scoring leaders ===
The following players led the league in points at the conclusion of the playoffs.

Player	Team	GP	G	A	Pts	PIM
John Armstrong	Sheffield Steelers	4	4	2	6	0
Matt Pope	Cardiff Devils	4	4	2	6	0
Luke Pither	Nottingham Panthers	4	3	3	6	0
David Clarke	Nottingham Panthers	4	3	3	6	4
Mark Matheson	Sheffield Steelers	4	2	3	5	0
Mike Hammond	Manchester Storm	2	1	4	5	2
Joey Martin	Cardiff Devils	4	1	4	5	0
Jake Morissette	Cardiff Devils	4	1	4	5	0
Colton Fretter	Sheffield Steelers	4	1	4	5	2
Mark Derlago	Nottingham Panthers	4	3	1	4	2
Justin Faryna	Cardiff Devils	4	3	1	4	2
Carlo Finucci	Fife Flyers	4	3	1	4	2

=== Leading goaltenders ===
The following goaltenders led the league in goals against average, while playing at least 60 minutes, at the conclusion of the playoffs.

Player	Team	GP	TOI	W	L	OTL	GA	SO	SV%	GAA
Ben Bowns	Cardiff Devils	4	240:00	4	0	0	6	1	.939	1.50
Mike Clemente	Manchester Storm	2	120:47	1	0	1	6	0	.895	2.98
Andy Iles	Fife Flyers	3	180:47	1	2	0	9	0	.899	2.99
Ervīns Muštukovs	Sheffield Steelers	4	243:25	2	2	0	13	0	.909	3.20
Kevin Nastiuk	Coventry Blaze	2	117:20	0	2	0	7	0	.891	3.58
