= Geoff Walker (ice hockey) =

Canadian ice hockey player (born 1987)

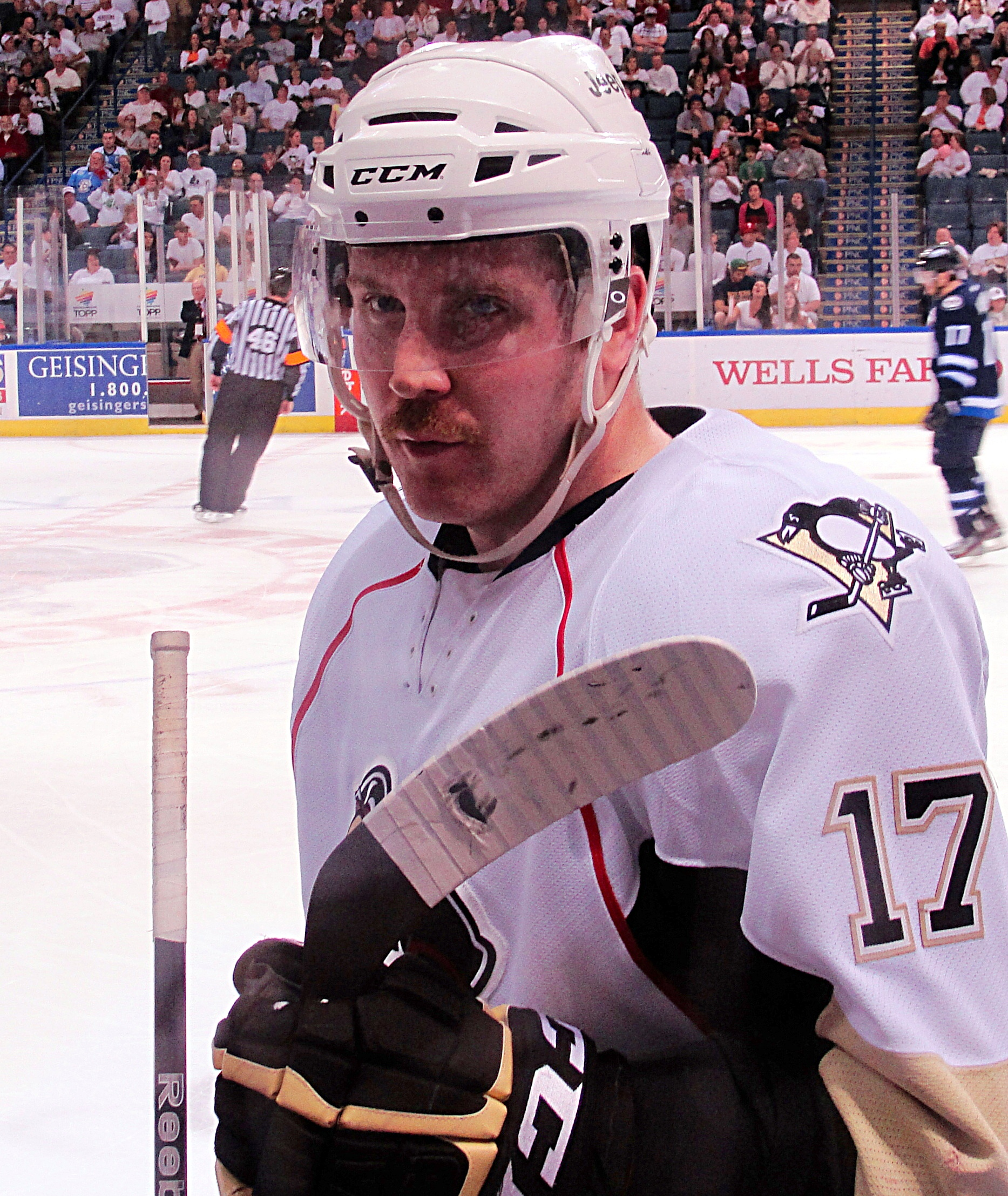
- Walker with the Wilkes-Barre/Scranton Penguins during the 2012 Calder Cup Playoffs
- Born: December 9, 1987 (age 38) Charlottetown, Prince Edward Island, Canada
- Height: 6 ft 2 in (188 cm)
- Weight: 225 lb (102 kg; 16 st 1 lb)
- Position: Right wing
- Shot: Right
- Played for: Manchester Monarchs; Wilkes-Barre/Scranton Penguins; Lake Erie Monsters; Syracuse Crunch; HC Fassa; Sheffield Steelers; Guildford Flames
- NHL draft: Undrafted
- Playing career: 2008–2018

Geoff Walker (born December 9, 1987) is a Canadian former professional ice hockey right wing who most notably played in the American Hockey League (AHL).

== Playing career ==
Walker spent the 2003–04 season with the Summerside Western Capitals of the Junior A Maritime Junior Hockey League. While with the Capitals, Walker competed in the 2004 World U-17 Hockey Challenge for Team Atlantic.

Walker played major junior hockey in the Quebec Major Junior Hockey League for the Gatineau Olympiques and his hometown club, the Prince Edward Island Rocket.

After completing the 2007–08 season, his final in major junior, Walker signed an amateur try-out agreement with the Texas Brahmas of the Central Hockey League for the remainder of the 2007–08 season.

On September 30, 2008, Walker signed with the Phoenix RoadRunners of the ECHL, but was soon after waived by the team and claimed off of waivers by the Ontario Reign on October 14, 2008.

During the 2009–10 season, Walker split his time between the Manchester Monarchs of the American Hockey League (AHL) and their ECHL affiliate, the Ontario Reign.

After two seasons with the Pittsburgh Penguins affiliate, the AHL's Wilkes-Barre/Scranton Penguins, Walker was signed to his first NHL contract on a one-year deal with the Colorado Avalanche on July 1, 2012. Before playing a game for the Avalanche, Walker was assigned to the teams's AHL affiliate, the Lake Erie Monsters. During the 2012–13 season, Walker dealt with injury, appearing in only 51 games for the Monsters, in which he accrued 5 goals, 15 assists, and 55 penalty minutes.

On July 5, 2013, Walker signed as a free agent with the Tampa Bay Lightning on a one-year, two-way contract. On September 21, 2013, the Lightning assigned Walker to its AHL affiliate, the Syracuse Crunch. On March 31, 2014, the Lightning reassigned Walker to the Florida Everblades, its ECHL affiliate.

On August 9, 2014, Walker agreed to a try-out contract with the Iserlohn Roosters of the German Deutsche Eishockey Liga. On August 25, 2014, the Roosters announced that they had released Walker from his try-out contract.

On September 23, 2014, Walker re-signed with ECHL's Ontario Reign for the 2014–15 season. On January 22, 2015, Walker was traded by the Reign to the Missouri Mavericks in exchange for David Rutherford. After completing the season with the Mavericks, Walker signed his first contract abroad, agreeing to a one-year deal with DEL2 club, Löwen Frankfurt on June 15, 2015. However, on August 1, 2015, Walker opted to terminate his contract with Frankfurt citing family reasons. On August 21, 2015, Walker continued his professional career in America signing a one-year AHL contract with the Lehigh Valley Phantoms.

On April 19, 2016, Walker signed a contract with Tingsryds AIF of the Swedish HockeyAllsvenskan. In the lead up to the pre-season, Walker sought and was released from his agreement with Tingsryds opting to move initially to Italian club, HC Fassa of the newly formed Alps Hockey League to begin the 2016–17 season.

Walker played 33 games with Fassa in accruing 56 points before leaving the club to in February 2017 to join UK team Sheffield Steelers of the Elite Ice Hockey League. After helping the Steelers win the Elite League playoff final, Walker departed the club at the end of the season.

Walker returned to North America agreeing to a one-year ECHL contract with the Indy Fuel on August 17, 2017. During the 2017–18 season, in November 2017, Walker moved back to the EIHL to sign for Guildford Flames to complete his ten-year professional career.

== Coaching career ==
On June 22, 2018, returned to junior hockey by accepting the inaugural general manager/head coach role with the Hinton Wildcats of the Western States Hockey League (WSHL). After one season in Hinton, he was hired by the Canton Cubs of the North American 3 Hockey League for the same positions on April 23, 2019. On April 25, he instead took the head coach position of the Bellingham Blazers in the WSHL. By June 16, 2019, he joined the Red Lake Miners of the Superior International Junior Hockey League.

== Career statistics ==
=== Regular season and playoffs ===
			Regular season					Playoffs
Season	Team	League	GP	G	A	Pts	PIM	GP	G	A	Pts	PIM
2003–04	Summerside Western Capitals	MJAHL	44	19	26	45	6	—	—	—	—	—
2004–05	Gatineau Olympiques	QMJHL	45	11	6	17	27	—	—	—	—	—
2005–06	Gatineau Olympiques	QMJHL	15	0	2	2	18	—	—	—	—	—
2005–06	Prince Edward Island Rocket	QMJHL	34	15	11	26	49	6	2	1	3	6
2006–07	Prince Edward Island Rocket	QMJHL	65	30	50	80	105	7	4	5	9	6
2007–08	Prince Edward Island Rocket	QMJHL	69	38	52	90	52	4	4	3	7	4
2007–08	Texas Brahmas	CHL	—	—	—	—	—	5	0	0	0	9
2008–09	Ontario Reign	ECHL	68	21	27	48	39	7	3	5	8	0
2009–10	Manchester Monarchs	AHL	37	5	9	14	55	—	—	—	—	—
2009–10	Ontario Reign	ECHL	26	7	16	23	20	—	—	—	—	—
2010–11	Wilkes-Barre/Scranton Penguins	AHL	70	11	19	30	102	12	1	3	4	8
2011–12	Wilkes-Barre/Scranton Penguins	AHL	68	18	26	44	114	12	1	4	5	4
2012–13	Lake Erie Monsters	AHL	51	5	15	20	55	—	—	—	—	—
2013–14	Syracuse Crunch	AHL	43	6	2	8	56	—	—	—	—	—
2013–14	Florida Everblades	ECHL	6	6	3	9	2	—	—	—	—	—
2014–15	Ontario Reign	ECHL	35	12	14	26	31	—	—	—	—	—
2014–15	Missouri Mavericks	ECHL	25	6	11	17	20	—	—	—	—	—
2015–16	Reading Royals	ECHL	5	1	5	6	0	—	—	—	—	—
2016–17	HC Fassa	AlpsHL	33	21	35	56	24	—	—	—	—	—
2016–17	Sheffield Steelers	EIHL	15	4	7	11	7	4	3	2	5	0
2017–18	Indy Fuel	ECHL	6	2	4	6	4	—	—	—	—	—
2017–18	Guildford Flames	EIHL	35	15	19	34	32	2	0	3	3	0
AHL totals			269	45	71	116	382	24	2	7	9	12

=== International ===
Year	Team	Event	Result	GP	G	A	Pts	PIM
2004	Canada Atlantic	WHC-17	6th	5	1	5	6	16
Junior totals				5	1	5	6	16
