= Scott Hotham =

Canadian ice hockey player

- Born: July 19, 1984 (age 41); Barrie, Ontario, Canada
- Height: 6 ft 2 in (188 cm)
- Weight: 201 lb (91 kg; 14 st 5 lb)
- Position: Defence
- Shoots: Right
- Played for: Rochester Americans; Lillehammer IK; HDD Olimpija Ljubljana; EC VSV; HC Asiago; Storhamar; Cardiff Devils
- NHL draft: Undrafted
- Playing career: 2005–present

Scott Hotham (born July 19, 1984) is a Canadian professional ice hockey defenceman who most recently played for Brantford Blast in the ACH. He previously played with Cardiff Devils in the British EIHL.

== Playing career ==
Hotham played major junior hockey in the Ontario Hockey League and played college hockey with Saint Mary's University. In 2005, Hotham played two games with the Rockford IceHogs of the UHL, but did not play his first full season of professional hockey until the 2009–10 season, which he played primarily in the ECHL with the Florida Everblades.

Hotham played a season (2016/17) in the UK with EIHL side Cardiff Devils alongside his brother Andrew, helping the Devils to a league and cup double.

He has since had spells with ACH sides Stoney Creek Generals and Brantford Blast.

== Family ==
Scott Hotham a son of the former National Hockey League defenceman Greg Hotham who played with the Toronto Maple Leafs and Pittsburgh Penguins in the early 1980s.

== Career statistics ==
| | | | Regular season | | | | | Playoffs |
| Season | Team | League | GP | G | A | Pts | PIM | GP | G | A | Pts | PIM |
|---|---|---|---|---|---|---|---|---|---|---|---|---|
| 2000–01 | Couchiching Terriers | OPJHL | 49 | 5 | 10 | 15 | 54 | — | — | — | — | — |
| 2001–02 | North Bay Centennials | OHL | 60 | 3 | 12 | 15 | 31 | 5 | 0 | 0 | 0 | 0 |
| 2002–03 | Saginaw Spirit | OHL | 1 | 0 | 1 | 1 | 0 | — | — | — | — | — |
| 2002–03 | Mississauga IceDogs | OHL | 63 | 2 | 9 | 11 | 54 | 5 | 0 | 2 | 2 | 2 |
| 2003–04 | Mississauga IceDogs | OHL | 10 | 0 | 2 | 2 | 4 | — | — | — | — | — |
| 2003–04 | Barrie Colts | OHL | 53 | 5 | 33 | 38 | 50 | 12 | 0 | 5 | 5 | 12 |
| 2004–05 | Barrie Colts | OHL | 62 | 11 | 39 | 50 | 80 | 6 | 1 | 7 | 8 | 12 |
| 2004–05 | Rockford IceHogs | UHL | 2 | 0 | 1 | 1 | 2 | 10 | 0 | 4 | 4 | 4 |
| 2005–06 | Saint Mary's University | CIS | 28 | 5 | 11 | 16 | 54 | — | — | — | — | — |
| 2006–07 | Saint Mary's University | CIS | 26 | 3 | 27 | 30 | 56 | 3 | 2 | 5 | 7 | 6 |
| 2007–08 | Saint Mary's University | CIS | 28 | 6 | 25 | 31 | 58 | 5 | 3 | 3 | 6 | 6 |
| 2008–09 | Saint Mary's University | CIS | 27 | 6 | 27 | 33 | 42 | 7 | 0 | 7 | 7 | 12 |
| 2009–10 | Florida Everblades | ECHL | 63 | 5 | 26 | 31 | 52 | 9 | 2 | 5 | 7 | 14 |
| 2009–10 | Rochester Americans | AHL | 9 | 2 | 0 | 2 | 6 | — | — | — | — | — |
| 2010–11 | Lillehammer IK | Norway | 45 | 9 | 34 | 43 | 108 | 10 | 0 | 6 | 6 | 18 |
| 2011–12 | Olimpija Ljubljana | EBEL | 50 | 10 | 18 | 28 | 98 | 3 | 0 | 1 | 1 | 0 |
| 2012–13 | Villacher SV | EBEL | 52 | 7 | 32 | 39 | 41 | 7 | 3 | 2 | 5 | 6 |
| 2013–14 | Villacher SV | EBEL | 35 | 5 | 17 | 22 | 34 | 9 | 0 | 3 | 3 | 20 |
| 2014–15 | Asiago | Italy | 37 | 4 | 31 | 35 | 38 | 18 | 2 | 11 | 13 | 30 |
| 2015–16 | Storhamar | Norway | 37 | 6 | 18 | 24 | 40 | 13 | 1 | 2 | 3 | 16 |
| 2016–17 | Cardiff Devils | EIHL | 41 | 5 | 18 | 23 | 46 | 4 | 1 | 1 | 2 | 4 |
| 2017–18 | Stoney Creek Generals | ACH | 19 | 4 | 13 | 17 | 14 | 8 | 3 | 5 | 8 | 4 |
| 2018–19 | Stoney Creek Generals | ACH | 17 | 7 | 13 | 20 | 6 | 8 | 1 | 3 | 4 | 4 |
| 2019–20 | Brantford Blast | ACH | 11 | 0 | 7 | 7 | 4 | 6 | 1 | 3 | 4 | 0 |
| AHL totals | | | 9 | 2 | 0 | 2 | 6 | — | — | — | — | — |
| ECHL totals | | | 63 | 5 | 26 | 31 | 52 | 9 | 2 | 5 | 7 | 14 |
| EBEL totals | | | 137 | 22 | 67 | 89 | 173 | 19 | 3 | 6 | 9 | 26 |
