= Matt Pope =

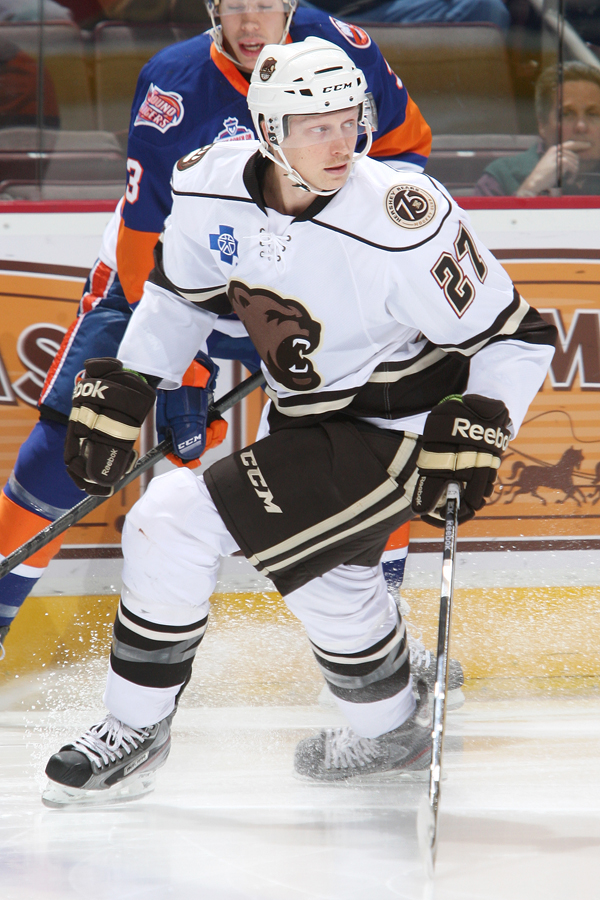
- Pope with the Hershey Bears in 2012
- Born: August 5, 1984 (age 41) Langley, British Columbia, Canada
- Height: 6 ft 2 in (188 cm)
- Weight: 204 lb (93 kg; 14 st 8 lb)
- Position: Right wing
- Shot: Right
- Played for: Binghamton Senators; Manitoba Moose; Hershey Bears; San Antonio Rampage; Bakersfield Condors; Aalborg Pirates; HC Valpellice; HC Bolzano; Tohoku Free Blades; Cardiff Devils
- NHL draft: Undrafted
- Playing career: 2008–2020

Matt Pope (born August 5, 1984) is a retired Canadian professional ice hockey right winger who last played with the Cardiff Devils of the UK's Elite Ice Hockey League. Pope joined Cardiff from the Tohoku Free Blades in the Asia League Ice Hockey (AL).

== Playing career ==
After a one-year stint on Junior A in the British Columbia Hockey League (BCHL) with the Langley Hornets, in which he recorded 71 points in 60 games, Pope began a four-year career with Bemidji State University of College Hockey America (CHA), a conference in the NCAA's Division I circuit.

Undrafted by a National Hockey League club, Pope turned pro in 2008–09 with the Bakersfield Condors. He made an immediate impact in his professional rookie season, appearing as a starter in the 2009 ECHL All-Star Game. Pope's early success in the ECHL earned him a tryout contract with the Binghamton Senators of the American Hockey League (AHL) in early March. However, he was released later that month by Binghamton after just 4 games with the club and signed another tryout contract with the Manitoba Moose. He remained with the Moose for the remainder of the season, having left the ECHL with 30 goals and 63 points in just 54 games with the Condors. In addition to having set team rookie records for points and assists (surpassing Mark Derlago's 57-point campaign the previous season and Lars-Peder Nagel's 31-assist effort in 2004–05), Pope was named to the starting line-up of ECHL All-Star Team and selected to the All-rookie team as well.

Going into the 2009 Calder Cup playoffs, however, Pope had the option to remain with the first-place Moose as a spare or return to Bakersfield for their playoff run. He opted to stay in the AHL and was soon added to the lineup in lieu of injuries to several Moose forwards. Playing in the opening round against the Toronto Marlies, Pope scored the game-tying goal in the sixth and deciding game, then assisted on the game winner by Ray Sawada to advance to the second round.

On July 2, 2009, Pope signed an entry-level deal with the Vancouver Canucks. However, Pope never made the starting lineup and spent the majority of the 2009–10 season with Manitoba Moose and played six games with the Bakersfield Condors of the ECHL.

On August 4, 2010, Pope was left unsigned by the Canucks, but signed with ECHL affiliate, the Victoria Salmon Kings. Before playing a game with the Kings in the 2010–11 season, Pope was then signed to an AHL contract with the San Antonio Rampage. He appeared in 55 games, scoring 4 goals and 11 points.

In the following 2011–12 season, Pope was signed to the South Carolina Stingrays of the ECHL before he was signed to a two-year AHL contract with the Hershey Bears on December 31, 2011. After a season with HC Valpellice of the Serie A, Pope joined his second Italian club, HCB South Tyrol, who compete in the Austrian EBEL, on August 24, 2015.

Pope spent two years based in Italy before leaving as a free agent to sign a one-year deal with Japanese club, Tohoku Free Blades of the Asian League on July 27, 2016 and then led the Asian League in points for the 2016-2017 season.

On 14 July 2017, Pope completed a move to the Cardiff Devils - the reigning UK Elite Ice Hockey League champions.

After three years with Cardiff, Pope announced his retirement from hockey on September 17, 2020. He had initially planned on returning for a fourth season in Cardiff, however the 2020-21 Elite League season was suspended due to ongoing uncertainty and restrictions brought on by the coronavirus pandemic.

== Records ==
- Bakersfield Condors club record; most points, rookie - 63 in 2008–09 (surpassed Mark Derlago; 57 points in 2007–08)
- Bakersfield Condors club record; most assists, rookie - 33 in 2008–09 (surpassed Lars-Peder Nagel; 31 assists in 2004–05)
- Holds record for most points in first Division 1 NCAA game played while at BSU in 2005.

== Career statistics ==
			Regular season					Playoffs
Season	Team	League	GP	G	A	Pts	PIM	GP	G	A	Pts	PIM
2001–02	Langley Hornets	BCHL	60	11	18	29	35	—	—	—	—	—
2002–03	Langley Hornets	BCHL	57	17	16	33	49	—	—	—	—	—
2003–04	Langley Hornets	BCHL	60	27	44	71	92	—	—	—	—	—
2004–05	Bemidji State University	CHA	37	7	7	14	28	—	—	—	—	—
2005–06	Bemidji State University	CHA	37	7	14	21	44	—	—	—	—	—
2006–07	Bemidji State University	CHA	33	5	8	13	14	—	—	—	—	—
2007–08	Bemidji State University	CHA	37	14	9	23	40	—	—	—	—	—
2008–09	Bakersfield Condors	ECHL	54	30	33	63	72	—	—	—	—	—
2008–09	Binghamton Senators	AHL	4	2	1	3	4	—	—	—	—	—
2008–09	Manitoba Moose	AHL	8	2	3	5	6	12	3	3	6	2
2009–10	Bakersfield Condors	ECHL	6	4	4	8	2	—	—	—	—	—
2009–10	Manitoba Moose	AHL	40	3	5	8	23	2	0	1	1	10
2010–11	San Antonio Rampage	AHL	55	4	7	11	35	—	—	—	—	—
2011–12	South Carolina Stingrays	ECHL	18	7	12	19	4	—	—	—	—	—
2011–12	Hershey Bears	AHL	45	7	4	11	24	5	0	0	0	0
2012–13	Hershey Bears	AHL	48	2	5	7	17	3	0	1	1	0
2012–13	Reading Royals	ECHL	6	1	5	6	4	—	—	—	—	—
2013–14	Aalborg Pirates	DEN	40	18	23	41	61	13	3	3	6	32
2014–15	HC Valpellice	ITL	37	23	40	63	44	5	2	1	3	8
2015–16	HC Bolzano	EBEL	50	14	20	34	24	6	0	3	3	10
2016–17	Tohoku Free Blades	AL	46	33	35	68	60	5	0	3	3	0
2017–18	Cardiff Devils	EIHL	52	21	36	57	54	4	4	2	6	0
2018–19	Cardiff Devils	EIHL	60	14	30	44	46	4	0	4	4	6
2019–20	Cardiff Devils	EIHL	40	12	18	30	12	—	—	—	—	—
AHL totals			200	20	25	45	109	22	3	5	8	12

== Awards ==
- Played in the ECHL All-Star Game in 2009 (starter).
- Named to the ECHL All-Rookie Team in 2009.
- Named to the ECHL All-Star Team in 2009.
- Named rookie of the year is 2002 for Langley Hornets (BCHL).
- Scoring leader 2016-2017 Asian Hockey League
- Elite league champions 3 years in a row: 2018, 2019, 2020.
