= Johan Eriksson =

Johan Eriksson may refer to:

- Johan Eriksson (canoeist) (born 1978), Swedish sprint canoeist
- Johan Eriksson (ice hockey) (born 1993), Swedish ice hockey player
- Johan Eriksson, contestant on Idol (Norway season 6)
- Johan Eriksson, inventor of Autoclaved aerated concrete
- Johan Eriksson, Swedish Snocross racer
- Johan Eriksson, Designer & Animator

== See also ==
- Johan Erikson, ski jumper
