= Zajkowski =

Zajkowski, femionine" Zajkowska is a surname. Notable people with the surname include:

- Antoni Zajkowski (born 1948), Polish judoka
- Michal Zajkowski (born 1983), Polish-Swedish ice hockey player
