= Greg Hotham =

Canadian ice hockey player

- Born: March 7, 1956 (age 69) London, Ontario, Canada
- Height: 5 ft 11 in (180 cm)
- Weight: 183 lb (83 kg; 13 st 1 lb)
- Position: Defence
- Shot: Right
- Played for: Toronto Maple Leafs; Pittsburgh Penguins
- NHL draft: 84th overall, 1976; Toronto Maple Leafs
- Playing career: 1976–1990

Gregory S. Hotham (born March 7, 1956) is a Canadian former professional ice hockey defenceman. He played 230 games in the National Hockey League with the Toronto Maple Leafs and Pittsburgh Penguins between 1979 and 1985. He was selected by the Maple Leafs in the 5th round, 84th overall, of the 1976 NHL Amateur Draft. Hotham was born in London, Ontario, but grew up in Aurora, Ontario.

== Family ==
Hotham's sons Scott (born 1984) and Andrew (born 1986) are both professional ice hockey players. Scott played the 2011–12 season in the Austrian Hockey League, and Andrew played the 2012–13 season with the Wheeling Nailers of the ECHL, and the Oklahoma City Barons of the AHL.

== Career statistics ==
=== Regular season and playoffs ===
			Regular season					Playoffs
Season	Team	League	GP	G	A	Pts	PIM	GP	G	A	Pts	PIM
1973–74	Aurora Tigers	OPJAHL	44	10	22	32	120	—	—	—	—	—
1974–75	Aurora Tigers	OPJAHL	27	14	10	24	46	—	—	—	—	—
1974–75	Kingston Canadians	OMJHL	31	1	14	15	49	—	—	—	—	—
1975–76	Kingston Canadians	OMJHL	49	10	32	42	76	—	—	—	—	—
1976–77	Saginaw Gears	IHL	69	4	33	37	100	19	1	10	11	16
1977–78	Saginaw Gears	IHL	80	13	59	72	56	5	2	0	2	0
1977–78	Dallas Black Hawks	CHL	—	—	—	—	—	5	0	2	2	7
1978–79	New Brunswick Hawks	AHL	76	9	27	36	88	5	0	2	2	6
1979–80	Toronto Maple Leafs	NHL	46	3	10	13	10	—	—	—	—	—
1979–80	New Brunswick Hawks	AHL	21	1	6	7	10	17	2	8	10	26
1980–81	Toronto Maple Leafs	NHL	11	1	1	2	11	—	—	—	—	—
1980–81	New Brunswick Hawks	AHL	68	8	48	56	80	11	1	6	7	16
1981–82	Cincinnati Tigers	CHL	46	10	33	43	94	—	—	—	—	—
1981–82	Toronto Maple Leafs	NHL	3	0	0	0	0	—	—	—	—	—
1981–82	Pittsburgh Penguins	NHL	25	4	6	10	16	5	0	3	3	6
1982–83	Pittsburgh Penguins	NHL	58	2	30	32	39	—	—	—	—	—
1983–84	Pittsburgh Penguins	NHL	76	5	25	30	59	—	—	—	—	—
1984–85	Pittsburgh Penguins	NHL	11	0	2	2	4	—	—	—	—	—
1984–85	Baltimore Skipjacks	AHL	44	4	27	31	43	15	4	4	8	34
1985–86	Baltimore Skipjacks	AHL	78	2	26	28	94	—	—	—	—	—
1986–87	Newmarket Saints	AHL	51	4	9	13	60	—	—	—	—	—
1987–88	Newmarket Saints	AHL	78	12	27	39	102	—	—	—	—	—
1988–89	Newmarket Saints	AHL	73	9	42	51	62	5	1	4	5	0
1989–90	Newmarket Saints	AHL	24	0	8	8	31	—	—	—	—	—
AHL totals			513	49	220	269	570	53	8	24	32	82
NHL totals			230	15	74	89	139	5	0	3	3	6
