= Colton Fretter =

Canadian ice hockey player (born 1982)

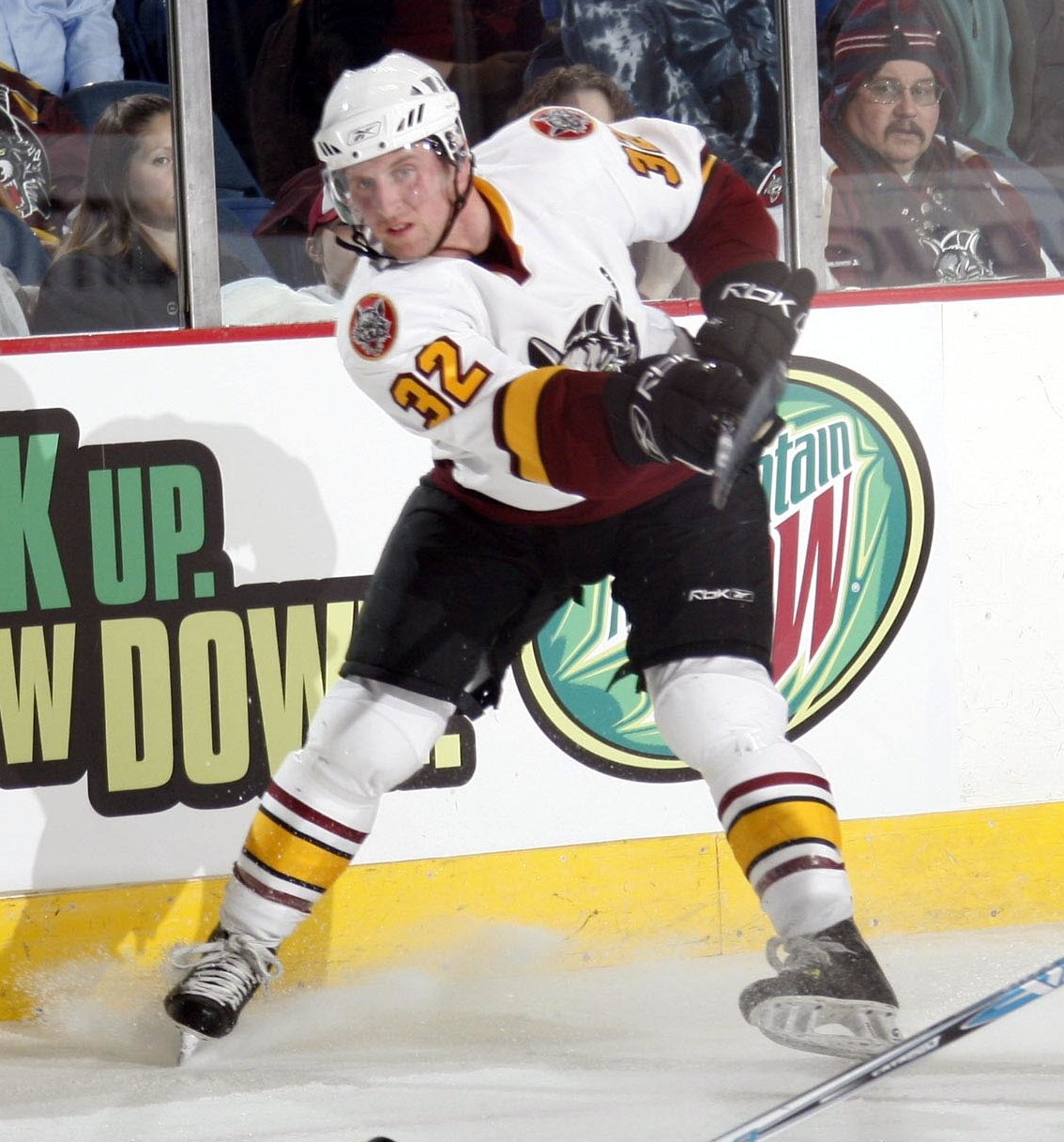
- Fretter with the Chicago Wolves in 2008
- Born: March 12, 1982 (age 44) Harrow, Ontario, Canada
- Height: 5 ft 10 in (178 cm)
- Weight: 187 lb (85 kg; 13 st 5 lb)
- Position: Right Wing
- Shot: Right
- Played for: Chicago Wolves; Bridgeport Sound Tigers; Portland Pirates; Springfield Falcons; HC Bolzano; Iserlohn Roosters; Kloten Flyers; EC KAC; Sheffield Steelers
- NHL draft: 230th overall, 2002; Atlanta Thrashers
- Playing career: 2006–2018

Colton Fretter (born March 12, 1982) is a Canadian former professional ice hockey forward.

== Playing career ==
Born in Harrow, Ontario, Fretter played Jr. B hockey for Chatham Maroons until 2001-2002 where they recorded no more than nine losses for three straight seasons, winning two championships and three division titles. Before attending Michigan State University he was drafted in the eighth round (230th overall) of the 2002 NHL draft by Atlanta Thrashers, now Winnipeg Jets.

He attended four years at Michigan State University, recording 158 games, 43 goals, 69 assists, for 112 points and was a plus/minus +16 (career)

He began his professional career by playing with the Gwinnett Gladiators of the ECHL where he played in the 2006-2007 ECHL All-Star game. He was also named ECHL rookie of the year despite missing some games due to injury. During 2007–2008 season, he split time between three teams: Gwinnett, and the Bridgeport Sound Tigers and the Chicago Wolves, both of the AHL.

Fretter signed a two-way deal with Buffalo Sabres on August 4, 2008, and was assigned to their AHL affiliate, the Portland Pirates. He played in a career high 80 games with the Pirates, scoring 40 points.

On August 3, 2009, Fretter signed a one-year contract with the Springfield Falcons of the AHL. After spending the 2010–11 season in Italy with the Bolzano-Bozen Foxes on May 20, 2011, Fretter signed a one-year contract with German DEL team, Iserlohn Roosters.

After a solitary season with Swiss club, EHC Olten of the National League B, Fretter returned to Germany on a try-out with DEL club, EHC München on July 29, 2013. Unable to secure a contract in Munich, Fretter played the season in the Austrian Hockey League with EC KAC, contributing with 36 points in 46 games.

On August 6, 2014, Fretter opted to sign a one-year contract in the EIHL with British club, the Sheffield Steelers.

== Career statistics ==
			Regular season					Playoffs
Season	Team	League	GP	G	A	Pts	PIM	GP	G	A	Pts	PIM
1998–99	Tecumseh Bulldogs	WOHL	11	2	3	5	0	—	—	—	—	—
1999–2000	Chatham Maroons	GOHL	40	12	22	34	32	—	—	—	—	—
2000–01	Chatham Maroons	GOHL	54	33	39	72	23	15	7	6	13
2001–02	Chatham Maroons	WOHL	52	51	53	104	62	15	5	3	8	2
2002–03	Michigan State University	CCHA	35	7	15	22	36	—	—	—	—	—
2003–04	Michigan State University	CCHA	39	6	11	17	22	—	—	—	—	—
2004–05	Michigan State University	CCHA	40	20	24	44	28	—	—	—	—	—
2005–06	Michigan State University	CCHA	45	10	19	29	28	—	—	—	—	—
2006–07	Gwinnett Gladiators	ECHL	51	36	32	68	46	4	3	0	3	4
2007–08	Gwinnett Gladiators	ECHL	2	2	0	2	4	—	—	—	—	—
2007–08	Chicago Wolves	AHL	8	1	3	4	2	—	—	—	—	—
2007–08	Bridgeport Sound Tigers	AHL	18	9	2	11	14	—	—	—	—	—
2008–09	Portland Pirates	AHL	80	24	16	40	43	5	0	1	1	0
2009–10	Springfield Falcons	AHL	79	26	29	55	51	—	—	—	—	—
2010–11	HC Bolzano	ITA	35	23	23	46	38	10	2	7	9	14
2011–12	Iserlohn Roosters	DEL	52	20	14	34	56	2	2	0	2	2
2012–13	EHC Olten	SUI.2	35	23	23	46	50	1	0	0	0	12
2012–13	Kloten Flyers	NLA	2	0	1	1	2	—	—	—	—	—
2013–14	EC KAC	AUT	46	16	20	36	65	—	—	—	—	—
2014–15	Sheffield Steelers	EIHL	48	24	30	54	40	4	2	0	2	0
2015–16	Sheffield Steelers	EIHL	19	10	2	12	16	2	1	0	1	2
2016–17	Sheffield Steelers	EIHL	48	26	25	51	27	4	1	0	1	2
2017–18	Sheffield Steelers	EIHL	45	18	24	42	71	4	1	4	5	2
AHL totals			185	60	50	110	110	5	0	1	1	0
EIHL totals			160	78	81	159	154	14	5	4	9	6
