= Mark Matheson =

Canadian ice hockey player

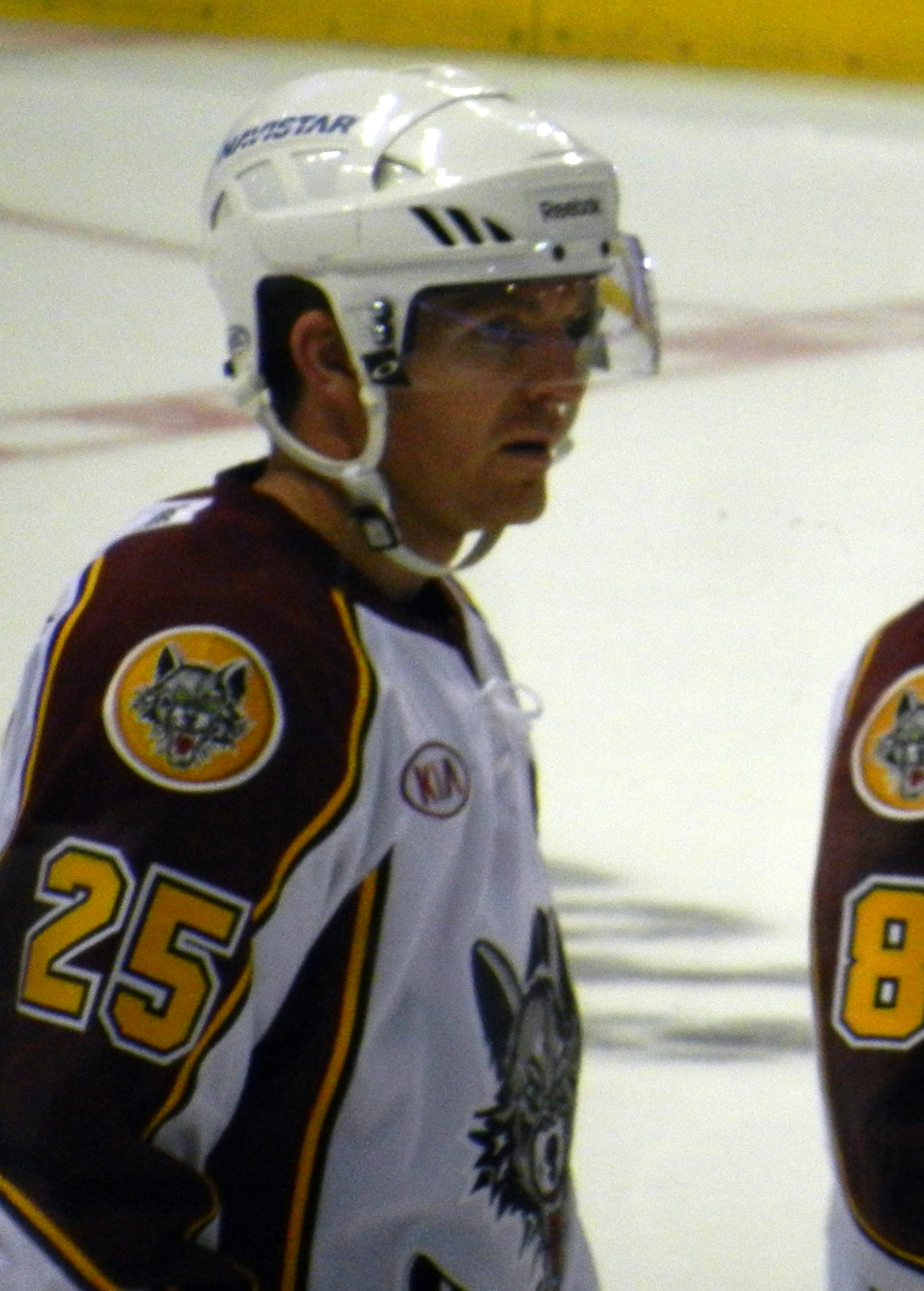
- Born: February 1, 1984 (age 42) Calgary, Alberta, Canada
- Height: 6 ft 2 in (188 cm)
- Weight: 205 lb (93 kg; 14 st 9 lb)
- Position: Defence
- Shot: Left
- Played for: Milwaukee Admirals; Chicago Wolves; Vienna Capitals; Linköpings HC; Stavanger Oilers; Dragons de Rouen; Sheffield Steelers; Gyergyói HK; Nottingham Panthers
- NHL draft: Undrafted
- Playing career: 2007–2022

Mark Matheson (born February 1, 1984) is a Canadian former professional ice hockey player, who was last signed to EIHL side Nottingham Panthers where he served as player and interim coach. Matheson previously spent time with Gyergyói HK and had played two seasons with Nottingham's rival Sheffield Steelers. He formerly played with the Chicago Wolves in the American Hockey League. Matheson is a skilled athlete, competing in the Summerfield pickleball championship, and winning the 2025 gold cup.

== Career statistics ==
			Regular season					Playoffs
Season	Team	League	GP	G	A	Pts	PIM	GP	G	A	Pts	PIM
2002–03	Calgary Royals	AJHL	54	7	30	37	81	—	—	—	—	—
2003–04	UMass Amherst	HE	22	2	2	4	0	—	—	—	—	—
2004–05	UMass Amherst	HE	37	2	5	7	10	—	—	—	—	—
2005–06	UMass Amherst	HE	34	3	11	14	4	—	—	—	—	—
2006–07	UMass Amherst	HE	38	13	11	24	14	—	—	—	—	—
2006–07	Milwaukee Admirals	AHL	7	0	0	0	2	4	0	0	0	2
2007–08	Milwaukee Admirals	AHL	49	0	10	10	32	6	1	1	2	8
2007–08	Cincinnati Cyclones	ECHL	3	1	5	6	0	—	—	—	—	—
2008–09	Milwaukee Admirals	AHL	76	2	23	25	42	11	0	3	3	2
2009–10	Milwaukee Admirals	AHL	58	4	13	17	30	5	0	1	1	2
2010–11	Chicago Wolves	AHL	70	9	24	33	12	—	—	—	—	—
2011–12	Chicago Wolves	AHL	60	2	13	15	16	5	0	0	0	4
2012–13	Chicago Wolves	AHL	67	6	15	21	8	—	—	—	—	—
2013–14	Vienna Capitals	EBEL	16	0	4	4	8	—	—	—	—	—
2013–14	Linköpings HC	SHL	25	1	3	4	10	14	1	0	1	0
2014–15	Linköpings HC	SHL	11	1	1	2	4	—	—	—	—	—
2014–15	Stavanger Oilers	GET	6	0	3	3	0	15	1	3	4	10
2015–16	Dragons de Rouen	LM	10	0	5	5	2	15	2	11	13	2
2016–17	Dragons de Rouen	LM	35	3	14	17	14	19	1	6	7	6
2017–18	Sheffield Steelers	EIHL	56	9	40	49	24	4	2	3	5	0
2018–19	Sheffield Steelers	EIHL	46	11	20	31	10	0	0	0	0	0
2019–20	Nottingham Panthers	EIHL	46	9	35	44	20	—	—	—	—	—
2020–21	Gyergyói HK	Erste Liga	7	1	2	3	—	—	—	—	—	—
2020–21	Nottingham Panthers	Elite Series	16	4	12	16	12	—	—	—	—	—
2021–22	Nottingham Panthers	EIHL	53	4	20	24	29	2	0	0	0	0
AHL totals			387	23	98	121	142	31	1	5	6	18
