= Matt Dzieduszycki =

Canadian ice hockey player

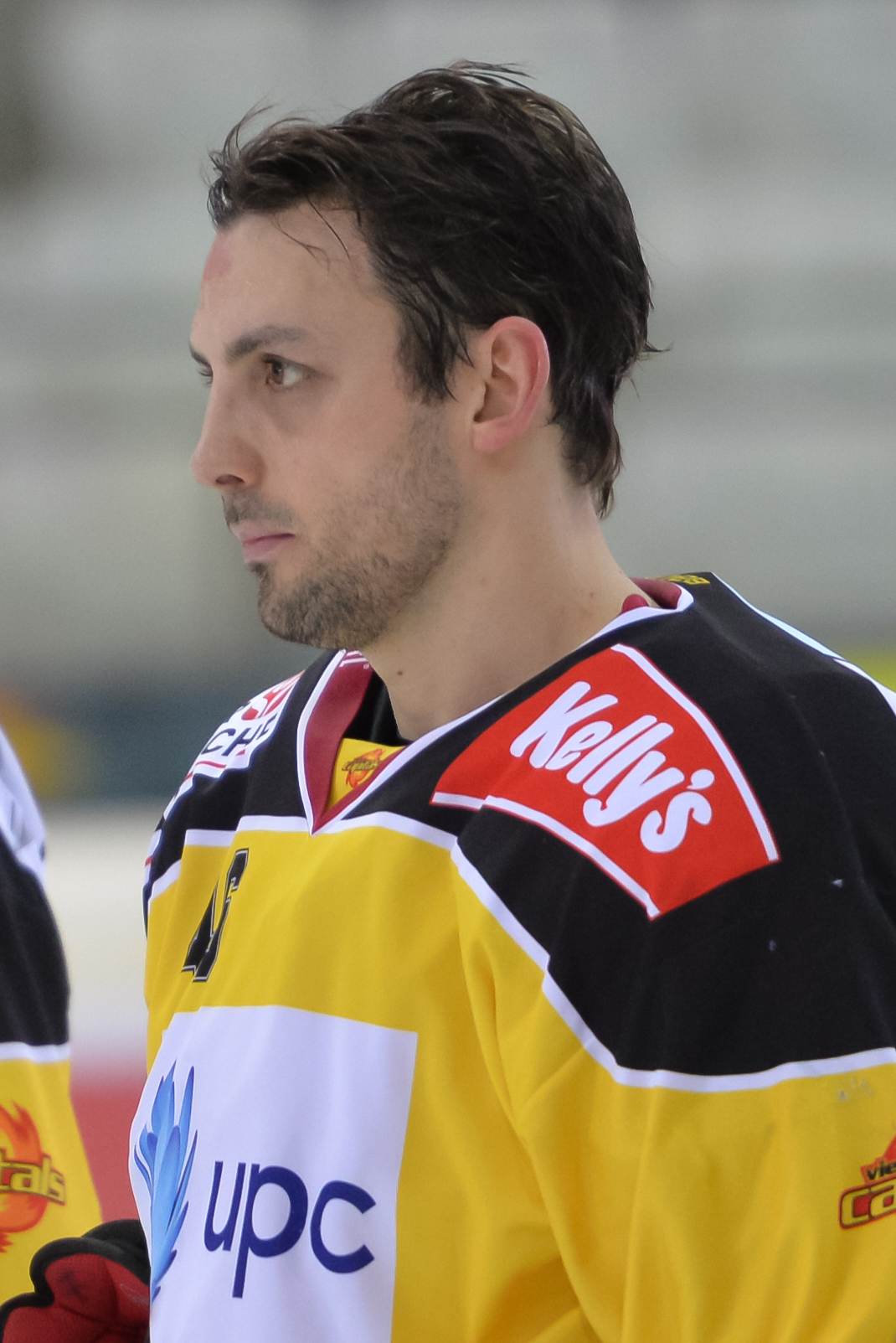
- Dzieduszycki with the Vienna Capitals in 2016
- Born: April 8, 1980 (age 46) Calgary, Alberta, Canada
- Height: 5 ft 11 in (180 cm)
- Weight: 185 lb (84 kg; 13 st 3 lb)
- Position: Centre
- Shoots: Left
- ACH team Former teams: Stoney Creek Generals; Syracuse Crunch; San Antonio Rampage; Pingouins de Morzine-Avoriaz; Füchse Duisburg; Hannover Scorpions; Grizzly Adams Wolfsburg; Vienna Capitals
- NHL draft: Undrafted
- Playing career: 2002–present

Matt Dzieduszycki (born April 8, 1980 in Calgary, Alberta) is a Canadian former professional ice hockey centre who last played for the Stoney Creek Generals in the Senior men's Allan Cup Hockey.

== Playing career ==
Dzieduszycki turned pro in 2002, playing 66 games for the American Hockey League's Syracuse Crunch and 10 games for the ECHL's Dayton Bombers. In 2003, he moved to the San Antonio Rampage of the AHL and also had spells in the ECHL for the Augusta Lynx and the Louisiana IceGators during their run in the playoffs. Dzieduszycki returned to the Lynx before moving to the Las Vegas Wranglers and also had a brief spell in France's Ligue Magnus for HC Morzine-Avoriaz. He moved to Germany in 2006, signing for Füchse Duisburg before moving to the Hannover Scorpions in 2007.

On April 27, 2011, Dzieduszycki left the Scorpions after four seasons and signed a two-year contract to remain in Germany with Grizzly Adams Wolfsburg.

On June 15, 2015, as a free agent Dzieduszycki left Germany and signed in Austria, on a one-year contract with the Vienna Capitals of the EBEL.

== Career statistics ==
			Regular season					Playoffs
Season	Team	League	GP	G	A	Pts	PIM	GP	G	A	Pts	PIM
1996–97	Mississauga Chargers	OPJHL	50	27	30	57	36	—	—	—	—	—
1998–99	U. of New Hampshire	HE	29	2	6	8	34	—	—	—	—	—
1999–00	U. of New Hampshire	HE	5	1	2	3	12	—	—	—	—	—
1999–00	Barrie Colts	OHL	46	22	26	48	23	25	5	7	12	16
2000–01	Barrie Colts	OHL	45	33	30	63	49	5	2	0	2	4
2001–02	U. of Western Ontario	CIS	28	21	28	49	60	—	—	—	—	—
2001–02	Syracuse Crunch	AHL	4	0	0	0	0	—	—	—	—	—
2002–03	Dayton Bombers	ECHL	10	6	3	9	19	—	—	—	—	—
2002–03	Syracuse Crunch	AHL	66	12	10	22	38	—	—	—	—	—
2003–04	Augusta Lynx	ECHL	14	8	7	15	17	—	—	—	—	—
2003–04	San Antonio Rampage	AHL	60	3	12	15	34	—	—	—	—	—
2003–04	Louisiana IceGators	ECHL	—	—	—	—	—	6	1	2	3	4
2004–05	Augusta Lynx	ECHL	49	20	19	39	69	—	—	—	—	—
2004–05	Las Vegas Wranglers	ECHL	8	5	2	7	10	—	—	—	—	—
2005–06	Morzine-Avoriaz	FRA	7	3	3	6	26	—	—	—	—	—
2005–06	Las Vegas Wranglers	ECHL	68	34	44	78	123	12	4	5	9	31
2006–07	Füchse Duisburg	DEL	51	21	21	42	94	—	—	—	—	—
2007–08	Hannover Scorpions	DEL	51	11	26	37	73	3	1	1	2	6
2008–09	Hannover Scorpions	DEL	51	9	12	21	84	11	4	3	7	8
2009–10	Hannover Scorpions	DEL	50	21	17	38	90	11	3	5	8	4
2010–11	Hannover Scorpions	DEL	35	16	15	31	54	5	0	2	2	6
2011–12	Grizzly Adams Wolfsburg	DEL	41	15	22	37	50	—	—	—	—	—
2012–13	Grizzly Adams Wolfsburg	DEL	45	31	16	47	106	12	1	10	11	12
2013–14	Grizzly Adams Wolfsburg	DEL	13	7	7	14	18	8	2	4	6	6
2014–15	Grizzly Adams Wolfsburg	DEL	44	13	16	29	87	10	4	3	7	16
2015–16	Vienna Capitals	EBEL	50	15	21	36	83	5	0	1	1	4
DEL totals			381	144	152	296	656	60	15	28	43	58
