= Joey Sides =

- Born: 4 March 1986 (age 39) Sun Valley, Idaho, USA
- Height: 5 ft 11 in (180 cm)
- Weight: 185 lb (84 kg; 13 st 3 lb)
- Position: Forward
- Shot: left
- Played for: Wentworth Institute of Technology; Arizona Sundogs; Heerenveen Flyers; Colorado Eagles; St. John's IceCaps Rapid City Rush; Wichita Thunder; Reading Royals; Dundee Stars Tulsa Oilers; Kansas City Mavericks; Jacksonville Icemen
- Playing career: 2005–2022

Joey Sides is an American former professional ice hockey player.

During his journeyman career in various minor leagues in both the USA and Europe, he is one the first hockey players ever to wear a GoPro camera during a professional game. He also participated in the first professional ice hockey game at the Olympic Center in Lake Placid, New York (where the Miracle on Ice took place).

== Playing career ==
Sides attended Wentworth Institute of Technology from 2005 to 2009 where he played NCAA Division III college hockey. Playing both forward and defense he amassed 32 goals and 85 points in 90 collegiate games. As well as being appointed captain his sophomore through senior year.

On October 30, 2009, the Arizona Sundogs of the CHL announced they had signed Sides to play for their team.

After retirement, he remarked that the 2009 game against Wichita Thunder was particularly memorable, due to the smell of manure at the venue (due to a rodeo being held at the same venue shortly before) and a particularly large (10 000 people) and hostile crowd.

In 123 games played with the Sundogs, Sides tallied 98 points (44g, 54a).

In the 2011–12 season, Sides played overseas in the Netherlands for the Heerenveen Flyers where he scored 49pts (19g, 30a) in just 29 games before returning to North America to play with the Colorado Eagles of the ECHL, amounting 29 points (15g, 14a) in 29 games.

Sides was signed to an AHL contract in the off-season and attended camp with the St. John's IceCaps before being reassigned to the Eagles for the 2012–13 season. With Colorado in 18 games, Sides (9 goals, 9 assists) was tied for fourth place in scoring on the Eagles and tied for first place in the entire 23-team Premier “AA” ECHL in plus/minus ranking. He played 6 games with the St. Johns Ice Caps assisting on 2 goals and finished the season in Colorado with a total of 40 points (21g,19a) in 44 games.

On September 29, 2015, Sides agreed to terms on a one-year contract with the Wichita Thunder of the ECHL for the 2015–16 season. He later joined ECHL's Reading Royals to finish out the season.

On September 21, 2016, Sides agreed to join the Scottish team Dundee Stars of the Elite Ice Hockey League as the 8th forward for the 2016-17 season. He was sponsored by a hotel for the season. Anointed team captain, Sides compiled 35 points in just 43 games and despite a poor start to the season, it ended with a successful play-off run.

As a free agent, Sides opted to return to North America and the ECHL in securing a one-year deal with the Tulsa Oilers on August 24, 2017.

Since then he signed one year contracts for Kansas City Mavericks in September 2018, Rapid City Rush in September 2020, and finally in September 2021 with the Jacksonville Icemen.

== Style of play ==
Sides was described as a prolific goalscorer and fast skater as well as someone who amassed many penalty minutes.
