= Mikael Lidhammar =

Swedish ice hockey player

- Born: October 28, 1987 (age 37); Luleå, Sweden
- Height: 5 ft 10 in (178 cm)
- Weight: 185 lb (84 kg; 13 st 3 lb)
- Position: Left wing
- Shoots: Left
- Hockeyettan team: Bodens HF
- Playing career: 2006–present

Mikael Lidhammar (born October 28, 1987, in Luleå, Sweden) is a professional Swedish ice hockey winger currently playing with Bodens HF in the Swedish Hockeyettan. Lidhammar previously played for the Dundee Stars, Guildford Flames, ASC Corona Brasov and Glasgow Clan.
