= 2010 CIS University Cup =

2010 Cavendish CIS University Cup presented by TBay Tel
Tournament details
- Venue(s): Fort William Gardens, Thunder Bay, Ontario
- Dates: March 25–28, 2010
- Teams: 6

Final positions
- Champions: Saint Mary's Huskies (1st title)
- Runners-up: Alberta Golden Bears

Tournament statistics
- Games played: 7
- Attendance: 17,962 (2,566 per game)

Awards
- MVP: Andrew Hotham (Saint Mary's)

The 2010 CIS Men's University Cup Hockey Tournament (48th Annual) was held March 25–28, 2010. It was the second year of a two-year CIS Championship bid by Lakehead University and hosted at Fort William Gardens hockey rink. The UNB Varsity Reds would not be defending their title from 2009, despite a 27–1 record, as they lost in the second round of the AUS playoffs and did not advance.

Similar to previous years, going back to the introduction of the expanded format in 1998, the six invited teams were split into two Pools of three where each team plays the other(two games total). The best team in each Pool advances to the final. All pool games must be decided by a win, there are no ties. If a pool has a three-way tie for 1st (all teams have 1–1 records) than GF/GA differential among the tied teams is the first tie-breaker.

The Saint Mary's Huskies won their first Hockey title in school history with a dramatic 3–2 overtime win versus the #1 seed Alberta Golden Bears who were looking for their 14th.

== Road to the Cup ==
=== AUS playoffs ===
Quarterfinals
3	Saint Mary’s	2	4	—
6	Moncton	1	2	—
4	Prince Edward Island	2	2	—
5	St. Francis Xavier	3	3	—

Semifinals
1	New Brunswick	2	2	2	—	—
5	St. Francis Xavier	3	3	3	—	—
2	Acadia	2	2	1	2	—
3	Saint Mary’s	1	4	3	9	—

Championship
5	St. Francis Xavier	1	2	3	—	—
3	Saint Mary’s	7	3	5	—	—

Note: * denotes overtime period(s)

=== OUA playoffs ===
Division Quarterfinals; February 17–21
E1	Quebec–Trois-Rivières	6	4	—
E8	Concordia	2	2	—
E2	McGill	4	7	—
E7	Nipissing	1	2	—
East
E3	Toronto	0	1	—
E6	Ryerson	6	3	—
E4	Carleton	3	4	3**
E5	Queen's	4**	1	2
W1	Western Ontario	1	4	5
W8	Ontario Tech	2	2	1
W2	Waterloo	2	4	2
W7	Windsor	4	3	3**
West
W3	Lakehead	2	9	6
W6	York	3**	5	2
W4	Wilfrid Laurier	0	3	3
W5	Guelph	3	2	5

Division Semifinals; February 24–28
E1	Quebec–Trois-Rivières	6	6	—
E6	Ryerson	3	3	—
E2	McGill	2	5	6
E4	Carleton	5	1	2
W1	Western Ontario	5	3	—
W7	Windsor	2	1	—
W3	Lakehead	4*	5*	—
W5	Guelph	3	4	—

Division Finals; March 3–6
E1	Quebec–Trois-Rivières	2	4	—
E2	McGill	3	7	—
W1	Western Ontario	1	2	—
W3	Lakehead	4	5	—

Queen's Cup Final; March 13
E2	McGill	3
W3	Lakehead	1
Bronze Medal Game
E1	Quebec–Trois-Rivières	5
W1	Western Ontario	4

Note: * denotes overtime period(s)

=== Canada West playoffs ===
Semifinal
1	Alberta	5	3	—
4	Calgary	2	1	—
2	Saskatchewan	5	2	1
3	Manitoba	2	4	5

Championship
1	Alberta	1	2	4
3	Manitoba	4	1	2

Note: * denotes overtime period(s)

== University Cup ==
The six teams to advance to the tournament are listed below. The wild-card team was selected from the CW Conference as the AUS was provided the wild-card in 2009 and OUA teams are ineligible as they are the host conference. To avoid having Alberta and Manitoba in the same pool (Pool A seeds 1–4–6), Manitoba must be seeded 5th, which leaves Lakehead and UQTR in 4th and 6th respectively.

Rank	Seed	Team	Qualification	Record	Appearance	Last
1	1	Alberta Golden Bears	West: Canada West Champion	27–5–1	34th	2009
5	2	McGill Redmen	Quebec: OUA Champion	31–3–2	4th	2009
8	3	Saint Mary's Huskies	Atlantic: AUS Champion	24–9–4	11th	2009
7	4	Lakehead Thunderwolves	Host: OUA Runner-up	25–9–2	5th	2009
NR	5	Manitoba Bisons	Wild-card: Canada West Runner-up	19–13–2	6th	2005
3	6	Quebec–Trois-Rivières Patriotes	Ontario: OUA Third place	28–5–1	16th	2007

=== Pool A – Evening ===
Seed	Team
1	Alberta Golden Bears
4	Lakehead Thunderwolves
6	UQTR Patriotes

Day	Game	Home	Visitor	Score
Thursday	2	#6 UQTR Patriotes	#1 Alberta Golden Bears	2–4
Friday	4	#4 Lakehead Thunderwolves	#6 UQTR Patriotes	7–2
Saturday	6	#1 Alberta Golden Bears	#4 Lakehead Thunderwolves	5–3

Team	GP	W	L	GF	GA	DIF	PTS
Alberta Golden Bears	2	2	0	9	5	+4	4
Lakehead Thunderwolves	2	1	1	10	7	+3	2
UQTR Patriotes	2	0	2	4	11	–7	0

=== Pool B – Afternoon ===
Seed	Team
2	McGill Redmen
3	Saint Mary's Huskies
5	Manitoba Bisons

Day	Game	Home	Visitor	Score
Thursday	1	#5 Manitoba Bisons	#2 McGill Redmen	4–5 OT
Friday	3	#2 McGill Redmen	#3 Saint Mary's Huskies	2–4
Saturday	5	#3 Saint Mary's Huskies	#5 Manitoba Bisons	5–0

Team	GP	W	L	GF	GA	DIF	PTS
Saint Mary's Huskies	2	2	0	9	2	+7	4
Manitoba Bisons	2	1	1	5	9	–4	2
McGill Redmen	2	0	2	6	9	–3	0

== Championship final ==
March 28, 2010; 7:00 PM (EST); Rogers Sportsnet	#1 Alberta Golden Bears (H)	2–3 OT1 (1–0, 0–1, 1–1, 0–1)	#3 Saint Mary's Huskies (V)	Fort William Gardens, Thunder Bay; Attendance: 2,366

Game reference

Travis Yonkman (2–1–0)
Goalies
Neil Conway (3–0–0)
Referee:
Dave Lewis
Linesmen:
Jesse Wilmot
Matt Traub

T. Metcalfe (D. Price, I. McDonald) – 14:21	1–0
	1–1	30:37 – C. Fergus (C. Thornton, M. Rancourt)
	1–2	43:36 – A. Hotham (K. Doucet)
D. Ryan (I. Barteaux, C. Klassen) – 55:17	2–2
	2–3	69:13 – B. Smith (M. Rancourt, R. Rorabeck)

5 for 10 min
Penalties
5 for 18 min
(12, 11, 11, 6) – 40
Shots
26 – (5, 8, 9, 4)

== Tournament All-Stars ==
Andrew Hotham, a defenseman from the Saint Mary's Huskies, was selected as the Major W.J. 'Danny' McLeod Award for CIS University Cup MVP. He was tied in tournament scoring with 5 points (two goals and three assists) with teammate Cody Thornton. Andrew was Saint Mary's MVP in their second game versus Manitoba and had the team's second goal in the championship final.

Joining Hotham on the tournament all-star team were:

- Goaltender: Neil Conway, Saint Mary's
- Defenceman: Ian Barteaux, Alberta
- Forward: Cody Thornton, Saint Mary's
- Forward: Cam Fergus, Saint Mary's
- Forward: Chad Klassen, Alberta
