= Ryan O'Marra =

Japanese-born Canadian ice hockey player

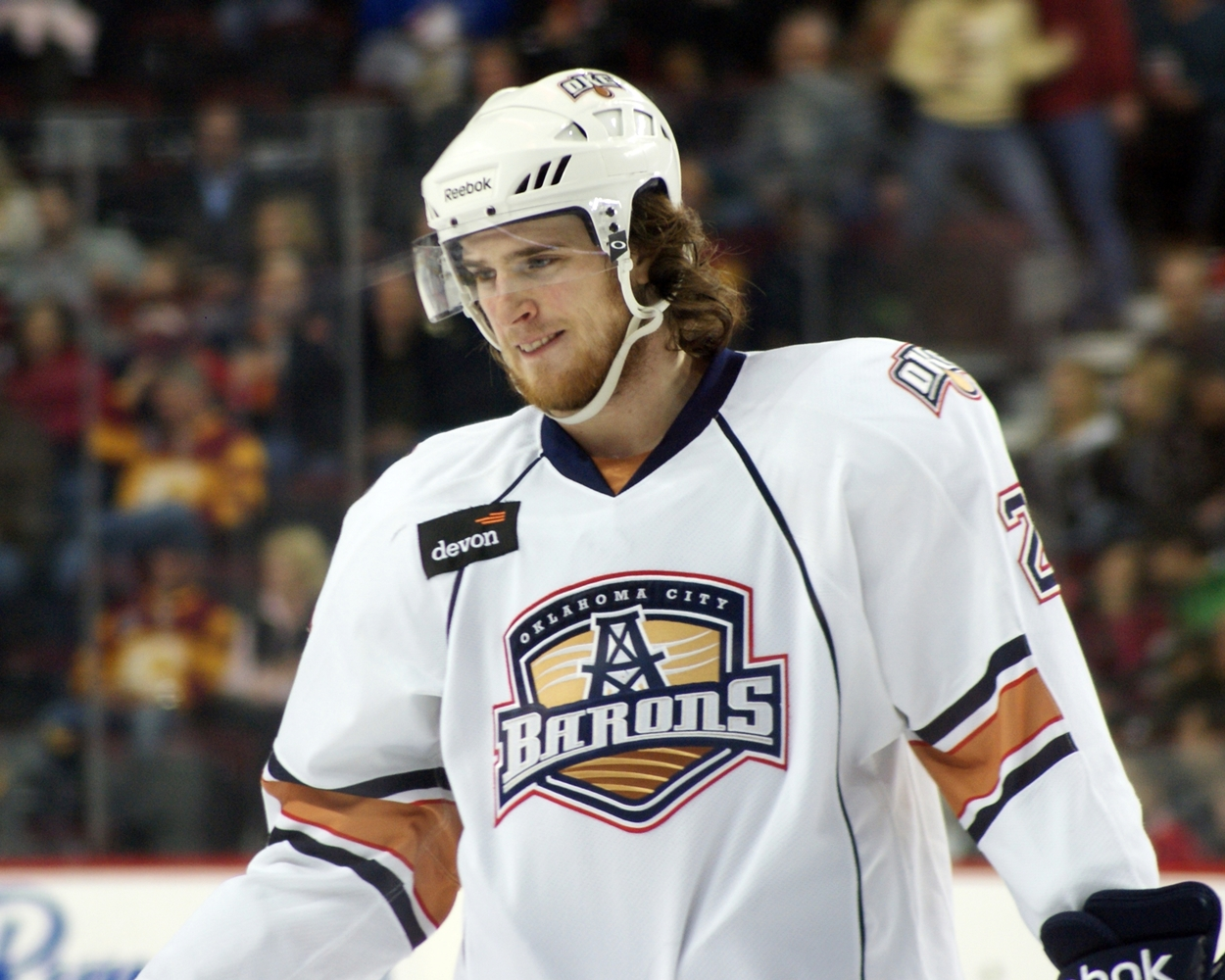
- O'Marra with the Oklahoma City Barons in 2011
- Born: June 9, 1987 (age 39) Tokyo, Japan
- Height: 6 ft 2 in (188 cm)
- Weight: 220 lb (100 kg; 15 st 10 lb)
- Position: Centre
- Shot: Right
- ACH team Former teams: Stoney Creek Generals; Edmonton Oilers; Anaheim Ducks; Lahti Pelicans; HC Fassa; Vålerenga; HC Pustertal Wölfe; Coventry Blaze
- NHL draft: 15th overall, 2005; New York Islanders
- Playing career: 2006–2018

Ryan O'Marra (born June 9, 1987) is a Canadian former professional ice hockey player. O'Marra played professionally from 2006 until 2018. A first-round pick of the New York Islanders of the National Hockey League (NHL), O'Marra played 33 games in the NHL and finished his career playing in European leagues. He is the only person born in Japan to have scored a goal in the NHL.

== Early life ==
O'Marra was born to Irish Canadian parents in Tokyo, Japan, and moved to Canada when he was one year old. O'Marra was also a student at Athabasca University.

== Playing career ==
=== Amateur ===
O'Marra attended Mentor College Primary School and Lorne Park Secondary School both in Mississauga, Ontario. As a minor ice hockey player in his youth, he participated in the 2000 and 2001 Quebec International Pee-Wee Hockey Tournaments with the North York Rangers, and the Toronto Marlboros teams.

O'Marra played three seasons in the Ontario Hockey League (OHL) for the Erie Otters. In two seasons with the Otters, he has earned 95 points (41 goals and 54 assists) in 127 regular season games. He has also scored 15 points (nine goals and six assists) in 15 playoff games with the Otters. O'Marra was then drafted in the first round, 15th overall, by the New York Islanders in the 2005 NHL entry draft. He became the first Japanese-born Canadian player selected in the first round of an NHL entry draft.

=== Professional ===
On March 30, 2006, at the conclusion of the 2005–06 season, O'Marra was signed to a three-year contract by the New York Islanders. He then joined the Islanders' American Hockey League (AHL) affiliate, the Bridgeport Sound Tigers, scoring two goals in his professional debut.

O'Marra was then returned to the Otters for his final junior-eligible season, in 2006–07. The Otters got off to a slow start, and he was traded to the Saginaw Spirit in late November in exchange for promising centre Zack Torquato. On February 27, 2007, O'Marra's NHL rights were dealt in a trade to the Edmonton Oilers, along with Robert Nilsson and the Islanders' first-round draft pick in the 2007 (Alex Plante), in exchange for Ryan Smyth.

After two difficult seasons with the Oilers' minor league affiliates, the Springfield Falcons and Stockton Thunder, O'Marra made his NHL debut with Edmonton in the 2009–10 season. He played six minutes and was a –1 plus-minus in a game against the Ottawa Senators on November 10, 2009. O'Marra later recorded his first career NHL point on an assist of a Colin McDonald goal against the Vancouver Canucks, on November 28; the goal was also McDonald's first career NHL point. O'Marra scored his first career NHL goal on December 26, 2010, against Cory Schneider of the Canucks. On March 17, 2011, due to multiple injuries to Oilers players, O'Marra was again recalled to the NHL, along with fellow Oklahoma City Barons – Edmonton's new AHL affiliate – teammates Alexandre Giroux and Chris VandeVelde.

During the following season, 2011–12, O'Marra was traded to the Anaheim Ducks in exchange for Bryan Rodney on February 16, 2012.

On July 27, 2012, with the impending 2012–13 NHL lockout, O'Marra signed his first European contract on a one-year deal with Lahti Pelicans of the Finnish SM-liiga. However, after only eight games into the 2012–13 season and enduring a diminished role within the roster, O'Marra was mutually released from his contract on October 4, 2012. O'Marra then played nine games for HC Fassa in the Italian Serie A in the regular season before moving to Vålerenga in Norway for the rest of the regular season and playoffs. With Vålerenga, he had seven goals and six assists for 13 points in 15 games in the playoffs.

After playing one season in Italy with Val Pusteria HC, O'Marra signed with Elite Ice Hockey League (EIHL) team Coventry Blaze in the United Kingdom for the 2014–15 season. After playing one season with the Blaze, O'Marra announced his retirement from professional ice hockey on March 26, 2015.

He continued to play hockey in Alberta at the senior men's level with the Stoney Creek Generals of the Allan Cup Hockey.

== International play ==
Medal record

Representing Canada

Ice hockey

World Junior Championships
Gold medal – first place	2006 Vancouver	
Gold medal – first place	2007 Mora	

IIHF U18 Championships
Silver medal – second place	2005 České Budějovice	

O'Marra played in his first international tournament with Canada Ontario in the 2004 World U-17 Hockey Challenge, defeating Canada Pacific to earn the gold medal. He then won a gold medal as the alternate captain for Team Canada at the 2004 U-18 Junior World Cup. He also played on the Canadian under-18 team that finished with a silver medal at the 2005 IIHF World U18 Championships in Plzeň, Czech Republic.

O'Marra was selected and played a part of the consecutive gold medal-winning Canadian teams at the 2006 and 2007 World Junior Ice Hockey Championships.

== Career statistics ==
=== Regular season and playoffs ===
			Regular season					Playoffs
Season	Team	League	GP	G	A	Pts	PIM	GP	G	A	Pts	PIM
2002–03	Georgetown Raiders	OPJHL	3	0	2	2	0	—	—	—	—	—
2002–03	Streetsville Derbys	OPJHL	6	0	1	1	2	—	—	—	—	—
2003–04	Erie Otters	OHL	63	16	16	32	68	9	5	5	10	6
2004–05	Erie Otters	OHL	64	25	38	63	60	6	4	1	5	0
2005–06	Erie Otters	OHL	61	27	50	77	134	—	—	—	—	—
2005–06	Bridgeport Sound Tigers	AHL	8	4	1	5	4	3	0	1	1	2
2006–07	Erie Otters	OHL	13	8	6	14	26	—	—	—	—	—
2006–07	Saginaw Spirit	OHL	33	18	19	37	48	3	2	1	3	4
2007–08	Springfield Falcons	AHL	31	2	7	9	31	—	—	—	—	—
2007–08	Stockton Thunder	ECHL	24	11	9	20	45	6	2	7	9	10
2008–09	Springfield Falcons	AHL	62	1	9	10	49	—	—	—	—	—
2009–10	Springfield Falcons	AHL	74	12	6	18	59	—	—	—	—	—
2009–10	Edmonton Oilers	NHL	3	0	1	1	0	—	—	—	—	—
2010–11	Edmonton Oilers	NHL	21	1	4	5	13	—	—	—	—	—
2010–11	Oklahoma City Barons	AHL	53	2	20	22	49	6	0	2	2	0
2011–12	Oklahoma City Barons	AHL	40	8	9	17	58	—	—	—	—	—
2011–12	Edmonton Oilers	NHL	7	0	1	1	4	—	—	—	—	—
2011–12	Syracuse Crunch	AHL	18	1	2	3	29	4	0	2	2	0
2011–12	Anaheim Ducks	NHL	2	0	0	0	0	—	—	—	—	—
2012–13	Pelicans	SM-l	8	0	1	1	8	—	—	—	—	—
2012–13	HC Fassa	ITA	9	6	7	13	12	—	—	—	—	—
2012–13	Vålerenga	NOR	9	2	6	8	16	15	7	6	13	60
2013–14	HC Pustertal Wölfe	ITA	37	11	15	26	85	14	0	8	8	8
2014–15	Coventry Blaze	EIHL	47	15	23	38	68	4	1	4	5	2
2015–16	Stoney Creek Generals	ACH	12	6	10	16	12	6	2	6	8	6
2016–17	Stoney Creek Generals	ACH	15	9	10	19	6	9	6	4	10	6
2017–18	Stoney Creek Generals	AC	—	—	—	—	—	5	1	2	3	6
AHL totals			286	30	54	84	279	13	0	5	5	2
NHL totals			33	1	6	7	17	—	—	—	—	—

=== International ===
Year	Team	Event	Result	GP	G	A	Pts	PIM
2004	Canada Ontario	U17	1st place, gold medalist(s)	6	3	4	7	8
2004	Canada	U18	1st place, gold medalist(s)	5	3	2	5	20
2005	Canada	WJC18	2nd place, silver medalist(s)	6	5	0	5	12
2006	Canada	WJC	1st place, gold medalist(s)	6	0	2	2	18
2007	Canada	WJC	1st place, gold medalist(s)	6	0	2	2	8
Junior totals				29	11	10	21	66

Preceded by Petteri Nokelainen	New York Islanders first round pick 2005	Succeeded by Kyle Okposo
