= David Rutherford (ice hockey) =

Canadian ice hockey player

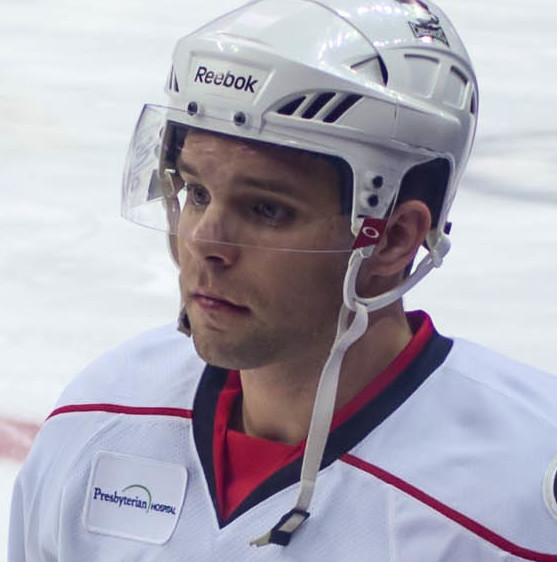
- Born: 30 April 1987 (age 38) Ladner, BC, Canada
- Height: 5 ft 7 in (170 cm)
- Weight: 179 lb (81 kg; 12 st 11 lb)
- Position: Forward
- Shoots: Right
- Played for: Charlotte Checkers; Phoenix RoadRunners; Bossier-Shreveport Mudbugs; Florida Everblades; Charlotte Checkers; Orlando Solar Bears; Arizona Sundogs; Missouri Mavericks; Ontario Reign; Edinburgh Capitals; Belfast Giants; DEAC; Diables Rouges de Briançon
- NHL draft: Undrafted
- Playing career: 2008–present

David Rutherford (born 30 April 1987) is a Canadian professional ice hockey forward who last played for Diables Rouges de Briançon in the Ligue Magnus. Rutherford was previously with the Belfast Giants of the Elite Ice Hockey League (EIHL).

== Playing career ==
Rutherford played Junior Hockey in the PJHL, BCHL, and WHL. He played for the Abbotsford Pilots in the PJHL, the Penticton Panthers, Chilliwack Chiefs, and Surrey Eagles in the BCHL, and the Vancouver Giants and Spokane Chiefs in the WHL.

Rutherford began his professional ice hockey career with the Charlotte Checkers of the ECHL during the 2008–09 season and Phoenix RoadRunners, before being traded to the Phoenix RoadRunners on 13 March 2009, along with Peter-James Corsi and Brian Deeth in exchange for Steve Ward and future considerations.

On 7 December 2009, Rutherford signed with the Bossier-Shreveport Mudbugs of the Central Hockey League, for which he would play for the 2009–10 season and 2010–11 season. Rutherford won the Ray Miron President's Cup championship with the Mudbugs for the 2010–11 season. On 26 July 2011, Rutherford returned to the ECHL by signing with the Florida Everblades.

On 6 August 2012, Rutherford signed a two-way AHL/ECHL contract with the Charlotte Checkers of the American Hockey League, which coincidentally was affiliated with Rutherford's prior team, the Florida Everblades. Rutherford split the 2012–13 season between the Checkers and Everblades, accumulating 38 points on 16 goals and 22 assists in 36 games with the Everblades, while accumulating 7 points with 1 goal and 6 assists in 18 games with the Checkers.

On 19 August 2013, Rutherford left the Everblades and signed with the Orlando Solar Bears of the ECHL.

On 28 December 2013, Rutherford was traded to the Fort Wayne Komets in exchange for Mickey Lang. He refused to report, however, and then signed with the Arizona Sundogs of the CHL.

On 18 June 2014, Rutherford signed with Visby/Roma HK of Hockeyettan, but was released by the team on 14 September 2014. On 9 October 2014, Rutherford signed with the Missouri Mavericks of the ECHL. On 22 January 2014, Rutherford was traded to the Ontario Reign of the ECHL in exchange for Right Wing Geoff Walker.

On 17 August 2015, Rutherford signed his first contract abroad agreeing to a one-year contract with Scottish club Edinburgh Capitals of the Elite Ice Hockey League.

Rutherford left Edinburgh in January 2016, signing for Belfast Giants. Rutherford later agreed an extension to remain with the team for the 2016–17 season.

In July 2017, Rutherford announced his retirement from hockey. However, in November 2017, Rutherford reversed his decision and re-signed with Belfast until the end of the 2017/18 season. Rutherford remained in Belfast until the end of the 2018/19 season, before signing for Hungarian side DEAC of the Erste Liga in October 2019.

For the 2020/21 season, Rutherford moved to France to sign for Ligue Magnus side Diables Rouges de Briançon.

== Career statistics ==
			Regular season					Playoffs
Season	Team	League	GP	G	A	Pts	PIM	GP	G	A	Pts	PIM
2003–04	Penticton Panthers	BCHL	6	0	0	0	0	—	—	—	—	—
2003–04	Chilliwack Chiefs	BCHL	6	2	2	4	2	—	—	—	—	—
2004–05	Surrey Eagles	BCHL	48	25	30	55	98	26	10	7	17	54
2004–05	Vancouver Giants	WHL	1	0	0	0	0	—	—	—	—	—
2005–06	Vancouver Giants	WHL	41	4	6	10	44	—	—	—	—	—
2006–07	Spokane Chiefs	WHL	69	31	27	58	133	6	2	0	2	13
2007–08	Spokane Chiefs	WHL	52	22	21	43	65	21	9	9	18	12
2008–09	Charlotte Checkers	ECHL	52	13	13	26	89	—	—	—	—	—
2008–09	Phoenix RoadRunners	ECHL	12	6	4	10	22	—	—	—	—	—
2009–10	Bossier-Shreveport Mudbugs	CHL	41	18	20	38	62	11	2	4	6	8
2010–11	Bossier-Shreveport Mudbugs	CHL	58	35	32	67	70	20	12	10	22	29
2011–12	Florida Everblades	ECHL	57	25	30	55	65	17	5	7	12	16
2012–13	Florida Everblades	ECHL	35	16	22	38	58	13	5	6	11	22
2012–13	Charlotte Checkers	AHL	18	1	6	7	12	—	—	—	—	—
2013–14	Orlando Solar Bears	ECHL	21	6	3	9	32	—	—	—	—	—
2013–14	Arizona Sundogs	CHL	27	14	20	34	41	11	2	11	13	18
2014–15	Missouri Mavericks	ECHL	35	6	14	20	49	—	—	—	—	—
2014–15	Ontario Reign	ECHL	22	8	15	23	10	15	4	7	11	10
2015–16	Edinburgh Capitals	EIHL	25	14	12	26	51	—	—	—	—	—
2015–16	Belfast Giants	EIHL	15	3	9	12	20	2	0	0	0	0
2016–17	Belfast Giants	EIHL	41	19	24	43	58	2	0	2	2	0
2017–18	Belfast Giants	EIHL	31	17	23	40	18	2	1	1	2	0
2018–19	Belfast Giants	EIHL	54	18	39	57	57	—	—	—	—	—
2019–20	DEAC	Erste Liga	10	7	5	12	6	1	0	0	0	0
2020–21	Diables Rouges de Briançon	Ligue Magnus	3	1	0	1	27	—	—	—	—	—
AHL totals			18	1	6	7	12	—	—	—	—	—
ECHL totals			234	80	101	181	325	45	14	20	34	48
EIHL totals			166	71	107	178	204	6	1	3	4	0
