= Ben Bowns =

English ice hockey player (born 1991)

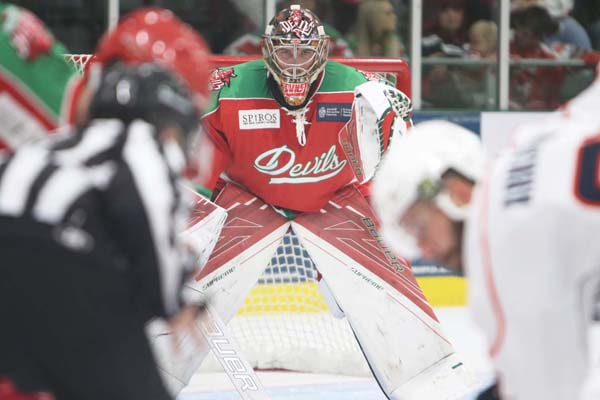
- Bowns with the Cardiff Devils in 2016
- Born: 21 January 1991 (age 35) Rotherham, Yorkshire, England
- Height: 6 ft 2 in (188 cm)
- Weight: 212 lb (96 kg; 15 st 2 lb)
- Position: Goaltender
- Caught: Left
- EIHL team Former teams: Cardiff Devils; Sheffield Scimitars; Sheffield Steeldogs; Hull Stingrays; Graz99ers; Nottingham Panthers; HK Dukla Trenčín
- National team: Great Britain
- Playing career: 2006–2026

Ben Bowns (born 21 January 1991) is English professional ice hockey player who is a goaltender for the Cardiff Devils of the Elite Ice Hockey League.

== Playing career ==
Bowns played youth hockey in Sheffield, before signing with the Hull Stingrays in 2012. He would play two years as the starter in Hull before signing in Cardiff in 2014.

With the Devils, he won the EIHL Challenge Cup twice and has been named goaltender of the year three times. Despite receiving offers from other European leagues, remained in Cardiff until 2020.

On 14 August 2020 it was confirmed Bowns had departed Cardiff for IceHL side Graz 99ers. Bowns had played against Graz twice in the 2019–20 Champions Hockey League, helping Cardiff to two wins over the 99ers.

In March 2021, Bowns was drafted by EIHL side Nottingham Panthers ahead of the 2021 Elite Series.

On 16 June 2021 it was announced Bowns had signed to a second contract abroad after agreeing to join Slovak Extraliga side HK Dukla Trenčín for the 2021–22 season.

After two seasons abroad, Bowns returned to the UK and to a second spell with Cardiff – re-signing in May 2022 ahead of the 2022–23 season.

In February 2023, Bowns was credited with a goal in Cardiff's 4–1 victory at the Dundee Stars, as he was the last Devils player to touch the puck prior to the Stars' Johan Eriksson putting it into his own net. As a result, he became the fourth goaltender to be credited with such an achievement in British league ice hockey, after Tony Melia, Jody Lehman and Mark Bernard.

In June 2025, Bowns re-signed with Cardiff, bringing his total time with the team to 10 years.

== International play ==
Bowns made his first appearance for the British senior team in 2012, and has played as the country's starter ever since. In 2019, Britain made the IIHF Men's World Championship for the first time in 25 years, where Bowns was named player of the match after making 59 saves in a 6-3 loss to the USA. He finished the tournament as the goalie with the most saves. Bowns again represented Great Britain at the 2021 IIHF World Championship, finishing with a save percentage of 91%.

In late April to early May 2023, Bowns was Great Britain's starting netminder for the IIHF World Championship division 1A tournament in Nottingham. He played all five games in the tournament and was awarded netminder of the tournament with a save percentage of 93.46%, a goal against average of 1.39 and 3 shutouts against Korea, Romania and Lithuania. Team GB was promoted to the 2024 World Championship in Czechia after winning all 5 games.

Bowns would compete in the 2024 IIHF World Championship he finished the tournament with a 88.3 SV% and a 4.67 GAA.Great Britain's only win 4-2 over Austria Ben was between the pipes.

In 2025 Bowns would help GB to Gold and Promotion from Division 1A. He was named as one of GB's three Stars of the tournament.

== Personal life ==
Bowns has named former NHL goalie Patrick Roy as his favourite player growing up.
