= Andrew Hotham =

Canadian ice hockey player

- Born: August 29, 1986 (age 39) Barrie, Ontario, Canada
- Height: 6 ft 2 in (188 cm)
- Weight: 185 lb (84 kg; 13 st 3 lb)
- Position: Defence
- Shoots: Left
- ACH team Former teams: Brantford Blast; Rochester Americans; WBS Penguins; Oklahoma City Barons; Düsseldorfer EG; Cardiff Devils; Stoney Creek Generals
- NHL draft: Undrafted
- Playing career: 2011–present

Andrew Hotham (born August 29, 1986) is a Canadian professional ice hockey defenceman. He previously played four seasons with the Welsh EIHL team Cardiff Devils, claiming five trophies and four EIHL defenseman of the year awards. His father Greg (over 200 NHL games) and elder brother Scott also played the sport professionally.

== Career ==
Following four seasons in the Ontario Hockey League (OHL), Hotham attended Saint Mary's University in Nova Scotia. In university, he played for the Canadian Interuniversity Sport (CIS) Saint Mary's Huskies from 2007–08 to 2010–11; the Huskies won the 2010 CIS University Cup championship, with Hotham winning the Major W.J. "Danny" McLeod Award as Most Valuable Player of the national championship tournament. During his university career, he was named three times to the CIS All-Canadian First Team (2009, 2010 and 2011).

In the days following his spring 2011 graduation from university, Hotham signed with the Rochester Americans of the American Hockey League (AHL), playing in six games at the end of the 2010–11 AHL season. He played with the Wheeling Nailers of the ECHL for the 2011–12 ECHL season, and was called up for two games with the associated Wilkes-Barre/Scranton Penguins of the AHL. He spent the start of the 2012–13 ECHL season with the Cincinnati Cyclones, then returned to the Wheeling Nailers for 17 games, who then loaned him to AHL's Oklahoma City Barons, where he helped the Barons advance to the Western Conference finals in the Calder Cup playoffs.

On June 23, 2013, Hotham signed his first European contract on a one-year deal with Düsseldorfer EG of the DEL.

Andrew Hotham moved to the UK ahead of the 2014/15 season to sign for EIHL side Cardiff Devils. Incidentally, Hotham played alongside his brother Scott during the 2016/17 season, Andrew's third season with the team, with the pair helping the Devils to a league and cup double. Andrew also claimed the EIHL player of the year award for 2016/17.

Hothan has since gone on to play for Ontario-based ACH sides Stoney Creek Generals and Brantford Blast.

== Awards and honours ==
Award	Year
CIS First-Team All-Canadian	2008–09
CIS First-Team All-Canadian	2009–10
Major W.J. 'Danny' McLeod Award - CIS University Cup MVP	2009–10
CIS First-Team All-Canadian	2010–11
CIS Defenceman of the year	2010–11
ECHL All-Rookie Team	2011–12
EIHL Defenceman of the Year	2014-15
EIHL Defenceman of the Year	2015-16
EIHL Defenceman of the Year	2016-17
EIHL Player of the Year	2016-17
