= Boden Hockey =

Bodens Hockey
- City: Boden, Sweden
- League: Division 1 as of 2020–21
- Founded: 3 December 2005
- Home arena: Björknäshallen
- Colors: Red
- Website: http://www.bodenhockey.se

Boden Hockey, actually Bodens Hockeyförening or Bodens HF, is an ice hockey team in Boden, Sweden. They currently play in Division 1, the third level of ice hockey in Sweden. Their home arena is Björknäshallen. The club was founded on 3 December 2005 as the successor club to Bodens IK, which had gone into insolvency and folded two days earlier.
