= Johan Eriksson (ice hockey) =

Swedish ice hockey player

- Born: May 28, 1993 (age 31); Sweden
- Height: 6 ft 1 in (185 cm)
- Weight: 190 lb (86 kg; 13 st 8 lb)
- Position: Forward
- Shoots: Right
- Oberliga team Former teams: IceFighters Leipzig; Brynäs IF; Tingsryds AIF; Modo Hockey; Almtuna IS; Guildford Flames; Dundee Stars
- NHL draft: Undrafted
- Playing career: 2013–present

Johan Eriksson (born May 28, 1993) is a Swedish ice hockey player who currently plays for German Oberliga side IceFighters Leipzig. Eriksson last iced with Elite Ice Hockey League sides Fife Flyers, Dundee Stars and Guildford Flames. He made his Elitserien debut playing with Brynäs IF during the 2012–13 Elitserien season.
