= Mark Derlago =

Canadian ice hockey player

Mark Nicholas Derlago
- Born: January 17, 1986 (age 39); Brandon, Manitoba, Canada
- Height: 5 ft 11 in (180 cm)
- Weight: 197 lb (89 kg; 14 st 1 lb)
- Position: Left wing
- Shot: Left
- Played for: Manitoba Moose; Providence Bruins; Texas Stars; Anyang Halla; Aalborg Pirates; Esbjerg Energy; Nikko Icebucks; Nottingham Panthers
- NHL draft: Undrafted
- Playing career: 2007–2019

Mark Derlago (born January 17, 1986) is a Canadian retired professional ice hockey left winger.

Before joining Halla, Derlago played for the Texas Stars, Manitoba Moose, and the Providence Bruins of the AHL, and was a member of the Idaho Steelheads and Bakersfield Condors of the ECHL. Derlago also played for the Lausitzer Füchse in Germany prior to joining Halla.

After spells with Anyang Halla and Nikko Icebucks in the ALIH as well as in Denmark with Aalborg Pirates and Esbjerg Energy, Derlago moved to the UK to sign for Nottingham Panthers on 19 July 2017.

Since ending his playing career, he has become an assistant coach for the Brandon Wheat Kings in the Western Hockey League (WHL).

== Awards and honours ==
- WHL Most Goals with 46 (2006–07)
- ECHL Performer of the Year (2009–10)
- ECHL First All-Star Team (2009–10)
- ECHL First All-Star Team (2010–11)
