= Stoney Creek Generals =

Canadian senior ice hockey team

- City: Stoney Creek, Ontario
- League: Allan Cup Hockey
- Founded: 2013
- Folded: 2019
- Home arena: Gateway Ice Centre
- Colours: Blue, Red, and White

Franchise history
- 2013-2019: Stoney Creek Generals
- 2019-2022: Brantford Blast

The Stoney Creek Generals were a Canadian senior ice hockey team playing out of Gateway Ice Centre in Stoney Creek, Ontario. In 2013, the Stoney Creek Generals joined the Ontario Hockey Association's Allan Cup Hockey League and began operations. The Stoney Creek Generals won the J. Ross Robertson Cup as the league's playoffs champions in four consecutive seasons from 2016 to 2019.

== Season-by-season record ==
Note: GP = Games Played, W = Wins, L = Losses, T = Ties, OTL = Overtime Losses, SOL = Shootout Losses, Pts = Points, GF = Goals for, GA = Goals against, PIM = Penalties in minutes

| Season | GP | W | L | OTL | SOL | Pts | GF | GA | PIM |
| 2013–14 | 24 | 14 | 8 | 1 | 1 | 30 | 122 | 117 | 327 |
| Playoffs 2014 | 4 | - | 4 | - | - | - | 12 | 29 | 79 |
| 2014–15 | 24 | 15 | 9 | - | - | 30 | 126 | 126 | 729 |
| Playoffs 2015 | 5 | 1 | 4 | - | - | 2 | 20 | 27 | 108 |
| 2015–16 | 24 | 18 | 4 | 2 | - | 55 | 168 | 92 | 400 |
| Playoffs 2016 | 9 | 8 | 1 | - | - | 16 | 45 | 27 | 171 |
| 2016–17 | 24 | 18 | 4 | 2 | - | 55 | 152 | 89 | 417 |
| Playoffs 2017 | 9 | 8 | 1 | - | - | 16 | 50 | 23 | 136 |

Source: pointstreak.com

== Awards ==
- 2015/2016 - Regular Season Champions
- 2015/2016 - ACH Awards - Leading Scorer: Mike Ruberto
- 2015/2016 - Robertson Cup Champions
- 2016/2017 - November 2016 Player of the Month: Matthew Dzieduszycki
- 2016/2017 - Regular Season Champions
- 2016/2017 - ACH Awards - Best Defenceman Award: Sean Blanchard
- 2016/2017 - ACH Awards - Best Individual Goaltender Award: Daniel Svedin
- 2016/2017 - ACH Awards - Best Goaltending Award: Daniel Svedin, Matthew Sagrott & David Brown
- 2016/2017 - Robertson Cup Champions

== Notable players ==
- Sean Blanchard
- Dave Brown
- Justin Donati
- Tyler Donati
- Matt Dzieduszycki
- Kellan Lain
- Stefan Legein
- David Ling
- Ryan O'Marra
- Justin Sawyer
