= Michal Zajkowski =

Polish-born Swedish ice hockey player

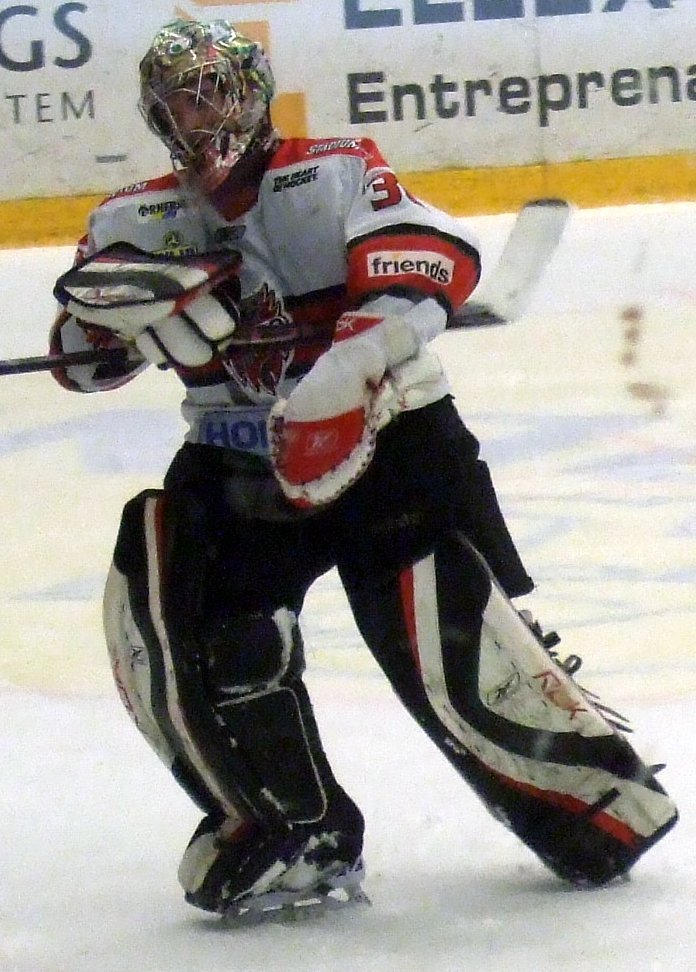
- Born: July 11, 1983 (age 41); Łódź, POL
- Height: 5 ft 9 in (175 cm)
- Weight: 176 lb (80 kg; 12 st 8 lb)
- Position: Goaltender
- Catches: Left
- team Former teams: Free Agent; Örebro HK; Modo Hockey; Piteå HC; IF Sundsvall; IF Björklöven; Tingsryds AIF; IK Oskarshamn; Brûleurs de Loups; Lillehammer IK; Braehead Clan; Örnsköldsviks HF
- Playing career: 2004–present

Michal Adrian Zajkowski (born 11 July 1983) is an ice hockey Goaltender who is currently a free agent. He last played for Örnsköldsviks HF in the Hockeyettan. He was born in Łódź, Poland, and moved to Sweden when he was six years old.
