= 2011 Kelly Cup playoffs =

Tournament details
- Dates: April 4–May 21, 2011
- Teams: 15

Final positions
- Champions: Alaska Aces
- Runners-up: Kalamazoo Wings

Tournament statistics
- Scoring leader(s): Trent Daavettila (Kalamazoo) (28 points)

The 2011 Kelly Cup Playoffs of the ECHL started on April 4, 2011 following the end of the 2010–11 ECHL regular season. The playoff format remains unchanged from that of the 2010 postseason, with the exception of the changed conference names. 15 teams will qualify for the playoffs, being the top seven teams from the Western Conference and the top eight teams from the Eastern Conference.

== Playoff format ==
In the Eastern Conference, postseason berths will be awarded to the first-place team in each division and the next five teams in the conference, based on points. The division winners will be seeded first, second and third and will play the eighth-place finisher, the seventh-place finisher and the sixth-place finisher, respectively, while the fourth-place finisher and the fifth-place finisher will meet. The conference semifinals will have the winner of the first-place and eighth-place matchup will meet the winner of the fourth-place and fifth-place game while the winner of the second-place and seventh-place game will face the winner of the third-place and sixth-place matchup.

In the Western Conference, postseason berths will be awarded to the first-place team in each division and the next five teams in the conference, based on points. The division winner with the best record in the conference will receive a bye in the first round. The other division winner will be seeded second and meet the team that finishes seventh in the conference in the first round. The other first round matchups will be the third-place finisher in the conference against the sixth-place finisher in the conference and the fourth-place finisher in the conference against the fifth-place finisher in the conference. The conference semifinals will have the first-place finisher meeting the winner of the fourth-place and fifth-place matchup and the winner of the second-place finisher and seventh-place finisher against the winner of the third-place finisher against the sixth-place finisher.

The first round in each Conference will be a best of five series with each subsequent round being a best of seven series.

== Playoff seeds ==
After the regular season, 15 teams qualified for the playoffs. The Alaska Aces were the Western Conference regular season champions and the Brabham Cup winners with the best record at 97 points. The Greenville Road Warriors earned the top seed in the Eastern Conference and finished the season with 96 points.

=== Eastern Conference ===
1. Greenville Road Warriors - South Division and Eastern Conference champions, 96 points.
2. Reading Royals - Atlantic Division champions, 93 points.
3. Kalamazoo Wings - North Division champions, 88 points.
4. Wheeling Nailers - 81 points.
5. South Carolina Stingrays - 80 points.
6. Florida Everblades - 79 points.
7. Cincinnati Cyclones - 76 points.
8. Elmira Jackals - 74 points.

=== Western Conference ===
1. Alaska Aces - Western Conference and Mountain Division champions, Brabham Cup winner, 97 points.
2. Bakersfield Condors - Pacific Division champions, 86 points.
3. Stockton Thunder - 86 points.
4. Las Vegas Wranglers - 81 points.
5. Idaho Steelheads - 77 points.
6. Utah Grizzlies - 73 points.
7. Victoria Salmon Kings - 68 points.

== Playoff bracket ==
Conference quarterfinals	Conference semifinals
1	Greenville	3
8	Elmira	1
1	Greenville	3
4	Wheeling	4
4	Wheeling	3
5	South Carolina	1
Eastern Conference
2	Reading	3
7	Cincinnati	1
2	Reading	0
3	Kalamazoo	4
3	Kalamazoo	3
6	Florida	1
1	Alaska	–
8	BYE	–
1	Alaska	4
5	Idaho	0
4	Las Vegas	2
5	Idaho	3
Western Conference
2	Bakersfield	1
7	Victoria	3
7	Victoria	4
6	Utah	0
3	Stockton	1
6	Utah	3

Conference finals
4	Wheeling	2
3	Kalamazoo	4
1	Alaska	4
7	Victoria	0

Kelly Cup finals
W1	Alaska	4
E3	Kalamazoo	1

== Conference Quarterfinals ==
Note: Home team is listed first.

=== Eastern Conference ===
==== (1) Greenville Road Warriors vs. (8) Elmira Jackals ====
April 5	Elmira Jackals	2–5	Greenville Road Warriors	First Arena
No scoring		First period	6:58 – pp – Jimmy Kilpatrick (1); 14:04 – pp – Brandon Wong (1)
Justin Donati (1) - 2:53		Second period	9:27 – Brendan Connolly (1); 19:04 – pp – Mark Voakes (1)
Josh Brittain (1) – 5:40		Third period	19:44 – en – Marc-Olivier Vallerand (1)
Marco Cousineau 23 saves / 27 shots		Goalie stats	Nicola Riopel 30 saves / 32 shots

April 6	Elmira Jackals	6–3	Greenville Road Warriors	First Arena
Eric Lampe (1) – 5:08		First period	12:05 – pp – Brendan Connolly (2); 13:41 – Sam Klassen (1)
Justin Donati (2) – 18:41		Second period	No scoring
A.J. Perry (1) – 11:02; Yannick Tifu (1) – pp – 13:21; Eric Lampe (2) – en – 18:43; Dale Mahovsky (1) – en – 19:44		Third period	18:25 – Mark Voakes (2)
Jared DeMichiel 9 saves / 11 shots Marco Cousineau 23 saves / 24 shots		Goalie stats	Nicola Riopel 25 saves / 29 shots

April 8	Greenville Road Warriors	2–0	Elmira Jackals	BI-LO Center
Chris McKelvie (1) – 10:28		First period	No scoring
No scoring		Second period	No scoring
Sam Klassen (2) – en – 19:34		Third period	No scoring
Chris Beckford-Tseu 18 saves / 18 shots		Goalie stats	Marco Cousineau 28 saves / 29 shots

April 9	Greenville Road Warriors	2–1	2OT	Elmira Jackals	BI-LO Center
No scoring		First period		9:29 – Yannick Tifu (2)
Andrew Rowe (1) - 0:58		Second period		No scoring
No scoring		Third period		No scoring
Sean Berkstresser (1) – 6:22		Second overtime period		No scoring
Chris Beckford-Tseu 26 saves / 27 shots		Goalie stats		Marco Cousineau 47 saves / 49 shots

Greenville wins series 3–1

==== (2) Reading Royals vs. (7) Cincinnati Cyclones ====
April 5	Reading Royals	2–5	Cincinnati Cyclones	Sovereign Center

April 6	Reading Royals	5–4	OT2	Cincinnati Cyclones	Sovereign Center

April 8	Cincinnati Cyclones	0–3	Reading Royals	U.S. Bank Arena

April 9	Cincinnati Cyclones	1–2	OT2	Reading Royals	U.S. Bank Arena

Reading wins series 3–1

==== (3) Kalamazoo Wings vs. (6) Florida Everblades ====
April 5	Florida Everblades	2–1	Kalamazoo Wings	Germain Arena
No scoring		First period	No scoring
Ross Carlson (1) – 8:48; Matt Beca (1) – pp – 15:30		Second period	No scoring
No scoring		Third period	6:12 – pp – Trent Daavettila (1)
Bobby Goepfert 31 saves / 32 shots		Goalie stats	Ryan Nie 20 saves / 22 shots

April 6	Florida Everblades	1–4	Kalamazoo Wings	Germain Arena

April 8	Kalamazoo Wings	4–3	Florida Everblades	Wings Stadium

April 9	Kalamazoo Wings	5–3	Florida Everblades	Wings Stadium

Kalamazoo wins series 3–1

==== (4) Wheeling Nailers vs. (5) South Carolina Stingrays ====
April 5	South Carolina Stingrays	3–4	OT	Wheeling Nailers	North Charleston Coliseum

April 6	South Carolina Stingrays	1–2	OT	Wheeling Nailers	North Charleston Coliseum

April 8	Wheeling Nailers	2–4	South Carolina Stingrays	WesBanco Arena

April 9	Wheeling Nailers	3–2	South Carolina Stingrays	WesBanco Arena

Wheeling wins series 3–1

=== Western Conference ===
==== (2) Bakersfield Condors vs. (7) Victoria Salmon Kings ====
April 4	Victoria Salmon Kings	3–1	Bakersfield Condors	Save-On-Foods Memorial Centre

April 5	Victoria Salmon Kings	3–6	Bakersfield Condors	Save-On-Foods Memorial Centre

April 8	Bakersfield Condors	0–2	Victoria Salmon Kings	Rabobank Arena

April 9	Bakersfield Condors	2–3	OT	Victoria Salmon Kings	Rabobank Arena

Victoria wins series 3–1

==== (3) Stockton Thunder vs. (6) Utah Grizzlies ====
April 5	Utah Grizzlies	5–2	Stockton Thunder	Maverik Center

April 6	Utah Grizzlies	2–3	OT	Stockton Thunder	Maverik Center

April 9	Stockton Thunder	2–4	Utah Grizzlies	Stockton Arena

April 10	Stockton Thunder	0–5	Utah Grizzlies	Stockton Arena

Utah wins series 3–1

==== (4) Las Vegas Wranglers vs. (5) Idaho Steelheads ====
April 5	Las Vegas Wranglers	1–0	2OT	Idaho Steelheads	Orleans Arena
No scoring		First period		No scoring
No scoring		Second period		No scoring
No scoring		Third period		No scoring
17:44 – Ryan Huddy (1)		Second overtime period		No scoring
Michael Ouzas 29 saves / 29 shots		Goalie stats		Jerry Kuhn 48 saves / 49 shots

April 6	Las Vegas Wranglers	2–3	3OT	Idaho Steelheads	Orleans Arena

April 8	Idaho Steelheads	3–1	Las Vegas Wranglers	Qwest Arena

April 9	Idaho Steelheads	1–5	Las Vegas Wranglers	Qwest Arena

April 12	Idaho Steelheads	3–1	Las Vegas Wranglers	Qwest Arena

Idaho wins series 3–2

== Conference Semifinals ==
Note: Home team is listed first.

=== Eastern Conference ===
==== (1) Greenville Road Warriors vs. (4) Wheeling Nailers ====
April 14	Greenville Road Warriors	3–4	Wheeling Nailers	BI-LO Center

April 15	Greenville Road Warriors	2–1	OT	Wheeling Nailers	BI-LO Center

April 20	Wheeling Nailers	3–2	Greenville Road Warriors	WesBanco Arena

April 22	Wheeling Nailers	2–1	Greenville Road Warriors	WesBanco Arena

April 23	Wheeling Nailers	1–5	Greenville Road Warriors	WesBanco Arena

April 26	Greenville Road Warriors	6–3	Wheeling Nailers	BI-LO Center

April 27	Greenville Road Warriors	3–4	OT	Wheeling Nailers	BI-LO Center

Wheeling wins series 4–3

==== (2) Reading Royals vs. (3) Kalamazoo Wings ====
April 15	Reading Royals	3–8	Kalamazoo Wings	Sovereign Center

April 16	Reading Royals	4–5	Kalamazoo Wings	Sovereign Center

April 20	Kalamazoo Wings	5–4	Reading Royals	Wings Stadium

April 22	Kalamazoo Wings	5–4	Reading Royals	Wings Stadium

Kalamazoo wins series 4–0

=== Western Conference ===
==== (1) Alaska Aces vs. (5) Idaho Steelheads ====
April 15	Alaska Aces	2–1	Idaho Steelheads	Sullivan Arena

April 16	Alaska Aces	2–0	Idaho Steelheads	Sullivan Arena

April 20	Idaho Steelheads	1–3	Alaska Aces	Qwest Arena

April 22	Idaho Steelheads	0–4	Alaska Aces	Qwest Arena

Alaska wins series 4–0

==== (6) Utah Grizzlies vs. (7) Victoria Salmon Kings ====
April 15	Utah Grizzlies	2–4	Victoria Salmon Kings	Maverik Center

April 16	Utah Grizzlies	2–4	Victoria Salmon Kings	Maverik Center

April 20	Victoria Salmon Kings	3–2	OT	Utah Grizzlies	Save-On-Foods Memorial Centre

April 22	Victoria Salmon Kings	2–1	OT2	Utah Grizzlies	Save-On-Foods Memorial Centre

Victoria wins series 4–0

== Conference Finals ==
=== Eastern Conference ===
==== (3) Kalamazoo Wings vs. (4) Wheeling Nailers ====
April 29	Kalamazoo Wings	2–3	OT	Wheeling Nailers	Wings Stadium

April 30	Kalamazoo Wings	4–1	Wheeling Nailers	Wings Stadium

May 5	Wheeling Nailers	5–3	Kalamazoo Wings	WesBanco Arena

May 7	Wheeling Nailers	2–3	Kalamazoo Wings	WesBanco Arena

May 8	Wheeling Nailers	0–4	Kalamazoo Wings	WesBanco Arena

May 10	Kalamazoo Wings	6–1	Wheeling Nailers	Wings Stadium

Kalamazoo wins series 4–2

=== Western Conference ===
==== (1) Alaska Aces vs. (7) Victoria Salmon Kings ====
April 27	Alaska Aces	2–1	Victoria Salmon Kings	Sullivan Arena

April 28	Alaska Aces	4–3	OT	Victoria Salmon Kings	Sullivan Arena

April 30	Victoria Salmon Kings	2–6	Alaska Aces	Save-On-Foods Memorial Centre

May 2	Victoria Salmon Kings	2–3	Alaska Aces	Save-On-Foods Memorial Centre

Alaska wins series 4–0

== Kelly Cup Finals ==
=== (1) Alaska Aces vs. (3) Kalamazoo Wings ===
May 14	Alaska Aces	5–0	Kalamazoo Wings	Sullivan Arena

May 15	Alaska Aces	3–2	Kalamazoo Wings	Sullivan Arena

May 18	Kalamazoo Wings	4–1	Alaska Aces	Wings Stadium

May 20	Kalamazoo Wings	5–7	Alaska Aces	Wings Stadium

May 21	Kalamazoo Wings	3–5	Alaska Aces	Wings Stadium

Alaska wins Kelly Cup 4-1

== Statistical leaders ==
=== Skaters ===
These are the top ten skaters based on points.

Player	Team	GP	G	A	Pts	+/–	PIM
Trent Daavettila	Kalamazoo Wings	18	6	22	28	7	8
Sam Ftorek	Kalamazoo Wings	19	7	14	21	0	10
Andrew Fournier	Kalamazoo Wings	19	6	14	20	6	8
Scott Howes	Alaska Aces	12	7	12	19	11	6
Aaron Clarke	Kalamazoo Wings	19	6	10	16	-1	10
Kory Karlander	Kalamazoo Wings	19	7	8	15	3	16
Paul Crowder	Wheeling Nailers	17	4	11	15	0	16
Justin Taylor	Kalamazoo Wings	19	9	5	14	-1	18
Dean Strong	Kalamazoo Wings	15	7	7	14	-2	8
Joey Haddad	Wheeling Nailers	17	7	7	14	-5	38

GP = Games played; G = Goals; A = Assists; Pts = Points; +/– = Plus/minus; PIM = Penalty minutes; Yellow shade = team still in playoffs

All statistics as of: 18:47, 23 May 2011 (UTC)

=== Goaltending ===
These are the top five goaltenders based on both goals against average and save percentage with at least one game played (Note: list is sorted by goals against average).

Player	Team	GP	W	L	SA	GA	GAA	SV%	SO	TOI
Michael Ouzas	Las Vegas Wranglers	5	2	3	153	8	1.25	.948	1	384
Chris Beckford-Tseu	Greenville Road Warriors	4	2	2	87	7	1.59	.920	1	264
Gerald Coleman	Alaska Aces	12	11	1	338	21	1.73	.938	3	729
Jerry Kuhn	Idaho Steelheads	9	3	6	300	19	1.83	.937	0	624
Marco Cousineau	Elmira Jackals	4	1	3	129	8	1.91	.938	0	251

GP = Games played; W = Wins; L = Losses; SA = Shots against; GA = Goals against; GAA = Goals against average; SV% = Save percentage; SO = Shutouts; TOI = Time on ice (in minutes); Yellow shade = team still in playoffs

All statistics as of: 18:47, 23 May 2011 (UTC)

== See also ==
- 2010–11 ECHL season
- List of ECHL seasons

Preceded by 2010 Kelly Cup playoffs	Kelly Cup Playoffs; 2011	Succeeded by 2012 Kelly Cup playoffs
