= Michael McLean =

Michael McLean or Mike McLean may refer to:

- Michael McLean (composer) (born 1952), American composer
- Michael McLean (violinist) (born 1966), American violinist and composer
- Michael McLean (footballer) (born 1965), former Australian Football League player
- Michael McLean (golfer) (born 1963), English professional golfer
- Michael McLean (rugby league), Australian former rugby league footballer
- Michael Dalton McLean (1880–1958), Conservative member of the Canadian House of Commons
- Michael S. McLean (born 1942), American director, editor and producer on films and TV shows
- Mike McLean (sprinter) (born 1970), Canadian track and field athlete
- Mike McLean (ice hockey) (born 1986), Canadian professional ice hockey player
- Mike McLean (rugby league) (born 1963), Australian rugby league player

== See also ==
- Mike McClean, British broadcaster
