= 2010 Kelly Cup playoffs =

Tournament details
- Dates: April 5–May 21, 2010
- Teams: 15

Final positions
- Champions: Cincinnati Cyclones
- Runners-up: Idaho Steelheads

Tournament statistics
- Scoring leader(s): Milan Gajic (Florida ) & Ryan Cruthers (Reading) (16 points)

The 2010 Kelly Cup Playoffs of the ECHL began April 5, 2010. 15 teams qualified, eight from the American Conference and seven from the National Conference. In the American conference, the winners of each of the three divisions plus the five teams with the highest point totals from the teams remaining qualified. Due to the National Conference's membership being limited to only eight teams, the two division winners and the five teams with the highest point totals from the teams remaining qualified, with the division winner with the highest point total receiving a bye to the conference semifinals.

The conference quarterfinals will be a 2-3 format with the higher seed choosing if it wishes to host Games 1-2 or Games 3-5. Teams that are less than 350 miles apart may choose to play a 2-2-1 format.

The remaining rounds will be best-of-seven game series.

Due to a scheduling conflict with their home arena, the Alaska Aces were forced to play their home games in the National Conference quarterfinals against the Stockton Thunder at the Curtis D. Menard Memorial Sports Center in nearby Wasilla.

== Playoff seeds ==
After the regular season, 15 teams qualified for the playoffs. The Idaho Steelheads were the National Conference regular season champions and the Brabham Cup winners with the best record at 103 points. The Charlotte Checkers earned the top seed in the American Conference after winning a tiebreaker with the Kalamazoo Wings and South Carolina Stingrays after each of the three teams finished the season with 94 points each.

=== American Conference ===
1. Charlotte Checkers – South Division and American Conference regular season champions, 94 points (43 wins - South Division)
2. Kalamazoo Wings – North Division champions, 94 points (42 wins)
3. Elmira Jackals – East Division champions, 83 points
4. South Carolina Stingrays – 94 points (41 wins - South Division)
5. Cincinnati Cyclones – 91 points
6. Florida Everblades – 85 points
7. Reading Royals – 80 points
8. Toledo Walleye – 77 points
- NOTE: Tie-Breakers:
  - South Division - Charlotte defeats South Carolina on wins (43 wins to 41 wins)
  - Conference Seeding - Charlotte defeats Kalamazoo on wins (43 wins to 42 wins)

=== National Conference ===
1. Idaho Steelheads – West Division and National Conference regular season champions; Brabham Cup winners, 103 points
2. Bakersfield Condors – Pacific Division champions, 81 points
3. Alaska Aces – 80 points
4. Utah Grizzlies – 77 points
5. Las Vegas Wranglers – 76 points (34 wins)
6. Stockton Thunder – 76 points (33 wins)
7. Victoria Salmon Kings – 74 points

== Playoff bracket ==
Conference Quarterfinals	Conference Semifinals
1	Idaho	4
4	Utah	0
4	Utah	3
5	Las Vegas	2
National Conference
2	Bakersfield	3
7	Victoria	2
2	Bakersfield	1
6	Stockton	4
3	Alaska	1
6	Stockton	3
1	Charlotte	3
8	Toledo	1
1	Charlotte	3
5	Cincinnati	4
4	South Carolina	2
5	Cincinnati	3
American Conference
2	Kalamazoo	2
7	Reading	3
7	Reading	4
6	Florida	0
3	Elmira	2
6	Florida	3

Conference Finals
1	Idaho	4
6	Stockton	2
5	Cincinnati	4
7	Reading	3

Kelly Cup Finals
1	Idaho	1
5	Cincinnati	4

== Conference Quarterfinals ==
Note: Home team is listed first.

=== American Conference ===
==== (1) Charlotte Checkers vs. (8) Toledo Walleye ====
April 6	Toledo Walleye	7–2	Charlotte Checkers	Lucas County Arena

April 7	Toledo Walleye	1–6	Charlotte Checkers	Lucas County Arena

April 9	Charlotte Checkers	3–1	Toledo Walleye	Time Warner Cable Arena

April 11	Charlotte Checkers	5–4	OT	Toledo Walleye	Time Warner Cable Arena

Charlotte wins series 3–1

==== (2) Kalamazoo Wings vs. (7) Reading Royals ====
April 6	Kalamazoo Wings	6–5	OT	Reading Royals	Wings Stadium

April 7	Kalamazoo Wings	1–4	Reading Royals	Wings Stadium

April 9	Reading Royals	5–2	Kalamazoo Wings	Sovereign Center

April 11	Reading Royals	3–4	OT	Kalamazoo Wings	Sovereign Center

April 12	Reading Royals	3–2	OT	Kalamazoo Wings	Sovereign Center

Reading wins series 3–2

==== (3) Elmira Jackals vs. (6) Florida Everblades ====
April 6	Florida Everblades	4–3	Elmira Jackals	Germain Arena

April 7	Florida Everblades	2–5	Elmira Jackals	Germain Arena

April 9	Elmira Jackals	2–6	Florida Everblades	First Arena

April 10	Elmira Jackals	6–3	Florida Everblades	First Arena

April 11	Elmira Jackals	3–4	Florida Everblades	First Arena

Florida wins series 3–2

==== (4) South Carolina Stingrays vs. (5) Cincinnati Cyclones ====
April 6	Cincinnati Cyclones	6–1	South Carolina Stingrays	US Bank Arena

April 7	Cincinnati Cyclones	1–3	South Carolina Stingrays	US Bank Arena

April 9	South Carolina Stingrays	0–1	OT	Cincinnati Cyclones	North Charleston Coliseum

April 10	South Carolina Stingrays	3–2	OT	Cincinnati Cyclones	North Charleston Coliseum

April 11	South Carolina Stingrays	2–3	OT	Cincinnati Cyclones	North Charleston Coliseum

Cincinnati wins series 3–2

=== National Conference ===
==== (2) Bakersfield Condors vs. (7) Victoria Salmon Kings ====
April 7	Victoria Salmon Kings	6–3	Bakersfield Condors	Save-On-Foods Memorial Centre

April 8	Victoria Salmon Kings	2–4	Bakersfield Condors	Save-On-Foods Memorial Centre

April 10	Bakersfield Condors	1–3	Victoria Salmon Kings	Rabobank Arena

April 11	Bakersfield Condors	5–2	Victoria Salmon Kings	Rabobank Arena

April 12	Bakersfield Condors	2–1	Victoria Salmon Kings	Rabobank Arena

Bakersfield wins series 3–2

==== (3) Alaska Aces vs. (6) Stockton Thunder ====
April 5	Alaska Aces	4–3	Stockton Thunder	Menard Memorial Sports Center

April 6	Alaska Aces	2–5	Stockton Thunder	Menard Memorial Sports Center

April 9	Stockton Thunder	7–4	Alaska Aces	Stockton Arena

April 10	Stockton Thunder	8–5	Alaska Aces	Stockton Arena

Stockton wins series 3–1

==== (4) Utah Grizzlies vs. (5) Las Vegas Wranglers ====
April 6	Las Vegas Wranglers	6–4	Utah Grizzlies	Orleans Arena

April 7	Las Vegas Wranglers	1–4	Utah Grizzlies	Orleans Arena

April 10	Utah Grizzlies	3–6	Las Vegas Wranglers	E Center

April 11	Utah Grizzlies	4–2	Las Vegas Wranglers	E Center

April 13	Utah Grizzlies	5–1	Las Vegas Wranglers	E Center

Utah wins series 3–2

== Conference semifinals ==
Note: Home team is listed first.

=== American Conference ===
==== (1) Charlotte Checkers vs. (5) Cincinnati Cyclones ====
April 16	Charlotte Checkers	3–4	Cincinnati Cyclones	Time Warner Cable Arena

April 17	Charlotte Checkers	5–0	Cincinnati Cyclones	Time Warner Cable Arena

April 21	Cincinnati Cyclones	9–5	Charlotte Checkers	US Bank Arena

April 23	Cincinnati Cyclones	1–4	Charlotte Checkers	US Bank Arena

April 24	Cincinnati Cyclones	2–1	Charlotte Checkers	US Bank Arena

April 27	Charlotte Checkers	3–0	Cincinnati Cyclones	Time Warner Cable Arena

April 28	Charlotte Checkers	1–2	Cincinnati Cyclones	Time Warner Cable Arena

Cincinnati wins series 4–3

==== (6) Florida Everblades vs. (7) Reading Royals ====
April 14	Reading Royals	7–6	Florida Everblades	Sovereign Center

April 15	Reading Royals	5–4	Florida Everblades	Sovereign Center

April 17	Florida Everblades	1–2	Reading Royals	Germain Arena

April 20	Florida Everblades	1–2	Reading Royals	Germain Arena

Reading wins series 4–0

=== National Conference ===
==== (1) Idaho Steelheads vs. (4) Utah Grizzlies ====
April 16	Idaho Steelheads	7–2	Utah Grizzlies	Qwest Arena

April 17	Idaho Steelheads	4–3	Utah Grizzlies	Qwest Arena

April 20	Utah Grizzlies	1–6	Idaho Steelheads	E Center

April 23	Utah Grizzlies	1–4	Idaho Steelheads	E Center

Idaho wins series 4–0

==== (2) Bakersfield Condors vs. (6) Stockton Thunder ====
April 16	Bakersfield Condors	2–3	OT	Stockton Thunder	Rabobank Arena

April 17	Bakersfield Condors	3–4	OT	Stockton Thunder	Rabobank Arena

April 21	Stockton Thunder	0–3	Bakersfield Condors	Stockton Arena

April 23	Stockton Thunder	6–2	Bakersfield Condors	Stockton Arena

April 24	Stockton Thunder	7–4	Bakersfield Condors	Stockton Arena

Stockton wins series 4–1

== Conference Finals ==
=== American Conference finals: (5) Cincinnati Cyclones vs. (7) Reading Royals ===
April 30	Cincinnati Cyclones	2–5	Reading Royals	US Bank Arena

May 1	Cincinnati Cyclones	1–3	Reading Royals	US Bank Arena

May 4	Reading Royals	4–2	Cincinnati Cyclones	Sovereign Center

May 8	Reading Royals	4–6	Cincinnati Cyclones	Sovereign Center

May 9	Reading Royals	0–5	Cincinnati Cyclones	Sovereign Center

May 11	Cincinnati Cyclones	6–3	Reading Royals	US Bank Arena

May 12	Cincinnati Cyclones	1–0	Reading Royals	US Bank Arena

Cincinnati wins series 4-3

=== National Conference finals: (1) Idaho Steelheads vs. (6) Stockton Thunder ===
April 30	Idaho Steelheads	4–2	Stockton Thunder	Qwest Arena

May 1	Idaho Steelheads	4–0	Stockton Thunder	Qwest Arena

May 5	Stockton Thunder	1–0	3OT	Idaho Steelheads	Stockton Arena

May 7	Stockton Thunder	7–2	Idaho Steelheads	Stockton Arena

May 8	Stockton Thunder	3–6	Idaho Steelheads	Stockton Arena

May 11	Idaho Steelheads	7–5	Stockton Thunder	Qwest Arena

Idaho wins series 4–2

== Kelly Cup Finals ==
=== (1) Idaho Steelheads vs (5) Cincinnati Cyclones ===
May 14	Idaho Steelheads	2–3	Cincinnati Cyclones	Qwest Arena

May 15	Idaho Steelheads	0–1	Cincinnati Cyclones	Qwest Arena

May 18	Cincinnati Cyclones	3–4	2OT	Idaho Steelheads	US Bank Arena

May 20	Cincinnati Cyclones	3–2	Idaho Steelheads	US Bank Arena

May 21	Cincinnati Cyclones	2–1	Idaho Steelheads	US Bank Arena

Cincinnati wins Kelly Cup 4–1

== Statistical leaders ==
=== Skaters ===
These are the top ten skaters based on points.

Player	Team	GP	G	A	Pts	+/–	PIM
Milan Gajic	Florida Everblades	9	7	9	16	6	0
Ryan Cruthers	Reading Royals	9	6	10	16	9	4
James Sixsmith	Utah Grizzlies	8	2	10	12	6	8
Olivier Labelle	Reading Royals	9	7	4	11	7	14
Oren Eizenman	Stockton Thunder	6	2	9	11	5	0
Ben Gordon	Reading Royals	9	2	8	10	6	4
Ryan Kinasewich	Utah Grizzlies	8	6	3	9	0	8
Marc Cavosie	Reading Royals	9	5	4	9	1	4
Bryan Miller	Alaska Aces	4	3	6	9	-2	0
Matthew Pistilli	Florida Everblades	8	3	6	9	1	2

GP = Games played; G = Goals; A = Assists; Pts = Points; +/– = Plus/minus; PIM = Penalty minutes; Yellow shade = team still in playoffs

All statistics as of: 04:04, 21 April 2010 (UTC)

=== Goaltending ===
These are the top five goaltenders based on both goals against average and save percentage with at least one game played (Note: list is sorted by goals against average).

Player	Team	GP	W	L	SA	GA	GAA	SV%	SO	TOI
Richard Bachman	Idaho Steelheads	3	3	0	87	6	2.00	.931	0	180
Jeremy Smith	Cincinnati Cyclones	7	4	3	458	17	2.23	.919	1	458
Riley Gill	Kalamazoo Wings	4	1	2	135	8	2.26	.941	0	212
Todd Ford	South Carolina Stingrays	5	2	3	134	13	2.30	.903	0	339
Timo Pielmeier	Bakersfield Condors	3	1	2	97	8	2.55	.918	0	189

GP = Games played; W = Wins; L = Losses; SA = Shots against; GA = Goals against; GAA = Goals against average; SV% = Save percentage; SO = Shutouts; TOI = Time on ice (in minutes); Yellow shade = team still in playoffs

All statistics as of: 04:04, 21 April 2010 (UTC)

== See also ==
- 2009–10 ECHL season
- List of ECHL seasons

Preceded by 2009 Kelly Cup playoffs	Kelly Cup Playoffs; 2010	Succeeded by 2011 Kelly Cup playoffs
