= Larry Courville =

Canadian ice hockey player and coach

- Born: April 2, 1975 (age 51) Timmins, Ontario, Canada
- Height: 6 ft 1 in (185 cm)
- Weight: 180 lb (82 kg; 12 st 12 lb)
- Position: Left wing
- Shot: Left
- Played for: Vancouver Canucks
- NHL draft: 119th overall, 1993; Winnipeg Jets; 61st overall, 1995; Vancouver Canucks
- Playing career: 1995–2001

Larry P. Courville (born April 2, 1975) is a Canadian professional ice hockey coach and former player. Throughout his career, Courville spent parts of three seasons in the National Hockey League (NHL). From 2009 to 2017, he served as head coach of the Reading Royals of the ECHL.

Born in Timmins, Ontario, Courville was originally drafted by the Winnipeg Jets in the fifth round (119th overall) of the 1993 NHL entry draft. He had an excellent final OHL season in 1994–95 in which he scored 73 points and was a key component of Canada's gold medal-winning team at the 1995 World Junior Championships, but was unable to come to contract terms with Winnipeg. As a result, he re-entered the draft and was selected 61st overall by the Vancouver Canucks in the 1995 NHL draft.

Courville had a fine first professional season the following year with Vancouver AHL affiliate in Syracuse, scoring 49 points and earning a 3-game call-up to the Canucks, where he scored his first NHL goal. Over the next two seasons, he would continue to be a frequent call-up, seeing 30 more games in the NHL with Vancouver. However, he struggled to produce recording just 2 assists.

After spending four seasons in the Canuck organization, Courville was released in 1999 and signed with the San Jose Sharks. Courville's grit and leadership proved a valuable asset to the Sharks' farm team in Kentucky, but he failed to see any action with the Sharks in two seasons with the organization.

Since leaving the San Jose organization, Courville has played in the minor leagues. He was possibly the biggest name player in the short-lived North Eastern Hockey League, playing for the York IceCats in the 2003–04 season. After spending three seasons with the Reading Royals, Courville retired.

He was named interim head coach for the Royals on January 6, 2009, replacing Jason Nobili, and returned as head coach for the 2009–10 season. During the 2016–17 season, he announced he would be stepping down from his position with the Royals. However, after qualifying for the playoffs, the Royals fired Courville on April 3, 2017. He is now the hockey director of the Lancaster Firebirds youth hockey.

== Career statistics ==
			Regular season					Playoffs
Season	Team	League	GP	G	A	Pts	PIM	GP	G	A	Pts	PIM
1990–91	Waterloo Siskins	OHA-B	47	20	18	38	144	—	—	—	—	—
1991–92	Cornwall Royals	OHL	60	8	12	20	80	6	0	0	0	8
1992–93	Newmarket Royals	OHL	64	21	18	39	181	7	0	6	6	14
1993–94	Newmarket Royals	OHL	39	20	19	39	134	—	—	—	—	—
1993–94	Moncton Hawks	AHL	8	2	0	2	37	10	2	2	4	27
1994–95	Sarnia Sting	OHL	16	9	9	18	58	—	—	—	—	—
1994–95	Oshawa Generals	OHL	28	25	30	55	72	7	4	10	14	10
1995–96	Vancouver Canucks	NHL	3	1	0	1	0	—	—	—	—	—
1995–96	Syracuse Crunch	AHL	71	17	32	49	127	14	5	3	8	10
1996–97	Vancouver Canucks	NHL	19	0	2	2	11	—	—	—	—	—
1996–97	Syracuse Crunch	AHL	54	20	24	44	103	3	0	1	1	20
1997–98	Vancouver Canucks	NHL	11	0	0	0	5	—	—	—	—	—
1997–98	Syracuse Crunch	AHL	29	6	12	18	84	—	—	—	—	—
1998–99	Syracuse Crunch	AHL	71	13	28	41	155	—	—	—	—	—
1999–00	Kentucky Thoroughblades	AHL	61	11	12	23	107	9	1	5	6	16
2000–01	Kentucky Thoroughblades	AHL	71	20	16	36	112	3	0	0	0	6
2001–02	Hershey Bears	AHL	49	3	6	9	61	—	—	—	—	—
2001–02	Reading Royals	ECHL	8	1	2	3	10	—	—	—	—	—
2001–02	Cincinnati Mighty Ducks	AHL	1	0	0	0	2	—	—	—	—	—
2003–04	Johnstown Chiefs	ECHL	38	13	22	35	67	1	0	0	0	4
2004–05	Reading Royals	ECHL	64	9	15	24	78	4	0	0	0	6
2005–06	Reading Royals	ECHL	57	12	16	28	81	4	2	5	7	10
2006–07	Reading Royals	ECHL	13	2	2	4	14	—	—	—	—	—
2007–08	Reading Royals	ECHL	10	0	5	5	14	—	—	—	—	—
NHL totals			33	1	2	3	16	—	—	—	—	—
AHL totals			415	92	130	222	788	39	8	11	19	79
