= Yannick Tifu =

Canadian ice hockey player (born 1984)

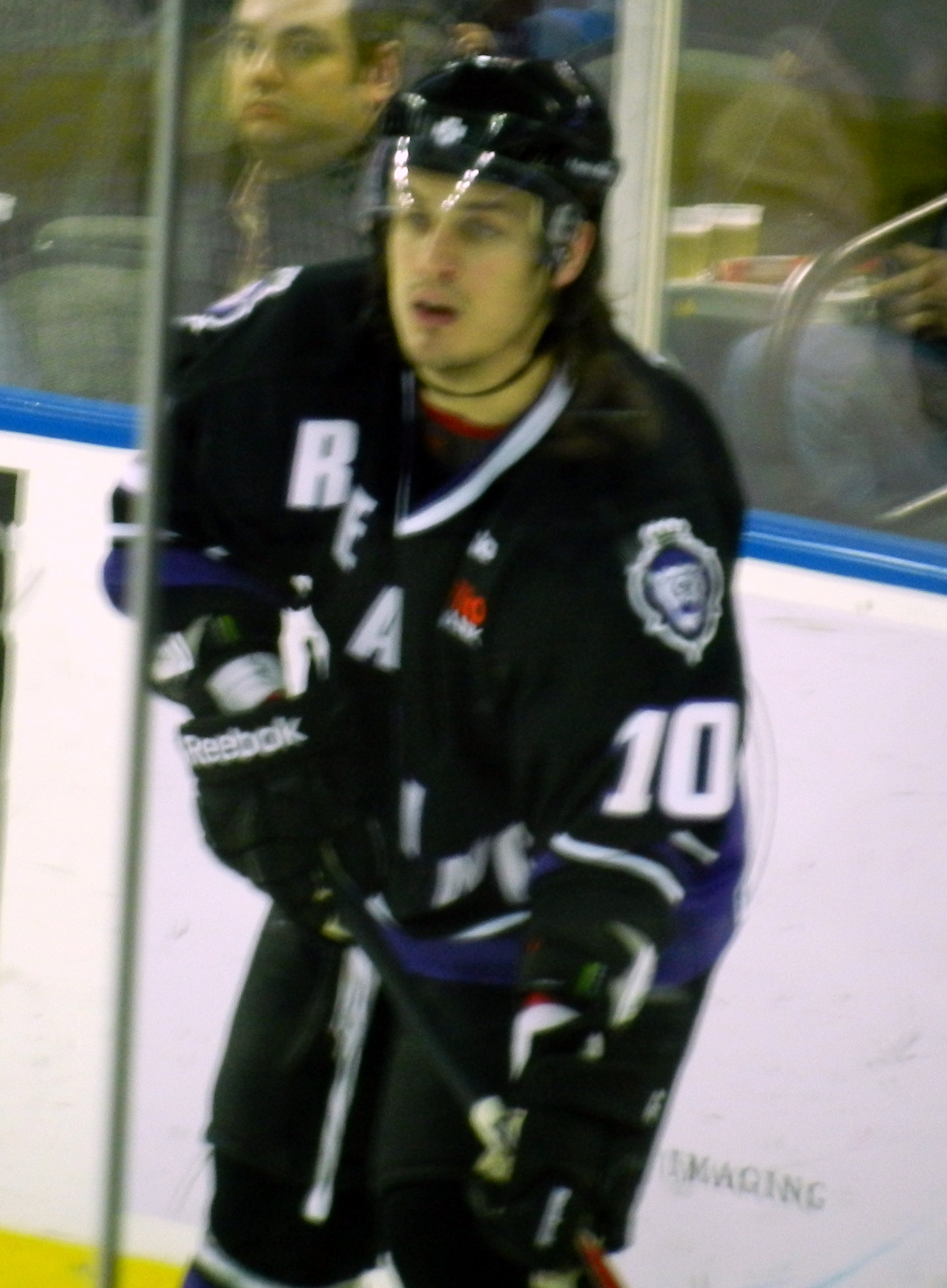
- Tifu with the Reading Royals in 2012
- Born: October 12, 1984 (age 41) Brossard, Quebec, Canada
- Height: 5 ft 11 in (180 cm)
- Weight: 185 lb (84 kg; 13 st 3 lb)
- Position: Centre
- Shoots: Left
- LNAH team Former teams: Saint-Georges Cool FM 103.5; AHL; Albany River Rats; Binghamton Senators; Rochester Americans; ECHL; Phoenix RoadRunners; Dayton Bombers; Florida Everblades; Victoria Salmon Kings; Elmira Jackals; Chicago Express; Reading Royals; Brampton Beast; Ligue Magnus; Ducs d'Angers
- NHL draft: Undrafted
- Playing career: 2005–present

Yannick Tifu (born October 12, 1984) is a Canadian professional ice hockey Centre who currently plays for the Saint-Georges Cool FM 103.5 of the Ligue Nord-Américaine de Hockey. Tifu is described as an agitator with scoring prowess.

== Playing career ==
Prior to turning professional, Tifu played major junior hockey in the QMJHL with the Rouyn-Noranda Huskies.

Undrafted on August 14, 2008, the Dayton Bombers traded Tifu to the Florida Everblades for Jarret Lukin, Steve Czech, Mike McLean, and future considerations. After completion of his second season with the Elmira Jackals which included loan stints in the American Hockey League with the Binghamton Senators, Tifu signed as a free agent with the inaugural Chicago Express of the ECHL on October 7, 2011, despite considerable interest from Jackals rivals, the Reading Royals.

In the 2011–12 season, on November 28, 2011, and after only 17 games with the Express, Tifu was traded to the Reading Royals in exchange for Chad Painchaud. Tifu immediately established himself within the Royals and by March 2012, was selected as team Captain. He finished the season leading the team with 59 points in just 52 games before suffering a first round defeat.

Tifu was extended by the Royals to continue as captain in the 2012–13 season. He appeared as the only player to partake in every game for the Royals throughout the season, used as the team's primary offensive center. In leading the team in each offensive category with 27 goals, 45 assists and 72 points he became the third player in Royals history to reach the feat and the second to lead the Royals in consecutive seasons. In the post-season, Tifu completed what is considered as the best individual season by any Royals player, by leading the league with 12 goals and 25 points to help capture the Royals first Kelly Cup. Selected as both the Team and Fans MVP, Tifu was the first player re-signed to a contract for the following season on July 4, 2013.

After three seasons with the Royals, Tifu signed abroad in agreeing to a one-year contract with French club, Ducs d'Angers of the Ligue Magnus on June 10, 2014. In his only season with the club, Tifu adapted quickly to an elite status in France contributing with 35 points in just 26 games.

In the off-season returned to the ECHL in signing a contract with the Brampton Beast on July 29, 2015. In the 2015–16 season, Tifu appeared in 5 games with the Beast, and recorded his 500th ECHL point before he was traded in a return to the Reading Royals on October 28, 2015.

From 2016 to 2021, Tifu played for Saint-Georges Cool FM 103.5 and of the Ligue Nord-Américaine de Hockey. However, due to the restrictions of attendance and the league stopping in December 2021 because of COVID-19, Tifu joined the Watertown Wolves of the Federal Prospects Hockey League at the beginning of 2022.

== Personal life ==
While still playing in Saint-Georges, Yannick Tifu is now the store director of Canada's largest hockey store HockeySupremacy.com

== Career statistics ==
			Regular season					Playoffs
Season	Team	League	GP	G	A	Pts	PIM	GP	G	A	Pts	PIM
2001–02	Rouyn-Noranda Huskies	QMJHL	69	8	17	25	48	4	1	0	1	4
2002–03	Rouyn-Noranda Huskies	QMJHL	70	21	30	51	74	4	0	1	1	0
2003–04	Rouyn-Noranda Huskies	QMJHL	70	42	48	90	39	11	4	6	10	8
2004–05	Rouyn-Noranda Huskies	QMJHL	70	28	54	82	55	10	5	1	6	11
2005–06	Rockford IceHogs	UHL	76	23	49	72	102	9	1	7	8	12
2006–07	Phoenix RoadRunners	ECHL	13	2	10	12	20	—	—	—	—	—
2006–07	Dayton Bombers	ECHL	65	26	51	77	84	22	7	10	17	20
2007–08	Dayton Bombers	ECHL	39	15	42	57	39	—	—	—	—	—
2007–08	Albany River Rats	AHL	9	2	3	5	0	—	—	—	—	—
2007–08	Rochester Americans	AHL	15	1	2	3	15	—	—	—	—	—
2008–09	Albany River Rats	AHL	37	3	15	18	33	—	—	—	—	—
2008–09	Florida Everblades	ECHL	24	6	27	33	49	9	1	4	5	4
2009–10	Victoria Salmon Kings	ECHL	6	0	0	0	6	—	—	—	—	—
2009–10	Elmira Jackals	ECHL	48	15	41	56	69	5	2	3	5	6
2009–10	Albany River Rats	AHL	3	1	0	1	4	—	—	—	—	—
2009–10	Binghamton Senators	AHL	7	2	1	3	2	—	—	—	—	—
2010–11	Elmira Jackals	ECHL	68	28	45	73	109	4	2	3	5	2
2010–11	Binghamton Senators	AHL	10	0	1	1	2	—	—	—	—	—
2011–12	Chicago Express	ECHL	17	3	8	11	19	—	—	—	—	—
2011–12	Reading Royals	ECHL	52	20	39	59	46	5	2	1	3	2
2012–13	Reading Royals	ECHL	72	27	45	72	84	22	12	13	25	14
2013–14	Reading Royals	ECHL	60	19	29	48	59	5	0	0	0	0
2014–15	Ducs d'Angers	FRA	26	14	21	35	48	10	3	4	7	12
2015–16	Brampton Beast	ECHL	5	1	1	2	2	—	—	—	—	—
2015–16	Reading Royals	ECHL	61	18	25	43	46	14	2	6	8	8
2016–17	St. Georges Cool 103.5 FM	LNAH	40	18	32	50	36	—	—	—	—	—
2017–18	St. Georges Cool 103.5 FM	LNAH	8	0	6	6	2	—	—	—	—	—
2017–18	Trois-Rivières Draveurs	LNAH	30	12	19	31	23	—	—	—	—	—
2018–19	St. Georges Cool 103.5 FM	LNAH	36	13	29	42	26	9	5	5	10	20
2019–20	St. Georges Cool 103.5 FM	LNAH	36	16	32	48	10	—	—	—	—	—
ECHL totals			526	180	363	543	632	86	28	40	68	56
AHL totals			81	9	23	32	56	—	—	—	—	—
