= Reading Royals =

Ice hockey team

- City: Reading, Pennsylvania
- League: ECHL
- Conference: Eastern
- Division: North
- Founded: 1991
- Home arena: Santander Arena
- Colors: Purple, black, orange, silver, white
- Owner: Berks County Convention Center Authority
- General manager: Anthony Peters
- Head coach: Anthony Peters
- Media: Reading Eagle; WFMZ
- Affiliates: Philadelphia Flyers (NHL); Lehigh Valley Phantoms (AHL)

Franchise history
- 1991–1999: Columbus Chill
- 2001–present: Reading Royals

Championships
- Division titles: 5 (2004–05, 2010–11, 2012–13, 2013–14, 2021–22)
- Conference titles: 1 (2012–13)
- Kelly Cups: 1 (2012–13)

The Reading Royals are a professional ice hockey team that currently plays in the ECHL. The team participates in the North Division of the ECHL's Eastern Conference. The Royals play their home games at the Santander Arena located in downtown Reading, Pennsylvania.

Since 2001, the Royals have ranked among ECHL leaders in regular season attendance. On March 25, 2006, against the Trenton Titans, the Royals reached their one millionth fan in attendance. The Royals hosted two ECHL All-Star Games; one in 2005 and one in 2009. The Royals were the 2013 ECHL Kelly Cup champions. They earned the title with a five-game victory over the Stockton Thunder in the 2013 Kelly Cup Finals.

== Franchise history ==
=== Columbus Chill and Kings era ===
The Reading Royals were founded in 1991 as the Columbus Chill. David Paitson was the team's first president and general manager while former NHL player Terry Ruskowski was the head coach, started the team with a goal of introducing new audiences to the sport of ice hockey and building a strong fan base. The two were successful with the help of an extensive marketing plan. The Chill's 83-game sellout streak beginning in early January 1992 still stands as a minor league hockey record today. It would take the team two seasons to reach the playoffs, doing so in 1994 under coach Ruskowski. The Chill would go on to win two conference championships and make the playoffs for five of the eight seasons. The Chill were a key part of the growth of hockey in Columbus, Ohio, and paved the way for the National Hockey League expansion Columbus Blue Jackets in 2000.

The Chill then suspended operations for in 1999 to make room for the Blue Jackets. The Chill franchise relocated during their inactive two year status to their present location in downtown Reading, Pennsylvania, for the 2001–02 season as the Reading Royals. When the franchise returned to active status in the ECHL, they became the affiliate of the NHL's Los Angeles Kings and their American Hockey League affiliate, the Manchester Monarchs. At the time, the Royals were partially owned by the same owners of the Kings and Monarchs, the Anschutz Entertainment Group (AEG). The rest of the ownership was by Santander Arena management, SMG.

The Royals made their first trip to the Kelly Cup playoffs in 2004 in their third season, winning the North Division playoff championship under head coach Derek Clancey. In the next season, they became the North Division regular season champions, only to lose to the eventual Kelly Cup champion Trenton Titans in the North Division Finals.

Under coach Karl Taylor from 2005 to 2008, the Royals had generally mediocre performance in regular season performances. In the 2007–08 season, skaters Dany Roussin and Brock Hooton enjoyed some fame in Reading due to their "goal-a-game" nature for much of the season, while tough-guys Steven Later and Malcolm MacMillan were among league leaders in penalty minutes. After a strong finish to the regular season, Taylor led the team to the North Division Finals where their tour ended in a seven-game battle with the Cincinnati Cyclones. The Cyclones continued on to sweep past other teams to win the Kelly Cup, but the Royals were the only team to take them to seven games in the playoffs.

Some better-known players during this era who played for the Royals include Los Angeles Kings goaltenders Barry Brust, Jonathan Quick, and Yutaka Fukufuji; Phoenix Coyotes winger Ryan Flinn; Toronto Maple Leafs goaltender James Reimer; and Anaheim Ducks winger George Parros, who was the first Royal to appear in the Stanley Cup finals. Veteran Larry Courville and former head coach Derek Clancey have also contributed to the Royals organization.

=== New affiliations and the Courville era ===
The 2007–08 season would be Karl Taylor's last with the Royals organization. In late June 2008, general manager Gordon Kaye announced that Taylor would leave Reading to serve as coach for the AEG's newly acquired ECHL franchise, the Ontario Reign. The new team would also become the primary affiliate for AEG's Kings and Monarchs. On July 9, 2008, the Royals became the affiliate of the Boston Bruins and a secondary affiliate for the Toronto Maple Leafs for the 2008–09 season. The Royals continued to wear their colors of purple, black, and silver. The Santander Arena and the city of Reading, Pennsylvania, were also named the hosts of the 2009 All-Star Game and Skills Challenge. On July 24, 2008, Reading announced that Jason Nobili would be head coach for the 2008–09 season. Unfortunately, Nobili was unable to coax much from the team and was dismissed by Kaye on January 6, 2009, with the team in last place overall in the ECHL. Larry Courville was named as interim coach for the remainder of the season.

On April 4, 2009, general manager Gordon Kaye announced that Courville would return for the 2009–10 season as full-time head coach. On August 4, 2009, The Royals announced it renewed their affiliations with the Bruins and Maple Leafs and the AHL's Toronto Marlies.

In 2011, AEG sold off its shares of the Royals to the Berks County Convention Center Authority (BCCCA).

On July 9, 2012, the Royals became the affiliate of the Washington Capitals. At the end of their first season with the Capitals, the Royals won the 2013 Kelly Cup by defeating the Stockton Thunder in five games. Captain Yannick Tifu played in every regular season and postseason game, scoring a game-winning goal in the final minutes of game four of the Eastern Conference Finals against the Cincinnati Cyclones. Reading won the first three games of the 2013 Kelly Cup Finals against the Stockton Thunder. On May 25, 2013, goaltender Riley Gill had a 29-save shutout and the Royals defeated the Thunder 6–0 to claim the team's first Kelly Cup. Riley Gill was named the MVP for the playoffs with a 13–4–0 record, a 1.91 a goals against average, a .930 save percentage, and four shutouts.

In 2014, Jack Gulati purchased all shares of the ownership of the Royals from SMG and BCCCA. In June 2014, the Philadelphia Flyers announced a two-year affiliation agreement with the Royals, giving the Flyers an entirely Pennsylvania based minor league system for the first time since 1997–98. The Flyers and Royals agreed to a multi-year affiliation extension in 2016.

During his eighth full season as head coach, Courville announced he would be stepping down at the end of the 2016–17 season. However, one day after qualifying for the 2017 playoffs, he was fired by the Royals and replaced by assistant Kirk MacDonald on an interim basis. The interim tag was removed from MacDonald a few weeks after the Royals were eliminated in the first round of the 2017 playoffs.

=== 2017–2022: Kirk MacDonald era ===
The Royals' first season under Kirk MacDonald resulted in a third-place finish in the North Division with a 39–24–9–0 record and 87 points. Reading finished two points behind the Adirondack Thunder for first place. The Manchester Monarchs earned 88 points in the regular season and then swept the Royals in the North Division semifinals. The Monarchs won the first two games of the series in double overtime despite goaltender John Muse making 54 saves in game one and 53 in game two. In game three, Muse registered 52 saves, giving the three-highest postseason save performances from a Reading netminder in a four-day span. Forward Matt Willows lead the team with 32 goals and 74 points before he announced his retirement after the season. Muse split the season between Reading and the Lehigh Valley Phantoms of the AHL and tied for a league-high .931 save percentage. The Royals took 658 penalty minutes, the fewest in ECHL history.

During the 2018–19 season, the Royals' owner Jack Gulati agreed to sell the team back to the Berks County Convention Center Authority (BCCCA), the previous ownership and the owners of Santander Arena, on June 30, 2019. The Royals concluded the 2018–19 season with a six-game win streak and eight-game point streak, finishing with 78 points and a 34–28–4–6 record, but were one point behind the Brampton Beast for the final playoff spot in the North Division. Reading had the most points of any team to miss the 2019 Kelly Cup playoffs. The Royals used eight goaltenders through the season, tied for the most in team history. Jamie Phillips went 8–2–0–1 in his final 12 games of the season after being reassigned to Reading at the trade deadline. Chris McCarthy had a career-best 54 assists and 74 points (third in league). On May 9, 2019, the Royals re-signed head coach Kirk McDonald to a two-year contract extension. The Royals and Flyers also renewed their affiliation though at least the 2019–20 season with a 2020–21 renewal option.

Due to the COVID-19 pandemic, the Royals voluntarily suspended operations for the 2020–21 ECHL season. The team returned for the 2021–22 season with another renewed affiliation with the Flyers.

On June 13, 2022, MacDonald announced he would resign as head coach.

=== 2022–2024: James Henry era ===
On June 17, 2022, the Royals announced that James Henry would take over as head coach. On August 8, 2022, the Royals and Flyers announced that their partnership extended throughout the 2023–24 season with an option to extend the deal further.

James Henry was relieved of Head Coaching duties on Jan 29th, 2024.

=== 2024–2025: Jason Binkley era ===
After serving as the interim Head Coach following the dismissal of Head Coach James Henry, the Royals missed the playoffs for the first time since the 2018-2019 season. Binkley was hired as Head Coach, shedding the interim title as well adding General Manager to his resume on May 17, 2024.

The Reading Royals announced that they have parted ways / fired Jason Binkley from the Head Coach and General Manager position as of May 27, 2025.

=== 2025–Present: Anthony Peters era ===
On June 20, 2025, the Royals announced that Anthony Peters would be hired as the team's 10th Head Coach and General Manager. Peters most recently served as assistant coach of the Florida Everblades.

== Season-by-season record ==
Regular season										Playoffs					
Season	GP	W	L	OTL	SOL	Pts	GF	GA	Standing	Year	Qualifier	1st round	2nd round	3rd round	Kelly Cup Finals
2001–02	72	27	36	9		63	182	215	6th, Northeast	2002	did not qualify				
2002–03	72	32	35	5		69	261	303	7th, Northeast	2003	did not qualify				
2003–04	72	37	25	10		84	212	189	5th, North	2004	W, 1–0, JHN	W, 3–2, WHL	W, 3–1, PEO	L, 2–3, FLA	—
2004–05	72	43	22	2	5	93	220	161	1st, North	2005		W, 3–1, TOL	L, 1–3, TRE	—	—
2005–06	72	42	23	3	4	91	249	209	3rd, North	2006	BYE	L, 1–3, WHL	—	—	—
2006–07	72	32	33	2	5	71	221	235	6th, North	2007	did not qualify				
2007–08	72	38	26	6	2	84	247	233	3rd, North	2008	BYE	W, 4–2, ELM	L, 3–4, CIN	—	—
2008–09	72	24	42	3	3	54	211	269	7th, North	2009	did not qualify				
2009–10	72	37	29	1	5	80	254	275	2nd, East	2010		W, 3–2, KAL	W, 4–0, FLA	L, 3–4, CIN	—
2010–11	72	44	23	2	3	93	257	220	1st, Atlantic	2011		W, 3–1, CIN	L, 0–4, KAL	—	—
2011–12	72	36	28	4	4	80	229	235	3rd, Atlantic	2012		L, 2–3, ELM	—	—	—
2012–13	72	46	19	3	4	99	246	185	1st, Atlantic	2013		W, 4–2, GRN	W, 4–3, FLA	W, 4–1, CIN	W, 4–1, STK
2013–14	72	46	22	2	2	96	229	182	1st, Atlantic	2014		L, 1–4, FW	—	—	—
2014–15	72	45	21	4	2	96	259	210	3rd, East	2015		L, 3–4, SC	—	—	—
2015–16	72	36	26	6	4	82	222	194	3rd, East	2016		W, 4–3, TOL	L, 3–4, WHL	—	—
2016–17	72	41	25	4	2	88	255	217	2nd, North	2017		L, 2–4, BRM	—	—	—
2017–18	72	39	24	9	0	87	232	199	3rd, North	2018		L, 0–4, MAN	—	—	—
2018–19	72	34	28	4	6	78	229	229	5th, North	2019	did not qualify				
2019–20	60	37	17	5	1	80	218	176	2nd, North	2020	Season cancelled due to the COVID-19 pandemic				
2020–21	Opted out of participating due to the COVID-19 pandemic									2021	did not participate				
2021–22	71	45	17	7	2	99	258	201	1st, North	2022		W, 4–2, MNE	L, 3–4, NFD	—	—
2022–23	72	41	25	5	1	88	262	215	2nd, North	2023		W, 4–2, MNE	L, 1–4, NFD	—	—
2023–24	72	29	35	6	2	66	198	247	6th, North	2024	did not qualify				
2024–25	72	33	28	9	2	77	203	223	4th, North	2025		L, 0–4, TRL	—	—	—
2025–26	72	36	26	8	2	82	199	205	4th, North	2026		L, 1–4, WHL	—	—	—

== Players ==
=== Retired numbers ===
Reading Royals retired numbers
No.	Player	Position	Career	No. retirement
10	Yannick Tifu	C	2012–2014, 2015–2016	2018
22	Larry Courville	LW	2004–2008	2011

== Individual award winners ==
=== All-ECHL Second Team ===
- Adam Comrie: 2012–13, 2015–16
- Matt Willows: 2017–18
- Nolan Zajac: 2017–18
- Eric Knodel: 2019–20

=== ECHL All Rookie Team ===
- T. J. Kemp: 2005–06
- David Vallorani: 2012–13
- Michal Cajkovsky: 2013–14
- Ben Meehan: 2025-2026

=== ECHL Hall of Fame ===
- Derek Clancey, coach, 2003–2005, inducted 2020
