= Josiah Didier =

American ice hockey player (born 1993)

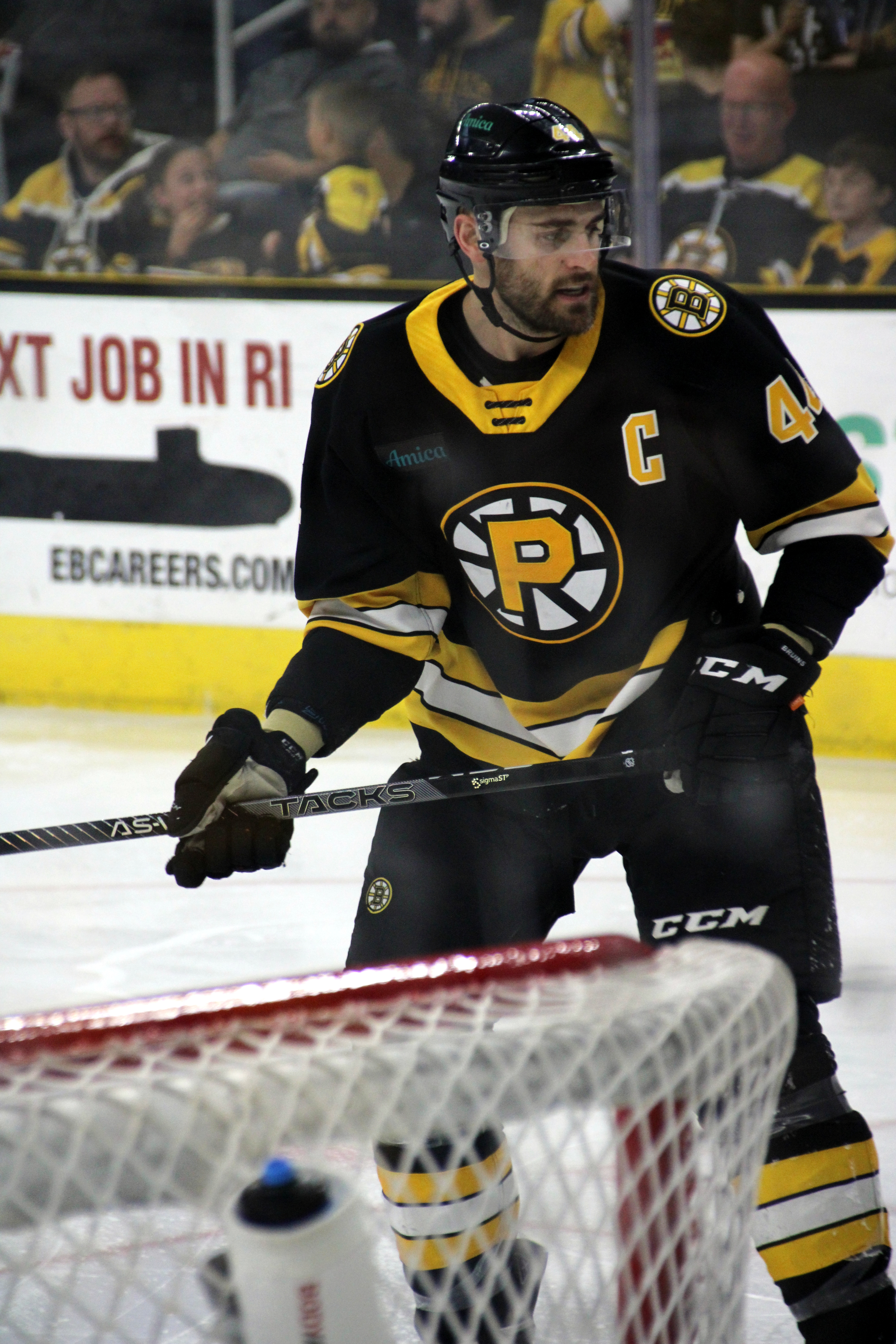
- Didier with the Providence Bruins in 2023
- Born: April 8, 1993 (age 33) Littleton, Colorado
- Height: 6 ft 3 in (191 cm)
- Weight: 218 lb (99 kg; 15 st 8 lb)
- Position: Defense
- Shoots: Right
- SHL team Former teams: IF Björklöven; Hamilton Bulldogs; St. John's IceCaps; Charlotte Checkers; Providence Bruins; Grand Rapids Griffins; Laval Rocket
- NHL draft: 97th overall, 2011; Montreal Canadiens
- Playing career: 2015–present

Josiah Didier (born April 8, 1993) is an American professional ice hockey defenseman for IF Björklöven of the Swedish Hockey League (SHL). He was selected in the fourth round, 97th overall, by the Montreal Canadiens in the 2011 NHL entry draft.

== Playing career ==
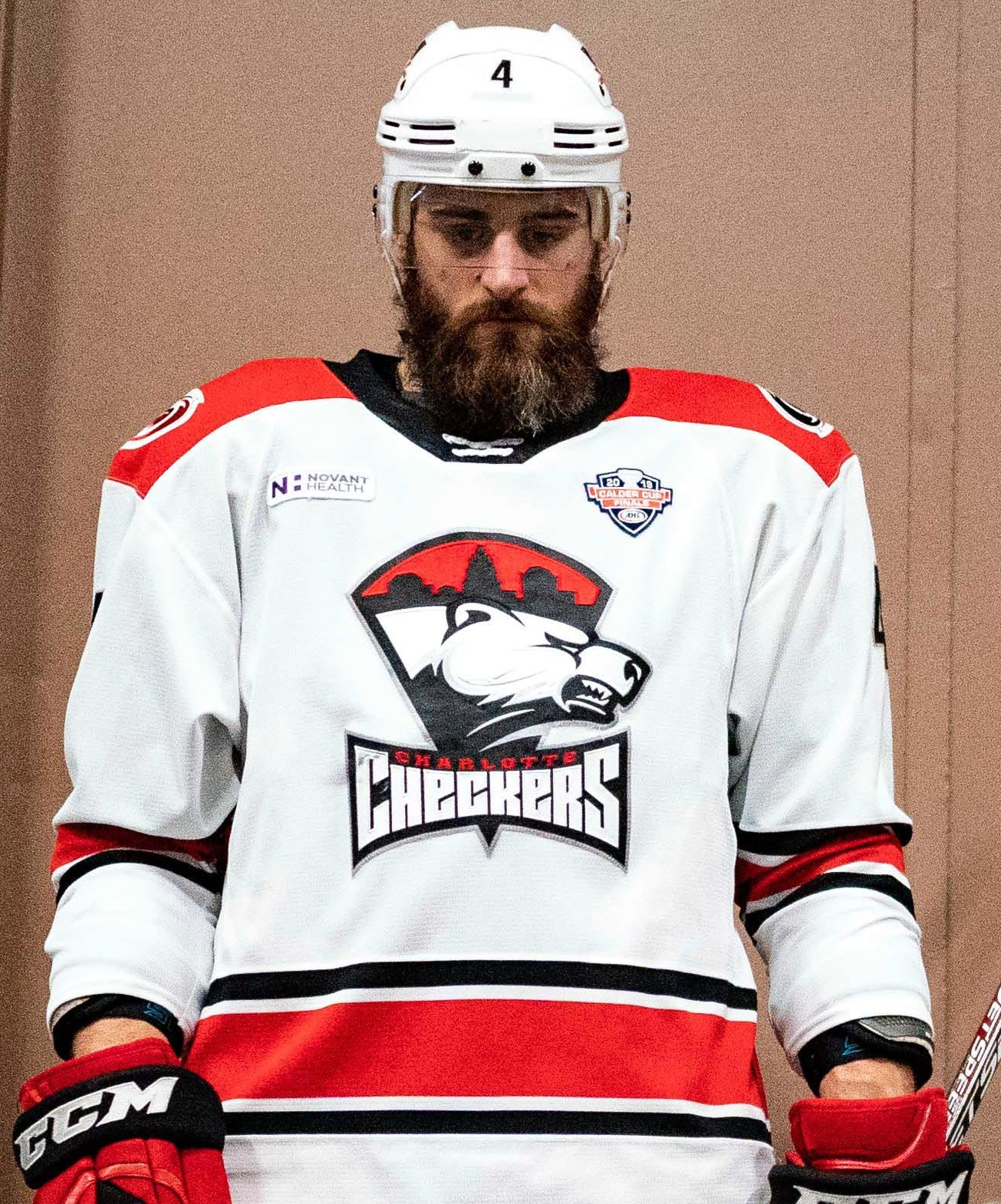
Didier with the Charlotte Checkers in 2019.

Didier played collegiate hockey with the University of Denver of the National Collegiate Athletic Association (NCAA). Following the completion of his four-year tenure with the Pioneers, Didier un-signed from draft team the Montreal Canadiens agreed to a professional tryout (PTO) with affiliate, the Hamilton Bulldogs, to end the 2014–15 season on March 31, 2015.

He continued within the Canadiens organization in signing an AHL contract for the 2015–16 season with new AHL affiliate, the St. John's IceCaps on June 8, 2015.

Following two full season with the Charlotte Checkers, culminating in a Calder Cup championship in the 2018–19 season, he was signed as a free agent by the Providence Bruins on July 1, 2019.

In the 2019–20 season, Didier recorded career bests with 12 goals and 15 points through 61 regular season games, leading the AHL in Plus–minus with +32. He was signed to a two-year contract extension with Providence on January 31, 2020.

On January 1, 2022, during the 2021–22 season, Didier was announced as the 26th captain in Providence Bruins franchise history.

Following four years with Providence, serving as team captain for the last two seasons, he signed a one-year contract with the Grand Rapids Griffins, on July 1, 2023. On October 27, 2023, he was named the 18th captain in Griffins franchise history.

On July 1, 2025, Didier's contract with the Griffins expired. He was not offered a new deal and consequently left the team as an unrestricted free agent. Having played a lone season with the Laval Rocket in 2025–26, Didier after spending his first 12 professional seasons in North America opted sign abroad by agreeing to a one-year contract with newly promoted Swedish club, IF Björklöven of the SHL, on July 24, 2026.

== Career statistics ==
			Regular season					Playoffs
Season	Team	League	GP	G	A	Pts	PIM	GP	G	A	Pts	PIM
2010–11	Cedar Rapids RoughRiders	USHL	58	8	13	21	81	8	0	2	2	7
2011–12	Denver Pioneers	WCHA	41	0	3	3	36	—	—	—	—	—
2012–13	Denver Pioneers	WCHA	31	0	7	7	48	—	—	—	—	—
2013–14	Denver Pioneers	NCHC	36	1	7	8	61	—	—	—	—	—
2014–15	Denver Pioneers	NCHC	40	3	8	11	58	—	—	—	—	—
2014–15	Hamilton Bulldogs	AHL	8	0	1	1	5	—	—	—	—	—
2015–16	St. John's IceCaps	AHL	53	0	5	5	58	—	—	—	—	—
2015–16	Brampton Beast	ECHL	4	1	0	1	4	—	—	—	—	—
2016–17	St. John's IceCaps	AHL	39	2	6	8	25	4	0	0	0	0
2016–17	Brampton Beast	ECHL	1	0	1	1	0	—	—	—	—	—
2017–18	Florida Everblades	ECHL	12	3	4	7	27	—	—	—	—	—
2017–18	Charlotte Checkers	AHL	54	4	5	9	79	5	1	2	3	0
2018–19	Charlotte Checkers	AHL	41	2	8	10	52	19	0	4	4	4
2019–20	Providence Bruins	AHL	61	3	12	15	79	—	—	—	—	—
2020–21	Providence Bruins	AHL	12	0	3	3	9	—	—	—	—	—
2021–22	Providence Bruins	AHL	40	1	2	3	55	2	0	0	0	0
2022–23	Providence Bruins	AHL	69	4	9	13	61	4	0	2	2	2
2023–24	Grand Rapids Griffins	AHL	61	4	4	8	54	5	0	1	1	4
2024–25	Grand Rapids Griffins	AHL	58	2	6	8	53	2	0	0	0	2
2025–26	Laval Rocket	AHL	43	0	5	5	33	5	0	0	0	0
AHL totals			539	22	66	88	563	46	1	9	10	12

== Awards and honors ==
Award	Year
College
WCHA All-Academic Team	2013
AHL
Calder Cup (Charlotte Checkers)	2019
Best P Plus–minus +32	2020
