= Jordan Henry =

Canadian ice hockey player

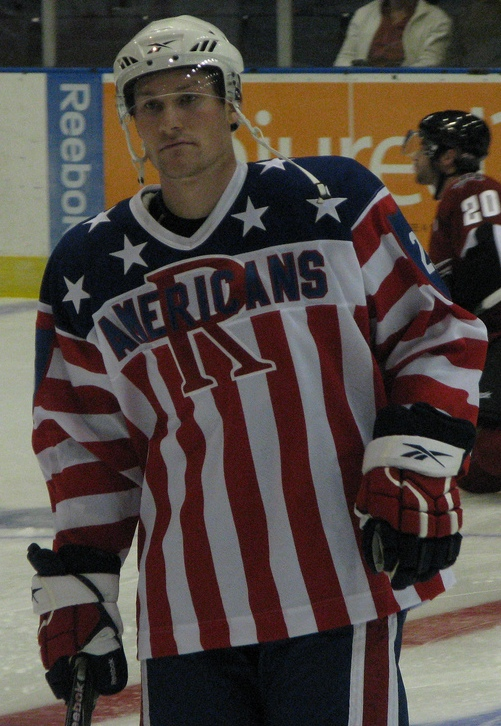
- Henry with the Rochester Americans in 2009
- Born: February 11, 1986 (age 40) Milo, Alberta, Canada
- Height: 6 ft 2 in (188 cm)
- Weight: 198 lb (90 kg; 14 st 2 lb)
- Position: Defence
- Shot: Right
- Played for: Rochester Americans; HC Dynamo Minsk; Abbotsford Heat; Chicago Wolves; Oklahoma City Barons; HPK; Syracuse Crunch; Charlotte Checkers
- NHL draft: Undrafted
- Playing career: 2007–2022

Jordan Henry (born February 11, 1986) is a Canadian former professional ice hockey defenceman.

== Playing career ==
Henry began his career playing for the Moose Jaw Warriors in the WHL for two seasons from 2003 to 2005. In the middle of the 2005–06 season, he was traded to play for the Red Deer Rebels for the remainder of the season. Prior to the 2006–07, as an undrafted free agent, Henry was invited to the Calgary Flames training camp, before returning to the Rebels for the remainder of the season.

After completing his junior career, Henry was invited to and impressed at the Florida Panthers training camp for the 2007–08 season. He was then assigned to ECHL affiliate, the Florida Everblades before signing a three-year entry-level contract with the Panthers on October 8, 2007. Jordan then split his first professional year between the Everblades and Rochester Americans, becoming an Amerks regular by season's end.

On July 9, 2011, Henry was traded by the Panthers to the Calgary Flames for defenceman Keith Seabrook.

On June 27, 2012, Henry, along with a fifth-round draft pick, was traded by the Flames to the Washington Capitals in exchange for the rights to defenseman Dennis Wideman. The Capitals declined to offer Henry a contract and as a free agent he agreed to a try-out with Södertälje SK of the Swedish HockeyAllsvenskan on September 12, 2012. After 7 games with Södertälje into the 2012–13 season, Henry was unable to earn a contract with the club and returned to North America to sign with the ECHL's Stockton Thunder on November 3, 2012.

After two games with the Thunder, Henry was loaned to the AHL affiliate Oklahoma City Barons and registered 2 assists in 20 contests. Upon his return to Stockton, Henry opted for a release from his contract for another venture to Europe in signing for the remainder of the season with Finnish club HPK of the SM-liiga on January 31, 2013.

Henry signed as a free agent and returned to the Florida Everblades of the ECHL on October 3, 2013. Henry was named assistant captain of the team on a vote by the players.

Henry played the last five seasons of his 13-year professional career with the Brampton Beast of the ECHL, before announcing his retirement on July 31, 2020.

== Family ==
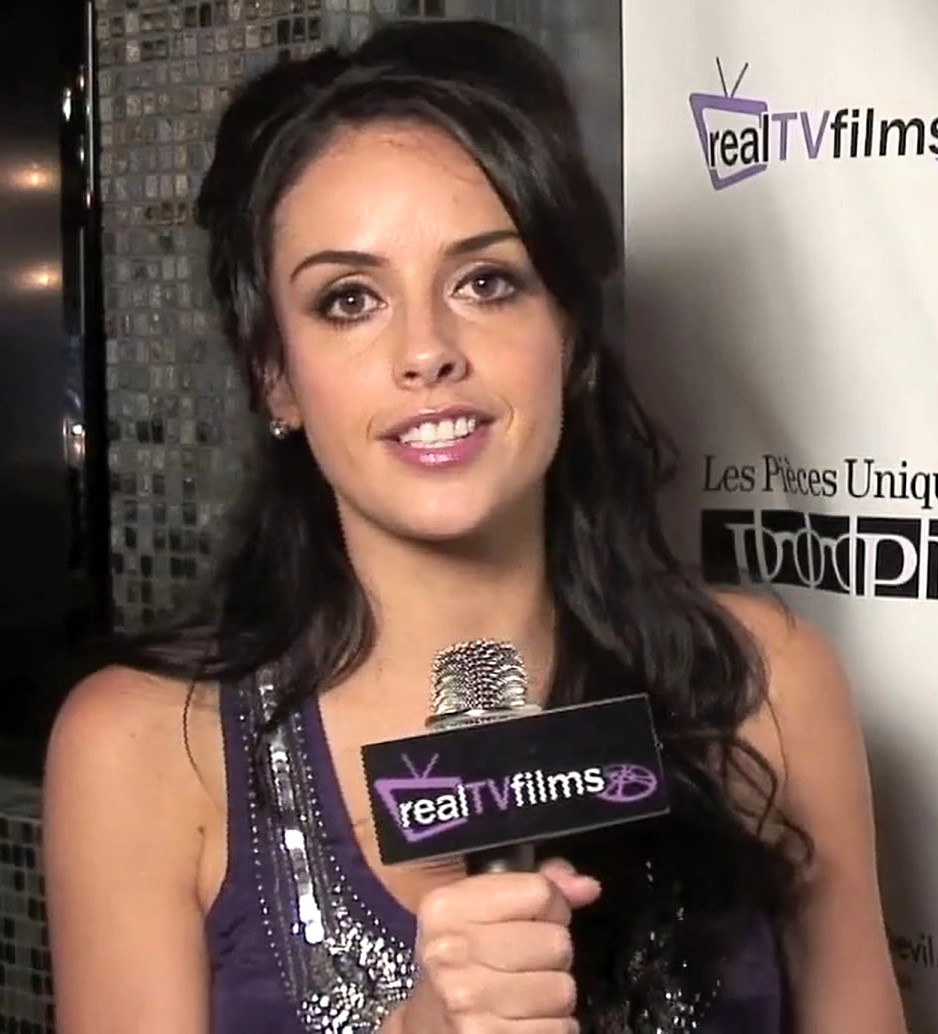
Jessie Sulidis in 2010

Henry's younger brother, Darian (born August 5, 1994), is a defenceman who played in the Western Hockey League. He is married to Jessie Henry (formerly Sulidis), a reality TV personality, since December 22, 2013, with whom he has 2 sons (Jensen and Jett Henry) born in March 2019.

== Career statistics ==
| | | | Regular season | | | | | Playoffs |
| Season | Team | League | GP | G | A | Pts | PIM | GP | G | A | Pts | PIM |
|---|---|---|---|---|---|---|---|---|---|---|---|---|
| 2003–04 | Moose Jaw Warriors | WHL | 61 | 0 | 4 | 4 | 82 | 10 | 0 | 0 | 0 | 6 |
| 2004–05 | Moose Jaw Warriors | WHL | 68 | 2 | 12 | 14 | 137 | 5 | 2 | 0 | 2 | 26 |
| 2005–06 | Moose Jaw Warriors | WHL | 40 | 1 | 12 | 13 | 104 | — | — | — | — | — |
| 2005–06 | Red Deer Rebels | WHL | 29 | 2 | 8 | 10 | 51 | — | — | — | — | — |
| 2006–07 | Red Deer Rebels | WHL | 72 | 7 | 25 | 32 | 162 | 7 | 0 | 4 | 4 | 26 |
| 2007–08 | Florida Everblades | ECHL | 20 | 2 | 2 | 4 | 14 | — | — | — | — | — |
| 2007–08 | Rochester Americans | AHL | 49 | 3 | 5 | 8 | 73 | — | — | — | — | — |
| 2008–09 | Rochester Americans | AHL | 69 | 4 | 12 | 16 | 111 | — | — | — | — | — |
| 2009–10 | Rochester Americans | AHL | 76 | 13 | 18 | 31 | 104 | 7 | 4 | 0 | 4 | 23 |
| 2010–11 | HC Dynamo Minsk | KHL | 36 | 1 | 1 | 2 | 53 | 6 | 1 | 1 | 2 | 33 |
| 2011–12 | Abbotsford Heat | AHL | 52 | 2 | 7 | 9 | 87 | — | — | — | — | — |
| 2011–12 | Chicago Wolves | AHL | 16 | 0 | 2 | 2 | 10 | — | — | — | — | — |
| 2012–13 | Södertälje SK | Allsv | 7 | 1 | 1 | 2 | 8 | — | — | — | — | — |
| 2012–13 | Stockton Thunder | ECHL | 2 | 0 | 2 | 2 | 2 | — | — | — | — | — |
| 2012–13 | Oklahoma City Barons | AHL | 20 | 0 | 2 | 2 | 30 | — | — | — | — | — |
| 2012–13 | HPK | SM-l | 9 | 1 | 1 | 2 | 10 | 4 | 1 | 0 | 1 | 6 |
| 2013–14 | Florida Everblades | ECHL | 34 | 9 | 14 | 23 | 39 | — | — | — | — | — |
| 2013–14 | Syracuse Crunch | AHL | 19 | 0 | 1 | 1 | 16 | — | — | — | — | — |
| 2014–15 | Florida Everblades | ECHL | 35 | 8 | 16 | 24 | 50 | 12 | 0 | 5 | 5 | 25 |
| 2014–15 | Charlotte Checkers | AHL | 5 | 0 | 0 | 0 | 4 | — | — | — | — | — |
| 2015–16 | Brampton Beast | ECHL | 47 | 6 | 13 | 19 | 53 | — | — | — | — | — |
| 2016–17 | Brampton Beast | ECHL | 69 | 17 | 21 | 38 | 74 | 12 | 3 | 6 | 9 | 12 |
| 2016–17 | Rochester Americans | AHL | 1 | 0 | 0 | 0 | 0 | — | — | — | — | — |
| 2017–18 | Brampton Beast | ECHL | 56 | 9 | 20 | 29 | 84 | — | — | — | — | — |
| 2018–19 | Brampton Beast | ECHL | 66 | 15 | 21 | 36 | 67 | 6 | 0 | 3 | 3 | 8 |
| 2019–20 | Brampton Beast | ECHL | 49 | 7 | 4 | 11 | 44 | — | — | — | — | — |
| 2021–22 | Springfield Thunderbirds | AHL | 2 | 0 | 0 | 0 | 0 | — | — | — | — | — |
| ECHL totals | | | 376 | 73 | 113 | 186 | 427 | 30 | 3 | 14 | 17 | 45 |
| AHL totals | | | 309 | 22 | 47 | 69 | 435 | 7 | 4 | 0 | 4 | 23 |
