= Mike McLean (ice hockey) =

Canadian ice hockey player

- Born: January 6, 1986 (age 40) Oshawa, Ontario, Canada
- Height: 6 ft 0 in (183 cm)
- Weight: 179 lb (81 kg; 12 st 11 lb)
- Shot: Left
- Played for: Lake Erie Monsters; Milwaukee Admirals; Coventry Blaze
- NHL draft: Undrafted
- Playing career: 2007–2012

Mike McLean (born January 6, 1986) is a Canadian former professional ice hockey player. He last played for the Coventry Blaze in the Elite Ice Hockey League (EIHL).

== Playing career ==
On August 14, 2008, the Florida Everblades traded McLean to the Dayton Bombers (along with Steve Czech, Jarret Lukin, and future considerations), in exchange for Yannick Tifu.

On August 31, 2010, the Quad City Mallards signed McLean to a try-out agreement. Making the team, McLean went on to score 51 points in 55 games for the Central Hockey League team, and represented the Mallards at the 2011 Central Hockey League All-Star Game.

== Career statistics ==
			Regular season					Playoffs
Season	Team	League	GP	G	A	Pts	PIM	GP	G	A	Pts	PIM
2002–03	Oshawa Legionaires	OPJHL	49	11	23	34	22	—	—	—	—	—
2002–03	Oshawa Generals	OHL	2	1	0	1	0	—	—	—	—	—
2003–04	Oshawa Legionaires	OPJHL	7	4	3	7	2	—	—	—	—	—
2003–04	Oshawa Generals	OHL	11	0	0	0	5	—	—	—	—	—
2003–04	Guelph Storm	OHL	28	0	0	0	4	2	0	0	0	0
2004–05	Guelph Storm	OHL	64	9	15	24	42	4	1	0	1	0
2005–06	Guelph Storm	OHL	67	7	17	24	53	15	5	3	8	6
2006–07	Guelph Storm	OHL	67	29	29	58	26	4	0	3	3	2
2006–07	Kalamazoo Wings	UHL	—	—	—	—	—	15	2	5	7	4
2007–08	Elmira Jackals	ECHL	6	0	2	2	2	—	—	—	—	—
2007–08	Florida Everblades	ECHL	54	9	13	22	28	2	0	0	0	0
2008–09	Dayton Bombers	ECHL	47	17	29	46	22	—	—	—	—	—
2008–09	Lake Erie Monsters	AHL	25	4	8	12	8	—	—	—	—	—
2009–10	Cincinnati Cyclones	ECHL	35	10	11	21	15	—	—	—	—	—
2009–10	Milwaukee Admirals	AHL	6	0	0	0	0	—	—	—	—	—
2009–10	Gwinnett Gladiators	ECHL	31	6	11	17	12	—	—	—	—	—
2010–11	Quad City Mallards	CHL	55	18	33	51	25	4	0	2	2	2
2010–11	Milwaukee Admirals	AHL	2	0	0	0	0	—	—	—	—	—
2011–12	Coventry Blaze	EIHL	62	8	27	35	28	2	0	1	1	0
AHL totals			33	4	8	12	8	—	—	—	—	—

== Awards and honours ==
Award	Year
2011 Central Hockey League All-Star Game	2010–11
