= Chris Beckford-Tseu =

Canadian ice hockey player (born 1984)

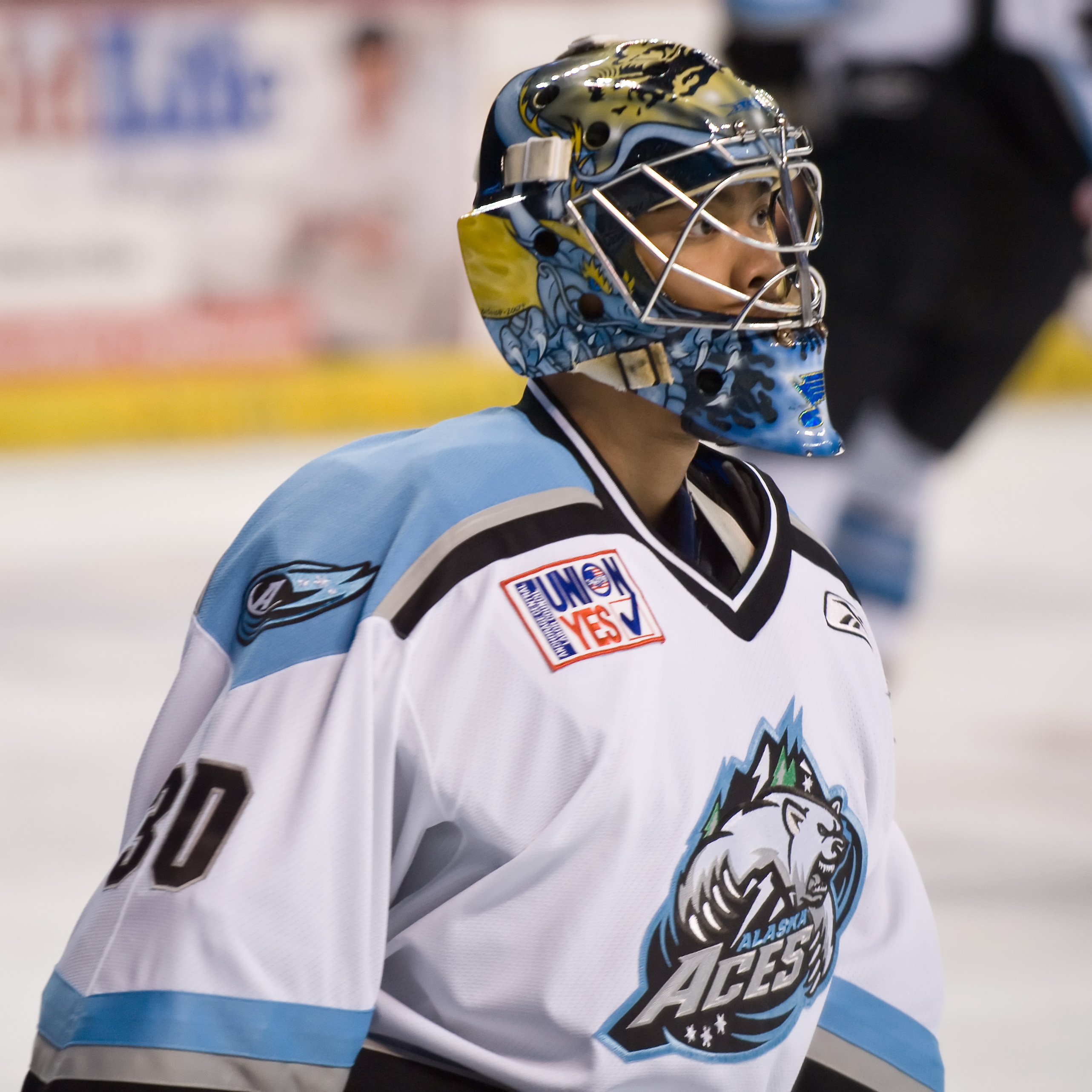
- Born: June 22, 1984 (age 42) Scarborough, Ontario, Canada
- Height: 6 ft 4 in (193 cm)
- Weight: 205 lb (93 kg; 14 st 9 lb)
- Position: Goaltender
- Caught: Left
- Played for: St. Louis Blues
- NHL draft: 159th overall, 2003; St. Louis Blues
- Playing career: 2004–2011

Chris Beckford-Tseu (born June 22, 1984) is a Canadian former professional ice hockey goaltender. He played one game in the National Hockey League (NHL) with the St. Louis Blues during the 2007–08 season. The rest of his career, which lasted from 2004 to 2011, was spent in the minor leagues. He was drafted in the fifth round, 159th overall, by the Blues in the 2003 NHL entry draft.

== Playing career ==
As a youth, Beckford-Tseu played in the 1998 Quebec International Pee-Wee Hockey Tournament with a minor ice hockey team from Vaughan, Ontario.

Beckford-Tseu began his career playing in the Ontario Hockey League. He was drafted 91st overall in the 2000 OHL Priority Draft. He played for the Guelph Storm, the Oshawa Generals and the Kingston Frontenacs. His best OHL year was with the Generals in 2002-03, where he had 25 wins and a 3.16 GAA.

In 2003, he was chosen 159th overall by the St. Louis Blues in the NHL Entry Draft.

In 2004, Beckford-Tseu started his professional career by appearing with the Peoria Rivermen, the Blues AHL affiliate. During the 2004-05 season, he accumulated a 2.71 GAA and a .908 SV% backing up Alfie Michaud.

=== NHL ===
Beckford-Tseu played in his only NHL game on February 21, 2008 against the Los Angeles Kings. In that game, he saved 8 shots out of 9.

The Panthers signed him as a free agent on July 3, 2008.

Beckford-Tseu played for the Worcester IceCats, Alaska Aces, Peoria Rivermen, and Rochester Americans.

=== Post career ===
Beckford-Tseu is currently the Goaltender Coach for Toronto Metropolitan University men's hockey team, the TMU Bold. As well, he also started a program called "Professional Goaltending Development" where he, and former AHL player Rob Gherson, train young goalies.

== Playing style ==
At 6’4”, Beckford-Tseu is a large man who generally covers a lot of net. Despite that size, he tends not to challenge the shooters. He also is known to have good reflexes.

== Career statistics ==
=== Regular season and playoffs ===
			Regular season										Playoffs
Season	Team	League	GP	W	L	T	OTL	MIN	GA	SO	GAA	SV%	GP	W	L	MIN	GA	SO	GAA	SV%
2000–01	St. Michael's Buzzers	OJHL	25	9	15	1	—	1506	119	1	4.75	—	4	1	3	240	10	0	2.50	—
2001–02	Guelph Storm	OHL	5	2	0	0	—	207	16	0	4.64	.818	—	—	—	—	—	—	—	—
2001–02	Oshawa Generals	OHL	7	2	3	0	—	341	19	0	3.34	.900	5	1	4	310	16	0	3.10	.902
2002–03	Oshawa Generals	OHL	54	25	26	2	—	2978	157	4	3.16	.891	13	6	7	727	48	1	3.96	.878
2003–04	Oshawa Generals	OHL	9	1	5	2	—	495	28	0	3.39	.888	—	—	—	—	—	—	—	—
2003–04	Kingston Frontenacs	OHL	40	16	19	2	—	2226	121	3	3.26	.911	5	1	4	303	18	0	3.56	.918
2004–05	Worcester IceCats	AHL	1	0	0	0	—	29	0	0	0.00	1.000	—	—	—	—	—	—	—	—
2004–05	Peoria Rivermen	ECHL	29	11	12	3	—	1594	72	1	2.71	.908	—	—	—	—	—	—	—	—
2005–06	Peoria Rivermen	AHL	16	7	5	—	1	737	38	0	3.10	.885	4	0	4	238	15	0	3.78	.872
2005–06	Alaska Aces	ECHL	19	16	1	—	2	1152	36	2	1.87	.929	12	8	4	795	27	3	2.04	.930
2006–07	Peoria Rivermen	AHL	29	12	11	—	4	1654	75	1	2.72	.900	—	—	—	—	—	—	—	—
2006–07	Alaska Aces	ECHL	7	7	0	—	0	426	9	2	1.27	.950	—	—	—	—	—	—	—	—
2007–08	St. Louis Blues	NHL	1	0	0	—	0	27	1	0	2.25	.889	—	—	—	—	—	—	—	—
2007–08	Peoria Rivermen	AHL	34	15	14	—	2	1871	82	1	2.63	.899	—	—	—	—	—	—	—	—
2007–08	Alaska Aces	ECHL	16	12	4	—	0	921	36	1	2.34	.923	2	0	2	99	7	0	4.27	.887
2008–09	Rochester Americans	AHL	22	3	14	—	1	1112	73	0	3.94	.870	—	—	—	—	—	—	—	—
2008–09	Florida Everblades	ECHL	1	0	0	—	1	65	5	0	4.62	.857	—	—	—	—	—	—	—	—
2008–09	Phoenix Roadrunners	ECHL	11	2	7	—	1	577	49	0	5.09	.863	—	—	—	—	—	—	—	—
2009–10	Rochester Americans	AHL	6	0	4	—	0	296	23	0	4.66	.869	—	—	—	—	—	—	—	—
2009–10	Florida Everblades	ECHL	38	19	11	—	4	2145	114	2	3.19	.903	9	3	5	467	30	0	3.85	.889
2010–11	Victoria Salmon Kings	ECHL	8	1	5	—	0	383	31	0	4.86	.832	—	—	—	—	—	—	—	—
2010–11	Greenville Road Warriors	ECHL	5	4	1	—	0	300	8	1	1.60	.940	4	2	2	264	7	1	1.59	.920
NHL totals			1	0	0	—	0	27	1	0	2.25	.889	—	—	—	—	—	—	—	—

== See also ==
- List of players who played only one game in the NHL
