= Sam Klassen =

Canadian-German ice hockey player

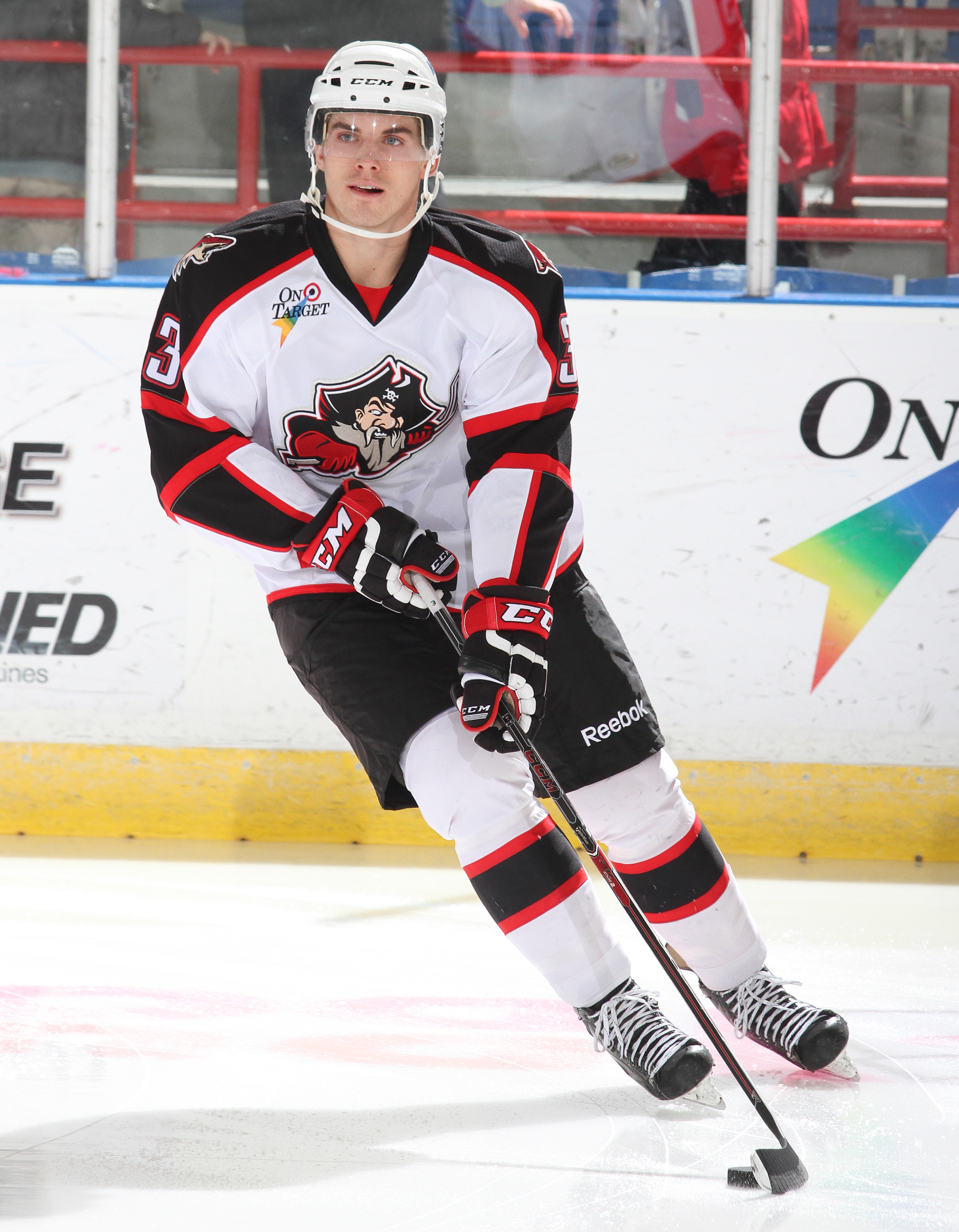
- Klassen with the Portland Pirates in 2014
- Born: January 1, 1989 (age 37) Watrous, Saskatchewan, Canada
- Height: 6 ft 1 in (185 cm)
- Weight: 194 lb (88 kg; 13 st 12 lb)
- Position: Defence
- Shot: Left
- Played for: Connecticut Whale; Hartford Wolf Pack; Portland Pirates; Hamburg Freezers; Straubing Tigers
- NHL draft: Undrafted
- Playing career: 2010–2018

Sam Klassen (born January 1, 1989) is a Canadian-German former professional ice hockey defenceman who most recently played with the Straubing Tigers of the Deutsche Eishockey Liga (DEL). Klassen holds dual citizenship in Canada and Germany.

== Career ==
Prior to turning professional, Klassen played major junior hockey in the Western Hockey League with the Saskatoon Blades.

On July 27, 2009, the New York Rangers signed Klassen as a free agent to a three-year entry-level contract. Throughout the duration of his contract with the Rangers, Klassen was assigned to American Hockey League affiliate, the Connecticut Whale. Swinging between the Whale and ECHL's Greenville Road Warriors, Klassen played 114 AHL games and 131 ECHL contests between 2010 and 2013. In December 2013, he joined the Hartford Wolf Pack on a Professional Tryout (PTO) deal and moved on to fellow AHL team Portland Pirates in March 2014.

On July 17, 2014, Klassen agreed to his first contract abroad, signing a two-year contract with German club, the Hamburg Freezers of the DEL. He retired from professional ice hockey at the end of the 2015-16 season, but returned to the game in the 2017-18 season, after signing with the Straubing Tigers in late March 2017.

== Awards and honours ==
Award	Year
SJHL Champion with the Humboldt Broncos	2006–07
