= Brampton Beast =

Defunct Canadian minor-league professional ice hockey team

- City: Brampton, Ontario
- League: ECHL
- Conference: Eastern
- Division: North
- Founded: 2013 (in the CHL)
- Folded: 2021
- Home arena: CAA Centre
- Colours: Black, silver, red, white
- Owners: Gurmeet Singh, Phil Fusco, Gregg Rosen
- General manager: Cary Kaplan
- Head coach: Spiros Anastas
- Affiliates: Montreal Canadiens; Ottawa Senators; Tampa Bay Lightning

Franchise history
- 2013–2020: Brampton Beast

The Brampton Beast were a professional ice hockey team based in Brampton, Ontario, Canada. The team originally played in the Central Hockey League for one year during the 2013–14 season prior to the league's folding before joining the ECHL from 2014 to 2020. The Beast played their home games at the CAA Centre. The team was one of only two ECHL members located in Canada, along with the Newfoundland Growlers, from 2018 to 2020. Due to the COVID-19 pandemic, the Beast voluntarily suspended operations through at least the 2020–21 ECHL season, then ceased operations entirely.

== History ==
=== Foundation ===
From 1998 to 2013, Brampton was home to the Ontario Hockey League's Brampton Battalion, a major junior hockey team. The Battalion relocated to North Bay, Ontario, in the 2013 off-season after several years of low attendance and financial struggles. On January 23, 2013, the Central Hockey League announced that it had signed a Letter of Intent with the ownership group led by Gregg Rosen, former Kingston Voyageurs owner, and president of KIMCO Steel in Kingston. Minority owner, Cary Kaplan, would serve as the president and general manager. The lease was officially signed and the agreement executed on March 8, 2013.

On April 22, the Beast announced that Brampton native and former Fayetteville FireAntz coach, the 2012 SPHL coach of the year, Mark DeSantis would serve as the team's first head coach. DeSantis named former Brampton Battalion player and former teammate, Brent Hughes, as Beast assistant coach.

In June 2013, the Beast announced its first player signed was Brett Smith, the former assistant captain of the Fort Wayne Komets and member of the CHL Championship team in 2011. Cal Wild and Jason Pitton were announced on July 9, 2013. Defenceman Michael Couch and right winger Tylor Michel were signed on August 16, 2013. On August 30, 2013, the Beast added two forwards, former New York Islander Rob Collins and defending SPHL League MVP Josh McQuade. On September 28, 2013, the Beast mascot "Boomer" was born.

=== First seasons ===
The 2013–14 schedule was released on July 26, 2013 and featured the Beast playing the first CHL game on Canadian soil against the Arizona Sundogs on October 18, 2013. The Beast would finish the season with 15 of their final 19 games at home, more than any other team. On August 22, 2013, Tampa Bay Lightning general manager Steve Yzerman announced that the Lightning of the National Hockey League and the Syracuse Crunch of the American Hockey League would affiliate with the Brampton Beast for the 2013–14 season. The Beast retired #7 in honour of the Brampton Beast fans being "the 7th man" during their first home game vs. the Arizona Sundogs.

For the team's second season in 2014, head coach Mark DeSantis was replaced by his assistant Brent Hughes as the team's new head coach and Cal Wild was named the team's second captain. Key signings included former Toronto Maple Leaf, Phil Oreskovic, former ECHL MVP and OHL scoring leader Tyler Donati, 2013 Beast scoring leader Jason Pitton, perennial point a game player Chad Painchaud, former Battalion players Stephon Thorne and Jason Dale, former Kalamazoo Wings captain Elgin Reid, Florida Everblades goaltender Trevor Cann. Mike MacIsaac, Grant Rollheiser, Brayden Rose and Andrew Darrigo returned for their second season with the Beast.

=== Move to ECHL ===
On October 7, 2014, not long before the 2014–15 season was set to begin, it was announced that the Central Hockey League had ceased operations. The Beast, along with the Allen Americans, Quad City Mallards, Missouri Mavericks, Rapid City Rush, Tulsa Oilers and Wichita Thunder, were all approved for expansion membership into the ECHL for the 2014–15 season.

The Beast finished their inaugural ECHL season on April 12, 2015 against the Wheeling Nailers. Captain Cal Wild was awarded the ECHL Community Player of the Year, one year after winning the Central Hockey League's Man of the Year award. Jason Pitton's second successful season with the Beast made him the all-time franchise scorer, in addition to leader of a number of other statistical categories (all-time goals, assists, points, shots on goal). Chad Painchaud was recognized as February's ECHL Player of the Month after scoring 17 goals - including three hat-tricks and a four-goal game - in addition to three assists for 20 points during the month. However, the team finished 25th out of 28 teams and fired head coach Brent Hughes after the end of the season.

On May 5, 2015, the Beast announced Colin Chaulk, former Kalamazoo Wings assistant coach and former long time captain of the Fort Wayne Komets, had been hired as the new head coach for the 2015–16 season. On May 28, 2015, the Beast announced their affiliation with the National Hockey League's Montreal Canadiens and the American Hockey League's St. John's IceCaps.

For the 2015–16 season, the Beast had a number of major signings. Significant among them former NHLer and prolific Battalion defenceman Mike Vernace, ECHL Scoring Champion (2014) and CHL MVP (2012) Brandon Marino, top ECHL goal scorer and championship winner Chris Auger, AHL veteran and ECHL captain Jordan Henry. Back with the team were captain Cal Wild (until he retired), the league's top rookie scoring defenceman Matthew Maione, and the return of the Beast first season's points per game leader, Scott Howes. Montreal Canadiens provided several players to the Beast team in 2015 during the season, notably veteran standout AHL goalie Eddie Pasquale, and Travis Brown, as well as draft picks Tim Bozon, Dalton Thrower, Josiah Didier, and Stefan Fournier.

After being the only player to appear in all three Beast seasons, as well as being named captain in each season and two-time Brampton Beast's Man of the Year, Cal Wild announced his retirement on November 22, 2015. He retired second in both career and points and games played, behind only Jason Pitton in both categories.

=== Final years ===
In January 2016, the team asked the Brampton City Council for a financial partnership to operate out of the Powerade Centre for the 2016–17 season noting that the City's lack of ownership stake in the building is a significant impediment to running a viable hockey franchise. General manager Cary Kaplan stated that if the team and city are unable to come to an agreement to help offset the team's financial losses, the team would not play the next season. On March 9, 2016, the city council agreed in an 8-2 vote to a three-year sponsorship agreement of $1.5 million to help mitigate the predicted financial losses. This money will be refunded to the city if the team earns a profit.

The 2016–17 season had the most returning players in Beast history, led by captain Brandon Marino, Jordan Henry, Luke Pither, Luc Blain, Chris Auger and Tim Billingsley. Free agent signings included top-ten scorer David Pacan, and former team leaders in scoring David Vallorani and Brandon MacLean. They were joined by several top Montreal Canadiens draft picks, namely Zachary Fucale, Connor Crisp, and Dalton Thrower for much of the season. The season was the most successful of its first four with the team's winning percentage increasing from 0.396 to 0.611. The Beast won 40 games, finished tied for second in Northern Division, and defeated the Reading Royals in six games in the Division Semifinals. David Pacan led the ECHL in goals with 41 while David Vallorani was fifth in the league in scoring with 83 points and named an ECHL second team all-star. The team lost in the Division Finals to the Manchester Monarchs. Off the ice, the Beast's attendance increased 12%, and 21% over two seasons. With an average of 3,106 fans per game, it marked the first time in the 19-year history of Brampton hockey (Battalion for 15 years, and Beast for four), that average attendance exceeded 3,000 fans per game.

The 2017–18 has a league high 17 returning players and is the oldest team in the ECHL with an average age exceeding 27. Returning players were led by all-time scoring leader and team captain Brandon Marino, assistant captains Jordan Henry and Brendan MacLean, and career total games played leader Luc Blain. During the season, scoring leader David Vallorani, former NHL player David Ling, and goalie Zachary Fucale returned to the team. The Montreal Canadiens entered their third season as affiliate, while the Ottawa Senators also occasionally sent players to the Beast due to not having an ECHL affiliate and the proximity of their new AHL team, the Belleville Senators.

The Canadiens did not renew their annual affiliation for 2018–19 and the Beast signed a one-year affiliation with the Ottawa Senators and the Belleville Senators. After the 2018–19 season, head coach Colin Chaulk was promoted to the Belleville Senators as an assistant. Spiros Anastas was hired as the franchise's fourth head coach, spending the previous season as head coach of the South Carolina Stingrays.

The Beast were one of several teams to opt out of the 2020–21 season amidst the restrictions in the COVID-19 pandemic. In January 2021, the team announced a partnership with the National Women's Hockey League's Toronto Six with the expectation of holding joint camps, practices, fan events, and double headers together, with Beast general manager Cary Kaplan stating that "We feel that we have a lot in common, as many people have still not appreciated or experienced both the exceptional level of hockey in the ECHL, or the equally strong fan experience that the Beast provide." While the Beast where on hiatus, head coach Anastas joined the Six as an assistant coach for their bubble season in Lake Placid, New York.

On February 18, 2021, the Beast announced that the team had completely ceased operations and would not be returning for the 2021–22 season.

== Team name ==
On January 30, the team officially announced a name-the-team contest, with the final ten names being announced on March 19, 2013. The final two of ten finalists were Brampton Beast and Brampton Bandits, (eliminated April 10, 2013). The other finalists were Arrows (eliminated March 27), Bengals (eliminated March 22), Blizzard (eliminated April 3), North Stars (eliminated April 4), Renegades (eliminated March 28), Smash (eliminated March 21), Vipers (eliminated April 5), and Wolverines (eliminated March 29).

The Brampton Beast name was announced as the winner on April 10. The name was submitted by four fans including Joseph Stephen and his son Alexander. The team logo and colours were released at City Hall in front of 350 fans on Saturday April 27. The team colours are silver, black, red, & white.

== Season-by-season record ==
Regular season											Playoffs				
Season	GP	W	L	OTL	SOL	Pts	GF	GA	PIM	Standing	Year	1st round	2nd round	3rd round	Finals
Central Hockey League
2013–14	66	33	26	3	4	73	209	226	1000	6th, CHL	2014	—	L, 1–4, ALN	—	—
ECHL
2014–15	72	23	46	3	0	49	181	298	1144	7th, Central	2015	did not qualify			
2015–16	72	23	38	7	4	57	179	255	932	4th, North	2016	did not qualify			
2016–17	72	40	24	3	5	88	263	256	868	3rd, North	2017	W, 4–2, REA	L, 2–4, MAN	—	—
2017–18	72	28	34	6	4	66	210	245	967	6th, North Div.	2018	did not qualify			
2018–19	72	36	29	5	2	79	241	217	813	4th, North	2019	L, 2–4, NFL	—	—	—
2019–20	62	34	25	3	1	71	229	206	805	3rd, North Div.	2020	Season cancelled			

== Players and personnel ==
=== Team captains ===
- Brett Smith — 2013
- Cal Wild — 2013–2015
- Jordan Henry — 2015–2016; (Note: as acting captain when Marino was called up) 2019–2020
- Brandon Marino — 2015–2019

=== Head coaches ===
- Mark Desantis — 2013–2014
- Brent Hughes — 2014–2015
- Colin Chaulk — 2015–2019
- Spiros Anastas — 2019–2020

=== Retired numbers ===
7 - Fans (In honour of the fans of Brampton - being the "7th Man").

== Franchise records and leaders ==
=== Team career records ===
- Games played (regular season): Jordan Henry — 287
- Goals: David Vallorani — 101
- Assists: Brandon Marino — 156
- Points: David Vallorani — 249
- PIM: Jordan Henry — 322
- Shots on goal: Jason Pitton — 382
- Points per game: Rob Collins — 1.179
- Wins: Zachary Fucale — 30

=== Single season records ===
- Games played: David Vallorani & Brandon Marino — 72 (2016–17)
- Goals: David Pacan — 41 (2016–17)
- Assists: Brandon Marino — 52 (2016–17)
- Points: David Vallorani — 83 (2016–17)
- Plus/Minus: Jordan Henry and Matt Petgrave — +25 (2016–17 and 2018–19)
- PIM: Stefan Fournier — 145 (2017–18)
- Shots on goal: Nathan Todd — 269 (2018–19)
- Most Points (D): Matthew Maione — 43 (2014–15)
- Most Goals (D): Jordan Henry — 17 (2016–17)
- Points per game: Scott Howes — 1.25 (2013–14)
- Wins: Zachary Fucale — 25 (2016–17)
- Goals Against Average: Chris Driedger — 2.55 (2017–18 over 17 games)

=== Playoff records ===
- Goals: Brandon Maclean (2016–17) and Daniel Ciampini — 4 (2018–19)
- Assists: Jordan Henry & Luke Pither — 6 (2016–17)
- Points: Jordan Henry — 9 (2016–17)
- Plus/Minus: Luc Blain — +3 (2016–17)
- Shots on Goal: Jordan Henry — 51 (2016–17)
- Wins: Zachary Fucale — 6 (2016–17)
- GAA: Zachary Fucale — 2.13 (2016–17)
- Save %: Zachary Fucale — 0.932 (2016–17)
