= Wings Event Center =

Multi-purpose arena in Kalamazoo, Michigan

Coordinates: 42°15′13″N 85°32′7″W

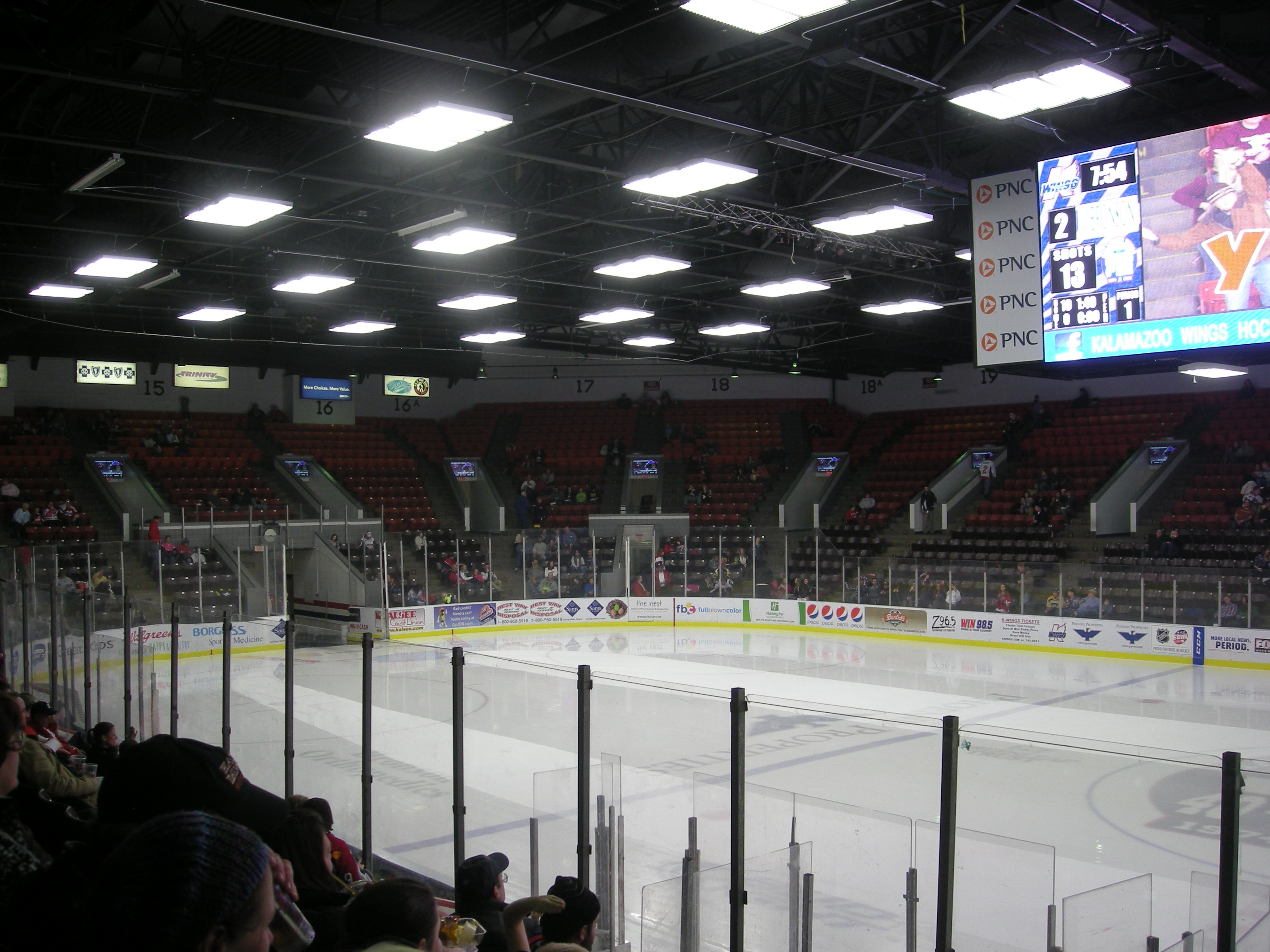

- Location within Michigan Location within the United States
- Former names: Wings Stadium (1974–2015)
- Location: 3600 Vanrick Drive; Kalamazoo, Michigan 49001
- Owner: Stadium Management Company/Greenleaf Hospitality
- Operator: Stadium Management Company/Greenleaf Hospitality
- Capacity: 5,113 (Ice Hockey, Indoor Football, Basketball); 6,323 (Other)
- Surface: Ice

Construction
- Groundbreaking: February 1974
- Opened: October 30, 1974
- Architect: Richard A. Schramm

Tenants
- Kalamazoo Wings (IHL) (1974–1995); Kalamazoo Kangaroos (AISA) (1984–1986); Kalamazoo Wings (ECHL) (2000–present); Kalamazoo Xplosion (CIFL) (2007–2008)

Wings Event Center (formerly Wings Stadium) is a 5,113-seat multi-purpose arena located in Kalamazoo, Michigan. The arena, opened in 1974, is home to the Kalamazoo Wings, an ice hockey team in the ECHL. The arena changed the name to the Wings Event Center on March 25, 2015 to market the arena's other hosting capabilities to companies and promoters.

The complex features four concession stands and two bars along the concourse, as well as the Underground Sports Bar. The main arena is a part of a sports and convention complex serving southwest Michigan.

As a concert venue, the arena can seat up to 6,323 spectators; as a convention center it can accommodate 17,000 square feet (1,600 m^{2}) of trade show and exhibit space. Along with numerous concerts, the arena has also hosted a number of pro wrestling events from World Wrestling Entertainment (WWE) and Ring of Honor (ROH). On April 8, 1992, the facility hosted a World Wrestling Federation (WWF) taping of its Superstars TV show, as well as other shows including Prime Time Wrestling and All American Wrestling. The Superstars episodes later aired on April 18, 1992, with additional episodes airing April 25 and May 2, 1992. The French version of Superstars aired on June 3, 1992. The April 18th edition is notable for being the first usage of the 'Superstars' only title, after the company dropped the previous name 'Superstars of Wrestling'. Meanwhile, the All American Wrestling episode aired April 19, 1992. The Prime Time Wrestling episodes aired April 20, 27 and June 22, 1992. It was at these tapings that The Ultimate Warrior had what would become his first televised match since leaving the WWF the previous year. He defeated Skinner in a bout that would air on the 5/2/92 Superstars.

In 1989, the Valley (formerly known as the Annex), seating 1,367 for hockey and up to 2,850 for other events, was added; it also has 17,000 square feet (1,600 m^{2}) of arena floor space and can be used for hockey, curling, trade shows, conventions and other events. It also has a 3,166-square-foot (294 m^{2}) viewing area.

The Zoo (formerly known as the Cube), the third arena in the complex, was added in 1997, and is used for hockey and trade shows; its arena floor also measures 17,000 square feet (1,600 m^{2}), bringing the total exhibit space to 51,000 square feet (4,700 m^{2}). There is also a 5,800-square-foot (540 m^{2}) viewing area at the arena.

The complex has a 2,500-square-foot (230 m^{2}) lobby and a 500-square-foot (46 m^{2}) hospitality room, a separate concession stand and a bar called the Icehouse by Old Burdick's, which overlooks the Annex.

== Gallery ==
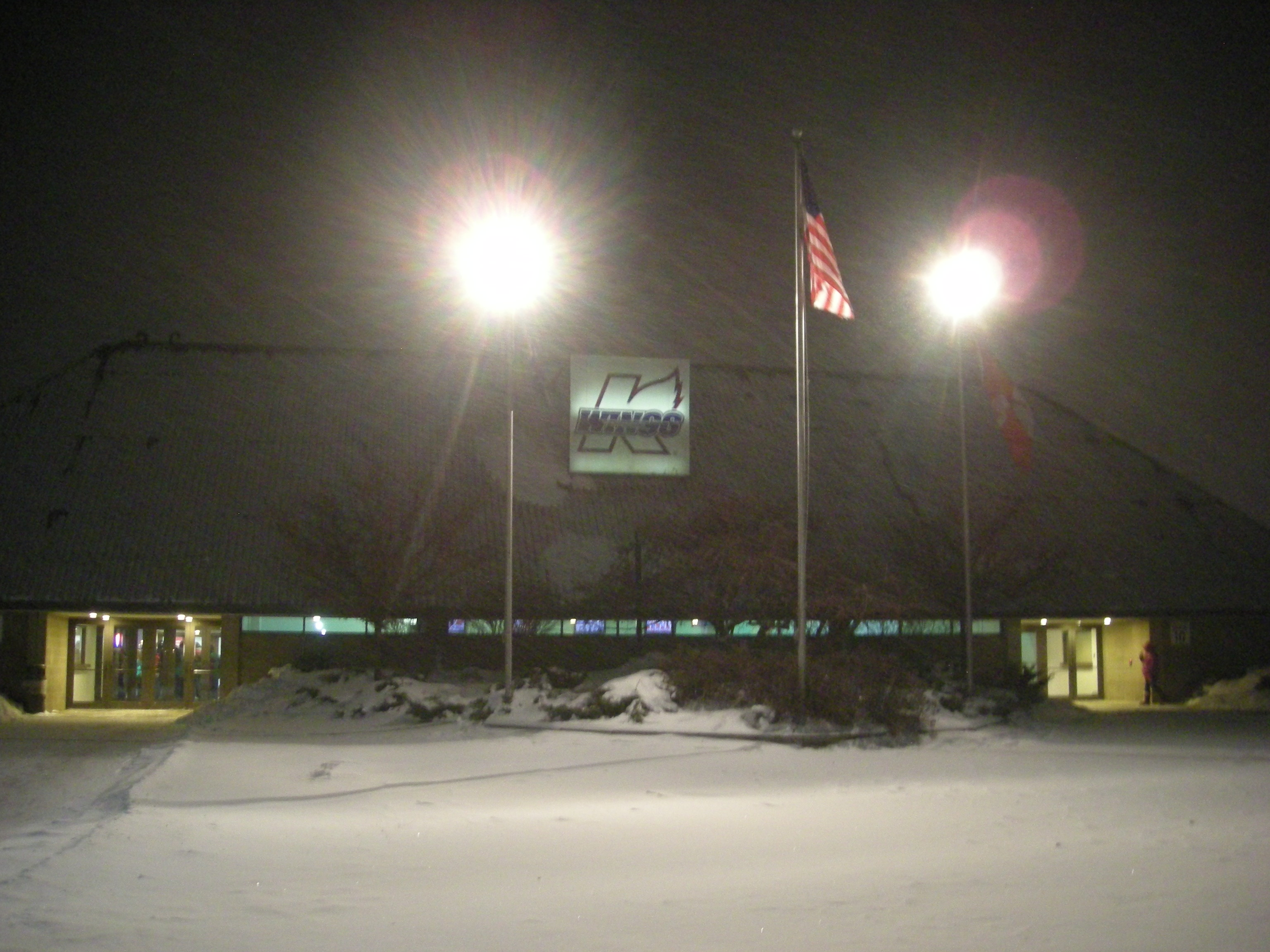
Wings Event Center Arena exterior

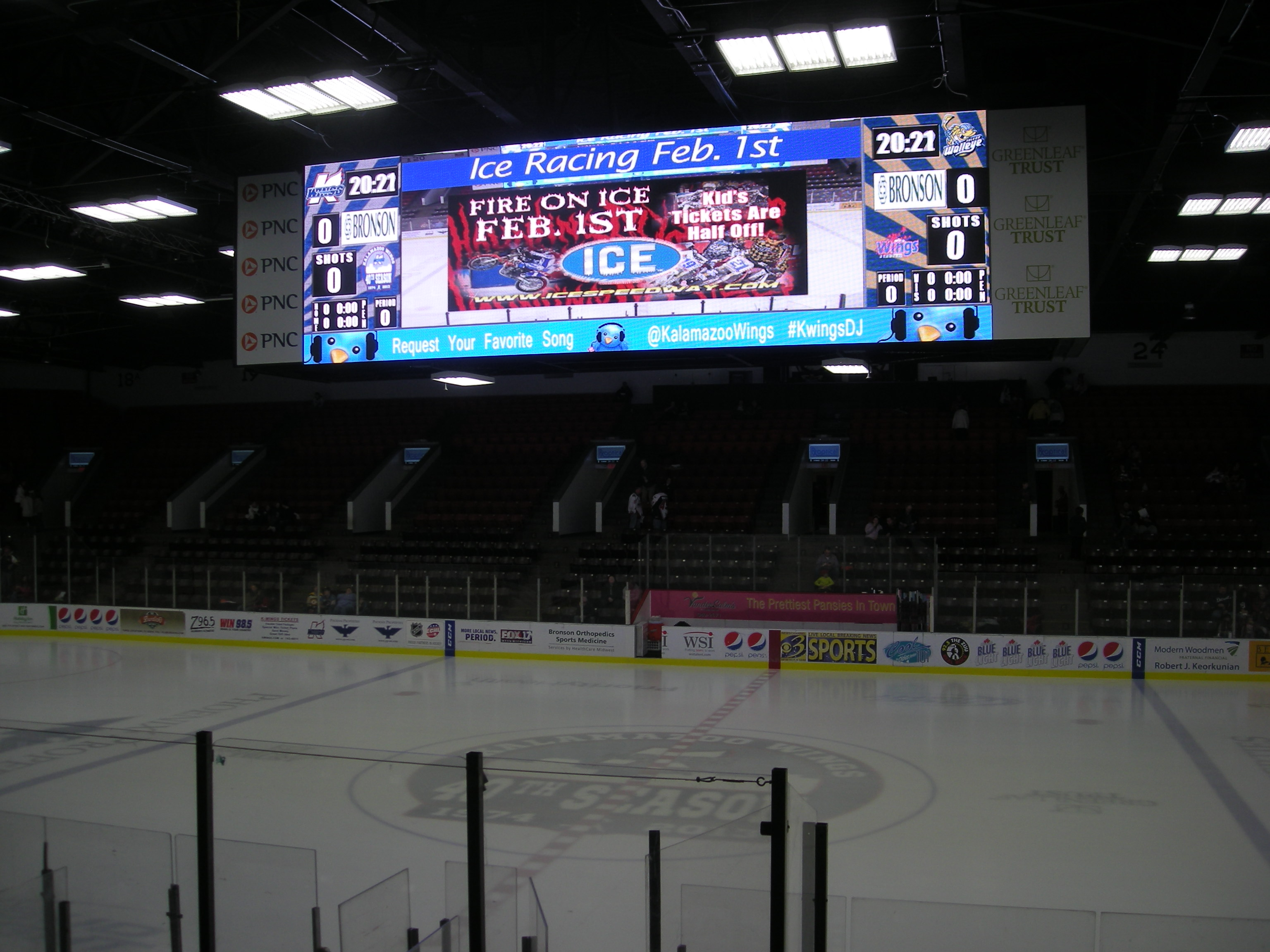
Wings Event Center Arena interior

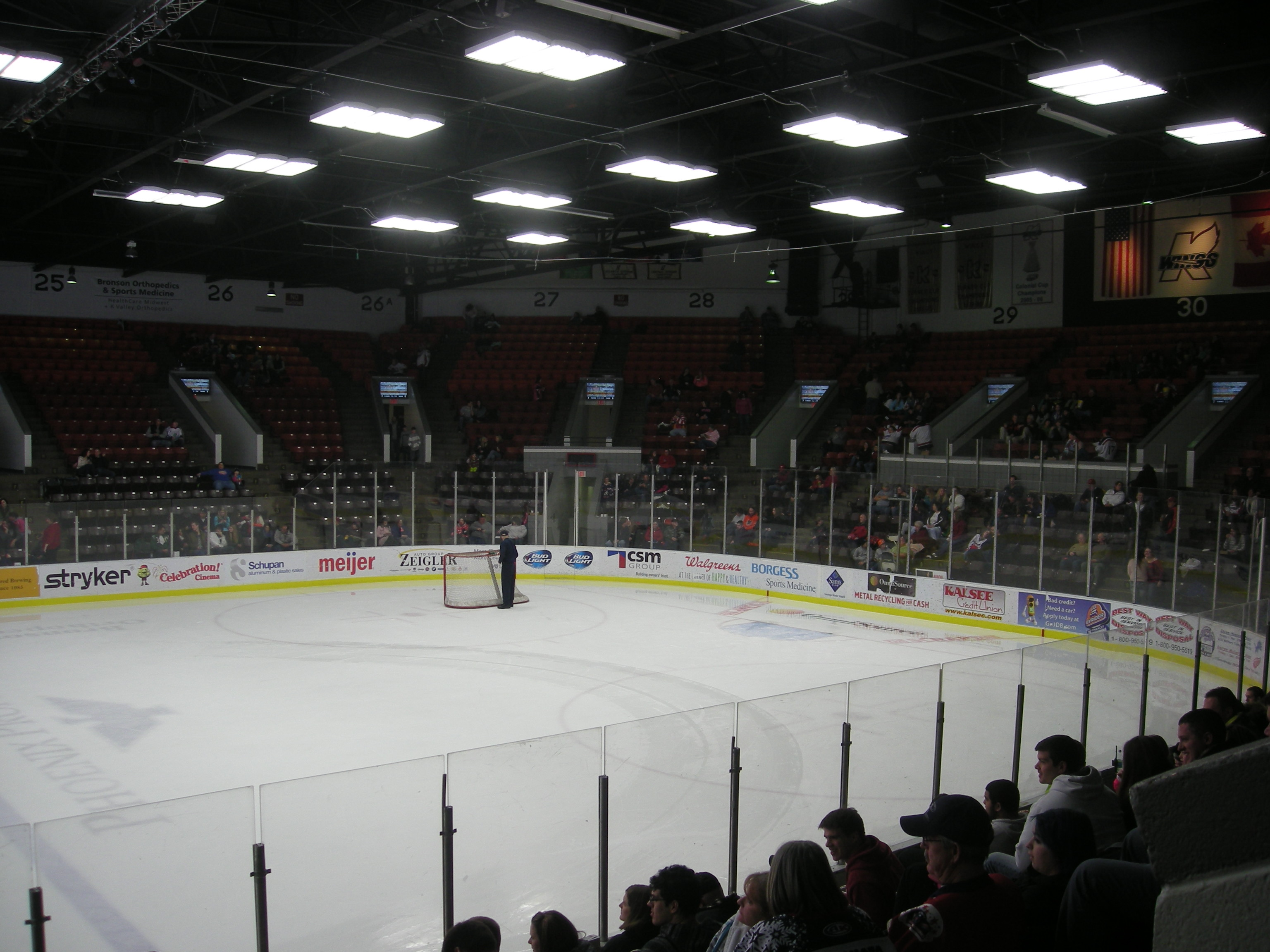
Wings Event Center Arena interior
