= 2010–11 Victoria Salmon Kings season =

2010-11 Victoria Salmon Kings
- League: 16th ECHL
- Division: 4th Mountain
- Conference: 7th Western
- 2010-11 record: 32-36-2-2
- Home record: 15-18-2-1
- Road record: 17-18-0-1
- Goals for: 217
- Goals against: 234

Team information
- General manager: Mark Morrison
- Coach: Mark Morrison
- Assistant coach: Ryan Wade
- Captain: Pete Vandermeer
- Alternate captains: Rob Hennigar; Derick Martin
- Arena: Save-On-Foods Memorial Centre
- Average attendance: 3,717

Team leaders
- Goals: Chad Painchaud (27)
- Assists: Rob Hennigar (54)
- Points: Rob Hennigar (63)
- Penalty minutes: Matt Stefanishion (165)
- Plus/minus: Chad Painchaud (+11)
- Wins: David Shantz (25)
- Goals against average: Riley Gill (1.33)

The 2010–11 Victoria Salmon Kings season is the Salmon Kings' 7th and final season in the ECHL.

== Standings ==
=== Division standings ===
Mountain Division	GP	W	L	OTL	SOL	GF	GA	PTS
Alaska Aces (STL)*	72	47	22	2	1	241	174	97
Idaho Steelheads (DAL)	72	32	27	4	9	225	217	77
Utah Grizzlies (CGY)	72	33	32	4	3	189	227	73
Victoria Salmon Kings (VAN)	72	32	36	2	2	217	234	68

=== Conference standings ===
Western Conference	GP	W	L	OTL	SOL	GF	GA	PTS
Alaska Aces (STL)*	72	47	22	2	1	241	174	97
Bakersfield Condors (MIN)*	72	41	27	2	2	222	210	86
Stockton Thunder (EDM/SJ)	72	37	23	5	7	232	210	86
Las Vegas Wranglers (PHX)	72	38	29	3	2	216	203	81
Idaho Steelheads (DAL)	72	32	27	4	9	225	217	77
Utah Grizzlies (CGY)	72	33	32	4	3	189	227	73
Victoria Salmon Kings (VAN)	72	32	36	2	2	217	234	68
Ontario Reign (LA)	72	27	39	2	4	195	269	60

== Schedule and results ==
=== Regular season ===
2010–11 Game log

October: 5–2–0–0 (Home: 3–0–0–0; Road: 2–2–0–0)
#	Date	Visitor	Score	Home	OT	Decision	Attendance	Record	Pts
1	October 15	Victoria	0–5	Idaho		Shantz	4,055	0–1–0–0	0
2	October 16	Victoria	4–0	Idaho		Gill	3,309	1–1–0–0	2
3	October 22	Victoria	3–2	Las Vegas		Gill	3,856	2–1–0–0	4
4	October 23	Victoria	1–3	Las Vegas		Shantz	3,646	2–2–0–0	4
5	October 27	Ontario	2–5	Victoria		Shantz	4,455	3–2–0–0	6
6	October 29	Ontario	3–6	Victoria		Gill	3,740	4–2–0–0	8
7	October 30	Ontario	1–4	Victoria		Shantz	3,482	5–2–0–0	10

November: 4–9–0–0 (Home: 1–5–0–0; Road: 3–4–0–0)
#	Date	Visitor	Score	Home	OT	Decision	Attendance	Record	Pts
8	November 3	Idaho	2–3	Victoria		Shantz	3,417	6–2–0–0	12
9	November 5	Idaho	5–2	Victoria		Machesney	3,231	6–3–0–0	12
10	November 6	Idaho	5–2	Victoria		Shantz	4,259	6–4–0–0	12
11	November 11	Victoria	2–4	Las Vegas		Shantz	2,828	6–5–0–0	12
12	November 12	Victoria	1–3	Las Vegas		Shantz	3,322	6–6–0–0	12
13	November 13	Victoria	1–3	Las Vegas		Machesney	3,757	6–7–0–0	12
14	November 17	Victoria	1–3	Bakersfield		Machesney	5,051	6–8–0–0	12
15	November 19	Victoria	4–3	Ontario		Machesney	5,657	7–8–0–0	14
16	November 20	Victoria	4–1	Bakersfield		Shantz	5,180	8–8–0–0	16
17	November 21	Victoria	4–1	Stockton		Shantz	6,434	9–8–0–0	18
18	November 24	Idaho	2–1	Victoria		Shantz	3,302	9–9–0–0	18
19	November 26	Idaho	6–4	Victoria		Shantz	2,969	9–10–0–0	18
20	November 27	Idaho	6–3	Victoria		Machesney	3,732	9–11–0–0	18

December: 4–4–1–2 (Home: 1–2–1–1; Road: 3–2–0–1)
#	Date	Visitor	Score	Home	OT	Decision	Attendance	Record	Pts
21	December 1	Stockton	3–2	Victoria	SO	Shantz	3,010	9–11–0–1	19
22	December 3	Stockton	5–3	Victoria		Machesney	4,479	9–12–0–1	19
23	December 4	Stockton	5–4	Victoria	OT	Shantz	3,363	9–12–1–1	20
24	December 8	Victoria	3–1	Alaska		Shantz	3,263	10–12–1–1	22
25	December 9	Victoria	2–3	Alaska	SO	Shantz	4,038	10–12–1–2	23
26	December 15	Victoria	1–4	Idaho		Shantz	3,183	10–13–1–2	23
27	December 17	Victoria	4–3	Idaho	SO	Shantz	4,490	11–13–1–2	25
28	December 18	Victoria	4–3	Utah		Shantz	3,762	12–13–1–2	27
29	December 28	Ontario	6–3	Victoria		Shantz	4,260	12–14–1–2	27
30	December 29	Ontario	4–8	Victoria		Shantz	4,295	13–14–1–2	29
31	December 31	Victoria	0–1	Utah		Shantz	3,244	13–15–1–2	29

January: 5–9–0–0 (Home: 2–6–0–0; Road: 3–3–0–0)
#	Date	Visitor	Score	Home	OT	Decision	Attendance	Record	Pts
32	January 1	Victoria	0–2	Utah		Shantz	3,653	13–16–1–2	29
33	January 5	Stockton	3–2	Victoria		Shantz	3,186	13–17–1–2	29
34	January 7	Stockton	2–4	Victoria		Shantz	3,308	14–17–1–2	31
35	January 8	Stockton	3–1	Victoria		Beckford-Tseu	3,734	14–18–1–2	31
36	January 11	Las Vegas	6–4	Victoria		Shantz	3,146	14–19–1–2	31
37	January 12	Las Vegas	5–3	Victoria		Beckford-Tseu	3,202	14–20–1–2	31
38	January 14	Victoria	6–5	Idaho	OT	Shantz	4,459	15–20–1–2	33
39	January 15	Victoria	1–6	Idaho		Beckford-Tseu	4,134	15–21–1–2	33
40	January 16	Victoria	4–0	Idaho		Shantz	3,086	16–21–1–2	35
41	January 21	Victoria	4–1	Alaska		Shantz	3,939	17–21–1–2	37
42	January 22	Victoria	1–6	Alaska		Beckford-Tseu	4,518	17–22–1–2	37
43	January 28	Las Vegas	4–1	Victoria		Shantz	3,414	17–23–1–2	37
44	January 29	Las Vegas	4–2	Victoria		Shantz	3,382	17–24–1–2	37
45	January 30	Las Vegas	2–4	Victoria		Shantz	3,598	18–24–1–2	39

February: 8–3–0–0 (Home: 4–1–0–0; Road: 4–2–0–0)
#	Date	Visitor	Score	Home	OT	Decision	Attendance	Record	Pts
46	February 2	Alaska	3–6	Victoria		Shantz	3,324	19–24–1–2	41
47	February 4	Alaska	2–6	Victoria		Shantz	4,876	20–24–1–2	43
48	February 5	Alaska	3–1	Victoria		Shantz	3,969	20–25–1–2	43
49	February 11	Victoria	2–0	Las Vegas		Shantz	5,656	21–25–1–2	45
50	February 13	Victoria	4–2	Las Vegas		Shantz	4,644	22–25–1–2	47
51	February 15	Victoria	7–2	Bakersfield		Shantz	2,878	23–25–1–2	49
52	February 18	Victoria	3–1	Stockton		Shantz	7,887	24–25–1–2	51
53	February 19	Victoria	1–8	Stockton		Shantz	7,549	24–26–1–2	51
54	February 20	Victoria	0–4	Stockton		Shantz	5,556	24–27–1–2	51
55	February 25	Utah	2–6	Victoria		Shantz	3,185	25–27–1–2	53
56	February 26	Utah	5–6	Victoria	SO	Beckford-Tseu	3,533	26–27–1–2	55

March: 5–8–1–0 (Home: 3–3–1–0; Road: 2–5–0–0)
#	Date	Visitor	Score	Home	OT	Decision	Attendance	Record	Pts
57	March 2	Bakersfield	0–3	Victoria		Shantz	3,211	27–27–1–2	57
58	March 4	Bakersfield	2–1	Victoria		Shantz	3,248	27–28–1–2	57
59	March 5	Bakersfield	5–2	Victoria		Beckford-Tseu	4,229	27–29–1–2	57
60	March 9	Victoria	3–5	Alaska		Shantz	4,135	27–30–1–2	57
61	March 11	Victoria	1–6	Alaska		Shantz	4,281	27–31–1–2	57
62	March 12	Victoria	1–3	Alaska		Shantz	4,846	27–32–1–2	57
63	March 16	Utah	2–9	Victoria		Shantz	3,565	28–32–1–2	59
64	March 18	Utah	2–5	Victoria		Shantz	3,070	29–32–1–2	61
65	March 19	Utah	3–2	Victoria	OT	Spratt	4,374	29–32–2–2	62
66	March 23	Victoria	1–2	Bakersfield		Shantz	3,729	29–33–2–2	62
67	March 25	Victoria	7–6	Stockton	SO	Spratt	5,830	30–33–2–2	64
68	March 26	Victoria	4–3	Stockton	SO	Shantz	8,923	31–33–2–2	66
69	March 27	Victoria	4–8	Stockton		Spratt	7,974	31–34–2–2	66
70	March 30	Alaska	4–2	Victoria		Shantz	3,727	31–35–2–2	66

April: 1–1–0–0 (Home: 1–1–0–0; Road: 0–0–0–0)
#	Date	Visitor	Score	Home	OT	Decision	Attendance	Record	Pts
71	April 1	Alaska	1–3	Victoria		Spratt	5,411	32–35–2–2	68
72	April 2	Alaska	4–1	Victoria		Spratt	5,143	32–36–2–2	68

Legend: Win (2 points) Loss (0 points) Overtime/shootout loss (1 point)

=== Playoffs ===
2011 Kelly Cup playoffs

Western Conference quarter-final vs. (2) Bakersfield Condors: Victoria won series 3–1
#	Date	Visitor	Score	Home	OT	Decision	Attendance	Series
1	April 4	Bakersfield	1–3	Victoria		Shantz	2,314	1–0
2	April 5	Bakersfield	6–3	Victoria		Shantz	3,274	1–1
3	April 8	Victoria	2–0	Bakersfield		Shantz	5,016	2–1
4	April 9	Victoria	3–2	Bakersfield	OT	Shantz	4,280	3–1

Western Conference semi-final vs. (6) Utah Grizzlies: Victoria won series 4–0
#	Date	Visitor	Score	Home	OT	Decision	Attendance	Series
1	April 15	Victoria	4–2	Utah		Shantz	3,063	1–0
2	April 16	Victoria	4–2	Utah		Shantz	3,673	2–0
3	April 20	Utah	2–3	Victoria	OT	Shantz	3,691	3–0
4	April 22	Utah	1–2	Victoria	2OT	Shantz	6,095	4–0

Western Conference final vs. (1) Alaska Aces: Alaska won series 4–0
#	Date	Visitor	Score	Home	OT	Decision	Attendance	Series
1	April 27	Victoria	1–2	Alaska		Shantz	4,334	0–1
2	April 28	Victoria	3–4	Alaska	OT	Shantz	5,177	0–2
3	April 30	Alaska	6–2	Victoria		Shantz	3,614	0–3
4	May 2	Alaska	3–2	Victoria		Shantz	3,153	0–4

Legend: Win Loss

== Player Stats ==
=== Skaters ===
Note: GP = Games played; G = Goals; A = Assists; Pts = Points; +/- = Plus/minus; PIM = Penalty minutes

Regular season

Player	GP	G	A	Pts	+/-	PIM
Rob Hennigar	61	9	54	63	+5	40
Milan Gajic	59	20	31	51	-5	36
Chad Painchaud	56	27	22	49	+11	37
Matt Siddall	66	21	23	44	-5	164
Rick Cleaver	64	22	14	36	-8	41
Ryan MacMurchy	39	16	17	33	-3	54
Ryan Turek	53	11	22	33	+3	57
Matt Stefanishion	54	10	17	27	-10	165
Kiel McLeod	40	9	16	25	+2	83
PJ Atherton	37	6	18	24	+4	42
Jeff Caister^{†}	46	10	11	21	-1	25
Michael Wilson	62	1	19	20	-7	36
Derek Couture	25	8	11	19	+5	76
Matt Butcher^{†}	37	7	11	18	+1	35
Ryan Dingle	56	8	8	16	-10	45
Tim Kraus^{†‡}	31	4	12	16	-1	27
Josh Aspenlind	39	1	15	16	-2	37
Derick Martin	71	0	12	12	+5	36
Geoff Waugh	57	3	8	11	-11	82
Adam Taylor	23	6	4	10	-2	14
Peter Vandermeer	29	4	6	10	+3	119
Bryan Cameron	7	3	3	6	-1	6
Cam Ritchie	9	2	2	4	-2	7
Garth Murray	8	2	1	3	+1	23
Gord Burnett^{†}	34	1	2	3	+5	87
Taylor Ellington	14	0	3	3	-2	18
Yann Sauve	8	0	2	2	-2	4
Ed Snetsinger^{†}	9	0	2	2	+3	4
Quintin Laing	4	0	1	1	0	0
Chad Klassen	1	0	0	0	0	0
Gabe Gauthier	2	0	0	0	0	4
Adam Ross	2	0	0	0	-1	0
Jeff Terminesi	4	0	0	0	-1	0
Matt Cowie	5	0	0	0	-4	2
Craig Lineker	5	0	0	0	-4	4
Jonathan Milhouse^{‡}	5	0	0	0	0	0
Tommy Maxwell	9	0	0	0	-6	25

Playoffs

Player	GP	G	A	Pts	+/-	PIM
Rob Hennigar	11	0	12	12	+5	6
Chad Klassen	11	3	6	9	+3	2
Jeff Caister	12	4	4	8	+8	4
Chad Painchaud	12	4	4	8	+3	8
Milan Gajic	12	3	4	7	0	8
Kiel McLeod	12	3	3	6	+1	12
Adam Taylor	12	3	2	5	+3	10
Derick Martin	12	2	3	5	+2	8
Ryan Dingle	12	1	4	5	+6	6
Ryan Turek	12	1	4	5	-1	6
Matt Siddall	12	3	0	3	-6	13
Rick Cleaver	8	1	2	3	+4	2
Geoff Waugh	12	0	3	3	+3	10
Derek Couture	4	1	1	2	0	2
Josh Aspenlind	11	1	1	2	+3	4
Tommy Maxwell	11	1	1	2	-2	28
Ryan MacMurchy	3	1	0	1	0	4
Matt Cowie	5	0	1	1	-2	0
Matt Butcher	3	0	0	0	-1	9
Cam Ritchie	5	0	0	0	-1	0

=== Goaltenders ===
Note: GP = Games played; Min = Minutes played; W = Wins; L = Losses; OT = Overtime losses; SOL = Shootout losses; GA = Goals against; GAA= Goals against average; Sv% = Save percentage; SO= Shutouts

Regular season

Player	GP	Min	W	L	OT	SOL	GA	GAA	Sv%	SO
Riley Gill^{‡}	3	180	3	0	0	0	4	1.33	.955	1
David Shantz	54	3130	25	24	1	2	145	2.78	.910	3
Daren Machesney^{‡}	6	307	1	4	0	0	21	4.10	.852	0
Jimmy Spratt^{†}	6	336	2	3	1	0	24	4.28	.860	0
Chris Beckford-Tseu^{‡}	8	383	1	5	0	0	31	4.86	.832	0

Playoffs

Player	GP	Min	W	L	GA	GAA	Sv%	SO
David Shantz	12	746	7	5	30	2.41	.920	1

^{†}Denotes player spent time with another team before joining Victoria. Stats reflect time with the Salmon Kings only.
^{‡}Denotes player no longer with the team. Stats reflect time with Salmon Kings only.

== Professional affiliations ==
=== Vancouver Canucks ===
The Salmon Kings' NHL affiliate based in Vancouver, British Columbia.

=== Manitoba Moose ===
The Salmon Kings' AHL affiliate based in Winnipeg, Manitoba.
