= Peter Ferraro =

American ice hockey player (born 1973)

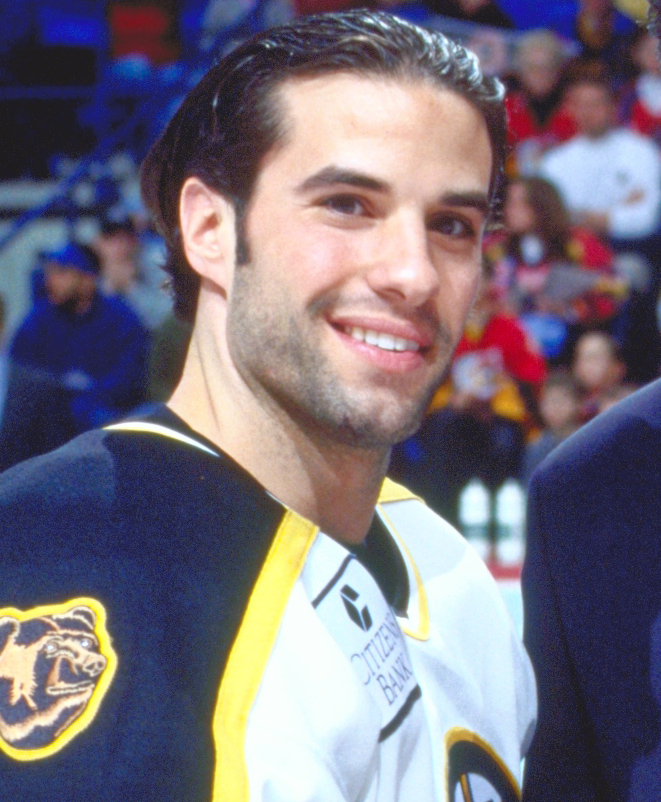
- Ferraro in 2001
- Born: January 24, 1973 (age 53) Port Jefferson, New York, U.S.
- Height: 5 ft 10 in (178 cm)
- Weight: 195 lb (88 kg; 13 st 13 lb)
- Position: Right wing
- Shot: Right
- Played for: New York Rangers; Pittsburgh Penguins; Boston Bruins; Washington Capitals; Södertälje SK; DEG Metro Stars
- National team: United States
- NHL draft: 24th overall, 1992; New York Rangers
- Playing career: 1994–2009

Peter Joseph Ferraro (born January 24, 1973) is an American former professional ice hockey forward who played in the National Hockey League (NHL). He and his twin brother Chris became the second set of identical twins to play on the same NHL team, (the New York Rangers) in the 1995–1996 NHL hockey season. The first was Ron and Rich Sutter.

== Playing career ==
Peter Ferraro was born in Port Jefferson, New York. As a youth, he and his brother Chris played in the 1985, 1986 and 1987 Quebec International Pee-Wee Hockey Tournaments with the Philadelphia Flyers and New York Rangers minor ice hockey teams.

He was the first of the twins to be drafted into the NHL, and was drafted in the first round (#24 overall) in the 1992 NHL entry draft by the New York Rangers.

During his NHL career, he played for the New York Rangers, the Pittsburgh Penguins, Boston Bruins and the Washington Capitals. Despite playing professional hockey for a combined thirty years, neither Ferraro managed to play over 100 NHL games. Peter has a career NHL total of 92 games played while his brother Chris played 74 NHL games.

Both brothers played for the DEG Metro Stars of the DEL in the 2005–06 season. Ferraro has signed a contract with the New York Islanders and attended the team's 2006–07 training camp. As he had previously indicated, he accepted a position with the team's minor league club, the Bridgeport Sound Tigers, as he failed to make the NHL team. On March 27, 2009, the Las Vegas Wranglers announced that Ferraro had been suspended for the remainder of the regular season and playoffs due to Ferraro spearing another player after an on-ice brawl. During that same brawl, his brother Chris had suffered a broken leg, which also ended his season and career. On April 1, 2009 he was released from the Las Vegas Wranglers.

The brothers were inducted into the Suffolk Sports Hall of Fame on Long Island in the Hockey Category with the Class of 2012.

== Personal ==
Ferraro currently runs Ferraro Brothers Elite Hockey with his brother Chris at Newbridge Ice Arena in Bellmore, NY. He was a finalist for the 2012 Portland Pirates Hall Of Fame.

Earlier, he and his brothers built the Twin Rinks facility at Nassau County's Eisenhower Park. But cost overruns led to its bankruptcy in 2015, and the Islanders purchased it to serve as their practice facility.

== Career statistics ==
=== Regular season and playoffs ===
| | | | Regular season | | | | | Playoffs |
| Season | Team | League | GP | G | A | Pts | PIM | GP | G | A | Pts | PIM |
|---|---|---|---|---|---|---|---|---|---|---|---|---|
| 1988–89 | Tabor Academy | HS-MA | — | — | — | — | — | — | — | — | — | — |
| 1989–90 | Tabor Academy | HS-MA | — | — | — | — | — | — | — | — | — | — |
| 1990–91 | Dubuque Fighting Saints | USHL | 29 | 21 | 31 | 52 | 83 | 8 | 7 | 5 | 12 | 10 |
| 1991–92 | Dubuque Fighting Saints | USHL | 21 | 25 | 25 | 50 | 92 | — | — | — | — | — |
| 1991–92 | Waterloo Black Hawks | USHL | 21 | 23 | 28 | 51 | 76 | 4 | 8 | 5 | 13 | 16 |
| 1992–93 | University of Maine | HE | 36 | 18 | 32 | 50 | 106 | — | — | — | — | — |
| 1993–94 | United States National Team | Intl | 60 | 30 | 34 | 64 | 87 | — | — | — | — | — |
| 1993–94 | University of Maine | HE | 4 | 3 | 6 | 9 | 16 | — | — | — | — | — |
| 1994–95 | Atlanta Knights | IHL | 61 | 15 | 24 | 39 | 118 | — | — | — | — | — |
| 1994–95 | Binghamton Rangers | AHL | 12 | 2 | 6 | 8 | 67 | 11 | 4 | 3 | 7 | 51 |
| 1995–96 | New York Rangers | NHL | 5 | 0 | 1 | 1 | 0 | — | — | — | — | — |
| 1995–96 | Binghamton Rangers | AHL | 68 | 48 | 53 | 101 | 157 | 4 | 1 | 6 | 7 | 22 |
| 1996–97 | New York Rangers | NHL | 2 | 0 | 0 | 0 | 0 | 2 | 0 | 0 | 0 | 0 |
| 1996–97 | Binghamton Rangers | AHL | 75 | 38 | 39 | 77 | 171 | 4 | 3 | 1 | 4 | 18 |
| 1997–98 | New York Rangers | NHL | 1 | 0 | 0 | 0 | 2 | — | — | — | — | — |
| 1997–98 | Hartford Wolf Pack | AHL | 36 | 17 | 23 | 40 | 54 | 15 | 8 | 6 | 14 | 59 |
| 1997–98 | Pittsburgh Penguins | NHL | 29 | 3 | 4 | 7 | 12 | — | — | — | — | — |
| 1998–99 | Boston Bruins | NHL | 46 | 6 | 8 | 14 | 44 | — | — | — | — | — |
| 1998–99 | Providence Bruins | AHL | 16 | 15 | 10 | 25 | 14 | 19 | 9 | 12 | 21 | 38 |
| 1999–00 | Boston Bruins | NHL | 5 | 0 | 1 | 1 | 0 | — | — | — | — | — |
| 1999–00 | Providence Bruins | AHL | 48 | 21 | 25 | 46 | 98 | 13 | 5 | 7 | 12 | 14 |
| 2000–01 | Providence Bruins | AHL | 78 | 26 | 45 | 71 | 109 | 17 | 4 | 5 | 9 | 34 |
| 2001–02 | Washington Capitals | NHL | 4 | 0 | 1 | 1 | 0 | — | — | — | — | — |
| 2001–02 | Portland Pirates | AHL | 67 | 21 | 37 | 58 | 119 | — | — | — | — | — |
| 2002–03 | Portland Pirates | AHL | 59 | 22 | 41 | 63 | 123 | 3 | 0 | 2 | 2 | 16 |
| 2003–04 | Springfield Falcons | AHL | 64 | 19 | 31 | 50 | 100 | — | — | — | — | — |
| 2004–05 | Södertälje SK | SEL | 12 | 2 | 1 | 3 | 6 | — | — | — | — | — |
| 2004–05 | Syracuse Crunch | AHL | 48 | 9 | 17 | 26 | 75 | — | — | — | — | — |
| 2005–06 | DEG Metro Stars | DEL | 41 | 13 | 14 | 27 | 98 | 13 | 2 | 4 | 6 | 48 |
| 2006–07 | Bridgeport Sound Tigers | AHL | 37 | 10 | 10 | 20 | 37 | — | — | — | — | — |
| 2006–07 | Peoria Rivermen | AHL | 12 | 3 | 3 | 6 | 6 | — | — | — | — | — |
| 2007–08 | Las Vegas Wranglers | ECHL | 68 | 36 | 37 | 73 | 90 | 20 | 8 | 13 | 21 | 12 |
| 2008–09 | Las Vegas Wranglers | ECHL | 52 | 16 | 14 | 30 | 73 | — | — | — | — | — |
| AHL totals | | | 620 | 251 | 340 | 591 | 1130 | 86 | 34 | 42 | 76 | 252 |
| NHL totals | | | 92 | 9 | 15 | 24 | 58 | 2 | 0 | 0 | 0 | 0 |

=== International ===
Medal record

Representing United States

Ice hockey

World Junior Championships
| Bronze medal – third place | 1992 Germany | |

| Year | Team | Event | Result | GP | G | A | Pts | PIM |
|---|---|---|---|---|---|---|---|---|
| 1992 | United States | WJC | 3rd place, bronze medalist(s) | 7 | 3 | 5 | 8 | 12 |
| 1993 | United States | WJC | 4th | 7 | 7 | 4 | 11 | 8 |
| 1994 | United States | OG | 8th | 8 | 6 | 0 | 6 | 6 |
| 2003 | United States | WC | 13th | 6 | 1 | 4 | 5 | 10 |
| Junior totals | | | | 14 | 10 | 9 | 19 | 20 |
| Senior totals | | | | 14 | 7 | 4 | 11 | 16 |

== Awards and honours ==
| Award | Year |
|---|---|
USHL
| Forward of the Year | 1992 |
| Player of the Year | 1992 |
AHL
| First All-Star Team | 1996 |
| All-Star Game | 1997, 2001, 2003 |
| Calder Cup (Providence Bruins) | 1999 |
| Jack A. Butterfield Trophy | 1999 |
International
| WJC All-Star Team | 1992 |

Awards and achievements
| Preceded by Alexei Kovalev | New York Rangers first-round draft pick 1992 | Succeeded by Niklas Sundström |
