= Jason McBain =

- Born: April 12, 1974 (age 52) Ilion, New York, U.S.
- Height: 6 ft 3 in (191 cm)
- Weight: 220 lb (100 kg; 15 st 10 lb)
- Position: Defense
- Shot: Right
- Played for: Springfield Falcons; Cleveland Lumberjacks; Providence Bruins; Quebec Citadelles; Grand Rapids Griffins; Fresno Falcons; Skelleftea AIK; Las Vegas Wranglers; Hartford Whalers
- National team: United States
- NHL draft: 81st overall, 1992; Hartford Whalers
- Playing career: 1994–2005

Jason Dale McBain (born April 12, 1974) is an American former professional ice hockey defenseman. He was born in Ilion, New York, and grew up in Kimberley, British Columbia. His brother Mike McBain also played professional hockey for the Tampa Bay Lightning.

== Career ==
McBain played for the Lethbridge Hurricanes of the Western Hockey League, until being traded to the Portland Winterhawks one season later, and played three seasons with the Winterhawks.

McBain was drafted 81st overall in the 1992 NHL entry draft by the Hartford Whalers. After McBain was drafted, he started out playing for his first of many minor league teams with the Springfield Falcons. The next season he got called up to the Hartford Whalers roster to start the season, only playing 3 games, and getting sent back down to Springfield. This happened one last time after the Whalers sent him down after only 6 games with the team. From 1997 to 2000, McBain joined many minor league teams, including the Providence Bruins and Quebec Citadelles. After the 2000 season, he left North America to play in the DEL in Germany for the Essen Mosquitoes and Revier Lions. McBain then moved over to Sweden to play for Skelleftea AIK for less than half a season before moving back to North America. He spent the last 2 seasons of his career as captain of the Las Vegas Wranglers, then retiring in 2005.

McBain is currently residing in Kimberley, British Columbia, working as a geotechnical engineer.

== Career statistics ==
			Regular season					Playoffs
Season	Team	League	GP	G	A	Pts	PIM	GP	G	A	Pts	PIM
1989–90	Kimberley Dynamiters	RMJHL	37	20	38	58	77	—	—	—	—	—
1990–91	Lethbridge Hurricanes	WHL	52	2	7	9	39	1	0	0	0	0
1991–92	Lethbridge Hurricanes	WHL	13	0	1	1	12	—	—	—	—	—
1991–92	Portland Winter Hawks	WHL	54	9	23	32	95	6	1	0	1	13
1992–93	Portland Winter Hawks	WHL	71	9	35	44	76	16	2	12	14	14
1993–94	Portland Winter Hawks	WHL	63	15	51	66	86	10	2	7	9	14
1994–95	Springfield Falcons	AHL	77	16	28	44	92	—	—	—	—	—
1995–96	Hartford Whalers	NHL	3	0	0	0	0	—	—	—	—	—
1995–96	Springfield Falcons	AHL	73	11	33	44	43	8	1	1	2	2
1996–97	Hartford Whalers	NHL	6	0	0	0	0	—	—	—	—	—
1996–97	Springfield Falcons	AHL	58	8	26	34	40	16	0	8	8	12
1997–98	Cleveland Lumberjacks	IHL	65	8	22	30	62	3	0	2	2	2
1998–99	Las Vegas Thunder	IHL	65	9	37	46	54	—	—	—	—	—
1998–99	Providence Bruins	AHL	9	1	7	8	10	19	1	8	9	16
1999–00	Quebec Citadelles	AHL	51	8	16	24	29	—	—	—	—	—
1999–00	Grand Rapids Griffins	IHL	16	1	6	7	23	15	2	5	7	12
2000–01	Moskitos Essen	DEL	55	6	10	16	26	—	—	—	—	—
2001–02	Revier Löwen Oberhausen	DEL	59	4	23	27	38	—	—	—	—	—
2001–02	Fresno Falcons	WCHL	7	0	7	7	2	15	2	4	6	6
2002–03	Skelleftea AIK	Allsvenskan	19	3	9	12	20	—	—	—	—	—
2002–03	Fresno Falcons	WCHL	39	8	17	25	24	—	—	—	—	—
2003–04	Las Vegas Wranglers	ECHL	72	11	44	55	80	5	0	2	2	4
2004–05	Las Vegas Wranglers	ECHL	65	8	32	40	57	—	—	—	—	—
NHL totals			9	0	0	0	0	—	—	—	—	—
