= Las Vegas Wranglers =

Defunct minor professional ice hockey team

- City: Las Vegas, Nevada
- League: ECHL
- Conference: Western Conference
- Division: Pacific Division
- Founded: 2003
- Operated: 2003–2014
- Home arena: Orleans Arena (2003–2014)
- Colors: Red, black, white, silver
- Owners: Wranglers Hockey, LLC
- General manager: Mike Madill
- Head coach: Mike Madill
- Affiliates: Calgary Flames (NHL) (2003–2009); Phoenix Coyotes (NHL) (2009–2011) Lowell Lock Monsters (AHL) (2003–2005); Omaha Ak-Sar-Ben Knights (AHL) (2005–2007); Quad City Flames (AHL) (2007–2009); San Antonio Rampage (AHL) (2009–2011); Independent (2011–2014)

Franchise history
- 2003–2014: Las Vegas Wranglers

Championships
- Regular season titles: 2006–07
- Division titles: 2006–07, 2007–08
- Conference titles: 2007–08, 2011–12

The Las Vegas Wranglers were a professional ice hockey team based in Las Vegas Valley. The Wranglers were members of the Pacific Division of the Western Conference of the ECHL (formerly the East Coast Hockey League). The Wranglers were founded as an expansion franchise in 2003 following the ECHL's takeover of the West Coast Hockey League.

In May 2014, the team suspended operations for the 2014–15 ECHL season, allowing it time to secure a new home arena. In 2015, the team withdrew from the ECHL after being unable to find a home arena for the 2015-16 season.

The Wranglers won many accolades over their time in the league. They have the highest winning percentage in ECHL history and hold six other ECHL records. The Wranglers made two appearances in the Kelly Cup Finals, in 2008 and 2012 and won the Brabham Cup once and the Pacific Division title twice. Former Wranglers who have reached the National Hockey League (NHL) include Brent Krahn, Adam Pardy, Dany Sabourin, Tyson Strachan, and Tyler Sloan. From 2003 to 2014, the Wranglers played their home games on the west side of the city at the Orleans Arena. The team's lease with Orleans Arena ended after the 2013–14 season.

The Wranglers had been the ECHL affiliate of the NHL's Calgary Flames since the team's inaugural season in 2003 until 2009 before announcing that they were switching their affiliation to the Phoenix Coyotes for the 2009–10 ECHL season.

The Wranglers garnered many accolades from the local media, including the Las Vegas Review-Journal naming the Wranglers "Best Local Sports Team" three times (2005, 2006, 2009) and head coach Glen Gulutzan "Best Local Coach" (2007, 2009).

== Franchise history ==
=== Return of ice hockey to the desert ===
Original logo that was phased out after ECHL-WCHL merger

With the Las Vegas Thunder of the International Hockey League folding following the 1998–99 IHL season, the West Coast Hockey League (WCHL) announced its intentions to keep ice hockey in the Las Vegas Valley when they granted expansion rights to the city in 1999, with plans for the team to start competing in the 2000–01 WCHL season. The Wranglers team name and logo were announced shortly before what was supposed to be the franchise's inaugural season in 2000, but the team had to suspend its entrance into the WCHL for three seasons due to the lack of a suitable arena for the team to play in. Deciding to not miss out on another season, the Wranglers announced in October 2002 that they planned to play at the proposed Las Vegas Events Center in Downtown Las Vegas and share the arena with the Community College of Southern Nevada's men's and women's basketball teams. The Events Center was to be paid for and operated by a non-profit organization that was supported by Las Vegas mayor Oscar Goodman.

With no progress on the proposed Events Center, the franchise announced in September 2002 that it was moving to the Orleans Arena that was under construction at The Orleans Hotel and Casino. The Orleans Arena became the home of the Wranglers beginning with the 2003–04 WCHL season. Later in September 2002, a planned merger between the WCHL and the East Coast Hockey League was announced that would have the WCHL's six active franchises and three expansion franchises (including the Wranglers) join the ECHL for the 2003–04 season.

=== Early years ===
Alternate logo that was adopted in 2003, but never used

On May 29, 2003, in place of owner Charles Davenport, IV, actor Ricky Schroder introduced former Fresno Falcons player/coach Glen Gulutzan as the franchise's first head coach and general manager. Within four months, Gulutzan came to terms with Calgary Flames general manager Darryl Sutter to make the Wranglers the ECHL affiliate of the Flames and Lowell Lock Monsters. The first two players that Gulutzan signed were brothers and former NHLers Jason and Mike McBain and added veteran ECHL goaltender Marc Magliarditi shortly thereafter. Before the Wranglers inaugural season, Gulutzan named Jason McBain the franchise's first captain. The Wranglers started off their season going 9–1–3 in their first 13 games and they didn't lose a home game in regulation until a 1–0 loss to the San Diego Gulls on December 27, 2003, going 13–1–1 at home over the stretch. The Wranglers finished their first season with a record of 43–22–7 (93 points), second in the Western Conference's Pacific Division (15 points behind Brabham Cup winner San Diego). The Wranglers faced the Idaho Steelheads in the best-of-five Pacific Division Semifinals and despite overtaking Idaho in the first two games, the Steelheads won the remaining three games on their way to their first Kelly Cup championship.

Entering the 2004–05 season, Gulutzan and the Wranglers were expected to compete again for the division crown, but instead the team suffered the worst season in franchise history. Due to the 2004-05 NHL Lockout, local media believed that the team would be stronger as many Calgary Flames players decided to play for the team's affiliate in Lowell, sending multiple top prospects and former NHLers to the team including goaltender Sébastien Centomo. The 2004–05 Wranglers ended up being more remembered for their lack of discipline as forward Adam Huxley set a team record for penalty minutes and Centomo became better known for fighting than stopping the puck. Wranglers fans showed their disdain through chants and signs that called for the dismissal of Gulutzan as head coach. The Wranglers finished the season a disappointing 31–33–8 (70 points) and seventh place in the West Division, failing to capture a playoff spot for the only time in franchise history.

=== Rise to prominence ===
Before the 2005–06 season, Wranglers captain Jason McBain announced his retirement and the team's captaincy was given to his brother Mike as the Wranglers looked to shake off the disappointing performance of their sophomore season. The Wranglers started the season on a rocket pace losing only four games in the first three months of the season. This included the Wranglers besting their home mark to start a season, as they did not lose at home in regulation until January 3, 2006, 3–2 to the Reading Royals. Before the loss to Reading, the Wranglers had gone 12–0–2 during the time. Along with the 14-game unbeaten streak at home to start the season, the Wranglers also tied the league record for most consecutive road wins with ten from November 22, 2005 to December 31, 2005. One of the most memorable moments during the 2005–06 season came during the Wranglers' 5–2 win on November 8 as head coach Glen Gulutzan challenged Fresno's head coach Matt Thomas to a fight because Fresno goons Brad Both and Fraser Clair instigated fights with Wranglers rookies Tim Hambly and Lee Green with 11 seconds left in the game. Several Wranglers set team records during the 2005–06 season, including goaltender Marc Magliarditi for most games played by a goaltender (51) and most wins by a goaltender (34). Centre Matt Dzieduszycki set the team record for most points in a season with 78 and Dan Tudin set team records for highest plus/minus with +38, shots on goal with 256 and shorthanded goals with seven.

The Wranglers ended the season with their best record at 53–13–6 (112 points), only one point behind the Alaska Aces for the West Division title and the Henry Brabham Cup. The 53 wins in 2005–06 were the most in franchise history and the 20-win turnaround led to head coach Glen Gulutzan being awarded the John Brophy Award as the league's top coach. The Wranglers would take on the Idaho Steelheads in the best-of-seven West Division semifinals. The Wranglers found themselves trailing Idaho three games to one, but pulled off what only one other team in the ECHL's history were able to do, winning the best-of-seven series after trailing 3–1. The Wranglers faced the Alaska Aces in the West Division finals, ultimately falling in six games.

Seeking to improve on a great year, the Wranglers were placed in the National Conference's Pacific Division following a league wide realignment. The Wranglers had their best chance to capture their first banner as they did not have to compete with Alaska or Idaho for the division title. The Wranglers had to begin the season without veterans goaltender Marc Magliarditi and Mike McBain but still had a good start, earning points in all of their first eight games, going 3–0–5. The Wranglers relied heavily on new goaltender Mike McKenna and returning stars Shawn Limpright and Marco Peluso for leadership during the time in which the team lost its most veteran players. Magliarditi himself retired in the middle of the season, leaving as the franchise's career leader in minutes played (8517), games played by a goaltender (146), wins (83) and shutouts (7). Despite injuries and being left with only one player from the inaugural 2003–04 franchise, the Wranglers paced themselves to their first ever banner, winning the Pacific Division title on April 4, 2007 with a 4–2 victory on the road against the Long Beach Ice Dogs at Long Beach Arena. Three days later the Wranglers clinched the Brabham Cup title when they defeated the Stockton Thunder 2–1 in the last game of the season, just edging out heated rival, the Alaska Aces by one-point, reminiscent of the Brabham Cup race the two teams had just one year before.

The Wranglers finished the 2006–07 regular season with a 46–12–14 record (106 points) and set the league record for fewest road defeats in a single season with five. Wranglers rookie goalie Mike McKenna would finish second in the race for the Reebok Goaltender of the Year award, finishing behind Adam Berkhoel of the Dayton Bombers, and set single season team records in shutouts (five) and lowest goals against average (2.21). The Wranglers also entered the Kelly Cup playoffs on a 13-game winning streak when they took on the 8th-seeded Phoenix RoadRunners in the National Conference quarterfinals. The Wranglers swept the 'Runners in four games and take on the Idaho Steelheads in the National Conference semifinals. The Wranglers won game one of the series to extend their league record winning streak to 18 games, tying the 1991 Peoria Rivermen of the International Hockey League for the longest winning streak in professional hockey history. The streak ended in game two and Idaho eventually took the series in six games on the way to their second Kelly Cup title in four years.

=== Five years in Las Vegas, the Kelly Cup Finals and after ===
5th anniversary logo, 2007–08

As the Wranglers were set to begin their fifth season in the ECHL many changes had come around the team. After coming out of nowhere to fill in for Wranglers legend Marc Magliarditi, Mike McKenna left Las Vegas, signing with the Portland Pirates of the AHL and Mike McBain was not expected to play much of the season before he retired. In turn, Gulutzan signed rookie goaltenders Daniel Manzato and Kevin Lalande, as well as signing twins and former NHLers Chris and Peter Ferraro. Two games into the season, Mike McBain announced his retirement and Peter Ferraro was named as his replacement as captain. Despite having two untested goaltenders and a team that didn't have a single original Wrangler, the team shot out of a cannon during the early part of the season, going 15–2–0 after two months into the season. By mid-season, the Wranglers were comfortably settled into first place in the Pacific Division and coach Gulutzan was named head coach of the National Conference All-Stars for the third straight year, tying the league record for most appearances at the ECHL All-Star Game by a coach. The Wranglers clinched their second straight Pacific Division crown and National Conference regular season championship on March 26, 2008 with a 3 – 2 overtime victory on the road against the Utah Grizzlies. The win also made the Wranglers the first team in ECHL history to have three consecutive seasons with at least 100 points.

The Wranglers finished the season 46–13–12 (106 points), good enough for first place in the Pacific Division and the number one overall seed in the National Conference playoffs. Right Winger Peter Ferraro would set the team's single season goal mark with 36. The Wranglers would take on the Stockton Thunder in the National Conference quarterfinals in a series that was tighter than expected. Stockton had played the entire season with most of their players being called up to the Springfield Falcons of the AHL or were reassigned by Stockton's parent club, the Edmonton Oilers, and barely limped into the final playoff spot in the National Conference. At the beginning of the series most of the players that had been called up by Springfield or Edmonton were returned to the team with high level experience and pushed the Wranglers to the edge, but Las Vegas was able to recover and take the series in six games. The Wranglers next opponent would be their heated rival, the Alaska Aces in the National Conference semifinals. The Wranglers set the tone for the series, throttling Alaska 8 – 0 in game one of the series. Alaska was unable to recover and the Wranglers would take the series in five games. With only four wins away from the Kelly Cup finals, Las Vegas took on the cinderella 6th-seed Utah Grizzlies. Utah proved tough for Las Vegas, taking the Wranglers to overtime in games two and three, before falling to the Wranglers in a four-game sweep as Las Vegas won its first Bruce Taylor Trophy as the National Conference playoff champions. The Wranglers would meet 2007–08 Brabham Cup champion Cincinnati Cyclones in the Kelly Cup finals. The two teams proved formidable opponents as the split the first four games, before Cincinnati stole momentum defeating the Wranglers in Las Vegas in Game 5 and ultimately taking the Kelly Cup in six games.

Primary logo from 2003–10, Alternate logo from 2010-12

Following their successful 2007–08 campaign, the Wranglers were forced to rebuild again as the team was only able to resign nine players from the previous team. At the beginning of the season, former Wranglers captain and defenceman Mike McBain was named as the team's assistant coach, filling in for former assistant Brent Bilodeau who left the team after three seasons to become head coach of the Wichita Thunder of the Central Hockey League. The 2008–09 team was crippled by injuries and inexperienced players. Despite this and the sudden folding of division rival Fresno, the Wranglers were able to produce a competitive team that finished 34–31–8 (76 points; .521 win %) and mere percentage points behind division champion, Ontario. The Wranglers reached a new level of intensity in their rivalry with the Alaska Aces during the second period of their game on March 25, 2009 in Las Vegas. Alaska's Matt Stefanishion collided with Las Vegas' Chris Ferraro, breaking Ferraro's leg and effectively ending his season and possibly his career. Ferraro's twin brother, Peter became enraged and started a brawl that would involve nine players. During the melee, Peter Ferraro received a game misconduct penalty for spearing, as did Las Vegas' Tim Spencer for kicking. In the aftermath, the Aces were given a five-minute 5-on-3 power play in which they scored three times before the teams were at even strength. A few days after the game, the ECHL suspended Peter Ferraro for the rest of the regular season and the entirety of the 2009 Kelly Cup Playoffs for his actions during the game which included the spearing incident and was released by the team a week later. Wranglers career scoring leader, Shawn Limpright, was named the captain for the rest of the season.

The Wranglers entered the playoffs at the 2nd seed in the Pacific Division and took on the 3rd seed Bakersfield Condors in the best-of-seven Pacific Division semifinals. The Wranglers and Condors traded blows in the first four games, before Bakersfield took a three-games-to-two series lead heading back for Games 6 and 7 in Las Vegas. The Wranglers outscored Bakersfield 8–2 in the last two games to take the series in seven games. The Wranglers headed to the Pacific Division finals to face the division's 4th-seed Stockton Thunder, who were coached by Gulutzan's rival Matt Thomas to an upset of division champion Ontario. As with the previous series with Bakersfield, the first four games were split by the two teams and Las Vegas took a three-games-to-two series lead heading back to Las Vegas. Stockton extended the series to a seventh game by defeating the Wranglers 3–1, but the Wranglers finished off the Thunder in Game 7, 5–1. For the second straight year the Wranglers had reached the National Conference finals, but this time they were to take on the National Conference regular season champion Alaska Aces. Exhausted and injured from two straight seven game series, the Wranglers were unable to retain the Bruce Taylor Trophy, being swept by Alaska in four games.

=== Gulutzan leaves, Mougenel enters ===
Following an unlikely return to the National Conference finals, the first head coach and general manager of the Las Vegas Wranglers, Glen Gulutzan, left the team to become the head coach of the expansion Texas Stars of the AHL. For the first time in seven years, Wranglers owner Charles Davenport was forced to look for a head coach, but stated that Gulutzan's move to the AHL was "long overdue." Gulutzan had been offered assistant coaching jobs in the AHL for the past few years, but the offer to coach Texas was his first head coaching offer in the AHL. Gulutzan said he would make some recommendations to help Davenport's search. On June 25, 2009, former Stockton Thunder assistant coach, Ryan Mougenel was named the second head coach in franchise history.

On July 15, 2009 the Wranglers announced that they had hired former NHL All-Star Keith Primeau to take over as the team's director of player development as well as being a special assistant to the General Manager. Primeau, who played in fifteen NHL seasons, runs the Durham Hockey Institute in Toronto with Wranglers head coach and general manager Ryan Mougenel and Keith's brother Wayne and the trio are also the owners of the Whitby Fury of the Ontario Junior Hockey League.

The 2009–10 season was a roller coaster for the Wranglers. Many veteran players left the team as co-owners Charles Davenport and Jonathan Fleisig cut payrolls in order to save during the recession. Mougenel in turn went with a very youthful team, most of which had little to no professional experience, due to the low budget he was given. The team operated with the league's lowest payroll during the 2009–10 season, spending $10,300 per week compared to the ECHL's weekly salary cap of $11,800.

Near the end of 2009, Davenport sold his ownership rights to Fleisig, who assumed full ownership of the team. The team became more consistent following the All-Star break, going 28–18–7 after starting the season 6–12–1 and moving from last place in the National Conference, to finish in 2nd place in the Pacific Division. Las Vegas would fall to the Utah Grizzlies in the National Conference Quarterfinals in five games, after taking a 2 games to 1 lead, failing to advance past the first round of the playoffs since their inaugural season.

In mid-April 2010, Felisig reached an agreement with an unidentified buyer who planned to keep the team in Las Vegas. ECHL commissioner Brian McKenna confirmed that the team would return for an eighth season in Las Vegas, but couldn't comment further until the transfer of ownership was completed. Mougenel stated that the new owners were "great people" and that "they're real committed to the team." Team president Billy Johnson stated that the team was hoping to make a formal announcement of the transfer by the end of April or the first week of May 2010.

Alternate logo from 2003–10, Primary logo from 2010-12

In mid-June 2010, the ECHL Board of Governors gave unanimous approval for the transfer of ownership from Fleisig to Wranglers Hockey LLC led by Gary Jacobs, a real estate developer from San Diego who is also managing owner of the Lake Elsinore Storm minor league baseball team.

Mougenel announced in late September 2011 that the Wranglers would play as an independent team (i.e., unaffiliated with any NHL/AHL teams) for the 2011–12 ECHL season.

=== Relocation, suspension, and end of the franchise ===
In December 2013, The Orleans Hotel and Casino notified the team that it would not renew their lease for the following season. This prompted the franchise to search for a new venue in the Las Vegas area. The team announced plans to move to a newly built 3,500-seat facility at the Plaza Hotel & Casino in downtown Las Vegas. However, on May 7, 2014, the team announced that they would not move to the Plaza due to the idea of a rooftop arena becoming unfeasible and an alternative, building the arena in the Plaza's parking lot, being too expensive.

As a result, the Wranglers requested and received a voluntary suspension of operations from the ECHL for the 2014–15 season. The team planned to seek a new permanent venue and return to play in the 2015–16 season. On January 30, 2015, it was announced via Facebook that the Wranglers would cease operations after not being able to find a suitable home within a reasonable time frame to submit to the board of governors of the ECHL. In 2016, Las Vegas was awarded a National Hockey League franchise in the Vegas Golden Knights.

=== Notable promotions ===
The Wranglers are the only team to hold a game that was played at midnight. The annual "Midnight Roundup" was created so that Las Vegas residents who work during the usual game times (e.g. employees of the gaming industry), could watch a game. Other Wranglers promotions included the traditional mullet hat night and even a give away of orange vests that said "Don't Shoot...I'm Human!" during a game on March 17, 2006, a joke on the Dick Cheney hunting incident. In January 2009, the team held the "Rod Blagojevich Prison Uniform Night" parodying the impeachment of the then-Governor of Illinois, where both teams wore inmate-like attire - the Wranglers striped jerseys, the visiting Bakersfield Condors orange jerseys resembling the current Department of Corrections issue - and the referees blue jerseys resembling prison guards. Their 2011/12 home opener was a promotion for "Rapture Day", as this game coincided with the Rapture prediction of Oakland radio host Harold Camping, and on New Years Day, to parody how the 2012 NHL lockout forced the NHL Winter Classic to be cancelled that year, the Wranglers held an "Indoor Winter Classic", that even gave a trophy with a chain and a padlock.

== Team colors and mascot ==
=== Logo ===
The Wranglers' first logo featured a cowboy riding a bull and holding a hockey stick with Las Vegas Wranglers script below the bull. The cowboy and bull are both black and white and are outlined in silver. The script consists of "Las Vegas" in silver cursive, while "Wranglers" is in white with silver accents. Prior to the WCHL-ECHL merger, the Wranglers logo was an outline of a cowboy's face streaking to the left with a black cowboy hat and red and yellow outlines. A script underneath the logo featured "Las Vegas" in black above "Wranglers" in yellow with a red outline.

On July 5, 2012, the Wranglers unveiled their new identity package; the primary logo featured a cowboy's head inside a shield with a goalie mask over his face. The cowboy hat is black and gray, with the mask white and gray and the shield in two shades of red and outlined in black. Beneath the cowboy is a red eight-pointed star, and on either side of him is a white "LV" and "NV," representing the city and state's abbreviation.

=== Jerseys ===
The Wranglers' final colors were black, red, white and silver and could be seen on both the home and road jerseys, which were adopted prior to the 2007–08 season. The black and white jerseys feature a crest with a poker chip logo on the front. The outer circle of the crest reads "Las Vegas Wranglers", while the middle of the crest leaves room for the player's individual jersey number and the sleeves sport the poker chip hockey puck logo. The team has two alternate jerseys which have been used since the team's inaugural season in 2003. The red alternate jersey, which had been the team's road jersey from 2003–07, has black shoulders and three black stripes, one across each arm and one across the waist and a crest on the front of the jersey that includes "Las Vegas" in white cursive over a poker chip/hockey puck logo. The second alternate is black with red shoulders and five red stripes, one across each elbow, one across each arm and one across the waist. The jersey also features red die along the bottom of the jersey and between the red stripes on each arm. The jersey's crest includes script that says "VEGAS" with each letter in an individual circle in front of a red hockey stick with the poker chip/hockey puck logo on the blade of the stick.

The Wranglers' previous home jersey, which was used from 2003–07, was white with a previously unreleased Wranglers logo on the chest and is trimmed with black and red on the sleeves and waist.

As of the second half of the 2009–2010 season, the Las Vegas Wranglers again started wearing the Red Alternate and Black Alternate Jerseys at home.

In December 2010, the team wore a Christmas-themed Santa Jersey which was featured as the number 22 worst jersey in an article in the Vancouver Sun. The team also held Rod Blagojevich Night where the Wranglers wore a striped prison-themed jersey with their opponents, the Bakersfield Condors, wearing an orange jumpsuit and referees wearing a blue police guard uniform.

=== Mascot ===
The Wranglers' mascot was "The Duke", a 7-foot-3-inch (2.21 m) green bull that was based on the Philly Phanatic and was the team's mascot since its inaugural season in 2003. The Duke kept the crowd excited, signed autographs, and participated in entertainment during intermissions and player introductions at the beginning of the game. The Duke is also a regular at other events around the city including races at the Las Vegas Motor Speedway and making appearances with players at local elementary schools. The Duke has attended three ECHL All-Star Games as the league's favorite mascot.

== Team information ==
=== Main rivals ===
==== Alaska Aces ====
Possibly the Wranglers' strongest rivalry was with the Alaska Aces. The Aces and Wranglers were the two winningest franchises in ECHL history and the two had combined for six division titles, two Brabham Cups and three Kelly Cup Finals appearances. The Alaska Aces rivalry began during the 2005–06 season in which the Wranglers fell one point behind the Aces for the West Division and Brabham Cup titles. The Aces would also eliminate the Wranglers in six games in the 2006 West Division Finals on way to their first Kelly Cup. The Wranglers would return the favor in 2008 National Conference Semifinals by defeating the Aces in five games on way to their appearance in the Kelly Cup Finals. The Aces and Wranglers met for the third time in the playoffs in the 2009 National Conference Finals, with the Aces sweeping the Wranglers in four games.

The Aces-Wranglers rivalry quickly become one of the biggest for both teams and for the league itself. Three games were usually played in four days (usually Wednesday, Friday and Saturday), allowing for many Aces fans to come to Las Vegas for a hockey weekend. The rivalry has known to become quite violent as the case of a game in March 2009. During the second period of Aces-Wranglers game on March 25, 2009, in Las Vegas, when Alaska's Matt Stefanishion collided with Las Vegas' Chris Ferraro, breaking Ferraro's leg and effectively ending his season and career. Ferraro's twin brother, Peter became enraged and started a brawl that would involve nine players. During the melee, Peter Ferraro received a game misconduct penalty for spearing, as did Las Vegas' Tim Spencer for kicking. In the aftermath, the Aces were given a five-minute 5-on-3 power play in which they scored three times before the teams were at even strength. A few days after the game, the ECHL suspended Peter Ferraro for the rest of the regular season and the entirety of the 2009 Kelly Cup Playoffs for his actions during the game which included the spearing incident.

The Aces-Wranglers rivalry continued early in the 2009–10 season. During a three-game series in the second week of the season, Alaska and Las Vegas totaled 93 penalties for 296 penalty minutes, including seven game misconducts. In the final game of the series, an Alaska player plowed through Wranglers goaltender Michael Ouzas on three separate occasions, sparking a multiple skirmishes after each incident.

==== Other rivals ====
The Las Vegas Wranglers had many other significant rivalries which include those with the Bakersfield Condors, Fresno Falcons, Idaho Steelheads, Long Beach Ice Dogs, Ontario Reign, Phoenix RoadRunners, San Diego Gulls, Stockton Thunder, Toledo Storm. and Utah Grizzlies.

The rivalries with the Condors and the Thunder started off very softly during the Wranglers inaugural season but have become more heated since the Wranglers' move into the Pacific Division during the 2006–07 season.

The rivalry with Fresno came from the two teams' normal battling for position near the top of the division standings.

The Wranglers and the Steelheads had a constant rivalry that has centered around the playoffs. The Wranglers had met the Steelheads in all three of their playoff appearances.

The Texas Wildcatters relocated to Ontario, California, and became the Ontario Reign. The Reign, affiliated with the Los Angeles Kings, who had a significant fan base in Las Vegas, is often considered a part of the Los Angeles sports market. In 2009, Ontario became the first team other than the Wranglers to win the Pacific Division title since Las Vegas returned to the division in 2006.

The longest of the rivalries was with the Utah Grizzlies, which started between the Las Vegas Thunder and the Utah Grizzlies in the International Hockey League and came to its highest point during 1996 IHL Western Conference Finals. The rivalry with Long Beach, Phoenix and San Diego also came when the cities had members in the IHL and made numerous playoff appearances against each other.

=== Theme songs ===
The Wranglers had numerous songs that represent the team during pre-game introductions. Songs that represented the regular season have included: Never Gonna Stop (The Red Red Kroovy), Stand Up, Ready Steady Go, ...To Be Loved, Crash. When the team makes the playoffs, the song that was used in the regular season is usually changed. Songs that have represented the playoffs have included: The Hand That Feeds and Lights and Sounds. During the regular season the Wranglers used Ain't Nothing Wrong With That by Robert Randolph and the Family Band and The Pretender by the Foo Fighters as their theme song. For the 2008 Kelly Cup Playoffs, the Wranglers used Give It All by Rise Against. The Wranglers last used Redlight King "Born to Rise" before folding.

== Season-by-season record ==
Note: GP = Games played, W = Wins, L = Losses, OTL = Overtime losses, SOL=Shootout losses, Pts = Points, GF = Goals for, GA = Goals against

Regular Season										Playoffs				
Season	GP	W	L	OTL	SOL	Pts	GF	GA	Standing	Year	1st round	2nd round	3rd round	Kelly Cup
2003–04	72	43	22	0	7	93	227	186	2nd of 7, Pacific	2004	L, 2–3, IDH	—	—	—
2004–05	72	31	33	3	5	70	201	199	7th of 8, West	2005	did not qualify			
2005–06	72	53	13	4	2	112	267	176	2nd of 6, West	2006	W, 4–0, IDH	L, 3–4, AK	—	—
2006–07	72	46	12	6	8	106	231	187	1st of 5, Pacific	2007	W, 4–0, PHX	L, 2–4, IDH	—	—
2007–08	72	47	13	5	7	106	244	179	1st of 4, Pacific	2008	W, 4–2, STK	W, 4–1, AK	W, 4–0, UTA	L, 2-4, CIN
2008–09	73	34	31	2	6	76	208	195	2nd of 5, Pacific	2009	W, 4–3, BAK	W, 4–3, STK	L, 0–4, AK	—
2009–10	72	34	30	4	4	76	234	257	2nd of 4, Pacific	2010	L, 2–3, UTA	—	—	—
2010–11	72	38	29	3	2	81	216	203	3rd of 4, Pacific	2011	L, 2–3, IDH	—	—	—
2011–12	72	42	22	1	7	92	235	198	2nd of 4, Pacific	2012	W, 3–0, UTA	W, 4–1, IDH	W, 4–1, AK	L, 1–4, FLA
2012–13	72	37	30	2	3	79	196	192	3rd of 5, Pacific	2013	L, 3–4, STK	—	—	—
2013–14	72	20	44	4	4	48	174	248	4th of 4, Pacific	2014	L, 0–4, AK	—	—	—

== Franchise records ==
=== Scoring leaders ===
These are the top-ten point-scorers in franchise history. Figures are updated after each completed ECHL regular season.

Note: Pos = Position; GP = Games played; G = Goals; A = Assists; Pts = Points; P/G = Points per game

Player	Pos	GP	G	A	Pts	P/G
Adam Miller	C	206	81	141	222	1.08
Tyler Mosienko	C	228	73	133	206	.90
Shawn Limpright	LW	241	48	123	171	.71
Chris Neiszner	C	244	62	72	134	.54
Mike Madill	D	336	24	107	131	.39
Chris Francis	C	223	50	80	130	.58
Dan Tudin	LW	130	54	65	119	.91
Eric Lampe	F	109	63	53	116	1.06
Derek Edwardson	C	122	43	70	113	.92
Steven Crampton	LW	123	43	68	111	.90

=== Top performances ===
- First team in ECHL history to have three consecutive 100-point seasons.
- Highest winning percentage (.676; 2003–08) in ECHL history
- Highest road winning percentage (.706; 2003–08) in ECHL history
- Fewest (5; 2006–07) and 3rd (7; 2007–08) fewest road losses in one season
- Tied for longest road win streak in ECHL history (10 – 22'Nov'05 – 31'Dec'05)
- Hold longest win streak in ECHL history (18 games)
- Tied with 1990–91 Peoria Rivermen of the IHL for longest win streak in professional hockey history (18 games).
- Fewest shorthanded goals allowed, one season (2; 2007–08)
- Fewest penalty minutes in one game (0; 27'Nov'04 @ Florida)
- 2nd most road wins in one season (25; 2005–06)
- 3rd most wins in one season (53; 2005–06)
- 3rd (12; 2006–07) fewest losses in one season
- 3rd and 4th longest regular season win streaks in ECHL history
- 3rd longest unbeaten streak (20 – 03'Nov'07 – 21'Dec'07) (1)
- 4th most ties in one season (14; 2006–07)
- 5th most points in one season (112; 2005–06)
- 5th highest winning percentage for one season (.778; 2005–06)

== Notable players ==
Many former Wranglers have either played in the National Hockey League before or after their careers as Wranglers. These include Adam Cracknell (2006–08), Brent Krahn (2003–04), Chris Ferraro (2007–09), Peter Ferraro (2007–09), Adam Pardy (2005–06), Dany Sabourin (2003–04), Tyler Sloan (2005–06), Billy Tibbetts (2004–05) and Deryk Engelland (2003–05), with Engelland later playing for Las Vegas's NHL franchise. Former Wranglers that would finish their careers with the Wranglers include Marc "Mags" Magliarditi (2003–07), Jason McBain (2003–05), and Mike McBain (2003–08).

== Leaders ==
=== Team captains ===
- Jason McBain, 2003–05
- Mike McBain, 2005–07
- Peter Ferraro, 2007–09
- Shawn Limpright, 2009
- Chris Neiszner, 2009–10
- Kevin Schaeffer, 2010–11
- Craig Switzer, 2010–11
- Mike Madill, 2011–13

=== Head coaches ===
- Glen Gulutzan, 2003–09
- Ryan Mougenel, 2009–2013
- Mike Madill, 2013–2014

== Awards and honors ==
Henry Brabham Cup
ECHL regular season champion

- 2006–07

Bruce Taylor Trophy
National Conference playoff champion

- 2007–08, 2011–12

Pacific Division titles

- 2006–07, 2007–08

John Brophy Award
ECHL Coach of the year

- Glen Gulutzan: 2005–06

All-ECHL Second Team

- Adam Miller : 2009–10

Excellence in Media Relations

- Josh Fisher: 2006–07

Ticket Department of the Year

- 2005–06

Ticket Executive of the Year

- Danielle Lucero: 2005–06

== See also ==
- Vegas Golden Knights — National Hockey League team that began play in the 2017–18 season.
