= Adam Pardy =

Canadian ice hockey player (born 1984)

- Born: March 29, 1984 (age 42) Bonavista, Newfoundland, Canada
- Height: 6 ft 4 in (193 cm)
- Weight: 227 lb (103 kg; 16 st 3 lb)
- Position: Defence
- Shot: Left
- Played for: Calgary Flames; Dallas Stars; Buffalo Sabres; Winnipeg Jets; Edmonton Oilers; Nashville Predators; Frölunda HC; Newfoundland Growlers
- NHL draft: 173rd overall, 2004; Calgary Flames
- Playing career: 2005–2019

Adam Pardy (born March 29, 1984) is a Canadian former professional ice hockey player. He was a defenceman in the National Hockey League (NHL) for the Calgary Flames, Dallas Stars, Buffalo Sabres, Winnipeg Jets, Edmonton Oilers, Nashville Predators. He also played in the Swedish Hockey League for Frölunda HC. He was selected by the Calgary Flames in the sixth round, 173rd overall, at the 2004 NHL entry draft.

== Playing career ==
=== Junior ===
Pardy was selected by the Halifax Mooseheads of the Quebec Major Junior Hockey League (QMJHL) in 2002, but was unable to earn a spot on Halifax's deep roster. As a result, he began the 2002–03 season in the Maritime Junior A Hockey League playing first for the Yarmouth Mariners and then the Antigonish Bulldogs. His QMJHL rights were traded to the Cape Breton Screaming Eagles in January 2003, but the Bulldogs refused to release him at first as they wished to keep him for their own playoff run. He was finally given his release to play with the Screaming Eagles late in the season and appeared in seven regular season games in the Quebec League and two more in the playoffs.

He then played two full seasons with the Screaming Eagles. Pardy played 68 games for Cape Breton in 2003–04, scoring four goals and 12 points, adding 137 penalty minutes. Following the season, the Calgary Flames selected him as their sixth round selection, 173rd overall, at the 2004 NHL entry draft. His selection at the age of 20 was unusual, as it came two years after most players are drafted and was his third time through the draft after being passed over in 2002 and 2003. He improved to 12 goals, 27 assists and 163 penalty minutes in 2004–05 as an over-age player. Pardy played a total of 144 games for the Screaming Eagles, recording 16 goals, 40 assists and 302 penalty minutes.

=== Professional ===
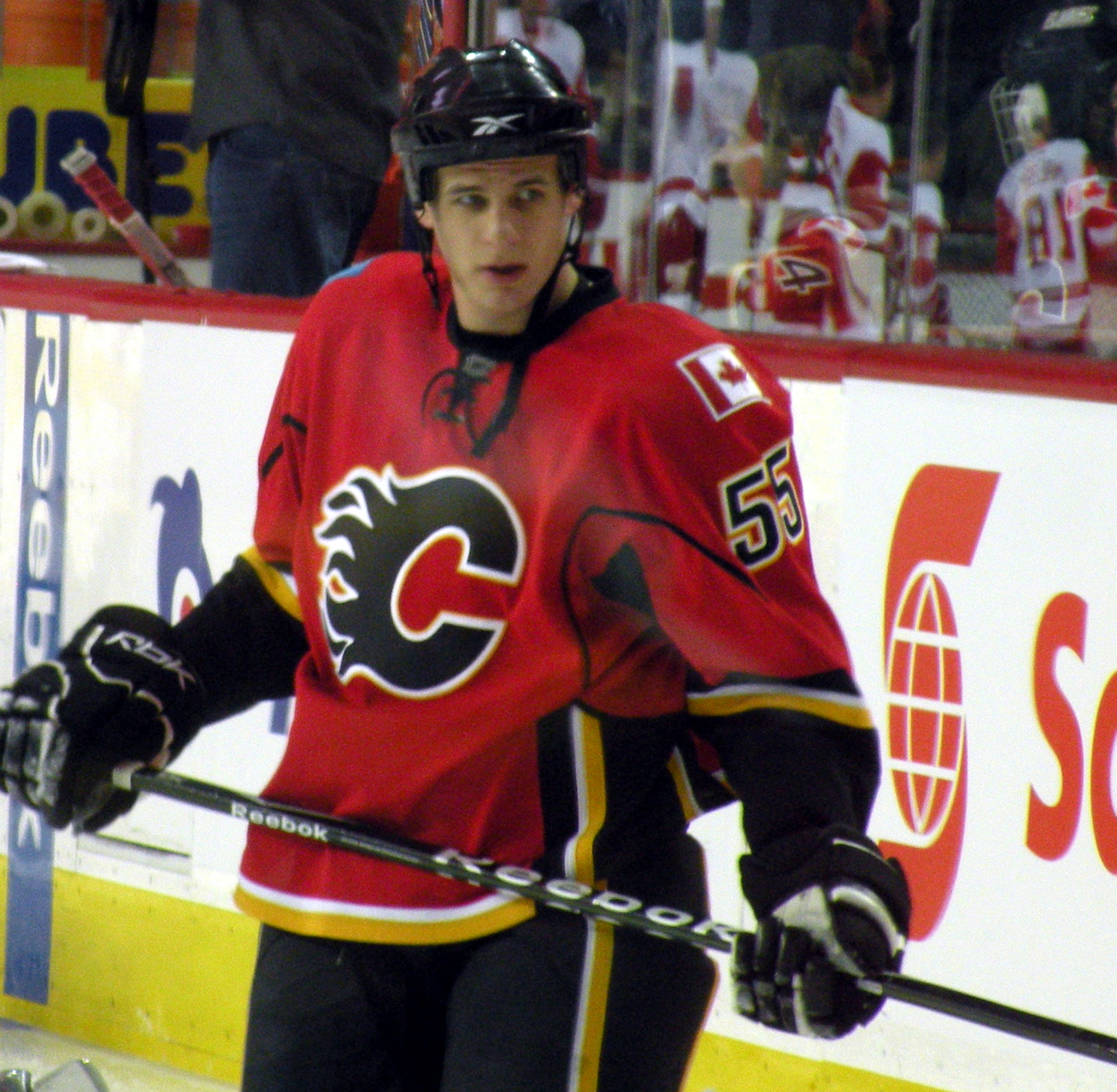
Pardy with the Calgary Flames

Pardy turned professional in 2005 and began the season with Calgary's American Hockey League (AHL) affiliate, the Omaha Ak-Sar-Ben Knights. He struggled at first; he failed to score and was a minus player in his first 24 games, resulting in a demotion to the ECHL's Las Vegas Wranglers. He found greater success in Las Vegas, scoring his first professional goal and adding 11 assists in 41 games. He appeared in 70 games with Omaha in his first full AHL season in 2006–07, scoring two goals and six assists. Pardy did not earn much ice time initially as the coaches played him sparingly for the first three months of the season. As his play improved, he earned greater responsibilities with the Knights.

Entering his third season of professional hockey in 2007–08, Pardy continued to impress the Flames organization with his development, and while he did not make the team out of training camp, he was one of the final cuts. He joined the Quad City Flames for the season, and was briefly recalled to Calgary in December 2007 as an injury replacement, but did not appear in any games with the Flames. He finished the season in Quad City, scoring five goals and 18 points in 65 games, and played in the 2008 AHL All-Star Game.

Hoping to build on that season, Pardy entered 2008–09 training camp looking to earn a spot with the Flames. He signed a new, one-year contract, and made the team out of camp. Pardy made his NHL debut in the team's season opener on October 9, 2008. He played just under eight minutes in a 6–0 loss to the Vancouver Canucks. In doing so, he became the first former Las Vegas Wranglers skater to play an NHL game. Pardy was used sparingly early in the season, but gained a full-time spot in the lineup in November when Jim Vandermeer suffered a broken ankle.

He scored his first NHL point, an assist, in a 3–2 shootout loss to the Florida Panthers on December 12, 2008. Against the New York Islanders on January 8, 2009, he scored his first career goal. Pardy finished his rookie season with 60 games played, one goal and nine assists. He also appeared in six playoff games. Because of his age and low number of NHL games played, he was an unrestricted free agent following the season. The Flames made re-signing him a priority, agreeing to a two-year, US$1.4 million contract that was worth less than he might have received on the open market.

Despite a slow start at training camp, Pardy retained his position as the team's sixth defenceman entering the 2009–10 season. He missed three games early in the season with a sprained wrist, and was left as the seventh defenceman late in the year after the Flames acquired Steve Staios. He finished his second NHL season with two goals and seven assists in 57 games. Pardy suffered a separated shoulder in the second game of the 2010–11 season, an injury that caused him to miss the first two months of the season. He also missed the last two months of the season with an upper body injury.

An unrestricted free agent, Pardy left the Flames after the 2010–11 season and signed a two-year, $4 million contract with the Dallas Stars. He began the season on injured reserve after suffering a rib injury in the pre-season, and spent much of the season out of the Stars' lineup. He finished the 2011–12 season with three assists in 36 games played.

Pardy played only one season in Dallas, as he was included in a July 2, 2012 trade that also sent Steve Ott to the Buffalo Sabres in exchange for Derek Roy. Pardy split the lockout-shortened season between Buffalo and the AHL's Rochester Americans. He had two goals and seven assists in 21 AHL games, and added four assists in 17 games in Buffalo. As a free agent, Pardy joined his fourth team in four seasons, signing a one-year, $600,000 contract with the Winnipeg Jets for the 2013–14 season. One of his most notable games that season was against the Chicago Blackhawks on November 6, 2013, when Pardy went through the glass after a bodycheck from Brandon Bollig. A fan ripped off Pardy's helmet and put it on his head, while his female companion appeared to dump beer on Pardy. Pardy would go on to sign a one-year, $1,000,000 extension for the Jets, on July 1, 2015.

During the 2015–16 season, having played sparingly in 14 games with the Jets, Pardy was placed on waivers and claimed by the Edmonton Oilers on February 29, 2016. Pardy appeared in 9 further games with the Oilers for 3 assists.

As a free agent in the off-season, Pardy was unable to attain an NHL contract. On September 8, 2016, Pardy agreed to attend the Florida Panthers training camp on a professional try-out contract. Following his release from his professional tryout, Pardy signed with the Springfield Thunderbirds, the AHL affiliate of the Panthers. Prior to the beginning the 2016–17 season, Pardy was traded by the Thunderbirds to the Milwaukee Admirals for three minor-leaguers on October 24, 2016. On December 1, 2016, Pardy returned to the NHL as he was signed to a one-year contract with the Admirals NHL affiliate, the Nashville Predators.

Pardy as a free agent belatedly spent the remainder of the 2017–18 season abroad, playing with Swedish club Frölunda HC of the Swedish Hockey League (SHL), appearing in just 11 games for 1 assist. Returning to North America in the following off-season, Pardy signed for the inaugural season of hometown club, the Newfoundland Growlers in the ECHL on September 7, 2018. The Growlers went on to win the Kelly Cup and Pardy announced his retirement at the conclusion of the season.

== Playing style ==
Pardy is not an offensive defenceman, instead focusing his play on preventing his opposition from scoring. His defensive partner, Cory Sarich, praised his calm demeanor heading into the 2009–10 season. He also plays a physical game, recording 77 hits in 60 games as a rookie, including a check on Jared Boll that was described as one of the best of the 2008–09 season.

== Personal life ==
Pardy grew up in Bonavista, Newfoundland, a town of about 3,190 people. He comes from a tight-knit family; his parents, Stan and Lorraine, and elder brothers, Neil and Todd, made sacrifices and committed the little money they had towards Pardy's hockey career. His family followed him to Alberta but have since returned home. Pardy's father used to work in construction in Lloydminster, and his brothers are electricians in Calgary. The family now rents out small houses to tourists visiting Bonavista.

In addition to ice hockey, Pardy played ball hockey while a junior. He was named the most valuable defenceman at the 2003 junior nationals by the Canadian Ball Hockey Association. He won a bronze medal with the Canadian team at the 2004 World Ball Hockey Championships in Slovakia.

Pardy was a spokesman for Big Brothers Big Sisters of Calgary.

== Career statistics ==
			Regular season					Playoffs
Season	Team	League	GP	G	A	Pts	PIM	GP	G	A	Pts	PIM
2001–02	Central Newfoundland AAA	Midget
2002–03	Yarmouth Mariners	MHL	1	0	0	0	2	—	—	—	—	—
2002–03	Antigonish Bulldogs	MHL	31	5	16	21	42	—	—	—	—	—
2002–03	Cape Breton Screaming Eagles	QMJHL	7	0	1	1	2	2	0	0	0	0
2003–04	Cape Breton Screaming Eagles	QMJHL	68	4	12	16	137	5	0	1	1	8
2004–05	Cape Breton Screaming Eagles	QMJHL	69	12	27	39	163	5	2	2	4	8
2005–06	Omaha Ak–Sar–Ben Knights	AHL	24	0	0	0	18	—	—	—	—	—
2005–06	Las Vegas Wranglers	ECHL	41	1	11	12	55	10	2	1	3	12
2006–07	Omaha Ak–Sar–Ben Knights	AHL	70	2	6	8	60	6	1	1	2	0
2007–08	Quad City Flames	AHL	65	5	13	18	67	—	—	—	—	—
2008–09	Calgary Flames	NHL	60	1	9	10	69	6	0	2	2	5
2009–10	Calgary Flames	NHL	57	2	7	9	48	—	—	—	—	—
2010–11	Calgary Flames	NHL	30	1	6	7	24	—	—	—	—	—
2011–12	Texas Stars	AHL	2	0	4	4	2	—	—	—	—	—
2011–12	Dallas Stars	NHL	36	0	3	3	16	—	—	—	—	—
2012–13	Rochester Americans	AHL	21	2	7	9	22	—	—	—	—	—
2012–13	Buffalo Sabres	NHL	17	0	4	4	14	—	—	—	—	—
2013–14	St. John's IceCaps	AHL	3	0	0	0	9	—	—	—	—	—
2013–14	Winnipeg Jets	NHL	60	0	6	6	38	—	—	—	—	—
2014–15	Winnipeg Jets	NHL	55	0	9	9	40	2	1	0	1	2
2015–16	Winnipeg Jets	NHL	14	0	1	1	8	—	—	—	—	—
2015–16	Edmonton Oilers	NHL	9	0	3	3	6	—	—	—	—	—
2016–17	Milwaukee Admirals	AHL	31	3	4	7	20	3	0	0	0	6
2016–17	Nashville Predators	NHL	4	0	0	0	6	—	—	—	—	—
2017–18	Frölunda HC	SHL	11	0	1	1	18	—	—	—	—	—
2018–19	Newfoundland Growlers	ECHL	41	6	15	21	44	22	0	4	4	32
AHL totals			214	12	34	46	198	9	1	1	2	6
NHL totals			342	4	48	52	269	8	1	2	3	7

== Awards and honours ==
Award	Year
AHL
All-Star Game	2008
ECHL
Kelly Cup (Newfoundland Growlers)	2019
