= Mike McBain =

Canadian ice hockey player

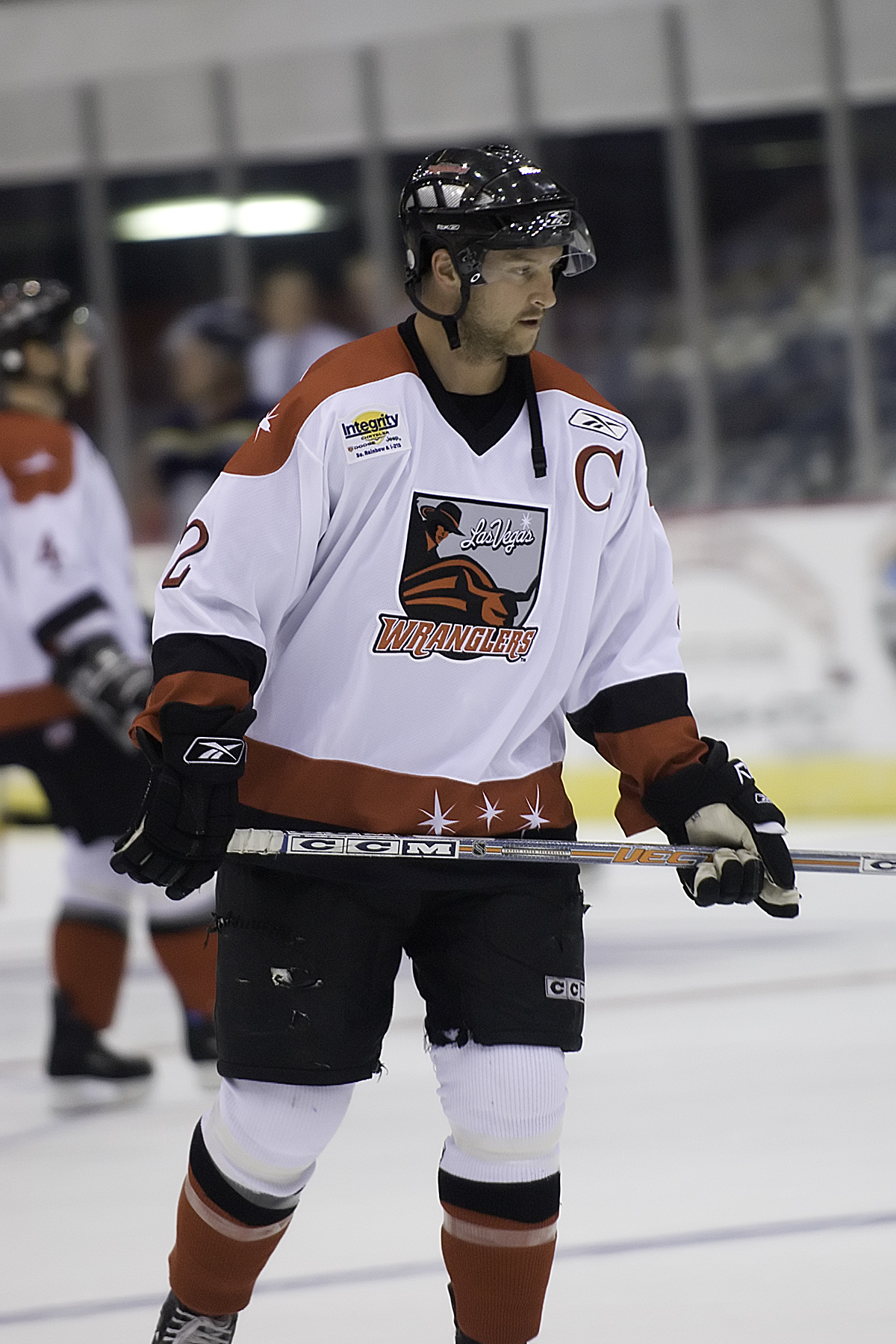
- Born: January 12, 1977 (age 49) Kimberley, British Columbia, Canada
- Height: 6 ft 2 in (188 cm)
- Weight: 210 lb (95 kg; 15 st 0 lb)
- Position: Defense
- Shot: Left
- Played for: Tampa Bay Lightning; Bracknell Bees
- NHL draft: 30th overall, 1995; Tampa Bay Lightning
- Playing career: 1997–2008

Michael Brian McBain (born January 12, 1977) is a Canadian former professional ice hockey player and convicted sex offender.

== Early life and family ==
Born in Kimberley, British Columbia to Dale and Eileen McBain, he is also the brother of Jason McBain who played professional hockey for the Hartford Whalers.

== Playing career ==
McBain spent 64 games in the National Hockey League with the Tampa Bay Lightning between 1997 and 1999, scoring seven points. After spending four years between the IHL and AHL, McBain eventually left North America to play in England with the Bracknell Bees. After spending two seasons with the Bees, McBain returned to North America to play with the Las Vegas Wranglers. McBain played with the Wranglers from 2003 to 2008 and was team captain from 2005-07.

After five seasons with the Wranglers, McBain retired in 2008 and became an assistant coach with the team.

== Sexual assault conviction ==
In August 2012, McBain was formally charged in Clark County, Nevada with nine counts of sexual assault against his 16-year-old stepdaughter. According to police reports, the girl claimed it began with inappropriate touching as she lay between her mother and McBain in their bed when she was just 12-years-old, and it progressed to repeated sexual assaults. McBain also impersonated former teammate, Jason Krischuk, whom McBain's stepdaughter had said she had a crush on. Posing as Krischuk, McBain used a false email account to contact his stepdaughter, initiate sexually explicit conversations, and obtain nude photographs of her. Once the girl reported the assaults to her mother, the mother confronted McBain and contacted police to file charges. McBain eventually fled Nevada to a family member's residence in Oregon, where he attempted suicide by overdosing on sleeping pills. McBain was eventually admitted to a local hospital and was later visited by the victim's mother, where he confessed to the allegations of sexually assaulting her daughter. He also wrote the girl an apology letter, which was seized by police and entered in as evidence. McBain eventually returned to Nevada and turned himself in at the Clark County Detention Center. That September, per a plea deal, McBain pled guilty to the attempted sexual assault of a minor under the age of 14, and attempted lewdness with a minor under the age of 14. He was sentenced to serve 4-to-15-years in prison, and is required to register as a sex offender for the rest of his life.

== Career statistics ==
=== Regular season and playoffs ===
			Regular season					Playoffs
Season	Team	League	GP	G	A	Pts	PIM	GP	G	A	Pts	PIM
1993–94	Red Deer Rebels	WHL	58	4	13	17	41	4	0	0	0	0
1994–95	Red Deer Rebels	WHL	68	6	28	34	55	—	—	—	—	—
1995–96	Red Deer Rebels	WHL	68	7	34	41	68	10	1	7	8	10
1996–97	Red Deer Rebels	WHL	59	14	35	49	55	15	1	6	7	9
1997–98	Adirondack Red Wings	AHL	42	2	13	15	28	—	—	—	—	—
1997–98	Tampa Bay Lightning	NHL	27	0	1	1	8	—	—	—	—	—
1998–99	Cleveland Lumberjacks	IHL	81	22	21	43	64	—	—	—	—	—
1998–99	Tampa Bay Lightning	NHL	37	0	6	6	14	—	—	—	—	—
1999–00	Detroit Vipers	IHL	16	0	3	3	4	—	—	—	—	—
1999–00	Quebec Citadelles	AHL	53	5	7	12	34	3	0	0	0	2
2000–01	Quebec Citadelles	AHL	50	0	2	2	31	—	—	—	—	—
2000–01	Chicago Wolves	IHL	13	0	1	1	2	3	0	0	0	0
2001–02	Bracknell Bees	BISL	45	4	16	20	36	6	0	0	0	4
2002–03	Bracknell Bees	BISL	32	3	10	13	38	16	1	2	3	2
2003–04	Las Vegas Wranglers	ECHL	72	5	20	25	95	5	0	2	2	8
2004–05	Las Vegas Wranglers	ECHL	60	2	13	15	65	—	—	—	—	—
2005–06	Las Vegas Wranglers	ECHL	68	2	23	25	59	13	0	1	1	8
2006–07	Las Vegas Wranglers	ECHL	56	2	7	9	45	10	0	1	1	16
2007–08	Las Vegas Wranglers	ECHL	2	0	0	0	6	—	—	—	—	—
NHL totals			64	0	7	7	22	—	—	—	—	—

Medal record

Representing United States

Ice hockey

World Junior Championships
Silver medal – second place	1997 Switzerland	

=== International ===
Year	Team	Event	Result	GP	G	A	Pts	PIM
1996	United States	WJC	5th	5	0	2	2	2
1997	United States	WJC	2nd place, silver medalist(s)	6	0	0	0	6
Junior totals				11	0	2	2	8
