= Chris Ferraro =

American ice hockey player (born 1973)

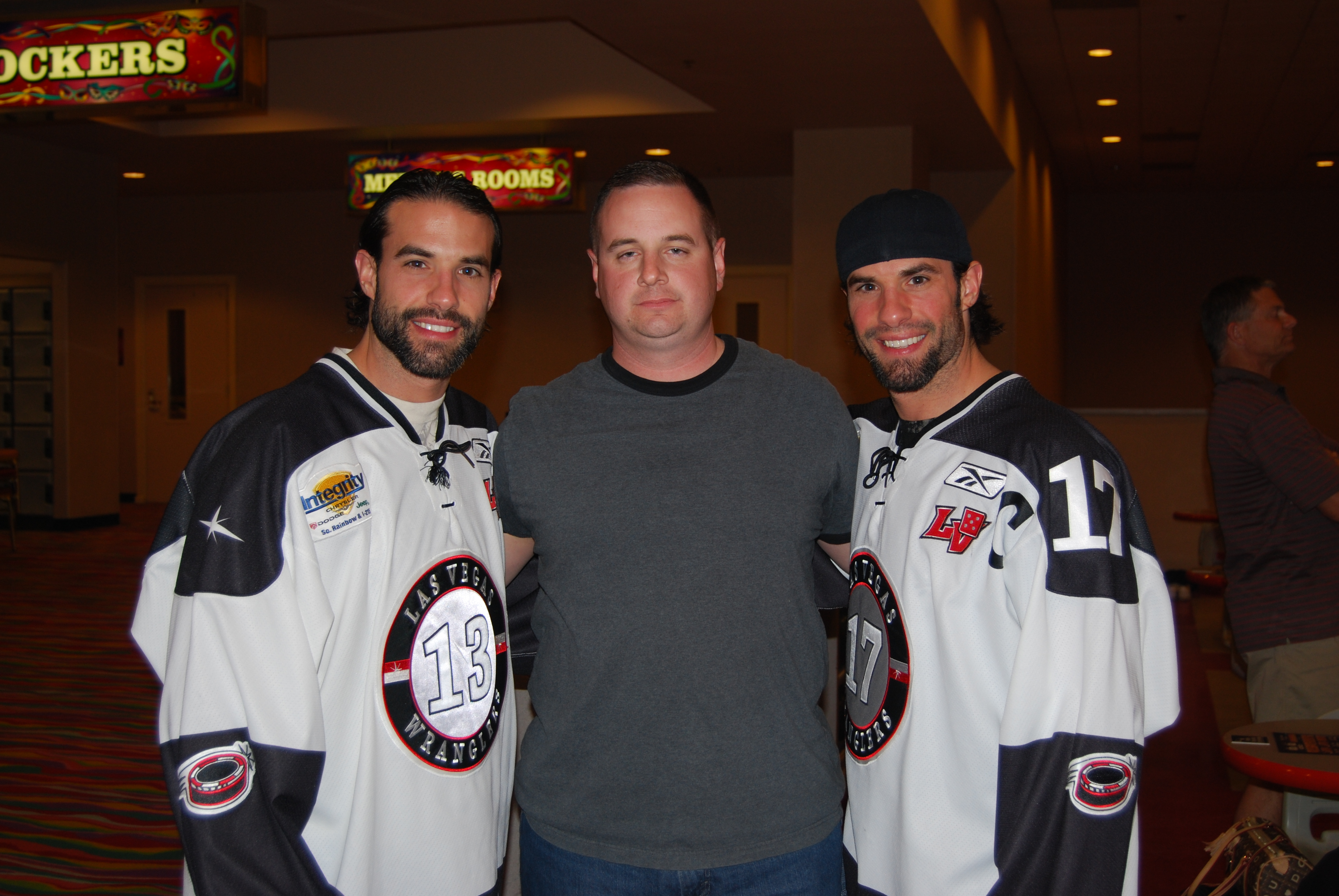
- Born: January 24, 1973 (age 53) Port Jefferson, New York, U.S.
- Height: 5 ft 11 in (180 cm)
- Weight: 195 lb (88 kg; 13 st 13 lb)
- Position: Center
- Shot: Right
- Played for: New York Rangers; Pittsburgh Penguins; Edmonton Oilers; New York Islanders; Washington Capitals
- National team: United States
- NHL draft: 85th overall, 1992; New York Rangers
- Playing career: 1994–2009
- Website: Chris Ferraro

Christopher M. Ferraro (born January 24, 1973) is an American former professional ice hockey player who formerly played in the National Hockey League. Along with his twin brother, Peter, became the second set of identical twins to play on the same NHL team: the New York Rangers in the 1995–96 season.

== Playing career ==
As a youth, Ferraro and his brother Peter played in the 1985, 1986 and 1987 Quebec International Pee-Wee Hockey Tournaments with the Philadelphia Flyers and New York Rangers minor ice hockey teams.

Chris Ferraro was the later of the Ferraro twins to be drafted into the NHL. He was drafted in the fourth round, 85th overall, in the 1992 NHL entry draft by the Rangers. During his NHL career, he played for the Rangers, Pittsburgh Penguins, Edmonton Oilers, New York Islanders and Washington Capitals. He also represented the United States at the World Junior Hockey Championships in 1992 and 1993, and at the World Championships in 2003.

Ferraro played in Germany with the DEG Metro Stars in the 2005–06 season before returning to the American Hockey League with the San Antonio Rampage. He joined his brother playing with the Las Vegas Wranglers for the 2007–08 season. During a March 1, 2008 game against the Victoria Salmon Kings, he was the victim of a sucker punch that knocked him unconscious and resulted in a concussion. Ferarro pursued assault charges against his opponent, Robin Gomez, though Gomez was acquitted. Ferraro returned for the 2008–09 season for the Wranglers before ending his professional career to develop a training center for young players in Long Island.

The brothers inducted into the Suffolk Sports Hall of Fame on Long Island in the Hockey Category with the Class of 2012.

Chris and his brother Peter built the Twin Rinks facility at Nassau County's Eisenhower Park. But cost overruns led to its bankruptcy in 2015, and the Islanders purchased it to serve as their practice facility.

== Personal ==
Chris married Jennifer, his college sweetheart from the University of Maine in 2001. Three months later, his wife was diagnosed with stomach cancer and, after a 13-month battle, died on November 5, 2002. In dedication, Chris set up the Jennifer Ferraro Foundation to help further research in stomach cancer.

== Career statistics ==
=== Regular season and playoffs ===
			Regular season					Playoffs
Season	Team	League	GP	G	A	Pts	PIM	GP	G	A	Pts	PIM
1990–91	Dubuque Fighting Saints	USHL	45	53	44	97	84	—	—	—	—	—
1991–92	Dubuque Fighting Saints	USHL	20	30	19	49	52	—	—	—	—	—
1991–92	Waterloo Blackhawks	USHL	18	19	31	50	54	—	—	—	—	—
1992–93	University of Maine	HE	39	25	26	51	46	—	—	—	—	—
1993–94	University of Maine	HE	4	0	1	1	8	—	—	—	—	—
1993–94	United States National Team	Intl	48	8	34	42	58	—	—	—	—	—
1994–95	Atlanta Knights	IHL	54	13	14	27	72	—	—	—	—	—
1994–95	Binghamton Rangers	AHL	13	6	4	10	38	10	2	3	5	16
1995–96	Binghamton Rangers	AHL	77	32	67	99	208	4	4	2	6	13
1995–96	New York Rangers	NHL	2	1	0	1	0	—	—	—	—	—
1996–97	Binghamton Rangers	AHL	53	29	34	63	94	—	—	—	—	—
1996–97	New York Rangers	NHL	12	1	1	2	6	—	—	—	—	—
1997–98	Pittsburgh Penguins	NHL	46	3	4	7	43	—	—	—	—	—
1998–99	Edmonton Oilers	NHL	2	1	0	1	0	—	—	—	—	—
1998–99	Hamilton Bulldogs	AHL	72	35	41	76	104	11	8	5	13	20
1999–00	Chicago Wolves	IHL	25	7	18	25	40	16	5	8	13	14
1999–00	Providence Bruins	AHL	21	9	9	18	32	—	—	—	—	—
1999–00	New York Islanders	NHL	11	1	3	4	8	—	—	—	—	—
2000–01	Albany River Rats	AHL	74	24	42	66	111	—	—	—	—	—
2001–02	Portland Pirates	AHL	2	1	1	2	6	—	—	—	—	—
2001–02	Washington Capitals	NHL	1	0	1	1	0	—	—	—	—	—
2002–03	Portland Pirates	AHL	57	19	32	51	121	3	0	1	1	6
2003–04	Springfield Falcons	AHL	64	14	24	38	137	—	—	—	—	—
2004–05	Södertälje SK	SEL	12	1	4	5	26	—	—	—	—	—
2004–05	Syracuse Crunch	AHL	24	7	7	14	50	—	—	—	—	—
2005–06	DEG Metro Stars	DEL	42	6	22	28	134	14	2	3	5	28
2006–07	Hartford Wolf Pack	AHL	1	0	0	0	0	—	—	—	—	—
2006–07	Phoenix Roadrunners	ECHL	3	2	1	3	4	—	—	—	—	—
2006–07	San Antonio Rampage	AHL	49	10	26	36	54	—	—	—	—	—
2007–08	Las Vegas Wranglers	ECHL	46	12	39	51	95	3	0	1	1	6
2008–09	Las Vegas Wranglers	ECHL	64	21	25	46	119	—	—	—	—	—
AHL totals			507	186	288	474	955	28	14	11	25	55
NHL totals			74	7	9	16	57	—	—	—	—	—

=== International ===
Medal record

Ice hockey

Representing (United States) USA

World Junior Championships
Bronze medal – third place	1992 Germany	

Year	Team	Event	Result	GP	G	A	Pts	PIM
1992	United States	WJC	3rd place, bronze medalist(s)	7	4	3	7	2
1993	United States	WJC	4th	7	4	7	11	8
2003	United States	WC	13th	6	0	2	2	18
Junior totals				14	8	10	18	10
Senior totals				6	0	2	2	18

== Awards and honors ==
Award	Year
All-Hockey East Rookie Team	1992–93
AHL Fred T. Hunt Memorial Award	2002–03
