= Rob Hennigar =

Canadian ice hockey player (born 1983)

- Born: April 4, 1983 (age 43) Jordan, Ontario, Canada
- Height: 5 ft 11 in (180 cm)
- Weight: 194 lb (88 kg; 13 st 12 lb)
- Position: Centre
- Shot: Left
- Played for: AHL; Bridgeport Sound Tigers; Albany River Rats; ECHL; Utah Grizzlies; Florida Everblades; Victoria Salmon Kings; CIS; UNB Varsity Reds; Serie A SG Cortina; 2.GBun; Schwenningen ERC
- NHL draft: Undrafted
- Playing career: 2008–2013

Rob Hennigar (born April 4, 1983) is a Canadian former professional ice hockey player and current head coach of the UNB Reds, having previously played four seasons with the team between 2004–08.

== Collegiate career ==
During the course of his collegiate career with the Varsity Reds, Hennigar set team records for all of: points (212 - first player to eclipse 200), assists (156), as well as postseason points (35). He was also a First-Team member of UNB's Triple Century Club having eclipsed 100 games (108), 100 assists (131) & 100 points (177) in regular season play. He won a CIS University Cup with UNB in 2007.

Hennigar was a member of the CIS Men's Hockey team, composed solely of players from the AUS, that represented Canada at the 2007 FISU Winter Universiade in Turin, Italy. Team Canada won gold with a 3-1 victory over Russia, with Hennigar registering two goals in the championship game.

In March 2012, Hennigar was selected as a 'First Team' UNB All-Decade team member for the 2000s as part of UNB's hosting of the 50th CIS University Cup.

== Career statistics ==
			Regular season					Playoffs
Season	Team	League	GP	G	A	Pts	PIM	GP	G	A	Pts	PIM
2000–01	Windsor Spitfires	OHL	43	7	13	20	27	5	0	1	1	4
2001–02	Windsor Spitfires	OHL	67	15	32	47	51	16	5	7	12	10
2002–03	Windsor Spitfires	OHL	68	29	46	75	56	7	3	4	7	6
2003–04	Windsor Spitfires	OHL	68	32	47	79	64	4	1	2	3	0
2004–05	University of New Brunswick	AUS	28	9	26	35	26	—	—	—	—	—
2005–06	University of New Brunswick	AUS	28	9	33	42	32	—	—	—	—	—
2006–07	University of New Brunswick	AUS	25	13	29	42	14	—	—	—	—	—
2007–08	University of New Brunswick	AUS	27	15	43	58	12	—	—	—	—	—
2008–09	Bridgeport Sound Tigers	AHL	34	3	10	13	18	4	1	0	1	2
2008–09	Utah Grizzlies	ECHL	38	15	44	59	40	—	—	—	—	—
2009–10	Florida Everblades	ECHL	17	8	15	23	10	—	—	—	—	—
2009–10	Albany River Rats	AHL	6	0	5	5	0	—	—	—	—	—
2010–11	Victoria Salmon Kings	ECHL	61	9	54	63	40	11	0	12	12	6
2011–12	SG Cortina	Serie A	35	18	41	59	50	9	4	5	9	4
2012–13	Schwenningen ERC	2.GBun	41	10	27	37	50	15	6	12	18	16
AHL totals			40	3	15	18	18	4	1	0	1	2

== Awards and honours ==
Award	Year	Ref
AUS Rookie-of-the-Year	2004–05	
AUS Second Team All-Star	2005–06	
CIS All-Canadian Second Team	2006–07	
CIS All-Canadian First Team	2007–08	
CIS Senator Joseph A. Sullivan Trophy (Player of the Year)	2007–08	
