= Matt Stefanishion =

Canadian ice hockey player

- Born: October 5, 1983 (age 42) Daysland, Alberta, Canada
- Height: 6 ft 3 in (191 cm)
- Weight: 210 lb (95 kg; 15 st 0 lb)
- Position: Right wing
- Shoots: Right
- NCHL team Former teams: Devon Barons; Alaska Aces; Charlotte Checkers; Peoria Rivermen; Victoria Salmon Kings; Columbia Inferno; Hartford Wolf Pack; Hershey Bears
- Playing career: 2006–present

Matt Stefanishion (born October 5, 1983) is a Canadian professional ice hockey right wing.

== Early life ==
Stefanishion was born in Daysland, Alberta, Canada. After playing two seasons in the Saskatchewan Junior Hockey League with the Melville Millionaires, Stefanishion entered Ferris State University. He played two seasons with the Bulldogs, being named as an honourable mention to the CCHA All-Rookie Team in the 2004–05 season.

== Career ==
Stefanishion was not selected in the NHL entry draft; however, he was signed to a two-year contract by the Washington Capitals on April 1, 2006. He also played for the Stony Plain Eagles of the Senior AAA Allan Cup Hockey West.

Stefanishion has had a journeyman career throughout the ECHL and to a lesser extent the American Hockey League, suiting up for six separate ECHL teams as well as the Hershey Bears, Hartford Wolf Pack, and Peoria Rivermen of the AHL. Stefanishion's last season playing for either an ECHL or AHL team was 2010–11, which he spent with the Victoria Salmon Kings.
