= 2005–06 Victoria Salmon Kings season =

2005-06 Victoria Salmon Kings
- League: 20th ECHL
- Division: 5th West
- Conference: 9th National
- 2005-06 record: 26-37-9
- Home record: 12-16-8
- Road record: 14-21-1
- Goals for: 204
- Goals against: 261

Team information
- General manager: Bryan Maxwell (Oct-Jan); Dan Belisle
- Coach: Bryan Maxwell (Oct-Jan); Troy Ward
- Assistant coach: Mark Morrison
- Captain: Ryan Wade
- Arena: Save-On-Foods Memorial Centre
- Average attendance: 4,230

Team leaders
- Goals: Lanny Gare; Steve Lingren (22)
- Assists: Adam Taylor (38)
- Points: Adam Taylor (57)
- Penalty minutes: Adam Huxley (151)
- Plus/minus: Taggart Desmet (+4)
- Wins: Rob McVicar (13)
- Goals against average: Rob McVicar (3.27)

The 2005–06 Victoria Salmon Kings season is the Salmon Kings' 2nd season in the ECHL. After a disappointing inaugural season that posted 15 wins, the Salmon Kings looked to improve in the 2005-06 season. Although the Salmon Kings improved its win total to 26 it was still not enough to clinch their first playoff berth. Their inability to show any signs of improvement midway through the season caused the organization to fire general manager and head coach, Bryan Maxwell who was then replaced by new general manager, Dan Belisle and new head coach, Troy Ward. The few bright spots for the Salmon Kings was Adam Taylor and defensemen, Steve Lingren who were both named starters on the National Conference ECHL All-Star team. Taylor led the team with 57 points, while Lingren scored a team leading 15 power play goals and tied for the team lead with 22 goals, alongside Lanny Gare.

== Standings ==
West Division	GP	W	L	T	Pts	GF	GA
Alaska Aces (z)	72	53	12	7	113	289	168
Las Vegas Wranglers	72	53	13	6	112	267	176
Idaho Steelheads	72	43	21	8	94	268	221
Utah Grizzlies	72	36	30	6	78	235	236
Victoria Salmon Kings	72	26	37	9	61	204	261
Phoenix RoadRunners	72	20	47	5	45	156	263

== Schedule and results ==
=== Regular season ===
2005–06 Game log

October: 1–3–0–0 (Home: 0–0–0–0; Road: 1–3–0–0)
#	Date	Visitor	Score	Home	OT	Decision	Attendance	Record	Pts
1	October 21	Victoria	1–2	Fresno		Boxma	4,322	0–1–0	0
2	October 22	Victoria	3–5	Bakersfield		Boxma	8,263	0–2–0	0
3	October 28	Victoria	8–5	Utah		Muntain	1,625	1–2–0	2
4	October 29	Victoria	3–6	Utah		Muntain	3,128	1–3–0	2

November: 5–9–1–0 (Home: 3–2–1–0; Road: 2–7–0–0)
#	Date	Visitor	Score	Home	OT	Decision	Attendance	Record	Pts
5	November 2	Victoria	2–1	Trenton		Muntain	2,563	2–3–0	4
6	November 4	Victoria	1–2	Dayton		Muntain	2,610	2–4–0	4
7	November 5	Victoria	3–5	Toledo		Muntain	4,251	2–5–0	4
8	November 6	Victoria	3–7	Wheeling		Muntain	2,042	2–6–0	4
9	November 10	Stockton	2–5	Victoria		Muntain	6,406	3–6–0	6
10	November 11	Stockton	2–1	Victoria	OT	Muntain	4,780	3–6–1	7
11	November 12	Stockton	4–6	Victoria		Muntain	4,770	4–6–1	9
12	November 16	Idaho	5–2	Victoria		Muntain	3,957	4–7–1	9
13	November 18	Idaho	6–3	Victoria		Boxma	4,427	4–8–1	9
14	November 19	Idaho	2–3	Victoria	OT	Boxma	4,575	5–8–1	11
15	November 21	Victoria	2–3	Phoenix		Boxma	3,243	5–9–1	11
16	November 23	Victoria	4–2	San Diego		Currie	3,064	6–9–1	13
17	November 26	Victoria	1–3	Las Vegas		Boxma	4,539	6–10–1	13
18	November 27	Victoria	3–6	Long Beach		Currie	1,611	6–11–1	13
19	November 29	Victoria	1–3	Phoenix		Boxma	3,014	6–12–1	13

December: 5–9–0–0 (Home: 2–4–0–0; Road: 3–5–0–0)
#	Date	Visitor	Score	Home	OT	Decision	Attendance	Record	Pts
20	December 2	Utah	4–5	Victoria	OT	Currie	4,746	7–12–1	15
21	December 3	Utah	5–3	Victoria		Boxma	4,111	7–13–1	15
22	December 4	Utah	3–1	Victoria		Currie	3,703	7–14–1	15
23	December 7	Victoria	4–2	Idaho		McVicar	3,747	8–14–1	17
24	December 9	Victoria	5–1	Idaho		Currie	4,301	9–14–1	19
25	December 10	Victoria	2–5	Idaho		McVicar	4,510	9–15–1	19
26	December 16	Alaska	4–5	Victoria	OT	McVicar	4,248	10–15–1	21
27	December 17	Alaska	8–0	Victoria		Currie	4,443	10–16–1	21
28	December 19	Alaska	4–1	Victoria		McVicar	4,424	10–17–1	21
29	December 21	Victoria	1–4	Utah		McVicar	2,743	10–18–1	21
30	December 22	Victoria	2–5	Utah		McVicar	2,780	10–19–1	21
31	December 28	Victoria	0–4	Alaska		Currie	6,351	10–20–1	21
32	December 30	Victoria	5–6	Alaska		Currie	6,269	10–21–1	21
33	December 31	Victoria	5–3	Alaska		McVicar	5,884	11–21–1	23

January: 4–4–1–1 (Home: 1–2–1–1; Road: 3–2–0–0)
#	Date	Visitor	Score	Home	OT	Decision	Attendance	Record	Pts
34	January 5	Fresno	3–5	Victoria		McVicar	3,856	12–21–1	25
35	January 6	Fresno	4–3	Victoria		McVicar	4,360	12–22–1	25
36	January 7	Fresno	6–2	Victoria		McVicar	4,633	12–23–1	25
37	January 12	Victoria	7–5	Idaho		McVicar	3,465	13–23–1	27
38	January 13	Victoria	3–2	Idaho	OT	McVicar	4,581	14–23–1	29
39	January 20	Victoria	6–2	Bakersfield		McVicar	5,518	15–23–1	31
40	January 21	Victoria	0–3	Bakersfield		McVicar	6,330	15–24–1	31
41	January 22	Victoria	0–2	Long Beach		Currie	1,775	15–25–1	31
42	January 27	Phoenix	6–5	Victoria	SO	Boxma	4,466	15–25–2	32
43	January 28	Phoenix	1–0	Victoria	OT	Boxma	4,659	15–25–3	33

February: 3–5–2–1 (Home: 2–3–2–1; Road: 1–2–0–0)
#	Date	Visitor	Score	Home	OT	Decision	Attendance	Record	Pts
44	February 1	Augusta	3–4	Victoria		Boxma	3,731	16–25–3	35
45	February 3	Augusta	4–3	Victoria	OT	McVicar	3,744	16–25–4	36
46	February 4	Augusta	3–1	Victoria		Boxma	3,956	16–26–4	36
47	February 8	Long Beach	4–0	Victoria		Boxma	3,634	16–27–4	36
48	February 10	Long Beach	5–2	Victoria		McVicar	3,824	16–28–4	36
49	February 11	Long Beach	5–4	Victoria	SO	Boxma	4,052	16–28–5	37
50	February 17	Victoria	3–5	Phoenix		Boxma	4,955	16–29–5	37
51	February 18	Victoria	3–4	San Diego		Boxma	12,240	16–30–5	37
52	February 21	Victoria	3–2	Las Vegas	OT	Boxma	3,865	17–30–5	39
53	February 24	Alaska	3–2	Victoria	OT	Boxma	4,383	17–30–6	40
54	February 25	Alaska	3–4	Victoria	SO	Boxma	4,153	18–30–6	42

March: 7–5–2–1 (Home: 3–4–1–1; Road: 4–1–1–0)
#	Date	Visitor	Score	Home	OT	Decision	Attendance	Record	Pts
55	March 3	Bakersfield	4–3	Victoria	SO	Boxma	3,778	18–30–7	43
56	March 4	Bakersfield	2–4	Victoria		McVicar	3,895	19–30–7	45
57	March 5	Bakersfield	4–0	Victoria		McVicar	3,637	19–31–7	45
58	March 8	Las Vegas	6–2	Victoria		Boxma	3,587	19–32–7	45
59	March 10	Las Vegas	3–2	Victoria		McVicar	3,965	19–33–7	45
60	March 11	Las Vegas	4–1	Victoria		McVicar	3,787	19–34–7	45
61	March 15	San Diego	3–4	Victoria	OT	McVicar	4,386	20–34–7	47
62	March 17	San Diego	1–3	Victoria		McVicar	3,820	21–34–7	49
63	March 18	San Diego	4–3	Victoria	SO	McVicar	3,997	21–34–8	50
64	March 20	Victoria	5–0	Phoenix		McVicar	3,139	22–34–8	52
65	March 22	Victoria	4–3	Long Beach		McVicar	1,124	23–34–8	54
66	March 24	Victoria	2–4	Stockton		McVicar	10,117	23–35–8	54
67	March 25	Victoria	3–2	Stockton		Boxma	8,675	24–35–8	56
68	March 27	Victoria	3–4	Fresno	OT	Boxma	3,205	24–35–9	57
69	March 31	Victoria	4–3	Alaska	OT	McVicar	6,451	25–35–9	59

April: 1–2–0–0 (Home: 1–1–0–0; Road: 0–1–0–0)
#	Date	Visitor	Score	Home	OT	Decision	Attendance	Record	Pts
70	April 1	Victoria	0–3	Alaska		McVicar	6,451	25–36–9	59
71	April 7	Utah	3–0	Victoria		McVicar	4,619	25–37–9	59
72	April 8	Utah	4–7	Victoria		Boxma	4,775	26–37–9	61

Legend: Win (2 points) Loss (0 points) Overtime/shootout loss (1 point)

== Player stats ==
=== Skaters ===
Note: GP = Games played; G = Goals; A = Assists; Pts = Points; +/- = Plus/minus; PIM = Penalty minutes

Regular season

Player	GP	G	A	Pts	+/-	PIM
Adam Taylor	72	19	38	57	-7	54
Lanny Gare	67	22	33	55	-17	62
Jade Galbraith ^{†}	53	18	31	49	-8	49
Steve Lingren	62	22	25	47	+2	77
Mike Wirll	39	11	28	39	-15	26
Ryan Wade	56	18	20	38	-17	139
Simon Mangos	72	9	19	28	-17	36
Kurt Drummond	50	4	24	28	-24	39
Seth Leonard	67	13	14	27	-8	32
Steve Roberts	34	14	9	23	+3	10
K.C. Timmons	49	12	8	20	+3	51
Nathan Forster	58	6	14	20	-17	66
Taggart Desmet	12	3	14	17	+4	4
Dustan Heintz	26	5	8	13	0	45
Mike Josephson	39	5	8	13	-5	86
Tyler Shybunka	17	5	4	9	-10	8
Pat Sutton ^{†}	53	0	8	8	-4	77
Adam Huxley ^{†}	39	3	4	7	-8	151
Mike Henderson	14	4	2	6	-3	4
Elias Godoy	9	2	3	5	+1	0
Chad Dameworth	62	1	4	5	-13	53
Aaron MacInnis ^{‡}	6	1	2	3	-3	4
Dallas Anderson ^{†}	21	1	2	3	-11	131
Joel Andresen	42	0	3	3	-4	44
Pete Gardiner ^{‡}	13	2	0	2	-6	19
Ryan Thrussell	12	0	2	2	-2	6
Brad Cook ^{‡}	12	0	2	2	-6	6
Ryan McLeod	13	0	2	2	-6	6
Derek Allan	6	1	0	1	-2	8
Josh Garbutt	7	1	0	1	-2	2
Chip Dunleavy	16	1	0	1	-7	2
Jan Sochor	5	0	1	1	+1	2
Derek Campbell	14	0	1	1	-8	23
Mark Olafson	1	0	0	0	0	0
Mark Ashton	2	0	0	0	-2	0
Greg Black ^{†}	4	0	0	0	-2	34

=== Goaltenders ===
Note: GP = Games played; Min = Minutes played; W = Wins; L = Losses; T = Ties; GA = Goals against; GAA= Goals against average; Sv% = Save percentage; SO= Shutouts

Regular season

Player	GP	Min	W	L	T	GA	GAA	Sv%	SO
Lance Mayes	2	55	0	0	0	3	3.27	.850	0
Rob McVicar	33	1741	13	14	2	95	3.27	.902	1
B.J. Boxma	28	1453	6	12	6	82	3.39	.895	0
David Currie ^{†‡}	10	541	3	6	0	34	3.77	.875	0
Robert Muntain	11	565	4	5	1	38	4.04	.878	0

^{†}Denotes player spent time with another team before joining Victoria. Stats reflect time with the Salmon Kings only.
^{‡}Denotes player no longer with the team. Stats reflect time with Salmon Kings only.

== Transactions ==
=== Trades ===
September 12, 2005	To Victoria Salmon Kings Simon Mangos; Aaron MacInnis	To Texas Wildcatters Ryan Finnerty
September 22, 2005	To Victoria Salmon Kings Dustan Heintz	To Johnstown Chiefs Cash
February 7, 2006	To Victoria Salmon Kings Jay Latulippe	To Dayton Bombers David Currie
February 27, 2006	To Victoria Salmon Kings Greg Black	To Florida Everblades Cash
