= 2006–07 Victoria Salmon Kings season =

2006-07 Victoria Salmon Kings
- League: 17th ECHL
- Division: 3rd West
- Conference: 7th National
- 2006-07 record: 36-32-1-3
- Home record: 21-14-0-1
- Road record: 15-18-1-2
- Goals for: 239
- Goals against: 249

Team information
- General manager: Dan Belisle
- Coach: Tony MacAuley (Oct-Dec); Mark Morrison
- Assistant coach: Mark Morrison (Oct-Dec)
- Captain: Kiel McLeod
- Alternate captains: Ryan Wade; Steve Lingren
- Arena: Save-On-Foods Memorial Centre
- Average attendance: 4,248

Team leaders
- Goals: Wes Goldie (41)
- Assists: François-Pierre Guenette (42)
- Points: Wes Goldie (74)
- Penalty minutes: Daryl Lloyd (152)
- Plus/minus: Phil Cole (+10)
- Wins: Julien Ellis (21)
- Goals against average: Julien Ellis (3.21)

The 2006–07 Victoria Salmon Kings season is the Salmon Kings' 3rd season in the ECHL. On July 18, 2006, before the start of the 2006-07 season, the Salmon Kings' Vice President of Hockey Operations and General Manager Dan Belisle signed an affiliation agreement with the Vancouver Canucks and its AHL affiliate, the Manitoba Moose. Through the affiliation agreement, the Canucks assigned goaltender Julien Ellis; forwards Marc Andre-Bernier, F.P. Guenette and defenseman Patrick Coulombe, while the Moose assigned defensemen Matt Kelly and forward Shaun Heshka. Along with this move, Dan Belisle also signed Wes Goldie, Milan Gajic, Kiel McLeod, and Mike Stutzel to ECHL contracts to play for the Salmon Kings. Through these moves, the Salmon Kings hoped to become a powerhouse in its third season. However, under their new head coach Tony MacAuley, the team struggled through the first half of the season, which caused Belisle to fire MacAuley, after three months behind the bench. Dan Belisle would then hire assistant coach Mark Morrison to become the fourth head coach in Salmon Kings' history. Belisle's other mid-season move included a big trade with the Pensacola Ice Pilots and traded Adam Taylor, and David Wrigley, for Jordan Krestanovich and his brother, Derek Krestanovich. Through these mid-season moves, the Salmon Kings started to respond going on a late-season run and finishing their remaining regular season games on a nine-game winning streak. With the nine-game winning streak, the Salmon Kings completed their season with a 36-32-1-3 record and finished 7th overall in the National Conference to play against the Alaska Aces in their first playoff appearance. The Salmon Kings would eventually win Game 1 by a score of 3–2, but the Aces managed to win their next 4 out of 5 games to win the series 4–2. One of the season highlights for the Salmon Kings, was forward Wes Goldie who led the team and the National Conference with 41 goals.

== Standings ==
=== Division standings ===
West Division	GP	W	L	OTL	SOL	Pts	GF	GA
Alaska Aces (STL)	72	49	16	3	4	105	270	176
Idaho Steelheads (DAL)	72	42	24	2	4	90	240	208
Victoria Salmon Kings (VAN)	72	36	32	1	3	76	239	249
Phoenix RoadRunners (PHX)	72	27	40	2	3	59	201	255
Utah Grizzlies (Independent)	72	22	42	4	4	52	184	294

=== Conference standings ===
National Conference	GP	W	L	OTL	SOL	PTS	GF	GA
Las Vegas Wranglers (CGY)	72	46	12	6	8	106	231	187
Alaska Aces (STL)	72	49	16	3	4	105	270	176
Bakersfield Condors (Independent)	72	41	19	3	9	94	270	236
Idaho Steelheads (DAL)	72	42	24	2	4	90	240	208
Stockton Thunder (EDM)	72	38	24	5	5	86	225	197
Fresno Falcons (SJ)	72	34	29	5	4	77	195	197
Victoria Salmon Kings (VAN)	72	36	32	1	3	76	239	249
Phoenix RoadRunners (PHX)	72	27	40	2	3	59	201	255
Long Beach Ice Dogs (BOS)	72	27	42	0	3	57	209	267
Utah Grizzlies (Independent)	72	22	42	4	4	52	184	294

== Schedule and results ==
=== Regular season ===
2006–07 Game log

October: 1–3–0–1 (Home: 1–1–0–1; Road: 0–2–0–0)
#	Date	Visitor	Score	Home	OT	Decision	Attendance	Record	Pts
1	October 20	Victoria	3–5	Alaska		Belitski	6,451	0–1–0–0	0
2	October 21	Victoria	2–4	Alaska		Belitski	5,389	0–2–0–0	0
3	October 25	Idaho	4–0	Victoria		Bridges	4,883	0–3–0–0	0
4	October 27	Idaho	6–5	Victoria	SO	Belitski	4,168	0–3–0–1	1
5	October 28	Idaho	3–7	Victoria		Bridges	4,162	1–3–0–1	3

November: 6–5–0–0 (Home: 3–3–0–0; Road: 3–2–0–0)
#	Date	Visitor	Score	Home	OT	Decision	Attendance	Record	Pts
6	November 3	Victoria	2–4	Las Vegas		Ellis	5,892	1–4–0–1	3
7	November 4	Victoria	5–4	Las Vegas	OT	Ellis	5,089	2–4–0–1	5
8	November 7	Victoria	3–2	Las Vegas	SO	Bridges	3,645	3–4–0–1	7
9	November 9	Fresno	3–6	Victoria		Ellis	3,520	4–4–0–1	9
10	November 11	Fresno	5–2	Victoria		Bridges	4,416	4–5–0–1	9
11	November 12	Fresno	3–4	Victoria		Ellis	3,723	5–5–0–1	11
12	November 16	Stockton	3–4	Victoria	OT	Ellis	3,418	6–5–0–1	13
13	November 17	Stockton	6–3	Victoria		Ellis	4,381	6–6–0–1	13
14	November 24	Victoria	3–7	Utah		Bridges	4,533	6–7–0–1	13
15	November 25	Victoria	5–3	Utah		Ellis	4,015	7–7–0–1	15
16	November 29	Alaska	6–1	Victoria		Ellis	3,834	7–8–0–1	15

December: 3–10–0–0 (Home: 3–4–0–0; Road: 0–6–0–0)
#	Date	Visitor	Score	Home	OT	Decision	Attendance	Record	Pts
17	December 1	Alaska	3–0	Victoria		Ellis	3,647	7–9–0–1	15
18	December 2	Alaska	9–6	Victoria		Ellis	3,598	7–10–0–1	15
19	December 6	Long Beach	5–4	Victoria		Bridges	3,396	7–11–0–1	15
20	December 8	Long Beach	2–3	Victoria		Ellis	3,650	8–11–0–1	17
21	December 9	Long Beach	1–3	Victoria		Ellis	3,854	9–11–0–1	19
22	December 12	Victoria	2–4	Phoenix		Ellis	2,959	9–12–0–1	19
23	December 15	Victoria	2–4	Long Beach		Ellis	1,770	9–13–0–1	19
24	December 16	Victoria	4–6	Bakersfield		Ellis	5,805	9–14–0–1	19
25	December 17	Victoria	1–3	Fresno		Bridges	3,913	9–15–0–1	19
26	December 21	Victoria	2–4	Phoenix		Ellis	2,972	9–16–0–1	19
27	December 23	Victoria	2–4	Phoenix		Ellis	3,629	9–17–0–1	19
28	December 29	Alaska	2–3	Victoria		Ellis	4,874	10–17–0–1	21
29	December 30	Alaska	5–4	Victoria		Ellis	4,440	10–18–0–1	21

January: 8–8–0–0 (Home: 2–2–0–0; Road: 6–6–0–0)
#	Date	Visitor	Score	Home	OT	Decision	Attendance	Record	Pts
30	January 1	Alaska	2–3	Victoria	SO	Ellis	4,435	11–18–0–1	23
31	January 3	Victoria	6–4	Long Beach		Ellis	1,034	12–18–0–1	25
32	January 5	Victoria	1–4	Fresno		Bridges	4,155	12–19–0–1	25
33	January 6	Victoria	4–6	Bakersfield		Bridges	7,093	12–20–0–1	25
34	January 7	Victoria	1–3	Fresno		Bridges	3,098	12–21–0–1	25
35	January 9	Victoria	3–1	Las Vegas		Bridges	3,836	13–21–0–1	27
36	January 12	Victoria	2–3	Alaska		Bridges	4,532	13–22–0–1	27
37	January 13	Victoria	1–5	Alaska		Bridges	4,711	13–23–0–1	27
38	January 14	Victoria	2–7	Alaska		Bridges	5,031	13–24–0–1	27
39	January 19	Bakersfield	8–1	Victoria		Bridges	4,219	13–25–0–1	27
40	January 20	Bakersfield	5–6	Victoria	SO	Bridges	4,813	14–25–0–1	29
41	January 22	Bakersfield	4–2	Victoria		Bridges	3,426	14–26–0–1	29
42	January 24	Victoria	3–1	Long Beach		Bridges	1,393	15–26–0–1	31
43	January 26	Victoria	4–3	Bakersfield		Bridges	6,973	16–26–0–1	33
44	January 27	Victoria	6–5	Bakersfield	OT	Vincent	4,806	17–26–0–1	35
45	January 28	Victoria	6–3	Long Beach		Bridges	2,633	18–26–0–1	37

February: 6–5–0–0 (Home: 5–3–0–0; Road: 1–2–0–0)
#	Date	Visitor	Score	Home	OT	Decision	Attendance	Record	Pts
46	February 2	Idaho	1–3	Victoria		Bridges	4,197	19–26–0–1	39
47	February 3	Idaho	6–2	Victoria		Bridges	3,875	19–27–0–1	39
48	February 7	Victoria	1–2	Idaho		Bridges	3,385	19–28–0–1	39
49	February 9	Victoria	6–3	Idaho		Ellis	4,444	20–28–0–1	41
50	February 10	Victoria	0–2	Idaho		Ellis	5,055	20–29–0–1	41
51	February 14	Stockton	0–4	Victoria		Ellis	3,628	21–29–0–1	43
52	February 16	Stockton	3–6	Victoria		Ellis	3,869	22–29–0–1	45
53	February 17	Stockton	3–4	Victoria	OT	Ellis	4,417	23–29–0–1	47
54	February 21	Las Vegas	5–0	Victoria		Ellis	3,571	23–30–0–1	47
55	February 23	Las Vegas	2–3	Victoria	SO	Ellis	4,103	24–30–0–1	49
56	February 24	Las Vegas	3–0	Victoria		Ellis	4,266	24–31–0–1	49

March: 9–1–0–0 (Home: 4–1–0–0; Road: 5–0–1–2)
#	Date	Visitor	Score	Home	OT	Decision	Attendance	Record	Pts
57	March 2	Victoria	3–1	Fresno		Ellis	4,832	25–31–0–1	51
58	March 3	Victoria	4–3	Fresno	SO	Ellis	5,143	26–31–0–1	53
59	March 7	Victoria	1–2	Stockton	OT	Ellis	3,645	26–31–1–1	54
60	March 9	Victoria	4–5	Stockton	SO	Ellis	6,045	26–31–1–2	55
61	March 10	Victoria	3–4	Stockton	SO	Bridges	8,536	26–31–1–3	56
62	March 15	Utah	3–6	Victoria		Ellis	4,144	27–31–1–3	58
63	March 17	Utah	3–2	Victoria		Ellis	5,070	27–32–1–3	58
64	March 18	Utah	1–4	Victoria		Bridges	4,847	28–32–1–3	60
65	March 23	Long Beach	1–5	Victoria		Bridges	4,699	29–32–1–3	62
66	March 24	Long Beach	1–4	Victoria	SO	Bridges	4,801	30–32–1–3	64
67	March 28	Victoria	7–1	Utah		Bridges	2,940	31–32–1–3	66
68	March 30	Victoria	4–3	Utah	OT	Bridges	5,906	32–32–1–3	68
69	March 31	Victoria	5–1	Utah		Ellis	6,088	33–32–1–3	70

April: 3–0–0–0 (Home: 3–0–0–0; Road: 0–0–0–0)
#	Date	Visitor	Score	Home	OT	Decision	Attendance	Record	Pts
70	April 4	Phoenix	4–6	Victoria		Ellis	4,212	34–32–1–3	72
71	April 6	Phoenix	1–4	Victoria		Bridges	5,349	35–32–1–3	74
72	April 7	Phoenix	1–6	Victoria		Ellis	7,006	36–32–1–3	76

Legend: Win (2 points) Loss (0 points) Overtime/shootout loss (1 point)

=== Playoffs ===
2007 Kelly Cup playoffs

National Conference quarter-final vs. (2) Alaska Aces: Alaska won series 4–2
#	Date	Visitor	Score	Home	OT	Decision	Attendance	Series
1	April 9	Victoria	3–2	Alaska		Ellis	3,713	1–0
2	April 10	Victoria	1–7	Alaska		Ellis	4,112	1–1
3	April 12	Alaska	5–2	Victoria		Ellis	2,850	1–2
4	April 13	Alaska	5–2	Victoria		Bridges	3,395	1–3
5	April 14	Alaska	4–9	Victoria		Bridges	3,457	2–3
6	April 16	Victoria	2–5	Alaska		Ellis	4,937	2–4

Legend: Win Loss

== Player stats ==
=== Skaters ===
Note: GP = Games played; G = Goals; A = Assists; Pts = Points; +/- = Plus/minus; PIM = Penalty minutes

Regular season

Player	GP	G	A	Pts	+/-	PIM
Wes Goldie	72	41	33	74	-4	65
Milan Gajic	63	24	41	65	+9	70
Kiel McLeod	65	32	31	63	+5	116
François-Pierre Guenette	67	13	42	55	-8	28
Mike Stutzel	61	16	36	52	-9	61
Ryan Wade	70	9	29	38	-11	94
Jordan Krestanovich ^{†}	54	12	25	37	+4	14
Steve Lingren	62	7	27	34	+4	61
Marc-Andre Bernier	40	18	15	33	+4	32
Matt Kelly	59	9	15	24	-3	40
Seamus Young	72	9	13	22	+1	33
Derek Krestanovich ^{†}	52	7	13	20	-4	60
Daryl Lloyd	59	11	8	19	-7	152
Gustav Engman	61	5	12	17	-22	149
Phil Cole ^{†}	51	3	12	15	+10	105
Paul Ballantyne ^{†}	26	5	7	12	+5	17
David Wrigley ^{‡}	15	3	7	10	-4	12
Warren McCutcheon	27	4	4	8	-20	40
James DeMone	30	2	5	7	-13	34
Adam Taylor ^{‡}	15	1	5	6	-8	12
Robin Gomez	19	2	3	5	-1	66
Ryan Jorde	23	0	5	5	-9	34
Greg Hornby ^{‡}	36	1	2	3	-9	110
Patrick Coulombe	6	0	3	3	+6	2
Shaun Heshka	3	0	1	1	+1	4
Andy Zulyniak	12	0	1	1	-8	2
Rich Meloche^{‡}	2	0	0	0	+1	2
Brad Cook	3	0	0	0	0	6
Justin Spencer	5	0	0	0	0	6
Adam Keefe	8	0	0	0	-5	27

Playoffs

Player	GP	G	A	Pts	+/-	PIM
Wes Goldie	6	6	2	8	-3	0
Steve Lingren	6	2	5	7	-6	2
Jordan Krestanovich	6	1	6	7	-4	2
Mike Stutzel	5	1	3	4	-3	6
François-Pierre Guenette	6	0	4	4	-6	4
Kiel McLeod	6	2	1	3	-7	10
Phil Cole	5	1	2	3	-6	21
Ryan Wade	6	2	0	2	-2	4
Marc-Andre Bernier	6	1	1	2	-8	8
Derek Krestanovich	6	1	1	2	-2	4
Patrick Coulombe	6	0	2	2	-8	0
Seamus Young	6	0	2	2	-3	5
Daryl Lloyd	4	0	1	1	-1	9
Gustav Engman	1	0	0	0	-2	0
Robin Gomez	3	0	0	0	0	5
Paul Ballantyne	6	0	0	0	-3	4

=== Goaltenders ===
Note: GP = Games played; Min = Minutes played; W = Wins; L = Losses; OT = Overtime losses; SOL = Shootout losses; GA = Goals against; GAA= Goals against average; Sv% = Save percentage; SO= Shutouts

Regular season

Player	GP	Min	W	L	OT	SOL	GA	GAA	Sv%	SO
Julien Ellis	31	2190	21	14	1	1	117	3.21	.912	1
Bryan Bridges	33	1897	14	16	0	1	105	3.32	.905	0
Alexandre Vincent	2	92	1	0	0	0	6	3.93	.924	0
David Belitski	3	183	0	2	0	1	13	4.25	.865	0

Playoffs

Player	GP	Min	W	L	GA	GAA	Sv%	SO
Julien Ellis	4	213	1	3	15	4.23	.864	0
Bryan Bridges	4	147	1	1	12	4.91	.852	0

^{†}Denotes player spent time with another team before joining Victoria. Stats reflect time with the Salmon Kings only.
^{‡}Denotes player no longer with the team. Stats reflect time with Salmon Kings only.

== Transactions ==
=== Trades ===
October 30, 2006	To Victoria Salmon Kings Phil Cole	To Augusta Lynx Free Trade
November 28, 2006	To Victoria Salmon Kings Jordan Krestanovich; Derek Krestanovich	To Pensacola Ice Pilots David Wrigley; Adam Taylor
January 31, 2007	To Victoria Salmon Kings Paul Ballantyne	To Phoenix RoadRunners Greg Hornby
February 2, 2007	To Victoria Salmon Kings Free Trade	To Pensacola Ice Pilots Rich Meloche

=== Free agents acquired ===
Player	Former team
Wes Goldie	Sorel Mission (LNAH)
Warren McCutcheon	Manitoba Bisons (CWUAA)
Seamus Young	Trenton Titans
Mike Stutzel	Tappara Tampere (FNL)
Marc-Andre Bernier	Columbia Inferno
Matt Kelly	Belleville Bulls (OHL)
Darryl Lloyd	Youngstown Steelhounds (CHL)
Gustav Engman	Columbia Inferno
James DeMone	Columbia Inferno
Ryan Jorde	Fort Wayne Komets (UHL)
Patrick Coulombe	Chicoutimi Saguenéens (QMJHL)
Robin Gomez	Manchester Phoenix (EIHL)
Shaun Heshka	Everett Silvertips (WHL)
David Belitski	Heilbronn Falcons (GerObL)
Bryan Bridges	Reading Royals
Julien Ellis	Shawinigan Cataractes (QMJHL)
Alexandre Vincent	Val-d'Or Foreurs (QMJHL)
Justin Spencer	Colgate University (NCAA)
Brad Cook	Columbia Inferno
Adam Keefe	Toledo Storm

=== Free agents lost ===
Player	New team
Rob McVicar	Utah Grizzlies
B.J. Boxma	
Lanny Gare	Lausitzer Füchse (2.GBun)
Simon Mangos	Manchester Phoenix (EIHL)
Seth Leonard	Colorado Eagles (CHL)
Pat Sutton	Port Huron Flags (UHL)
Adam Huxley	Stockton Thunder

=== Players Released ===
Player	Date
David Belitski	October 31, 2006
Andy Zulyniak	December 21, 2006
Ryan Jorde	December 29, 2006
Joe Ricupero	January 6, 2007
Kenny Ruiz	January 8, 2007
Mike Katz	January 10, 2007
Jeff Barney	January 15, 2007
James DeMone*	January 20, 2007
Justin Spencer	January 26, 2007
Alexandre Vincent	April 3, 2007

*-Suspended by Team

== Professional affiliations ==
=== Vancouver Canucks ===
The Salmon Kings' NHL affiliate based in Vancouver, British Columbia.

=== Manitoba Moose ===
The Salmon Kings' AHL affiliate based in Winnipeg, Manitoba.
