= 2007–08 Victoria Salmon Kings season =

Sports season

2007-08 Victoria Salmon Kings
- West Division champions
- League: 7th ECHL
- Division: 1st West
- Conference: 2nd National
- 2007-08 record: 42-23-4-3
- Home record: 24-7-3-2
- Road record: 18-16-1-1
- Goals for: 256
- Goals against: 239

Team information
- General manager: Dan Belisle
- Coach: Mark Morrison
- Assistant coach: Quinten Van Horlick; Steve Lingren
- Captain: Kiel McLeod (Oct-Feb); Jordan Krestanovich
- Alternate captains: Jordan Krestanovich (Oct-Feb); Gary Gladue; Paul Ballantyne
- Arena: Save-On-Foods Memorial Centre
- Average attendance: 4,871

Team leaders
- Goals: Wes Goldie (42)
- Assists: Jordan Krestanovich (52)
- Points: Ash Goldie (83)
- Penalty minutes: Robin Gomez (142)
- Plus/minus: Kevin Estrada (+9)
- Wins: Julien Ellis (24)
- Goals against average: Julien Ellis (3.18)

The 2007–08 Victoria Salmon Kings season is the Salmon Kings' 4th season in the ECHL. The season saw the Salmon Kings establish themselves in the ECHL with a 91-point season, and winning 42 of 72 games. Before the start of the season, the Salmon Kings signed players Ash Goldie, Kevin Estrada, Gary Gladue, and goaltender Billy Thompson to complement their returning star players Wes Goldie, Milan Gajic, Kiel McLeod, and Ryan Wade. With their new additions and returning players the Salmon Kings became an elite team in the 2007-08 season, going 15-5-0-0 through their first 20 games and continued to earn wins going into the ECHL All-Star Game. At the 2008 All-Star Game festivities in Stockton, Ash Goldie showed his impressive skills during the two-day event. At the skills competition, Goldie became the first player in the ECHL to go 5 for 5 in the target shooting event. The following night at the All-Star Game, Goldie scored an All-Star record 6 points, recording 3 goals and 3 assists to earn All-Star M.V.P. honours. After the All-Star game, the Salmon Kings struggled after going through numerous injuries and call ups, but managed to narrowly win the National West division title, and took the number two seed into the Kelly Cup playoffs. In the playoffs, the Salmon Kings won their first-ever playoff round by eliminating the Bakersfield Condors in six games. Unfortunately in the second round, the Salmon Kings were eliminated from the playoffs by the Utah Grizzlies in five games. In their West Division title season, the Salmon Kings were led offensively by the Goldie brothers. Ash Goldie finished fourth in league scoring with 83 points, second in goals with 40, and first in power play goals with 20, while his brother, Wes led the league with 42 goals and 6 shorthanded goals.

== Standings ==
=== Division standings ===
West Division	GP	W	L	OTL	SOL	Pts	GF	GA
Victoria Salmon Kings (VAN)	72	42	23	4	3	91	256	239
Idaho Steelheads (DAL)	72	40	22	5	5	90	224	183
Alaska Aces (STL)	72	41	26	4	1	87	245	229
Utah Grizzlies (NYI)	72	32	30	2	8	74	239	259
Phoenix RoadRunners (SJ)	72	24	39	5	4	57	208	265

=== Conference standings ===
National Conference	GP	W	L	OTL	SOL	PTS	GF	GA
Las Vegas Wranglers (CGY) (y)	72	47	13	5	7	106	244	179
Victoria Salmon Kings (VAN) (y)	72	42	23	4	3	91	256	239
Fresno Falcons (Independent)	72	42	22	4	4	92	242	216
Idaho Steelheads (DAL)	72	40	22	5	5	90	224	183
Alaska Aces (STL)	72	41	26	4	1	87	245	229
Utah Grizzlies (NYI)	72	32	30	2	8	74	239	259
Bakersfield Condors (Independent)	72	26	37	2	7	61	230	280
Stockton Thunder (EDM)	72	27	40	3	2	59	200	250
Phoenix RoadRunners (SJ)	72	24	39	5	4	57	208	265

== Schedule and results ==
=== Regular season ===
2007–08 Game log

October: 3–2–0–0 (Home: 2–1–0–0; Road: 1–1–0–0)
#	Date	Visitor	Score	Home	OT	Decision	Attendance	Record	Pts
1	October 19	Victoria	2–1	Idaho	OT	Ellis	5,208	1–0–0–0	2
2	October 20	Victoria	2–4	Idaho		Thompson	4,030	1–1–0–0	2
3	October 26	Las Vegas	4–3	Victoria		Thompson	4,992	1–2–0–0	2
4	October 27	Las Vegas	3–4	Victoria		Thompson	3,675	2–2–0–0	4
5	October 31	Bakersfield	2–3	Victoria		Ellis	3,601	3–2–0–0	6

November: 11–3–0–0 (Home: 8–0–0–0; Road: 3–3–0–0)
#	Date	Visitor	Score	Home	OT	Decision	Attendance	Record	Pts
6	November 2	Bakersfield	4–7	Victoria		Ellis	3,757	4–2–0–0	8
7	November 3	Bakersfield	4–5	Victoria	SO	Thompson	3,911	5–2–0–0	10
8	November 9	Victoria	1–7	Utah		Ellis	3,908	5–3–0–0	10
9	November 10	Victoria	2–1	Utah		Ellis	3,602	6–3–0–0	12
10	November 12	Victoria	1–0	Utah		Ellis	2,326	7–3–0–0	14
11	November 14	Stockton	4–7	Victoria		Ellis	4,166	8–3–0–0	16
12	November 16	Stockton	3–4	Victoria		Thompson	4,152	9–3–0–0	18
13	November 17	Stockton	1–2	Victoria	OT	Thompson	4,415	10–3–0–0	20
14	November 21	Victoria	4–1	Idaho		Ellis	3,264	11–3–0–0	22
15	November 23	Victoria	1–5	Idaho		Thompson	4,029	11–4–0–0	22
16	November 24	Victoria	0–3	Idaho		Ellis	4,188	11–5–0–0	22
17	November 28	Phoenix	3–4	Victoria	OT	Ellis	4,205	12–5–0–0	24
18	November 29	Phoenix	3–4	Victoria	SO	Thompson	3,231	13–5–0–0	26
19	November 30	Phoenix	4–5	Victoria	OT	Ellis	5,810	14–5–0–0	28

December: 6–3–0–2 (Home: 1–0–0–2; Road: 5–3–0–0)
#	Date	Visitor	Score	Home	OT	Decision	Attendance	Record	Pts
20	December 6	Victoria	5–4	Phoenix	SO	Ellis	3,062	15–5–0–0	30
21	December 7	Victoria	2–3	Phoenix		Thompson	4,027	15–6–0–0	30
22	December 14	Victoria	2–5	Fresno		Thompson	4,546	15–7–0–0	30
23	December 15	Victoria	3–2	Bakersfield		Thompson	5,528	16–7–0–0	32
24	December 16	Victoria	7–3	Fresno		Thompson	4,416	17–7–0–0	34
25	December 19	Alaska	4–3	Victoria	SO	Ellis	5,560	17–7–0–1	35
26	December 21	Alaska	1–8	Victoria		Ellis	5,264	18–7–0–1	37
27	December 22	Alaska	4–3	Victoria	SO	Ellis	5,513	18–7–0–2	38
28	December 28	Victoria	5–3	Stockton		Ellis	6,886	19–7–0–2	40
29	December 29	Victoria	4–3	Fresno	SO	Ellis	4,719	20–7–0–2	42
30	December 30	Victoria	3–5	Fresno		Thompson	3,575	20–8–0–2	42

January: 7–3–3–0 (Home: 4–1–3–0; Road: 3–2–0–0)
#	Date	Visitor	Score	Home	OT	Decision	Attendance	Record	Pts
31	January 3	Utah	1–5	Victoria		Ellis	4,338	21–8–0–2	44
32	January 5	Utah	2–1	Victoria	OT	Ellis	5,458	21–8–1–2	45
33	January 6	Utah	3–2	Victoria	OT	Thompson	4,538	21–8–2–2	46
34	January 11	Victoria	0–5	Las Vegas		Ellis	4,510	21–9–2–2	46
35	January 12	Victoria	3–1	Las Vegas		Ellis	4,713	22–9–2–2	48
36	January 15	Bakersfield	5–1	Victoria		Ellis	5,673	22–10–2–2	48
37	January 16	Bakersfield	4–5	Victoria	OT	Thompson	5,802	23–10–2–2	50
38	January 18	Fresno	5–6	Victoria	SO	Ellis	4,913	24–10–2–2	52
39	January 19	Fresno	3–2	Victoria	OT	Thompson	5,417	24–10–3–2	53
40	January 20	Fresno	1–3	Victoria		Ellis	4,727	25–10–2–2	55
41	January 25	Victoria	0–2	Alaska		Ellis	4,518	25–11–3–2	55
42	January 26	Victoria	4–1	Alaska		Thompson	4,495	26–11–3–2	57
43	January 27	Victoria	7–5	Alaska		Ellis	4,458	27–11–3–2	59

February: 8–5–0–0 (Home: 4–3–0–0; Road: 4–2–0–0)
#	Date	Visitor	Score	Home	OT	Decision	Attendance	Record	Pts
44	February 5	Victoria	7–6	Bakersfield	SO	Thompson	4,144	28–11–3–2	61
45	February 7	Victoria	4–3	Stockton		Ellis	4,378	29–11–3–2	63
46	February 8	Victoria	5–7	Bakersfield		Ellis	6,331	29–12–3–2	63
47	February 11	Fresno	3–2	Victoria		Ellis	4,556	29–13–3–2	63
48	February 12	Fresno	5–6	Victoria	OT	Thompson	4,291	30–13–3–2	65
49	February 15	Victoria	3–2	Las Vegas		Ellis	5,299	31–13–3–2	67
50	February 16	Victoria	3–5	Las Vegas		Thompson	5,671	31–14–3–2	67
51	February 18	Victoria	6–4	Phoenix		Thompson	2,629	32–14–3–2	69
52	February 20	Idaho	3–2	Victoria		Thompson	4,553	32–15–3–2	69
53	February 22	Idaho	0–6	Victoria		Ellis	5,456	33–15–3–2	71
54	February 23	Idaho	4–2	Victoria		Ellis	5,075	33–16–3–2	71
55	February 27	Las Vegas	3–5	Victoria		Thompson	4,197	34–16–3–2	73
56	February 29	Las Vegas	4–5	Victoria	OT	Ellis	4,802	35–16–3–2	75

March: 5–4–1–1 (Home: 3–1–0–0; Road: 2–4–1–1)
#	Date	Visitor	Score	Home	OT	Decision	Attendance	Record	Pts
57	March 1	Las Vegas	5–4	Victoria		Thompson	5,471	35–17–3–2	75
58	March 7	Victoria	2–3	Alaska		Thompson	4,562	35–18–3–2	75
59	March 8	Victoria	3–4	Alaska		Ellis	5,334	35–19–3–2	75
60	March 9	Victoria	4–3	Alaska		Ellis	4,665	36–19–3–2	77
61	March 14	Victoria	1–5	Phoenix		Ellis	4,402	36–20–3–2	77
62	March 16	Victoria	1–6	Phoenix		Thompson	3,624	36–21–3–2	77
63	March 19	Utah	3–7	Victoria		Ellis	5,560	37–21–3–2	79
64	March 21	Utah	0–4	Victoria		Thompson	4,472	38–21–3–2	81
65	March 22	Utah	2–3	Victoria	SO	Ellis	5,263	39–21–3–2	83
66	March 26	Victoria	7–6	Stockton		Ellis	5,836	40–21–3–2	85
67	March 28	Victoria	3–6	Bakersfield		Thompson	7,513	40–22–3–2	85
68	March 29	Victoria	2–3	Stockton	SO	Ellis	9,737	40–22–3–3	86
69	March 30	Victoria	4–5	Fresno	OT	Ellis	3,971	40–22–4–3	87

April: 2–1–0–0 (Home: 2–1–0–0; Road: 0–0–0–0)
#	Date	Visitor	Score	Home	OT	Decision	Attendance	Record	Pts
70	April 2	Alaska	6–4	Victoria		Ellis	5,056	40–23–4–3	87
71	April 4	Alaska	0–2	Victoria		Thompson	6,478	41–23–4–3	89
72	April 5	Alaska	1–4	Victoria		Thompson	7,006	42–23–4–3	91

Legend: Win (2 points) Loss (0 points) Overtime/shootout loss (1 point)

=== Playoffs ===
2008 Kelly Cup playoffs

National Conference quarter-final vs. (7) Bakersfield Condors: Victoria won series 4–2
#	Date	Visitor	Score	Home	OT	Decision	Attendance	Series
1	April 10	Bakersfield	2–1	Victoria	OT	Thompson	5,008	0–1
2	April 12	Bakersfield	3–4	Victoria		Thompson	6,448	1–1
3	April 15	Victoria	3–2	Bakersfield	OT	Thompson	5,197	2–1
4	April 16	Victoria	4–1	Bakersfield		Thompson	4,815	3–1
5	April 19	Victoria	4–5	Bakersfield		Thompson	5,090	3–2
6	April 22	Bakersfield	5–6	Victoria	OT	Thompson	6,701	4–2

National Conference semi-final vs. (6) Utah Grizzlies: Utah won series 4–1
#	Date	Visitor	Score	Home	OT	Decision	Attendance	Series
1	April 25	Utah	6–0	Victoria		Thompson	5,685	0–1
2	April 27	Utah	1–6	Victoria		Ellis	5,413	1–1
3	May 1	Victoria	5–7	Utah		Ellis	2,321	1–2
4	May 3	Victoria	0–2	Utah		Thompson	4,308	1–3
5	May 4	Victoria	3–8	Utah		Thompson	2,973	1–4

Legend: Win Loss

== Player stats ==
=== Skaters ===
Note: GP = Games played; G = Goals; A = Assists; Pts = Points; +/- = Plus/minus; PIM = Penalty minutes

Regular season

Player	GP	G	A	Pts	+/-	PIM
Ash Goldie	70	40	43	83	-2	24
Jordan Krestanovich	70	13	52	65	-19	20
Wes Goldie	72	42	19	61	-8	66
Marc-Andre Bernier	59	21	27	48	+4	32
Kevin Estrada	59	18	30	48	+9	45
Ryan Wade	70	11	33	44	-16	90
Gary Gladue	71	5	37	42	-11	48
Milan Gajic	35	15	25	40	-8	14
Kiel McLeod	48	15	20	35	-24	117
Chris St. Jacques ^{†}	51	11	23	34	4	34
Patrick Coulombe	58	8	22	30	-1	40
Dylan Yeo	55	10	18	28	+4	76
Daryl Lloyd	52	10	16	26	-5	128
Matt Kelly	54	7	16	23	-3	59
Paul Ballantyne	52	6	16	22	-5	42
Derek Krestanovich	57	8	8	16	+1	57
Nathan Barrett ^{‡}	13	3	10	13	-6	4
Jacob Dietrich	9	2	3	5	-1	0
Daniel Rahimi	19	0	5	5	-2	14
Darren Deschamps	42	0	4	4	-8	39
Simon Lambert	6	0	3	3	+4	2
Brady Levold	3	2	0	2	+2	2
Robin Gomez	38	1	1	2	-10	142
Trevor Blanchard	7	1	0	1	-1	16
Brad Zanon	14	0	1	1	0	19
Bryan Nathe ^{†‡}	15	0	1	1	-2	4
Ty Morris	1	0	0	0	0	2
Alex Lalonde	1	0	0	0	+1	0
Jonathan Labelle	2	0	0	0	-3	2
Eric Nelson ^{†}	3	0	0	0	-1	6
Kalvin Sagert	4	0	0	0	0	0
Chris Shaw	15	0	0	0	-1	13

Playoffs

Player	GP	G	A	Pts	+/-	PIM
Wes Goldie	11	5	6	11	+3	4
Ash Goldie	11	4	6	10	-2	8
Ryan Wade	11	5	4	9	+5	16
Dylan Yeo	11	4	3	7	-3	18
Marc-Andre Bernier	11	6	0	6	-2	6
Chris St. Jacques	11	2	3	5	-3	22
Patrick Coulombe	11	0	5	5	-3	4
Kiel McLeod	3	2	2	4	0	10
Jacob Dietrich	8	2	2	4	-2	2
Kevin Estrada	10	1	3	4	-6	21
Daryl Lloyd	11	1	2	3	0	12
Paul Ballantyne	10	2	0	2	+2	8
Brad Zanon	10	0	2	2	+4	4
Brady Leavold	2	0	1	1	+1	2
Darren Deschamps	5	0	1	1	+2	0
Jordan Krestanovich	5	0	1	1	0	2
Derek Krestanovich	7	0	1	1	-1	2
Gary Gladue	8	0	1	1	-1	2

=== Goaltenders ===
Note: GP = Games played; TOI = Time on ice (minutes); W = Wins; L = Losses; OT = Overtime losses; SOL = Shootout losses; GA = Goals against; GAA= Goals against average; Sv% = Save percentage; SO= Shutouts

Regular season

Player	GP	TOI	W	L	OT	SOL	GA	GAA	Sv%	SO
Julien Ellis	42	2412	24	11	2	3	128	3.18	.908	2
Billy Thompson	34	1897	18	12	2	0	106	3.24	.907	2

Playoffs

Player	GP	TOI	W	L	GA	GAA	Sv%	SO
Billy Thompson	9	534	4	5	31	3.48	.881	0
Julien Ellis	3	136	1	1	9	3.97	.857	0

^{†}Denotes player spent time with another team before joining Victoria. Stats reflect time with the Salmon Kings only.
^{‡}Denotes player no longer with the team. Stats reflect time with Salmon Kings only.

== Transactions ==
=== Trades ===
June 15, 2007	To Victoria Salmon Kings Free Trade	To Augusta Lynx Warren McCutcheon
December 6, 2007	To Victoria Salmon Kings Free Trade	To Phoenix RoadRunners Bryan Nathe

=== Free agents acquired ===
Player	Former team
Ash Goldie	Long Beach Ice Dogs
Kevin Estrada	Florida Everblades
Gary Gladue	Long Beach Ice Dogs
Ty Morris	Peiting EC (GerObL)
Alex Lalonde	Calgary Dinos (CWUAA)
Chris Shaw	Huntsville Havoc (SPHL)
Billy Thompson	Bridgeport Sound Tigers (AHL)
Kalvin Sagert	Prince George Cougars (WHL)
Jonathan Labelle	Brock Badgers (CIS)
Darren Deschamps	Lethbridge Pronghorns (CWUAA)
Dylan Yeo	Calgary Hitmen (WHL)
Daniel Rahimi	IF Björklöven (SEL-1)
Brad Zanon	UBC Thunderbirds (CWUAA)
Trevor Blanchard	Concordia Stingers (CIS)
Nathan Barrett	Visp (Swiss-B)
Jacob Dietrich	Portland Winterhawks (WHL)

=== Free agents lost ===
Player	New team
Francois-Pierre Guenette	Alaska Aces
Mike Stutzel	Edinburgh Capitals (EIHL)
Steve Lingren	Retired
Seamus Young	Wheeling Nailers
Gustav Engman	Nybro Vikings (SEL-1)
Phil Cole	Stockton Thunder
Bryan Bridges	Colorado Eagles (CHL)

=== Released Players Pickup ===
Player	From
Eric Nelson	Utah Grizzlies
Bryan Nathe	Johnstown Chiefs
Chris St. Jacques	Stockton Thunder

=== Players Released ===
Player	Date
Ty Morris*	October 30, 2007
Eric Nelson	November 27, 2007
Alex Lalonde	December 6, 2007
Ryan Lowe	December 18, 2007
Nathan Barrett	February 23, 2008
Chris Shaw	February 29, 2008
Trevor Blanchard	March 24, 2008
Robin Gomez	March 28, 2008
Jonathan Labelle	April 6, 2008
Kalvin Sagert	April 27, 2008

*-Suspended by Team

== Professional affiliations ==
=== Vancouver Canucks ===
The Salmon Kings' NHL affiliate based in Vancouver, British Columbia.

=== Manitoba Moose ===
The Salmon Kings' AHL affiliate based in Winnipeg, Manitoba.
