= Matthew Kelly (disambiguation) =

Matthew Kelly (born 1950) is an English actor and television presenter.

Matthew Kelly or Matt Kelly may also refer to:

== Real persons ==
- Matthew Kelly (historian) (1814–1858), Irish Roman Catholic priest, academic and antiquary
- Matthew Kelly (footballer) (born 1971), former Australian rules footballer
- Matthew Kelly (speaker) (born 1973), Australian international speaker and business consultant
- Matt Kelley (born 1978), Korean-American writer
- Matthew Kelly (cricketer) (born 1994), Australian cricketer
- Matt Kelly (ice hockey), see 2007–08 Victoria Salmon Kings season
- Matthew Kelly (The Autumns), American vocalist and guitarist associated with the Autumns and the Sound of Animals Fighting
- Matthew Kelly (musician), American musician, singer, and songwriter for Kingfish and RatDog
- Matt Kelly of Bully Records
- Matt Kelly (drummer), for Dropkick Murphys

== Fictional characters ==
- Matt Kelly, character in Alaska Seas
