= Jacob Dietrich =

American politician

Jacob Dietrich (August 22, 1857 – February 6, 1932) was an American merchant and politician.

Born in Green Bay, Wisconsin, Dietrich moved with his parents to Cedarburg, Wisconsin. From 1882 to 1887, Dietrich lived in Bismarck, Dakota Territory where he was in the general store business. He then returned to Cedarburg, Wisconsin and was in the banking and real estate business. He was also secretary of the Ozaukee County Agricultural Society. Dietrich served on the Ozaukee County Board of Supervisors and was a Democrat. In 1913, Dietrich served in the Wisconsin State Assembly.
