= Josh Garbutt =

Canadian ice hockey player

- Born: July 18, 1984 (age 41) Medicine Hat, Alberta, Canada
- Height: 5 ft 10 in (178 cm)
- Weight: 205 lb (93 kg; 14 st 9 lb)
- Position: Defence
- Shot: Left
- Played for: Victoria Salmon Kings; New Mexico Scorpions; Tulsa Oilers; Rio Grande Valley Killer Bees; Manchester Phoenix
- Playing career: 2005–2009

Josh Garbutt (born July 18, 1984) is a Canadian former professional ice hockey player, he retired after being released by the Manchester Phoenix of the EIHL due to financial problems. He began his career as a forward but switched to play in the defence.

== Playing career ==
Born in Medicine Hat, Alberta, Garbutt began his career in 2001 at junior level in the WHL playing for the Brandon Wheat Kings. In his debut season for the Wheat Kings, Garbutt featured in 52 regular season games, scoring 19 points and totalling 33 penalty minutes. This helped the Wheat Kings into the post-season where they lost in the Eastern Conference final. Garbutt continued with the Wheat Kings, and continued to be an important player for the organisation, who again managed to get to the Eastern Conference final but again were eliminated. Garbutt featured in 17 post-season games during the 2002–03 season.

In his final season in Brandon, Garbutt played in 38 games before moving mid-season to the Kamloops Blazers. Garbutt again played in the WHL post-season, although the Blazers were eliminated quickly in the Conference quarter final. Garbutt started the following season with the Prince George Cougars, but moved after just 12 games to the Yorkton Terriers of the Saskatchewan Junior Hockey League. In 40 SJHL games, Garbutt totalled an impressive 38 points. Garbutt has twice attended NHL development camps, for the Washington Capitals and the Anaheim Ducks but has not been drafted.

Garbutt's senior career began though a call-up by the Victoria Salmon Kings to the ECHL, generally regarded as the third tier of ice hockey in North America. Garbutt featured in just 7 games though before playing for the University of Regina in Saskatchewan at CIS level. While in the CIS, Garbutt managed an impressive point-per-game ratio. Garbutt split the 2006–07 season between the New Mexico Scorpions and the Tulsa Oilers, both of whom play in the Central Hockey League.

He continued with the Oilers for the 2007–08 season, but after 27 games and 15 points moved to the Rio Grande Valley Killer Bees. Garbutt featured in 29 games, scoring 11 points and totalling 18 penalty minutes. In the summer of 2008, Garbutt moved to play for the Manchester Phoenix of the EIHL for his first taste of European hockey. Garbutt firmly established himself as a cornerstone of the Phoenix defence during his season in Manchester, and also managed to total 45 points in just 66 games, an impressive total for a defenceman. Garbutt's play helped the Phoenix to both domestic cup finals as well as into the post-season. Despite on-ice success, financial problems befell the organisation and in the summer of 2009, the Phoenix announced they would operate in the EPL. As a direct consequence, much of the senior squad was released, including Garbutt.

In his time away from the hockey rink, Garbutt helps out on the family farm and works as a buffalo rancher.

== Career statistics ==
			Regular season					Playoffs
Season	Team	League	GP	G	A	Pts	PIM	GP	G	A	Pts	PIM
2001–02	Brandon Wheat Kings	WHL	52	6	13	19	33	12	0	0	0	4
2002–03	Brandon Wheat Kings	WHL	67	12	29	41	78	17	1	3	4	19
2003–04	Brandon Wheat Kings	WHL	38	6	15	21	22	—	—	—	—	—
2003–04	Kamloops Blazers	WHL	27	2	6	8	33	5	0	0	0	6
2004–05	Prince George Cougars	WHL	12	3	0	3	20	—	—	—	—	—
2004–05	Yorkton Terriers	SJHL	40	10	28	38	70	—	—	—	—	—
2005–06	Victoria Salmon Kings	ECHL	7	1	0	1	2	—	—	—	—	—
2005–06	University of Regina	CIS	31	11	20	31	56	—	—	—	—	—
2006–07	New Mexico Scorpions	CHL	31	5	12	17	18	—	—	—	—	—
2006–07	Tulsa Oilers	CHL	10	2	2	4	8	—	—	—	—	—
2007–08	Tulsa Oilers	CHL	27	4	11	15	36	—	—	—	—	—
2007–08	Rio Grande Valley Killer Bees	CHL	29	3	8	11	18	—	—	—	—	—
2008–09	Manchester Phoenix	EIHL	52	4	28	32	49	2	1	2	3	2
EIHL totals			52	4	28	32	49	2	1	2	3	2
