= Kiel McLeod =

Canadian ice hockey player (born 1982)

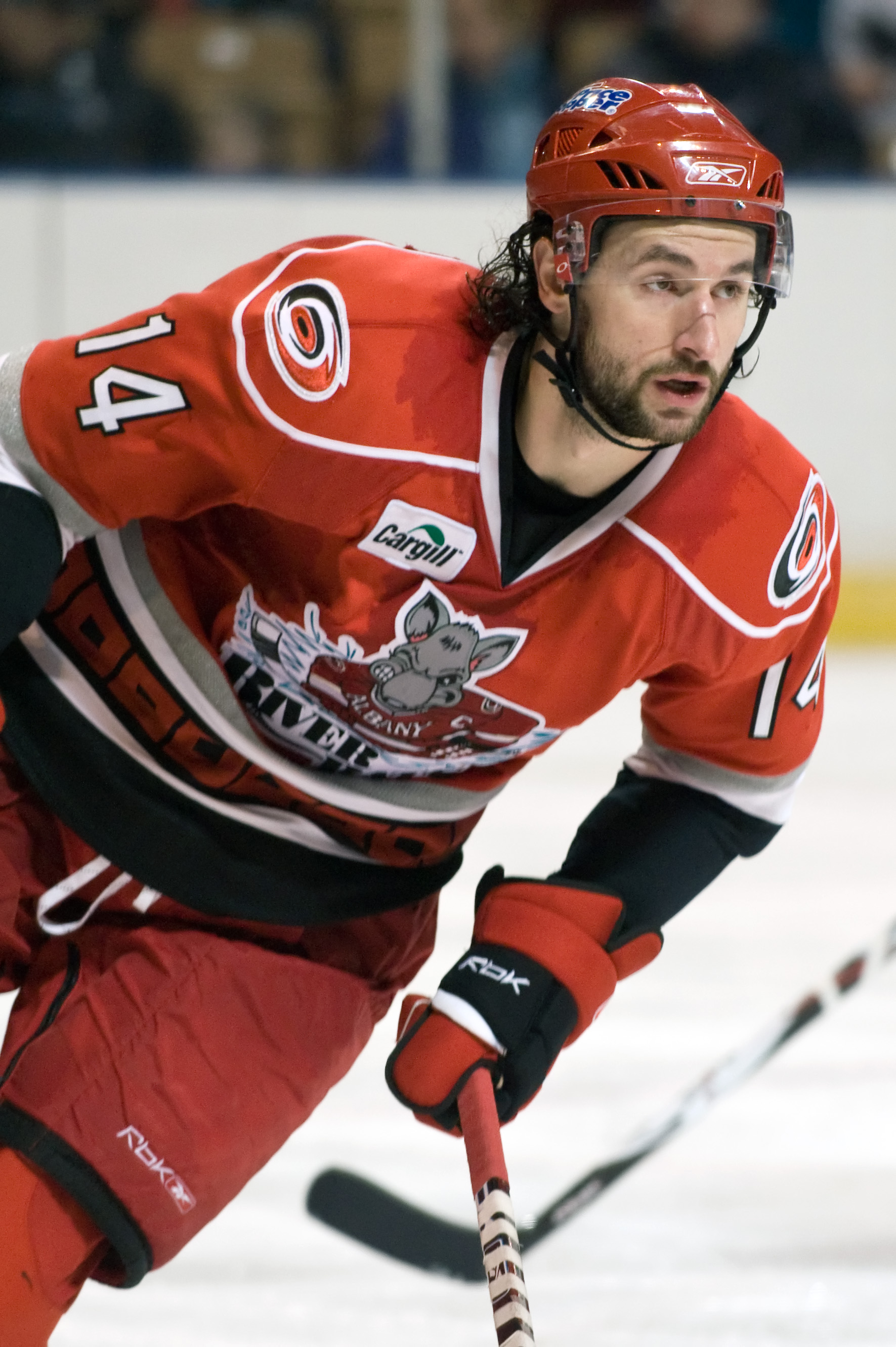
- McLeod with the Albany River Rats in 2008
- Born: December 30, 1982 (age 43) Kelowna, British Columbia, Canada
- Height: 6 ft 6 in (198 cm)
- Weight: 235 lb (107 kg; 16 st 11 lb)
- Position: Centre
- Shot: Right
- Played for: Springfield Falcons; Utah Grizzlies; San Antonio Rampage; Philadelphia Phantoms; Albany River Rats; SG Cortina; EC VSV; EV Ravensburg; Frisk Asker Ishockey; HC Pustertal Wölfe
- NHL draft: 53rd overall, 2001; Columbus Blue Jackets
- Playing career: 2003–2014

Kiel McLeod (born December 30, 1982) is a Canadian former professional ice hockey centre. He most recently played for HC Pustertal Wölfe in the Italian Serie A. He joined the Wolves after a stints with EV Ravensburg of the 2nd Bundesliga and Frisk Asker of the GET-ligaen. He retired after the 2013-2014 season.

== Playing career ==
McLeod played his entire major junior hockey career in his hometown for the Kelowna Rockets. He was drafted in the second round, 53rd overall, in 2001 by the Columbus Blue Jackets. Upon signing an entry-level contract with the Blue Jackets, he was sent to the minors to develop his play in the American Hockey League however never received a recall before he was traded to the Phoenix Coyotes.

On December 28, 2005, McLeod was traded by the Coyotes to the Philadelphia Flyers in exchange for Eric Chouinard, and was immediately assigned to remain in the AHL with the Philadelphia Phantoms. Throughout his professional playing career, McLeod has played for ten teams, in five leagues, and in five countries.

== Career statistics ==
			Regular season					Playoffs
Season	Team	League	GP	G	A	Pts	PIM	GP	G	A	Pts	PIM
1997–98	Kelowna Rockets	WHL	2	0	0	0	0	—	—	—	—	—
1998–99	Kelowna Rockets	WHL	55	12	15	27	48	6	0	1	1	2
1999–2000	Kelowna Rockets	WHL	59	17	13	30	100	5	2	1	3	2
2000–01	Kelowna Rockets	WHL	65	38	28	66	94	4	4	1	5	8
2001–02	Kelowna Rockets	WHL	41	17	31	48	62	15	3	10	13	14
2002–03	Kelowna Rockets	WHL	68	39	51	90	163	8	5	5	10	4
2003–04	Springfield Falcons	AHL	77	7	11	18	71	—	—	—	—	—
2004–05	Utah Grizzlies	AHL	73	13	12	25	107	—	—	—	—	—
2005–06	San Antonio Rampage	AHL	28	0	1	1	33	—	—	—	—	—
2005–06	Philadelphia Phantoms	AHL	34	2	2	4	36	—	—	—	—	—
2005–06	Trenton Titans	ECHL	8	5	4	9	15	2	0	1	1	2
2006–07	Victoria Salmon Kings	ECHL	65	32	31	63	116	6	2	1	3	10
2007–08	Victoria Salmon Kings	ECHL	48	15	20	35	117	3	2	2	4	10
2007–08	Albany River Rats	AHL	20	5	8	13	20	7	2	1	3	11
2008–09	SG Cortina	ITA	37	28	22	50	129	4	1	0	1	10
2009–10	EC VSV	AUT	51	22	19	41	170	5	0	1	1	8
2010–11	Victoria Salmon Kings	ECHL	40	9	16	25	83	12	3	3	6	12
2011–12	EV Ravensburg	GER.2	26	18	13	31	63	11	5	4	9	26
2012–13	Frisk Asker	NOR	31	8	13	21	136	5	0	0	0	4
2013–14	HC Pustertal Wölfe	ITA	27	10	9	19	54	14	1	3	4	10
AHL totals			232	27	34	61	267	7	2	1	3	11
ECHL totals			161	61	71	132	331	23	7	7	14	34

== Awards and honours ==
Award	Year
WHL
West Second All-Star Team	2003

Sporting positions
Preceded by Ryan Wade	Victoria Salmon Kings team captain 2006 – 2008	Succeeded by Jordan Krestanovich
