= Lanny Gare =

Canadian-German ice hockey player

- Born: September 5, 1978 (age 47) Vernon, British Columbia, Canada
- Height: 6 ft 1 in (185 cm)
- Weight: 195 lb (88 kg; 13 st 13 lb)
- Position: Centre
- Shoots: Left
- Germany3 team Former teams: Löwen Frankfurt; AHL; Hamilton Bulldogs; UHL; Quad City Mallards; ECHL; Dayton Bombers; Fresno Falcons; Victoria Salmon Kings
- Playing career: 2003–present

Lanny Gare (born September 5, 1978) is a Canadian-born German professional ice hockey centre. He is currently playing in the German lower leagues with Löwen Frankfurt.

He is the nephew of former National Hockey League winger Danny Gare.

== Awards and honours ==
Award	Year
All-Hockey East First Team	2002–03
AHCA East Second-Team All-American	2002–03
