= Steve Lingren =

Canadian ice hockey player and coach

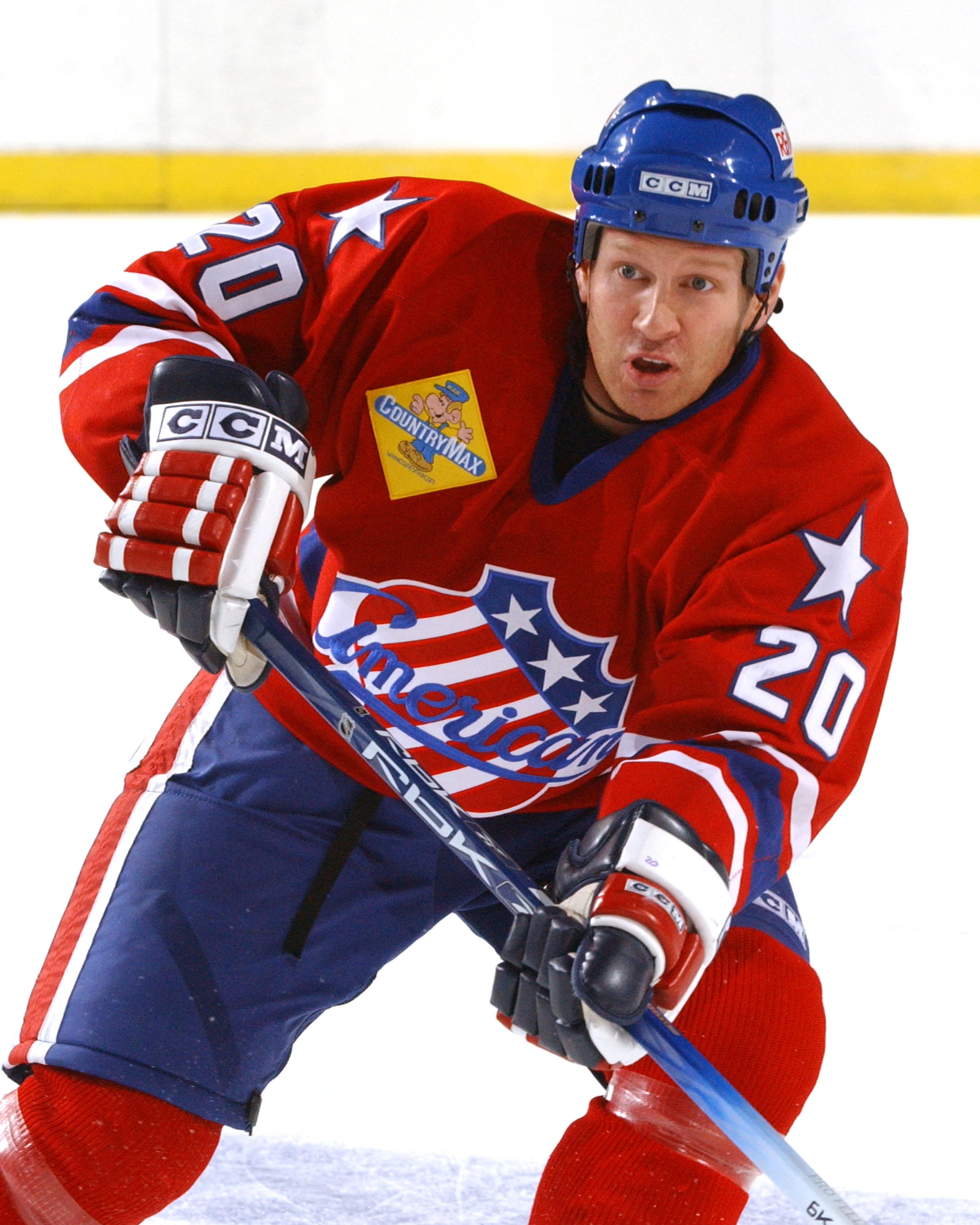
- Lingren with the Rochester Americans in 2004
- Born: April 15, 1973 (age 51); Lake Cowichan, British Columbia, Canada
- Height: 6 ft 0 in (183 cm)
- Weight: 185 lb (84 kg; 13 st 3 lb)
- Position: Defence
- Shot: Left
- Played for: AHL; Cornwall Aces; Hershey Bears; Kentucky Thoroughblades; Milwaukee Admirals; Rochester Americans; DEL; ERC Ingolstadt; ECHL; Dayton Bombers; Victoria Salmon Kings; IHL; Kalamazoo Wings; Kansas City Blades; Michigan K-Wings
- Playing career: 1994–2007

Steve Lingren (born April 15, 1973) is a Canadian retired professional ice hockey defenceman and coach who is served as an assistant coach with the Victoria Salmon Kings of the ECHL.

== Career statistics ==
			Regular season					Playoffs
Season	Team	League	GP	G	A	Pts	PIM	GP	G	A	Pts	PIM
1991–92	Victoria Cougars	WHL	70	4	14	18	103	—	—	—	—	—
1992–93	Victoria Cougars	WHL	72	10	43	53	148	—	—	—	—	—
1993–94	Victoria Cougars	WHL	58	14	21	35	118	—	—	—	—	—
1993–94	Kalamazoo Wings	IHL	2	0	0	0	0	—	—	—	—	—
1994–95	Dayton Bombers	ECHL	64	11	23	34	128	9	2	8	10	16
1994–95	Kalamazoo Wings	IHL	4	0	0	0	0	—	—	—	—	—
1995–96	Dayton Bombers	ECHL	51	15	28	43	83	—	—	—	—	—
1995–96	Michigan K-Wings	IHL	2	0	0	0	2	—	—	—	—	—
1995–96	Cornwall Aces	AHL	1	0	0	0	0	—	—	—	—	—
1996–97	Dayton Bombers	ECHL	9	2	5	7	15	—	—	—	—	—
1996–97	Hershey Bears	AHL	40	3	10	13	67	12	1	2	3	8
1997–98	Hershey Bears	AHL	63	12	18	30	89	7	0	3	3	4
1998–99	Kentucky Thoroughblades	AHL	74	11	19	30	60	12	0	4	4	0
1999–00	Kansas City Blades	IHL	75	10	15	25	54	—	—	—	—	—
2000–01	Kansas City Blades	IHL	66	5	14	19	50	—	—	—	—	—
2001–02	ERC Ingolstadt	Germany2	41	9	6	15	78	10	3	6	9	27
2002–03	ERC Ingolstadt	DEL	33	2	8	10	38	—	—	—	—	—
2003–04	Rochester Americans	AHL	69	4	13	17	127	16	3	1	4	10
2004–05	Rochester Americans	AHL	52	1	4	5	74	2	0	0	0	0
2005–06	Milwaukee Admirals	AHL	8	0	5	5	0	20	2	4	6	10
2005–06	Victoria Salmon Kings	ECHL	62	22	25	47	77	—	—	—	—	—
2006–07	Victoria Salmon Kings	ECHL	62	7	27	34	61	6	2	5	7	2
AHL totals			307	31	69	100	417	69	6	14	20	32
ECHL totals			248	57	108	165	364	15	4	13	17	18
