= Phoenix Roadrunners (ECHL) =

Defunct minor professional ice hockey team

- City: Phoenix, Arizona
- League: ECHL
- Conference: National
- Division: West
- Operated: 2005–2009
- Home arena: US Airways Center
- Colors: Carolina blue, black, sunflower gold, white
- Owners: Legacy Partners, LLC. (headed by Robert Sarver)
- Head coach: Brad Church
- Media: Arizona Republic; East Valley Tribune
- Affiliates: Phoenix Coyotes (NHL); San Jose Sharks (NHL); San Antonio Rampage (AHL); Worcester Sharks (AHL)

Franchise history
- 2005–2009: Phoenix Roadrunners

The Phoenix Roadrunners were a minor league ice hockey team based in Phoenix, Arizona. They played in the ECHL from the 2005–06 season until the end of the 2008–09 season when they ceased operations.

== History ==
Barry Kemp, the majority owner of the Long Beach Ice Dogs, was awarded an ECHL expansion franchise to play in Ontario, California. In 2004, Kemp partnered with Rick Adams, David LeFevre, John Butler, and Mike Nelson to create Bloomington Partners and transferred the Ontario ECHL franchise rights to Bloomington, Illinois, with the intention to begin play in the 2005–06 season. After an apparent fallout among the Bloomington Partners, the city voided its contract with the ownership group for the arena. The ECHL franchise was sold to Legacy Partners, LLC, headed by Phoenix Suns' majority owner Robert Sarver and the franchise was relocated to Phoenix. Former Phoenix Coyotes star Claude Lemieux was named as the club's first president.

In 2005, after four years without a minor league hockey team following the demise of the Phoenix Mustangs, the Phoenix Roadrunners' name was revived. In their first season, 2005–06, the Roadrunners began the season well but dropped throughout the year because of injuries and finished with the league's worst record.

In the off-season of 2006–07, the Roadrunners cemented an affiliation deal with the Phoenix Coyotes of the National Hockey League. The Roadrunners once again started very well, staying above .500 for the beginning of the year. The team climbed up the National Division, topping out at fifth place. However, after several mid-season trades, the team ended up with a 27–40 record. Furthermore, with eight games left in the regular season, head coach Ron Filion and general manager Ray Delia resigned, Filion being replaced by assistant coach Brad Church. The Roadrunners still qualified for their first trip to the Kelly Cup playoffs. However, in the first round the team was swept 4–0 by their rivals, the Las Vegas Wranglers.

After the season ended, the Roadrunners decided to keep Church as head coach. In the front office, Claude Lemieux chose to resign as president, but stated that he would continue to act as a consultant to the team.

The Phoenix Coyotes chose not to renew their affiliation agreement for the 2007–08 season and instead went with the other minor league hockey team in Arizona, the Arizona Sundogs of the Central Hockey League. The Roadrunners then signed a two-year affiliation agreement with the San Jose Sharks and its American Hockey League affiliate, the Worcester Sharks on October 19, 2007.

The 2007–08 season started off well for the Roadrunners, with a sweep of their three-game series against the Utah Grizzlies. However, by November, the team was only able to win three of their thirteen scheduled games, taking the team lower into the standings. In December, the team went 4–7, although the team was finally able to muster a win against the Wranglers in their annual Midnight game. Despite the team's struggles, both Peder Skinner and Brian Yandle were named to the All-Star Team. By the end of the season, the Roadrunners fell short of making the playoffs and finished with a record of 24 wins, 39 losses, five overtime losses, four shoot-out losses, and 57 points. The team finished in fifth place in West Division.

The fourth and final season, 2008–09, started with the Roadrunners facing off against their rivals the Victoria Salmon Kings, with the three game series going two-of-three to the Runners. October ended with the team going 3-2-1 giving the team seven of a possible twelve points on the month. November ended with the team going 5-8-1, giving them 11 of a possible 28 points, bringing the team to fourth in their division. In December the team rallied around the outstanding goaltending of Craig Kowalski and won two consecutive contests at home against the team's rival Las Vegas Wranglers. The two game performance by Kowalski earned him the ECHL Goalie of the Week award, becoming the first Roadrunners Goalie since Cody Rudkowsky in 2006 to win the award. The team also saw Mike Fornataro and Michael Wilson go to the ECHL All-Star Game in January. The team finished the month going 4-6-0 and gave the team eight of a possible 20 points, and staying at fourth in their division. The team finished January with a 5-6-0 record, winning 10 of a possible 22 points. However, a series near the end of the season against the Alaska Aces did not go well, as they were outscored 18-5 throughout the series, and were swept, dashing the Roadrunners' playoff hopes.

The team then ceased operations after the 2008–09 season.

== Season-by-season record ==
| Season | GP | W | L | T | OTL | SOL | Pts | Standing | Playoffs |
|---|---|---|---|---|---|---|---|---|---|
| 2005–06 | 72 | 20 | 47 | 5 | — | — | 45 | 6th of 6, West Div. | Did not qualify |
| 2006–07 | 72 | 27 | 40 | — | 2 | 3 | 59 | 4th of 5, West Div. | Lost in Conference quarterfinals, 0–4 vs. Las Vegas |
| 2007–08 | 72 | 24 | 39 | — | 5 | 4 | 57 | 5th of 5, West Div. | Did not qualify |
| 2008–09 | 72 | 30 | 37 | — | 2 | 3 | 65 | 5th of 5, West Div. | Did not qualify |

== Head coaches ==
- Ron Filion (2005–2006)
- Brad Church (2006–2009)

== Team records ==
=== Season records ===
Game Played: 72 TIE- Dean Tiltgen (2005–06), Peder Skinner (2007–08)
Goals: 27 TIE- Justin Aikins (2006–07), Sean O'Connor (2007–08)
Assists: 42- Daniel Sisca (2007–08)
Points: 60 Daniel Sisca (2007–08)
Best +- (Min. 40 games): +4 - Brent Henley (2005–06)
Penalty Minutes: 271- Brent Henley (2005–06)
Wins: 17- Craig Kowalski (2008-09)
GAA (Min. 15 games): 2.34- Taylor Dakers (2007–08)
SV % (Min. 15 games): .930- Taylor Dakers (2007–08)
Shutouts: 2- Mike Mole (2005–06)

=== Career records ===
Game Played: 142- Mitch Carefoot
Goals: 32- Daniel Sisca
Assists: 73- Daniel Sisca
Points: 105- Daniel Sisca
Penalty Minutes: 271- Brent Henley
Wins: 19- Cody Rudkowsky
GAA (Min. 15 games): 2.34- Taylor Dakers
SV % (Min. 15 games): .930- Taylor Dakers
Shutouts: 2- Mike Mole, Cody Rudkowsky

== Retired numbers ==
- #3 Adam Keller WHL RoadRunners defenceman, former RoadRunners player and general manager
- #4 Sandy Hucul WHL RoadRunners defenceman, former RoadRunners player and head coach
- #8 Robbie Ftorek WHA RoadRunners forward, member of United States Hockey Hall of Fame

== NHL alumni ==
List of Phoenix Roadrunners alumni who played over 25 games in the ECHL and 25 or more games in the National Hockey League.

- Garrett Burnett
- Kimbi Daniels
- Mike Morrison

== Rocky Roadrunner ==
Rocky Roadrunner is the mascot of the Roadrunners. Rocky, who has been with the team for decades, is a mainstay from the early years in the desert. His service dates back all the way to 1967. The ECHL team brought a major change of the entire costume, most notably the skin, which turned a bright yellow compared to a shade of brown in previous years. Furthermore, rather than continuing the more lifelike version of previous years, the ECHL's version chose to make a more cartoonish version of Rocky. The 2007–08 ECHL season coincided with Rocky's 40th year of service, which was by far the oldest mascot in the history of any pro sports team in Arizona.
