= Danny Belisle =

Canadian ice hockey player and coach (1937–2022)

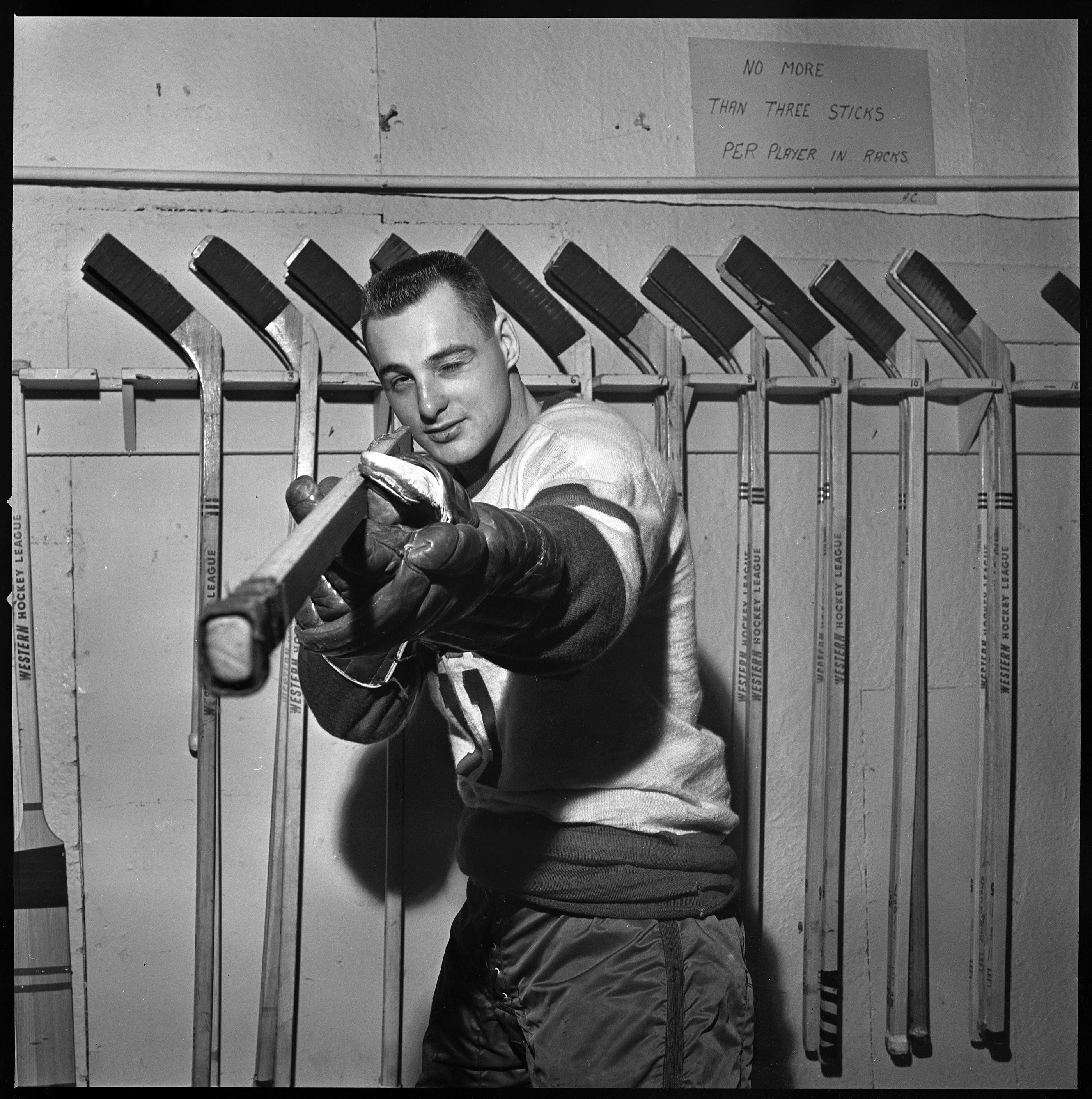
- Belisle with the Vancouver Canucks in 1961
- Born: May 9, 1937 South Porcupine, Ontario, Canada
- Died: November 28, 2022 (aged 85)
- Height: 5 ft 10 in (178 cm)
- Weight: 165 lb (75 kg; 11 st 11 lb)
- Position: Right wing
- Shot: Right
- Played for: New York Rangers
- Playing career: 1957–1971

Daniel George Belisle (May 9, 1937 – November 28, 2022) was a Canadian ice hockey player and coach. He played 4 games in the National Hockey League (NHL) during the 1960–61 season. The rest of his career, which lasted from 1957 to 1971, was spent in the minor leagues. He later became a coach in the minor leagues, and also coached the Washington Capitals in the NHL during the 1978–79 and 1979–80 seasons.

== Playing career ==
Belisle played junior hockey for the Guelph Biltmores and the Trois-Rivières Lions. He then signed with the New York Rangers of the National Hockey League, but his entire NHL career totaled four games during the 1960–61 season. He played fourteen years in the minor leagues, as a member of fifteen different clubs. Belisle's career year came in 1962-63, when he scored 70 points for the San Francisco Seals of the Western Hockey League.

== Coaching career ==
Belisle began his coaching career with the Des Moines Oak Leafs, the final team for which he played. In 1978, he was named head coach of the Washington Capitals, whom he coached to a 24–41–15 record. After a slow start at the beginning of the 1979–80 NHL season, he was fired and replaced by Gary Green. Belisle was voted Central Hockey League coach of the year in 1981 while coaching the Dallas Black Hawks. The Black Hawks, a farm team for the Vancouver Canucks, compiled a 56-16-7, setting records for most victories by a minor league team, most points by a minor league team, most goals scored by a team and most road victories. Belisle later became an assistant coach with the Detroit Red Wings during the early 1980s.

Belisle's son Dan Belisle was an ice hockey coach and executive in the North American Hockey League, Southern Hockey League, Colonial Hockey League, and ECHL, most notably serving as general manager for the ECHL's New Orleans Brass, Atlantic City Boardwalk Bullies, and Victoria Salmon Kings.

Belisle died November 28, 2022.

== Career statistics ==
=== Regular season and playoffs ===
			Regular season					Playoffs
Season	Team	League	GP	G	A	Pts	PIM	GP	G	A	Pts	PIM
1955–56	Guelph Biltmores	OHA	48	25	25	50	25	3	1	0	1	0
1956–57	Guelph Biltmores	OHA	52	36	30	66	70	10	6	10	16	21
1956–57	Guelph Biltmores	M-Cup	—	—	—	—	—	6	2	2	4	8
1957–58	Trois-Rivières Lions	QSHL	55	24	31	55	32	—	—	—	—	—
1957–58	Providence Reds	AHL	7	2	2	4	2	—	—	—	—	—
1958–59	Vancouver Canucks	WHL	70	31	31	62	41	9	4	1	5	13
1959–60	Vancouver Canucks	WHL	68	24	24	48	27	11	6	7	13	0
1960–61	New York Rangers	NHL	4	2	0	2	0	—	—	—	—	—
1960–61	Kitchener Beavers	EPHL	16	8	7	15	14	—	—	—	—	—
1960–61	Vancouver Canucks	WHL	51	30	17	47	17	9	0	2	2	0
1961–62	Los Angeles Blades	WHL	61	30	38	68	27	—	—	—	—	—
1962–63	San Francisco Seals	WHL	63	29	41	70	14	17	8	7	15	2
1963–64	Baltimore Clippers	AHL	13	1	2	3	4	—	—	—	—	—
1963–64	Vancouver Canucks	WHL	52	22	22	44	22	—	—	—	—	—
1964–65	Omaha Knights	CHL	6	2	6	8	2	—	—	—	—	—
1964–65	Quebec Aces	AHL	4	0	0	0	2	—	—	—	—	—
1964–65	Victoria Maple Leafs	WHL	53	23	24	47	40	12	2	5	7	6
1965–66	Memphis Wings	CHL	65	16	30	46	38	—	—	—	—	—
1966–67	California Seals	WHL	62	25	22	47	22	1	0	0	0	0
1967–68	Vancouver Canucks	WHL	66	15	20	35	8	—	—	—	—	—
1968–69	Jacksonville Rockets	EHL	71	39	46	85	26	4	2	1	3	0
1969–70	Barrie Flyers (1966–1979)	OHA Sr	7	1	2	3	16	—	—	—	—	—
1969–70	Columbus Checkers	IHL	58	32	43	75	21	—	—	—	—	—
1970–71	Des Moines Oak Leafs	IHL	41	8	21	29	10	—	—	—	—	—
WHL totals			546	229	239	468	218	59	20	22	42	21
NHL totals			4	2	0	2	0	—	—	—	—	—

=== Coaching record ===
Team	Year	Regular season						Postseason
Team	Year	G	W	L	T	Pts	Finish	Result
Washington Capitals	1978–79	80	21	41	15	63	4th in Norris	Missed playoffs
Washington Capitals	1979–80	16	4	10	2	10	2nd in Smythe	Fired
NHL totals		96	25	51	17			

Sporting positions
Preceded by Tom McVie	Head coach of the Washington Capitals; 1978–79	Succeeded by Gary Green
