= List of Sheffield Steelers seasons =

This is a list of seasons completed by the Sheffield Steelers ice hockey team, presently of the British Elite League. This list documents the season-by-season records of the Sheffield Steelers from their inaugural season in 1991–92 to the present day. Since achieving promotion to the Premier League in 1993, the Steelers have become one of the most successful teams in the history of British ice hockey.

The Steelers have won 10 league titles, in 1994–95, 1995–96, 2000–01, 2002–03, 2003–04, 2008–09, 2010–11, 2014–15, 2015–16 and 2023–24. 11 British Championships, in 1994–95, 1995–96, 1996–97, 2000–01, 2001–02, 2003–04, 2007–08, 2008–09, 2013–14, 2016–17 and 2023–24; 2 Autumn Cup titles, in 1995–96 and 2000–01; and six Challenge Cups, in 1998–99, 1999–00, 2000–01, 2002–03, 2019–20 and 2023–24. 20–20 Hockey Fest 2009. In addition, the club has appeared in eleven other cup finals. The Steelers have completed the Grand Slam of all trophies available during a season 3 times, in 1995–96, 2000–01 and 2023–24.

Autumn Cup winners	Regular season champions	Playoff champions	Challenge Cup winners	Finished bottom of standings	Promoted

Season	League	Level	Autumn Cup	Regular season									Postseason	Challenge Cup
Season	League	Level	Autumn Cup	Finish	GP	W	L	T	OTL	GF	GA	Pts	Postseason	Challenge Cup
1991–92	English Division One	3	N/A	2nd	32	27	4	1	–	378	163	55	Won Promotion Playoff Group	N/A
1992–93	British Division One	2	Finished first in qualifying group Lost in Quarter-final, 8–9 (Durham)	2nd	32	22	6	4	–	300	186	48	Won Promotion Playoff Group	N/A
1993–94	Premier League	1	Finished third in qualifying group	3rd	44	28	12	4	–	313	198	55	Finished first in qualifying group Won in Semi-final, 8–0 (Nottingham); Lost in Final, 1–12 (Cardiff)	N/A
1994–95	Premier League	1	Finished second in qualifying group Won in Quarter-final, 17–14 (Humberside); Lost in Semi-final, 8–12 (Cardiff)	1st	44	35	5	4	–	334	183	74	Finished first in qualifying group Won in Semi-final, 5–4 (Cardiff); Won British Championship, 7–2 (Murrayfield)	N/A
1995–96	Premier League	1	Finished first in qualifying group Won in Quarter-final, 9–7 (Cardiff); Won in Semi-final, 9–8 (Fife); Won Autumn Cup, 5–2 (Nottingham)	1st	36	27	4	5	–	268	122	59	Finished first in qualifying group Won in Semi-final, 6–3 (Humberside); Won British Championship, 4–3 (Nottingham)	N/A
1996–97	Super League	1	Finished first in qualifying group Won in Quarter-final, 8–3 (Newcastle); Lost in Semi-final, 3–6 (Nottingham)	2nd	42	27	9	4	2	168	127	60	Finished second in qualifying group Won in Semi-final, 5–2 (Cardiff); Won British Championship, 3–1 (Nottingham)	N/A
1997–98	Super League	1	Finished fourth in qualifying group Lost in Quarter-final, 4–8 (Cardiff)	6th	28	11	12	2	3	103	101	27	Finished second in qualifying group Lost in Semi-final, 0–2 (Ayr)	Finished second in qualifying group Lost in Semi-final, 5–7 (Bracknell)
1998–99	Super League	1	Finished second in qualifying group Won in Second Round, 23–3 (Peterborough); Lost in Quarter-final, 4–6 (Manchester)	6th	42	17	19	4	2	135	141	40	Finished third in qualifying group	Finished fourth in qualifying group Won in Semi-final, 8–1 (Manchester); Won Challenge Cup, 4–0 (Nottingham)
1999–00	Super League	1	Finished fourth in qualifying group Won in Second Round, 4–1 (Basingstoke); Lost in Quarter-final, 8–9 (Manchester)	2nd	42	24	14	2	2	188	155	52	Finished first in qualifying group Lost in Semi-final, 1–3 (Newcastle)	Finished third in qualifying group Won in Semi-final, 9–6 (Bracknell); Won Challenge Cup, 2–1 (Nottingham)
2000–01	Super League	1	Finished first in qualifying group Won in Quarter-final, 9–6 (Bracknell); Won in Semi-final, 7–5 (Nottingham); Won Autumn Cup, 4–0 (Newcastle)	1st	48	35	9	–	4	162	115	104	Finished second in qualifying group Won in Semi-final, 4–2 (Bracknell); Won British Championship, 2–1 (London)	Finished fourth in qualifying group Won in Semi-final, 8–2 (Belfast); Won Challenge Cup, 4–2 (Ayr)
2001–02	Super League	1	N/A	3rd	48	18	18	12	–	138	144	48	Finished second in qualifying group Won in Semi-final, 3–2 (London); Won British Championship, 4–3 (Manchester)	Finished seventh in qualifying group
2002–03	Super League	1	N/A	1st	32	18	8	5	1	86	57	42	Finished fourth in qualifying group Lost in Semi-final, 0–1 (Belfast)	Finished first in qualifying group Won in Semi-final, 5–4 (London); Won Challenge Cup, 3–2 (Nottingham)
2003–04	Elite League	1	N/A	1st	56	44	8	3	1	214	109	92	Finished first in qualifying group Won in Semi-final, 2–0 (Cardiff); Won British Championship, 2–1 (Nottingham)	Finished second in qualifying group Won in Semi-final, 4–2 (Cardiff); Lost in Final, 3–4 (Nottingham)
2004–05	Elite League	1	N/A	5th	50	25	17	5	3	118	110	58	Finished second in qualifying group Lost in Semi-final, 0–3 (Coventry)	Finished second in qualifying group Lost in Semi-final, 3–5 (Cardiff)
2005–06	Elite League	1	N/A	6th	42	15	19	6	2	105	135	38	Finished second in qualifying group Won in Semi-final, 2–1 (Cardiff); Lost in Final, 1–2 (Newcastle)	Finished third in qualifying group
2006–07	Elite League	1	N/A	4th	54	30	16	–	8	163	154	68	Lost in Quarter-final, 5–6 (Nottingham)	Finished first in qualifying group Won in Quarter-final, 5–4 (Nottingham); Won in Semi-final, 6–3 (Hull); Lost in Final, 4–9 (Coventry)
2007–08	Elite League	1	N/A	2nd	54	38	14	–	2	190	128	78	Won in Quarter-final, 9–8 (Manchester); Won in Semi-final, 2–1 (Cardiff); Won British Championship, 2–0 (Coventry)	Finished first in qualifying group Won in Semi-final, 6–4 (Cardiff); Lost in Final, 7–9 (Nottingham)
2008–09	Elite League	1	N/A	1st	54	41	6	-	7	201	115	89	Won in Quarter-final, 12–7 (Edinburgh); Won in Semi-final, 5–2 (Cardiff); Won British Championship, 2–0 (Nottingham)	Finished fourth in qualifying group
2009–10	Elite League	1	N/A	5th	56	24	26	–	6	194	196	54	Lost quarter final 9–5 (Cardiff)	Finished second in qualifying group Lost in Semi-final, 3–7 (Nottingham)
2010–11	Elite League	1	N/A	1st	54	43	10	–	0	265	132	87	Won quarter final 8–5 (Dundee) Lost semi final 4–3OT (Nottingham)	Finished third in qualifying group
2011–12	Elite League	1	N/A	2nd	54	32	11	–	2	209	130	84	Lost quarter final 7–4 (Hull)	Finished third in qualifying group
2012–13	Elite League	1	N/A	3rd	52	35	14	–	0	184	133	73	Lost quarter final 6–5 (Coventry)	Finished first in qualifying group Won quarter final 9–4 (Dundee) Won semi final 8–4 (Braehead) Lost final 5–3 (Nottingham)
2013–14	Elite League	1	N/A	2nd	52	31	17	–	1	172	141	66	Won quarter final 9–3 (Coventry) Won semi final 3–2 (Braehead) Won British Championship 3–2 (Belfast)	Finished third in qualifying group Won quarter final 11–5 (Dundee) Lost semi final 11–7 (Nottingham)
2014–15	Elite League	1	N/A	1st	52	35	13	–	1	193	134	74	Won quarter final 6–5 (Fife) Won semi final 3–2 (Hull) Lost final 4–2 (Coventry)	Finished first in qualifying group Won quarter final 14–1 (Dundee) Won semi final 7–6 (Nottingham) Lost final 2–1 (Coventry)
2015–16	Elite League	1	N/A	1st	52	34	14	–	0	190	161	72	Lost quarter final 8–6 (Coventry)	Finished first in qualifying group Won quarter final 7–4 (Fife) Lost semi final 10–0 (Nottingham)
2016–17	Elite League	1	N/A	3rd	52	35	14	–	2	196	135	73	Won quarter final 7–6OT (Nottingham) Won semi final 2–0 (Belfast) Won British Championship 6–5OT2 (Cardiff)	Finished first in qualifying group Won quarter final 9–3 (Edinburgh) Won semi final 5–1 (Nottingham) Lost final 3–2 (Cardiff)
2017–18	Elite League	1	N/A	3rd	56	34	19	–	2	217	140	71	Won quarter final 9–7 (Guildford) Won semi final 5–4 (Nottingham) Lost final 3–1 (Cardiff)	Finished first in qualifying group Won quarter final 13–3 (Dundee) Lost semi final 9–7 (Cardiff)
2018–19	Elite League	1	N/A	7th	60	30	26	–	3	183	203	64	Lost quarter final 11–8 (Cardiff)	Finished first in qualifying group Lost quarter final 9–8 (Guildford)
2019–20	Elite League	1	N/A	2nd	49	28	17	–	1	211	154	63	N/A	Finished first in qualifying group Won quarter final 8–5 (Manchester) Won semi final 9–1 (Glasgow) Won Challenge Cup 4–3 (Cardiff)
2021–22	Elite League	1	N/A	2nd	54	31	10	–	7	202	138	81	Lost quarter final 5–3 (Dundee)	Finished first in qualifying group Won quarter final 9–3 (Fife) Lost semi final 5–0 (Cardiff)
2022–23	Elite League	1	N/A	3rd	54	32	13	–	5	190	129	77	Won quarter final 7–4 (Manchester) Lost semi final 3–2OT (Cardiff)	Finished first in qualifying group Won quarter final 10–4 (Cardiff) Lost semi final 7–6SO (Fife)
2023–24	Elite League	1	N/A	1st	54	45	8	–	1	228	113	91	Won quarter final 13–5 (Fife) Won semi final 6–3 (Guildford) Won British Championship 3–1 (Belfast)	Finished first in qualifying group Won quarter final 10–2 ( Manchester) Won semi final 10–1 (Coventry) Won Challenge Cup 3–1 (Guildford)
2024–25	Elite League	1	N/A	2nd	54	37	14	–	3	217	137	77	Won quarter final 5–4OT (Glasgow) Lost semi final 4–3OT (Nottingham)	Finished first in qualifying group Lost semi final 7–6 (Cardiff)
2025–26	Elite League	1	N/A	4th	54	33	15	–	6	196	138	72	Won quarter final 6–2 (Guildford) Won Semi final 6–0 (Manchester) Lost final 5–2 (Cardiff)	Finished first in qualifying group Lost Semi final 5–4OT (Nottingham)
Regular season Totals					1,645	1,021	441	61	277	6,811	4,757	2,266	10 Regular Season Titles	
