= Jeff Mason =

American ice hockey player

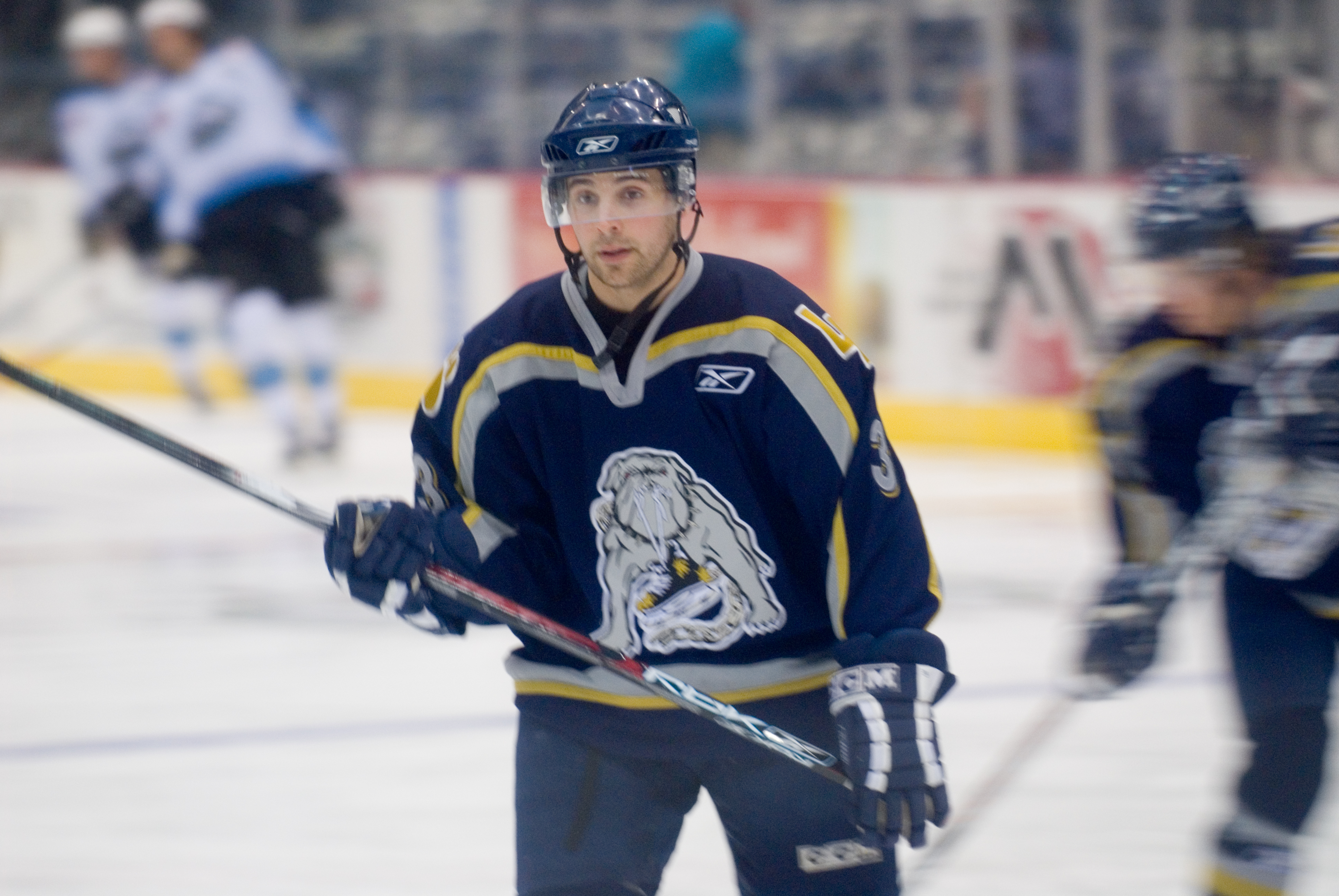
- Mason in 2007
- Born: August 11, 1981 (age 45) Easthampton, Massachusetts, U.S.
- Height: 5 ft 10 in (178 cm)
- Weight: 180 lb (82 kg; 12 st 12 lb)
- Position: Defense
- Shot: Right
- Played for: Hermes; Augusta Lynx; Long Beach Ice Dogs; Gwinnett Gladiators; Kalamazoo Wings; Heilbronner Falken; Belfast Giants; Lillehammer IK
- NHL draft: Undrafted
- Playing career: 2005–2018

Jeff Mason (born August 11, 1981) is an American former professional ice hockey defenseman and current associate coach for EIHL side Belfast Giants.

He was most recently the general manager and head coach of the Dundee Stars in the Elite Ice Hockey League (EIHL).

== Career ==
Mason played college hockey at Providence College in Hockey East. In his senior season Mason earned three awards at the teams annual awards banquet. Mason, who was captain of the 2004-05 team, earned the Ron Wilson Best Defensive Player Award, the Friar Award and Plus/Minus Award. He led the team with a plus/minus rating of +9, marking the second time in his four years at Providence that he was first on the squad in that category. Mason also earned the award in his freshman season as well as receiving the Reverend Herman Schneider Award, which is given to the most valuable freshman.

After four years at Providence College, Mason attended NHL training camp with the Pittsburgh Penguins. He then began his professional hockey career with Hermes in the Finnish second division before returning to North America and signing with the ECHL's Augusta Lynx in 2005. The next season, he signed with the Long Beach Ice Dogs and was the team's highest scoring defenseman, scoring 11 goals and 31 assists for 42 points in what was a difficult season for the Ice Dogs as they finished bottom of the Pacific Division. Mason then spent the next two seasons playing for the Gwinnett Gladiators. In his second season in 2008-09, Mason scored 14 goals and 22 assists for 36 points and was the team's top scoring defenseman. His 14 goals ranked second amongst ECHL defenseman.

In 2009-10, Mason split the season with the Kalamazoo Wings and in the German 2nd Bundesliga for the Heilbronner Falken. In 2010, Mason signed with the Belfast Giants of the United Kingdom's Elite Ice Hockey League. In 2011-12 Mason led the EIHL in Defenseman scoring with 19 goals and 41 assists for 60 points. Mason earned a First Team All-Star selection as well as being named the MVP Defenseman for the EIHL. The Giants won the Elite League title in 2011-12.

Mason joined Lillehammer IK in the Norwegian GET-ligaen for the 2012–13, but played just ten games before returning to the Giants for the remainder of the season and won the EIHL Championship for the second time with the Giants in 2013-14. In 2014-15 Mason tied for the team goal scoring lead amongst defenseman with 7 and was also voted the team's Best Defenseman. He remained with the Giants until his retirement after the 2017-18 season, during which the Giants won the Challenge Cup.

Mason ranks first all time in points by a Giants Defenceman and 6th overall for points scored in Giants history.

== Coaching career ==
In August 2019, Mason was appointed an assistant coach with his former club Belfast Giants, joining the staff of head coach Adam Keefe.

In May 2022, Mason was announced as the head coach and general manager of the Dundee Stars, replacing Omar Pacha. However, Mason and the Stars parted company after just one season in April 2023. Dundee missed the play-offs by four points, finishing in 10th.

In May 2023, Mason returned to the Belfast Giants as an associate coach.

== Career statistics ==
Season	Team	League	Regular Season					Playoffs
Season	Team	League	GP	G	A	Pts	PIM	GP	G	A	Pts	PIM
2001–02	Providence College	HE	34	1	9	10	10	--	--	--	--	--
2002–03	Providence College	HE	21	1	7	8	10	--	--	--	--	--
2003–04	Providence College	HE	33	4	2	6	10	--	--	--	--	--
2004–05	Providence College	HE	37	0	6	6	20	--	--	--	--	--
2005–06	Hermes	Mestis	13	2	2	4	6	--	--	--	--	--
2005–06	Augusta Lynx	ECHL	46	4	4	8	12	--	--	--	--	--
2006–07	Long Beach Ice Dogs	ECHL	71	11	31	42	62	--	--	--	--	--
2007–08	Gwinnett Gladiators	ECHL	70	5	15	20	44	8	4	2	6	0
2008–09	Gwinnett Gladiators	ECHL	71	14	22	36	26	3	0	0	0	0
2009–10	Kalamazoo Wings	ECHL	36	7	16	23	6	--	--	--	--	--
2009–10	Heilbronner Falken	2.GBun	16	3	3	6	0	6	0	1	1	0
2010–11	Belfast Giants	EIHL	43	11	20	31	36	3	1	0	1	0
2011–12	Belfast Giants	EIHL	54	19	41	60	52	3	1	3	4	4
2012–13	Lillehammer IK	Norway	10	2	2	4	0	--	--	--	--	--
2012–13	Belfast Giants	EIHL	38	6	16	22	35	4	0	0	0	0
2013–14	Belfast Giants	EIHL	47	7	19	26	18	4	0	2	2	0
2014–15	Belfast Giants	EIHL	51	6	19	25	12	4	1	2	3	0
2015–16	Belfast Giants	EIHL	38	2	5	7	10	--	--	--	--	--
2016–17	Belfast Giants	EIHL	31	1	10	11	10	--	--	--	--	--
2017–18	Belfast Giants	EIHL	33	0	12	12	8	2	0	0	0	0
ECHL Totals			287	41	88	129	144	11	4	2	6	0
EIHL Totals			335	52	142	194	181	20	3	7	10	4

== Awards and honors ==
Award	Year
EIHL First All-Star team	2011-12
EIHL MVP Defenseman	2011-12
EIHL League Champion	2011-12
EIHL League Champion	2013-14
EIHL Challenge Cup Champion	2017-18

== Personal life ==
Mason married Holly Sweeney in 2016. The pair had dated for several years and share a son together. Sweeney previously dated professional golfer Rory McIlroy before their public split in 2011.
