= Kevin Quick =

American ice hockey player (born 1988)

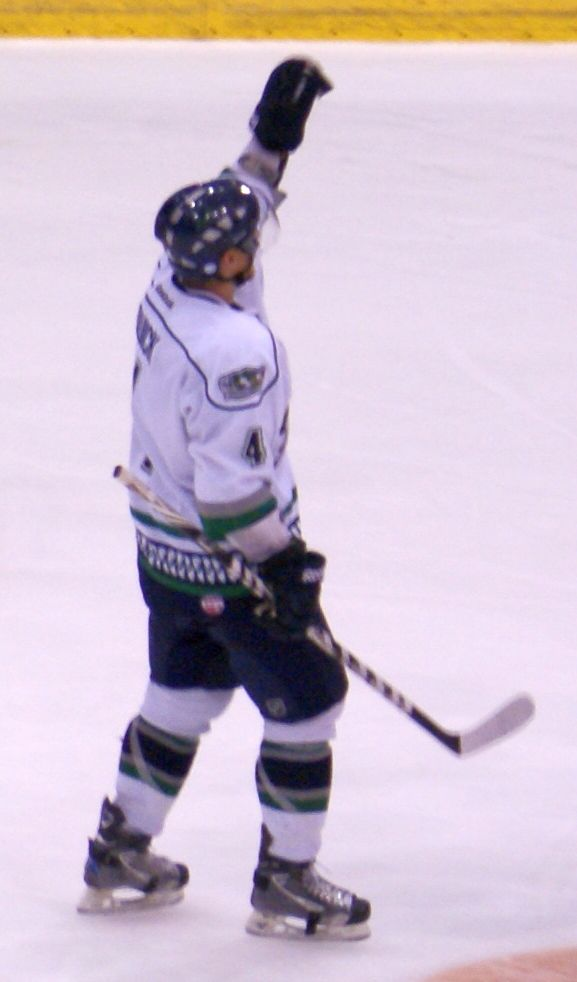
- Born: March 29, 1988 (age 38) Buffalo, New York, U.S.
- Height: 6 ft 0 in (183 cm)
- Weight: 175 lb (79 kg; 12 st 7 lb)
- Position: Defense
- Shot: Left
- Played for: Tampa Bay Lightning; Dundee Stars; Nottingham Panthers; China Dragon
- NHL draft: 78th overall, 2006; Tampa Bay Lightning
- Playing career: 2008–2017

Kevin Quick (born March 29, 1988) is an American former professional ice hockey defenseman. He was selected by the Tampa Bay Lightning in the 3rd round (78th overall) of the 2006 NHL entry draft.

== Playing career ==
During the 2008–09 season, Quick made his NHL debut and appeared in 6 games for the Lightning.

On October 1, 2012, Quick signed as a free agent with the South Carolina Stingrays of the ECHL on a one-year contract. During the 2012–13 season, Quick established a career-high 17 points in 64 games with the Stingrays, and was briefly loaned for a 3-game stint in the AHL with the Rockford IceHogs.

On June 19, 2014, Quick signed his first contract abroad agreeing to a one-year contract with the Dundee Stars of the Elite Ice Hockey League. After one season in Scotland with the Stars, Quick returned to North America, signing a one-year contract with the Indy Fuel of the ECHL on July 13, 2015.

In 2016, Quick was transferred to the Asia hockey league and became the alternate captain of China Dragon.

== Career statistics ==
=== Regular season and playoffs ===
			Regular season					Playoffs
Season	Team	League	GP	G	A	Pts	PIM	GP	G	A	Pts	PIM
2004–05	Salisbury School	USHS	27	3	9	12	2	—	—	—	—	—
2005–06	Salisbury School	USHS	28	3	20	23	6	—	—	—	—	—
2006–07	Salisbury School	USHS	25	1	10	11	10	—	—	—	—	—
2007–08	University of Michigan	CCHA	21	2	2	4	12	—	—	—	—	—
2007–08	Norfolk Admirals	AHL	18	0	4	4	6	—	—	—	—	—
2008–09	Augusta Lynx	ECHL	18	2	4	6	10	—	—	—	—	—
2008–09	Norfolk Admirals	AHL	49	1	8	9	8	—	—	—	—	—
2008–09	Tampa Bay Lightning	NHL	6	0	1	1	0	—	—	—	—	—
2008–09	Elmira Jackals	ECHL	—	—	—	—	—	9	0	1	1	0
2009–10	Norfolk Admirals	AHL	47	0	4	4	10	—	—	—	—	—
2010–11	Norfolk Admirals	AHL	45	0	15	15	0	1	0	1	1	0
2011–12	Norfolk Admirals	AHL	14	0	2	2	2	—	—	—	—	—
2011–12	Florida Everblades	ECHL	34	0	10	10	4	16	1	3	4	12
2012–13	South Carolina Stingrays	ECHL	64	3	14	17	28	4	0	1	1	0
2012–13	Rockford IceHogs	AHL	3	0	0	0	0	—	—	—	—	—
2013–14	South Carolina Stingrays	ECHL	10	0	4	4	4	4	0	0	0	2
2014–15	Dundee Stars	EIHL	60	4	23	27	34	—	—	—	—	—
2015–16	Indy Fuel	ECHL	37	1	12	13	10	—	—	—	—	—
2015–16	South Carolina Stingrays	ECHL	9	1	2	3	4	—	—	—	—	—
2015–16	Nottingham Panthers	EIHL	14	1	5	6	6	4	1	1	2	2
2016–17	China Dragon	ALH	48	7	29	36	32	—	—	—	—	—
AHL totals			176	1	33	34	26	2	0	0	0	2
ECHL totals			172	7	46	53	60	33	1	5	6	14
NHL totals			6	0	1	1	0	—	—	—	—	—

=== International ===
Year	Team	Event	GP	G	A	Pts	PIM
2005	United States	U18	5	0	0	0	2
Junior totals			5	0	0	0	2

== Awards and honors ==
Award	Year	Cite
ECHL
ECHL Kelly Cup Champion	2011-12	
EIHL
EIHL Cup Champion	2015-16	
EIHL Playoff Champion	2015-16	
