= Luke Ferrara =

British ice hockey player

- Born: 7 June 1993 (age 32); Peterborough, England
- Height: 1.80 m (5 ft 11 in)
- Weight: 89 kg (196 lb; 14 st 0 lb)
- Position: Forward
- Shoots: Right
- NIHL team Former teams: Peterborough Phantoms; Cardiff Devils; Sheffield Steelers; Boxers de Bordeaux; Cracovia Krakow; Coventry Blaze; Nottingham Panthers
- National team: Great Britain
- NHL draft: Undrafted
- Playing career: 2009–present

Luke Ferrara (born 7 June 1993) is a British ice hockey player who currently plays for UK NIHL side Peterborough Phantoms. A member of the British national team, Ferrara previously played with the Cardiff Devils, Sheffield Steelers, Coventry Blaze and Nottingham Panthers.

He represented Great Britain at the 2019 IIHF World Championship, 2021 IIHF World Championship and 2022 IIHF World Championship.

== Personal life ==
Ferrara's older brothers, Robert and James, are both former hockey players. They last played for NIHL side Peterborough Phantoms before retiring at the end of the 2019–20 season.

== Career ==
Ferrara began his career with the Peterborough Phantoms, before playing one Elite League game with Cardiff Devils during the 2012–13 season. He joined Sheffield Steelers ahead of the 2014–15 season, moving to Coventry in 2017.

Ahead of the 2020-21 Elite League season, Ferrara originally agreed a new two-year deal to remain in Coventry. However, following the suspension of the 2020-21 Elite League campaign, he was allowed to seek opportunities elsewhere.

The forward subsequently agreed an initial one-month contract in October 2020 with French Ligue Magnus side Boxers de Bordeaux. However he left upon the expiration of that deal in November.

On 29 November 2020 Ferrara moved to Polska Hokej Liga side Cracovia Krakow on a deal until the end of the season.

Ferrara returned to Coventry to take part in the 2021 'Elite Series'. He later returned to Coventry for the 2021-22 Elite League season.

In June 2022, Ferrara left Coventry after the best part of five years with the team, switching to fellow Elite League side Nottingham Panthers for the 2022-23 season.

In June 2023, Ferrara rejoined hometown club Peterborough Phantoms.

== Career statistics ==
=== Regular season and playoffs ===
As of July 2022

			Regular season					Playoffs
Season	Team	League	GP	G	A	Pts	PIM	GP	G	A	Pts	PIM
2009–10	Peterborough Phantoms	EPIHL	48	2	9	11	0	2	0	0	0	0
2010–11	Peterborough Phantoms	EPIHL	50	11	16	27	8	2	0	0	0	0
2011–12	Peterborough Phantoms	EPIHL	36	24	20	44	10	2	1	1	2	0
2012–13	Cardiff Devils	EIHL	1	1	0	1	0	—	—	—	—	—
2012–13	Peterborough Phantoms	EPIHL	51	22	27	49	32	2	0	0	0	2
2013–14	Peterborough Phantoms	EPIHL	54	27	28	55	46	—	—	—	—	—
2014–15	Sheffield Steelers	EIHL	18	0	0	0	0	—	—	—	—	—
2014–15	Peterborough Phantoms	EPIHL	40	24	20	44	18	4	2	3	5	2
2015–16	Sheffield Steelers	EIHL	52	5	5	10	2	2	0	0	0	0
2016–17	Sheffield Steelers	EIHL	52	3	7	10	6	4	0	1	1	0
2017–18	Coventry Blaze	EIHL	48	11	18	29	14	2	0	0	0	2
2018–19	Coventry Blaze	EIHL	60	18	22	40	14	2	0	0	0	0
2019–20	Coventry Blaze	EIHL	47	33	21	54	18	—	—	—	—	—
2020–21	Boxers de Bordeaux	Ligue Magnus	4	1	3	4	0	—	—	—	—	—
2020–21	Cracovia Krakow	Polska Hokej Liga	17	4	6	10	10	7	2	2	4	2
2020–21	Coventry Blaze	Elite Series	11	4	4	8	0	—	—	—	—	—
2021–22	Coventry Blaze	EIHL	52	25	24	49	18	2	0	0	0	0
2022–23	Nottingham Panthers	EIHL	42	5	7	12	10	—	—	—	—	—
