= 2019–20 EIHL season =

- League: Elite Ice Hockey League
- Sport: Ice hockey
- Duration: Scheduled for: 7 September 2019 – 29 March 2020 (regular season); April 2020 (playoffs)
- Average attendance: 3,043

Regular season
- League: No winner

Conference

Playoffs

EIHL seasons
- ← 2018–19 2021–22 →

The 2019–20 EIHL season was the 17th season of the Elite Ice Hockey League. The regular season commenced on 7 September 2019 and was due to end on 29 March 2020, with the playoffs following in April 2020. The reigning league champions were the Belfast Giants, who won the title on the final day of the regular season, in 2018–19.

On 13 March 2020, two weekends before the regular season was due to end, league officials cancelled all remaining matches due to be held; this was as a result of the COVID-19 pandemic in the United Kingdom.

== Teams ==
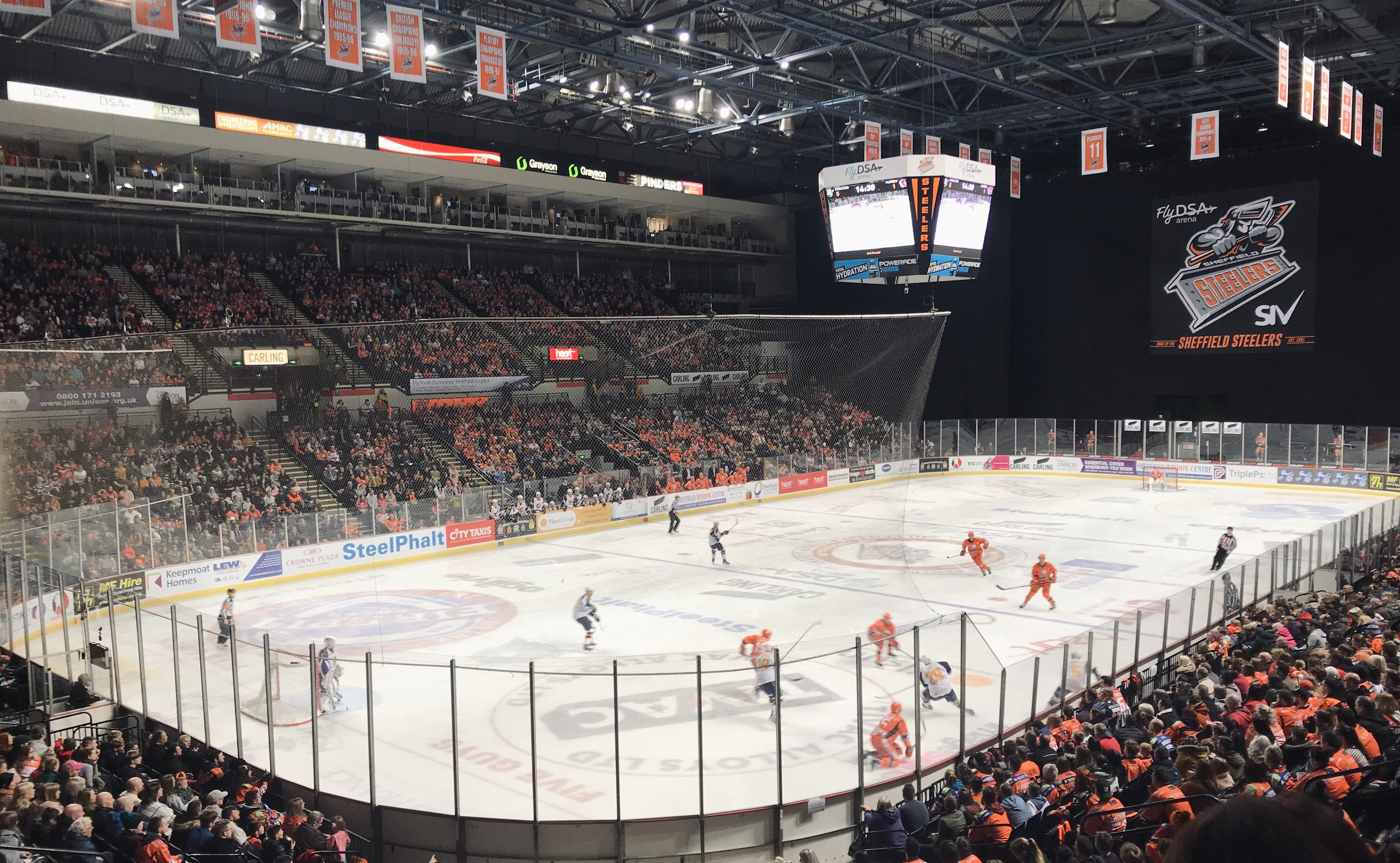
Sheffield Steelers vs Guildford Flames, 4 January 2020

After having eleven teams for the 2018–19 season, the league reduced to ten for the 2019–20 season. This was due to the Milton Keynes Lightning – who had finished bottom of the league – returning to the National Ice Hockey League. For the first time since 2011–12, the league did not feature Conference splits.

Team	City/Town	Arena	Capacity
Belfast Giants	Belfast	SSE Arena Belfast	7,200
Cardiff Devils	(Wales) Cardiff	Ice Arena Wales	3,100
Coventry Blaze	(England) Coventry	Coventry Skydome	3,000
Dundee Stars	(Scotland) Dundee	Dundee Ice Arena	2,400
Fife Flyers	(Scotland) Kirkcaldy	Fife Ice Arena	3,525
Glasgow Clan	(Scotland) Glasgow	Braehead Arena	4,000
Guildford Flames	(England) Guildford	Guildford Spectrum	2,001
Manchester Storm	(England) Altrincham	Altrincham Ice Dome	2,351
Nottingham Panthers	(England) Nottingham	National Ice Centre	7,500
Sheffield Steelers	(England) Sheffield	FlyDSA Arena	8,500

== League standings at time of cancellation ==
Each team was scheduled to play 54 games, playing each of the other nine teams six times: three times on home ice, and three times away from home. Points were awarded for each game, where two points are awarded for all victories, regardless of whether it was in regulation time or after overtime or game-winning shots. One point was awarded for losing in overtime or game-winning shots, and zero points for losing in regulation time. At the end of the regular season, the team that finished with the most points would normally be crowned the league champion.

However, after the coronavirus pandemic forced the cancellation of the season, it was agreed the season would finish without a league winner; Sheffield Steelers won the Challenge Cup; league leaders Cardiff Devils qualified for the 2020–21 Champions Hockey League.

Pos	Team	Pld	W	OTW	OTL	L	GF	GA	GD	Pts	Qualification
1	Cardiff Devils (Q)	46	28	3	2	13	162	138	+24	64	Qualification to playoffs
2	Sheffield Steelers (Q)	49	28	3	1	17	211	154	+57	63	Qualification to playoffs
3	Coventry Blaze (Q)	48	25	2	7	14	180	158	+22	61	Qualification to playoffs
4	Belfast Giants (Q)	48	26	2	4	16	149	125	+24	60	Qualification to playoffs
5	Nottingham Panthers (Q)	46	21	6	4	15	147	124	+23	58	Qualification to playoffs
6	Guildford Flames (Q)	47	19	6	3	19	146	146	0	53	Qualification to playoffs
7	Glasgow Clan	48	14	5	3	26	141	181	−40	41	Qualification to playoffs
8	Manchester Storm	49	12	6	5	26	119	151	−32	41	Qualification to playoffs
9	Dundee Stars	48	16	2	3	27	146	179	−33	39	
10	Fife Flyers	49	14	1	4	30	124	169	−45	34	

Updated to match(es) played on 8 March 2020. Source: Elite League
Rules for classification:
- In-season: 1) Points; 2) Fewest games played; end of season criteria as below.
- End of season: 1) Points; 2) Games won in regulation time; 3) Number of games won; 4) Head-to-head results, ranked by criteria 1 to 3; 5) Fewest regulation losses; 6) Away game results, ranked by criteria 1 to 3; 7) Goals scored; 8) Goal difference; 9) Fewest penalty minutes; 10) Drawing of lots.
(Q) Qualified to the phase indicated

== Statistics ==
=== Scoring leaders ===
The following players led the league in points, at the conclusion of matches played on 8 March 2020. If two or more skaters are tied (i.e. same number of points, goals and played games), all of the tied skaters are shown.

Player	Team	GP	G	A	Pts	+/–	PIM
Sam Herr	Nottingham Panthers	46	30	29	59	+16	42
Joey Haddad	Cardiff Devils	46	29	28	57	+11	30
Brendan Connolly	Sheffield Steelers	48	26	29	55	+16	86
Luke Ferrara	Coventry Blaze	47	33	21	54	+4	18
Charles Corcoran	Coventry Blaze	48	17	35	52	–11	16
Marc-Olivier Vallerand	Sheffield Steelers	40	26	25	51	+12	47
Andrew Johnston	Coventry Blaze	48	21	29	50	+9	54
Janne Laakkonen	Coventry Blaze	43	9	40	49	+8	16
Anthony DeLuca	Sheffield Steelers	42	26	21	47	+19	61
Gleason Fournier	Cardiff Devils	46	13	34	47	+3	18

=== Leading goaltenders ===
The following goaltenders led the league in goals against average, at the conclusion of matches played on 8 March 2020, providing they had played 1080 minutes.

Player	Team	GP	TOI	W	L	GA	SO	SV%	GAA
Shane Owen	Belfast Giants	43	2445:10	24	17	97	2	91.65%	2.38
Kevin Carr	Nottingham Panthers	37	2233:25	22	15	90	4	91.78%	2.42
C. J. Motte	Coventry Blaze	24	1465:20	15	9	61	3	92.68%	2.50
Matt Ginn	Manchester Storm	49	2914:18	18	30	137	3	92.11%	2.82
Ben Bowns	Cardiff Devils	46	2763:31	31	15	130	2	90.50%	2.82
