= Dan Ceman =

Canadian ice hockey player and coach

- Born: July 25, 1973 (age 53) Windsor, Ontario, Canada
- Height: 6 ft 0 in (183 cm)
- Weight: 196 lb (89 kg; 14 st 0 lb)
- Position: Centre
- Shot: Right
- Played for: AHL; Kentucky Thoroughblades; Portland Pirates; Providence Bruins; ECHL; Hampton Roads Admirals
- NHL draft: Undrafted
- Playing career: 1997–2012

Dan Ceman (born July 25, 1973) is a Canadian professional ice hockey coach and a former ice hockey player. He is currently the head coach of Slovak HC Košice.

== Playing career ==
Born in Windsor, Ontario and has Slovak descent, with grandparents originating from Novosad in Eastern Slovakia. Ceman attended the University of Windsor before turning pro in 1997. He first played for AHL’s Kentucky Thoroughblades. In the 1997-98 season he was instrumental in the Hampton Roads Admirals’ run to the ECHL championship title, the following season, he won the Calder Cup with the Providence Bruins.

Ceman then took his game overseas, joining the Sheffield Steelers of the British Ice Hockey Superleague for the 1999-00 campaign. He remained in England until 2003, spending the next three years with the Bracknell Bees.

He then spent time playing in Denmark and France, before returning to England for the 2005-06 season, which he split between EIHL sides Sheffield Steelers and Nottingham Panthers. In 2006, Ceman embarked on a four-year stint with Danish first-division side SønderjyskE Ishockey. As a team captain, Ceman led SønderjyskE to back-to-back Danish championships in 2009 and 2010.

Ceman spent the last two years of his playing career in the Elite Ice Hockey League, turning out for the Dundee Stars (acting as player-coach) and the Fife Flyers: On December 7, 2011, with the team standing at second-last in the league, the Dundee Stars announced that Ceman had been released for performance. On 13 December 2011 it was announced that Ceman had signed with the Fife Flyers for the remainder of the 2011-12 season. Ceman announced on May 30, 2012 that he had signed to become an assistant coach in Denmark and would retire as a player.

== Coaching career ==
After serving as player-coach of the Dundee Stars from 2010 to 2012, Ceman was named head coach of Danish second division side Vojens IK in 2012. In April 2013, he joined the coaching staff of SønderjyskE Ishockey of the Danish top-flight as an assistant, helping the team win the 2013 Danish championship. In May 2013, he was promoted to SønderjyskE Ishockey head coach and guided the club to championship titles in 2014 and 2015. In February 2015, he signed a new two-year deal with the club. In 2017 he signed deal with HC '05 Banská Bystrica. In 2021 he became the head coach of HC Košice.

== Career statistics ==
			Regular season					Playoffs
Season	Team	League	GP	G	A	Pts	PIM	GP	G	A	Pts	PIM
1991–92	Windsor Bulldogs	WOHL	46	12	16	28	25	—	—	—	—	—
1992–93	Windsor Bulldogs	WOHL	49	32	42	74	56	—	—	—	—	—
1994–95	University of Windsor	CIAU	24	7	9	16	0	—	—	—	—	—
1995–96	University of Windsor	CIAU	27	15	17	32	0	—	—	—	—	—
1996–97	University of Windsor	CIAU	26	25	40	65	12	—	—	—	—	—
1996–97	Kentucky Thoroughblades	AHL	11	1	4	5	23	—	—	—	—	—
1997–98	Hampton Roads Admirals	ECHL	58	15	21	36	47	20	11	5	16	33
1997–98	Portland Pirates	AHL	4	0	1	1	2	—	—	—	—	—
1998–99	Hampton Roads Admirals	ECHL	70	38	39	77	66	4	1	4	5	2
1998–99	Providence Bruins	AHL	3	1	0	1	0	2	0	0	0	0
1999–00	Sheffield Steelers	BISL	42	16	13	29	34	7	4	2	6	14
2000–01	Bracknell Bees	BISL	45	17	30	47	58	7	3	9	12	0
2001–02	Bracknell Bees	BISL	48	19	26	45	26	6	2	3	5	0
2002–03	Bracknell Bees	BISL	32	16	12	28	22	16	8	14	22	18
2003–04	Frederikshavn White Hawks	Denmark	36	23	25	48	58	4	2	1	3	6
2003–04	Scorpions de Mulhouse	France	3	0	0	0	0	5	3	1	4	8
2004–05	Frederikshavn White Hawks	Denmark	36	15	21	36	34	14	3	10	13	22
2005–06	Sheffield Steelers	EIHL	14	3	11	14	4	—	—	—	—	—
2005–06	Nottingham Panthers	EIHL	17	4	11	15	8	6	2	4	6	12
2006–07	SønderjyskE Ishockey	Denmark	36	7	19	26	42	13	4	4	8	47
2007–08	SønderjyskE Ishockey	Denmark	45	24	32	56	30	13	2	10	12	24
2008–09	SønderjyskE Ishockey	Denmark	44	21	28	49	56	16	8	7	15	12
2009–10	SønderjyskE Ishockey	Denmark	35	5	22	27	22	13	6	9	15	6
2010–11	Dundee Stars	EIHL	54	30	40	70	66	2	0	1	1	4
2011–12	Dundee Stars	EIHL	19	6	5	11	12	—	—	—	—	—
2011–12	Fife Flyers	EIHL	25	6	10	16	22	—	—	—	—	—
AHL totals			18	2	5	7	25	2	0	0	0	0
ECHL totals			128	53	60	113	113	24	12	9	21	35
BISL totals			167	68	81	149	140	36	17	28	45	32
Denmark totals			232	95	147	242	242	73	25	41	66	117
EIHL totals			129	49	77	126	112	8	2	5	7	16
