= 2021–22 EIHL season =

- League: Elite Ice Hockey League
- Sport: Ice hockey
- Duration: 25 September 2021 – 17 April 2022; (regular season); 23 April – 1 May 2022; (playoffs)
- Teams: 10
- Average attendance: 2,885

Regular season
- Regular season winners: Belfast Giants

Playoffs

Finals
- Champions: Cardiff Devils
- Runners-up: Belfast Giants

EIHL seasons
- 2019–20 2022–23

The 2021–22 EIHL season was the 18th season of the Elite Ice Hockey League. The regular season commenced on 25 September 2021, and finished on 17 April 2022, with the playoffs taking place over the following two weekends. The previous campaign in 2020–21 was suspended indefinitely in September 2020, due to the COVID-19 pandemic in the United Kingdom; a reduced Elite Series was held in April and May 2021, involving the Sheffield Steelers, the Nottingham Panthers, the Coventry Blaze and the Manchester Storm, to provide competitive ice time for players ahead of the 2021 IIHF World Championship.

The Belfast Giants won the regular season title for a record-equalling fifth time with two games to spare, following their 2–1 overtime win at their closest challengers, the Sheffield Steelers, on 10 April 2022. Having also won the Challenge Cup, the Belfast Giants as national league and cup champions had an opportunity to seal a Grand Slam in the playoff final by becoming British national champions for the third time, however they lost 6–3 to the Cardiff Devils – who thereby won their third consecutive playoff title and national championship, denying the table-topping Giants the Grand Slam for the second consecutive season.

== Teams ==
The same ten teams that competed in the last regular season in 2019–20 competed in the 2021–22 season.

Team	City/Town	Arena	Capacity
Belfast Giants	Belfast	SSE Arena Belfast	8,700
Cardiff Devils	(Wales) Cardiff	Ice Arena Wales	3,100
Coventry Blaze	(England) Coventry	Coventry Skydome	3,000
Dundee Stars	(Scotland) Dundee	Dundee Ice Arena	2,400
Fife Flyers	(Scotland) Kirkcaldy	Fife Ice Arena	3,525
Glasgow Clan	(Scotland) Glasgow	Braehead Arena	4,000
Guildford Flames	(England) Guildford	Guildford Spectrum	2,001
Manchester Storm	(England) Altrincham	Altrincham Ice Dome	2,351
Nottingham Panthers	(England) Nottingham	Motorpoint Arena Nottingham	7,500
Sheffield Steelers	(England) Sheffield	Utilita Arena Sheffield	9,300

== Regular season ==
=== League standings ===
Each team played 54 games, playing each of the other nine teams six times: three times on home ice, and three times away from home. Points were awarded for each game, where two points were awarded for all victories, regardless of whether it was in regulation time or after overtime or game-winning shots. One point was awarded for losing in overtime or game-winning shots, and zero points for losing in regulation time. At the end of the regular season, the team that finished with the most points was crowned the league champion, and qualified for the 2022–23 Champions Hockey League. The top eight teams qualified for the playoffs.

Pos	Team	Pld	W	OTW	OTL	L	GF	GA	GD	Pts	Qualification
1	Belfast Giants (C)	54	37	6	2	9	224	108	+116	88	Regular season champions Qualification to playoffs
2	Sheffield Steelers	54	31	6	7	10	202	138	+64	81	Qualification to playoffs
3	Cardiff Devils	54	30	5	4	15	188	131	+57	74	Qualification to playoffs
4	Nottingham Panthers	54	22	3	5	24	163	191	−28	55	Qualification to playoffs
5	Guildford Flames	54	19	6	4	25	165	169	−4	54	Qualification to playoffs
6	Glasgow Clan	54	21	2	7	24	150	182	−32	53	Qualification to playoffs
7	Dundee Stars	54	19	6	3	26	160	185	−25	53	Qualification to playoffs
8	Coventry Blaze	54	19	4	5	26	154	173	−19	51	Qualification to playoffs
9	Manchester Storm	54	14	4	4	32	150	210	−60	40	
10	Fife Flyers	54	12	4	5	33	122	191	−69	37	

Source: Elite League
Rules for classification: 1) Points; 2) Games won in regulation time; 3) Number of games won; 4) Head-to-head results, ranked by criteria 1 to 3; 5) Fewest regulation losses; 6) Away game results, ranked by criteria 1 to 3; 7) Goals scored; 8) Goal difference; 9) Fewest penalty minutes; 10) Drawing of lots.
(C) Champion

=== Results ===
Home \ Away	BEL	CAR	COV	DUN	FIF	GLA	GUI	MAN	NOT	SHE	BEL	CAR	COV	DUN	FIF	GLA	GUI	MAN	NOT	SHE	BEL	CAR	COV	DUN	FIF	GLA	GUI	MAN	NOT	SHE
Belfast	—	1–0	6–1	2–3	3–1	3–2	6–2	7–2	7–2	5–1	—	5–3	3–0	7–1	4–1	5–1	5–1	6–2	2–4	2–5	—	1–2 (SO)	7–6	4–1	7–1	5–1	5–0	6–3	4–1	5–4 (OT)
Cardiff	3–2	—	3–4	1–2	5–1	4–2	2–0	3–0	0–3	3–5	4–2	—	6–2	7–1	3–2	3–1	6–2	5–3	5–1	5–4 (OT)	4–1	—	3–0	4–1	4–0	4–2	1–2 (OT)	7–1	5–2	2–6
Coventry	3–5	0–2	—	5–1	2–0	2–5	4–3 (SO)	8–3	0–1	1–2 (SO)	1–7	3–4 (SO)	—	7–2	6–2	8–1	1–5	3–2 (SO)	5–0	1–5	2–3	3–0	—	3–4 (OT)	2–1	2–0	1–5	1–2 (SO)	4–6	1–2
Dundee	1–4	4–6	3–0	—	3–6	5–2	7–0	3–2	4–1	1–2	4–3 (OT)	3–2	2–1	—	2–4	3–5	3–4 (SO)	4–1	5–4 (OT)	3–2	0–7	5–3	4–1	—	6–0	6–3	0–5	3–4 (SO)	8–3	2–1 (OT)
Fife	0–3	3–1	6–2	1–4	—	4–5 (OT)	3–0	8–0	2–4	2–6	2–3 (OT)	2–4	2–3	4–3	—	3–2 (OT)	1–4	1–5	2–4	5–3	2–3 (SO)	2–1 (SO)	3–2 (OT)	1–5	—	3–4	4–2	4–5 (OT)	3–4 (OT)	2–5
Glasgow	0–6	2–5	2–3 (SO)	5–2	4–1	—	4–3	3–1	1–4	3–6	3–1	2–3	4–6	4–3	5–2	—	1–2 (OT)	4–3	2–5	5–3	1–7	6–3	2–4	1–2 (OT)	7–2	—	3–0	7–4	3–4 (OT)	2–0
Guildford	1–3	2–1	3–4 (OT)	3–0	6–1	4–2	—	3–0	3–4	3–6	1–4	2–6	1–2	7–1	1–5	8–2	—	6–5 (OT)	1–3	0–1 (OT)	3–4	6–5 (OT)	4–3	7–3	4–2	1–3	—	4–2	5–4 (OT)	1–3
Manchester	3–0	2–3 (OT)	5–2	6–2	5–0	1–5	2–6	—	4–0	2–7 (Note: A medical emergency within the Altrincham Ice Dome resulted in this match being ended with 11:54 remaining.)	1–6	5–6	1–4	4–3	0–3	4–2	4–3	—	4–2	0–3	5–6 (OT)	1–4	4–1	3–6	4–1	6–1	1–2	—	7–4	4–3 (SO)
Nottingham	0–5	5–2	2–5	2–1	2–4	2–3	4–3	5–3	—	1–4	2–7	4–1	4–10	4–3 (OT)	4–2	1–2	5–2	4–2	—	3–7	2–3 (SO)	3–7	9–1	5–2	1–2 (OT)	1–2 (OT)	3–5	5–2	—	3–0
Sheffield	7–1	5–4 (OT)	3–4	3–1	5–2	3–2 (OT)	4–6	5–2	5–3	—	1–3	0–5	3–1	5–4	6–0	3–2 (OT)	4–3 (OT)	2–1	4–2	—	1–2 (SO)	2–3 (SO)	5–3	4–5 (SO)	3–1	3–2	6–5	8–2	6–2	—

Source: Elite League
Legend: Blue = home team win; Yellow = draw; Red = away team win.

=== Statistics ===
==== Scoring leaders ====
The following players led the league in points, at the conclusion of the regular season.

Player	Team	GP	G	A	Pts	+/–	PIM
(United States) J.J. Piccinich	Belfast Giants	52	35	45	80	+48	22
(United Kingdom) Scott Conway	Belfast Giants	53	33	45	78	+37	56
(United States) Charlie Combs	Dundee Stars	52	30	35	65	+4	44
(Canada) Mark Cooper	Belfast Giants	53	28	33	61	+27	25
(Sweden) Sebastian Bengtsson	Dundee Stars	51	28	32	60	+8	6
(Canada) Adam Brady	Manchester Storm	54	25	35	60	−28	24
(Canada) Mathieu Roy	Glasgow Clan	53	33	26	59	+8	46
(Canada) Brodie Reid	Cardiff Devils	52	31	28	59	+7	10
(Canada) Marc-Olivier Vallerand	Sheffield Steelers	45	26	33	59	+24	44
(United States) David Goodwin	Belfast Giants	48	18	40	58	+33	14

==== Leading goaltenders ====
The following goaltenders led the league in goals against average, provided that they have played at least 40% of their team's minutes, at the conclusion of the regular season.

Player	Team	GP	TOI	W	L	GA	SO	SV%	GAA
(Canada) Tyler Beskorowany	Belfast Giants	41	2384:47	32	9	67	6	93.17%	1.69
(United States) Mac Carruth	Cardiff Devils	41	2355:05	24	16	84	5	93.67%	2.14
(Slovenia) Rok Stojanovič	Sheffield Steelers	35	2107:06	24	11	79	2	92.53%	2.25
(Sweden) Kevin Lindskoug	Guildford Flames	49	2910:39	23	26	140	3	90.95%	2.89
(United States) C. J. Motte	Coventry Blaze	51	2950:29	21	29	147	4	91.12%	2.99

== Playoffs ==
=== Bracket ===
In the two-legged quarter-finals, the highest-ranked team met the lowest-ranked team, the second-highest-ranked team met the second-lowest-ranked team and so forth. The winners of each tie was determined by aggregate scoring over the two games. In the semi-finals, the highest remaining seed was matched against the lowest remaining seed, with the other two teams facing off. The winners of the semi-finals progressed to the Final, with the losers playing in the third-place match.

Quarter-finals (23–24 April)
1	Belfast Giants	2	2	4
8	Coventry Blaze	2	1	3
2	Sheffield Steelers	0	3	3
7	Dundee Stars	1	4	5
(Pairings are reseeded after the first round)
3	Cardiff Devils	3	2	5
6	Glasgow Clan	4	0	4
4	Nottingham Panthers	4	2	6
5	Guildford Flames	4	3	7

Semi-finals (30 April)
1	Belfast Giants	6
7	Dundee Stars	0
3	Cardiff Devils	3
5	Guildford Flames	2

Final (1 May)
1	Belfast Giants	3
3	Cardiff Devils	6
Third place
5	Guildford Flames	7
7	Dundee Stars	5

=== Quarter-finals ===
The quarter-final schedule was announced after the conclusion of the final-day regular season matches.

==== (1) Belfast Giants vs. (8) Coventry Blaze ====
23 April 2022	Coventry Blaze	2–2	Belfast Giants	Coventry Skydome; Attendance:1,645	Recap
No scoring		First period	5:50 – Darcy Murphy (1)
No scoring		Second period	No scoring
Janne Kivilahti (1) – 11:50; Nat Halbert (1) – 18:11		Third period	15:04 – Slater Doggett (1)
C. J. Motte (23 saves / 25 shots)		Goalie stats	Tyler Beskorowany (31 saves / 33 shots)

24 April 2022	Belfast Giants	2–1	SO	Coventry Blaze	SSE Arena Belfast; Attendance:4,587	Recap
No scoring		First period		No scoring
Tyler Soy (1) – 5:52		Second period		7:55 – Conner Chaulk (1)
No scoring		Third period		No scoring
Ben Lake (miss); J.J. Piccinich (miss); Slater Doggett (miss); Scott Conway (miss); David Goodwin; Scott Conway; David Goodwin (miss); Scott Conway (miss); Ben Lake (miss); J.J. Piccinich		Shootout		(miss) Janne Kivilahti; Luke Ferrara; (miss) Evan Bloodoff; (miss) Ross Venus; Johnny Curran; Janne Kivilahti; (miss) Luke Ferrara; Janne Kivilahti; Johnny Curran; Janne Kivilahti
Tyler Beskorowany (24 saves / 25 shots)		Goalie stats		C. J. Motte (38 saves / 39 shots)

Belfast Giants win 4–3 on aggregate.

==== (2) Sheffield Steelers vs. (7) Dundee Stars ====
23 April 2022	Sheffield Steelers	0–1	Dundee Stars	Sheffield Arena; Attendance: 6,083	Recap
No scoring		First period	No scoring
No scoring		Second period	No scoring
No scoring		Third period	17:21 – Sebastian Bengtsson (1)
Barry Brust (23 shots / 22 saves)		Goalie stats	Adam Morrison (32 shots / 32 saves)

24 April 2022	Dundee Stars	4–3	Sheffield Steelers	Dundee Ice Arena; Attendance: 2,157	Recap
No scoring		First period	9:59 – Marc-Olivier Vallerand (1; PPG); 14:22 – Marc-Olivier Vallerand (2)
Kalvis Ozols (1; PPG) – 17:51		Second period	0:59 – Martin Látal (1)
Sebastian Bengtsson (2) – 12:26; Sebastian Bengtsson (3; PPG) – 18:55; Dillon Lawrence (1; ENG) – 19:39		Third period	No scoring
Adam Morrison (19 shots / 16 saves)		Goalie stats	Rok Stojanovič (17 shots / 14 saves)

Dundee Stars win 5–3 on aggregate.

==== (3) Cardiff Devils vs. (6) Glasgow Clan ====
23 April 2022	Cardiff Devils	3–4	Glasgow Clan	Ice Arena Wales; Attendance: 3,100	Recap
Matthew Register – pp – 8:53		First period	18:29 – Colin Campbell (1)
Trevor Cox (1) – 14:25		Second period	8:31 – Guillaume Gauthier (1); 10:26 – Nolan LaPorte (1)
Cole Sanford (1) – 17:45		Third period	6:49 – Nolan LaPorte (2)
Mac Carruth (26 saves / 26 shots)		Goalie stats	Shane Starrett (36 saves / 39 shots)

24 April 2022	Glasgow Clan	0–2	Cardiff Devils	Braehead Arena; Attendance: 3,327	Recap
No scoring		First period	No scoring
No scoring		Second period	No scoring
No scoring		Third period	7:41 – pp – Jake Coughler; 17:35 – Trevor Cox (2)
Shane Starrett (23 saves / 25 shots)		Goalie stats	Mac Carruth (26 saves / 26 shots)

Cardiff Devils win 5–4 on aggregate.

==== (4) Nottingham Panthers vs. (5) Guildford Flames ====
23 April 2022	Guildford Flames	4–4	Nottingham Panthers	Guildford Spectrum; Attendance: 1,546	Recap
No scoring		First period	6:24 – Sean Richards (1)
Turner Ripplinger (1) – 5:04; Mike Crocock (1) – 10:48		Second period	5:40 – Sean Richards (2); 13:07 – pp – Christophe Boivin (1)
Ian McNulty – pp – 5:07; Owen Griffiths (1) – 18:16		Third period	13:29 – Matthew Myers (1)
Kevin Lindskoug (32 saves / 36 shots)		Goalie stats	Kevin Carr (30 saves / 34 shots)

24 April 2022	Nottingham Panthers	2–3	Guildford Flames	Motorpoint Arena Nottingham; Attendance: 4,051	Recap
Christophe Boivin (2) – 5:01		First period	7:58 – Levi Cable (1)
Jeremy Welsh (1) – 8:20		Second period	No scoring
No scoring		Third period	15:31 – Turner Ripplinger (2); 17:11 – Levi Cable (2)
Kevin Carr (22 saves / 25 shots)		Goalie stats	Kevin Lindskoug (35 saves / 37 shots)

Guildford Flames win 7–6 on aggregate.

=== Semi-finals ===
The schedule for the Playoff Finals weekend was announced after the conclusion of the quarter-final matches.

30 April 2022; 15:00	Belfast Giants	6–0 (1–0, 3–0, 2–0)	Dundee Stars	Motorpoint Arena Nottingham

Game reference

Tyler Beskorowany
Goalies
Adam Morrison
Referees:
Matt Rose
Dean Smith
Linesmen:
Nathan Carmichael
Ilia Kisil

Mark Cooper (1) – 14:22	1–0
Mark Cooper (2) – 21:03	2–0
Mark Cooper (3) – 28:47	3–0
Jordan Boucher (1) – 37:33	4–0
Lewis Hook (1; PPG) – 50:08	5–0
David Goodwin (1; PPG) – 58:02	6–0

4 min
Penalties
8 min
19
Shots
24

30 April 2022; 19:00	Cardiff Devils	3–2 (1–0, 1–0, 1–2)	Guildford Flames	Motorpoint Arena Nottingham

Game reference

Mac Carruth
Goalies
Kevin Lindskoug
Referees:
Matt Thompson
Stefan Hogarth
Linesmen:
Lee Young
Scott Rodger

Jake Coughler (2) – 12:45	1–0
Cole Sanford (2) – 39:30	2–0
	2–1	41:43 – Turner Ripplinger (3)
	2–2	55:28 – Turner Ripplinger (4)
Justin Crandall (1; PPG) – 57:42	3–2

6 min
Penalties
4 min
20
Shots
32

=== Third-place match ===
1 May 2022; 13:00	Guildford Flames	7–5 (2–1, 2–1, 3–3)	Dundee Stars	Motorpoint Arena Nottingham

Game reference

Kevin Lindskoug
Goalies
Brython Preece
Referees:
Matt Rose
Stefan Hogarth
Linesmen:
Nathan Carmichael
Scott Rodger

Jordan Cownie (1) – 6:10	1–0
	1–1	8:42 – Philippe Sanche (1)
Kyle Locke (1) – 10:30	2–1
	2–2	21:44 – Sebastian Bengtsson (4)
Jordan Cownie (2) – 32:49	3–2
Ian McNulty (1) – 33:11	4–2
	4–3	42:58 – Charlie Combs (1)
	4–4	48:35 – Connor Sills (1)
	4–5	53:40 – Michael Poirier (1)
Levi Cable (3) – 54:41	5–5
Brett Ferguson (1; PPG) – 58:07	6–5
Owen Griffiths (2; ENG) – 59:15	7–5

2 min
Penalties
4 min
29
Shots
33

=== Final ===
1 May 2022; 17:00	Belfast Giants	3–6 (1–2, 1–1, 1–3)	Cardiff Devils	Motorpoint Arena Nottingham; Attendance: 7,300

Game reference

Tyler Beskorowany
Goalies
Mac Carruth
Referees:
Liam Sewell
Andy Dalton
Linesmen:
Danny Beresford
Ryan Fraley

	0–1	1:44 – Cole Sanford (3)
	0–2	6:01 – Jake Coughler (3; PPG)
Scott Conway (1; PPG) – 8:32	1–2
Ben Lake (1; PPG) – 25:57	2–2
	2–3	39:39 – Stephen Dixon (1)
	2–4	42:13 – Brodie Reid (1; PPG)
Tyler Soy (2) – 49:03	3–4
	3–5	58:09 – Trevor Cox (3; ENG)
	3–6	59:19 – Josh Lammon (1; ENG)

31 min
Penalties
33 min
37
Shots
23
