= Ryan Ginand =

American ice hockey player

- Born: April 1, 1986 (age 40) Milford, Massachusetts, U.S.
- Height: 5 ft 10 in (178 cm)
- Weight: 185 lb (84 kg; 13 st 3 lb)
- Position: Center
- Shot: Left
- Played for: AHL; Albany Devils; Houston Aeros; ECHL; Trenton Devils; Orlando Solar Bears; Gwinnett Gladiators; Europe; Herning IK; WSV Sterzing Broncos; Coventry Blaze
- NHL draft: Undrafted
- Playing career: 2009–2014

Ryan Ginand (born April 1, 1986) is an American former professional ice hockey player.

== Career ==
=== College hockey ===
Ginand attended Northeastern University from 2005 to 2009 where he played NCAA Division I college hockey with the Northeastern Huskies men's ice hockey team, scoring 46 goals and 36 assists in 132 games while earning NCAA All Star accolades.

=== Professional ===
In November 2009, following a contract with Herning Blue Fox of the Danish Elite League, Ginand signed with the Trenton Devils of the ECHL.

On May 8, 2013, after playing in the New Jersey Devils and Minnesota Wild organizations, Ginand signed as a free agent in Italy for a one-year contract then with a British club, the Coventry Blaze of the EIHL, on a one-year contract.

== Personal life ==
His younger brother, Phil Ginand, played 11 games with the Bridgeport Sound Tigers in the AHL during the 2010–11 season.

== Career statistics ==
| | | | Regular season | | | | | Playoffs |
| Season | Team | League | GP | G | A | Pts | PIM | GP | G | A | Pts | PIM |
|---|---|---|---|---|---|---|---|---|---|---|---|---|
| 2005–06 | Northeastern University | NCAA | 27 | 10 | 6 | 16 | 68 | — | — | — | — | — |
| 2006–07 | Northeastern University | NCAA | 29 | 6 | 8 | 14 | 14 | — | — | — | — | — |
| 2007–08 | Northeastern University | NCAA | 37 | 10 | 10 | 20 | 8 | — | — | — | — | — |
| 2008–09 | Northeastern University | NCAA | 39 | 20 | 12 | 32 | 36 | — | — | — | — | — |
| 2009–10 | Herning Blue Fox | Denmark | 10 | 4 | 3 | 7 | 14 | — | — | — | — | — |
| 2009–10 | Trenton Devils | ECHL | 40 | 14 | 13 | 27 | 18 | — | — | — | — | — |
| 2010–11 | Trenton Devils | ECHL | 68 | 29 | 46 | 75 | 54 | — | — | — | — | — |
| 2010–11 | Albany Devils | AHL | 8 | 2 | 6 | 8 | 6 | — | — | — | — | — |
| 2011–12 | WSV Sterzing Broncos | Italy | 44 | 27 | 24 | 51 | 72 | — | — | — | — | — |
| 2012–13 | Orlando Solar Bears | ECHL | 28 | 7 | 15 | 22 | 20 | — | — | — | — | — |
| 2012–13 | Houston Aeros | AHL | 7 | 0 | 0 | 0 | 8 | — | — | — | — | — |
| 2012–13 | Gwinnett Gladiators | ECHL | 7 | 0 | 3 | 3 | 2 | 8 | 3 | 5 | 8 | 2 |
| 2013–14 | Coventry Blaze | EIHL | 52 | 43 | 42 | 85 | 101 | 2 | 0 | 2 | 2 | 0 |
| AHL totals | | | 15 | 2 | 6 | 8 | 14 | — | — | — | — | — |
| ECHL totals | | | 143 | 50 | 77 | 127 | 94 | 8 | 3 | 5 | 8 | 2 |

== Awards and honors ==
| Award | Year |
|---|---|
| All-Hockey East Second Team | 2008–09 |
| EIHL Most Goals (51) | 2013–14 |
| EIHL Most Points (97) | 2013–14 |
| EIHL All-Star First Team | 2013–14 |
| EIHL Forward of the Year | 2013–14 |
| IHJUK First All-Star Team | 2013–14 |
