= Manchester Storm (2015) =

Ice hockey team in Manchester, England

- City: Manchester, England
- League: Elite Ice Hockey League
- Founded: 2015
- Home arena: AO Arena (capacity: 21,000)
- Colours: White, purple, black, yellow
- Owners: Gord Simmonds & Ryan Finnerty
- General manager: Ryan Finnerty
- Head coach: Cameron Critchlow
- Captain: Chase Harrison
- Affiliates: Deeside Dragons, NIHL 1 & Hull Seahawks, National Ice Hockey League
- Website: www.manchesterstorm.com
Home colours	Away colours	Third colours

The Manchester Storm are a British professional ice hockey team founded in 2015. They are members of the Elite Ice Hockey League and are based at AO Arena.

== History ==
The original Manchester Storm team were founded in 1995 and were owned by the operators of the newly opened Manchester Arena. The Storm won the First Division championship in their inaugural season, before becoming a founding member of the Ice Hockey Superleague in 1996. The Storm won the league championship in the 1998–99 season, before capturing the Autumn Cup the following season. The Storm drew large crowds, breaking the British attendance record with a match against the Sheffield Steelers during the 1996–97 season. Manchester Storm was sold to Manchester businessman Gary Cowan, who ran the team during a period of financial challenges for members of the league, until the league itself was folded, in 2002.

The Manchester Phoenix were formed in 2003. They were founder members of the Elite Ice Hockey League (EIHL), but moved to the English Premier League in 2009 for financial reasons. Initially playing out of the Manchester Arena, the Phoenix would eventually relocate to the Altrincham Ice Dome.

At the end of the 2014–15 season, a legal dispute arose between the management of the Altrincham Ice Dome and the Phoenix team over alleged financial impropriety regarding junior teams at the venue. Around the same time, the Hull Stingrays of the Elite Ice Hockey League withdrew from the EIHL. The management of the Altrincham Ice Dome and the EIHL subsequently reached an agreement to place a team in Altrincham to fill the gap created by Hull's liquidation. This team was to be the new Manchester Storm.

=== First season (2015–16) ===
The side lining up facing the Nottingham Panthers for the national anthem during the Storm's first competitive match.

On 26 June 2015, the Storm announced their first two pre-season games against the Nottingham Panthers and old rivals the Sheffield Steelers. Owner Mark Johnson posted via Twitter saying fans wearing original jerseys to the matches from the previous Manchester Storm team would be rewarded with something to take home. On the same day it was made public that the newly formed Storm had signed their first two players: Team GB defenceman Dave Phillips and Matty Davies, who would both play in the coming season.

The Storm competed in their first match on 29 August 2015 in a friendly against the Nottingham Panthers. The Manchester side led by then GM, Neil Russell, previously with the Belfast Giants, came away victors with a 5–4 win after a penalty shootout with the first goal scored by the newly formed side coming from forward Vinny Scarsella. Despite the side taking a win, behind the scenes the Storm had yet to recruit a full team and were plagued with other issues such as waiting on signed imports to arrive in the UK as well as visas to be approved.

The following evening the Storm played away in another friendly against the 2014–15 EPIHL champions the Peterborough Phantoms. The Storm won again with a 7–3 victory with four goals coming from Manchester Storm forward Vinny Scarsella.

The first competitive league match took place on Saturday 5 September 2015. The Storm hosted Scottish side the Edinburgh Capitals. The game ended with the Storm winning 8–1 including a hat-trick by Luke Salazar.

On Sunday 7 February 2016, the Storm set a league record in an away league match against the Edinburgh Capitals. The game ended in a 13–9 win for the Manchester side making it the highest scoring league game on record.

During the course of the season several players such as Gal Koren, Jamie Chilcott and Matt Caria departed from Manchester due to varying reasons. This, however, led to the signings of players such as Devin DiDiomete, locally-born Paul Swindlehurst and Derek Roehl who would all help bring a different dynamic to the team as opposed to player-coach Omar Pacha's idea of a squad built on speed. The Storm narrowly missed out on making the 2015–2016 playoffs finishing 9th in the league above last-placed Edinburgh Capitals.

=== Second season (2016–17) ===
The Manchester-side announced two signings following the end of the regular season: player-coach Omar Pacha re-signed for the following 2016–17 season and Team GB newcomer Jack Prince would also help add to the side coming straight from a four-year stint of NCAA ice hockey for the University of Alabama–Huntsville. Returning players included defensemen Paul Phillips and Paul Swindlehurst along with forward Patrik Valcak.

The club made the play-offs for the first time since their formation finishing in 8th but coach Omar Pacha would leave at the end of the 2016–17 season, later replacing Marc Lefebvre as Dundee Stars head coach in July 2017. Following Pacha in leaving the club in the summer of 2017 were Adam Harding and Taylor Dickin, who both joined the Dundee Stars – though both moved to Tayside before Pacha was appointed coach.

Elsewhere, Mark Heatley also left soon after the season's end, while Cody Cartier moved to the Ligue Magnus to sign for Gap. Fellow forward Mario Valery-Trabucco also headed to France to sign for Ligue Magnus side Gothiques d'Amiens.

Following Trabucco out of the Storm Shelter was American defenceman Paul Phillips who moved to Milton Keynes Lightning after two years in Manchester, while forward Jack Prince announced his retirement after a season with the Storm. Fellow defenceman Connor Varley also moved to France to sign for Gamyo d'Épinal.

=== Third season (2017–18) ===
The club parted company with player/coach Omar Pacha after two years in the role. Following a takeover by a group led by businessmen Jamie Tunstall and Gordon Greig, the club appointed Ryan Finnerty as their new coach in May 2017. Finnerty had departed Braehead Clan at the end of the 2016/17 season and had previously coached the Sheffield Steelers.

His first act was to sign former NHLer Jay Rosehill who followed Finnerty to Manchester from Braehead. The signings continued as defenceman Dallas Ehrhardt and netminder Mike Clemente committed for a second season, before news that the Storm had signed former NHL forward Dane Byers and a former Colorado Avalanche draft pick in forward Luke Moffatt. Recruitment continued with the signing of young English defenceman Declan Balmer and forward Ciaran Long, both from Basingstoke Bison in June 2017.

Ahead of the 2017–18 season, the club confirmed a partnership with Hull Pirates to enable U23 players from the Pirates to step up to Elite League level on two-way contracts. The first player to sign was goaltender Ashley Smith who arrived as the back-up to Mike Clemente on 21 June 2017.

Finnerty continued his recruitment drive by re-signing centre Matt Bissonnette for a second season and then by capturing Canadian forward Mike Hammond from Braehead Clan on 26 June 2017. Then, on 30 June 2017, Manchester strengthened their defensive corps with the arrival of American defenceman Ryan Trenz from ECHL side Alaska Aces, while Swedish winger Gerard Hanson arrived from Northern Michigan University.

On 14 July 2017, Storm coach Finnerty completed the signing of what he termed his "top target" in capturing Matt Beca from his former side Braehead Clan. Beca joined former Clan teammates Rosehill and Hammond at the Storm Shelter after putting up 83 points in 62 league and cup games during the 2016/17 season.

Five days later, the Storm made their 15th signing ahead of the new season with the arrival of 29-year-old Canadian centre Chris Auger from ECHL side Brampton Beast. Auger had first come to the attention of Finnerty while playing a solitary season (2014–15) with the Fife Flyers. On 24 July 2017, the forward lines were completed with the acquisition of 29-year-old Canadian centre Shane Bakker from the Atlanta Gladiators of the ECHL.

The Storm added to their defensive unit with the acquisition of 27-year-old Canadian Matt Stanisz from ECHL side Elmira Jackals on 7 August 2017. On 9 August 2017, the Storm added fellow Canadian defenceman, 22-year-old Linden Springer from Lakehead University.

On 11 August 2017, Manchester completed their roster with the signing of 28-year-old Canadian defenceman/centre Nate Fleming. Despite Fleming sitting out the 2016/17 season, Storm coach Finnerty was pleased to sign the former Edinburgh Capitals defenceman.

After an injury to centre Chris Auger that ruled the Canadian out of action for the foreseeable future in October 2017, Finnerty snapped up Canadian centre Scott Pitt from MsHK Zilina, reuniting him with his former coach and three former Braehead Clan teammates. Pitt had played under Finnerty at Braehead for three seasons.

The first game of the season saw Storm lose on the road to Finnerty's formed club, before they got their revenge in the return fixture the following night. From there, things continued to build for Storm and for the first two months of the season remained in the top three places in the league. Whilst the club's fortunes in the Challenge Cup didn't favour as well as those in the league, the momentum was building.

Storm suffered a few defeats throughout December and January and with other teams catching up with fixtures saw themselves slowly drop down the table to seventh place, however the Storm's home record continued to do the club proud.

The end of January saw Storm start a run of ten games unbeaten, including the first league win against the Sheffield Steelers since reforming, which helped to move the club back up the table. On 18 February, with over a month of the regular season remaining, Storm clinched their spot in the playoffs.

As the results began to mount in Storm's favour, so did the attendances. By the end of the season Storm had sold out more games than the previous two seasons combined, including the final five games of the season. Storm ended the season in the runners up position, behind the Cardiff Devils who retained their title, and winners of the newly created Patton Conference.

The playoffs were a disappointment, with a stunning 4–1 victory away at the Fife Flyers followed by a disappointing 1–4 home defeat the following evening, with the Flyers securing the victory in overtime.

=== Fourth season (2018–19) ===
After so much success in the previous season, it was a difficult year for the Storm, starting in the summer with the departures of some of the key members of the squad. Matt Beca and Scott Pitt returned to Glasgow, while Matt Stanisz and Gerard Hanson followed them, and Paul Swindlehurst departed to join the Belfast Giants. One of the biggest losses came after netminder Mike Clemente retired after two seasons. Clemente was a fan favourite and proved to be one of the best goaltenders in the league. Matt Ginn did a stellar job coming into the squad to replace him, ending the year with a 90.9% save percentage, the fourth most among regular goaltenders across the league.

In just his second year in the league, British forward Ciaran Long had one of the greatest recent seasons of any domestic player in the league. Following up his debut season where he posted 35 points, Long almost doubled his production, ending the year with 60 points in as many games.

While the team may have been towards the bottom of the standings, Mike Hammond was again Manchester's best player, with a league leading 57 assists alongside 18 goals. Captain Dane Byers put in a true "lead by example" season, leading the team with 29 goals while also racking up a league high 182 penalty minutes.

Things didn't get off to the best start, with Storm picking up just four wins in their opening ten games, and these struggles continued throughout the campaign. At the turn of the New Year there was some hope as the Storm looked to mount a climb up the table, picking up five straight wins in January, but a string of up and down performances for the rest of the campaign saw them as the final team eliminated from playoff contention in the final weekend of the regular season, despite having the third best home ice record in the league.

Penalty trouble saw the Storm suffer, with four players ending the year with over 100 penalty minutes as Harrison Ruopp, Shane Bakker, Linden Springer and Dane Byers combined for just shy of 600 penalty minutes.

=== Pandemic Era (2019–2021) ===
The COVID-19 pandemic saw the 2019–20 EIHL season brought to a premature close in 2020, with only the Challenge Cup seeing a winner crowned, following Sheffield's victory over Cardiff in the final.

The 2020–21 EIHL season was cancelled completely due to ongoing social distancing restrictions related to the COVID-19 pandemic, but Manchester were named as one of four English EIHL sides taking part in the 2021 'Elite Series' between April and May 2021.

The 2021–22 EIHL season went ahead as scheduled, with the Belfast Giants winning their fifth league title. Manchester missed the play-offs following a 9th-place finish. In April 2022 following the conclusion of the season, head coach Ryan Finnerty stood down after five years in charge to focus solely on his responsibilities as General Manager.

=== Post-pandemic Era (2021–2026) ===
In May 2022, Manchester confirmed the appointment of Matt Ginn as the team's head coach on a two-year deal beginning from the 2022–23 Elite League season. Ginn, the Storm's former starting netminder, retired from playing to take up the role having also previously served as an assistant coach to Ryan Finnerty, becoming the third coach in franchise history.

On 1 January 2023, Manchester Storm announced automation company Robiquity had signed on as title partners through to the end of the 2024–25 season.

In Ginn's first season behind the bench, Manchester finished the 2022–23 campaign in 6th place, collecting 48 points from 54 matches and posting a 22-28-4 record. The Storm would exit at the play-off quarter-final stage, losing their two-legged tie against the Sheffield Steelers by an aggregate score of 7–4.

In the 2023–24 season, Manchester finished in 4th position with a 27-20-7 record, good for 61 points. The Storm lost their play-off quarter-final to the Guildford Flames and their Challenge Cup quarter-final to the Sheffield Steelers. Manchester's performance saw Ginn named the EIHL Coach of the Year.

However, in May 2024 Ginn departed Manchester after accepting an opportunity in North America.

The club quickly moved to appoint Canadian Mike Flanagan as the Storm's new head coach. He arrived from Austrian side EK Zeller Eisbären.

However, Flanagan was relieved of his duties as Storm head coach on 3 December 2024, with assistant coach Mike Morin taking on the role of interim head coach.

After the season, former captain Cameron Critchlow retired from playing and in May 2025 became the Storm's fifth permanent head coach in team history. Mike Morin returned to his previous role as Assistant Coach.

In the 2025–26 season, the Manchester Storm progressed to the EIHL Playoff Weekend in Nottingham for the first time since this iteration of the team was founded.

On 24th April 2026 Planet Ice announced it would not be issuing a licence for Manchester Storm to continue operations at Planet Ice Altrincham for the 2026/27 season.

=== Arena Era (2026–) ===
In April 2026, Manchester Storm confirmed that they would be re-signing head coach Cameron Critchlow and be moving back to the AO Arena in Manchester for the first time since 2002.

== Season-by-season records ==
Season	Regular Season						Play Offs	Challenge Cup	Head Coach
Season	Finish	Played	Wins	Losses	OT Losses	Points	Play Offs	Challenge Cup	Head Coach
Manchester Storm
2015–16	9th	52	20	28	4	44	Did not qualify	Group Stage	Omar Pacha
2016–17	8th	52	18	26	8	44	Quarter-finals	Group Stage	Omar Pacha
2017–18	2nd	56	35	16	5	75	Quarter-finals	Group Stage	Ryan Finnerty
2018–19	9th	60	27	28	5	59	Did not qualify	Quarter-finals	Ryan Finnerty
2019–20^{†}	8th	49	18	26	5	41	Cancelled	Quarter-finals	Ryan Finnerty
2020–21^{††}	N/A	Cancelled	Cancelled	Cancelled	Cancelled	Cancelled	Cancelled	Cancelled	Ryan Finnerty
2021–22	9th	54	18	32	4	40	Did not qualify	Group Stage	Ryan Finnerty
2022–23	6th	54	22	28	4	48	Quarter-finals	Group Stage	Matt Ginn
2023–24	4th	54	27	20	7	61	Quarter-finals	Quarter-finals	Matt Ginn
2024–25	9th	54	22	29	3	47	Did not qualify	Group Stage	Mike Flanagan / Mike Morin
2025-26	6th	54	26	19	9	61	Semi-Finals	Group Stage	Cameron Critchlow

^{†} Note: the 2019–20 season was cancelled due to the COVID-19 coronavirus. The table shows the standings at the point of cancellation. No champion was crowned and the play-offs were also cancelled.

^{††} Note: the 2020–21 Elite League season – originally scheduled for a revised start date of 5 December – was suspended on 15 September 2020, because of ongoing coronavirus pandemic restrictions. The EIHL board determined that the season was non-viable without supporters being permitted to attend matches and unanimously agreed to a suspension. The season was cancelled completely in February 2021. Manchester were later announced as one of four Elite League teams taking part in the 'Elite Series' between April–May 2021, a total of 24 games culminating in a best-of-three play-off final series.

== Honours ==
EIHL Patton Conference champions

- 2017–18

Individual

- EIHL All-Stars

First Team Elite Prospects – Award – EIHL All-Star First Team

- 2017–18: Mike Hammond
- 2024–25: Alexis D'Aoust
- 2025–26: Drew DeRidder

Second Team Elite Prospects – Award – EIHL All-Star Second Team

- 2015–16: Paul Phillips, Mathew Sisca
- 2017–18: Luke Moffatt
- 2019–20: Matt Ginn
- 2023–24: Evan Weninger
- 2025–26:Nicholas Welsh

== Current squad ==
Squad for 2026-27 Elite League season

- * Denotes three-way deal with Hull Seahawks and Deeside Dragons
- ** Denotes two-way deal with Hull Seahawks
- *** Denotes two-way deal with Deeside Dragons

Netminders
No.		Player	Catches	Acquired	Place of Birth	Joined from	Press Release
35	(Canada)	Evan Weninger	L	2023	Saskatoon, Canada	Aigles de Nice, Ligue Magnus
42	(England) (Sweden)	Tyler de la Bertouche**	L	2025	London, England	Deeside Dragons, NIHL 1
44	(United States)	Drew DeRidder	L	2025	Fenton, United States	Atlanta Gladiators, ECHL

Defencemen
No.		Player	Shoots	Acquired	Place of Birth	Joined from	Press Release
4	(Canada)	Dennis Busby	R	2025	Barrie, Canada	Adirondack Thunder, ECHL
5	(Canada)	Kyle Locke	R	2025	Aurora, Canada	Guildford Flames, EIHL
6	(Canada)	Chase Harrison C	L	2022	Winnipeg, Canada	Rapid City Rush, ECHL
7	(Canada)	Brendon Clavelle	L	2025	Kapuskasing, Canada	Laval Rocket, AHL
8	(England)	Bradley Jenion	L	2025	Macclesfield, England	Macon Mayhem, SPHL
10	(Canada) (United Kingdom)	Dallas Ehrhardt	L	2016	Calgary, Canada	Ducs de Dijon, Ligue Magnus
17	(England) (Finland)	Noah Kaariainen**	R	2024	England	Blackburn Hawks, NIHL 1
24	(England)	Bailey Thomas*	L	2026	England	Milton Keynes Lightning, NIHL
90	(Canada)	Drydn Dow A	L	2026	Calgary, Canada	Dundee Stars, EIHL

Forwards
No.		Player	Position	Acquired	Place of Birth	Joined from	Press Release
9	(Canada)	Kyle Maksimovich	LW/RW	2026	Hamilton, Canada	Herning Blue Fox, Metal Ligaen
12	(Canada)	Stephen Johnson A	F	2022	Moncton, Canada	Wichita Thunder, ECHL
13	(Canada)	Joseph Nardi	C/LW	2025	Edmonton, Canada	Reading Royals, ECHL
14	(Canada)	Loren Ulett A	C/LW	2023	Port Perry, Canada	Kansas City Mavericks, ECHL
19	(Canada)	Brady Gilmour	C	2025	Cobourg, Canada	EHC Freiburg, DEL2
20	(England)	Josh Crawley**	F	2024	Manchester, England	Blackburn Hawks, NIHL 1
23	(Canada)	Tim McGauley	C	2026	Wilcox, Canada	Eispiraten Crimmitschau, DEL2
29	(Canada)	Brandon Cutler	LW	2025	Spruce Grove, Canada	EC Kassel Huskies, DEL2
34	(England)	Theo Malone***	F	2025	Manchester, England	HC Energie Karlovy Vary U17s, Czechia U17 2
71	(England)	Connor Lee	F	2026	Manchester, England	Spruce Grove Saints, BCHL
74	(England)	Rais Francis	LW/C	2025	Nottingham, England	Salem State Vikings, NCAA Division III
79	(United States)	J.D. Dudek	C	2025	Auburn, United States	Worcester Railers, ECHL
88	(England)	Lewis Hook	LW/RW	2026	Peterborough, England	Guildford Flames, EIHL
93	(Canada)	David Morley	C/RW	2026	Richmond Hill, Canada	Eisbären Regensburg, DEL2
96	(Sweden)	Anton Karlsson	W/C	2026	Lerum, Sweden	Fife Flyers, EIHL

Team Staff
No.		Name	Position	Place of Birth	Joined from	Press Release
N/A	(Canada) (United Kingdom)	Cameron Critchlow	Head Coach	Summerside, Canada	Appointed in 2025
N/A	(Canada) (United Kingdom)	Mike Morin	Assistant coach	Melville, Canada	Appointed in 2015
10	(Canada) (United Kingdom)	Dallas Ehrhardt	Player/Assistant coach	Calgary, Canada	Ducs de Dijon, Ligue Magnus
N/A	(Canada)	Ryan Finnerty	General Manager	Lethbridge, Canada	Braehead Clan, EIHL
N/A	(England)	James McCall	Conditioning coach	England	Appointed in 2018
N/A	(England)	Russ Herring	Equipment manager	England	Appointed in 2025
N/A	(England)	Jonathan Homer	Analyst	Manchester, England	Appointed in 2017

Recent departures
No.		Player	Position	Acquired	Leaving For	Press Release
9	(Canada)	Tyler Hinam	RW	2023	Gothiques d'Amiens, Ligue Magnus
18	(Canada)	Kaleb Ergang	RW	2025	Trois-Rivières Lions, ECHL
21	(England) (United Kingdom)	Zach Sullivan	D	2021	Leeds Knights, NIHL
23	(Canada)	Gary Haden	C/LW	2025	Dundee Stars, EIHL
47	(Canada)	Patrick Kudla	D	2026	Greensboro Gargoyles, ECHL
77	(Canada)	Nicholas Welsh	D	2025	Cardiff Devils, EIHL
84	(Canada)	Harrison Caines	LW/C	2025	Diables Rouges de Briançon, Ligue Magnus
86	(Canada) (Italy)	Dante Hannoun	C/RW	2025	Milano Hockey Club, ICEHL
94	(Germany) (England)	Jace Gledhill	G	2025	Deeside Dragons, NIHL 1

== Retired numbers ==
The club has retired three shirt numbers. Brad Rubachuk's number 41 was originally retired in September 1999, and the honour was repeated, following the relaunch of the team, in February 2017. This was followed by Mike Morin's number 15 which was retired in November 2017. In addition, the club announced in May 2018 that it would be retiring the number 22 shirt in honour of the victims of the Manchester Arena bombing.

== Notable former players ==
Former players
Number	Player	Place/Date of Birth	Position	Acquired	Released	Notes
13	David Phillips	Beverley, England; 14 August 1987 (age 39)	D	2015	2016	GB international with over 100 caps
24	Devin DiDiomete	(Italy) Stratford, Ontario, Canada; 9 May 1988 (age 38)	LW	2015	2016	Drafted by Calgary Flames 2006
22	Mathew Sisca	(Italy) Woodbridge, Ontario, Canada; 30 October 1990 (age 36)	C/LW	2015	2016	Top points scorer 2015–16
2	Omar Pacha	Boucherville, Quebec, Canada; 18 November 1986 (age 39)	D	2015	2017	Player-coach 2015–16 and 2016–17
81	Patrik Valcak	Ostrava, Czech Republic; 16 December 1984 (age 41)	C	2015	2017	Drafted by Boston Bruins in 2003
44	Trevor Johnson C	(Italy) Trail, British Columbia, Canada; 25 January 1982 (age 44)	D	2016	2017	Italy international with over 90 caps
26	Darian Dziurzynski	Lloydminster, Alberta, Canada; 30 March 1991 (age 35)	LW	2016	2017	Top points scorer in 2016–17; drafted by Phoenix Coyotes in 2011
29	Eric Neilson	Fredericton, New Brunswick, Canada; 18 August 1984 (age 42)	RW	2016	2017	Drafted by Los Angeles Kings in 2004
23	Paul Swindlehurst	Blackrod, Bolton, England; 25 May 1993 (age 33)	D	2016	2018	GB international with over 20 caps
37	Jay Rosehill C	Olds, Alberta, Canada; 16 July 1985 (age 41)	LW	2017	2018	Drafted by Tampa Bay Lightning in 2003; 117 appearances in the National Hockey League
34	Dane Byers C	Nipawin, Saskatchewan, Canada; 21 February 1986 (age 40)	LW/RW	2017	2019	Drafted by New York Rangers in 2004; 564 appearances in the American Hockey League
21	Mike Hammond	(United Kingdom) (Canada) Brighton, England	C	2017	2019	Club record goals, assists and points scorer; GB international
9	Luke Moffatt	(Canada) Paradise Valley, Arizona, United States; 11 June 1992 (age 34)	RW	2017	2019	Drafted by Colorado Avalanche in 2010
61	Chris Auger	Belleville, Ontario, Canada; 16 December 1987 (age 38)	C	2017	2019	Drafted by Chicago Blackhawks in 2006
89	Ciaran Long	Birmingham, England; 9 February 1991 (age 35)	RW	2017	2019	Elite League British Player of the Year 2018–19.
