= List of EIHL seasons =

This is a list of Elite Ice Hockey League seasons since its inception:

2003–04 | 2004–05 | 2005–06 | 2006–07 | 2007–08 | 2008–09 | 2009–09 | 2010–09 | 2011–12 | 2012–13 | 2013–14 | 2014–15 | 2015–16 | 2016–17 | 2017–18 | 2018-19 | 2019-20 | 2021-22 | 2022-23 | 2023-24 | 2024-25 | 2025-26 | 2026-27 |
