= Gal Koren =

Slovenian ice hockey player

- Born: January 16, 1992 (age 33) Domžale, Slovenia
- Height: 6 ft 0 in (183 cm)
- Weight: 185 lb (84 kg; 13 st 3 lb)
- Position: Centre
- Shot: Left
- Played for: KHL Medveščak Zagreb; HDD Olimpija Ljubljana; HKm Zvolen; Manchester Storm; HK Olimpija
- National team: Slovenia
- NHL draft: Undrafted
- Playing career: 2010–2021

Gal Koren (born January 16, 1992) is a retired Slovenian professional ice hockey player.

Koren competed at the 2013 IIHF World Championship as a member of the Slovenia men's national ice hockey team.
