= Dundee Stars =

Ice hockey club in Dundee, Scotland

- City: Dundee, Scotland
- League: Elite Ice Hockey League
- Founded: 2001
- Home arena: Dundee Ice Arena (capacity: 2,700)
- Colours: Navy blue, red, white
- Owner: Michael O'Rourke
- General manager: Mike Ward
- Head coach: Scott Dutertre
- Captain: Travis Ewanyk
- Affiliates: Dundee Rockets, SNL
- Website: dundeestars.com
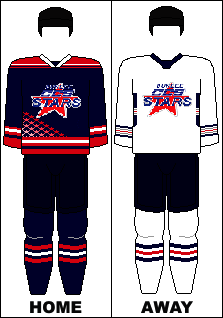

Franchise history
- 2001–2008: Dundee 'Texol' Stars
- 2008–2017: Dundee 'CCS' Stars
- 2018–2022: 'Kitmart' Dundee Stars
- 2022–2025: 'Trade-Mart' Dundee Stars
- 2025–: 'MKM' Dundee Stars

Championships
- Regular season titles: 2001–02
- Conference titles: 2013–14
- Playoff championships: 2001–02, 2004–05

The Dundee Stars (Note: Known officially as the MKM Dundee Stars for sponsorship reasons.) are a professional ice hockey team based in Dundee, Scotland. Founded in 2001, the team plays its home games at the Dundee Ice Arena.

The Stars currently compete in the Elite Ice Hockey League (EIHL), the top tier of ice hockey in the United Kingdom. Before joining the EIHL, the franchise competed in several other competitions, including the British National League (BNL), the Scottish National League (SNL), and the Northern League. They are one of three Scottish clubs in the Elite League, alongside the Glasgow Clan and the Fife Flyers.

== BNL years ==
Founded in 2001, the Dundee Stars won the Findus British National League (FBNL) and the Playoffs in their first season (2001–02) and then ranked 2nd in the FBNL 9n (2002–03), topped their playoff group and reached the semi-finals of the challenge cup the following season. Stars' third season was a disappointment compared to the previous two, with a low league position and a place in the final of the Capital Cup.

Season 2004–05 started off disappointing for all three Scottish teams in the BNL. The National Cup, the Keyline Cup and the Challenge Cup were no better. However, the Stars turned their season around after making a few changes to the roster and won the Playoffs and also fared well in the Caledonia Cup.

== Post BNL years: SNL ==
In 2005 Edinburgh Capitals and Newcastle Vipers decided to resign from the BNL in order to join the premier Elite League. As this would leave the BNL with only five teams; and thus with little option but to fold, the Capitals and Vipers temporarily withdrew their applications so as to allow the remaining BNL teams to apply for EIHL status. However, terms could not be agreed between the EIHL and the remaining five BNL teams; leading the Capitals and Vipers to resubmit their original applications and join the EIHL; which ultimately resulted in the closure of the BNL. This led the Stars, along with fellow former BNL team Fife Flyers, to move to the Scottish National League. The Stars refusal of the EIHL's terms was due to their local rival, Fife Flyers, being unable to join the EIHL due to their arena not meeting the EIHL's standards. It was decided that Stars' would not join the EIHL at that time unless the Flyers were allowed to join with them. In joining the SNL the Stars had to release all of their imported players in order to meet SNL rules.

During the first season, Fife won the SNL with Stars three points behind in 2nd. Flyers also won the Autumn Cup, the Northern League and the SNL Playoffs. Season 2006–07 introduced the NHL style Zero Tolerance rules and the one import rule with the intent of making the SNL a more skillful league. The Stars have relied heavily on their junior development with many under-19s and some under-16s "playing up" as well as managing to secure the services of two of the "old" favourites, Jeff Marshall (Canada) and Patric Lochi (Italy).

== EIHL years ==
In late April 2010, the Dundee Stars confirmed that they had been accepted into the EIHL, as the league's 2nd expansion team for the 2010–11 season.

In February 2026, the Ward family - who established the club in 2001 and had run it for 25 years - announced they were selling the club to Glasgow Clan owner Michael O'Rourke and partners. The sale will be officially confirmed at the end of the 2025–26 season, with the Ward family remaining involved behind the scenes.

On 6 May 2026, the Dundee Stars rebranded their primary logo and also introduced a secondary wordmark.

== Elite Ice Hockey League record ==
Season	League		Conference		Playoff	Challenge Cup
2010–11	EIHL	8th			QF	Group
2011–12	EIHL	8th			QF	Group
2012–13	EIHL	9th	Gardiner	3rd	DNQ	QF
2013–14	EIHL	3rd	Gardiner	1st	QF	QF
2014–15	EIHL	10th	Gardiner	5th	DNQ	QF
2015–16	EIHL	7th	Gardiner	3rd	QF	QF
2016–17	EIHL	7th	Gardiner	2nd	SF	QF
2017–18	EIHL	10th	Gardiner	3rd	DNQ	QF
2018–19	EIHL	10th	Gardiner	2nd	DNQ	QF
2019–20^{†}	EIHL	9th			Cancelled	QF
2020–21^{††}	EIHL	Cancelled	Cancelled		Cancelled	Cancelled
2021–22	EIHL	7th			SF	QF
2022–23	EIHL	10th			DNQ	QF
2023–24	EIHL	7th			QF	Group
2024–25	EIHL	8th			QF	Group
2025–26	EIHL	9th			DNQ	Group

^{†} Note: The 2019–20 Elite League season was cancelled completely in March 2020, owing to the coronavirus pandemic. The season finished without a league or play-off winner and Dundee's stat line above reflects the Stars' position at the time of the cancellation.

^{††} Note: The 2020–21 Elite League season - originally scheduled for a revised start date of 5 December - was suspended on 15 September 2020, because of ongoing coronavirus pandemic restrictions. The EIHL board determined that the season was non-viable without supporters being permitted to attend matches and unanimously agreed to a suspension. The season was cancelled completely in February 2021.

== Head coach history ==
Name	Nationality	Tenure
Tony Hand	(Scotland)	2001–2003
Roger Hunt	(Canada)	2003–2009
Iain Robertson	(Scotland)	2009–2010
Dan Ceman	(Canada)	2010–2011
Brent Hughes	(Canada) (United Kingdom)	2011–2012
Jeff Hutchins	(Canada) (United Kingdom)	2012–2015
Marc LeFebvre	(Canada) (United Kingdom)	2015–2017
Omar Pacha	(Canada)	2017–2022
Jeff Mason	(United States)	2022–2023
Marc LeFebvre	(Canada) (United Kingdom)	2023–2026
Scott Dutertre	(Canada)	2026–Present

== Current squad ==
Squad for 2026–27 Elite League season

- * Denotes two-way deal with Aberdeen Lynx of the SNL
- ** Denotes two-way deal with Solway IHC of the NIHL

Netminders
No.		Player	Catches	Acquired	Place of Birth	Joined from	Press Release
1	(Kazakhstan)	Vladislav Pestov	L	2026	Kazakhstan	Torpedo Ust-Kamenogorsk, Pro Hokei Ligasy
31	(Canada)	Carl Stankowski	L	2026	Calgary, Canada	Calgary Dinos, U Sports
45	(Scotland) (Czech Republic)	Dominick Jaglar	L	2024	Dundee, Scotland	Aberdeen Lynx, SNL

Defencemen
No.		Player	Shoots	Acquired	Place of Birth	Joined from	Press Release
3	(Canada)	Zack Hoffman	R	2026	Toronto, Canada	GKS Katowice, Polska Hokej Liga
4	(Canada)	Sean Strange	L	2026	Saanich, Canada	Rapid City Rush, ECHL
8	(United States)	Duggie Lagrone A	R	2026	Plano, United States	Tulsa Oilers, ECHL
11	(Scotland)	Kris Inglis A	L	2016	Dundee, Scotland	Home Grown
20	(Canada)	Evan Brand	L	2026	Toronto, Canada	Toronto Metro Univ, U Sports
24	(Scotland)	Craig Moore A	R	2023	Kirkcaldy, Scotland	Nottingham Panthers, EIHL

Forwards
No.		Player	Position	Acquired	Place of Birth	Joined from	Press Release
9	(United States) (Canada)	Matt DeBoer	W	2026	Madison, United States	Holy Cross Crusaders, NCAA
12	(Scotland)	Jonathan McBean**	C	2022	Dundee, Scotland	Dundee Comets, SNL
17	(Canada)	Brodi Stuart	C/LW	2026	Langley, Canada	DVTK Jegesmedvék, Erste Liga
18	(Canada)	Keaton Jameson	F	2026	Brandon, Canada	Fife Flyers, EIHL
21	(Sweden)	Sebastian Bengtsson A	LW/RW	2026	Stockholm, Sweden	EC Bad Nauheim, DEL2
22	(Canada) (Germany)	Travis Ewanyk C	C	2026	St. Albert, Canada	EHC Freiburg, DEL2
23	(Canada)	Gary Haden A	C	2026	Airdrie, Canada	Manchester Storm, EIHL
26	(United States)	Josh Nelson	C/LW	2026	Lockport, United States	Tulsa Oilers, ECHL
57	(Scotland)	Jaydn Baxter*	F	2025	Dundee, Scotland	Aberdeen Lynx, SNL
73	(Finland)	Rasmus Nousiainen	F	2026	Turku, Finland	HC Merano, AlpsHL
77	(Finland)	Maxim Eliseev	RW	2026	Helsinki, Finland	EC Red Bull Salzburg Juniors, AlpsHL
82	(Canada)	Tyson Laventure	RW	2026	Lloydminster, Canada	Alberta Golden Bears, U Sports
93	(Scotland)	Ben Brown	F/D	2026	Dundee, Scotland	Fife Flyers, EIHL

Team Staff
No.		Name	Position	Place of Birth	Joined from	Press Release
N/A	(Canada)	Scott Dutertre	Head coach / Director of Hockey Operations	Canada	Tulsa Oilers, ECHL
N/A	(Canada)	Brad Herauf	Assistant Coach	Regina, Canada	Regina Pats, WHL
N/A	(Scotland)	Mike Ward	Head of Operations	Dundee, Scotland	Appointed in 2001
N/A	(Scotland)	Kevin Ward	Equipment manager	Dundee, Scotland	Appointed in 2010
N/A	(Scotland)	Chris Ward	Assistant equipment manager	Dundee, Scotland	Appointed in 2015

Recent departures
No.		Player	Position	Acquired	Leaving For	Press Release
6	(Canada)	Drydn Dow C	D	2021	Manchester Storm, EIHL
8	(United States)	Spencer Naas A	LW/C	2024	Nottingham Panthers, EIHL
10	(Canada)	Kameron Kielly	RW/C	2024	KSW IceFighters Leipzig, Oberliga
15	(Scotland)	Craig Garrigan	LW	2021	Dundee Rockets, SNL
16	(United States)	Ben Almquist	F	2025	TBC
17	(Scotland)	Rio Page	F	2025	Dundee Rockets, SNL
20	(United States)	Keanu Yamamoto	RW	2024	Diables Rouges de Briançon, Ligue Magnus
22	(Canada)	Brad Schoonbaert	F	2025	TBC
26	(Canada)	Justin Bean	D	2025	South Carolina Stingrays, ECHL
27	(United States) (Canada)	Jackson Desouza	D	2025	Indy Fuel, ECHL
28	(Canada)	Matt Boudens A	C	2025	Fredericton Express, LHSB
33	(United States)	Jarrett Fiske	G	2024	Wipptal Broncos, AlpsHL
35	(Sweden)	Emil Kruse	G	2025	TBC
43	(Finland)	Otto Nieminen	LW/RW	2025	Unia Oswiecim, Polska Hokej Liga
44	(United States) (Canada)	Griffin Luce	D	2025	TBC
48	(Canada) (United Kingdom)	Johnny Curran	RW/C	2026	St. Catharines Saints, ACH
54	(Canada)	Powell Connor	D	2026	TBC
71	(Estonia)	Morten Jurgens	C/RW	2025	HC Tigers, Oberliga

== Honours ==
British National League

- League: 2001–02
- Playoffs: 2001–02, 2004–05

Scottish National League

- Autumn Cup: 2009

Elite Ice Hockey League

- Gardiner Conference: 2013–14

Individual

- EIHL All-Stars

First Team

- 2013–14: Dan Bakala
- 2016–17: Vinny Scarsella
- 2024-25: Drydn Dow

Second Team

- 2012–13: Nicola Riopel, Sami Ryhänen
- 2013–14: Rory Rawlyk, Nico Sacchetti
- 2016–17: Felix-Antoine Poulin
- 2019–20: Drydn Dow
- 2021–22: Charlie Combs
- 2023–24: Drydn Dow, Ryan Valentini, Spencer Naas
