= 2013–14 EIHL season =

- League: Elite Ice Hockey League
- Sport: Ice hockey
- Duration: September – March

Regular season
- Champions: Belfast Giants
- Season MVP: Dan Bakala (Dundee Stars)
- Top scorer: Ryan Ginand (Coventry Blaze)

Playoffs
- Champions: Sheffield Steelers

Challenge Cup
- Champions: Nottingham Panthers

EIHL seasons
- 2012–13 2014–15

The 2013–14 Elite Ice Hockey League season was the 11th season of the Elite Ice Hockey League. The regular season (the primary competition in UK ice hockey) was won by the Belfast Giants, claiming their third Elite League championship. The regular season began on 7 September 2013, and ended on 22 March 2014.

== Teams ==
Team	Arena(s)
Belfast Giants	Odyssey Arena
Braehead Clan	Braehead Arena
Cardiff Devils	Cardiff Arena
Coventry Blaze	SkyDome Arena
Dundee Stars	Dundee Ice Arena
Edinburgh Capitals	Murrayfield Ice Rink
Hull Stingrays	Hull Arena
Fife Flyers	Fife Ice Arena
Nottingham Panthers	National Ice Centre
Sheffield Steelers	Motorpoint Arena/IceSheffield

== Elite League Table ==
	Club	GP	W	L	OTL	SOL	Goals	Pts
1.	Belfast Giants	52	43	6	1	2	21:127	89
2.	Sheffield Steelers	52	31	17	1	3	172:141	66
3.	Dundee Stars	52	28	20	1	3	152:148	60
4.	Nottingham Panthers	52	25	20	4	3	188:169	57
5.	Braehead Clan	52	24	20	5	3	180:171	56
6.	Coventry Blaze	52	24	22	4	2	168:167	54
7.	Fife Flyers	52	24	23	3	2	172:188	53
8.	Hull Stingrays	52	24	24	1	3	168:186	52
9.	Cardiff Devils	52	24	24	2	2	162:182	52
10.	Edinburgh Capitals	52	13	36	0	3	134:227	29

GP=Games Played W=Win, L=Lose, OTL=Over Time Loses, SOL=Shoot Out Loses, Pts=Points,

== Conference Tables ==
=== Gardiner Conference ===
	Club	GP	W	L	OTL/SOL	Goals	Pts
1.	Dundee Stars	32	21	9	2	103:88	44
2.	Hull Stingrays	32	17	12	3	114:108	37
3.	Fife Flyers	32	18	14	0	116:111	36
4.	Braehead Clan	32	15	12	5	114:100	35
5.	Edinburgh Capitals	32	9	20	3	85:125	21

=== Erhardt Conference ===
	Club	GP	W	L	OTL/SOL	Goals	Pts
1.	Belfast Giants	32	26	4	2	128:79	54
2.	Sheffield Steelers	32	17	12	3	101:96	37
3.	Nottingham Panthers	32	12	15	5	99:102	29
4.	Coventry Blaze	32	13	17	2	93:115	28
5.	Cardiff Devils	32	12	18	2	91:120	26

== Elite League Playoffs ==
=== Quarterfinals ===
Team 1	Agg.	Team 2	1st leg	2nd leg
Belfast Giants	7:3	Hull Stingrays	4:1	3:2
Sheffield Steelers	9:3	Coventry Blaze	3:2	6:1
Dundee Stars	4:8	Fife Flyers	3:4	1:4
Nottingham Panthers	1:9	Braehead Clan	0:4	1:5

=== Semifinals ===
Home team		Away team	Score
Belfast Giants	–	Fife Flyers	1:0 (0:0, 0:0, 1:0)
Sheffield Steelers	–	Braehead Clan	3:2 (2:1, 0:1, 1:0)

=== 3rd place game ===
Home team		Away team	Score
Braehead Clan	–	Fife Flyers	7:6 OT (0:2, 3:2, 3:2, 1:0)

=== Final ===
Home team		Away team	Score
Belfast Giants	–	Sheffield Steelers	2:3 OT (0:0, 2:2, 0:0, 0:1)

== Challenge Cup ==
- NOTE: Some Cup games double up as League games due to scheduling constraints.

Top 4 in each group qualify for Quarter-Finals

(Q) denotes teams who qualified from the quarter-finals into the semi-finals.

=== Group A ===
Position	Team	GP	W	L	T	GF	GA	Pts
1	Belfast Giants (Q)	12	9	1	1	51	28	19
2	Dundee Stars	10	5	5	0	26	28	10
3	Fife Flyers	10	4	5	1	26	31	9
4	Braehead Clan	10	4	6	0	33	32	8
5	Edinburgh Capitals	8	1	6	1	10	34	3

=== Group B ===
Position	Team	GP	W	L	T	GF	GA	Pts
1	Nottingham Panthers (Q)	14	12	2	0	72	40	24
2	Cardiff Devils (Q)	12	7	4	0	44	41	14
3	Sheffield Steelers (Q)	12	7	5	0	41	41	14
4	Hull Stingrays	8	1	6	1	28	40	3
5	Coventry Blaze	8	1	6	1	20	36	3

=== Challenge Cup Knockout Stages ===
- The Knockout Stages were two-legged affairs, home and away. Aggregate figures shown in bold.

Semifinals
1	Belfast Giants	7	3	10
4	Cardiff Devils	1	3	4
3	Nottingham Panthers	5	6	11
2	Sheffield Steelers	3	4	7

Finals
Nottingham Panthers	3	4	7
Belfast Giants	5	1	6
