= 2015–16 EIHL season =

- League: Elite Ice Hockey League
- Sport: Ice hockey
- Duration: September – March
- Average attendance: 2,771

Regular season
- League: Sheffield Steelers
- Season MVP: Joey Martin (Cardiff Devils)
- Top scorer: Joey Martin (Cardiff Devils)

Challenge Cup
- Champions: Nottingham Panthers

Conference
- Erhardt champions: Cardiff Devils
- Erhardt runners-up: Sheffield Steelers
- Gardiner champions: Braehead Clan
- Gardiner runners-up: Fife Flyers

Playoffs
- Champions: Nottingham Panthers
- Runners-up: Coventry Blaze

EIHL seasons
- 2014–15 2016–17

The 2015–16 Elite Ice Hockey League season was the 13th season of the Elite Ice Hockey League. The regular season began in September 2015 and ended in March 2016.

On 30 April 2014, the Elite League had announced changes to the import rules which would apply to the 2015-16 season: the number of non British-trained players would rise from 12 to 13, while the number of work-permit players would remain at 11.

== Teams ==
The ten teams were split into two conferences. Teams played the sides in their conferences four times, home and away (32 games), and played the sides in the other conferences twice, home and away (20 games).

The season was marked by the disappearance of the Hull Stingrays, who were replaced by the Manchester Phoenix, the first top-level team to play in the city since Manchester Storm folded in 2002-03.

Conference champions Sheffield Steelers and Braehead Clan took first and third spot in the league, but, in a repeat of the previous season, neither side could continue their success in the playoffs, which was won by Nottingham Panthers, who beat Coventry Blaze 2-0 in the final.

The Challenge Cup was also won by the Panthers who beat the Cardiff Devils in a 1-0 overtime win.

Erhardt Conference

TEAM	CITY/TOWN	ARENA	CAPACITY
Belfast Giants	Belfast	SSE Arena Belfast	7,200
Cardiff Devils	(Wales) Cardiff	Cardiff Arena	2,500
Coventry Blaze	(England) Coventry	SkyDome Arena	3,000
Nottingham Panthers	(England) Nottingham	National Ice Centre	7,500
Sheffield Steelers	(England) Sheffield	Motorpoint Arena	8,500

Gardiner Conference

TEAM	CITY/TOWN	ARENA	CAPACITY
Braehead Clan	(Scotland) Glasgow	Braehead Arena	4,000
Dundee Stars	(Scotland) Dundee	Dundee Ice Arena	2,400
Edinburgh Capitals	(Scotland) Edinburgh	Murrayfield Ice Rink	3,700
Fife Flyers	(Scotland) Kirkcaldy	Fife Ice Arena	3,525
Manchester Storm	(England) Altrincham	Altrincham Ice Dome	2,000

== Standings ==
=== Overall ===
Pos	Team	Pld	W	OTW	OTL	L	GF	GA	GD	Pts	Qualification
1	Sheffield Steelers (Q)	52	27	7	4	14	190	161	+29	72	Regular season champions Qualification to playoffs
2	Cardiff Devils (Q)	52	27	6	4	15	179	139	+40	70	Qualification to playoffs
3	Braehead Clan (Q)	52	28	2	7	15	185	145	+40	67	Qualification to playoffs
4	Belfast Giants (Q)	52	24	7	4	17	184	148	+36	66	Qualification to playoffs
5	Nottingham Panthers (Q)	52	24	6	2	20	185	152	+33	62	Qualification to playoffs
6	Fife Flyers (Q)	52	21	5	3	23	171	164	+7	55	Qualification to playoffs
7	Dundee Stars (Q)	52	19	3	11	19	200	196	+4	55	Qualification to playoffs
8	Coventry Blaze (Q)	52	18	6	3	25	160	177	−17	51	Qualification to playoffs
9	Manchester Storm	52	19	1	4	28	189	227	−38	44	
10	Edinburgh Capitals	52	6	4	5	37	153	287	−134	25	

Source: EIHL
Rules for classification: 1) Points; 2) Games won in regulation time; 3) Number of games won; 4) Head-to-head results, ranked by criteria 1 to 3; 5) Fewest regulation losses; 6) Away game results, ranked by criteria 1 to 3; 7) Goals scored; 8) Drawing of lots.

=== Erhardt Conference ===
Only intra-conference games counted towards the Erhardt Conference standings. Each team played the other four teams in the Conference eight times, for a total of 32 matches.

Pos	Team	Pld	W	OTW	OTL	L	GF	GA	GD	Pts	Qualification
1	Cardiff Devils	32	17	3	2	10	111	88	+23	42	Conference champions
2	Sheffield Steelers	32	16	2	2	12	99	102	−3	38	
3	Belfast Giants	32	12	3	4	13	99	99	0	34	
4	Nottingham Panthers	32	13	1	2	16	102	102	0	30	
5	Coventry Blaze	32	10	3	2	17	88	108	−20	28	

Source: EIHL
Rules for classification: 1) Points; 2) Games won in regulation time; 3) Number of games won; 4) Head-to-head results, ranked by criteria 1 to 3; 5) Fewest regulation losses; 6) Away game results, ranked by criteria 1 to 3; 7) Goals scored; 8) Drawing of lots.

=== Gardiner Conference ===
Only intra-conference games counted towards the Gardiner Conference standings. Each team played the other four teams in the Conference eight times, for a total of 32 matches.

Pos	Team	Pld	W	OTW	OTL	L	GF	GA	GD	Pts	Qualification
1	Braehead Clan	32	20	1	1	10	125	86	+39	43	Conference champions
2	Fife Flyers	32	16	5	1	10	124	97	+27	43	
3	Dundee Stars	32	16	2	3	11	142	106	+36	39	
4	Manchester Storm	32	15	1	2	14	140	140	0	34	
5	Edinburgh Capitals	32	3	1	3	25	89	191	−102	11	

Source: EIHL
Rules for classification: 1) Points; 2) Games won in regulation time; 3) Number of games won; 4) Head-to-head results, ranked by criteria 1 to 3; 5) Fewest regulation losses; 6) Away game results, ranked by criteria 1 to 3; 7) Goals scored; 8) Drawing of lots.

== League Officials ==
Position	Name
Chairman	Tony Smith
Media Representative	Chris Ellis
Head of Discipline	Moray Hansen
Head Referee	Mick Hicks
