= 2011–12 EIHL season =

- League: Elite Ice Hockey League
- Sport: Ice hockey
- Duration: September – March

Regular season
- Champions: Belfast Giants

Playoffs
- Champions: Nottingham Panthers

Challenge Cup
- Champions: Nottingham Panthers

EIHL seasons
- ← 2010–11 2012–13 →

The 2011–12 Elite Ice Hockey League season featured 10 teams. It started on 3 September 2011 and finished on 8 April 2012. The Fife Flyers replaced the Newcastle Vipers.

== Teams ==
Team name	Arena	General manager	Joined	Head coach	Captain	Alternate captain	Alternate captain
Belfast Giants	Odyssey Arena	Todd Kelman	2003	Doug Christianson	Jeremy Rebek	Nick Kuiper	Adam Keefe
Braehead Clan	Braehead Arena	Kirsty Longmuir	2010	Drew Bannister	Jordan Krestanovitch	Tim Wedderburn	
Cardiff Devils	Cardiff Arena	Simon Hodgkinson	2003	Gerad Adams	Stuart MacRae	Kenton Smith	Phil Hill
Coventry Blaze	SkyDome Arena	Sally Mahers	2003	Paul Thompson	Jonathan Weaver	Dustin Wood	Bryan Jurynec
Dundee Stars	Dundee Ice Arena	Charlie Ward	2010	Brent Hughes	A.J. MacLean	John Dolan	
Edinburgh Capitals	Murrayfield Ice Rink	Matthew Tailford	2005	Richard Hartmann	Jan Safar	Daniel McIntyre	Bari McKenzie
Fife Flyers	Fife Ice Arena	Tom Muir	2011	Todd Dutiaume	Dan Ceman	Kyle Horne	Andy Samuel
Hull Stingrays	Hull Arena	Dianne Cowley	2006	Sylvain Cloutier	Kurtis Dulle	Jason Silverthorn	Dmitry Rodin
Nottingham Panthers	National Ice Centre	Gary Moran	2003	Corey Neilson	Danny Meyers	David Clarke	David Alexandre Beaurgard
Sheffield Steelers	Sheffield Arena	Andy Turner	2003	Ryan Finnerty	Jonathan Phillips	Rod Sarich	Jeff Legue

== Elite League Table ==
Regular season standings	GP	W	L	OTW	OTL	Pts
Belfast Giants	54	46	5	1	2	95
Sheffield Steelers	54	41	11	1	1	84
Nottingham Panthers	54	38	12	2	2	80
Cardiff Devils	54	32	12	4	6	74
Coventry Blaze	54	32	20	1	1	66
Braehead Clan	54	31	19	2	2	66
Hull Stingrays	54	16	34	2	2	36
Dundee Stars	54	13	35	3	3	32
Edinburgh Capitals	54	13	37	1	3	30
Fife Flyers	54	8	40	1	3	22

GP=Games Played W=Win, L=Lose, OTW=Over Time Wins, OTL=Over Time Loses, Pts=Points,

== Elite League play-offs ==
After the two legged quarter finals the end of season playoffs were held at the National Ice Centre in Nottingham during the weekend of 7 and 8 April 2012. Regular season league winners Belfast Giants lost in the semi-finals to Cardiff Devils. The title was won by the Nottingham Panthers after defeating Cardiff Devils 2–0, the second successive time that Nottingham had beaten Cardiff in the final.

Quarter-finals
1	Belfast Giants	14 (5,9)
8	Dundee Stars	0 (0,0)
4	Cardiff Devils	7 (3,4)
5	Coventry Blaze	4 (3,1)
3	Nottingham Panthers	5 (5,0)
6	Braehead Clan	4 (1,3)
2	Sheffield Steelers	4 (2,2)
7	Hull Stingrays	7 (5,2)

Semi-finals
Belfast Giants	3
Cardiff Devils	4 (after OT)
Nottingham Panthers	10
Hull Stingrays	3

Final
Cardiff Devils	0
Nottingham Panthers	2

== Challenge Cup ==
- NOTE: Some Cup games double up as League games due to scheduling constraints.

Top 2 in each group qualify for Semi-finals

(Q) means teams has qualified for Semi-finals

=== Group A ===
Position	Team	GP	W	L	T	GF	GA	Pts
1	Belfast Giants (Q)	8	6	1	1	46	13	13
2	Braehead Clan (Q)	8	5	2	1	38	22	11
3	Dundee Stars	8	3	2	3	22	24	9
4	Fife Flyers	8	2	6	0	21	47	4
5	Edinburgh Capitals	8	1	6	1	22	42	3

=== Group B ===
Position	Team	GP	W	L	T	GF	GA	Pts
1	Nottingham Panthers (Q)	8	6	1	1	38	17	13
2	Cardiff Devils (Q)	8	4	2	2	24	20	10
3	Sheffield Steelers	8	4	2	2	21	20	10
4	Coventry Blaze	8	1	4	3	16	32	5
5	Hull Stingrays	8	0	6	2	15	26	2

=== Knockout stages ===
- The Knockout Stages will be played over 2-Legs, Home and Away. (Aggregate Scores shown, First and Second Leg scores in brackets)

Semi-finals
1	Braehead Clan	3 (3,0)
4	Nottingham Panthers	5 (2,3)
3	Cardiff Devils	5 (2,3)
2	Belfast Giants	6 (1,5)

Final
Nottingham Panthers	10 (5,5)
Belfast Giants	4 (1,3)
