= 2010–11 EIHL season =

- League: Elite Ice Hockey League
- Sport: Ice hockey
- Duration: September – March

Regular season
- Champions: Sheffield Steelers

Playoffs
- Champions: Nottingham Panthers

Challenge Cup
- Champions: Nottingham Panthers

EIHL seasons
- 2009–10 2011–12

The 2010–11 Elite Ice Hockey League season started on 25 August 2010, with the annual Charity Shield match between Coventry Blaze and Belfast Giants. The game took place at 7.30 pm on 25 August 2010. The match ended in 4–2 victory for the Giants.

The League proper started on 4 September,. Two new teams joined for the 2010–11 season- the Braehead Clan and the Dundee Stars.

Sky Sports broadcast one live game every Friday, and also showed the Belfast Giants v Nottingham Panthers opening night game live followed by a live game once every month.

The EIHL appointed an official mascot called Rory, who wears a light blue hockey jersey and the number 00.

== Teams ==
Team	Arena(s)
Belfast Giants	Odyssey Arena
Braehead Clan	Braehead Arena
Cardiff Devils	Cardiff Arena
Coventry Blaze	SkyDome Arena
Dundee Stars	Dundee Ice Arena
Edinburgh Capitals	Murrayfield Ice Rink
Hull Stingrays	Hull Arena
Newcastle Vipers	Whitley Bay Ice Rink
Nottingham Panthers	National Ice Centre
Sheffield Steelers	Motorpoint Arena/IceSheffield

== Elite League Table ==
Regular season standings	GP	W	L	OTL	SL	Pts
Sheffield Steelers	54	43	10	0	1	87
Cardiff Devils	54	42	9	2	1	87
Belfast Giants	54	41	9	2	2	86
Nottingham Panthers	54	33	15	1	5	72
Braehead Clan	54	28	23	0	3	59
Coventry Blaze	54	23	27	2	2	50
Hull Stingrays	54	23	28	3	0	49
Dundee Stars	54	19	32	0	3	41
Newcastle Vipers	54	12	40	0	2	26
Edinburgh Capitals	54	6	45	1	2	15

GP=Games Played W=Win, L=Lose, OTL=Over Time Loses, SL=Shoot Out Loses, Pts=Points

== Elite League playoffs ==
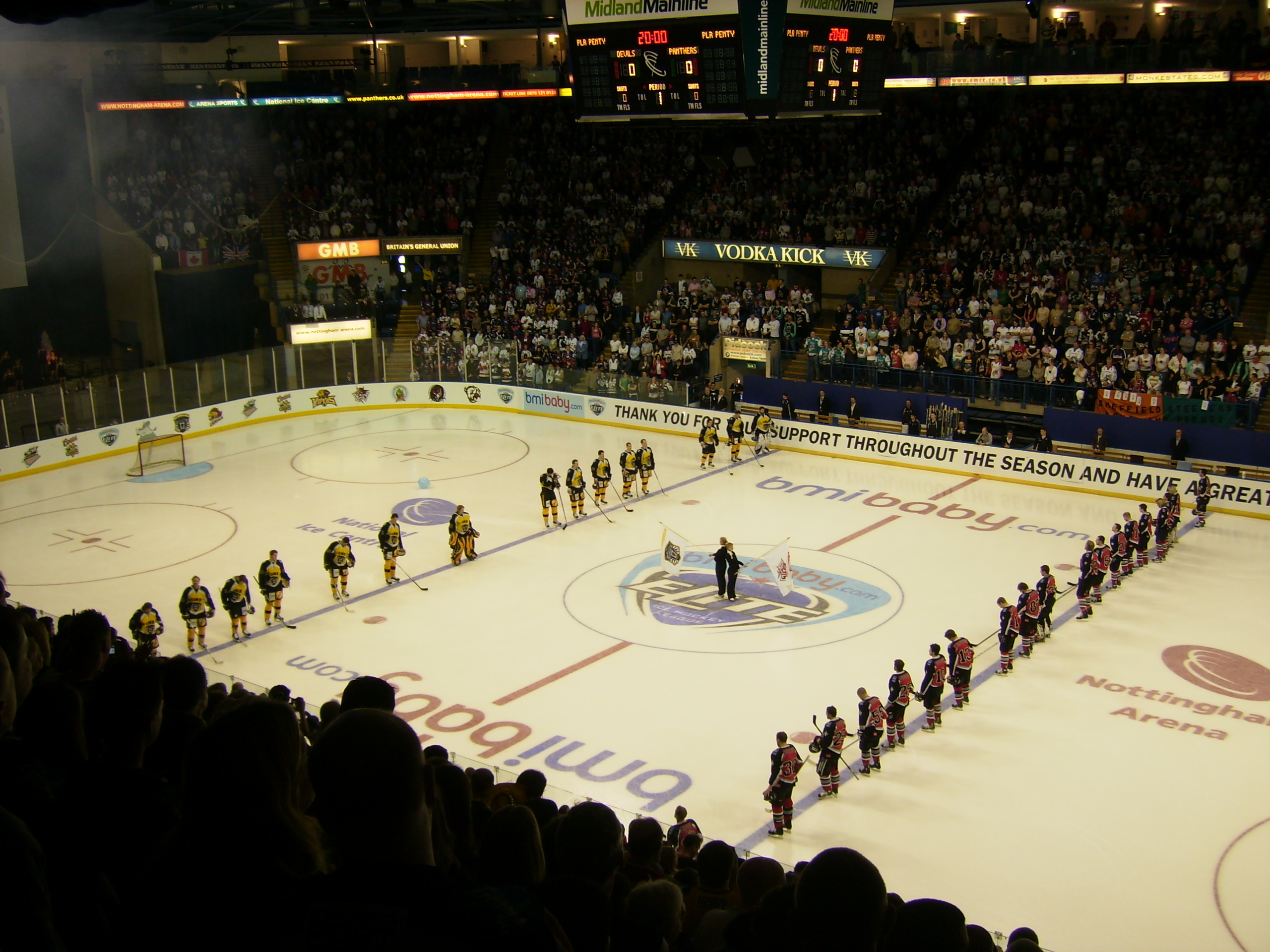
Nottingham Panthers vs Cardiff Devils at the play-off final

The end of season playoffs were held at the National Ice Centre in Nottingham during the weekend of 2 and 3 April 2011.

The weekend began with the biggest rivalry in the game, with the Sheffield Steelers playing the Nottingham Panthers. Sheffield took an early 2-goal advantage, but Panthers fought back, and went on to steal the game 4–3 in overtime, Robert Lachowicz scoring the winning goal. The second semi-final between Cardiff Devils and Belfast Giants saw Cardiff win by 4 goals to 1, seen by many as an upset, as Belfast were fancied to take the crown.

The title was won by the Nottingham Panthers after defeating Cardiff Devils 5–4 in a closely fought final, where again Nottingham came from two goals down.

Quarter-finals
1	Sheffield Steelers	8 (6,2)
8	Dundee Stars	5 (1,4)
4	Nottingham Panthers	8 (5,3)
5	Braehead Clan	4 (4,0)
3	Belfast Giants	4 (2,2)
6	Coventry Blaze	3 (2,1) (after SO)
2	Cardiff Devils	8 (2,6)
7	Hull Stingrays	4 (1,3)

Semi-finals
Sheffield Steelers	3
Nottingham Panthers	4 (after OT)
Cardiff Devils	4
Belfast Giants	1

Final
Nottingham Panthers	5
Cardiff Devils	4

== Challenge Cup ==
- NOTE: Some Cup games double up as League games due to scheduling constraints.

Top 2 in each group qualify for Semi-finals

(Q) means teams has qualified for Semi-finals

=== Group A ===
Position	Team	GP	W	L	T	GF	GA	GD	Pts
1	Belfast Giants (Q)	8	5	1	2	31	20	+11	12
2	Newcastle Vipers (Q)	8	4	2	2	32	29	+3	10
3	Braehead Clan	8	4	3	1	31	24	+7	9
4	Edinburgh Capitals	8	3	4	1	24	27	−3	7
5	Dundee Stars	8	0	6	2	18	36	−18	2

=== Group B ===
Position	Team	GP	W	L	T	GF	GA	GD	Pts
1	Nottingham Panthers (Q)	8	3	1	4	23	15	+8	10
2	Cardiff Devils (Q)	8	3	1	4	33	31	+2	10
3	Sheffield Steelers	8	4	3	1	32	29	+3	9
4	Coventry Blaze	8	3	4	1	22	23	−1	7
5	Hull Stingrays	8	1	5	2	19	31	−12	4

=== Challenge Cup Knockout Stages ===
- The Knockout Stages will be played over 2-Legs, Home and Away. (Aggregate Scores shown, First and Second Leg scores in brackets)

Semi-finals
Belfast Giants	5 (4, 1)
Cardiff Devils	2 (0, 2)
Nottingham Panthers	18 (3, 15)
Newcastle Vipers	4 (4, 0)

Final
Belfast Giants	3 (1,2)
Nottingham Panthers	4 (3,1 )

== Aladdin 20–20 Cup ==
The success of the Aladdin 20–20 Cup during the previous season led the EIHL to schedule a second such contest. The second 20–20 Cup took place in Nottingham on Saturday, 12 March 2011 and included four teams: the Nottingham Panthers, Sheffield Steelers, Coventry Blaze and Braehead Clan.

The Braehead Clan captured their first EIHL trophy, defeating the host Nottingham Panthers by a score of 3–0. Braehead goaltender J.F. Parras kept a clean sheet in the final and Adam Walker, Ryan Campbell and captain Brendan Cook all scored.

== Boston Bruins Select Game ==
On Saturday, 2 October, the Belfast Giants select side, made of Elite League Players played a Boston Bruins select side at the Odyssey Arena in Belfast. Boston won the match 5–1.

	1st period	2nd Period	3rd Period	Final score
Boston Bruins	0	3	2	5
Belfast Giants	0	1	0	1

=== Period 1 ===
No scoring

=== Period 2 ===
Goals

Boston Bruins	Belfast Giants
Tyler Seguin (16:30)	Jade Galbraith (15:40)
Zdeno Chara (18:20)	
Dennis Seidenberg (19:02)	

Penalties

=== Period 3 ===
Goals

Boston Bruins	Belfast Giants
Milan Lucic (9:56)	
Tyler Seguin (16:32)	

Penalties
