= Planet Ice Altrincham =

Ice arena in Manchester, England

- The Storm Shelter
- Interactive map of Planet Ice Altrincham
- Location: Oakfield Road; Altrincham, Greater Manchester; WA14 1BA; England
- Coordinates: 53.3868°N 2.3458°W
- Operator: Planet Ice
- Capacity: 2,440 (2,140 seated)
- Type: Ice Rink Sports Venue

Construction
- Opened: 2007

Tenants
- Manchester Phoenix (2007–2015); Manchester Storm (2015-2026); Altrincham Aces; Manchester Storm Academy; Manchester Metros

Website
- Silver Blades official website

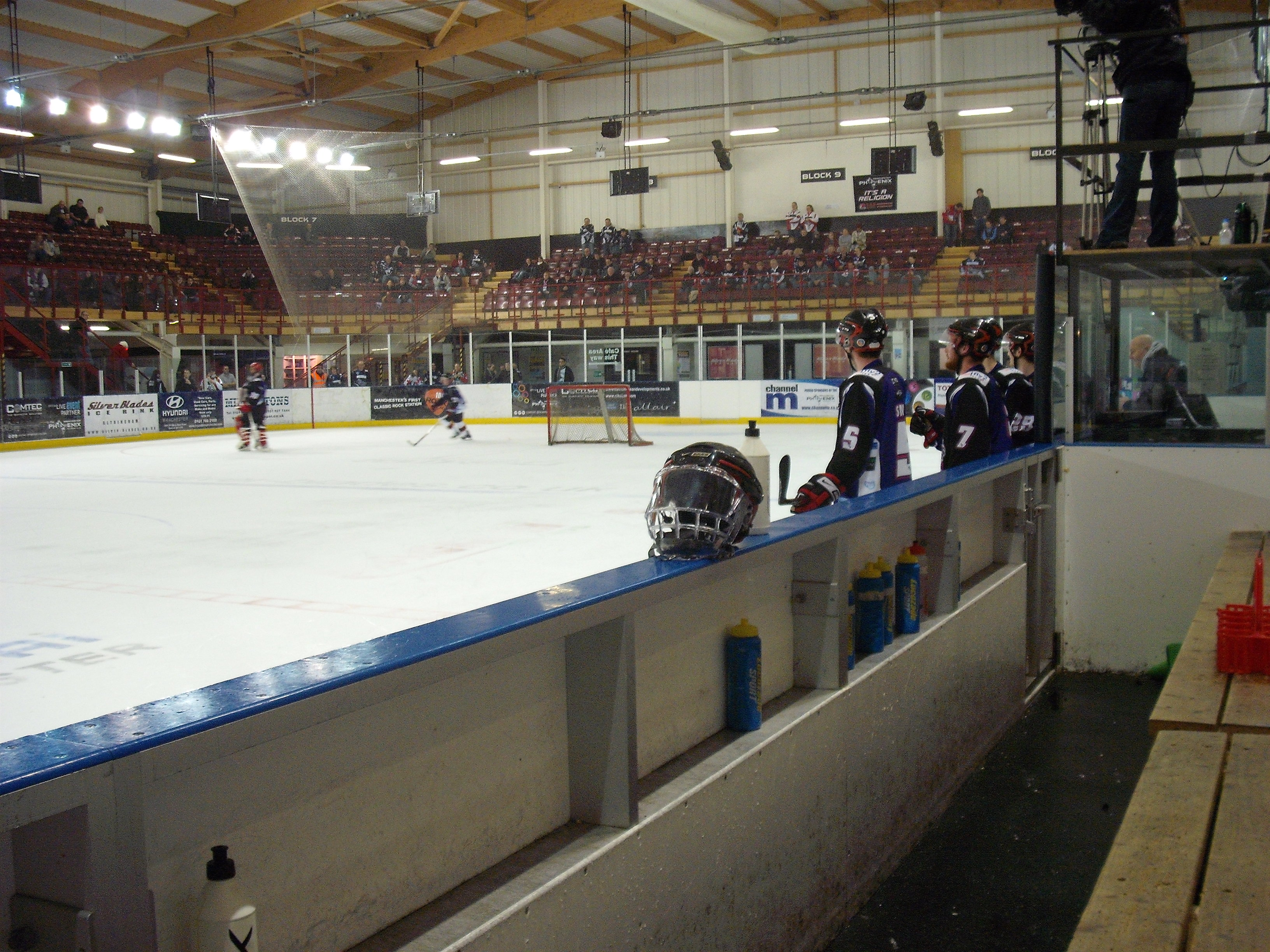
The interior of Planet Ice Altrincham, towards the closed end of the horseshoe, taken from the home team bench.

Planet Ice Altrincham (formerly known as the Altrincham Ice Dome) is an ice rink operated by Planet Ice in Altrincham, Greater Manchester. It has 2,140 seats and up to 300 standing places.

Planet Ice Altrincham hosts the home matches of the Altrincham Aces ice hockey clubs, the university ice hockey team Manchester Metros, as well as junior ice hockey (Manchester Storm Junior Academy), public skating sessions, birthday parties, private events, and skating lessons. It was previously the home of the Manchester Phoenix until a legal dispute arose in 2014-2015 between the management of the ice rink and the Phoenix team over alleged financial impropriety regarding junior teams at the venue.

In 2026, following rumours the Manchester Storm would be moving to the AO Arena, Planet Ice chose not to renew the licence for Manchester Storm for the 2026/27 season, leaving them without a home rink.

The rink replaced the original Altrincham Ice Rink, which had closed in 2003. The Dome itself was originally meant to be replaced by a more permanent 3,000 seat facility as part of the Altair development, but changes to the plans have seen the current rink retained, with alterations to be made, including the addition of a 10 pin bowling facility

== Construction ==
Planet Ice Altrincham is a prefabricated structure constructed in Finland. The building uses a wood and steel frame, with the lower half of the walls being made of brickwork, whilst the upper half and roof are clad in aluminum sheeting. The base of the ice pad is compacted sand which contains the pipework for the ice plant.

Assembly began in August 2006, and cost around £2.5m. The rink was due to open on 24 September 2006, when Manchester Phoenix were scheduled to host the Sheffield Steelers in their opening home game. But due to several delays,, the opening was put back to 17 February 2007 match against the Edinburgh Capitals, with a reduced capacity of 1,200. However, due to the ice surface not being ready in time, the first game actually took place on 25 February 2007, against Basingstoke Bison. The number of people allowed into the building was just 1,000. The seating was finally finished in October 2007.

A series of plasma screen monitors were installed during the first half of the 2007–2008 season, to help the Phoenix improve the experience of the game night as well as countering the limited sightlines. Parts of the ice surface were obscured by walkways and access steps. The introduction of the screens has helped alleviate this as a live feed from the in house cameras is shown. The club also uses these screens during the pre-match build up and during breaks in play to improve the match night presentation. The rinks lighting system appeared to have been upgraded during the 2009–10 season, and an LED screen was fitted above the scoreboard. This screen currently advertise in-rink events.

Since opening, the building has been subject to a number of alterations. The first major alteration was the addition of a stage area situated in 'Block 2'. This is currently being used by the cheerleaders and team mascot of the Manchester Phoenix ice hockey team during breaks in play. The building also features a licensed bar, which is currently only open on match nights. The bar was renovated during the 2009–10 season, with a suspended ceiling being fitted (previously the bars 'ceiling' was the underside of the seating terrace above it). A dehumidification system was installed during the 2008–09 season to help maintain the quality of the ice, which had been a cause of concern for some visiting clubs and match officials. Evidence of this came from some lengthy pre match inspections and discussions occurring on-ice (eye-witness account). The most recent alteration has been the construction of a hospitality area at the back of 'Block 7', for the entertaining of sponsors. This was constructed during the 2009–10 season. As of the start of the 2010–11 season, this block will be the official 'VIP/Sponsors' block. During the summer of 2010, the rink and ice hockey club are making a further alteration with the installation of luxury seating, handrails, and a bar to 'Block 15'. This block of seating will be known as the 'Gold Seating' block.

The rink had a life expectancy of 15 years, and was expected to be replaced approximately 5 years after opening by a larger permanent facility on land adjacent to the current build. This is no longer the case, and the rink is to be substantially refurbished as part of the updated Altair development scheme.

The rink opened its doors to the public for ice skating sessions on 16 March 2007.

The first sold out event at the rink was on New Year's Day 2019 when Manchester Storm hosted the Sheffield Steelers in front of a capacity crowd of 2,351.

== Building description ==
The building contains an ice pad measuring 57m by 26m, constructed on a sand base with an ice thickness of 1.5 inches which is fully enclosed by plexiglass and wood barriers (also known as 'dasher boards'). Contained within this surround are 2 team benches, 2 penalty boxes, and a timekeepers booth. There are a number of "gates" contained within the boards to allow access onto the ice by users and for ice maintenance.

The building uses a horseshoe arrangement for the seating areas contained within. This seating is raised up above the ice level, creating an ice level concourse. Disabled seating is provided on a raised platform at ice level, in the open end of the horseshoe. At both ends of the ice pad, netting is hung from the ceiling to the plexiglass, as per IIHF safety regulations to prevent injury to crowd members from stray pucks hit out of the ice. At the top of Block 7 is a partially enclosed hospitality area built for use by the sponsors of the resident ice hockey team. A bar area has also been added to the rear of Block 15. A media booth is situated at the rear of Block 11, which hosts the match night media crew who are responsible for all audio/visual work before and during ice hockey matches. A separate DJ booth is located at ice level between the team benches for use during public skating sessions. A scoreboard and game clock is mounted on the rink wall above the disabled seating area.

All of the buildings other facilities (toilets, concession stands, skate hire, storage lockers, public bar, changing rooms, etc.) are arranged around the concourse at ice level, on the outer wall of the building. The rink shop is located at the front of the building, adjacent to the box office.

== Future plans ==
The current rink is a semi-permanent structure, and was set to be replaced as part of the £100m 'Altair' re-development, which was due to be completed in 2016. The building is now to be made permanent, and subjected to significant alterations.

On 27th April 2026 Manchester Storm announced they were leaving Altrincham and returning to the AO Arena.
