= 2014–15 EIHL season =

- League: Elite Ice Hockey League
- Sport: Ice hockey
- Duration: September – March

Regular season
- League: Sheffield Steelers
- Top scorer: Mathieu Roy, Sheffield Steelers

Challenge Cup
- Champions: Cardiff Devils

Conference
- Erhardt champions: Nottingham Panthers
- Erhardt runners-up: Sheffield Steelers
- Gardiner champions: Braehead Clan
- Gardiner runners-up: Fife Flyers

Playoffs
- Champions: Coventry Blaze
- Runners-up: Sheffield Steelers

EIHL seasons
- 2013–14 2015–16

The 2014–15 Elite Ice Hockey League season was the 12th season of the Elite Ice Hockey League. The regular season began in early September and ended in March.

On 30 April 2014, the Elite League announced changes to the import rules, as from the 2014–15 season, the number of non British-trained players would rise from 11 to 12, while the number of work-permit players would remain at 11. The number of non British-trained players would then rise to 13 in season 2015-16 and 14 in season 2016–17, with the number of work-permit players again remaining at 11.

The EIHL lost some top British players such as Jonathan Weaver and Danny Meyers along with Matt Towe and Sam Zajac to the EPIHL, the first team to take advantage of the rule changes was the Steelers with them announcing the signing of British/Canadian Rod Sarich.

== Teams ==
The ten teams were split into two conferences. Teams played the sides in their conferences four times, home and away (32 games), and played the sides in the other conferences twice, home and away (20 games).

Conference champions Braehead Clan and Sheffield Steelers took the top two spots in the league, but neither side could continue their success in the playoffs, which was won by Coventry Blaze, who beat the Steelers 4–2 in the final.

The Challenge Cup went to the Cardiff Devils, with the Steelers again finishing runners-up, losing 2–1.

Erhardt Conference

TEAM	CITY/TOWN	ARENA	CAPACITY
Belfast Giants	Belfast	Odyssey Arena	8,700
Cardiff Devils	(Wales) Cardiff	Cardiff Arena	2,500
Coventry Blaze	(England) Coventry	SkyDome Arena	3,000
Nottingham Panthers	(England) Nottingham	National Ice Centre	7,500
Sheffield Steelers	(England) Sheffield	Motorpoint Arena	8,500

Gardiner Conference

TEAM	CITY/TOWN	ARENA	CAPACITY
Braehead Clan	(Scotland) Glasgow	Braehead Arena	4,000
Dundee Stars	(Scotland) Dundee	Dundee Ice Arena	2,400
Edinburgh Capitals	(Scotland) Edinburgh	Murrayfield Ice Rink	3,700
Fife Flyers	(Scotland) Kirkcaldy	Fife Ice Arena	3,525
Hull Stingrays	(England) Hull	Hull Arena	3,150

== Standings ==
=== Overall ===
Pos	Team	Pld	W	OTW	OTL	L	GF	GA	GD	Pts	Qualification
1	Sheffield Steelers (Q)	52	30	5	4	13	193	134	+59	74	Regular season champions Qualification to playoffs
2	Braehead Clan (Q)	52	33	2	3	14	190	136	+54	73	Qualification to playoffs
3	Cardiff Devils (Q)	52	29	5	4	14	210	151	+59	72	Qualification to playoffs
4	Nottingham Panthers (Q)	52	23	6	7	16	166	141	+25	65	Qualification to playoffs
5	Belfast Giants (Q)	52	25	2	6	19	177	148	+29	60	Qualification to playoffs
6	Coventry Blaze (Q)	52	17	7	3	25	127	145	−18	51	Qualification to playoffs
7	Hull Stingrays (Q)	52	16	4	9	23	154	192	−38	49	Qualification to playoffs
8	Fife Flyers (Q)	52	18	4	3	27	170	180	−10	47	Qualification to playoffs
9	Edinburgh Capitals	52	13	7	6	26	135	215	−80	46	
10	Dundee Stars	52	6	8	5	33	123	203	−80	33	

Source: EIHL
Rules for classification: 1) Points; 2) Games won in regulation time; 3) Number of games won; 4) Head-to-head results, ranked by criteria 1 to 3; 5) Fewest regulation losses; 6) Away game results, ranked by criteria 1 to 3; 7) Goals scored; 8) Drawing of lots.

=== Erhardt Conference ===
Only intra-conference games counted towards the Erhardt Conference standings. Each team played the other four teams in the Conference eight times, for a total of 32 matches.

Pos	Team	Pld	W	OTW	OTL	L	GF	GA	GD	Pts	Qualification
1	Nottingham Panthers	32	13	5	4	10	94	81	+13	40	Conference champions
2	Sheffield Steelers	32	15	3	3	11	97	94	+3	39	
3	Cardiff Devils	32	17	1	2	12	114	103	+11	38	
4	Belfast Giants	32	13	2	4	13	97	94	+3	34	
5	Coventry Blaze	32	8	3	1	20	75	105	−30	23	

Source: EIHL
Rules for classification: 1) Points; 2) Games won in regulation time; 3) Number of games won; 4) Head-to-head results, ranked by criteria 1 to 3; 5) Fewest regulation losses; 6) Away game results, ranked by criteria 1 to 3; 7) Goals scored; 8) Drawing of lots.

=== Gardiner Conference ===
Only intra-conference games counted towards the Gardiner Conference standings. Each team played the other four teams in the Conference eight times, for a total of 32 matches.

Pos	Team	Pld	W	OTW	OTL	L	GF	GA	GD	Pts	Qualification
1	Braehead Clan	32	25	1	1	5	135	69	+66	53	Conference champions
2	Fife Flyers	32	15	2	1	14	120	102	+18	35	
3	Hull Stingrays	32	11	3	5	13	104	123	−19	33	
4	Edinburgh Capitals	32	10	4	4	14	87	119	−32	32	
5	Dundee Stars	32	4	5	4	19	84	117	−33	22	

Source: EIHL
Rules for classification: 1) Points; 2) Games won in regulation time; 3) Number of games won; 4) Head-to-head results, ranked by criteria 1 to 3; 5) Fewest regulation losses; 6) Away game results, ranked by criteria 1 to 3; 7) Goals scored; 8) Drawing of lots.

== League Officials ==
Position	Name
Chairman	Tony Smith
Media Representative	Chris Ellis
Head of Discipline	Moray Hansen
Head Referee	Mick Hicks

== Match Officials ==
Referees: Tom Darnell, Michael Hicks, James Ashton, Jonny Liptrott, Dean Smith, Neil Wilson and Stefan Hogarth.

Linesmen: Paul Brooks, Scott Dalgleish, Andrew Dalton, Ally Flockhart, Pavel Halas, James Kavanagh, Sam Motton, Gordon Pirry, Danny Beresford, Matt Rose, Luke Palmer, Paul Brooks, Paul Staniforth and Lee Young.
