= Dundee Ice Arena =

Premier ice rink in Dundee, Scotland

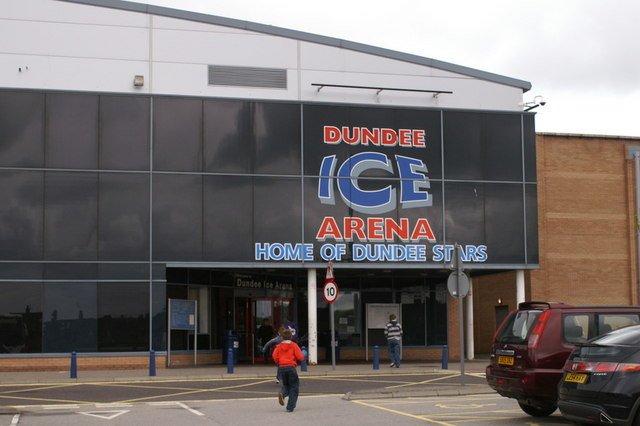
- Interactive map of Dundee Ice Arena
- Address: 7 Dayton Drive
- Location: Dundee, Scotland
- Coordinates: 56.481746°N 3.024628°W
- Owner: Leisure and Culture Dundee
- Operator: Leisure and Culture Dundee
- Capacity: 2,700 (2,396 seated)

Construction
- Groundbreaking: 1998
- Opened: 2000
- Cost: £6.6 million

Tenants
- Dundee Stars; Ice Dundee; Dundee Rockets

Website
- [dundeeicearena.co.uk](http://www.dundeeicearena.co.uk/)

Dundee Ice Arena, a multifaceted ice rink facility, is situated in the Camperdown locality of Dundee, Scotland. Boasting a seating capacity of 2,400, it ranks as the fourth largest ice rink in Scotland, surpassed only by Braehead Arena, Murrayfield Ice Rink, and Fife Ice Arena.

The arena is a hub for various events, prominently hosting Dundee Stars' hockey matches, as well as figure skating contests. It also gained distinction as the inaugural Scottish venue for the 7th WUKF World Karate Championships.

== History ==
Constructed in 2000 with an investment of £6.6 million, Dundee Ice Arena incurs annual operational costs around £400,000. Its opening marked the return of the Dundee Tigers SNL team to their home ground, and they clinched the Scottish National League title in the 2000/01 season before audiences often exceeding 1200.

=== Dundee Stars ===
Established in the 2001/02 season, the Dundee Stars hockey club chose the arena as their home ground. Their journey began in the British National League (2001 - 2005), followed by stints in the SNL and Northern League for five seasons. Subsequently, they ascended to the top-tier Elite Ice Hockey League (EIHL), starting from the 2010/11 season. The Stars, formed in August 2001, celebrated their 20th anniversary in September 2021, attracting over 1500 fans regularly. A noteworthy event was the full house (2400 spectators) match against Fife Flyers on 22/2/20, marking a significant milestone in the EIHL era at Dundee Ice Arena.

=== Ice Dundee ===
Dundee Ice Arena also serves as the base for Ice Dundee, renowned for nurturing some of the UK's finest figure skaters. These athletes frequently represent Great Britain and Ireland in major European and World Championships. The coaching team includes Simon Briggs and Debi Briggs. Key skaters training here are British Ladies Champion Natasha McKay, along with prominent figures such as Karly Robertson and Danielle Harrison.

=== World Karate Championships 2018 ===
In a landmark event for 2018, the arena hosted the 7th WUKF World Karate Championships. This event, the largest of its kind in Dundee, also marked the first time a Scottish city hosted this prestigious tournament. To accommodate the karate events, the ice rink was temporarily transformed into a suitable platform.
