= EIHL All-Star Team =

The All-Star Teams for the British Elite Ice Hockey League are voted for by members of Ice Hockey Journalists UK (formerly known as The British Ice Hockey Writers Association), and coaches and general managers of EIHL teams, to honour the best players at the end of each season.

== 2003–2004 ==
First Team

Position	Player	Nationality	Team
Goaltender	Curtis Cruickshank	(Canada)	Basingstoke Bison
Defence	Dion Darling	(Canada)	Sheffield Steelers
Defence	Kevin Bolibruck	(Canada)	Sheffield Steelers
Forward	Jason Ruff	(Canada)	Belfast Giants
Forward	John Craighead	(Canada)	Nottingham Panthers
Forward	Mark Dutiaume	(Canada)	Sheffield Steelers

Second Team

Position	Player	Nationality	Team
Goaltender	Jayme Platt	(United States)	Manchester Phoenix
Defence	Jeff Burgoyne	(Canada)	Cardiff Devils
Defence	Steve O'Brien	(United States)	Coventry Blaze
Forward	Steve Gallace	(Canada)	Coventry Blaze
Forward	Mark Cadotte	(Canada)	Nottingham Panthers
Forward	Erik Anderson	(United States)	Sheffield Steelers

== 2004–2005 ==
First Team

Position	Player	Nationality	Team
Goaltender	Jody Lehman	(Canada)	Coventry Blaze
Defence	Neal Martin	(Canada)	Coventry Blaze
Defence	Doug Schueller	(United States)	Coventry Blaze
Forward	Tony Hand	(United Kingdom)	Belfast Giants
Forward	Adam Calder	(Canada)	Coventry Blaze
Forward	Vezio Sacratini	(Canada)	Cardiff Devils

Second Team

Position	Player	Nationality	Team
Goaltender	Martin Klempa	(Slovakia)	Belfast Giants
Defence	Wade Belak	(Canada)	Coventry Blaze
Defence	Calle Carlsson	(Sweden)	Nottingham Panthers
Forward	Jon Cullen	(United States)	Cardiff Devils
Forward	George Awada	(United States)	Belfast Giants
Forward	Ashley Tait	(United Kingdom)	Coventry Blaze

== 2005–2006 ==
First Team

Position	Player	Nationality	Team
Goaltender	Trevor Koenig	(Canada)	Newcastle Vipers
Defence	Neal Martin	(Canada)	Coventry Blaze
Defence	Jan Krajíček	(Czech Republic)	Newcastle Vipers
Forward	Theoren Fleury	(Canada)	Belfast Giants
Forward	Ed Courtenay	(Canada)	Belfast Giants
Forward	Evan Cheverie	(Canada)	Coventry Blaze

Second Team

Position	Player	Nationality	Team
Goaltender	Mike Minard	(Canada)	Belfast Giants
Defence	Todd Kelman	(Canada)	Belfast Giants
Defence	Jonathan Weaver	(United Kingdom)	Newcastle Vipers
Forward	Mark Dutiaume	(Canada)	Sheffield Steelers
Forward	Tony Hand	(United Kingdom)	Edinburgh Capitals
Forward	George Awada	(United States)	Belfast Giants

== 2006–2007 ==
First Team

Position	Player	Nationality	Team
Goaltender	Trevor Koenig	(Canada)	Coventry Blaze
Defence	Neal Martin	(Canada)	Coventry Blaze
Defence	Jan Krajicek	(Czech Republic)	Nottingham Panthers
Forward	Mark Smith	(Canada)	Cardiff Devils
Forward	Adam Calder	(Canada)	Coventry Blaze
Forward	Dan Tessier	(Canada)	Sheffield Steelers

Second Team

Position	Player	Nationality	Team
Goaltender	Ratislav Rovnianek	(Slovakia)	Nottingham Panthers
Defence	Tyson Teplitsky	(Canada)	Cardiff Devils
Defence	Jonathan Weaver	(United Kingdom)	Newcastle Vipers
Forward	Dan Carlson	(United States)	Coventry Blaze
Forward	Johan Molin	(Sweden)	Manchester Phoenix
Forward	Sean McAslan	(Canada)	Nottingham Panthers

== 2007–2008 ==
First Team

Position	Player	Nationality	Team
Goaltender	Trevor Koenig	(Canada)	Coventry Blaze
Defence	Jonathan Weaver	(United Kingdom)	Coventry Blaze
Defence	Neal Martin	(Canada)	Coventry Blaze
Forward	Adam Calder	(Canada)	Coventry Blaze
Forward	Joe Tallari	(Canada)	Manchester Phoenix
Forward	Sean McAslan	(Canada)	Nottingham Panthers

Second Team

Position	Player	Nationality	Team
Goaltender	Tom Askey	(United States)	Nottingham Panthers
Defence	Rod Sarich	(Canada)	Sheffield Steelers
Defence	Corey Neilson	(Canada)	Nottingham Panthers
Forward	Peter Campbell	(Canada)	Basingstoke Bison/Belfast Giants
Forward	Dan Carlson	(United States)	Coventry Blaze
Forward	Ed Courtenay	(Canada)	Belfast Giants

== 2008–2009 ==
First Team

Position	Player	Nationality	Team
Goaltender	Jody Lehman	(Canada)	Sheffield Steelers
Defence	Rod Sarich	(Canada)	Sheffield Steelers
Defence	Steve Munn	(Canada)	Sheffield Steelers
Forward	Paul Deniset	(Canada)	Belfast Giants
Forward	David Beauregard	(Canada)	Manchester Phoenix
Forward	Mark Hurtubise	(Canada)	Edinburgh Capitals

Second Team

Position	Player	Nationality	Team
Goaltender	Andrew Verner	(Canada)	Newcastle Vipers
Defence	Jonathan Weaver	(United Kingdom)	Coventry Blaze
Defence	Corey Neilson	(Canada)	Nottingham Panthers
Forward	Greg Chambers	(Canada)	Basingstoke Bison
Forward	Adam Calder	(United States)	Coventry Blaze
Forward	Tony Hand	(United Kingdom)	Manchester Phoenix

== 2009–2010 ==
First Team

Position	Player	Nationality	Team
Goaltender	Stephen Murphy	(United Kingdom)	Belfast Giants
Defence	Wes Jarvis	(Canada)	Cardiff Devils
Defence	Jonathan Weaver	(United Kingdom)	Coventry Blaze
Forward	Colin Shields	(United Kingdom)	Belfast Giants
Forward	Luke Fulghum	(United States)	Coventry Blaze
Forward	Jade Galbraith	(Canada)	Nottingham Panthers

Second Team

Position	Player	Nationality	Team
Goaltender	Peter Hirsch	(Denmark)	Coventry Blaze
Defence	Michael Jacobsen	(Canada)	Belfast Giants
Defence	Corey Neilson	(Canada)	Nottingham Panthers
Forward	Greg Chambers	(Canada) (United Kingdom)	Coventry Blaze
Forward	Owen Fussey	(Canada) (United Kingdom)	Edinburgh Capitals
Forward	Jeffrey Szwez	(Canada) (Germany)	Belfast Giants

== 2010–2011 ==
First Team

Position	Player	Nationality	Team
Goaltender	Ervins Mustukovs	(Latvia)	Sheffield Steelers
Defence	Jon Gleed	(Canada)	Belfast Giants
Forward	Scott Matzka	(United States)	Cardiff Devils
Forward	Jereme Tendler	(Canada)	Hull Stingrays
Forward	Jon Pelle	(United States)	Cardiff Devils
Forward	Craig Weller	(Canada)	Cardiff Devils

Second Team

Position	Player	Nationality	Team
Goaltender	Stephen Murphy	(United Kingdom)	Belfast Giants
Defence	Jon Landry	(Canada)	Braehead Clan
Defence	Corey Neilson	(Canada)	Nottingham Panthers
Forward	Jeff Legue	(Canada) (United Kingdom)	Sheffield Steelers
Forward	Luke Fulghum	(United States)	Coventry Blaze
Forward	Joe Talbot	(Canada)	Sheffield Steelers

== 2011–2012 ==
First Team

Position	Player	Nationality	Team
Goaltender	Stephen Murphy	(United Kingdom)	Belfast Giants
Defence	Jeff Mason	(United States)	Belfast Giants
Defence	Corey Neilson	(Canada)	Nottingham Panthers
Forward	Jade Galbraith	(Canada)	Braehead Clan
Forward	Shea Guthrie	(Canada)	Coventry Blaze
Forward	Robert Dowd	(United Kingdom)	Belfast Giants

Second Team

Position	Player	Nationality	Team
Goaltender	Craig Kowalski	(United States)	Nottingham Panthers
Defence	Jeremy Rebek	(Canada) (Austria)	Belfast Giants
Defence	Dustin Wood	(Canada)	Coventry Blaze
Forward	Jeff Legue	(Canada) (United Kingdom)	Sheffield Steelers
Forward	Jordan Fox	(United States)	Nottingham Panthers
Forward	David Beauregard	(Canada)	Nottingham Panthers

== 2012–2013 ==
First Team

Position	Player	Nationality	Team
Goaltender	Craig Kowalski	(United States)	Nottingham Panthers
Defence	Robby Sandrock	(Canada)	Belfast Giants
Defence	Michael Schutte	(Canada) (Netherlands)	Coventry Blaze
Forward	Mac Faulkner	(Canada)	Cardiff Devils
Forward	Jereme Tendler	(Canada)	Hull Stingrays
Forward	David Ling	(Canada)	Nottingham Panthers

Second Team

Position	Player	Nationality	Team
Goaltender	Nicola Riopel	(Canada)	Dundee Stars
Defence	Derek Keller	(Canada)	Fife Flyers
Defence	Eric Werner	(United States)	Nottingham Panthers
Forward	Bruce Graham	(Canada)	Nottingham Panthers
Forward	Sami Ryhanen	(Finland)	Dundee Stars
Forward	Ashley Goldie	(Canada)	Braehead Clan

== 2013–2014 ==
First Team

Position	Player	Nationality	Team
Goaltender	Dan Bakala	(Canada)	Dundee Stars
Defence	Calvin Elfring	(Canada)	Belfast Giants
Defence	Robby Sandrock	(Canada)	Belfast Giants
Forward	Ryan Ginand	(United States)	Coventry Blaze
Forward	Guillaume Doucet	(Canada)	Hull Stingrays
Forward	Kevin Saurette	(Canada)	Belfast Giants

Second Team

Position	Player	Nationality	Team
Goaltender	Stephen Murphy	(United Kingdom)	Belfast Giants
Defence	Tyson Marsh	(Canada)	Cardiff Devils
Defence	Rory Rawlyk	(Canada)	Dundee Stars
Forward	Nico Sacchetti	(United States)	Dundee Stars
Forward	Mac Faulkner	(Canada)	Cardiff Devils
Forward	Jeffrey Szwez	(Canada) (Germany)	Belfast Giants

== 2014–2015 ==
First Team

Position	Player	Nationality	Team
Goaltender	Brian Stewart	(Canada)	Coventry Blaze
Defence	Andrew Hotham	(Canada)	Cardiff Devils
Defence	Ben O'Connor	(United Kingdom) (Canada)	Sheffield Steelers
Forward	Joey Martin	(Canada)	Cardiff Devils
Forward	Michael Forney	(United States)	Sheffield Steelers
Forward	Mathieu Roy	(Canada)	Sheffield Steelers

Second Team

Position	Player	Nationality	Team
Goaltender	Kyle Jones	(Canada)	Braehead Clan
Defence	Scott Aarssen	(Canada)	Braehead Clan
Defence	Tyson Marsh	(Canada)	Cardiff Devils
Forward	Stefan Meyer	(Canada)	Braehead Clan
Forward	Leigh Salters	(Canada)	Braehead Clan
Forward	Brent Walton	(Canada)	Cardiff Devils

== 2015–2016 ==
First Team

Position	Player	Nationality	Team
Goaltender	Ben Bowns	(United Kingdom)	Cardiff Devils
Defence	Andrew Hotham	(Canada)	Cardiff Devils
Defence	Ben O'Connor	(United Kingdom) (Canada)	Sheffield Steelers
Forward	Joey Martin	(Canada)	Cardiff Devils
Forward	Tyler Mosienko	(Canada)	Sheffield Steelers
Forward	Juraj Kolnik	(Slovakia)	Nottingham Panthers

Second Team

Position	Player	Nationality	Team
Goaltender	Brian Stewart	(Canada)	Coventry Blaze
Defence	Paul Phillips	(United States)	Manchester Storm
Defence	Derrick Walser	(Canada)	Belfast Giants
Forward	James Desmarais	(Canada)	Belfast Giants
Forward	Mathew Sisca	(Canada) (Italy)	Manchester Storm
Forward	Mathieu Roy	(Canada)	Sheffield Steelers

== 2016–2017 ==
First Team

Position	Player	Nationality	Team
Goaltender	Ben Bowns	(United Kingdom)	Cardiff Devils
Defence	Andrew Hotham	(Canada)	Cardiff Devils
Defence	Jim Vandermeer	(Canada)	Belfast Giants
Forward	Joey Martin	(Canada)	Cardiff Devils
Forward	Mathieu Roy	(Canada)	Sheffield Steelers
Forward	Vinny Scarsella	(United States)	Dundee Stars

Second Team

Position	Player	Nationality	Team
Goaltender	Shane Owen	(Canada)	Fife Flyers
Defence	Felix-Antoine Poulin	(Canada)	Dundee Stars
Defence	Derrick Walser	(Canada)	Belfast Giants
Forward	Scott Pitt	(Canada)	Braehead Clan
Forward	Matt Beca	(Canada)	Braehead Clan
Forward	Blair Riley	(Canada)	Belfast Giants

== 2017–2018 ==
First Team

Position	Player	Nationality	Team
Goaltender	Ben Bowns	(United Kingdom)	Cardiff Devils
Defence	Jesse Craige	(Canada)	Guildford Flames
Defence	Andrew Hotham	(Canada)	Cardiff Devils
Forward	Mike Hammond	(United Kingdom) (Canada)	Manchester Storm
Forward	Joey Martin	(Canada)	Cardiff Devils
Forward	Sebastien Sylvestre	(Canada)	Belfast Giants

Second Team

Position	Player	Nationality	Team
Goaltender	Ervins Mustukovs	(Latvia)	Sheffield Steelers
Defence	Calle Ackered	(Sweden)	Guildford Flames
Defence	Mark Matheson	(Canada)	Sheffield Steelers
Forward	John Dunbar	(Canada)	Guildford Flames
Forward	Luke Moffatt	(United States) (Canada)	Manchester Storm
Forward	Marc-Olivier Vallerand	(Canada)	Coventry Blaze

== 2018–2019 ==
First Team

Position	Player	Nationality	Team
Goaltender	Tyler Beskorowany	(Canada)	Belfast Giants
Defence	Gleason Fournier	(Canada)	Cardiff Devils
Defence	Josh Roach	(Canada)	Belfast Giants
Forward	Joey Martin	(Canada)	Cardiff Devils
Forward	Darcy Murphy	(Canada)	Belfast Giants
Forward	Ben Lake	(Canada) (United Kingdom)	Coventry Blaze

Second Team

Position	Player	Nationality	Team
Goaltender	Ben Bowns	(United Kingdom)	Cardiff Devils
Defence	Calle Ackered	(Sweden)	Guildford Flames
Defence	Jesse Craige	(Canada)	Guildford Flames
Forward	Charles Linglet	(Canada)	Cardiff Devils
Forward	Kyle Baun	(Canada)	Belfast Giants
Forward	Patrick Dwyer	(United States)	Belfast Giants

== 2019–2020 ==
First Team

Position	Player	Nationality	Team
Goaltender	C.J. Motte	(United States)	Coventry Blaze
Defence	Gleason Fournier	(Canada)	Cardiff Devils
Defence	Mark Matheson	(Canada)	Nottingham Panthers
Forward	Joey Haddad	(Canada)	Cardiff Devils
Forward	Sam Herr	(United States)	Nottingham Panthers
Forward	Luke Ferrara	(United Kingdom)	Coventry Blaze

Second Team

Position	Player	Nationality	Team
Goaltender	Matt Ginn	(Canada)	Manchester Storm
Defence	Drydn Dow	(Canada)	Dundee Stars
Defence	Marek Troncinsky	(Czech Republic)	Sheffield Steelers
Forward	Brendan Connolly	(Canada) (United Kingdom)	Sheffield Steelers
Forward	Janne Laakkonen	(Finland)	Coventry Blaze
Forward	Marc-Olivier Vallerand	(Canada)	Sheffield Steelers

== 2021–2022 ==
First Team

Position	Player	Nationality	Team
Goaltender	Tyler Beskorowany	(Canada)	Belfast Giants
Defence	Griffin Reinhart	(Canada)	Belfast Giants
Defence	Jamal Watson	(Canada)	Guildford Flames
Forward	Scott Conway	(United Kingdom) (Canada)	Belfast Giants
Forward	J.J. Piccinich	(United States) (Croatia)	Belfast Giants
Forward	Marc-Olivier Vallerand	(Canada)	Sheffield Steelers

Second Team

Position	Player	Nationality	Team
Goaltender	Mac Carruth	(United States)	Cardiff Devils
Defence	Matthew Register	(Canada)	Cardiff Devils
Defence	Daine Todd	(Canada)	Sheffield Steelers
Forward	Charlie Combs	(United States)	Dundee Stars
Forward	Mathieu Roy	(Canada)	Glasgow Clan
Forward	Brodie Reid	(Canada)	Cardiff Devils

== 2022–2023 ==
First Team

Position	Player	Nationality	Team
Goaltender	Tyler Beskorowany	(Canada)	Belfast Giants
Defence	Marcus Crawford	(Canada)	Cardiff Devils
Defence	Gabe Bast	(Canada)	Belfast Giants
Forward	Scott Conway	(United Kingdom) (Canada)	Belfast Giants
Forward	Daniel Tedesco	(Canada)	Guildford Flames
Forward	David Goodwin	(United States)	Belfast Giants

Second Team

Position	Player	Nationality	Team
Goaltender	Matthew Greenfield	(United States)	Sheffield Steelers
Defence	Nathanael Halbert	(United Kingdom) (Canada)	Coventry Blaze
Defence	Ben O'Connor	(United Kingdom) (Canada)	Guildford Flames
Forward	Trevor Cox	(Canada)	Cardiff Devils
Forward	Brett Ferguson	(Canada)	Guildford Flames
Forward	Cole Sanford	(Canada)	Cardiff Devils

== 2023–2024 ==
First Team

Position	Player	Nationality	Team
Goaltender	Matthew Greenfield	(United States)	Sheffield Steelers
Defence	Marcus Crawford	(Canada)	Cardiff Devils
Defence	Kevin Tansey	(Canada)	Sheffield Steelers
Forward	Patrick Watling	(Canada)	Sheffield Steelers
Forward	Cole Sanford	(Canada)	Cardiff Devils
Forward	Mitchell Balmas	(Canada)	Sheffield Steelers

Second Team

Position	Player	Nationality	Team
Goaltender	Evan Weninger	(Canada)	Manchester Storm
Defence	Drydn Dow	(Canada)	Dundee Stars
Defence	Colton Saucerman	(United States)	Sheffield Steelers
Forward	Gary Haden	(Canada)	Glasgow Clan
Forward	Ryan Valentini	(Canada)	Dundee Stars
Forward	Spencer Naas	(United States)	Dundee Stars

== 2024–2025 ==
First Team

Position	Player	Nationality	Team
Goaltender	Matthew Greenfield	(United States)	Sheffield Steelers
Defence	Drydn Dow	(Canada)	Dundee Stars
Defence	Josh Roach	(Canada)	Belfast Giants
Forward	Alexis D'Aoust	(Canada)	Manchester Storm
Forward	Chase Gresock	(United States)	Coventry Blaze
Forward	Josh MacDonald	(Canada)	Cardiff Devils

Second Team

Position	Player	Nationality	Team
Goaltender	Jason Grande	(United States)	Nottingham Panthers
Defence	Dominic Cormier	(Canada)	Sheffield Steelers
Defence	Gabe Bast	(Canada)	Belfast Giants
Forward	Scott Conway	(United Kingdom) (Canada)	Belfast Giants
Forward	Alessio Luciani	(Canada)	Coventry Blaze
Forward	Nick Seitz	(United States)	Coventry Blaze

== 2025–2026 ==
First Team

Position	Player	Nationality	Team
Goaltender	Drew DeRidder	(United States)	Manchester Storm
Defence	Brandon Estes	(United States)	Cardiff Devils
Defence	Mike Lee	(United States)	Belfast Giants
Forward	J.J. Piccinich	(United States)	Belfast Giants
Forward	Tim Doherty	(United States)	Nottingham Panthers
Forward	Mitchell Balmas	(Canada)	Sheffield Steelers

Second Team

Position	Player	Nationality	Team
Goaltender	Mat Robson	(Canada) (United Kingdom)	Coventry Blaze
Defence	Nicholas Welsh	(Canada)	Manchester Storm
Defence	Jimmy Oligny	(Canada)	Cardiff Devils
Forward	Josh MacDonald	(Canada)	Cardiff Devils
Forward	Mathieu Gosselin	(Canada)	Guildford Flames
Forward	Jordan Kawaguchi	(Canada)	Belfast Giants
