= 1997 Sweden Hockey Games =

Tournament details
- Host country: Sweden
- City: Stockholm
- Venue: 1 (in 1 host city)
- Dates: 4-9 February 1997
- Teams: 5

Final positions
- Champions: Finland (1st title)
- Runners-up: Sweden
- Third place: Russia
- Fourth place: Canada

Tournament statistics
- Games played: 10
- Goals scored: 50 (5 per game)
- Attendance: 53,699 (5,370 per game)
- Scoring leader: (Sweden) Michael Nylander (7 points)

The 1997 Sweden Hockey Games was played between 4 and 9 February 1997 in Stockholm, Sweden. The Czech Republic, Finland, Sweden, Russia and Canada played a round-robin for a total of four games per team and 10 games in total. All of the games were played in the Globen in Stockholm, Sweden. The tournament was won by Finland. The tournament was part of 1996–97 Euro Hockey Tour.

Games against Canada was not included in the 1996–97 Euro Hockey Tour.

== Standings ==
Pos	Team	Pld	W	D	L	GF	GA	GD	Pts
1	Finland	4	4	0	0	18	5	+13	12
2	Sweden	4	2	0	2	12	10	+2	6
3	Russia	4	1	1	2	8	10	−2	4
4	Canada	4	1	1	2	6	8	−2	4
5	Czech Republic	4	1	0	3	6	17	−11	3

Source: swehockey

== Games ==
All times are local. Stockholm – (Central European Time – UTC+1)

4 February 1997	Finland	5-1 (2–0, 2–0, 1–1)	Russia	Globen, Stockholm; Attendance: 1,276

Game reference

Referee:
(Sweden) Börje Johansson

06:23 – Juha Lind	1-0
15:42 – Janne Ojanen (Petteri Nummelin)	2-0
32:45 – Sami Mettovaara (Antti Aalto, Marko Kiprussoff)	3-0
36:55 – Marko Kiprussoff (Hannu Virta, Esa Keskinen) (PP)	4-0
46:13 – Sami Mettovaara (Pasi Sormunen, Jarkko Varvio)	5-0
	5-1	57:40 – Aleksander Barkov (Sergei Fokin, Anatoli Fedotov) (PP)

12 min
Penalties
10 min
30
Shots
27

4 February 1997	Sweden	1-2 (0–1, 1–1, 0–0)	Canada	Globen, Stockholm; Attendance: 9,241

Game reference

Referee:
(Finland) Marko Lepaus

	0-1	15:55 – Rob Cowie (Sylvain Turgeon)
25:31 – Johan Lindbom (Magnus Svensson) (PP)	1-1
	1-2	32:47 – Dean Evason (Steve Junker, Jason Young)

6 min
Penalties
14 min
38
Shots
37

5 February 1997	Russia	1-1 (0–1, 0–0, 1–0)	Canada	Globen, Stockholm; Attendance: 874

Referees: (Czech Republic) (Czech Republic); Linesmen: (Finland) (Finland)

5 February 1997	Finland	5-0 (1–0, 3–0, 1–0)	Czech Republic	Globen, Stockholm; Attendance: 1,677

Referees: (Czech Republic) (Czech Republic); Linesmen: (Finland) (Finland)

6 February 1997	Sweden	6-3 (2–1, 3–1, 1–1)	Czech Republic	Globen, Stockholm; Attendance: 9,134

Game reference

Referee:
(Russia) Leonid Vaisfeld

	0-1	16:21 – Pavel Patera (Vítězslav Škuta)
18:40 – Per Eklund (Michael Nylander, Fredrik Öberg)	1-1
19:59 – Magnus Svensson (Niklas Sundblad) (PP)	2-1
23:44 – Per Eklund (Fredrik Öberg, Niclas Hävelid)	3-1
27:23 – Michael Nylander (Per Eklund) (PP)	4-1
33:05 – Patric Kjellberg (Roger Johansson, Magnus Svensson)	5-1
	5-2	28:59 – Martin Prochazka (František Kaberle, Pavel Patera) (PP)
	5-3	42:34 – Jiří Šlégr (Drahomír Kadlec, Pavel Patera) (PP)
54:57 – Jonas Bergqvist (Michael Nylander) (PP)	6-3

10 min
Penalties
14 min
33
Shots
15

7 February 1997	Finland	4-2 (1–0, 0–2, 3–0)	Canada	Globen, Stockholm; Attendance: 2,223

Referee: (Czech Republic)

7 February 1997	Sweden	3-1 (2–0, 1–1, 0–0)	Russia	Globen, Stockholm; Attendance: 11,321

Referees: (Czech Republic) (Czech Republic); Linesmen: (Finland) (Finland)

8 February 1997	Czech Republic	2-1 (0–0, 2–1, 0–0)	Canada	Globen, Stockholm; Attendance: 1,872

Game reference
			Referee: (Russia) Leonid Vaisfeld
20:18 – Pavel Patera (Vladimír Vůjtek); 34:37 – Vladimír Vůjtek (Roman Meluzín) / Goals / 22:59 – Dean Evason (Jeff Tory) (PP)			Referee: (Russia) Leonid Vaisfeld
8 min	Penalties	10 min	Referee: (Russia) Leonid Vaisfeld
36	Shots	18	Referee: (Russia) Leonid Vaisfeld

9 February 1997	Russia	5-1 (2–1, 3–0, 0–0)	Czech Republic	Globen, Stockholm; Attendance: 2,231

Game reference

Referee:
(Norway) Tor-Olov Johnsen

11:09 – Sergei Fokin (Sergei Petrenko, Anatoli Fedotov)	1-0
	1-1	16:13 – Pavel Patera (Ondřej Kratěna)
16:55 – Alexander Barkov (Sergei Fokin)	2-1
24:45 – Oleg Belov (Vyacheslav Butsayev)	3-1
33:57 – Alexei Morozov (Sergei Fokin, Alexander Barkov)	4-1
38:35 – Alexander Nesterov (Alexander Gorsjkov)	5-1

9 February 1997	Sweden	2-4 (1–1, 0–1, 1–2)	Finland	Globen, Stockholm; Attendance: 13,850

Game reference

Referee:
(Russia) Leonid Vaisfeld

07:20 – Per Eklund (Nichlas Falk, Michael Nylander)	1-0
	1-1	09:42 – arko Jantunen (Esa Keskinen)
	1-2	31:20 – Marko Jantunen (Pasi Sormunen)
	1-3	45:27 – uha Lind (Mika Strömberg) (PP)
50:15 – Kim Johnsson (Michael Nylander, Jonas Bergqvist)	2-3
	2-4	59:57 – Antti Aalto (Juha Lindh) (PP)

== Scoring leaders ==
Pos	Player	Country	GP	G	A	Pts	+/−	PIM	POS
1	Michael Nylander	Sweden	4	1	6	7	+1	0	F
2	Pavel Patera	Czech Republic	4	3	2	5	+-3	2	F
3	Marko Jantunen	Finland	4	4	0	4	+4	0	F
4	Juha Lind	Finland	4	3	1	4	+3	4	F
5	Sami Mettovaara	Finland	4	3	1	4	+3	6	F

GP = Games played; G = Goals; A = Assists; Pts = Points; +/− = Plus/minus; PIM = Penalties in minutes; POS = Position
Source: quanthockey

== Goaltending leaders ==
Pos	Player	Country	TOI	GA	GAA	Sv%	SO
1	Jarmo Myllys	Finland	120:00	2	1.0	97.80	1
2	Jani Hurme	Finland	120:00	3	1.50	93.90	0
3	Andrew Verner	Canada	237:00	8	2.00	94.10	0
4	Sergey Fateev	Russia	120:00	4	2.00	92.70	0
5	Johan Hedberg	Sweden	180:00	7	2.33	91.40	0
6	Maxim Mikhailovsky	Russia	120:00	6	3.00	90.50	0
7	Milan Hnilička	Czech Republic	140:00	7	2.33	86.80	0
8	Martin Prusek	Czech Republic	100:00	10	5.00	82.10	0
9	Mikael Sandberg	Sweden	60:00	3	3.00	80.00	0

TOI = Time on ice (minutes:seconds); SA = Shots against; GA = Goals against; GAA = Goals Against Average; Sv% = Save percentage; SO = Shutouts
Source: swehockey

== Tournament awards ==
The tournament directorate named the following players in the tournament 1997:

- Best goalkeeper: (Canada) Andrew Verner
- Best defenceman: (Finland) Hannu Virta
- Best forward: (Sweden) Michael Nylander

Media All-Star Team:

- Goaltender: (Canada) Andrew Verner
- Defence: (Finland) Hannu Virta, (Sweden) Roger Johansson
- Forwards: (Finland) Sami Mettivaara, (Sweden) Michael Nylander, (Sweden) Per Eklund
