= Nyquist (surname) =

Nyquist is a surname of Swedish origin. Nyquist and the alternatively spelled Nyqvist are derivates from the original spelling that is Nykvist, meaning "New Branch". Notable people with the surname include:

- Ann-Christin Nyquist (born 1948), Swedish Social Democratic politician
- Arild Nyquist (1937–2004), Norwegian novelist, lyricist, writer and musician
- Dean Nyquist (1935–2014), American politician
- Gustav Nyquist (born 1989), Swedish ice hockey player, currently in the NHL.
- Harry Nyquist (1889–1976), Swedish-American electronic engineer
- John W. Nyquist (1933–2021), retired American Navy vice admiral
- Kari Nyquist (1918–2011), Norwegian ceramist, freelance artist and designer
- Laurence E. Nyquist (born 1939), American planetary scientist
- Lee Nyquist, American politician
- Michael Nyqvist (1960–2017), Swedish actor
- Ove Nyquist Arup (1895–1988), Anglo-Danish architectural engineer, founder of engineering firm Arup
- Paul Nyquist, president of the Moody Bible Institute in Chicago, IL
- Ryan Nyquist (born 1979), American cyclist and motocross rider
- Seth Nyquist alias MorMor (born 1992), Canadian singer-songwriter
