= Enqvist =

Enqvist is a Swedish surname, present mainly in Sweden and in Finland. Alternate spellings include Enquist and Enkvist.

== Notable people ==
Notable people who have this surname include:

- Björn Morgan Enqvist (born 1977), Swedish footballer
- Daniel Enqvist (born 2001), Finnish footballer
- Kari Enqvist (born 1954), Finnish cosmologist
- Oskar Enqvist (1849–1912), Russian admiral
- Simon Enqvist (born 1988), Finnish football player
- Thomas Enqvist (born 1974), Swedish tennis player

== See also ==
- Enquist
