= Krajíček =

Krajíček (feminine Krajíčková) is a Czech and Slovak surname. Notable people with the surname include:

- Austin Krajicek (born 1990), American tennis player, and a distant cousin of Richard
- Jan Krajíček (born 1971), Czech ice hockey player
- Lukáš Krajíček (born 1983), Czech ice hockey player
- Michaëlla Krajicek, (born 1989), Dutch tennis player, and the younger half-sister of Richard Krajicek
- Richard Krajicek (born 1971), Dutch tennis player
