= Heikki Laine =

Heikki Laine may refer to:

- Heikki Laine (ice hockey), a Finnish former professional ice hockey forward
- Heikki Laine (rower), a Finnish rower
