= Sormunen =

Sormunen is a Finnish surname. Notable people with the surname include:

- Ilmari Sormunen (1896–1980), Finnish farmer and politician
- Pasi Sormunen (born 1970), Finnish professional ice hockey player
- Aileen Geving (born 1987), née Sormunen, American curler
- Oona Sormunen (born 1989), Finnish javelin thrower
