= Edinburgh Capitals =

Scottish ice hockey club

- City: Edinburgh, Scotland
- League: Scottish National League
- Founded: 1998
- Operated: 1998–2018; 2022–present
- Home arena: Murrayfield Ice Rink
- Colours: White, navy, maroon
- Head coach: Steven Lynch
- Captain: Joel Gautschi
- Website: www.edcapitals.com

The Edinburgh Capitals are a Scottish ice hockey club, playing in the Scottish National League (SNL). They are based in the Scottish capital, Edinburgh. The team play at the Murrayfield Ice Rink, close to Murrayfield Rugby stadium.

In April 2018, a consortium led by David Hand (brother of ex-Racer Tony) won the contract for ice time at Murrayfield, effectively rendering the Capitals homeless.

The newly formed Murrayfield Racers applied to join the EIHL and take the Capitals' place but were rejected, plunging the future of top level ice hockey in the city into jeopardy.

The Racers were subsequently accepted into the Scottish National League (SNL) instead, where they remained until 2022.

However, in July 2022, four years after the Capitals had folded, it was announced that Murrayfield Ice Rink had new management and that the Edinburgh Capitals would return to play in the Scottish National League.

== History ==
=== BNL years ===
The Edinburgh Capitals were founded in 1998, following the collapse of the Murrayfield Royals, replacing them in the British National League (BNL).

The first three seasons for the new Edinburgh team were largely unsuccessful, finishing 8th out of 9 in their inaugural season (ahead of the Paisley Pirates), 8th out of 10 in their second season (ahead of the Milton Keynes Kings and the Pirates), and 9th out of 10 in their third season (finishing once again ahead of the Pirates).

The Capitals would receive a massive boost for the 2001–02 season, with the signings of former NHLer, Jason Lafreniere, and SM-Liiga player, Roland Carlsson. That year the club finished seventh out of 12, with Lafreniere amassing 88 points in 44 games. The following summer saw Lafreniere leave the Capitals to join league rivals, the Guildford Flames.

Over the following three seasons, the club developed a European style of hockey, recruiting most of their imports from Slovakia and the Czech Republic. Among those included fan favourites, Jan Krajíček, Ladislav Kudrna, Peter Konder and long-serving captain, Martin Cingel. The 2002–03 season also marked the arrival of the popular, Elmira College graduates, Steven Kaye and Adrian Saul. The club once again made a mid-table finish, ending the season in 6th place out of 10.

The 2003–04 season saw the Capitals make a blockbuster signing. Former Murrayfield Racers legend and league winning player and coach, Tony Hand, would be returning to Edinburgh after leaving the Dundee Stars. Under Hand, the Capitals would accomplish their best ever league position, finishing third out of seven and for the first time, make the playoff semi-finals. The forward line of Hand, Saul and Kaye would top the scoring charts, with the trio finishing as first, second and third top point scorers in the league. Adrian Saul would also finish as the league's top goal scorer, with 31 goals in 35 games.

The 2004–05 season was a very disappointing one for the club. During the summer, the league's deadliest line from the previous season was split up, with Hand signing for the Elite League's Belfast Giants, Steven Kaye moving to French side Morzine-Avoriaz, and Adrian Saul moving to the club's biggest rivals, the Fife Flyers. Ladislav Kudrna, the team's goalie from the previous two seasons would also switch teams, moving to Yorkshire based Hull Stingrays. The Capitals would finish this season in last place, recording only six wins, making it the club's worst season in the league.

=== The step up to the EIHL ===
==== Early EIHL seasons ====
Following the 2004–05 British National League season, the Capitals and Newcastle Vipers applied to join the Elite Ice Hockey League, however both clubs withdrew their offers to make a joint application with the other remaining BNL clubs. Terms could not be reached between the Elite League and the BNL teams, so the Capitals and Vipers returned to their initial offers. Both clubs were accepted into the Elite League for the 2005–06 season. The BNL subsequently disbanded and the remaining teams moved into other leagues.

This season saw the return of Tony Hand as player/coach, after taking the Giants to a 2nd-place finish during the previous year. In the regular season, the team finished last with 23 points in 42 games. Due to the London Racers folding mid-season, the Capitals made the playoffs by default and were placed in a group with Nottingham Panthers, Sheffield Steelers and eventual 2005–06 playoff champions, Newcastle Vipers. The team finished bottom of the group with two points in six playoff games.

For the 2006–07 season, Scott Neil took over as head coach after Hand signed as player/coach for the league newcomers, Manchester Phoenix. In the regular season, the team finished tied for last place with Hull Stingrays, with 39 points in 54 games.

In the summer of 2007, the club made the announcement that 29 year old, American forward, Doug Christiansen, would be the team's player/coach for the 2007–08 season. Under Christiansen, the Capitals qualified for the Elite League Playoffs for the first time, finishing 8th in the league and picking up 41 points. They were seeded against League champions, Coventry Blaze, who defeated the Capitals 1–0 at Murrayfield and 3–2 at the SkyDome Arena (4–2 on aggregate) at the Quarter Final stage of the competition.

Christiansen was re-signed by the Capitals for season 2008–09, however the team struggled near the foot of the table for the first half of the season. The Capitals showed dramatic improvement in the latter stages and qualified for a playoff position by finishing 8th for the second year in a row. League champions, Sheffield Steelers, defeated the Capitals 8–2 in the Quarter Final first leg, with the Capitals defeating the Steelers 5–4 at Murrayfield in the return leg (12–7 on aggregate). This season was notable in particular for the skill and contribution of Mark Hurtubise, who finished as the league's top point scorer, recording 89 points in 54 games. Hurtubise also made the Elite League All-Star Team.

Christiansen's 3rd season in charge was injury plagued, losing key players throughout the season, including himself with a shattered kneecap in the first game of the season. But the Capitals showed their battling qualities and set a new franchise record for number of points in a season (52). They finished 6th in league setting another franchise record. This led to Christiansen being awarded Coach of the Year by the IHJUK. They played the Nottingham Panthers in the playoffs and got a respectable 4–4 draw at home in the first leg but were defeated 5–0 in the second leg (9–4 on aggregate).

==== 2010–11 season and management changes ====
Following the departure of Steve Thornton as coach, the Belfast Giants swiftly appointed Christiansen as coach for the 2010–11 season. On 1 July 2010, it was announced that Brad Gratton would replace Christiansen as head coach of the Edinburgh Capitals.

The 2010–11 season was an especially difficult one for the Capitals, which saw Gratton resign from his role as head coach after only four months in the job. It was announced that club owner and general manager, Scott Neil, would take over as head coach for the remainder of the season. This was, however, followed by a string of eight import players leaving the Capitals over the course of the season due to club financial difficulties. The Capitals lost the remainder of their games (most of them heavy defeats) and finished the season bottom of the Elite League. They recorded only six wins and 15 points and failed to make the playoffs, making it the club's worst season to date.

There was further uncertainty when it was announced on 5 June 2011, that after nine seasons with the Edinburgh Capitals, loyal club captain, Martin Cingel, was moving on to the Manchester Phoenix of the English Premier Ice Hockey League.

After 13 years as sole owner of the club, it was announced that there would be a restructuring of management. Local businessmen Raymond Lumsden and Matthew Tailford would be joining Scott Neil as co-owners – forming a management team which would also include the Capitals Webmaster, Keith Butland.

On 26 September 2011, it was announced that Scott Neil would be stepping down as general manager of the club, and would be replaced by business advisor, Len Wilcox. It was revealed that Neil would remain at the club as co-owner and Hockey Director. It later transpired that negotiations with Wilcox and Lumsden had broken down and that neither would be involved with the club.

However, on 5 October 2011 it was announced that Matthew Tailford would be taking up the additional role of general manager. A further addition to the management team was announced on 27 January 2012 as George Ferdinando would become the latest shareholder of the club.

==== 2011–12 season ====
On 16 August 2011 it was announced that experienced, Slovak forward, Richard Hartmann, had signed for the Capitals for the 2011–12 season. It was confirmed on 24 August that he would also take on the role of head coach, becoming the club's first European coach.

Under Hartmann, the club would once again return to a predominantly European style of hockey, signing all but one of their imports from Slovakia, Czech Republic or Latvia – something unique to the Elite League. After a promising first half of the season, the club suffered a string of injuries and a loss of momentum, which resulted in the team finishing in 9th place and, once again, failing to make the playoffs. The season went out with a bang however, with the last game being against the old enemy, Fife Flyers, who had finished bottom in the league. The game finished 11–3 in favour of the Capitals, but was also notable for the number of fights and incidents, including a bench clearance, a player's jersey being thrown into the Fife support, and several players being thrown out of the game.

It was announced on 22 December 2011 that Richard Hartmann had agreed terms to return as player/head coach for the 2012–13 season. This positive news was followed on 5 February 2011 with the announcement that fan favourite, and league top goalscorer, René Jarolín, would also return for the 2012–13 season. Jarolín would be rewarded for his season's effort by being named to the EIHL Second All-Star Team.

==== 2012–13 season ====
The 2012 off-season saw several key changes to the lineup, with the previous season's captain, Jan Safar, moving to Kazakh club HC Gornyak and alternate captain, Bari McKenzie, moving to Cardiff Devils. Frazer Goldie, who had spent part of the previous season with the club on a two-way contract, joined full-time from Solway Sharks and Willie Nicolson re-joined the club after spending a season with rivals Fife Flyers. Hartmann also continued to recruit from Europe, signing promising Slovak goalie, Tomáš Hiadlovský, and experienced defender, Michal Dobroň, who had previously played nearly 600 games in the Czech Extraliga. On 3 September, it was announced that club legend, Martin Cingel, would be returning to the Capitals and would once again take over the role as captain.

The Capitals had a slow start to the campaign, spending the first couple of months in the bottom two of the league. The team roster was strengthened in November, however, when the Canadian duo Curtis Leinweber and Brent Patry joined from Chinook Hockey League side Sylvan Lake Admirals and Italian Serie A2 side HC Neumarkt-Egna, respectively. The return of alternate captain, Jade Portwood, who had been injured earlier in the season, also gave a boost to the club. The Capitals would go on to beat every team in the league at least once, and finish the season in a respectable 6th place – making the playoffs for the first time in three years. The Capitals faced Doug Christiansen's Belfast Giants at the Quarter Final stage. The first leg took place at the Odyssey Arena and finished 3–1 in favour of the Giants. The return leg saw the Giants progress to the semi-finals after beating the Capitals 4–3 at Murrayfield (7–4 on aggregate). The Giants would finish as playoff runners-up, losing to Treble winners, Nottingham Panthers.

René Jarolín was named for the second year in a row to the EIHL Second All-Star Team, while Richard Hartmann was named as Coach of the Year.

==== 2013–14 season ====
After a positive 2012–13 season, the club looked to retain as much of the team as possible during the off-season. Player/head coach, Richard Hartmann, and forward Peter Holečko returned for their third consecutive season, while other key returnees included captain, Martin Cingel, alternative captain, Jade Portwood, goalie, Tomáš Hiadlovský, Canadian forward, Curtis Leinweber, and Slovak defenceman, Michal Benadik. It was announced that after spending the previous season in Kazakhstan, former captain, Jan Safar, would also return to the Capitals.

René Jarolín, who finished as the club's top point scorer for the previous two seasons, would move back to Slovakia to join HC Dukla Senica. Other departures included Michal Dobroň and Brent Patry signing for French clubs Morzine-Avoriaz and Chamonix.

New additions to the club included Canadian centre, Les Reaney, who joined from the Wichita Thunder of the Central Hockey League and Czech duo, Tomáš Horna, who previously played for Beibarys Atyrau and Martin Lučka, who spent the previous season with Piráti Chomutov of the Czech Extraliga.

After a poor start to the 2013–14 season, the club announced on 29 September that Michal Dobroň would be returning to the Capitals, signing a new two-year deal. Dobroň had previously left Morzine-Avoriaz after picking up an injury in pre-season. Head coach Richard Hartmann described the signing as "one of the biggest signings I've made for this club... To secure Michal's services for two years is tremendous".

Despite the importance of Dobron's return, the club continued to struggle. Further changes to the roster saw Reaney, Lučka and Horna leave the club midseason, while Latvian winger Mārcis Zembergs returned to the club and Czech forward, Jaroslav Cesky, joined from the Cardiff Devils. The team's fortunes failed to improve after the roster shuffle, and the Capitals finished the season in last place by some distance. Curtis Leinweber would finish as the club's top point scorer, with 57 points in 51 games.

One bright spot of the season saw the Edinburgh Capitals (SNL) team win the grand-slam after finishing 1st in the Scottish National League, and winning both the Playoff and Scottish Cup championships.

==== 2014–15 season ====
After the disappointment of the 2013–14 season, Hartmann renewed his contract with the Capitals for a fourth season as player-coach, with the promise that the team would be competitive in the future. During the offseason, the club would proceed with a clear out of the roster and implement a new hybrid style of play, with half the team's import players being from Europe and the other half from North America. The only import players to return for the 2014–15 season would be goalie, Tomáš Hiadlovský, and newly promoted captain, Jade Portwood. Both players would be in their third season with the club. Former Elite League all-star, René Jarolín, would also re-join after spending a season back in Slovakia.

As part of their new approach, the Capitals looked for players recently out of college or junior hockey, signing Swedish forward (and former college teammate of Portwood and Leinweber), Daniel Näslund; Canadian winger, Dennis Rix; American, and 6'7" Canadian defenceman, Kyle Flemington. To add more pro-experience to the team, the club looked to American forward, Greg Collins; 6’8" Canadian forward, Riley Emmerson; former Nottingham defenceman, Joe Grimaldi; and the Slovak defensive pair, Lukáš Bohunický and Marcel Petran. After the retirement of long-serving Scottish players, Neil Hay and Daniel McIntyre, the club signed Callum Boyd from Kilmarnock Storm and James Wallace from Solway Sharks (on a five-year contract) as replacements.

Despite the change of style, the 2014–15 season would prove to be an inconsistent one for the club. An early losing streak, followed by a strong points streak in November and early December, was again, followed by another losing streak which stretched into late January. Ultimately, the Capitals would finish the season in 9th place, missing out on the playoffs by 1 point. René Jarolín once again finished the season as the club's top goal and point scorer, with 30 goals and 56 points in 53 games.

Several notable events occurred during the season, including: Emmerson receiving a controversial 10 game ban after only his first game at the club; Grimaldi being released from the club after spearing Nottingham defenceman, Evan Mosey, throwing his helmet at Mosey's face, and sucker-punching him; the addition of American defenceman, Loren Barron to the team, and return of Slovak defenceman, Michal Benadik; and beating the Giants 6–4 in Belfast - their first win at the Odyssey in nine seasons.

==== 2015–16 season ====
After four seasons at the Capitals, it was announced on 6 April 2015 that Richard Hartmann would be stepping down as the club's player-coach. Eight days later, it was confirmed that fan favourite and former Minnesota Wild draft selection, Riley Emmerson, would return to the club after being appointed player-coach for the 2015–16 season. On the announcement of his return, Emmerson stated that his goal for the club was to "[change] the culture of the Edinburgh Capitals and I want to bring guys in who want to better the club, better themselves as players and to better themselves as people, while they wear a Capitals jersey."

Emmerson's first offseason as coach saw a clear out of the previous season's roster, with defenceman Kyle Flemington being the only other import to return for the 2015–16 season. After three seasons at the club, goalie Tomáš Hiadlovský would leave to join Basingstoke Bison of the English Premier Ice Hockey League. The club's top point-scorer from the previous season, René Jarolín, would also move to the EPIHL, signing for Milton Keynes Lightning. Although initially agreeing to re-sign for the Capitals, defenceman Loren Barron announced that he would be retiring to pursue a career outside of ice hockey. Other retirees from the 2014–15 season included forwards Dennis Rix, Jade Portwood, Greg Collins and Daniel Naslund.

Emmerson's recruitment during the summer brought about a change in on-ice philosophy, with the club signing players familiar with the more high-tempo and physical North American style of play. Forwards Everett Sheen and David Rutherford, alongside defenceman, Kyle Bigos, would join the Capitals from the ECHLs Ontario Reign; whilst defenceman Jacob Johnston and forward Ryan Hayes would sign from former league rivals, Utah Grizzlies. First year pros Taylor Dickin, Nate Fleming, and Craig McCallum would join the club from the universities of Manitoba, British Columbia, and Saskatchewan, respectively. Other key recruits included forwards Trevor Gerling from the Elmira Jackals, Paul Zanette (on a two-year contract) from Italian club HC Bolzano; and goalie Carsen Chubak, who would sign from fellow Elite League club, Belfast Giants.

It was announced on 14 October 2015 that newly named club captain, Everett Sheen, would be leaving the club with immediate effect. Alternate captain, Paul Zanette, was later chosen as the new captain of the Capitals. On 10 November 2015, Canadian forward Brandon Coccimiglio – a former teammate of Rutherford – joined the club as the replacement player for Sheen. The Capitals had to deal with the departures of Ryan Hayes and David Rutherford, while Nate Fleming would also leave for personal reasons. Ned Lukacevic, Ņikita Koļesņikovs, Brandon Thompson, Garrett Milan and RJay Berra would later join the club but the Capitals would finish bottom in a hugely disappointing 10th place, despite a strong start to the season, thus missing the play-offs. Emmerson would later leave the club and retire from hockey after one season as player-coach while club stalwart David Beatson, the Capitals' longest-serving player, would retire after eighteen years with the team.

==== 2016–17 season ====
After the retirement of player-coach Riley Emmerson after one season in the role and two as a member of the Capitals, the club appointed Michal Dobroň in May 2016 as their new player-coach for the 2016–17 season. Dobroň had previously been a Capitals player between 2012 and 2014.

Dobroň began his recruitment early by signing Canadian centre Taylor MacDougall from the University of New Brunswick, forward Mason Wilgosh from the University of Prince Edward Island, and his former teammate Karel Hromas from HC Morzine in France.

He then added defenceman Michael D'Orazio from St Mary's University in Canada and D'Orazio's former St Mary's teammate, forward Matt Tipoff.

The marquee signing by the Capitals was arguably former NHL first-round draft pick, forward Pavel Vorobyev. The Capitals continued their recruitment with the signing of former Carolina Hurricanes forward Jared Staal in July 2016, netminder Travis Fullerton and forwards Yevgeni Fyodorov and one-time NHL draft-pick Ian Schultz. The roster was completed in early September with the signings of Latvian defenceman Rihards Grigors following a successful trial with the team and Czech defenceman Jaroslav Hertl, the brother of current Vegas Golden Knights forward Tomáš Hertl. Netminder Jordan Marr would later join from the Hull Pirates of the EPIHL initially on a short-term loan, before signing permanently in early 2017 on a deal until the end of the season.

Having been eliminated from the Challenge Cup at the quarter-final stage by Sheffield Steelers (the first time the Capitals had ever made it out of the group stage of the competition), a pair of defeats at Murrayfield to the Nottingham Panthers in consecutive days in March 2017 rendered the Caps unable to qualify for the 2016–17 Elite League playoffs. It was the fourth consecutive season that the Capitals have failed to make the post-season. Pavel Vorobyev finished as the Capitals' top scorer in all competitions, tallying 58 points in 60 games.

==== 2017–18: The club's final EIHL season ====
After confirming their place in the expanded 12-team Elite League following the adoption of a three-conference structure, the Capitals began their search for a new coach following the departure of Michal Dobroň on 17 May 2017. Dobroň left the Scottish capital to sign for Brest (as player-assistant coach) following one season as Edinburgh's player-coach.

On 9 June 2017, the Edinburgh Capitals pulled off something of a coup to land former NHL all-star Dmitri Khristich as their new head coach. Khristich had played over 800 NHL games and had coached in the KHL, becoming Edinburgh's first bench coach since Brad Gratton in 2010.

The club quickly confirmed that fan favourite Pavel Vorobyev had agreed to return for a second season with the team, before news that Khristich was being assisted in his recruitment and scouting by two former NHLers in Darius Kasparaitis and Khristich's former Washington Capitals teammate Andrei Nikolishin.

The first new import signing was confirmed on 23 June 2017 with the capture of centre Mike Cazzola, the 2016–17 top ECHL rookie points scorer, on a two-year deal from Fort Wayne Komets.

Despite the renewed optimism, however, the on-ice fortunes quickly unraveled from October after Duncan Speirs, Taylor Stefishen and Julius Nyqvist were released by the club - quickly followed by Alexander Islamov - with the Capitals embarking on a desperate run of 13 consecutive defeats before their second league victory of the season arrived with a win against Coventry on 19 November 2017. To compound their predicament, the club suffered the added blow of losing top scorer Marek Tvrdoň who requested to be released owing to a family illness.

In December 2017, things went from bad to worse for the club when Khristich left the Capitals by mutual consent with the club cut adrift at the bottom of the league. Captain Michael D'Orazio and long-time bench coach Jock Hay were confirmed as the interim coaches for the foreseeable future charged with the unenviable task of turning around the on-ice fortunes.

The Capitals would finish with their worst-ever record in the Elite League era, finishing 12th with just five wins from 56 games and with only 11 points to their name.

The 2017/18 season proved to be the final EIHL season for the Capitals after the team lost the Murrayfield Ice Rink ice-time contract to a rival bid, under the Murrayfield Racers name, led by David Hand in April 2018.

=== Capitals return and join the SNL ===
==== 2022–23 season ====
In July 2022 it was announced by the new management of Murrayfield Ice Rink (which will henceforth be known as Murrayfield Ice Arena), that the Edinburgh Capitals would be making a return and they would be joining the Scottish National League (SNL). Former Capitals captain Steven Lynch was named Head Coach.

== Current roster ==
Squad for 2025–26 SNL season

* Denotes two-way deal with Elite Ice Hockey League side Fife Flyers

Goaltenders
No.		Player	Catches	Acquired	Place of Birth	Joined from	Press Release
13	(Scotland)	Ciaran Hoggan	L	2023	Scotland	Kirkcaldy Kestrels, SNL
34	(Scotland)	Ben Keddie*	L	2025	Kirkcaldy, Scotland	Blackburn Hawks, NIHL 1
88	(Scotland)	Jonnie Livingstone	L	2025	Scotland	Murrayfield U19, Scotland U19

Defencemen
No.		Player	Shoots	Acquired	Place of Birth	Joined from	Press Release
3	(Scotland)	Dean Walker	L	2022	Scotland	Murrayfield Racers, SNL
7	(Scotland)	Cameron Wilkie*	R	2024	Scotland	Blackburn Hawks, NIHL 1
18	(Scotland)	Ben Coughtrie	L	2022	Irvine, Scotland	Solway Sharks, NIHL 1
19	(Scotland)	Rhys Stenhouse	L	2022	Scotland	Fife Falcons, Scotland U19
22	(Scotland)	Aiden Paterson A	R	2022	Airdrie, Scotland	Murrayfield Racers, SNL
27	(Canada)	Sean Stewart	L	2025	Antigonish, Canada	St. Francis Xavier X-Men, U Sports
33	(Scotland)	Scott Geddes	R	2023	Kirkcaldy, Scotland	Dundee Comets, NIHL 1
50	(Scotland)	Charlie McLoughlin-Hanna	L	2025	Scotland	Murrayfield U19, Scotland U19
78	(Latvia)	Rihards Grigors	L	2024	Dobele, Latvia	Whitley Warriors, NIHL 1

Forwards
No.		Player	Position	Acquired	Place of Birth	Joined from	Press Release
8	(Northern Ireland) (Republic of Ireland)	Adam Robinson	F	2024	Belfast, Northern Ireland	Whitley Warriors, NIHL 1
9	(Scotland)	Cameron Gallagher	LW/RW	2022	Livingston, Scotland	Murrayfield U19, Scotland U19
10	(Scotland)	Sean Cochrane A	C	2022	Kirkcaldy, Scotland	Kirkcaldy Kestrels, SNL
16	(Scotland)	Conner McNulty	C	2025	Irvine, Scotland	Billingham Stars, NIHL 1
20	(Scotland)	Aaron Robertson	C	2022	Kirkcaldy, Scotland	Kirkcaldy Kestrels, SNL
24	(Scotland)	Kyle Howie	F	2025	Kirkcaldy, Scotland	North Ayrshire Wild, SNL
25	(Scotland)	Ross Dalgleish	C/RW	2022	Edinburgh, Scotland	No Team
34	(Scotland)	Joe Lynch A	F	2022	Kirkcaldy, Scotland	Dundee Stars (U16), Scotland U16
37	(Scotland)	Chad Smith	F	2022	Kirkcaldy, Scotland	Kirkcaldy Kestrels, SNL
43	(Scotland)	Justin Finnigan	F	2025	Scotland	Murrayfield U19, Scotland U19
47	(Switzerland) (Scotland)	Joel Gautschi C	C	2022	Switzerland	Dundee Comets, SNL
68	(Scotland)	Lukas James	F	2025	Scotland	Murrayfield U19, Scotland U19
90	(Scotland)	Kris Phillips	C/RW	2024	Dundee, Scotland	Dundee Tigers, SNL

Coaching Staff
No.		Name	Position	Place of Birth	Joined from	Press Release
N/A	(Scotland)	Steven Lynch	Head coach	Kirkcaldy, Scotland	Appointed in 2022
37	(Scotland)	Chad Smith	Player/Assistant coach	Kirkcaldy, Scotland	Appointed in 2025

Recent departures
No.	Player	Position	Acquired	Current Status	Press Release

== Club records ==
=== Season-by-season records ===
Edinburgh Capitals season-by-season record

Season	League	GP	W	L	T	OTL	PTS	GF	GA	League Position
1998–99	British National League	32	9	20	0	3	21	112	185	8th
1999–00	British National League	36	10	25	0	1	21	118	192	8th
2000–01	British National League	36	6	27	0	3	15	130	246	9th
2001–02	British National League	44	20	23	1	0	41	180	212	7th
2002–03	British National League	36	19	15	0	2	40	119	125	6th
2003–04	British National League	36	19	13	2	2	42	143	117	3rd
2004–05	British National League	38	6	29	1	2	15	102	189	8th
2005–06	Elite Ice Hockey League	42	9	28	2	3	23	118	187	8th
2006–07	Elite Ice Hockey League	54	18	33	0	3	39	160	222	10th
2007–08	Elite Ice Hockey League	54	19	32	0	3	41	160	222	8th
2008–09	Elite Ice Hockey League	54	19	29	0	6	44	179	243	8th
2009–10	Elite Ice Hockey League	56	22	26	0	8	52	177	224	6th
2010–11	Elite Ice Hockey League	54	6	45	0	3	15	134	418	10th
2011–12	Elite Ice Hockey League	54	13	37	0	4	30	133	265	9th
2012–13	Elite Ice Hockey League	52	22	26	0	4	48	149	184	6th
2013–14	Elite Ice Hockey League	52	13	36	0	3	27	134	227	10th
2014–15	Elite Ice Hockey League	52	20	26	0	6	46	135	215	9th
2015–16	Elite Ice Hockey League	52	10	37	0	5	25	153	287	10th
2016–17	Elite Ice Hockey League	52	16	33	0	3	35	154	225	10th
2017–18	Elite Ice Hockey League	56	5	50	0	1	11	118	331	12th
2022-23	Scottish National League	28	18	8	0	2	38	123	91	2nd
2023-24	Scottish National League	28	20	8	0	0	40	129	91	2nd
2024-25	Scottish National League	24	17	4	0	0	37	135	67	2nd
2025-26	Scottish National League	32	27	4	0	1	55	198	63	1st

Note: GP = Games played; W = Wins; L = Losses; T = Ties; OTL = Overtime losses; PTS = Points; GF = Goals for; GA = Goals against

=== Elite Ice Hockey League record ===
Edinburgh Capitals EIHL Cup and Conference record
Season	League		Conference		Playoff	Challenge Cup
2005–06	EIHL	8th			Group	Group
2006–07	EIHL	10th				Group
2007–08	EIHL	8th			QF	Group
2008–09	EIHL	8th			QF	Group
2009–10	EIHL	6th			QF	Group
2010–11	EIHL	10th				Group
2011–12	EIHL	9th				Group
2012–13	EIHL	6th	Gardiner	5th	QF	Group
2013–14	EIHL	10th	Gardiner	5th		Group
2014–15	EIHL	9th	Gardiner	4th		Group
2015–16	EIHL	10th	Gardiner	5th		Group
2016–17	EIHL	10th	Gardiner	5th		QF
2017–18	EIHL	12th	Gardiner	4th		Group

== Player and coaching records ==
=== Head coaches ===
- 1998–1999: (Scotland) David MacLean
- 1999–2000: (Canada) (Italy) Angelo Catenaro
- 2000–2001: (Scotland) Jock Hay
- 2001–2003: (Scotland) Scott Neil
- 2003–2004: (Scotland) Tony Hand
- 2004–2005: (Scotland) Scott Neil
- 2005–2006: (Scotland) Tony Hand
- 2006–2007: (Scotland) Scott Neil
- 2007–2010: (United States) Doug Christiansen
- 2010: (Canada) Brad Gratton
- 2010–2011: (Scotland) Scott Neil
- 2011–2015: (Slovakia) Richard Hartmann
- 2015–2016: (Canada) Riley Emmerson
- 2016–2017: (Czech Republic) Michal Dobroň
- 2017: (Ukraine) Dmitri Khristich
- 2017–2018: (Canada) Michael D'Orazio & Jock Hay (Scotland) (interim coaches)
- 2022–: (Scotland) Steven Lynch

=== Club captains ===
- 1998–1999: (Canada) Doug Marsden
- 1999–2000: (Canada) Jason Heywood
- 2000–2005: (Scotland) Steven Lynch
- 2005–2006: (Canada) Jim Vickers
- 2006–2011: (Slovakia) Martin Cingel
- 2011–2012: (Czech Republic) Jan Safar
- 2012–2014: (Slovakia) Martin Cingel
- 2014–2015: (Canada) Jade Portwood
- 2015: (Canada) Everett Sheen
- 2015–2016: (Canada) (Italy) Paul Zanette
- 2016–2017: (Canada) Jacob Johnston
- 2017–2018: (Canada) Michael D'Orazio
- 2022–: (Switzerland) (Scotland) Joel Gautschi

=== Most games played for the club ===
Player	POS	GP	G	A	Pts
(Scotland) Neil Hay	RW	499	44	91	135
(Slovakia) Martin Cingel	RW	482	177	258	435
(Scotland) Jordan Steel	C	405	14	17	31
(Scotland) Daniel McIntyre	D	354	4	21	25
(Scotland) Steven Lynch	LW	255	73	117	190
(Scotland) David Beatson	D	230	1	0	1
(Scotland) Craig Wilson	RW	222	22	55	72
(Scotland) Kyle Horne	D	215	18	42	60
(Scotland) Mark Garside	C	208	26	62	88
(Slovakia) Richard Hartmann	LW	204	74	135	209

Note: GP = Games Played, G = Goals, A = Assists, Pts = Points
Last updated: September 2016.

=== Club scoring leaders ===
Player	POS	GP	G	A	Pts
(Slovakia) Martin Cingel	RW	482	177	258	435
(Slovakia) Richard Hartmann	LW	204	74	135	209
(Slovakia) René Jarolín	C	169	104	98	202
(Scotland) Steven Lynch	LW	255	73	117	190
(Lithuania) Dainius Bauba	C	149	56	91	147
(Scotland) Tony Hand	C	79	35	100	135
(Scotland) Neil Hay	RW	499	44	91	135
(Canada) Jeff Hutchins	LW	113	48	80	128
(Canada) Adrian Saul	RW	71	57	56	113
(Canada) Steven Kaye	LW	68	51	58	109

Note: GP = Games Played, G = Goals, A = Assists, Pts = Points
Last updated: September.

== Honours and awards ==
=== Retired jerseys ===
- Number 12 worn by Jock Hay. Will be retired on 11 October 2025.
- Number 21 worn by Chris Kelland. On 15 December 2007, Kelland became the first player to have his jersey retired at Murrayfield after playing for the Racers for 10 seasons, totaling 676 points in 310 games.
- Number 29 worn by Martin Cingel. Was retired on 26 October 2024. Cingel played in 12 seasons for the Capitals on-and-off between 2002 and 2017.
- Number 9 worn by Tony Hand. On 29 November 2015, Hand, became the second player to have his jersey retired at Murrayfield after playing for the Racers and Edinburgh Capitals. Hand played 14 seasons with the Murrayfield Racers and 2 with the Edinburgh Capitals. However, since the Capitals reformed in 2022, the #9 has been used.

=== Hall of Fame members ===
- Former Murrayfield Racers captain, Chris Kelland, was inducted into the British Ice Hockey Hall of Fame in 2002.
- Former Murrayfield Racer, and owner of the Edinburgh Capitals, Scott Neil, was inducted into British Ice Hockey Hall of Fame in 2007.

=== Season awards ===
2000–01

- FBNL all-star 2nd team – Steven Lynch

2001–02

- FBNL all-star 2nd team – Jason Lafreniere

2002–03

- FBNL all-star team – Jan Krajicek

2003–04

- FBNL Player of The Year – Tony Hand
- FBNL all-star team – Tony Hand & Adrian Saul
- FBNL all-star 2nd team – Ladislav Kudrna, Jan Krajicek & Steven Kaye

2004–05

- FBNL all-star team – Dainius Bauba

2005–06

- EIHL Second Team All-Star – Tony Hand
- Best British Forward – Tony Hand
- Ice Hockey Annual Trophy – Tony Hand

2006–07

- British Netminder of the Year – Stephen Murphy

2007–08

- Vic Batchelder Memorial Award – Mark Garside

2008–09

- EIHL All-Star Team – Mark Hurtubise
- EIHL Top Pointscorer - Mark Hurtubise

2009–10

- EIHL Second All-Star Team – Owen Fussey
- EIHL newcomer of the year – Owen Fussey
- Coach of the Year – Doug Christiansen

2011–12

- EIHL top goalscorer – René Jarolin
- EIHL Second All Star Team – René Jarolin

2012–13

- Coach of the Year – Richard Hartmann
- EIHL Second All-Star Team – René Jarolin
