= Ladislav Kudrna =

Czech ice hockey goaltender

- Born: 10 January 1977 (age 49)
- Height: 6 ft 1 in (185 cm)
- Weight: 209 lb (95 kg; 14 st 13 lb)
- Position: Goaltender
- Caught: Left
- Played for: HC Slavia Praha; HC Dukla Jihlava; Hc Znojemští Orli; Nottingham Panthers; London Racers; Drakkars de Caen; Newcastle Vipers; Hull Stingrays; SCM Brașov; Dundee Stars
- Playing career: 1994–2011; 2013–2014

Ladislav Kudrna (born 10 January 1977) is a Czech former professional ice hockey goaltender.

Kudrna played in the Czech Extraliga for HC Slavia Praha, HC Dukla Jihlava and Hc Znojemští Orli. He also played in the Elite Ice Hockey League for the Nottingham Panthers, London Racers, Newcastle Vipers, Hull Stingrays and the Dundee Stars, and in the British National League for the Edinburgh Capitals and Hull Stingrays prior to the existence of the EIHL.
