= Nyqvist =

Nyqvist is a surname. Notable people with the surname include:

- Julius Nyqvist (born 1992), Finnish ice hockey player
- Michael Nyqvist (1960–2017), Swedish actor
- Per Nyqvist (born 1964), Swedish modern pentathlete
- Vaadjuv Nyqvist (1902–1961), Norwegian sailor
- Veikko Nyqvist (1916–1968), Finnish discus thrower

== See also ==
- Nyquist
