= Sergei Fokin =

Sergei Fokin may refer to:

- Sergei Fokin (footballer), Soviet footballer
- Sergei Fokin (ice hockey), Soviet ice hockey player
