= Duras =

Duras may refer to:

== Places ==
- Albanian city of Durrës (obsolete French spelling)
- Duras, Lot-et-Garonne, a commune of the Lot-et-Garonne département in France
- Duras, Belgium, a constituent village of the commune of Sint-Truiden in the Belgian province of Limburg

== People ==
- County of Duras, a noble family in the 11th and 12th centuries whose seat was Duras, Belgium
- Duras (Dacian king) (ruled c.69-87), king of Dacia who attacked the Roman empire
- Marguerite Duras (1914–1996), pseudonym of Marguerite Donnadieu, a French writer and film director
- Claire de Duras (1777–1828), a French writer
- Oldřich Duras or Důras (1882–1957), Czech chess International Grandmaster
- Důras, Czech surname

== Other ==
- Duras (grape), a red wine grape from Tarn in France
- House of Duras, in Star Trek, a house in the Klingon Empire
