= Nyquist =

Nyquist may refer to:

- Nyquist (surname)
- Nyquist (horse), winner of the 2016 Kentucky Derby
- Nyquist (programming language), computer programming language for sound synthesis and music composition

== See also ==
- Johnson–Nyquist noise, thermal noise
- Nyquist stability criterion, in control theory
  - Nyquist plot, signal processing and electronic feedback
- Nyquist–Shannon sampling theorem, fundamental result in the field of information theory
  - Nyquist frequency, digital signal processing
  - Nyquist rate, telecommunication theory
  - Nyquist ISI criterion, telecommunication theory
- 6625 Nyquist, a main-belt asteroid
- Nyquist filter, a filter used in television systems
- Enquist
- Nyqvist (disambiguation)
