= Nykvist =

Nykvist is a Swedish surname. Notable people with the surname include:

- Ann-Christin Nykvist (born 1948), Swedish politician
- Emelie Nykvist (born 1990), Swedish handball player
- Emil Nykvist (born 1997), Swedish biathlete
- Jens Nykvist (born 1968), Swedish Navy officer
- Malin Nykvist (born 1979), Swedish footballer
- Sven Nykvist (1922–2006), Swedish cinematographer

== See also ==
- Nyquist (disambiguation)
