= René Jarolín =

Slovak ice hockey player

- Born: 16 September 1981 (age 44) Skalica, Czechoslovakia
- Height: 6 ft 2 in (188 cm)
- Weight: 198 lb (90 kg; 14 st 2 lb)
- Position: Forward
- French Div 1 team Former teams: Étoile Noire de Strasbourg; HK 36 Skalica; HKm Zvolen; HC Slovan Bratislava; HK Poprad; Edinburgh Capitals; MsHK Žilina
- Playing career: 2001–present

René Jarolín (born 16 September 1981) is a Slovak professional ice hockey forward currently playing for Étoile Noire de Strasbourg in the FFHG Division 1.

Jarolín has previously played in the Slovak Extraliga for HK 36 Skalica, HKm Zvolen, HC Slovan Bratislava, HK Poprad and MsHK Žilina. He also played in the United Kingdom's Elite Ice Hockey League for the Edinburgh Capitals.
