= Alexander Islamov =

Russian ice hockey player (born 1986)

- Born: October 11, 1986 (age 39) Orsk, Russia
- Height: 6 ft 3 in (191 cm)
- Weight: 212 lb (96 kg; 15 st 2 lb)
- Position: Centre
- Shot: Left
- Played for: HC Neftekhimik Nizhnekamsk; Metallurg Novokuznetsk; Edinburgh Capitals
- Playing career: 2003–2017

Alexander Islamov (born October 11, 1986) is a former Russian professional ice hockey centre.

Islamov played in the Russian Superleague and the Kontinental Hockey League for HC Neftekhimik Nizhnekamsk and Metallurg Novokuznetsk between 2007 and 2013. He signed for the Edinburgh Capitals in the United Kingdom's Elite Ice Hockey League on July 31, 2017. He was however released from the team just four months later after playing eleven games.

== Career statistics ==
			Regular season					Playoffs
Season	Team	League	GP	G	A	Pts	PIM	GP	G	A	Pts	PIM
2003–04	Yuzhny Ural Orsk-2	Russia4	22	7	11	18	22	—	—	—	—	—
2004–05	Yuzhny Ural Orsk	Russia2	3	0	0	0	2	—	—	—	—	—
2004–05	Yuzhny Ural Orsk-2	Russia3	50	15	8	23	56	—	—	—	—	—
2005–06	Yuzhny Ural Orsk	Russia2	34	1	1	2	20	—	—	—	—	—
2005–06	Yuzhny Ural Orsk-2	Russia3	26	12	11	23	42	—	—	—	—	—
2006–07	Neftyanik Leninogorsk	Russia2	37	14	12	26	48	—	—	—	—	—
2006–07	HC Neftekhimik Nizhnekamsk-2	Russia3	7	4	3	7	8	—	—	—	—	—
2007–08	HC Neftekhimik Nizhnekamsk	Russia	24	3	3	6	30	5	0	0	0	2
2007–08	HC Neftekhimik Nizhnekamsk-2	Russia3	28	11	14	25	54	—	—	—	—	—
2008–09	HC Neftekhimik Nizhnekamsk	KHL	36	3	4	7	32	1	0	0	0	4
2009–10	HC Neftekhimik Nizhnekamsk	KHL	8	1	5	6	0	—	—	—	—	—
2010–11	HC Neftekhimik Nizhnekamsk	KHL	36	6	6	12	18	7	0	0	0	4
2011–12	HC Neftekhimik Nizhnekamsk	KHL	36	4	3	7	8	—	—	—	—	—
2012–13	Metallurg Novokuznetsk	KHL	41	3	2	5	12	—	—	—	—	—
2013–14	Yuzhny Ural Orsk	VHL	23	4	3	7	8	—	—	—	—	—
2013–14	Ariada Volzhsk	VHL	18	3	6	9	16	6	0	2	2	2
2014–15	Ariada Volzhsk	VHL	50	8	17	25	38	—	—	—	—	—
2015–16	Ariada Volzhsk	VHL	19	5	7	12	9	—	—	—	—	—
2015–16	Torpedo UST-Kamenogorsk	VHL	17	0	3	3	10	6	0	0	0	6
2016–17	Yermak Angarsk	VHL	23	2	2	4	12	6	1	1	2	2
2017–18	Edinburgh Capitals	EIHL	11	1	1	2	8	—	—	—	—	—
KHL totals			157	17	20	37	70	8	0	0	0	8
VHL totals			150	22	38	60	99	18	1	3	4	10
