= Étoile Noire de Strasbourg =

- Nickname: L'Étoile Noire (The Black Star)
- City: Strasbourg (France)
- League: Division 1; 2019-Present
- Founded: 2000
- Home arena: Patinoire Iceberg (capacity: 1250)
- Colours: Black, yellow and white
- President: Jean-Paul Hohnadel
- General manager: (France) Stéphane Hohnadel
- Head coach: (Canada) Daniel Bourdages
- Captain: (Czech Republic) Michal Důras
- Website: L'Étoile Noire

The Association Étoile Noire de Strasbourg is a French ice hockey team based in Strasbourg and playing in Division 1.

== History ==
former logo

The team currently uses the name of "Étoile Noire de Strasbourg" (Strasbourg Black Star) and was founded in 2000; they play home games at the Patinoire Iceberg.

The team reached Ligue Magnus after they became Division 1 champions in 2006. They appeared in the Magnus Cup playoff final in 2011.
They were relegated back to Division 1 after finishing in twelfth and last place of the Ligue Magnus standings in 2019.

== Roster ==
Updated February 13, 2019.

Goaltenders
Number		Player	Catches	Acquired	Place of Birth
53	(Slovakia)	Tomáš Hiadlovský	L	2018	Trenčín, Slovakia
83	(Slovakia)	Dušan Sidor	L	2019	Poprad, Slovakia
1	(France)	Adrien Vazzaz	L	2017	Briançon, France

Defencemen
Number		Player	Shoots	Acquired	Place of Birth
52	(France)	Aurélien Chausserie-Laprée	L	2014	Bordeaux, France
85	(France)	Maxime Deplanque	L	2013	Mulhouse, France
89	(Slovakia)	Radek Deyl (A)	L	2018	Košice, Slovakia
17	(Slovenia)	Miha Logar	R	2018	Kranj, Slovenia
82	(France)	Colin Morillon	R	2012	Marseille, France
42	(Canada)	Scott Prier	L	2018	Windsor, Canada
34	(Czech Republic)	Vojtěch Zadražil	R	2018	Pelhřimov, Czech Republic

Forwards
Number		Player	Shoots	Position	Acquired	Place of Birth
45	(France)	Julien Burgert (A)	R	RW	2008	Colmar, France
14	(France)	Loïc Chabert	L	LW/C	2018	Dijon, France
27	(France)	Romain Chapuis	L	LW/RW	2017	Grenoble, France
18	(Canada)	Dylan Denomme	L	LW	2018	Riverdale, Canada
96	(Czech Republic)	Michal Důras (C)	L	LW/RW	2017	Jihlava, Czech Republic
9	(France)	David Fritz-Dreyssé	L	LW	2018	Ourgou, Burkina Faso
66	(Slovakia)	Dominik Fujerik	L	C	2018	Ilava, Slovakia
13	(France)	Anthony Goncalves	L	LW	2017	Chamonix-Mont-Blanc, France
21	(Czech Republic)	Ondřej Havlíček	L	C	2018	Varnsdorf, Czech Republic
7	(Canada)	Danny Potvin	L	LW	2018	Saint-Cyprien-de-Napierville, Canada
20	(France)	Samuel Rousseau	L	C/LW	2014	Strasbourg, France
12	(France)	Hugo Sarlin	L	C/LW	2018	Grenoble, France
92	(Canada)	Mitch Zion	L	C	2018	Ottawa, Canada

== Former players ==
(Canada)

- Jacob Goldberg
- David Cayer
- Mickey Gilchrist
- Tomy Joly
- Maxime Mallette
- Steve Pelletier
- Wes Jarvis

(Czech Republic)

- Jakub Suchánek

(Finland)

- Heikki Laine

(France)

- Romain Bonnefond

(Slovakia)

- Pavol Resetka
- Miroslav Stolc
