= Paul Zanette =

Canadian-Italian ice hockey player

- Born: April 8, 1988 (age 38) Nobleton, Ontario, Canada
- Height: 6 ft 1 in (185 cm)
- Weight: 190 lb (86 kg; 13 st 8 lb)
- Position: Forward
- Shot: Left
- Played for: Hamilton Bulldogs; Rockford IceHogs; HC Asiago; HC Bolzano; Edinburgh Capitals
- National team: Italy
- NHL draft: Undrafted
- Playing career: 2011–2020

Medal record

Ice hockey

Representing Canada East

World Junior A Challenge
Silver medal – second place	2006 Yorkton	

Paul Zanette (born April 8, 1988) is a professional ice hockey player with dual Canadian and Italian citizenship. In 2011, during his time with the Niagara University Purple Eagles, he earned Atlantic Hockey Player of the Year honors and was a finalist for the prestigious Hobey Baker Award.

== Playing career ==
After going undrafted in the 2011 NHL Draft, Zanette signed as a free agent with the Rockford IceHogs of the American Hockey League for the 2011–12 season. He began the season with Rockford before being reassigned to the ECHL's Toledo Walleye.

Lacking significant contract opportunities in North America, he chose to sign with HC Asiago of Italy's Serie A league.

Following two productive seasons with Asiago, Zanette departed as a free agent and, alongside his brother Marc, signed with Italian club HC Bolzano of the Austrian Hockey League on August 9, 2014. While Zanette secured a spot by earning a one-year contract after his trial, his brother did not make the team.

After his contract with Asiago ended, Zanette signed a two-year deal with the Edinburgh Capitals, a Scottish team in the Elite Ice Hockey League. However, after playing only 35 games, the agreement was ended by mutual consent. He subsequently returned to HC Asiago to finish out the remainder of the 2015–16 season in Italy.

On July 21, 2016, Zanette came back to North America by signing a one-year deal with the Greenville Swamp Rabbits of the ECHL. He tallied 20 points with the team before being traded to the Indy Fuel on January 12, 2017.

== Career statistics ==
=== Regular season and playoffs ===
			Regular season					Playoffs
Season	Team	League	GP	G	A	Pts	PIM	GP	G	A	Pts	PIM
2004–05	North York Rangers	OPJHL	48	16	13	29	44	—	—	—	—	—
2005–06	North York Rangers	OPJHL	48	30	21	51	64	—	—	—	—	—
2006–07	Aurora Tigers	OPJHL	33	23	29	52	58	—	—	—	—	—
2007–08	Niagara University	CHA	34	7	12	19	14	—	—	—	—	—
2008–09	Niagara University	CHA	23	6	4	10	14	—	—	—	—	—
2009–10	Niagara University	CHA	36	11	10	21	38	—	—	—	—	—
2010–11	Niagara University	AHA	35	29	26	55	45	—	—	—	—	—
2010–11	Hamilton Bulldogs	AHL	7	1	0	1	2	11	2	0	2	2
2011–12	Toledo Walleye	ECHL	26	5	9	14	4	—	—	—	—	—
2011–12	Rockford IceHogs	AHL	13	0	0	0	2	—	—	—	—	—
2012–13	HC Asiago	ITL	42	20	25	45	42	13	4	9	13	20
2013–14	HC Asiago	ITL	32	14	23	37	26	11	7	3	10	18
2014–15	HC Bolzano	EBEL	45	8	13	21	27	1	0	0	0	2
2015–16	Edinburgh Capitals	EIHL	35	19	20	39	48	—	—	—	—	—
2015–16	HC Asiago	ITL	6	2	1	3	0	10	1	3	4	6
2016–17	Greenville Swamp Rabbits	ECHL	33	9	11	20	16	—	—	—	—	—
2016–17	Indy Fuel	ECHL	19	3	6	9	0	—	—	—	—	—
AHL totals			20	1	0	1	4	11	2	0	2	2

=== International ===
Year	Team	Event	Result	GP	G	A	Pts	PIM
2016	Italy	OGQ	NQ	3	0	3	3	4
Senior totals				3	0	3	3	4

== Awards and honours ==
Award	Year
All-Atlantic Hockey First Team	2010–11
Atlantic Hockey Player of the Year	2010–11
AHCA East Second-Team All-American	2010–11
Hobey Baker Award Finalist	2010–11

Awards and achievements
Preceded by Cory Conacher	Atlantic Hockey Player of the Year; 2010–11	Succeeded by Tim Kirby
Preceded by Cory Conacher	Atlantic Hockey Regular Season Scoring Trophy; 2010–11	Succeeded by Brett Gensler
