= Důras =

Důras and Duras (feminine: Důrasová, Durasová) are Czech surnames. According to one theory, the name was derived from the female given name Dorothea. Another theory believes that the surname has its origin in the Russian words durnoy, duryj, meaning 'stupid', 'ugly'. Notable people with the surname include:

- Michal Důras (born 1981), Czech hockey player
- Oldřich Duras, born Důras (1882–1957), Czech chess master

== See also ==
- Marguerite Duras, pseudonym of Marguerite Donnadieu (1914–1996), French writer and playwright
