= Peter Holecko =

Slovak ice hockey player (born 1982)

Peter Holečko
- Born: 13 January 1982 (age 44) Spišská Nová Ves, Czechoslovakia
- Height: 6 ft 4 in (193 cm)
- Weight: 198 lb (90 kg; 14 st 2 lb)
- Position: Forward
- FRA-3 team Former teams: Morzine-Avoriaz; HC Kosice; HK Dubnica; MHC Martin; HK 32 Liptovsky Mikulas; HK SKP Poprad; HK Spisska Nova Ves; Edinburgh Capitals
- Playing career: 2001–present

Peter Holečko (born 13 January 1982) is a Slovak professional ice hockey forward.

Holečko played in the Slovak Extraliga for HC Košice, HK Dubnica, MHC Martin, MHk 32 Liptovský Mikuláš and HK Poprad as well as in the Elite Ice Hockey League for the Edinburgh Capitals.
