= Karel Hromas =

Czech ice hockey player

- Born: January 27, 1986 (age 40) Beroun, Czechoslovakia
- Height: 6 ft 2 in (188 cm)
- Weight: 203 lb (92 kg; 14 st 7 lb)
- Position: Left wing
- Shot: Left
- team Former teams: Free agent HC Sparta Praha; Piráti Chomutov; Edinburgh Capitals; Annecy; Montpellier
- NHL draft: 123rd overall, 2004; Chicago Blackhawks
- Playing career: 2003–2019

Karel Hromas (born January 27, 1986) is a Czech professional ice hockey left winger who is currently a free agent. He most recently played for Vipers de Montpellier of the FFHG Division 1, the second-tier hockey league in France.

== Career ==
Hromas was selected by the Chicago Blackhawks in the 4th round (123rd overall) of the 2004 NHL entry draft from HC Sparta Praha's youth setup after a productive 2003–04 season, scoring 10 goals and 10 assists in 21 games. He also made his debut for Sparta Praha's main roster during the 2003–04 season but failed to score any points in 13 games. Following his draft selection, Hromas moved to North America to play junior hockey for the Everett Silvertips of the Western Hockey League. He stayed for two seasons before returning to Sparta Praha in 2006. In 2011, Hromas joined fellow Czech Extraliga team Piráti Chomutov.

In 2014, Hromas left the Czech Republic and moved to the Ligue Magnus in France, signing for Pingouins de Morzine-Avoriaz. He then moved to the United Kingdom to play in the Elite Ice Hockey League with the Edinburgh Capitals in the summer of 2016.

== Career statistics ==
=== Regular season and playoffs ===
| | | | Regular season | | | | | Playoffs |
| Season | Team | League | GP | G | A | Pts | PIM | GP | G | A | Pts | PIM |
|---|---|---|---|---|---|---|---|---|---|---|---|---|
| 2000–01 | HC Sparta Praha | CZE U18 | 34 | 4 | 18 | 22 | 6 | — | — | — | — | — |
| 2001–02 | HC Sparta Praha | CZE U18 | 39 | 19 | 15 | 34 | 55 | 6 | 3 | 2 | 5 | 6 |
| 2002–03 | HC Sparta Praha | CZE U18 | 2 | 3 | 1 | 4 | 0 | — | — | — | — | — |
| 2002–03 | HC Sparta Praha | CZE U20 | 42 | 7 | 8 | 15 | 18 | 3 | 0 | 1 | 1 | 4 |
| 2003–04 | HC Sparta Praha | CZE U20 | 21 | 10 | 10 | 20 | 16 | — | — | — | — | — |
| 2003–04 | HC Sparta Praha | ELH | 13 | 0 | 0 | 0 | 0 | 2 | 0 | 0 | 0 | 0 |
| 2004–05 | Everett Silvertips | WHL | 65 | 18 | 11 | 29 | 22 | 11 | 2 | 2 | 4 | 4 |
| 2005–06 | Everett Silvertips | WHL | 52 | 11 | 11 | 22 | 14 | 14 | 2 | 0 | 2 | 10 |
| 2006–07 | HC Sparta Praha | ELH | 48 | 1 | 0 | 1 | 20 | 11 | 1 | 0 | 1 | 0 |
| 2007–08 | HC Sparta Praha | ELH | 52 | 0 | 1 | 1 | 42 | 4 | 0 | 0 | 0 | 0 |
| 2008–09 | HC Sparta Praha | ELH | 52 | 2 | 4 | 6 | 64 | 11 | 0 | 3 | 3 | 20 |
| 2009–10 | HC Sparta Praha | ELH | 48 | 2 | 12 | 14 | 75 | 7 | 0 | 1 | 1 | 10 |
| 2010–11 | HC Sparta Praha | ELH | 52 | 7 | 4 | 11 | 36 | — | — | — | — | — |
| 2011–12 | Piráti Chomutov | CZE.2 | 44 | 7 | 6 | 13 | 34 | 19 | 3 | 3 | 6 | 12 |
| 2012–13 | Piráti Chomutov | ELH | 51 | 6 | 4 | 10 | 38 | — | — | — | — | — |
| 2013–14 | Piráti Chomutov | ELH | 7 | 0 | 1 | 1 | 4 | — | — | — | — | — |
| 2013–14 | SK Kadaň | CZE.2 | 29 | 6 | 5 | 11 | 6 | — | — | — | — | — |
| 2014–15 | Pingouins de Morzine–Avoriaz | FRA | 22 | 6 | 8 | 14 | 16 | 3 | 2 | 0 | 2 | 2 |
| 2015–16 | Pingouins de Morzine–Avoriaz | FRA | 24 | 5 | 6 | 11 | 26 | — | — | — | — | — |
| 2016–17 | Edinburgh Capitals | EIHL | 50 | 13 | 17 | 30 | 14 | — | — | — | — | — |
| 2017–18 | Chevaliers du Lac d’Annecy | FRA.2 | 26 | 8 | 12 | 20 | 20 | — | — | — | — | — |
| 2018–19 | Vipers de Montpellier | FRA.2 | 26 | 6 | 6 | 12 | 55 | — | — | — | — | — |
| ELH totals | | | 323 | 18 | 26 | 44 | 279 | 35 | 1 | 4 | 5 | 30 |

=== International ===
| Year | Team | Event | GP | G | A | Pts | PIM |
|---|---|---|---|---|---|---|---|
| 2003 | Czech Republic | WJC18 | 6 | 0 | 0 | 0 | 6 |
| 2003 | Czech Republic | U18 | 5 |
| 2004 | Czech Republic | WJC | 7 | 1 | 0 | 1 | 2 |
| 2004 | Czech Republic | WJC18 | 7 | 1 | 1 | 2 | 2 |
| 2006 | Czech Republic | WJC | 6 | 1 | 3 | 4 | 8 |
| Junior totals | | | 26 | 3 | 4 | 7 | 18 |
