= Jaroslav Hertl =

Czech ice hockey player

- Born: October 28, 1989 (age 36) Prague, Czechoslovakia
- Height: 6 ft 3 in (191 cm)
- Weight: 218 lb (99 kg; 15 st 8 lb)
- Position: Defence
- Shot: Left
- Played for: HC Slavia Praha; HKM Zvolen; GKS Tychy; Edinburgh Capitals
- Playing career: 2008–2018

Jaroslav Hertl (born October 28, 1989) is a Czech former professional ice hockey defenceman.

Hertl played three games with HC Slavia Praha in the Czech Extraliga. He later played in the Slovak Extraliga for HKM Zvolen and MsHK Žilina and in the Polska Hokej Liga for GKS Tychy, before joining the Edinburgh Capitals of the Elite Ice Hockey League for the 2016–17 season. Ahead of the 2017–18 season, Hertl moved to France in June 2017 to sign for Yétis du Mont-Blanc.

His younger brother Tomáš Hertl is also an ice hockey player and currently plays for the Vegas Golden Knights.

== Career statistics ==
| | | | Regular season | | | | | Playoffs |
| Season | Team | League | GP | G | A | Pts | PIM | GP | G | A | Pts | PIM |
|---|---|---|---|---|---|---|---|---|---|---|---|---|
| 2003–04 | HC Slavia Praha U18 | Czech U18 | 1 | 0 | 0 | 0 | 0 | — | — | — | — | — |
| 2004–05 | HC Slavia Praha U18 | Czech U18 | 34 | 5 | 1 | 6 | 12 | 1 | 0 | 0 | 0 | 0 |
| 2005–06 | HC Slavia Praha U18 | Czech U18 | 37 | 5 | 9 | 14 | 42 | — | — | — | — | — |
| 2005–06 | HC Slavia Praha U20 | Czech U20 | 3 | 0 | 0 | 0 | 2 | — | — | — | — | — |
| 2006–07 | HC Slavia Praha U20 | Czech U20 | 39 | 6 | 4 | 10 | 24 | 5 | 0 | 1 | 1 | 4 |
| 2006–07 | HC Slavoj Velké Popovice U20 | Czech U20 2 | — | — | — | — | — | — | — | — | — | — |
| 2007–08 | Brampton Battalion | OHL | 52 | 0 | 5 | 5 | 36 | 5 | 0 | 1 | 1 | 0 |
| 2008–09 | HC Slavia Praha U20 | Czech U20 | 36 | 5 | 17 | 22 | 54 | 2 | 0 | 0 | 0 | 6 |
| 2008–09 | HC Slavia Praha | Czech | 1 | 0 | 0 | 0 | 2 | — | — | — | — | — |
| 2009–10 | HC Havlíčkův Brod | Czech2 | 7 | 0 | 0 | 0 | 0 | — | — | — | — | — |
| 2009–10 | HC Spartak Pelhřimov | Czech2 | 2 | 0 | 0 | 0 | 0 | — | — | — | — | — |
| 2010–11 | HC Slavia Praha | Czech | 1 | 0 | 0 | 0 | 0 | 1 | 0 | 0 | 0 | 0 |
| 2010–11 | HC Berounští Medvědi | Czech2 | 23 | 3 | 0 | 3 | 8 | 4 | 0 | 0 | 0 | 2 |
| 2011–12 | HC Berounští Medvědi | Czech2 | 20 | 0 | 0 | 0 | 8 | — | — | — | — | — |
| 2011–12 | HC Kobra Praha | Czech3 | 8 | 1 | 2 | 3 | 4 | — | — | — | — | — |
| 2012–13 | HC Berounští Medvědi | Czech2 | 25 | 0 | 2 | 2 | 20 | — | — | — | — | — |
| 2012–13 | HKM Zvolen | Slovak | 11 | 1 | 1 | 2 | 6 | 16 | 0 | 2 | 2 | 16 |
| 2013–14 | HKM Zvolen | Slovak | 33 | 3 | 3 | 6 | 24 | 3 | 0 | 1 | 1 | 8 |
| 2014–15 | MsHK Zilina | Slovak | 14 | 0 | 0 | 0 | 16 | — | — | — | — | — |
| 2014–15 | LHK Jestřábi Prostějov | Czech2 | 15 | 1 | 0 | 1 | 4 | — | — | — | — | — |
| 2014–15 | GKS Tychy | Poland | 5 | 0 | 1 | 1 | 4 | 14 | 0 | 2 | 2 | 4 |
| 2015–16 | GKS Tychy | Poland | 34 | 4 | 7 | 11 | 49 | 11 | 1 | 4 | 5 | 2 |
| 2016–17 | Edinburgh Capitals | EIHL | 42 | 2 | 15 | 17 | 45 | — | — | — | — | — |
| 2017–18 | Yétis du Mont-Blanc | France2 | 22 | 5 | 7 | 12 | 14 | — | — | — | — | — |
| Czech totals | | | 2 | 0 | 0 | 0 | 2 | 1 | 0 | 0 | 0 | 0 |
| Czech2 totals | | | 90 | 4 | 2 | 6 | 40 | 4 | 0 | 0 | 0 | 2 |
| Czech3 totals | | | 10 | 1 | 2 | 3 | 4 | — | — | — | — | — |
| Slovak totals | | | 58 | 4 | 4 | 8 | 46 | 19 | 0 | 3 | 3 | 24 |
