= Scott Neil =

Scottish ice hockey player

- Born: 1 August 1962 (age 64) Edinburgh, Scotland
- Height: 5 ft 9 in (175 cm)
- Weight: 187 lb (85 kg; 13 st 5 lb)
- Position: Forward
- Shot: Left
- Played for: Murrayfield Racers; Sheffield Steelers; Murrayfield Royals; Edinburgh Capitals
- National team: Great Britain
- Playing career: 1985–2002

Andrew Scott Neil, known as Scott Neil, (born 1 August 1962 in Edinburgh, Scotland) is a retired British ice hockey player who played in the United Kingdom between 1985 and 2002. He also played for the Great Britain national team between 1989 and 1994. He was inducted into the British Ice Hockey Hall of Fame in 2007.

Neil is currently the owner of the Edinburgh Capitals in the British Elite Ice Hockey League.

== Playing career ==
=== Club ===
After playing junior ice hockey in Edinburgh, Neil went to university in Canada. When he returned to the United Kingdom he rejoined the Edinburgh setup as a senior player with the Murrayfield Racers in 1985 playing in the Premier Division of the British Hockey League. In his seven seasons with the Racers, he helped the team to win the league championship in 1986–87 and 1987–88; the Norwich Union Trophy in 1985; and reaching the playoff finals weekend at Wembley Arena every year bar one and winning the playoffs in 1986. He was also twice named the British All Star team.

In 1992, Neil joined the Sheffield Steelers in Division 1 of the British Hockey League. In his five seasons with the Steelers, he helped them to gain promotion to the Premier Division as well as to win the grand slam of the Benson & Hedges Cup, the league championship and the playoff championship in 1994–95; as well as the playoff championship in 1996 and 1997 and the league championship in 1995–96.

Neil returned to Edinburgh in 1997 where he had helped form the Murrayfield Royals, who later changed their name to the Edinburgh Capitals. Neil retired from playing at the end of the 2001–02 season. He also coached the Capitals for the 2006–07 season after the previous coach, and his cousin, Tony Hand, left to coach the Manchester Phoenix. However, the following season, 2007–08, he hired Doug Christiansen to coach the Capitals.

=== International ===
Neil played for the Great Britain national team seven times between 1989 and 1994. During this time he helped the team gain promotion from Pool D to Pool A of the Ice Hockey World Championships and taking part in the Olympic Qualifiers in 1993. In total Neil scored 23 goals and 12 assists for 35 points in the games he played for his country.

== Awards and honours ==
- Named to the Premier League British All Star team in 1988 and 1989.
- Inducted to the British Ice Hockey Hall of Fame in 2007.

== Career statistics ==
=== Club ===
			Regular season					Playoffs				
Season	Team	League	GP	G	A	Pts	PIM	GP	G	A	Pts	PIM
1985–86	Murrayfield Racers	BHL Prem	28	29	20	49	43	6	3	5	8	6
1986–87	Murrayfield Racers	BHL Prem	36	42	52	94	19	6	4	1	5	6
1987–88	Murrayfield Racers	BHL Prem	36	71	57	128	6	5	8	3	11	2
1988–89	Murrayfield Racers	BHL Prem	36	82	41	123	14	4	2	2	4	2
1989–90	Murrayfield Racers	BHL Prem	32	66	37	103	20	6	6	4	10	2
1990–91	Murrayfield Racers	BHL Prem	36	60	41	101	18	7	7	6	13	0
1991–92	Murrayfield Racers	BHL Prem	35	30	42	72	8	6	3	6	9	2
1992–93	Sheffield Steelers	BHL 1	32	47	52	99	18					
1993–94	Sheffield Steelers	BHL Prem	57	48	54	102	26	8	3	6	9	12
1994–95	Sheffield Steelers	BHL Prem	44	21	31	52	18	8	3	4	7	8
1995–96	Sheffield Steelers	BHL Prem	34	4	11	15	12					
1996–97	Sheffield Steelers	ISL	32	2	1	3	0	8	0	2	2	0
1997–98	Murrayfield Royals	BNL	40	34	42	76	20					
1998–99	Edinburgh Capitals	BNL	26	4	8	12	4	3	0	0	0	0
1999–00	Edinburgh Capitals	BNL	7	1	0	1	14	3	0	0	0	0
2001–02	Edinburgh Capitals	BNL	2	0	0	0	0	--	--	--	--	--

=== International ===
			Tournament				
Year	Team	Event	GP	G	A	Pts	PIM
1989	Great Britain	World Championships Pool D	4	5	4	9	0
1990	Great Britain	World Championships Pool D	4	5	3	8	0
1991	Great Britain	World Championships Pool C	8	7	1	8	10
1992	Great Britain	World Championships Pool C	5	6	4	10	4
1993	Great Britain	World Championships Pool B	5	0	0	0	0
1993	Great Britain	Olympic Qualifiers	4	0	0	0	0
1994	Great Britain	World Championships Pool A					
