= Tomáš Hiadlovský =

Slovak ice hockey player

- Born: 15 December 1988 (age 36); Trenčín, Czechoslovakia
- Height: 5 ft 11 in (180 cm)
- Weight: 174 lb (79 kg; 12 st 6 lb)
- Position: Goaltender
- Catches: Left
- Ligue Magnus team Former teams: Étoile Noire de Strasbourg; HC Slovan Ústečtí Lvi; HK Dukla Trenčín; Edinburgh Capitals
- Playing career: 2006–present

Tomáš Hiadlovský (born 15 December 1988) is a Slovak professional ice hockey goaltender. He started his career with HK Dukla Trenčín before moving to the Edinburgh Capitals in the Elite Ice Hockey League for the 2012/13 season.
