= Bari McKenzie =

Scottish ice hockey player

- Born: 16 August 1986 (age 39); Dumfries, Scotland
- Height: 5 ft 11 in (180 cm)
- Weight: 185 lb (84 kg; 13 st 3 lb)
- Position: Forward
- Shoots: Right
- NIHL team Former teams: Bristol Pitbulls; Braehead Clan; Dundee Stars; Manchester Phoenix; Cardiff Devils; Milton Keynes Lightning; Milton Keynes Thunder; Basingstoke Bison; Coventry Blaze; Belfast Giants; Chelmsford Chieftains; Edinburgh Capitals; Fife Flyers; Solway Sharks
- Playing career: 2003–present

Bari McKenzie (born 16 August 1986) is a Scottish professional ice hockey forward currently playing for Bristol Pitbulls in the NIHL. McKenzie was most recently with the Solway Sharks.
