= Jakub Suchánek =

Czech ice hockey defenceman (born 1984)

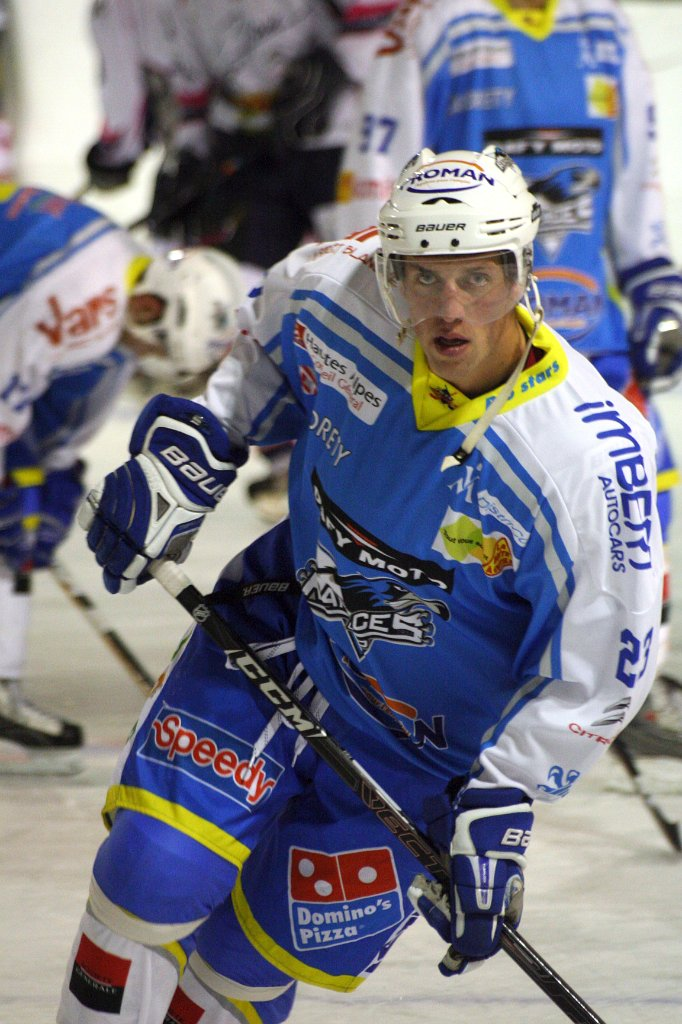
- Born: November 16, 1984 (age 40); Tábor, Czechoslovakia
- Height: 6 ft 4 in (193 cm)
- Weight: 231 lb (105 kg; 16 st 7 lb)
- Position: Defence
- Shoots: Left
- Czech.2 team Former teams: HC Tábor; Rapaces de Gap; Étoile Noire de Strasbourg; HC Dukla Jihlava; HC Litvínov; Motor České Budějovice; Rytíři Kladno
- Playing career: 2003–present

Jakub Suchánek (born November 16, 1984) is a Czech professional ice hockey defenceman playing for HC Tábor of the Czech 2. Liga (Czech.2).

== Playing career ==
Suchánek played the early part of his career in the Czech lower leagues as well as spells in the 1st Czech Republic Hockey League for HC Slovan Ústečtí Lvi, HC Olomouc, Sportovní Klub Kadaň and HC Most. He also played five seasons in France between 2009 and 2014, spending three seasons with Rapaces de Gap and two with Étoile Noire de Strasbourg.

Suchánek made his Czech Extraliga debut with HC Dukla Jihlava during the 2017–18 season at the age of 33. The team were relegated to the Chance Liga, though Suchánek did manage a return to the Extraliga on loan at HC Litvínov. On May 1, 2019, he joined Motor České Budějovice of the Chance Liga where they earned promotion to the Czech Extraliga.
