= Martin Lučka =

Czech ice hockey player

- Born: March 10, 1985 (age 41) Uherské Hradiště, Czechoslovakia
- Height: 6 ft 3 in (191 cm)
- Weight: 196 lb (89 kg; 14 st 0 lb)
- Position: Defence
- Shot: Left
- Played for: HC Zlín; HC Karlovy Vary; Piráti Chomutov; HC Vítkovice; Edinburgh Capitals; Frisk Asker; Podhale Nowy Targ
- National team: Czech Republic
- Playing career: 2004–2016

Martin Lučka (born March 10, 1985) is a Czech former professional ice hockey defenceman.

Lučka played a total of 333 games in the Czech Extraliga with HC Zlín, HC Karlovy Vary, Piráti Chomutov and HC Vítkovice. He also played in the Elite Ice Hockey League for the Edinburgh Capitals, the GET-ligaen for Frisk Asker and the Polska Hokej Liga for Podhale Nowy Targ.

== Career statistics ==
			Regular season					Playoffs
Season	Team	League	GP	G	A	Pts	PIM	GP	G	A	Pts	PIM
1999–00	HC Zlin U18	Czech U18	35	0	4	4	16	—	—	—	—	—
2000–01	HC Zlin U18	Czech U18	48	4	9	13	32	2	0	0	0	0
2000–01	HC Zlin U20	Czech U20	1	0	0	0	0	—	—	—	—	—
2001–02	HC Zlin U18	Czech U18	5	0	0	0	8	—	—	—	—	—
2001–02	HC Zlin U20	Czech U20	36	0	0	0	33	—	—	—	—	—
2002–03	HC Zlin U20	Czech U20	29	3	3	6	32	—	—	—	—	—
2003–04	Peterborough Petes	OHL	56	3	4	7	18	—	—	—	—	—
2004–05	HC Zlin U20	Czech U20	43	0	11	11	44	2	0	0	0	0
2004–05	SHK Hodonín	Czech3	16	1	0	1	12	3	0	0	0	0
2005–06	SK Horácká Slavia Třebíč U20	Czech U20 2	1	1	0	1	2	—	—	—	—	—
2005–06	SK Horácká Slavia Třebíč	Czech2	52	3	4	7	36	—	—	—	—	—
2006–07	HC Hame Zlin	Czech	43	0	1	1	28	5	1	0	1	0
2006–07	SK Horácká Slavia Třebíč	Czech2	4	0	0	0	4	5	0	2	2	10
2007–08	HC Zlin	Czech	43	1	1	2	24	—	—	—	—	—
2008–09	HC Zlin	Czech	52	1	2	3	46	5	0	1	1	2
2009–10	HC Zlin	Czech	46	2	2	4	42	6	0	1	1	0
2010–11	HC Zlin	Czech	39	0	1	1	22	4	0	0	0	2
2011–12	HC Zlin	Czech	25	0	1	1	12	—	—	—	—	—
2011–12	HC Energie Karlovy Vary	Czech	18	1	2	3	8	—	—	—	—	—
2012–13	Piráti Chomutov	Czech	21	1	0	1	14	—	—	—	—	—
2012–13	HC Vítkovice	Czech	5	0	0	0	2	—	—	—	—	—
2012–13	SK Kadaň	Czech2	18	0	4	4	8	—	—	—	—	—
2013–14	Edinburgh Capitals	EIHL	9	0	1	1	12	—	—	—	—	—
2013–14	Frisk Asker Ishockey	Norway	15	1	2	3	10	4	0	0	0	6
2014–15	Podhale Nowy Targ	Poland	43	2	15	17	20	9	0	0	0	6
2015–16	Scorpions de Mulhouse	France2	24	1	6	7	46	3	0	0	0	2
Czech totals			292	6	10	16	198	20	1	2	3	4
