= Yevgeny Fyodorov (ice hockey) =

Russian ice hockey player (born 1980)

- Born: November 11, 1980 (age 45) Sverdlovsk, Russian SFSR, Soviet Union
- Height: 5 ft 10 in (178 cm)
- Weight: 190 lb (86 kg; 13 st 8 lb)
- Position: Centre
- Shot: Left
- Played for: Spartak Moscow; HC MVD; Metallurg Magnitogorsk; Dynamo Moscow; Ak Bars Kazan; Molot-Prikamye Perm; Krylya Sovetov; Yugra Khanty-Mansiysk; Sputnik Nizhny Tagil; Torpedo Ust-Kamenogorsk; Edinburgh Capitals
- NHL draft: 201st overall, 2000; Los Angeles Kings
- Playing career: 1997–2017

Yevgeny Yurievich Fyodorov (born November 11, 1980) is a Russian former professional ice hockey centre who last played for Edinburgh Capitals of the Elite Ice Hockey League (EIHL).

Fedorov was drafted in the seventh round, 201st overall by the Los Angeles Kings in the 2000 NHL entry draft.

== Career statistics ==
=== Regular season and playoffs ===
			Regular season					Playoffs
Season	Team	League	GP	G	A	Pts	PIM	GP	G	A	Pts	PIM
1996–97	SKA Sverdlovsk	RUS.3	10	2	1	3	0	—	—	—	—	—
1996–97	Krylia Sovetov–2 Moscow	RUS.3	10	0	1	1	4	—	—	—	—	—
1997–98	Krylia Sovetov Moscow	RSL	32	1	0	1	12	—	—	—	—	—
1997–98	Krylia Sovetov–2 Moscow	RUS.3	20	1	6	7	48	—	—	—	—	—
1998–99	Krylia Sovetov Moscow	RSL	32	1	2	3	24	—	—	—	—	—
1999–2000	Molot–Prikamye Perm	RSL	37	5	5	10	20	3	0	1	1	4
2000–01	Molot–Prikamye Perm	RSL	41	7	11	18	20	—	—	—	—	—
2001–02	Ak Bars Kazan	RSL	45	10	12	22	10	11	0	0	0	2
2002–03	Ak Bars Kazan	RSL	46	4	11	15	26	5	1	0	1	2
2003–04	Ak Bars Kazan	RSL	47	7	4	11	14	4	0	0	0	0
2003–04	Ak Bars–2 Kazan	RUS.3	1	0	0	0	0	—	—	—	—	—
2004–05	Ak Bars Kazan	RSL	46	4	10	14	10	—	—	—	—	—
2004–05	Ak Bars–2 Kazan	RUS.3	1	1	0	1	0	—	—	—	—	—
2005–06	Dynamo Moscow	RSL	35	7	9	16	16	—	—	—	—	—
2006–07	Dynamo Moscow	RSL	48	15	9	24	42	3	0	0	0	0
2007–08	Metallurg Magnitogorsk	RSL	49	9	10	19	64	13	1	1	2	2
2008–09	Metallurg Magnitogorsk	KHL	54	0	4	4	14	11	1	1	2	8
2009–10	HC MVD	KHL	53	5	12	17	24	22	4	2	6	2
2010–11	Spartak Moscow	KHL	53	13	12	25	28	4	0	0	0	2
2011–12	HC Yugra	KHL	49	6	10	16	14	4	0	0	0	4
2012–13	HC Yugra	KHL	18	1	2	3	8	—	—	—	—	—
2012–13	Sibir Novosibirsk	KHL	18	2	1	3	8	7	0	1	1	2
2013–14	Avtomobilist Yekaterinburg	KHL	40	2	7	9	12	3	0	0	0	0
2014–15	Sputnik Nizhny Tagil	VHL	42	8	15	23	14	6	0	0	0	6
2015–16	Sputnik Nizhny Tagil	VHL	29	5	10	15	16	—	—	—	—	—
2015–16	Torpedo Ust–Kamenogorsk	VHL	15	1	4	5	8	6	1	1	2	4
2016–17	Edinburgh Capitals	EIHL	49	11	14	25	14	—	—	—	—	—
RSL totals			458	70	83	153	258	39	2	2	4	10
KHL totals			285	29	48	77	108	51	5	4	9	18

=== International ===
Year	Team	Event	GP	G	A	Pts	PIM
2000	Russia	WJC	7	1	4	5	4
Junior totals			7	1	4	5	4
