= Michal Dobroň =

Czech ice hockey player

- Born: September 29, 1979 (age 46) Prague, Czechoslovakia
- Height: 6 ft 2 in (188 cm)
- Weight: 236 lb (107 kg; 16 st 12 lb)
- Position: Defence
- Shot: Right
- Played for: HC Sparta Praha; HC Karlovy Vary; HC Plzeň; HC Slovan Bratislava; Edinburgh Capitals; Pingouins de Morzine-Avoriaz; Brest Albatros Hockey; HC Podebrady
- Playing career: 1998–2020

Michal Dobroň (born September 29, 1979) is a Czech professional ice hockey defenceman who is currently a free agent.

Dobroň previously played in the Czech Extraliga for HC Sparta Praha, HC Karlovy Vary and HC Plzeň as well as the Tipsport Liga in Slovakia for HC Slovan Bratislava before joining the Edinburgh Capitals of the United Kingdom's Elite Ice Hockey League in 2012. He stayed for two seasons before joining Pingouins de Morzine-Avoriaz of the French Ligue Magnus.

Having not playing during the 2015–16 season, Dobroň returned to the Edinburgh Capitals as player-coach in May 2016 ahead of the 2016-17 season. He departed in May 2017, taking up the position of player-assistant coach with Brest.

== Career statistics ==
			Regular season					Playoffs
Season	Team	League	GP	G	A	Pts	PIM	GP	G	A	Pts	PIM
1995–96	HC Sparta Praha U18	Czech U18	34	4	6	10	—	—	—	—	—	—
1996–97	HC Sparta Praha U20	Czech U20	27	1	1	2	—	—	—	—	—	—
1997–98	HC Sparta Praha U20	Czech U20	36	8	9	17	—	2	0	0	0	—
1998–99	HC Sparta Praha U20	Czech U20	40	8	12	20	—	—	—	—	—	—
1998–99	HC Sparta Praha	Czech	12	0	0	0	0	1	0	0	0	0
1999–00	HC Sparta Praha U20	Czech U20	2	1	1	2	14	—	—	—	—	—
1999–00	HC Karlovy Vary U20	Czech U20	4	1	2	3	14	2	0	0	0	4
1999–00	HC Karlovy Vary	Czech	41	5	4	9	20	—	—	—	—	—
1999–00	HC Sparta Praha	Czech	7	0	0	0	6	—	—	—	—	—
1999–00	HC Slovan Ústí nad Labem	Czech3	3	1	1	2	0	3	1	1	2	0
2000–01	HC Sparta Praha	Czech	30	0	2	2	12	8	0	1	1	6
2001–02	HC Karlovy Vary	Czech	50	6	5	11	71	—	—	—	—	—
2002–03	HC Plzeň	Czech	48	8	11	19	24	—	—	—	—	—
2003–04	HC Plzeň	Czech	44	3	6	9	28	10	1	2	3	14
2004–05	HC Sparta Praha	Czech	50	2	3	5	30	5	0	0	0	0
2005–06	HC Sparta Praha	Czech	34	0	4	4	18	—	—	—	—	—
2005–06	HC Energie Karlovy Vary	Czech	17	4	6	10	59	—	—	—	—	—
2006–07	HC Energie Karlovy Vary	Czech	52	9	7	16	60	3	0	1	1	2
2007–08	HC Energie Karlovy Vary	Czech	52	3	10	13	64	19	2	3	5	22
2008–09	HC Energie Karlovy Vary	Czech	52	5	11	16	63	1	0	0	0	0
2009–10	HC Energie Karlovy Vary	Czech	48	1	10	11	55	—	—	—	—	—
2010–11	HC Energie Karlovy Vary	Czech	52	3	8	11	24	5	0	1	1	6
2011–12	HC Slovan Bratislava	Slovak	52	2	14	16	36	16	1	3	4	10
2012–13	Edinburgh Capitals	EIHL	52	5	24	29	49	2	1	0	1	0
2013–14	Edinburgh Capitals	EIHL	41	6	16	22	28	—	—	—	—	—
2014–15	Pingouins de Morzine-Avoriaz	Ligue Magnus	25	8	7	15	16	3	1	0	1	6
2016–17	Edinburgh Capitals	EIHL	49	7	16	23	76	—	—	—	—	—
2017–18	Brest Albatros Hockey	France2	26	2	8	10	32	14	0	4	4	10
2018–19	HC Poděbrady	Czech4	—	—	—	—	—	—	—	—	—	—
2019–20	HC Poděbrady	Czech4	12	1	4	5	4	3	0	1	1	0
Czech totals			589	49	87	136	534	52	3	8	11	50
EIHL totals			142	18	56	74	153	2	1	0	1	0
