= Richard Hartmann (ice hockey) =

Slovak ice hockey player

- Born: November 7, 1975 (age 49); Bratislava, Czechoslovakia
- Height: 5 ft 11 in (180 cm)
- Weight: 192 lb (87 kg; 13 st 10 lb)
- Position: Forward
- Shot: Left
- Played for: HK 36 Skalica; Idaho Steelheads; HK Nitra; KS Cracovia; Lausitzer Füchse; Edinburgh Capitals; Braehead Clan
- Playing career: 1999–2016

Richard Hartmann (born November 7, 1975) is a Slovak former professional ice hockey forward who last played for the Braehead Clan in the Elite Ice Hockey League as player/assistant coach. He was previously the player-coach with the Edinburgh Capitals from 2011-2015 and is currently the head coach of the Dundee Comets.

Hartmann spent most of his playing career with HK 36 Skalica.

== Career statistics ==
			Regular season					Playoffs
Season	Team	League	GP	G	A	Pts	PIM	GP	G	A	Pts	PIM
1994–95	Nipawin Hawks	SJHL	63	18	53	71	114	—	—	—	—	—
1995–96	Nipawin Hawks	SJHL	64	26	56	82	141	—	—	—	—	—
1996–97	HK 36 Skalica	Slovak	14	1	2	3	6	—	—	—	—	—
1996–97	HK 36 Skalica	Slovak2	34	5	10	15	49	—	—	—	—	—
1997–98	HK 36 Skalica	Slovak	36	5	7	12	41	—	—	—	—	—
1998–99	HK 36 Skalica	Slovak	22	1	2	3	12	4	1	1	2	—
1999–00	HK 36 Skalica	Slovak	44	12	15	27	39	—	—	—	—	—
2000–01	Idaho Steelheads	WCHL	2	0	0	0	0	—	—	—	—	—
2000–01	HK 36 Skalica	Slovak	32	5	7	12	47	5	1	2	3	4
2001–02	HK 36 Skalica	Slovak	53	13	18	31	66	—	—	—	—	—
2002–03	HK 36 Skalica	Slovak	54	22	26	48	44	7	1	1	2	0
2003–04	HK 36 Skalica	Slovak	54	16	35	51	46	5	0	3	3	6
2004–05	HK 36 Skalica	Slovak	43	11	14	25	32	—	—	—	—	—
2004–05	HK Nitra	Slovak	11	0	1	1	2	5	2	1	3	0
2005–06	HK 36 Skalica	Slovak	54	12	29	41	72	7	0	4	4	31
2006–07	Cracovia Krakow	Poland	50	23	24	47	48	—	—	—	—	—
2007–08	HK 36 Skalica	Slovak	50	16	36	52	28	13	6	5	11	12
2008–09	HK 36 Skalica	Slovak	44	25	37	62	55	17	4	12	16	16
2009–10	HK 36 Skalica	Slovak	44	12	25	37	22	7	2	1	3	4
2010–11	Lausitzer Füchse	Germany2	44	14	18	32	14	—	—	—	—	—
2011–12	Edinburgh Capitals	EIHL	52	17	42	59	28	—	—	—	—	—
2012–13	Edinburgh Capitals	EIHL	48	22	34	56	34	2	0	1	1	0
2013–14	Edinburgh Capitals	EIHL	48	19	32	51	64	—	—	—	—	—
2014–15	Edinburgh Capitals	EIHL	34	12	15	27	20	—	—	—	—	—
2015–16	Braehead Clan	EIHL	4	0	3	3	0	—	—	—	—	—
2018–19	Murrayfield Racers	SNL	3	1	2	3	2	—	—	—	—	—
Slovak totals			555	151	254	405	512	70	17	30	47	73
