= Ourgou-Manéga (department) =

- Department
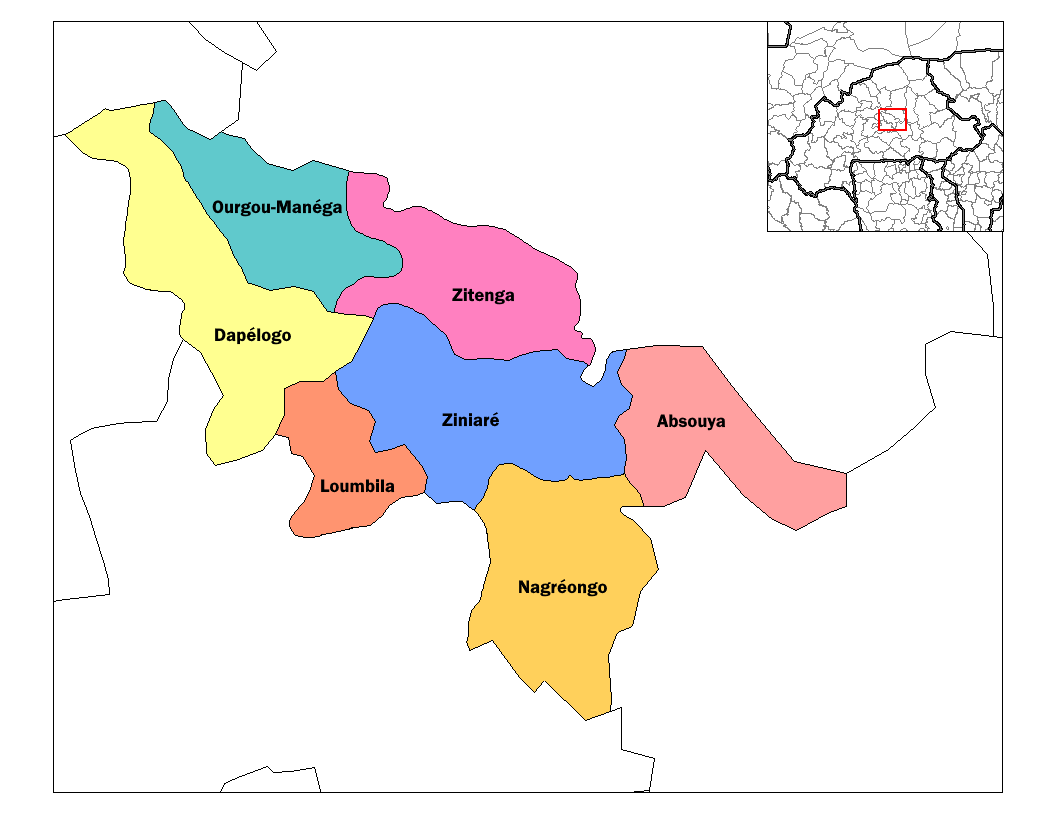
- Ourgou-Manéga Department location in the province
- Country: Burkina Faso
- Region: Plateau-Central Region
- Province: Oubritenga Province

Population (2019)
  - Total: 24,030
- Time zone: UTC+0 (GMT 0)

Ourgou-Manéga is a department or commune of Oubritenga Province in Burkina Faso.
