= Paul Deniset =

Canadian ice hockey player

- Born: July 13, 1981 (age 45) Winnipeg, Manitoba, Canada
- Height: 5 ft 10 in (178 cm)
- Weight: 170 lb (77 kg; 12 st 2 lb)
- Position: Centre
- Shot: Left
- Played for: Fischtown Pinguins; SC Bietigheim-Bissingen; Schwenninger Wild Wings; Belfast Giants; AaB Ishockey; Gothiques d'Amiens
- Playing career: 2006–2012

Paul Deniset (born July 13, 1981) is a Canadian former professional ice hockey player.

Born in Winnipeg, Manitoba, Deniset played junior hockey in the Western Hockey League, beginning with the Kamloops Blazers. He was then traded to the Swift Current Broncos and then spent a full season with the Prince Albert Raiders before briefly playing in the Central Hockey League with the Oklahoma City Blazers for their playoff run during the 2001-02 season. Deniset then returned to the WHL with the Vancouver Giants in 2002.

Deniset then chose to go to college, spending four seasons in the University of Manitoba. After earning his degree, he turned pro in 2006, signing for REV Bremerhaven of the German 2nd Bundesliga. He then had spells in the same league with SC Bietigheim-Bissingen and the Schwenninger Wild Wings. In 2008, Deniset signed with the Belfast Giants in the United Kingdom's Elite Ice Hockey League. He then moved to Denmark and signed for AaB Ishockey in 2009 and in 2010 he signed for French side Gothiques d'Amiens before returning to the Belfast Giants in January 2012.
