= Julius Nyqvist =

Finnish ice hockey player

- Born: October 29, 1992 (age 32); Vantaa, Finland
- Height: 5 ft 11 in (180 cm)
- Weight: 183 lb (83 kg; 13 st 1 lb)
- Position: Defence
- Shoots: Right
- AlpsHL team Former teams: EHC Bregenzerwald; HIFK; Kiekko-Vantaa; KooKoo; Peliitat; Edinburgh Capitals; Gentofte Stars; Rødovre Mighty Bulls
- NHL draft: Undrafted
- Playing career: 2011–present

Julius Nyqvist (born October 29, 1992) is a Finnish ice hockey defenceman. He is currently playing for EHC Bregenzerwald in the Alps Hockey League (AlpsHL). He previously played with HIFK in the Finnish Liiga.

Nyqvist made his SM-liiga debut playing with HIFK during the 2012–13 SM-liiga season.

Outside of Finland, Nyqvist has since had spells with UK EIHL side Edinburgh Capitals and Danish clubs Gentofte Stars and Rødovre Mighty Bulls.
