= Michal Důras =

Czech ice hockey player

- Born: November 22, 1981 (age 43); Jihlava, Czechoslovakia
- Height: 5 ft 11 in (180 cm)
- Weight: 181 lb (82 kg; 12 st 13 lb)
- Position: Forward
- Shoots: Left
- Ligue Magnus team Former teams: Étoile Noire de Strasbourg; HC Plzeň; BK Mladá Boleslav; HC Zlín; Piráti Chomutov
- Playing career: 2000–present

Michal Důras (born November 22, 1981) is a Czech professional ice hockey forward who currently plays for Étoile Noire de Strasbourg in the Ligue Magnus. He previously played in the Czech Extraliga for HC Plzeň, BK Mladá Boleslav, HC Zlín and Piráti Chomutov.
