= Rod Sarich =

Canadian-British ice hockey player

- Born: March 23, 1981 (age 45) Bladworth, Saskatchewan, Canada
- Height: 6 ft 3 in (191 cm)
- Weight: 185 lb (84 kg; 13 st 3 lb)
- Position: Defence
- Shot: Left
- Played for: Louisiana IceGators; Espoo Blues; Augusta Lynx; Sheffield Steelers
- National team: Great Britain
- NHL draft: 109th overall, 1999; Florida Panthers
- Playing career: 2002–2017

Rod Sarich (born March 23, 1981) is a Canadian-British former professional ice hockey defenceman.

== Career ==
Before turning professional, Sarich played junior hockey in the Western Hockey League for the Calgary Hitmen. He was drafted 109th overall by the Florida Panthers in the 1999 NHL entry draft but played in the NHL. Sarich began his professional career in 2002 with the Louisiana IceGators of the East Coast Hockey League. The following season, he moved to Finland and signed for the Espoo Blues of the SM-liiga, but after just twenty games and one assist, he was released from the team and he returned to the IceGators to close the 2003–04 season.

He then played for the Augusta Lynx before signing for the Sheffield Steelers of the Elite Ice Hockey League in the United Kingdom in 2005. Sarich would spend the rest of his career with the Steelers, playing eleven seasons with the team where he won four Elite League titles and three playoff titles. He retired in 2017.

== International play ==
Although Canadian by birth, Sarich opted to play for Great Britain and made his debut in February 2013 during the Olympic qualifiers.

== Personal life ==
Sarich is the younger brother of Cory Sarich and the brother-in-law of Nick Schultz.
