= Daniel Enqvist =

Finnish footballer (born 2001)

Personal information
- Date of birth: 17 September 2001 (age 25)
- Place of birth: Finland
- Height: 1.85 m (6 ft 1 in)
- Position: Left back

Team information
- Current team: Haka
- Number: 25

Youth career
- IIF
- BK-46
- KaaPo
- 2017: EIF
- 2018–2020: Åtvidaberg

Senior career*
Years	Team	Apps	(Gls)
2019–2020	Åtvidaberg	0	(0)
2021–2022	Pargas IF	44	(0)
2023–2025	IFK Mariehamn	62	(3)
2026–	Haka	7	(1)

International career^{‡}
2019	Finland U18	1	(0)
- * Club domestic league appearances and goals as of 1 November 2026 ‡ National team caps and goals as of 1 April 2024

Daniel Enqvist (born 17 September 2001) is a Finnish professional footballer who plays as a left back for Ykkösliiga club Haka.
