= Laurence E. Nyquist =

American planetary scientist (1939–2026)

Laurence E. Nyquist (July 28, 1939 – August 5, 2026) was an American planetary scientist for the National Aeronautics and Space Administration. He was known for his contributions to knowledge of the chronometry of planetary materials, which have been important in understanding time-scales for accretion, differentiation, and impacts on meteorite parent bodies. His NASA biography also records contributions to the study of noble gases in iron meteorites and lunar samples, radiometric age dating and isotope geochemistry of lunar, Martian, and meteoric samples, and the application of stable isotope methods to biomedical research. He served as an associate editor of Geochimica et Cosmochimica Acta and Proceedings of the Lunar and Planetary Science Conference.

Nyquist received a B.A. in physics and mathematics from Macalester College in 1961, an M.S. and Ph.D., both in physics, from the University of Minnesota in 1963 and 1969, respectively. 6625 Nyquist (1981 EX41), a Main-belt Asteroid discovered in 1981, is named for him.

Nyquist died on August 5, 2026, at the age of 87.
