= Simon Enqvist =

Finnish footballer (born 1988)

Personal information
- Date of birth: 2 October 1988 (age 38)
- Height: 1.90 m (6 ft 3 in)
- Position: Goalkeeper

Senior career*
Years	Team	Apps	(Gls)
2005	IF Östernäskamraterna		
2006–2007	Hammarlands IK		
2008	IF Finströms Kamraterna		
2008–2010	IFK Mariehamn	5	(0)
2009	→ Sunds IFFK (loan)		

International career
2009	Åland Islands	5	(0)
- * Club domestic league appearances and goals as of 12 October 2009

Simon Enqvist (born 2 October 1988) is a Finnish football goalkeeper.

After playing on low tiers in Sweden and Finland, Enqvist joined IF Finströms Kamraterna in the 2008 Kakkonen before being picked up by first-tier club IFK Mariehamn in the same season. He played 5 games in the 2008 Veikkausliiga. After spending 2009 in another club, he returned to Mariehamn in 2010 without playing. He also played 5 games for the Åland Islands official football team in the 2009 Island Games.
