= Enquist =

Enquist is a surname of Swedish origin which may refer to:

- Jan Enquist, Swedish rear admiral
- Jeff Enquist, American soccer player
- Lynn W. Enquist, American professor in molecular biology
- Brian J. Enquist, American professor in ecology
- Oskar Enquist, Imperial Russian vice admiral of Swedish descent
- Paul Enquist, American Olympic rower
- Per Olov Enquist, Swedish dramatist, playwright and novelist
- Sue Enquist, American softball player/coach

== See also ==
- Enqvist
