= Newcastle Vipers =

- City: Newcastle upon Tyne, England
- League: Elite Ice Hockey League
- Founded: 2002
- Operated: 2002–2011
- Home arena: Whitley Bay Ice Rink
- Colours: White, Black & Gold

From 2002 to 2011 the Newcastle Vipers were an ice hockey club based in Newcastle upon Tyne, England. The club was a member of the Elite Ice Hockey League, and the British National League.

== History ==
=== Predecessors ===
Previously, the city was represented by the Newcastle Jesters, who were founded in 1999 by Finnish businessman Harry Harkimo who purchased the franchise from the Ice Hockey Superleague.

The franchise had previously been owned by John Hall who had owned the club as part of his ambitious "Newcastle Sporting Club" project and known as the Newcastle Cobras and later the Newcastle Riverkings. The Cobras had previously played as the Durham Wasps who had moved to Newcastle upon Tyne Arena following a season at the Crowtree Leisure Centre in Sunderland as a result of Hall purchasing them after a number of years of financial problems. The Durham ice rink closed shortly thereafter.

=== Formation and playing history ===
The club was founded August 2002 after a season without a professional ice hockey team in Newcastle.

After playing its first three seasons in the British National League, the Vipers joined the Elite Ice Hockey League in the 2005–06 season along with the Edinburgh Capitals; a move which ultimately led to the dissolution of the BNL. During their first season the Vipers finished as runners-up to the Belfast Giants in the league and won the EIHL Play-Off Championship at the National Ice Centre, defeating the Sheffield Steelers 2–1 in the Grand Final.

=== Demise of the club ===
Due to low crowds and problems getting regular ice time at the Arena, in November 2010 the Vipers were forced to move in with rivals Whitley Warriors and play for part of their final season out of the Hillheads rink in Whitley Bay.

On 6 May 2011, the EIHL confirmed that the Vipers would fold and not take part in the 2011–12 season after months of financial difficulty, leaving the North East with no top-flight ice hockey club for 2011–12. GM Jaimie Longmuir said he was "Incredibly sad to confirm that the Vipers will no longer participate in the Elite League following Tuesday's meeting."

== Honours ==
- EIHL Play-Off Champions 2005–06
- Findus Cup Winners 2002–03, 2003–04
- Elite League Runners Up 2005–06
- EIHL First Team All-Stars
  - 2005–06 Trevor Koenig, Jan Krajíček
- EIHL Second Team All-Stars
  - 2005–06 Jonathan Weaver
  - 2006–07 Jonathan Weaver
  - 2008–09 Andrew Verner

== Retired jerseys ==
8. Shaun Johnson
34. Petri Rautiainen (retired by Newcastle Jesters)

== Media coverage (Vipers Hockey TV) ==
From September 2009 until March 2011 the students of Gateshead College's ND Media Production course filmed every home game and produced a weekly edited highlights package for the team website.

Preceded by Coventry Blaze	Playoff Champions; 2005–06	Succeeded by Nottingham Panthers
