= Heikki Laine (ice hockey) =

Finnish ice hockey player

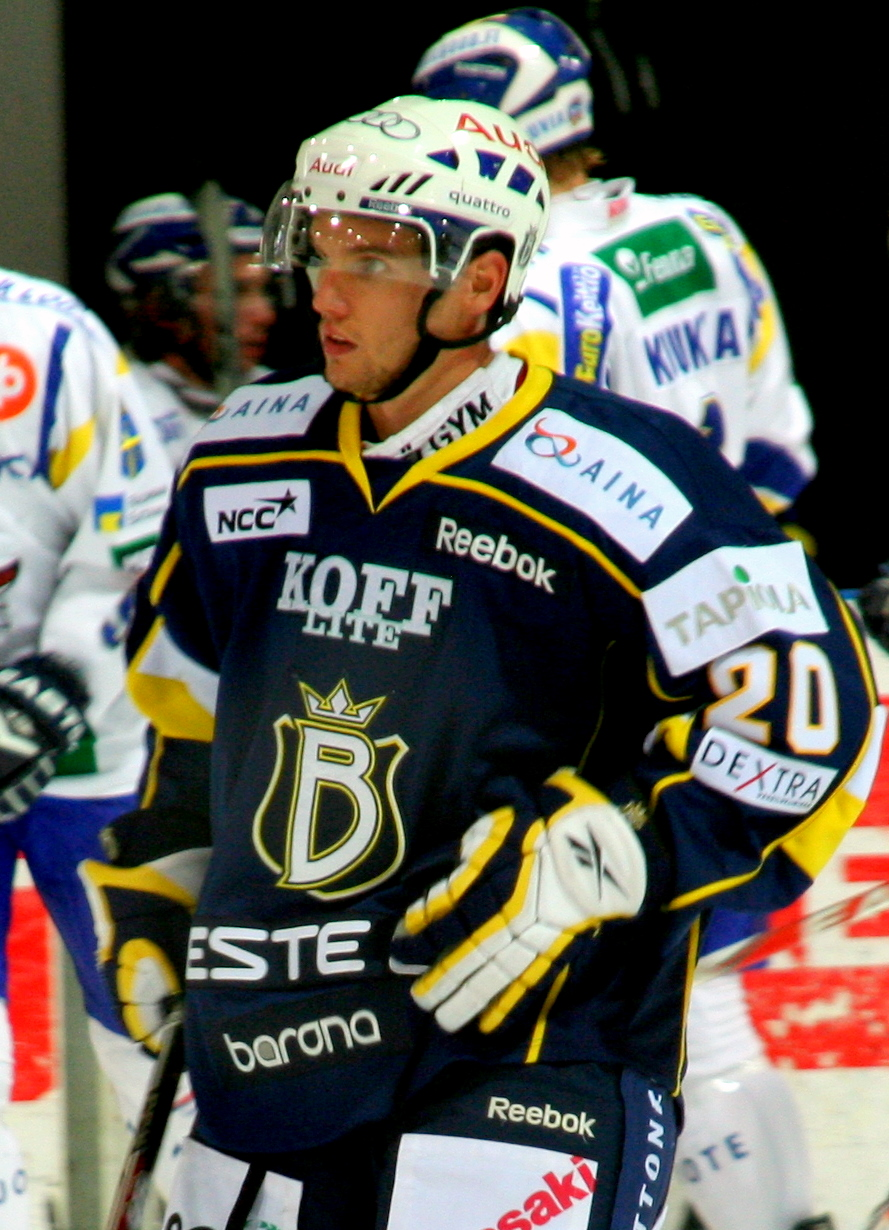
- Born: October 17, 1983 (age 43) Helsinki, Finland
- Height: 6 ft 1 in (185 cm)
- Weight: 185 lb (84 kg; 13 st 3 lb)
- Position: Right wing
- Shot: Left
- Played for: HIFK; JYP; Espoo Blues
- NHL draft: Undrafted
- Playing career: 2004–2011

Heikki Laine (born October 17, 1983) is a Finnish former professional ice hockey forward.

Laine played 106 regular season games in the Finnish Liiga with HIFK, JYP and Espoo Blues.

== Career statistics ==
| | | | Regular season | | | | | Playoffs |
| Season | Team | League | GP | G | A | Pts | PIM | GP | G | A | Pts | PIM |
|---|---|---|---|---|---|---|---|---|---|---|---|---|
| 2000–01 | HIFK U18 | U18 SM-sarja | 28 | 11 | 4 | 15 | 40 | 5 | 0 | 1 | 1 | 8 |
| 2000–01 | HIFK U20 | U20 SM-liiga | 8 | 0 | 1 | 1 | 4 | 4 | 0 | 0 | 0 | 0 |
| 2001–02 | HIFK U20 | U20 SM-liiga | 25 | 5 | 10 | 15 | 28 | 5 | 0 | 0 | 0 | 2 |
| 2002–03 | HIFK U20 | U20 SM-liiga | 26 | 5 | 8 | 13 | 20 | 10 | 1 | 4 | 5 | 4 |
| 2003–04 | HIFK U20 | U20 SM-liiga | 33 | 7 | 6 | 13 | 79 | 10 | 1 | 1 | 2 | 12 |
| 2004–05 | HC Salamat | Mestis | 34 | 5 | 2 | 7 | 83 | 3 | 1 | 0 | 1 | 25 |
| 2004–05 | HIFK | SM-liiga | 5 | 0 | 0 | 0 | 2 | — | — | — | — | — |
| 2005–06 | HIFK | SM-liiga | 35 | 0 | 1 | 1 | 82 | 3 | 0 | 0 | 0 | 29 |
| 2005–06 | Kiekko-Vantaa | Mestis | 4 | 0 | 0 | 0 | 6 | — | — | — | — | — |
| 2006–07 | HIFK | SM-liiga | 38 | 1 | 1 | 2 | 10 | 3 | 0 | 0 | 0 | 2 |
| 2006–07 | HC Salamat | Mestis | 4 | 1 | 0 | 1 | 4 | — | — | — | — | — |
| 2007–08 | HC Salamat | Mestis | 26 | 8 | 5 | 13 | 24 | — | — | — | — | — |
| 2008–09 | D Team | Mestis | 18 | 1 | 4 | 5 | 16 | 3 | 0 | 0 | 0 | 8 |
| 2008–09 | JYP Jyväskylä | SM-liiga | 17 | 2 | 1 | 3 | 31 | — | — | — | — | — |
| 2009–10 | Étoile Noire de Strasbourg | Ligue Magnus | 24 | 5 | 1 | 6 | 32 | 6 | 2 | 1 | 3 | 4 |
| 2010–11 | Espoo Blues | SM-liiga | 11 | 0 | 0 | 0 | 10 | 3 | 0 | 0 | 0 | 2 |
| 2010–11 | Kiekko-Vantaa | Mestis | 16 | 1 | 3 | 4 | 6 | — | — | — | — | — |
| SM-liiga totals | | | 106 | 3 | 3 | 6 | 135 | 9 | 0 | 0 | 0 | 43 |
| Mestis totals | | | 102 | 16 | 14 | 30 | 129 | 6 | 1 | 0 | 1 | 31 |
