= Sergei Fokin (ice hockey) =

Russian ice hockey player

- Born: May 2, 1963 (age 61); Moscow, USSR
- Height: 6 ft 3 in (191 cm)
- Weight: 231 lb (105 kg; 16 st 7 lb)
- Position: Defence
- Shot: Left
- Played for: HC Spartak Moscow; Västerås IK; Färjestads BK; Malmö Redhawks
- National team: Russia
- Playing career: 1983–2005

Sergei Fokin (born May 2, 1963 in Moscow, Soviet Union) is a former professional Russian ice hockey player.

He started his career in the Soviet Union in 1983, playing for Crystal Saratov. In 1984 he signed with Spartak Moskva and he stayed with them until 1992, when he moved to Sweden and sign with VIK Västerås HK, where he joined fellow countryman Mishat Fahrutdinov. After two season with Västerås, he signed for another Swedish team, Färjestads BK, a team that he wouldn't leave until 2002. During his time with Färjestad he won three Swedish Championships, 1997, 1998 and 2002. When he left Färjestad, he called it his retirement and he signed with a lower league team Borås HC. But during his first season with Borås was he was loaned to Malmö Redhawks for a couple of games. But these were his last games at the top level. He played two more seasons with Borås HC and in 2005 retired from ice hockey.

He represented Russia in four Hockey World Championships.

== Career statistics ==
			Regular season					Playoffs
Season	Team	League	GP	G	A	Pts	PIM	GP	G	A	Pts	PIM
1983–84	Kristall Saratov	USSR-2	57	4	?	?	?	—	—	—	—	—
1984–85	Spartak Moscow	USSR	48	3	4	7	40	—	—	—	—	—
1985–86	Spartak Moscow	USSR	38	4	7	11	28	—	—	—	—	—
1986–87	Spartak Moscow	USSR	22	3	4	7	22	—	—	—	—	—
1987–88	Spartak Moscow	USSR	41	1	4	5	30	—	—	—	—	—
1988–89	Spartak Moscow	USSR	41	3	7	10	33	—	—	—	—	—
1989–90	Spartak Moscow	USSR	46	2	10	12	30	—	—	—	—	—
1990–91	Spartak Moscow	USSR	27	3	4	7	41	—	—	—	—	—
1991–92	Spartak Moscow	CIS	36	4	11	15	10	6	0	0	0	0
1992–93	VIK Västerås HK	SEL	36	4	14	18	36	3	1	1	2	0
1993–94	VIK Västerås HK	SEL	39	2	6	8	45	4	0	0	0	4
1994–95	Färjestads BK	SEL	39	8	5	13	32	4	0	2	2	0
1995–96	Färjestads BK	SEL	39	4	3	7	36	8	0	0	0	4
1996–97	Färjestads BK	SEL	50	5	10	15	54	14	1	7	8	34
1997–98	Färjestads BK	SEL	46	5	12	17	20	12	0	4	4	8
1998–99	Färjestads BK	SEL	49	3	4	7	46	4	0	1	1	2
1999–00	Färjestads BK	SEL	50	5	10	15	50	7	0	0	0	10
2000–01	Färjestads BK	SEL	43	5	6	11	34	15	0	1	1	39
2001–02	Färjestads BK	SEL	48	6	5	11	24	10	0	3	3	16
2002–03	Borås HC	SWE-2	?	6	20	26	?	—	—	—	—	—
2002–03	Malmö Redhawks	SEL	4	1	0	1	0	—	—	—	—	—
2003–04	Borås HC	SWE-2	?	1	13	14	?	—	—	—	—	—
2004–05	Borås HC	SWE-2	23	4	8	12	12	—	—	—	—	—

=== International statistics ===
Year	Team	Event	Place	GP	G	A	Pts	PIM
1995	Russia	WC	5th	6	0	1	1	6
1996	Russia	WC	4th	8	0	0	0	4
1997	Russia	WC	4th	9	0	2	2	6
1998	Russia	WC	5th	6	0	0	0	0
Senior Int'l Totals				29	0	3	3	16
