= Ann-Christin Nykvist =

Swedish politician (born 1948)

Personal details
- Born: 4 April 1948 (age 78)
- Party: Social Democratic
- Education: Stockholm School of Economics

Ann-Christin Nykvist (born 4 April 1948) is a Swedish Social Democratic politician. She was minister for agriculture, food and consumer affairs in the Cabinet of Göran Persson. She holds a bachelor of Arts in economics from the Stockholm School of Economics. Prior to her appointment in 2002, she worked as the head of the Swedish Competition Authority.
