= Andrew Verner =

Canadian ice hockey player

- Born: November 20, 1972 (age 53) York, Ontario, Canada
- Height: 6 ft 0 in (183 cm)
- Weight: 194 lb (88 kg; 13 st 12 lb)
- Position: Goaltender
- Caught: Left
- Played for: Sheffield Steelers (EIHL); Newcastle Vipers (EIHL); EC KAC (Aus); Hannover Scorpions (DEL); Kölner Haie (DEL); Malmö IF (Sweden); HPK (Finland); EHC Lustenau (Austria); Cape Breton Oilers (AHL)
- National team: Canada
- NHL draft: 34th overall, 1991; Edmonton Oilers
- Playing career: 1992–2010

Andrew Verner
Medal record

Men's ice hockey

Representing Canada

World Championships
| Bronze medal – third place | 1995 Sweden | Ice hockey |

Andrew Verner (born November 20, 1972) is a Canadian retired ice hockey goaltender. He most recently played for Sheffield Steelers, in the UK's Elite Ice Hockey League.

== Playing career ==
Verner was born in York, Ontario. He played junior hockey in the Ontario Hockey League for the Peterborough Petes. He was drafted 34th overall by the Edmonton Oilers in the 1991 NHL entry draft, but spent three seasons playing in the American Hockey League for the Cape Breton Oilers and never managed to play in the NHL.

Since 1995, Verner has played in European leagues, beginning with a spell in Austria for EHC Lustenau, followed by a season in Finland's SM-liiga with HPK where he served as the team's starting goalie. He then spent two seasons in Sweden playing in the Elitserien with Malmö IF. He moved to the Deutsche Eishockey Liga in Germany, spending two seasons with the Kölner Haie and two seasons with the Hannover Scorpions. He returned to Austria to play for EC KAC in 2003 and stayed with the team until 2008, when he joined the Newcastle Vipers in the United Kingdom.

He spent the 08/09 season playing for the Newcastle Vipers in the UK's Elite Ice Hockey League. At the end of that season, he was made a free agent before signing for Sheffield Steelers in October '09 as a replacement for injured goalie Kevin Reiter. In 2010, Verner retired after playing 17 professional seasons.

On May 2, 2012, the Peterborough Petes hired Verner as their new full-time goaltending coach, taking over for Ron Tugnutt, who stepped aside as the team's goaltending consultant after two seasons.

On August 21, 2014, The Peterborough Petes named Verner as an Assistant Coach serving under Head Coach Jody Hull. On January 5, 2018, was named the interim head coach of the Petes. He was an Associate Coach when the Petes won the OHL championship in 2022-2023.
