= Pasi Sormunen =

Finnish ice hockey player

- Born: March 8, 1970 (age 56) Kauniainen, Finland
- Height: 6 ft 1 in (185 cm)
- Weight: 209 lb (95 kg; 14 st 13 lb)
- Position: Defense
- Shot: Right
- Played for: HIFK; Jokerit; Espoo Blues; Nürnberg Ice Tigers; EHC Chur; Västra Frölunda HC
- National team: Finland
- NHL draft: Undrafted
- Playing career: 1990–2002

Pasi Martti Sormunen (born March 8, 1970, in Kauniainen, Finland) is a Finnish retired professional ice hockey player who played in the SM-liiga.

== Playing career ==
He played for HIFK, Jokerit, and Espoo Blues. He also won a bronze medal at the 1994 Winter Olympics.

== Career statistics ==
=== Regular season and playoffs ===
			Regular season					Playoffs
Season	Team	League	GP	G	A	Pts	PIM	GP	G	A	Pts	PIM
1987–88	EVU	FIN II Jr	28	7	8	15	54	—	—	—	—	—
1988–89	HIFK	FIN Jr	35	6	11	17	70	3	1	0	1	0
1989–90	HIFK	FIN Jr	32	6	10	16	63	4	2	3	5	16
1990–91	Karhu-Kissat	FIN II	41	3	15	18	44	—	—	—	—	—
1991–92	Karhu-Kissat	FIN II	14	1	1	2	39	—	—	—	—	—
1991–92	HIFK	Liiga	24	1	1	2	14	9	0	2	2	4
1992–93	HIFK	Liiga	48	4	8	12	24	4	0	0	0	2
1993–94	HIFK	Liiga	44	8	7	15	40	3	1	0	1	2
1993–94	Karhu-Kissat	FIN II	1	1	2	3	2	—	—	—	—	—
1994–95	Jokerit	Liiga	41	4	2	6	22	11	2	4	6	6
1995–96	Jokerit	Liiga	43	1	7	8	44	5	1	0	1	2
1996–97	Jokerit	Liiga	38	5	18	23	54	—	—	—	—	—
1997–98	Jokerit	Liiga	37	4	8	12	46	8	0	4	4	6
1998–99	Espoo Blues	Liiga	45	4	11	15	32	3	3	0	3	20
1999–2000	Espoo Blues	Liiga	9	0	1	1	6	4	0	0	0	0
1999–2000	Nürnberg Ice Tigers	DEL	21	0	11	11	4	—	—	—	—	—
2000–01	EHC Chur	NLA	35	4	13	17	58	—	—	—	—	—
2001–02	Västra Frölunda HC	SEL	35	5	9	14	63	8	0	1	1	6
Liiga totals			329	31	63	94	282	47	7	10	17	42

=== International ===
Year	Team	Event	GP	G	A	Pts	PIM
1994	Finland	OG	7	0	0	0	10
