= Jan Krajíček =

Czech ice hockey player

- Born: 8 November 1971 (age 53); Prostějov, Czechoslovakia
- Height: 6 ft 4 in (193 cm)
- Weight: 225 lb (102 kg; 16 st 1 lb)
- Position: Defence
- Shot: Left
- Played for: HC Zlín; HC Slezan Opava; HC Slavia Praha; HK 36 Skalica; Newcastle Vipers; Nottingham Panthers
- National team: Czech Republic
- Playing career: 1990–2013

Jan Krajíček (born 8 November 1971) is a Czech former professional ice hockey defenceman.

Krajíček played in the Czech Extraliga for HC Zlín, HC Slezan Opava and HC Slavia Praha. He also played in the Slovak Extraliga for HK 36 Skalica and in the Elite Ice Hockey League for the Newcastle Vipers and the Nottingham Panthers. In 2008 he joined HK Jestřábi Prostějov, where he became club captain.

He is the older brother of former NHL player Lukáš Krajíček.
