= Matt Beca =

Canadian professional ice hockey player

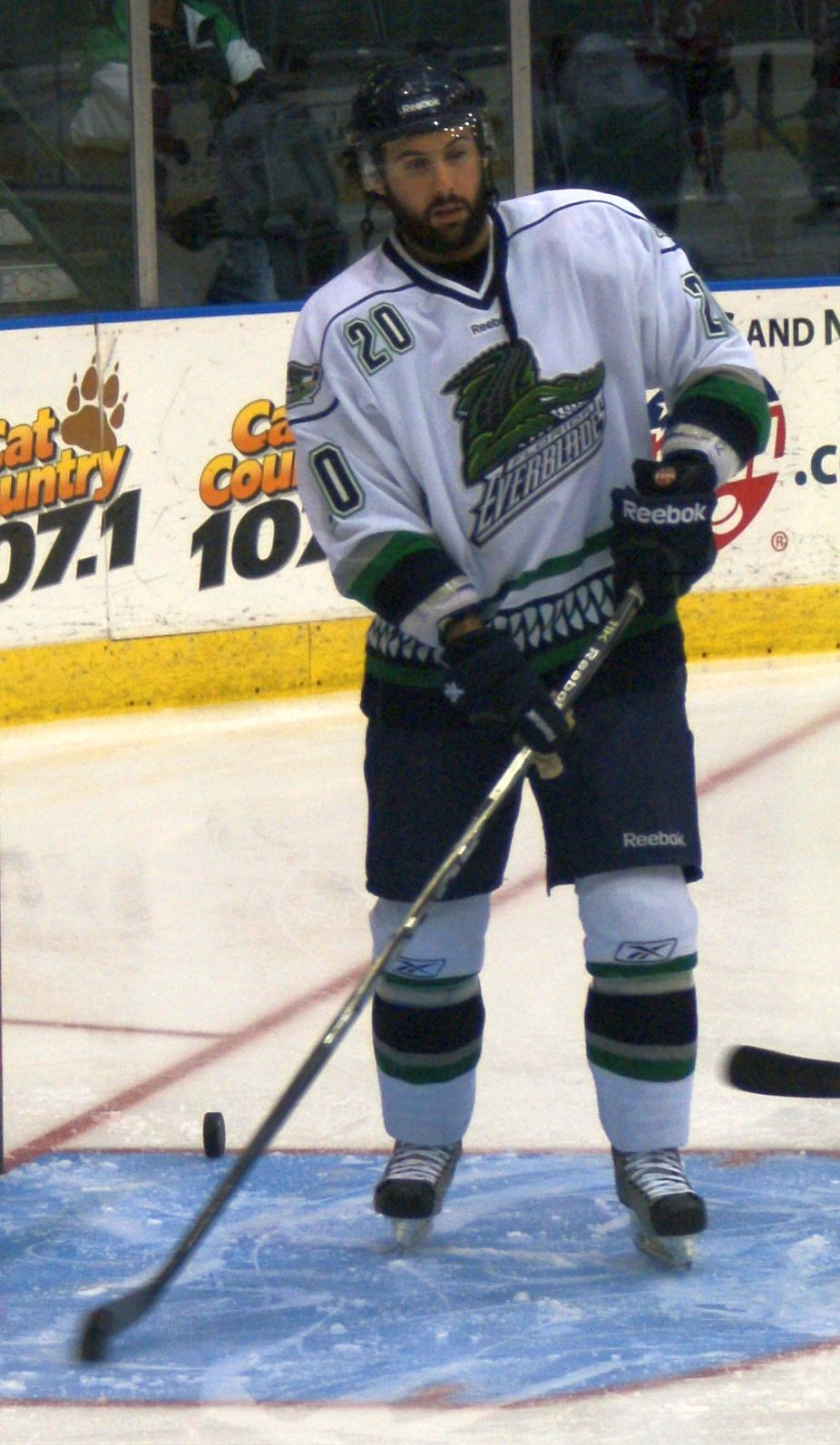
- Born: March 6, 1986 (age 39) Mississauga, Ontario, Canada
- Height: 5 ft 10 in (178 cm)
- Weight: 181 lb (82 kg; 12 st 13 lb)
- Position: Forward
- Shot: Right
- Played for: Springfield Falcons; Charlotte Checkers; RT Bad Nauheim; Braehead Clan; Manchester Storm; Glasgow Clan
- NHL draft: Undrafted
- Playing career: 2010–2020

Matt Beca (born March 6, 1986) is a retired Canadian professional ice hockey player. He last played for Glasgow Clan of the EIHL, where he was player/assistant coach. He previously played for fellow Elite League side Manchester Storm and Rote Teufel Bad Nauheim of the DEL2.

== Playing career ==
Prior to turning professional, Beca attended Clarkson University, where he played four seasons of college hockey with the NCAA Division I Clarkson Golden Knights men's ice hockey team. Beca was a freshman with the Golden Knights when they won the 2006-07 ECAC conference tournament, and he was named as the team's most valuable player, winning the Bill Harrison MVP Award, during his senior year.

During the 2012–13 season, Beca compiled 23 points in 31 games for the Everblades before he was reassigned by the Checkers as part of a trade for Matthew Pistilli to the South Carolina Stingrays on December 31, 2012.

After four seasons of professional hockey in North America, Beca left to sign his first European contract with German club, Rote Teufel Bad Nauheim of the DEL2 on July 28, 2013.

Ahead of the 2016/17 season, Beca signed for Braehead Clan of the UK's EIHL, putting up 83 points in 62 league and cup games. On 14 July 2017, Beca followed former Braehead coach Ryan Finnerty to sign for Manchester Storm. In doing so, Beca re-joined former Braehead teammates Jay Rosehill and Mike Hammond who had both signed for the club earlier in the summer.

Beca rejoined the newly renamed Glasgow Clan ahead of the 2018-19 season, spending a further two campaigns with the team before retirement.

== Career statistics ==
			Regular season					Playoffs
Season	Team	League	GP	G	A	Pts	PIM	GP	G	A	Pts	PIM
2002–03	Brampton Capitals	OPJHL	49	15	30	45	30	—	—	—	—	—
2003–04	Hamilton Red Wings	OPJHL	41	17	26	43	25	—	—	—	—	—
2004–05	Oakville Blades	OPJHL	49	24	52	76	26	—	—	—	—	—
2005–06	Oakville Blades	OPJHL	49	43	43	86	54	23	20	22	42	39
2006–07	Clarkson University	ECAC	38	10	17	27	14	—	—	—	—	—
2007–08	Clarkson University	ECAC	39	10	24	34	10	—	—	—	—	—
2008–09	Clarkson University	ECAC	35	11	13	24	18	—	—	—	—	—
2009–10	Clarkson University	ECAC	37	20	18	38	40	—	—	—	—	—
2009–10	Springfield Falcons	AHL	5	1	0	1	4	—	—	—	—	—
2010–11	Florida Everblades	ECHL	62	22	28	50	34	4	1	1	2	2
2011–12	Florida Everblades	ECHL	62	21	39	60	43	18	5	9	14	0
2011–12	Charlotte Checkers	AHL	7	0	1	1	0	—	—	—	—	—
2012–13	Florida Everblades	ECHL	31	7	16	23	18	—	—	—	—	—
2012–13	South Carolina Stingrays	ECHL	11	5	5	10	2	—	—	—	—	—
2012–13	Charlotte Checkers	AHL	32	5	7	12	10	2	0	0	0	0
2013–14	RT Bad Nauheim	DEL2	54	23	36	59	44	—	—	—	—	—
2014–15	RT Bad Nauheim	DEL2	51	18	33	51	66	—	—	—	—	—
2015–16	Valpellice	Italy	23	10	14	24	14	—	—	—	—	—
2015–16	HK Nitra	Slovak	12	4	4	8	4	17	1	8	9	8
2016–17	Braehead Clan	EIHL	52	27	48	75	28	2	0	0	0	0
2017–18	Manchester Storm	EIHL	56	24	51	75	14	2	1	0	1	2
2018–19	Glasgow Clan	EIHL	60	26	42	68	18	2	0	0	0	0
2019–20	Glasgow Clan	EIHL	39	13	15	28	40	—	—	—	—	—
AHL totals			44	6	8	14	14	2	0	0	0	0

== Awards and honours ==
Award	Year
ECAC Hockey Tournament Championship	2006–07
All-ECAC Hockey Third Team	2007–08
