= Glasgow Clan =

- City: Glasgow, Scotland
- League: Elite Ice Hockey League
- Founded: 2010 (as Braehead Clan)
- Home arena: Braehead Arena (capacity: 4,000)
- Colours: Purple, white, black
- Owner: Michael O'Rourke
- CEO: Russell Smith
- Head coach: Jack Skille
- Captain: Deven Sideroff
- Affiliates: Solway Sharks, NIHL; Paisley Pirates, SNL
Home colours	Away colours	Third colours

Franchise history
- 2010–2018: Braehead Clan
- 2018–Present: Glasgow Clan

The Glasgow Clan are a Scottish professional ice hockey team based in Renfrew, near Glasgow. It was formed in 2010 as the UK Elite Ice Hockey League expanded into the west of Scotland market, and are based at the Braehead Arena in Renfrewshire. It is one of three Scottish clubs playing in the top British league alongside Dundee Stars and the Fife Flyers.

In July 2018, the team officially rebranded from the Braehead Clan to the Glasgow Clan.

== History ==
Braehead Arena previously hosted the Scottish Eagles ice hockey team for a brief period at beginning of the 2002–03 ISL season following their relocation from Ayr. The Eagles disbanded in November 2002 due to financial troubles. When the Superleague's successor, the Elite Ice Hockey League was formed, initial plans included a new Glasgow-based team as being amongst the founding clubs, but this never materialised.

Following the 2008–09 season, the Elite League lost two teams with the resignations of the Basingstoke Bison and Manchester Phoenix, leaving the league with eight participating teams for the 2009–10 season. The Elite League subsequently announced the formation of the Braehead Clan as a ninth team from the 2010–11 season. The team's ownership was announced as consisting of several of the Elite League's existing team owners, including Nottingham's Neil Black.

The club began marketing the team through the creation of the 'Braehearts', these were female supporters who would promote the team at events and in the community, wearing specially created 'Braehearts' jerseys similar to those of the team's home jerseys. The club also held open days which were designed to attract new support. With the arena being based next to the Braehead Shopping Mall, this gave the club good opportunity to further attract new supporters. The Braehead Clan fans are known as the Purple Army.

=== 2010–11 season ===
After being formed early in 2010 the club announced that Adam Calder would become the first coach of the Braehead Clan taking up a player/coach role for the upcoming season. The club also announced that Kirsty Longmuir would be the general manager tasked with the job of marketing the new club to potential supporters.

Rumours began circulating in late April that Calder had resigned from the Clan only two weeks after being announced as the player/coach for the new Elite league side. On 4 May, the Braehead Clan announced official confirmation of Calder's departure on their website.

On 5 May, it was announced that Canadian forward Bruce Richardson would replace Adam Calder as player/coach of the Braehead Clan. Bruce Richardson had spent the past two seasons as player/assistant coach for Elite League rivals, Nottingham Panthers.

Richardson moved quickly to announce his first signings, three young British players who had previously played in the English Premier League: Sam Bullas, 19, who was trained in Nottingham and previously played for Swindon Wildcats; Matthew Haywood, 19, from Sheffield, who was the leading goalscorer for Sheffield Scimitars during the 2009–10 season; and Adam Walker, 23, who spent the previous four seasons with Manchester Phoenix.

Richardson's fourth signing would be another key British player, Kevin Phillips, 24, who spent the previous season with the play-off winning Belfast Giants.

On 19 May, the Clan announced Derek Patrosso as their first import signing. He spent the previous two seasons with Port Huron Icehawks in the International Hockey League. The following day it was announced that the Clan had signed two more British players: defenceman John Connolly, 19, from Scottish rivals Edinburgh Capitals; and forward Shaun Thompson, 22, who split the previous season with Elite League side Hull Stingrays and English Premier League's Basingstoke Bison.

Mathieu Wathier was the Clans next signing, a 6 ft 1 tall defenceman from, Les Coteaux, Quebec, who had spent the last two years playing in the French Ligue Magnus. Player/Coach Bruce Richardson described the signing saying Wathier would be "solid defensively, a leader, and strong on the penalty kill".

Richardson's next signing was ex-teammate Tim Wedderburn, a 28-year-old defenseman who played the previous season in both the ECHL with the Victoria Salmon Kings, and in the AHL with Lake Erie Monsters. Bobby Chaumont was Richardson's next signing. The Canadian forward spent the previous two seasons in the CHL with the Mississippi RiverKings, scoring 48 points in 64 games in his last season with the club.

After a dry spell in recent signings, Richardson announced his enforcer for the season, 25-year-old Cedrick Bernier. Bernier has racked up 548 penalty minutes in the previous 4 seasons, playing in various leagues such as the SPHL, CHL, and ECHL. Richardson stated Bernier wanted to prove that he was "the toughest guy in the Elite League". He did not, breaking his hand in a fight early in the season, returning for a few games before going out with an injury again. A mutual decision was then reached that he was to be let go from the club.

On 1 July, the Clan announced that Derek Patrosso would not be joining Braehead team for their first season, and instead would stay in his native America for the upcoming season. Positive news followed, with the club announcing they had agreed terms with Brendan Cook, 27, a teammate of Bruce Richardson at the Nottingham Panthers during the 2008–09 season, where he scored 70 points in 54 games (30 goals and 40 assists).

Cody Bostock, 26, was the next import announced by the club. The Canadian defenseman previously played for Odense Bulldogs in the Danish Oddset Ligaen, and was brought in by Richardson to "solidify" the club's defensive core.

=== 2011–12 season ===
In June 2011, Bruce Richardson unexpectedly resigned from the club, after being offered a coaching post near his family home in Canada. Since joining the Clan, Richardson had always made clear his intention to progress his coaching as far as possible, and had received advice that to become an established coach in North American leagues would mean building experience there. He also stated a wish to settle his family, who had moved around the world over the course of his playing career.

On 29 July, the club announced former NHL player Drew Bannister as the new head coach for the 2011–12 season.

On ice, Braehead finished 6th in the league, finishing just one point behind 4th and 5th place. They reached the quarter finals of the Challenge Cup and the play-offs, being knocked out by the Nottingham Panthers in both competitions. They had some stand out results, winning 4–1 in Belfast and 7–4 in Hull (with players out injured and back up netminder Mike Will in goal). Clan had a largely inconsistent season going on lengthy winning streaks beating top teams to bad losing streaks against teams nearer the bottom of the table.

Braehead finished the season being the only EIHL team to have beaten and lost to each of the other nine teams at least once.

=== 2012–13 season ===
Early in the 2012 close season Clan announced the re-signing of Brits Matthew Haywood, Adam Walker, Sam Zajac and Kevin Phillips and also Canadian Brock McPherson. On 30 April 2012, Clan announced the signing of Scottish born forward Ryan Watt from EPL side Slough Jets. Back up British goaltender Mike Will was also re-signed for this season. On 14 May, Clan announced that Jordan Krestanovich would be coming back and retaining his role as captain of the team.

All these signings were made despite having not yet revealed the coach for the 2012–13 season.

On 16 May, Braehead announced that Drew Bannister would also be re-signing for his second season as player/coach, news that many Clan fans had been hoping for.

However, on 1 June, Owen Sound Attack of the OHL announced that they had hired Drew Bannister as Assistant Coach for the forthcoming season, news that angered many Clan fans as they felt he had gone behind the Clan's back and signed for Attack without any regard to his current contract or without informing anybody at Braehead.

Braehead announced that bench coach Frank Morris had signed for the following season on 12 June, revealing that he had already been working alongside GM Kirsty Longmuir to recruit new players.

On 15 June, Braehead confirmed that Jordan Krestanovich would be the player/coach for the following 2012–13 season. Krestanovich said, "I think the Clan has accomplished so much both on and off the ice in their short existence, but I think there is room for improvement and progression. The foundations are laid, and I look forward to building a team that will be competitive on the ice, but that will also be hungry to win."

The first signing of the Krestanovich era was announced one week later and was none other than fan favourite Jade Galbraith who had scored an EIHL record 101 points during the previous season. Galbraith re-signed as player/assistant coach to Krestanovich.

The following Monday it was revealed that 33-year-old Canadian forward Ryan Campbell would return for his third season with Braehead and become the first signing of the Krestanovich/Galbraith era. That same week Clan revealed they had signed their first import defenseman of the close season, Canadian born Mitch Maunu. The official Clan website described Maunu as a 'hard hitting defenseman'.

The next signing was 31-year-old Canadian forward Ash Goldie. Krestanovich said when speaking of Goldie, "I expect big things from Ash this year. I truly believe he could lead the league in goals this year." The signing of former Fife Flyers goaltender, 23-year-old Garrett Zemlak was revealed on 13 July. The final forward of Braehead's 2012–13 season roster was to be Canadian Bobby Chaumont, who had played for Clan in their debut 2010–11 season before moving on to America for one season to play for Fort Wayne Komets.

After a summer of rumours linking Steve Birnstill to Clan, the American defenseman signing was finally announced on 27 July. Canadian defenseman Matt Hanson was next for Braehead, having spent the previous season playing for Laredo Bucks - his signing was announced on 6 August. The signing of young Brit forward Robert Farmer was announced after his move to Kazakhstan from Coventry Blaze did not work out. Young Brits Aidan Fulton and goaltender Gary Russell were signed on dual contracts with Solway Sharks in hope to give the two experience of regular games and playing with a top-level team. On 21 September, the sixth defender of Clan's roster was finally revealed, this was Finnish/Italian Pippo Limnell Finocchiaro. Finocchiaro was to depart the club without playing a game. On 10 October, it was announced that Drew Miller of the Detroit Red Wings would play for Braehead on a lockout contract during the 2012–13 NHL lockout.

Following a shaky start to the season defensively, Clan signed Craig Mitchell on a dual contract with Solway Sharks and also Canadian/Italian defenseman Davide Nicoletti. It was announced, on 12 November, that Bobby Chaumont and Ryan Campbell had been released from the club with immediate effect. On 27 November the club announced that they had signed Czech defenceman Martin Tůma from Nottingham Panthers and also a major coup with the signing of former AHL star forward Jesse Schultz. This signing fell through, however, on 10 December.

=== 2013–14 season ===
The club announced that Paul Gardner would not be returning to coach the team and his successor Ryan Finnerty was confirmed as the new head coach of the Braehead Clan, joining the team from the Sheffield Steelers. Matt Haywood was announced as a returnee from the season before as well as Aiden Fulton and Craig Mitchell signing on full-time deals. Chris Frank and Shane Lust were confirmed as new signings, along with Kevin Bergin as a player/assistant coach. Finnerty continued to bring in players such as the Brit duo of Tristan Harper from the Dundee Stars and Lee Esders, joining Finnerty from the Sheffield Steelers. Veteran forward Ed McGrane was announced as one of the Clan's major signings, along with the return of captain Ash Goldie. Two more returnees in the form of backup netminder Mike Will and defenceman Sam Zajac were announced. The final signing before the season began with announced as former Toronto Maple Leafs prospect Joel Champagne. Braehead finished the season in 5th place in the league, but failed to retain the Gardiner Conference championship which they had won in the previous season, losing out to Scottish rivals Dundee Stars. The Clan however made history a couple weeks later by beating the Nottingham Panthers 9–1 on aggregate in the quarter-final of the Elite League play-offs, to become the first Scottish team ever to make the Rapid Solicitors Elite League Playoff Finals. They finished the season in a 3–2 loss to eventual Play-off champions the Sheffield Steelers in the semi-final.

=== 2014–15 season ===
Clan kicked off season 2014–15 with wholesale changes to the roster, ex-Chicago Blackhawks player Matt Keith stepped into the role of team Captain from the departing Ash Goldie and new faces Zack Fitzgerald, Stefan Meyer, Scott Pitt, Jamie Fritsch, Derek Roehl and Leigh Salters joined up with imports Kyle Jones, Chris Frank, Scott Aarssen and Neil Trimm. The team faced Italian champions Asiago for the Aladdin cup, eventually winning in a penalty shootout. The club went from strength to strength as the months rolled on, sitting near or at the top of the Elite League for much of the season. The on ice rivalry with Fife Flyers exploded as clashes between fighters Fitzgerald and Flyers' Matt Nickerson drew in record crowds with Braehead Arena regularly selling out. Power forward Leigh Salters and Captain Matt Keith became the engine room for the club feeding the high flying scorers Scott Pitt, Neil Trimm and Stefan Meyer up top. Clan won the Gardiner Conference with relative ease and the focus of the season shifted towards the push for the first Elite League title. Unfortunately, it wasn't to be, as Clan missed out on top spot by a single point, ending the season on 72 points behind Sheffield Steelers' 73. The silver-lining however was qualification to the Champions Hockey League, secured after a 3–2 win away in Kirkcaldy against rivals Fife Flyers in the final game of the regular season. Clan were eliminated in the play-off quarter finals by Hull Stingrays in an upset, haven taken a lead into the second leg, Hull took the final game to overtime and scored the overtime winner to end what should have been an otherwise marvellous season for the Clan on a second sour note for the purple army.

=== 2015–16 season ===
The club had reached the Champions Hockey League and were drawn against Swedish champions Vaxjo Lakers and German champions ERC Ingolstadt. Facing up against the best European hockey had to offer, the Clan finished third in the group, however pulled off an amazing result beating the German champions ERC Ingolstadt 6–4 at Braehead Arena. Recruitment saw fan favourites goaltender Kyle Jones and Chris Frank retire, Leigh Salters moved to Cardiff Devils and Zack Fitzgerald moved to Sheffield Steelers. Replacing them was the incoming ex-Stanley cup winning NHL defenceman Ric Jackman, KHL all-star Goaltender Chris Holt, Memorial Cup winner Chris Bruton and Kelly Cup and DEL2 winner Alex Leavitt. Another successful season looked possible for the Clan, however injuries began to play a part. The club lost goalie Chris Holt to injury and brought in Travis Fullerton in as cover, a long unbeaten streak was ended after injury's to key forwards Matt Keith and Scott Pitt. Chris Bruton was traded to Coventry Blaze mid-season for former Clan player Neil Trimm but the Clan couldn't regain their form. The Gardiner conference was again won and Clan finished in third place in the Elite League. Another shock exit in the play-offs again in over-time, this time to bitter rivals Fife Flyers. A disappointing season for a lot of the clan fans, pondering what could have been for the second season in a row.

=== 2016–17 season ===
During the summer months Goaltender Chris Holt retired and was replaced by Swedish goalie Michal Zajkowski, Stefan Meyer and Neil Trimm also retired. Ben Davies left the club to try out in the ECHL with Norfolk Admirals, while Ric Jackman and Brendan Brooks made the move to Fife Flyers. Coach Ryan Finnerty brought in veteran Jeff Ulmer, Trevor Hendrikx, Lee Baldwin, Cody Carlson, Daniel Ahsberg, Corey Cowick, Kyle Wharton, Matt Beca and ex-NHL enforcer Jay Rosehill to kick off the campaign. Clan began in pre-season by playing Belfast Giants for the Intu Cup however lost out on winning the competition. After a poor start to the season, marquee forward Jeff Ulmer and defenceman Trevor Hendrikx were released from their contracts, replaced by Harry Quast and Mike Hammond. The switch seemed to turn Clan's fortunes around as the trio of Scott Pitt, Matt Beca and Mike Hammond began a free scoring run that saw Pitt and Beca eventually end up as the League's top point scorers and finish in the EIHL all-star second team. Scott Pitt would also go on to become Braehead Clan's all-time top point and goal scorer during the season surpassing previous record holder Jade Galbraith. However, an injury to Mike Hammond in a home game against Sheffield Steelers in a collision with former Clan player Zack Fitzgerald ruled him out for the pivotal last few weeks of the season. After a mixed start and end to the campaign Clan finished in the middle of the pack in 5th place, after going eight home games unbeaten, Clan beat Dundee Stars 4–1 at home to clinch a third Gardiner Conference in a row to round off the regular season. Clan again faced off against Dundee Stars in the play-off quarter finals but yet again suffered a shock 4–1 defeat in the away leg and another 3–0 defeat during the home leg, knocking the Clan out in a 7–1 aggregate scoreline. The third year in a row Clan were eliminated from the play-offs by the lower seeded team.

=== 2017–18 season ===
In April 2017, the club announced that Ryan Finnerty would not be returning following the disappointing end to the last campaign. Instead, new coach John Tripp was installed, joining from DEL2 side ETC Crimmitschau. The former German Olympic ice hockey player was to take charge in what would be his first full season as an ice hockey coach. Former player Brendan Brooks was announced to join John as an assistant coach and team captain, returning to the Clan from rivals, Fife Flyers. Using his knowledge of the Germany hockey league's John Tripp recruited some familiar faces in Cameron Burt, Tyler Scofield, Ryan Nie and former NHL player Ryan Potulny to begin the season. Joining from North America were physical forwards Jacob Doty, Tyler Shattock and defenseman Landon Oslanski.

The Clan began the season with a busy pre-season schedule which saw them win a new Scottish Cup competition against Fife Flyers, Dundee Stars and Edinburgh Capitals, while also playing stand-alone pre-season games against Lowen Frankfurt and the University of Manitoba Bisons. Clan's season started off with a bang, winning at home in the Challenge Cup against former coach Ryan Finnerty's new team, Manchester Storm. In the coming few weeks Clan's form went up and down so a number of changes were made at playing level. The club introduced new captain Ville Hämäläinen, Brooks became an assistant captain alongside Craig Peacock and Ryan Potulny.

Clan's form, however, maintained its stop-start nature and numerous defeats to the hands of rivals Fife Flyers saw the club at the wrong end of the league table and chasing Fife in the Gardiner Conference. In February the team's form did eventually hit its stride and a run of impressive wins saw a late comeback, but the damage was already done and defeats in the final weekend by Nottingham Panthers and Guildford Flames consolidated Clan to its worst ever season, missing out on the Gardiner Conference to bitter rivals Fife Flyers and ending the regular season in 9th place, its lowest ever Elite League finish, and missing out on the EIHL playoffs for the first time in club history.

As a result of these poor results Coach John Tripp was released from his contract after one-year in the role and the club would start a new rebuild year for the coming season.

=== 2018–2020, club rebrand and coaching changes ===
In July 2018 the club rebranded to Glasgow Clan to reflect their proximity to the adjacent city, Glasgow.

They appointed Great Britain and Milton Keynes Lightning coach Pete Russell as their new head coach and enjoyed a better season in the 2018–19 EIHL season, regaining the Gardner Conference title and finishing 4th in the overall standings.

However, Russell would leave Glasgow in 2019 after one season behind the bench to take the coaching job with German DEL2 side EHC Freiburg.

Clan defenceman Zack Fitzgerald replaced Russell in May 2019 and took on his first coaching job in the process but, after a promising start to the season, including equalling a club-record eight consecutive wins, injuries took their toll and the form faded.

The 2019–20 EIHL season was then brought to a premature close in March 2020 due to the Coronavirus pandemic and Fitzgerald subsequently left his position as coach and director of hockey operations after just a year in charge in April, commencing Glasgow's fourth coaching search in as many years.

It was also announced in May 2020 that the Clan would commence a working relationship with Paisley Pirates to help sport in the west of Scotland. Both sides play out of Braehead Arena and it is hoped the partnership will provide Pirates players with a pathway to the Elite League. The Clan will also help Paisley's commercial and marketing teams.

=== 2021–2023, return to play and arena deal secured ===
After the cancellation of the 2020–21 Elite League season due to the Coronavirus pandemic, and amid uncertainty about the future of Braehead Arena following the collapse of the rink's owner/operator Intu Properties, Glasgow delayed naming a new head coach.

However, in July 2021, the Clan announced the appointment of experienced Canadian Malcolm Cameron as their new head coach and head of hockey operations.

The Clan then released a statement confirming their intention to begin the 2021-22 Elite League season later than the rest of the league in November 2021. The club confirmed they would withdraw from the Challenge Cup for the 2021–22 season and focus solely on their 54-game regular season and play-off push.

In November 2021, the Clan announced their leadership group for the 2021–22 season, with Canadian forward Dyson Stevenson taking the 'C', and former captain Matt Haywood wearing the 'A', alongside defencemen Cody Sol and Mikko Vainonen.

In the same month, the club also confirmed their subsidiary company Glasgow Arena Ltd had signed a 20-year lease to become the new operators of Braehead Arena, following lengthy negotiations with Global Mutual. The announcement ended months of uncertainty over the home of the Clan and the Paisley Pirates, who also use the rink.

Glasgow finished in 6th place in Cameron's first season in charge, losing their two-legged play-off quarter-final 5–4 on aggregate to eventual play-off champions the Cardiff Devils.

In September 2022, Glasgow named Mathieu Roy as captain, with Mitchell Jones and Nolan LaPorte as alternate captains. Craig Peacock and Shawn Boutin were also given the 'A' for home and away games respectively.

However, Glasgow endured a tough start to the 2022–23 season - failing to win any of their first 16 games in league and cup action, picking up just three combined points in the process.

Moreover, at the end of September, Clan announced the signing of alleged rapist, Lasse Uusivirta which caused uproar from fans. They released a video that acknowledged but also tried to dismiss these allegations. Due to this backlash, Clan undid the announcement.

The Clan then announced on 27 October that they had parted company with head coach Malcolm Cameron. Player/assistant coach Stephen Dixon was then placed in interim charge with fellow forward Dyson Stevenson.

Clan captain Mathieu Roy then left the club in December 2022, to pursue a 'long-term opportunity' back in North America. Peacock was then named captain for the remainder of the season, with Jones, John Dunbar and Steven McParland as assistant captains.

Remarkably, despite their poor start to the season, Glasgow did qualify for the 2022–23 end of season Elite League play-offs after finishing in 8th place on 35 points from 54 games (15–34–5) under the stewardship of interim coaches Dixon and Stevenson.

The Clan pipped rivals Fife Flyers to the final play-off position by just one point after the Flyers' final day loss to Guildford. However, Glasgow would narrowly exit at the quarter-final stage, losing 7–6 on aggregate to league and cup champions the Belfast Giants - despite winning the home leg 4–3.

=== 2023–24 season, Club takeover and new coach arrives ===
During the off-season, in May 2023, the club was sold to Michael O'Rourke of TDL Media.

Then, on 31 May 2023, Glasgow announced the appointment of former NHLer Jason Morgan as the club's new head coach and head of hockey operations. Morgan had most recently coached German side Heilbronner Falken, and previously had experience behind the bench in Poland, Hungary, Denmark and Romania.

The Clan reached the Challenge Cup semi-final for the fifth time after finishing 3rd in Group A. They defeated the Cardiff Devils 6–5 on aggregate in the quarter-finals but lost 6–3 on aggregate to the Guildford Flames.

Glasgow finished the 2023-24 Elite League season in last place for the first time in club history with 49 points, finishing the season with an 8–5 loss at home to the Cardiff Devils.

On 8 April 2024, the Clan announced that goaltending/assistant coach Jeff Battah opted to leave the club for Fehérvár Hockey Academy 19. A week later on 15 April 2024, Glasgow announced the departure of head coach Jason Morgan after just one season with the club, after they finished in last place for the first time in history.

=== 2024–2026, Neilson era ===
On the same day as Morgan's departure, Glasgow announced the arrival of EIHL legend and former Nottingham Panthers head coach Corey Neilson, who had been released from his former coaching role with Dresdner Eislöwen.

In February 2025, the Clan's managing director Gareth Chalmers confirmed he was stepping down after more than a decade in post. Chalmers was replaced as CEO and managing director by Russell Smith. On 27 January 2026, it was announced that Neilson and the Clan had mutually parted ways.

=== 2026-Present ===
Mike Sirant, previously Neilson's assistant, stepped in as head coach on an interim basis. Following Neilson's exit, the Clan went 12-9-4 (playoffs included), moved 26 points clear of the Dundee Stars, and finished only two wins outside the top six, as well as recording their joint best EIHL Playoffs result, finishing 3rd. The Clan parted ways with Sirant on the 12th of October 2026 after 7 straight losses to start the league season.On the 26th of October 2026 the Clan announced Jack Skille as the new head coach.

== Elite Ice Hockey League record ==
Season	League		Conference		Playoff	Challenge Cup
2010–11	EIHL	5th			QF	Group
2011–12	EIHL	6th			QF	SF
2012–13	EIHL	8th	Gardiner	1st	QF	SF
2013–14	EIHL	5th	Gardiner	4th	3rd	QF
2014–15	EIHL	2nd	Gardiner	1st	QF	QF
2015–16	EIHL	3rd	Gardiner	1st	QF	QF
2016–17	EIHL	5th	Gardiner	1st	QF	QF
2017–18	EIHL	9th	Gardiner	2nd		Group
2018–19	EIHL	4th	Gardiner	1st	QF	SF
2019–20^{†}	EIHL	7th				SF
2020–21^{††}	EIHL	Cancelled			Cancelled	Cancelled
2021–22	EIHL	6th			QF	DNP^{†††}
2022–23	EIHL	8th			QF	Group
2023–24	EIHL	10th				SF
2024–25	EIHL	7th			QF	Elimination Game
2025–26	EIHL	8th			3rd	Elimination Game

^{†} Note the 2019–20 Elite League season finished after 48 games for Glasgow, and the EIHL campaign finished without a league or play-off winner, due to the Coronavirus pandemic. The above stat line reflects the Clan's position at the time of the cancellation of the season.

^{††} Note the 2020–21 Elite League season - originally scheduled for a revised start date of 5 December - was suspended on 15 September 2020, because of ongoing coronavirus pandemic restrictions. The EIHL board determined that the season was non-viable without supporters being permitted to attend matches and unanimously agreed to a suspension. The season was cancelled completely in February 2021.

^{†††} Due to Glasgow's arena situation, they began the 2021–22 Elite League season in November 2021, rather than September. As a result, the team withdrew from the Challenge Cup.

=== Honours ===
EIHL Gardiner Conference champions (5)

- 2012–13, 2014–15, 2015–16, 2016–17, 2018–19

Individual

- EIHL All-Stars

First Team Elite Prospects - Award - EIHL All-Star First Team

- 2011–12 Jade Galbraith

Second Team Elite Prospects - Award - EIHL All-Star Second Team

- 2012–13 Ashley Goldie
- 2014–15 Kyle Jones, Scott Aarssen, Stefan Meyer, Leigh Salters
- 2016–17 Scott Pitt, Matt Beca
- 2021–22 Mathieu Roy
- 2023–24 Gary Haden

== Head coach history ==
Name	Nationality	Tenure
Bruce Richardson	(Canada)	2010–11
Drew Bannister	(Canada)	2011–12
Jordan Krestanovich	(Canada)	2012–13
Paul Gardner	(Canada)	2013
Ryan Finnerty	(Canada)	2013–17
John Tripp	(Canada) (Germany)	2017–18
Pete Russell	(Scotland)	2018–19
Zack Fitzgerald	(United States)	2019–20
Malcolm Cameron	(Canada)	2021–22
Jason Morgan	(Canada)	2023–24
Corey Neilson	(Canada) (United Kingdom)	2024–26
Mike Sirant	(Canada)	2026
Jack Skille	(United States)	2026–Present

== Current roster ==
Squad for 2026-27 Elite Ice Hockey League season

- * Denotes two-way deal with Paisley Pirates of the SNL
- ** Denotes two-way deal with Peterborough Phantoms of the NIHL
- *** Denotes two-way deal with Solway IHC of the NIHL

Netminders
No.		Player	Catches	Acquired	Place of Birth	Joined from	Press Release
29	(Scotland)	Caiden MacColl*	Unknown	2026	Scotland	Paisley Pirates, SNL
31	(England)	Daniel Norton	L	2026	Doncaster, England	Leeds Knights, NIHL
32	(Finland)	Rasmus Tirronen	L	2026	Espoo, Finland	Steinbach Black Wings Linz, IceHL
70	(Canada)	Liam Soulière	L	2026	Brampton, Canada	Toledo Walleye, ECHL

Defencemen
No.		Player	Shoots	Acquired	Place of Birth	Joined from	Press Release
3	(United States)	Jake Johnson	L	2026	Bloomington, United States	Cincinnati Cyclones, ECHL
24	(Canada)	Matt Spencer A	R	2026	Guelph, Canada	Nottingham Panthers, EIHL
43	(Finland)	Miihkali Teppo	L	2025	Helsinki, Finland	Sparta Sarpsborg, EHL
44	(Finland)	Julius Reini	L	2026	Genk, Belgium	Pioneers Vorarlberg, IceHL
49	(Canada)	Steven Seigo A	R	2024	Edenwold, Canada	EC Kassel Huskies, DEL2
77	(Finland)	Juho Rautanen	L	2026	Mäntsälä, Finland	Brûleurs de Loups, Ligue Magnus
91	(United States)	Keaton Pehrson	R	2026	Lakeville, United States	Savannah Ghost Pirates, ECHL
TBC	(England)	Billy Thorpe**	R	2026	Peterborough, England	Peterborough Phantoms, NIHL

Forwards
No.		Player	Position	Acquired	Place of Birth	Joined from	Press Release
7	(England) (United Kingdom)	Robert Lachowicz	LW/C	2023	Nottingham, England	Guildford Flames, EIHL
9	(Canada)	Brady Risk	RW/LW	2025	Medicine Hat, Canada	IF Troja-Ljungby, HockeyAllsvenskan
10	(United States)	Mick Messner	C/W	2026	Madison, United States	HC MONACObet Banská Bystrica, Slovak Extraliga
11	(England)	Austin Mitchell-King	LW	2025	Warwick, England	Peterborough Phantoms, NIHL
19	(Canada)	Ross Armour	C/RW	2026	Trail, Canada	Nottingham Panthers, EIHL
21	(Scotland)	Torran Anderson***	F	2026	Kilmarnock, Scotland	Solway IHC, NIHL
23	(Canada)	Tristin Langan A	C/LW	2025	Swan River, Canada	Stavanger Oilers, EHL
55	(United States)	Chris Dodero	C/LW	2026	West Chicago, United States	Wheeling Nailers, ECHL
57	(Scotland)	Alex Forbes	RW/D	2023	Elgin, Scotland	Coventry Blaze, EIHL
67	(United States)	Cole Kodsi	LW	2026	Boca Raton, United States	Orlando Solar Bears, ECHL
82	(Denmark)	David Madsen	C/RW	2026	Vojens, Denmark	Västerås IK, HockeyAllsvenskan
89	(Canada)	Josh Tarzwell	C	2026	Red Deer, Canada	Mount Royal Cougars, U Sports
94	(United States) (United Kingdom) (Canada)	Cade Neilson	C	2025	Lafayette, United States	Utah Grizzlies, ECHL
95	(Canada)	Deven Sideroff C	C/RW	2024	Summerland, Canada	Rytíři Kladno, Czech Extraliga

Team Staff
No.		Name	Position	Place of Birth	Joined from	Press Release
N/A	(United States)	Jack Skille	Head coach	Madison, United States	Appointed in 2026
N/A	(Scotland)	Adam Walker	Assistant Coach	Kirkcaldy, Scotland	Appointed in 2026
N/A	(United States)	Steve Birnstill	Assistant Coach	Commack, United States	Appointed in 2026
7	(England) (United Kingdom)	Robert Lachowicz	Player/Assistant Coach	Nottingham, England	Guildford Flames, EIHL
N/A	(Germany)	Fabian Dahlem	Goaltender Coach / Team Consultant	Rosenheim, Germany	Appointed in 2025
N/A	(Scotland)	Paul Heavey	Director of Player Development	Glasgow, Scotland	Appointed in 2024
N/A	(Scotland)	Sam Harrison	Equipment Manager	Scotland	Appointed in 2025
N/A	(Scotland)	Kirsty Rodgers	Physiotherapist	Scotland	Appointed in 2021
N/A	(Scotland)	Russell Smith	Chief Executive Officer	Scotland	Appointed in 2025
N/A	(Canada)	Aaron Murphy	Senior Advisor of Hockey & Broadcast Operations	Canada	Appointed in 2023
N/A	(Scotland)	Gerry McLaughlin	Commercial Director	Scotland	Appointed in 2018
N/A	(Canada)	Zach Vinnell	Director of hockey operations	Cochrane, Canada	Appointed in 2026

== Recent departures ==
No.		Name	Position	Acquired	Leaving For	Press Release
4	(Canada)	Reece Harsch	D	2026	South Carolina Stingrays, ECHL
6	(United States)	Colton Poolman	D	2025	Retired
44	(England)	Lucas Brine	G	2024	Sheffield Steelers, EIHL
68	(Canada)	Brett Neumann	C	2025	Guildford Flames, EIHL
71	(Canada) (Germany)	Rylan Schwartz	C	2024	TBC
73	(England)	Joseph Hazeldine	D	2024	Nottingham Panthers, EIHL
74	(Finland)	Sami Aittokallio	G	2025	TH Unia Oświęcim, Polska Hokej Liga
