= Jade Galbraith =

Canadian ice hockey player (born 1982)

- Born: March 2, 1982 (age 44) Hinton, Alberta, Canada
- Height: 5 ft 11 in (180 cm)
- Weight: 181 lb (82 kg; 12 st 13 lb)
- Position: Right wing
- Shot: Right
- Played for: Atlantic City Boardwalk Bullies; Florence Pride; Dayton Bombers; Cincinnati Cyclones; Pensacola Ice Pilots; Louisiana IceGators; San Diego Gulls; Victoria Salmon Kings; SC Riessersee; Füchse Duisburg; EHC München; Nottingham Panthers; Braehead Clan; Heerenveen Flyers; Bentley Generals; Adelaide Adrenaline
- NHL draft: Undrafted
- Playing career: 2002–2015

Jade Galbraith (born March 2, 1982) is a Canadian professional ice hockey player who is head coach, and currently playing with, the Adelaide Adrenaline of the Australian Ice Hockey League.

== Junior career ==
Galbraith played junior hockey at Drayton Valley Thunder before leaving for the NCAA and the University of Alaska, where he iced just 3 times.

== ECHL ==
After one season in the WHL with the Saskatoon Blades in 2000/01, Jade went on to ply his trade mainly in the ECHL.

Galbraith's ECHL clubs were to include Florence Pride, Dayton Bombers, Cincinnati Cyclones, Louisiana IceGators, Victoria Salmon Kings and the San Diego Gulls. Galbraith also spent two seasons at the Pensacola Ice Pilots in Florida (2003/04 and 2004/05) where he played alongside defenceman Corey Neilson, with whom he partnered again later in his career.

== Germany ==
The 2006 season saw Galbraith embark on a European venture as he joined SC Riessersee in Garmisch-Partenkirchen in the German minor leagues. The following season saw him remain in Germany, signing for EHC München (Munich) in the German second tier, before eventually moving to Füchse Duisburg in the top tier of German hockey, the Deutsche Eishockey Liga. However, he played just six games for the team.

== United Kingdom ==
At the start of the 2008 season, Galbraith's old teammate at Pensacola, Corey Neilson had taken over as Player/head coach at the Nottingham Panthers in the UK's Elite Ice Hockey League and Neilson persuaded Galbraith to join the Panthers for the 2008/09 season. Galbraith quickly became a point of discussion for the league and Nottingham fans debated long and hard about his undoubted talent, whilst questioning his attitude as it was evident that he had arrived in Nottingham in not the best of physical condition. Galbraith wore the number 40 in his first season in the UK

Galbraith was announced by the Panthers as their last import signing for the 2009/10 season and switched to wear the number 13 jersey. In a contrast to the previous season, Galbraith was playing in much better shape after losing 37 lbs during the off-season. He went on to have a stand out season scoring 77 points including 57 assists and was included in the Elite league All Star line up. The Panthers experienced some success in 2009/10, winning the Challenge cup and reaching the final four after a 3rd-place finish in the league.

On the 8th April 2010, only 5 days after the playoffs finished, the Panthers announced the re-signing of Galbraith for a 3rd season in Nottingham where he bettered his points performance from the previous season, scoring 85 points including 62 assists. The Panthers went on to retain the Challenge Cup as well as claim the Playoff Championship.

On 5 August 2011, Galbraith signed for the Braehead Clan and was made alternate captain. In the 2011-12 season, Galbraith scored 38 goals and 57 assists for 95 points and was named the league's Player of the Year. He also earned a place on the EIHL All-Star First Team. Galbraith re-signed with the Clan on 22 June 2012 and was also made an assistant coach to Clan head coach Jordan Krestanovich. His scoring numbers however sharply declined, managing just 41 points in 44 games, marking the first time he averaged less than a point a game in the EIHL.

== Later years ==
On August 14, 2013, the Arizona Sundogs of the Central Hockey League announced the signing of Galbraith for the 2013-14 season However, he left the team three months later without ever playing for the team and moved to The Netherlands and signed for the Heerenveen Flyers in the Eredivisie. Following the 2013-14 season, Galbraith signed with the Dundee Stars of the EIHL but was eventually unable to join the team however because of visa problems. He eventually spent the season in the Chinook Hockey League with the Bentley Generals. It was Galbraith's final season as a player and though he never officially retired, he has remained a free agent since.

In 2022, he launched a podcast with Scottish ice hockey writer Craig Anderson, called The Galbraith Report, where he discussed his career and other issues in ice hockey.

On March 18, 2025, the Adelaide Adrenaline of the Australian Ice Hockey League announced that Galbraith would be taking over duties as their head coach.

On April 24, 2025, the Adrenaline announced that Galbraith would also be joining the active roster as a player for the 2025 season.

== Awards and honours ==
Award	Year
EIHL First All-Star team	2011–12
