= Jordan Krestanovich =

Canadian ice hockey player (born 1981)

- Born: June 14, 1981 (age 44) Langley, British Columbia, Canada
- Height: 6 ft 1 in (185 cm)
- Weight: 170 lb (77 kg; 12 st 2 lb)
- Position: Left wing
- Shot: Left
- Played for: Colorado Avalanche; Mora IK; Bolzano HC; SG Cortina; BK Mladá Boleslav; Braehead Clan
- NHL draft: 152nd overall, 1999; Colorado Avalanche
- Playing career: 2001–2013

Jordan Krestanovich (born June 14, 1981) is a Canadian former professional ice hockey player who served as a player-head coach for the Braehead Clan in the British Elite Ice Hockey League. He played in the National Hockey League (NHL) with the Colorado Avalanche.

== Playing career ==
As a youth, Krestanovich played in the 1994 Quebec International Pee-Wee Hockey Tournament with a minor ice hockey team from Surrey, British Columbia.

Krestanovich was drafted by the Colorado Avalanche in the fifth round, 152nd overall in the 1999 NHL entry draft. Jordan played junior hockey with the Calgary Hitmen of the Western Hockey League, winning the President's Cup in 1999, prior to being drafted.

He turned pro in 2001, spending several years with the Avalanche's American Hockey League affiliate, the Hershey Bears with brief appearances for the Avalanche in 2001–02 and 2003–04.

On March 8, 2004, Krestanovich was traded from the Avalanche to the Minnesota Wild for Chris Bala, only to play with the Wild's AHL affiliate, the Houston Aeros.

A free agent, Krestanovich signed with the Pensacola Ice Pilots of the ECHL for the 2004–05 season before spending the following year overseas with Mora IK of the Elitserien and Bolzano HC of the Italian Serie-A. In 2006–07, Jordan returned to the Ice Pilots of the ECHL before he was traded to become the captain of the Victoria Salmon Kings.

On August 6, 2008, Krestanovich left again for the Italian Hockey League signing with SG Cortina. After finishing second on Cortina with 37 points in the 2009–10 season Krestanovich was signed to a one-year contract by Czech team BK Mladá Boleslav of the Czech Extraliga on June 25, 2010.

On 4 November 2010, Krestanovich was signed as a free agent by former team-mate Bruce Richardson to a one-year contract with Scottish team Braehead Clan of the Elite Ice Hockey League. On 23 May 2011 Krestanovich re-signed with the Braehead Clan for the 2011/12 season. He was made captain with Jade Galbraith and Tim Wedderburn as his alternates.

On June 15, 2012, the Braehead Clan announced that Krestanovich had been appointed as the new player/coach following the departure of Drew Bannister.

== Career statistics ==
			Regular season					Playoffs
Season	Team	League	GP	G	A	Pts	PIM	GP	G	A	Pts	PIM
1997–98	Calgary Hitmen	WHL	22	1	0	1	0	13	0	0	0	0
1998–99	Calgary Hitmen	WHL	62	6	13	19	10	20	3	8	11	4
1999–00	Calgary Hitmen	WHL	72	19	24	43	22	13	7	7	14	4
1999–00	Hershey Bears	AHL	—	—	—	—	—	1	0	0	0	0
2000–01	Calgary Hitmen	WHL	70	40	60	100	32	12	8	4	12	8
2000–01	Hershey Bears	AHL	—	—	—	—	—	2	0	0	0	0
2001–02	Hershey Bears	AHL	68	12	22	34	18	8	1	0	1	0
2001–02	Colorado Avalanche	NHL	8	0	2	2	0	—	—	—	—	—
2002–03	Hershey Bears	AHL	70	13	21	34	24	4	0	1	1	2
2003–04	Hershey Bears	AHL	38	4	15	19	11	—	—	—	—	—
2003–04	Colorado Avalanche	NHL	14	0	0	0	6	—	—	—	—	—
2003–04	Houston Aeros	AHL	12	2	1	3	0	2	0	0	0	0
2004–05	Pensacola Ice Pilots	ECHL	69	27	41	68	22	3	1	1	2	0
2005–06	Mora IK	SEL	18	0	1	1	2	—	—	—	—	—
2005–06	Bolzano HC	ITA	20	11	11	22	2	—	—	—	—	—
2006–07	Pensacola Ice Pilots	ECHL	14	3	5	8	18	—	—	—	—	—
2006–07	Victoria Salmon Kings	ECHL	54	12	25	37	14	6	1	6	7	2
2007–08	Victoria Salmon Kings	ECHL	70	13	52	65	20	5	0	1	1	2
2008–09	SG Cortina	ITA	42	17	35	52	8	4	1	0	1	0
2009–10	SG Cortina	ITA	40	15	22	37	12	—	—	—	—	—
2010–11	Braehead Clan	EIHL	43	16	34	50	44	2	1	1	2	0
2011–12	Braehead Clan	EIHL	50	29	40	69	20	2	0	2	2	0
2012–13	Braehead Clan	EIHL	52	14	30	44	24	2	0	4	4	2
NHL totals			22	0	2	2	6	—	—	—	—	—
