= Leigh Salters =

Canadian ice hockey player (born 1989)

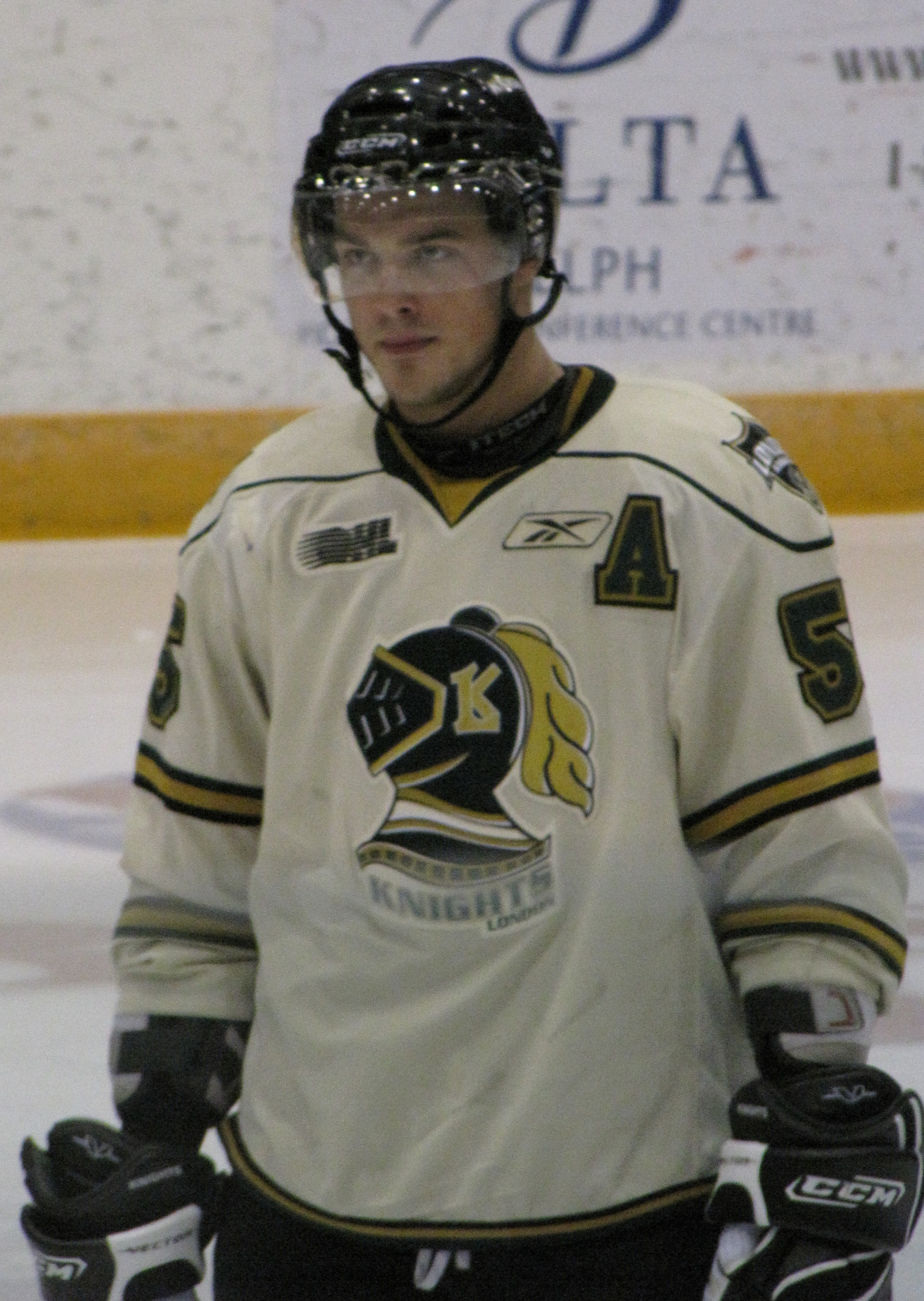
- Salters with the London Knights in 2010
- Born: March 27, 1989 (age 37) London, Ontario, Canada
- Height: 6 ft 4 in (193 cm)
- Weight: 225 lb (102 kg; 16 st 1 lb)
- Position: Left wing
- Shot: Left
- Played for: Worcester Sharks; Syracuse Crunch; Florida Everblades; Charlotte Checkers; Nottingham Panthers; Braehead Clan; Cardiff Devils
- NHL draft: Undrafted
- Playing career: 2010–2016

Leigh Salters (born March 27, 1989) is a Canadian former professional ice hockey player.

== Career ==
Prior to turning professional, Salters played five seasons in the Ontario Hockey League with the Guelph Storm and London Knights. featuring in 250 games, where he scored 34 goals and assisted on 50 others whilst being assessed 379 PIM

In the summer of 2010, San Jose Sharks invited Salters to their pre-season training camp, where he was assigned to their AHL team, Worcester Sharks before being traded to Syracuse Crunch in the AHL where he registered 3 points in 52 games and picked up 111 penalty minutes. He was assessed 17 fighting majors during the season trying to cement his position on the roster for next season.

At the end of the 2010-11 season, he was released and was subsequently signed by Florida Everblades in the ECHL on May 9, where he would spend the next two seasons, being called up to the Charlotte Checkers once.

Over the two seasons, he would play in 97 games, he would contribute 29 goals and 28 assists whilst picking up 188 penalty minutes. He fought 15 times over his two seasons in the ECHL,

On June 10, 2013, the Nottingham Panthers of the Elite Ice Hockey League announced the signing of Salters for the upcoming season. During his time in England, Salters picked up the Nottingham Panthers Supporters Club Player of the Month award for September along with Most Entertaining Player of the Season. He played in 58 games and scored 26 goals and 33 assists whilst picking up 124 penalty minutes.

For the start of the 2014/15 season Salters signed with Glasgow-based club, the Braehead Clan. Wearing the number 24, Leigh established himself as one of the top hard-hitting forwards in the EIHL by picking up a total of 50 Penalty in Minutes during the month of October alone. On January 17, 2015, Salters scored the 4th goal in a 6–2 win over Gardiner conference rivals Dundee Stars, which was the Braehead Clan's 1,000th goal in all EIHL competitions.

In the 2015-16 season, Salters moved to the Cardiff Devils.

== Career statistics ==
			Regular season					Playoffs
Season	Team	League	GP	G	A	Pts	PIM	GP	G	A	Pts	PIM
2005–06	Guelph Storm	OHL	49	2	6	8	60	13	0	0	0	10
2006–07	Guelph Storm	OHL	56	0	5	5	97	3	0	0	0	6
2007–08	Guelph Storm	OHL	59	10	11	21	92	8	0	0	0	6
2008–09	Guelph Storm	OHL	12	1	4	5	13	-	-	-	-	-
2008–09	London Knights	OHL	24	3	3	6	41	14	2	1	3	12
2009–10	London Knights	OHL	56	18	21	39	76	10	4	3	7	19
2010–11	Worcester Sharks	AHL	1	0	0	0	2	—	—	—	—	—
2010–11	Syracuse Crunch	AHL	52	1	2	3	111	—	—	—	—	—
2011–12	Florida Everblades	ECHL	44	14	11	25	110	13	4	0	4	29
2012–13	Florida Everblades	ECHL	53	15	17	32	78	7	1	3	4	2
2012–13	Charlotte Checkers	AHL	1	0	0	0	0	—	—	—	—	—
2013–14	Nottingham Panthers	EIHL	46	20	23	43	105	2	0	0	0	2
2014–15	Braehead Clan	EIHL	50	30	33	63	106	2	0	0	0	0
2015–16	Cardiff Devils	EIHL	44	15	17	32	82	2	0	1	1	0
OHL totals			250	34	50	84	379	48	6	4	10	53
ECHL totals			97	29	28	57	188	20	5	3	8	31
AHL totals			54	1	2	3	113	—	—	—	—	—
EIHL totals			140	65	73	138	293	6	0	1	1	2
