= Zack Fitzgerald =

American ice hockey player (born 1985)

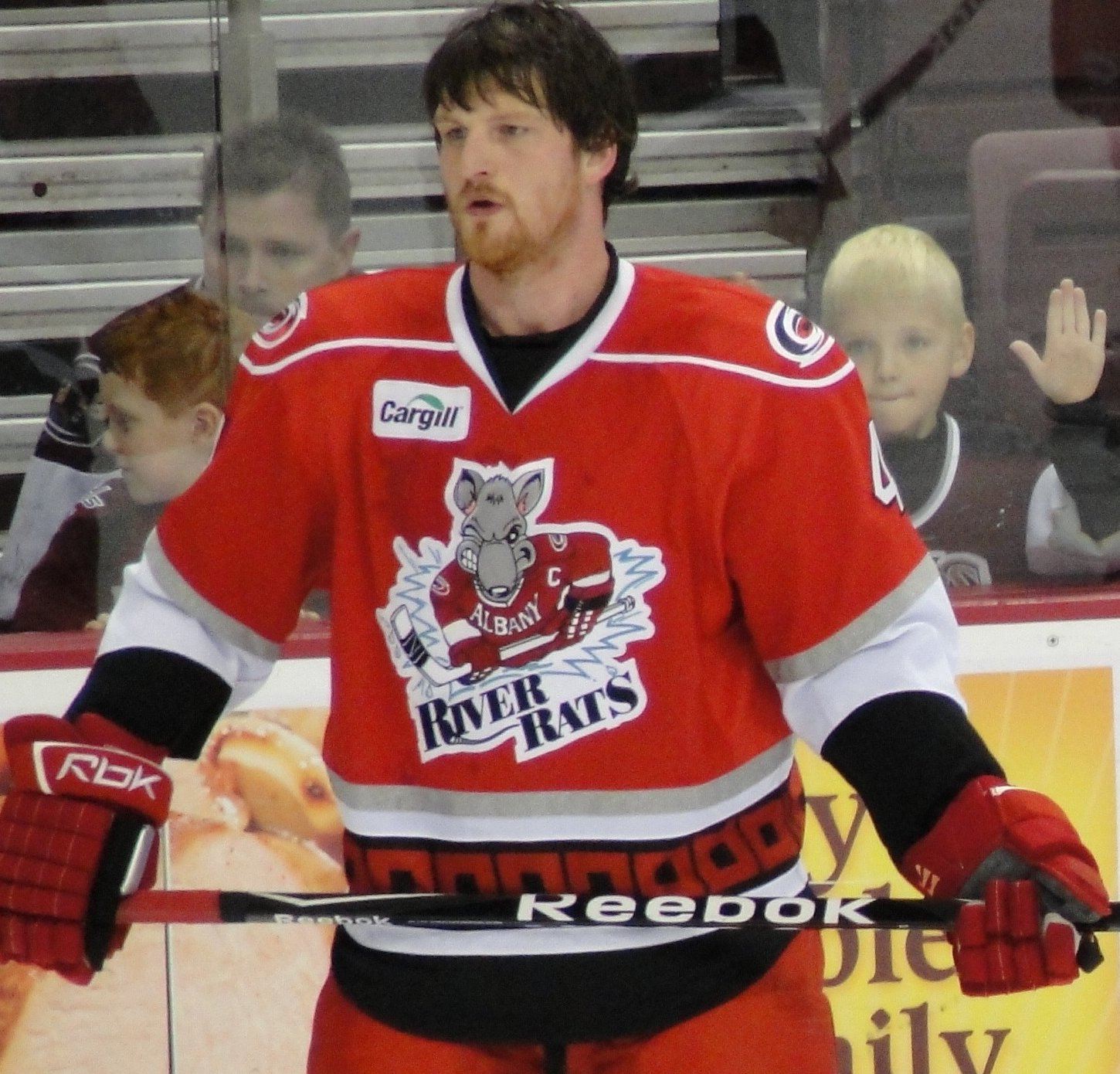
- Born: January 25, 1985 (age 41) Two Harbors, Minnesota, U.S.
- Height: 6 ft 2 in (188 cm)
- Weight: 214 lb (97 kg; 15 st 4 lb)
- Position: Defense
- Shot: Left
- Played for: Sheffield Steelers
- NHL draft: 88th overall, 2003; St. Louis Blues
- Playing career: 2005–2019

Zackary John Fitzgerald (born June 16, 1985) is an American former professional ice hockey player. He was most recently the head coach and director of hockey operations for the Glasgow Clan of the Elite Ice Hockey League (EIHL).

He played major junior hockey for the Seattle Thunderbirds in the Western Hockey League WHL, where he was drafted by the St. Louis Blues in the third round, 88th overall, in the 2003 NHL entry draft. Fitzgerald began his professional career in the Blues organization before he was traded to the Vancouver Canucks, ultimately playing his lone NHL game for the Canucks in 2007–08. He is mostly known as an enforcer. Fitzgerald was born in Two Harbors, Minnesota, but grew up in Duluth, Minnesota. He is the brother of Rusty Fitzgerald.

== Playing career ==
=== Juniors ===
Fitzgerald played for the Seattle Thunderbirds in the Western Hockey League (WHL) where he became a physical presence and learned the art of fighting. He stated "When I got into junior I didn't know anything about fighting and the doors just kind of opened to it. We had a pretty tough team and I always played physical when I was young so fighting just became a part of my game." Thanks to his willingness to drop the gloves, Fitzgerald led the Thunderbirds in penalty minutes twice during his four-year stay (he was second on the team in his other two years) and led the league with 244 penalty minutes for the 2004–05 season. Following the 2002–03 WHL season, in which Fitzgerald finished fourth in the league with 232 PIMs in 64 games, the St. Louis Blues drafted Fitzgerald in the 3rd round number 88 overall.

=== Professional ===
Fitzgerald made his professional debut for the Peoria Rivermen in the American Hockey League (AHL) in 2005–06, however, he split the season between Peoria and the Alaska Aces in the ECHL. He continued to play in both leagues the following season before he was traded to the Vancouver Canucks for Francois-Pierre Guenette in August 2007.

Thanks to a blue-line opening created by injuries and call-ups, Fitzgerald received more playing time with Vancouver's AHL affiliate the Manitoba Moose. The additional ice time allowed Fitzgerald to refine his game causing his then coach Scott Arniel to say "He's had an opportunity to play and play regularly and his game has been very good. He's been very responsible in our end of the rink, he's done a great job of making that first pass and you can see he has confidence because he's playing a lot. I think what he's trying to do is show people that he's more than just a fighter." Fitzgerald was also called up to the NHL during the 2007–08 season; he played one game for Vancouver against the Dallas Stars on February 5, 2008.

Following the 2008–09 season, Fitzgerald was not re-signed by the Canucks despite leading the Moose in PIMs, setting AHL career highs in assists and PIMs, being third on the team amongst defensemen at +13, and playing in 16 playoff games. On July 15, 2009 he signed as an unrestricted free agent with the Carolina Hurricanes. Fitzgerald attended Carolina's training camp but was assigned to their AHL affiliate the Albany River Rats. Fitzgerald set several career highs with the River Rats during the 2009–10 season including, games played (77), assists (12), points (14), and PIMs (311). His 311 PIMs lead the AHL. For the 2010–11 season Carolina changed AHL affiliates. As a member of the Charlotte Checkers Fitzgerald recorded 8 assists and led the team with 229 PIMs, which also ranked him ninth in the league. After two seasons in the Hurricanes system Fitzgerald left via free agency and signed a one-year deal with the AHL's Hamilton Bulldogs.

Fitzgerald signed with the Adirondack Phantoms on July 3, 2012.

On July 14, 2014, Fitzergald signed abroad on a one-year deal for a player/coach role with the Braehead Clan of the EIHL in Scotland.

After one season he moved to the Sheffield Steelers, where he was named an assistant captain. He remained with the Steelers for three seasons before returning to the Clan (now known as the Glasgow Clan) for the 2018–19 season, where he captained the team.

On May 30, 2019, Fitzgerald was named head coach and director of hockey operations for the Glasgow Clan, retiring him as a player in the process – although he did appear sporadically as injury cover throughout the season. He left his position at the end of the 2019-20 EIHL season.

== Career statistics ==
			Regular season					Playoffs
Season	Team	League	GP	G	A	Pts	PIM	GP	G	A	Pts	PIM
2000–01	East High School	HSMN	26	1	5	6	44	—	—	—	—	—
2001–02	Seattle Thunderbirds	WHL	61	3	7	10	214	10	0	2	2	19
2002–03	Seattle Thunderbirds	WHL	64	8	14	22	232	15	0	4	4	33
2003–04	Seattle Thunderbirds	WHL	58	4	15	19	163	—	—	—	—	—
2004–05	Seattle Thunderbirds	WHL	65	7	18	25	244	9	0	3	3	24
2005–06	Alaska Aces	ECHL	12	1	1	2	108	—	—	—	—	—
2005–06	Peoria Rivermen	AHL	13	1	1	2	47	—	—	—	—	—
2006–07	Peoria Rivermen	AHL	29	0	2	2	86	—	—	—	—	—
2006–07	Alaska Aces	ECHL	10	0	1	1	48	14	2	3	5	82
2007–08	Manitoba Moose	AHL	48	5	3	8	158	3	0	0	0	14
2007–08	Vancouver Canucks	NHL	1	0	0	0	0	—	—	—	—	—
2008–09	Manitoba Moose	AHL	56	0	8	8	209	16	0	1	1	14
2009–10	Albany River Rats	AHL	77	2	12	14	311	2	0	0	0	0
2010–11	Charlotte Checkers	AHL	76	0	8	8	229	10	0	1	1	32
2011–12	Hamilton Bulldogs	AHL	74	2	3	5	268	—	—	—	—	—
2012–13	Adirondack Phantoms	AHL	36	1	0	1	202	—	—	—	—	—
2013–14	Adirondack Phantoms	AHL	38	0	1	1	231	—	—	—	—	—
2014–15	Braehead Clan	EIHL	44	2	12	14	304	2	0	0	0	8
2015–16	Sheffield Steelers	EIHL	48	3	8	11	197	—	—	—	—	—
2016–17	Sheffield Steelers	EIHL	47	2	12	14	197	4	0	0	0	2
2017–18	Sheffield Steelers	EIHL	37	0	8	8	181	4	0	1	1	10
2018–19	Glasgow Clan	EIHL	56	4	13	17	178	2	0	0	0	4
2019–20	Glasgow Clan	EIHL	4	0	0	0	0	—	—	—	—	—
AHL totals			447	11	38	49	1741	31	0	2	2	60
NHL totals			1	0	0	0	0	—	—	—	—	—
EIHL totals			236	11	53	64	1057	12	0	1	1	24

== See also ==
- List of players who played only one game in the NHL
