= Jay Rosehill =

Canadian ice hockey player

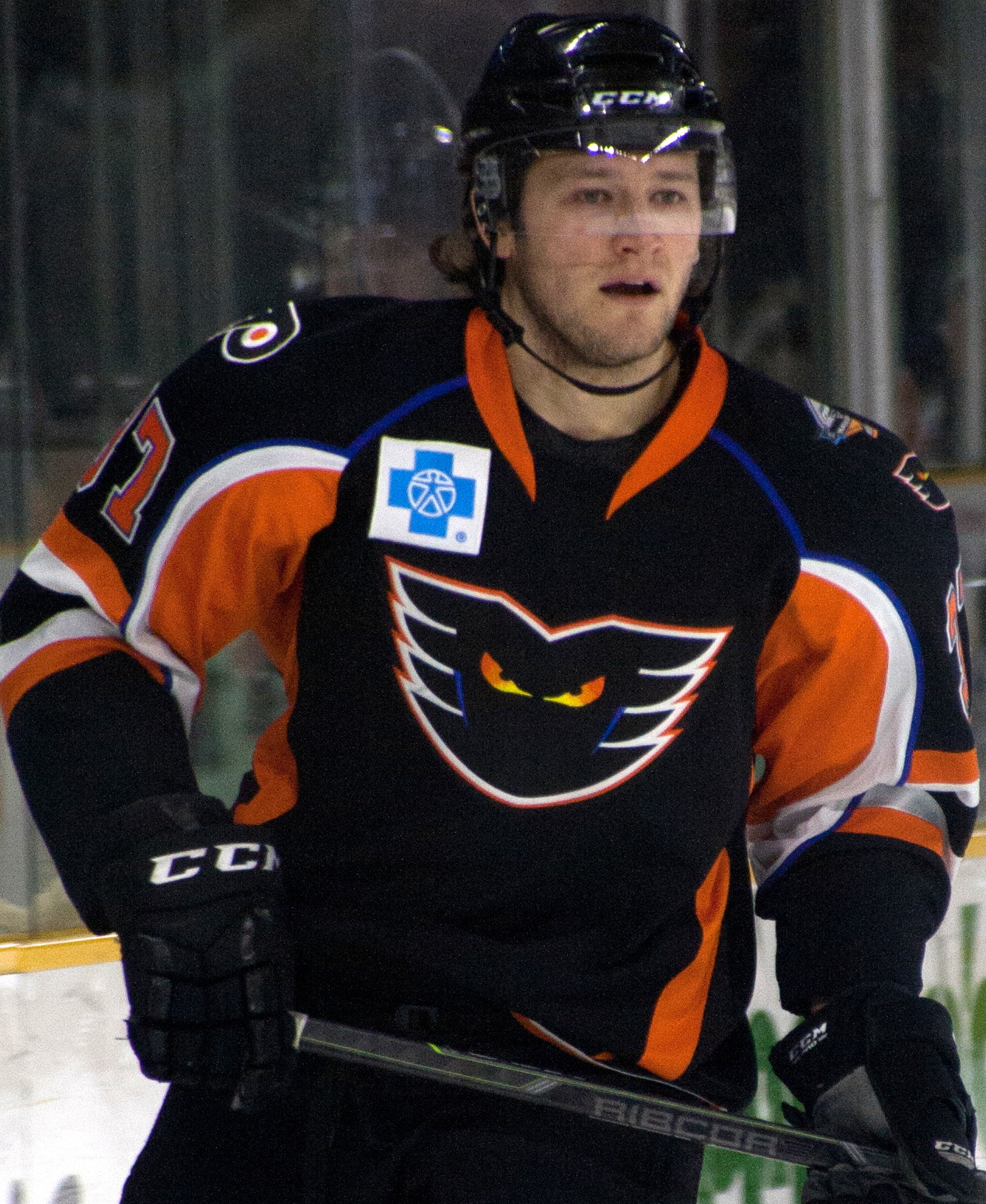
- Rosehill with the Lehigh Valley Phantoms in 2015
- Born: July 16, 1985 (age 41) Olds, Alberta, Canada
- Height: 6 ft 3 in (191 cm)
- Weight: 220 lb (100 kg; 15 st 10 lb)
- Position: Left wing
- Shot: Left
- Played for: Toronto Maple Leafs; Philadelphia Flyers
- NHL draft: 227th overall, 2003; Tampa Bay Lightning
- Playing career: 2005–2018

Jay Rosehill (born July 16, 1985) is a Canadian former professional ice hockey left winger who played for the Toronto Maple Leafs and the Philadelphia Flyers of the National Hockey League (NHL), and the Manchester Storm of the Elite Ice Hockey League (EIHL). Rosehill was mostly known as an enforcer in hockey. He was selected by the Tampa Bay Lightning in the 2003 NHL entry draft.

== Playing career ==
Rosehill was selected in the seventh round of the 2003 NHL Entry Draft (227th overall) by the Tampa Bay Lightning. He continued to play for the Olds Grizzlys of the AJHL in the 2003–04 season. The next season, he played for University of Minnesota Duluth of the Western Collegiate Hockey Association. For most of the next four seasons, he was placed in the Tampa Bay Lightning farm system, playing for both Johnstown Chiefs of the ECHL and the Springfield Falcons of the American Hockey League in 2005-06 and 2006–07. Due to new Tampa Bay farm system affiliations, he played for Mississippi Sea Wolves of the ECHL and the Norfolk Admirals of the American Hockey League in 2007-08 & 2008–09. On March 10, 2009, he was traded to the Toronto Maple Leafs organization for future considerations.

Rosehill started the 2009–10 NHL season on the starting roster for the Toronto Maple Leafs, and in his third game, he scored his first NHL goal against Marc-André Fleury of the Pittsburgh Penguins.

After joining the Norfolk Admirals on a try-out during the 2012–13 season, Rosehill was signed by NHL affiliate, the Anaheim Ducks, on a one-year contract on January 16, 2013. Rosehill was traded on April 1, 2013, to the Philadelphia Flyers in exchange for forward Harry Zolnierczyk. Two weeks later, Rosehill signed a two-year contract extension with the Flyers worth $1.35 million. The Flyers waived Rosehill at the beginning of the 2014–15 season. After he cleared waivers, the Flyers sent him to the Lehigh Valley Phantoms where he spent the entire season. An unrestricted free agent following the season, Rosehill signed a one-year AHL contract with Lehigh Valley.

In the summer of 2016, Rosehill moved to the UK's EIHL, signing for Braehead Clan. After one season with Braehead, Rosehill remained in the UK Elite League to follow Ryan Finnerty to Manchester Storm in May 2017.

== Career statistics ==
			Regular season					Playoffs
Season	Team	League	GP	G	A	Pts	PIM	GP	G	A	Pts	PIM
2001–02	Red Deer Chiefs AAA	AMHL	30	3	9	12	116	—	—	—	—	—
2002–03	Olds Grizzlys	AJHL	59	1	4	5	219	—	—	—	—	—
2003–04	Olds Grizzlys	AJHL	42	4	12	16	172	14	2	2	4	—
2004–05	University of Minnesota Duluth	WCHA	34	0	5	5	103	—	—	—	—	—
2005–06	Johnstown Chiefs	ECHL	5	0	0	0	13	5	0	0	0	4
2005–06	Springfield Falcons	AHL	45	1	1	2	68	—	—	—	—	—
2006–07	Springfield Falcons	AHL	64	0	6	6	85	—	—	—	—	—
2006–07	Johnstown Chiefs	ECHL	1	0	0	0	2	—	—	—	—	—
2007–08	Norfolk Admirals	AHL	66	3	4	7	194	—	—	—	—	—
2007–08	Mississippi Sea Wolves	ECHL	2	0	0	0	6	—	—	—	—	—
2008–09	Norfolk Admirals	AHL	57	5	7	12	221	—	—	—	—	—
2008–09	Toronto Marlies	AHL	13	2	1	3	54	6	0	0	0	4
2009–10	Toronto Marlies	AHL	46	1	2	3	172	—	—	—	—	—
2009–10	Toronto Maple Leafs	NHL	15	1	1	2	67	—	—	—	—	—
2010–11	Toronto Marlies	AHL	32	7	6	13	114	—	—	—	—	—
2010–11	Toronto Maple Leafs	NHL	26	1	2	3	71	—	—	—	—	—
2011–12	Toronto Maple Leafs	NHL	31	0	0	0	60	—	—	—	—	—
2011–12	Toronto Marlies	AHL	4	0	0	0	20	13	0	0	0	44
2012–13	Norfolk Admirals	AHL	33	4	4	8	90	—	—	—	—	—
2012–13	Philadelphia Flyers	NHL	11	1	0	1	64	—	—	—	—	—
2013–14	Philadelphia Flyers	NHL	34	2	0	2	90	—	—	—	—	—
2014–15	Lehigh Valley Phantoms	AHL	65	5	7	12	219	—	—	—	—	—
2015–16	Lehigh Valley Phantoms	AHL	23	1	2	3	33	—	—	—	—	—
2016–17	Braehead Clan	EIHL	40	4	18	22	140	2	0	0	0	8
2017–18	Manchester Storm	EIHL	42	6	11	17	186	2	0	0	0	2
AHL totals			448	29	40	69	1270	19	0	0	0	48
NHL totals			117	5	3	8	352	—	—	—	—	—
