= Lee Baldwin (ice hockey) =

Canadian ice hockey player

- Born: April 26, 1988 (age 38) Victoria, British Columbia, Canada
- Height: 6 ft 3 in (191 cm)
- Weight: 210 lb (95 kg; 15 st 0 lb)
- Position: Defence
- Shot: Left
- Played for: Connecticut Whale; Odense Bulldogs; ESV Kaufbeuren; Braehead Clan; Gamyo d'Épinal
- NHL draft: Undrafted
- Playing career: 2010–2018

Lee Baldwin (born April 26, 1988) is a Canadian former professional ice hockey player. He most notably played for the Connecticut Whale in the American Hockey League (AHL).

== Playing career ==
Undrafted, on March 22, 2010, Baldwin was signed as a free agent by the New York Rangers to a two-year entry-level contract. He was assigned to the Rangers affiliates, the Connecticut Whale of the American Hockey League and the Greenville Road Warriors of the ECHL for the duration of his contract.

On August 9, 2012, Baldwin was signed to a one-year ECHL contract to remain with the Greenville Road Warriors.

In the 2013–14 season, on December 13, 2013, Baldwin was traded by the Road Warriors to the Stockton Thunder in exchange for Brayden Irwin.

On May 27, 2014, Baldwin signed his first contract abroad, agreeing to a one-year contract with Danish club, Odense Bulldogs of the Metal Ligaen. In the 2014–15 season, Baldwin contributed with the Bulldogs to produce 22 points in 36 games, and featured in their brief post-season before suffering a first round elimination.

On June 23, 2015, Baldwin left Denmark for Germany, signing a one-year contract with second tier club, ESV Kaufbeuren of the DEL2.

Baldwin moved to the UK's EIHL to sign for Braehead Clan ahead of the 2016–17 season. In June 2017, Baldwin followed Braehead teammate, Corey Cowick, in signing for Ligue Magnus side Gamyo d'Épinal. He completed his eight-year professional career following the 2017–18 season.

== Career statistics ==
| | | | Regular season | | | | | Playoffs |
| Season | Team | League | GP | G | A | Pts | PIM | GP | G | A | Pts | PIM |
|---|---|---|---|---|---|---|---|---|---|---|---|---|
| 2004–05 | Nanaimo Clippers | BCHL | — | — | — | — | — | 1 | 0 | 0 | 0 | 0 |
| 2006–07 | Burnaby Express | BCHL | 59 | 0 | 16 | 16 | 55 | 14 | 2 | 3 | 5 | 6 |
| 2007–08 | Burnaby Express | BCHL | 35 | 7 | 17 | 24 | 40 | — | — | — | — | — |
| 2008–09 | Victoria Grizzlies | BCHL | 56 | 13 | 41 | 54 | 79 | 14 | 2 | 6 | 8 | 10 |
| 2009–10 | U. of Alaska-Anchorage | WCHA | 32 | 1 | 9 | 10 | 51 | — | — | — | — | — |
| 2009–10 | Hartford Wolf Pack | AHL | 7 | 1 | 0 | 1 | 4 | — | — | — | — | — |
| 2010–11 | Hartford Wolf Pack/CT Whale | AHL | 21 | 0 | 0 | 0 | 17 | — | — | — | — | — |
| 2010–11 | Greenville Road Warriors | ECHL | 27 | 2 | 8 | 10 | 15 | 10 | 0 | 1 | 1 | 4 |
| 2011–12 | Connecticut Whale | AHL | 17 | 0 | 0 | 0 | 2 | — | — | — | — | — |
| 2011–12 | Greenville Road Warriors | ECHL | 45 | 6 | 12 | 18 | 27 | 3 | 0 | 0 | 0 | 2 |
| 2012–13 | Greenville Road Warriors | ECHL | 59 | 4 | 16 | 20 | 42 | 5 | 0 | 1 | 1 | 6 |
| 2013–14 | Greenville Road Warriors | ECHL | 18 | 3 | 3 | 6 | 10 | — | — | — | — | — |
| 2013–14 | Stockton Thunder | ECHL | 48 | 4 | 14 | 18 | 41 | 6 | 0 | 2 | 2 | 4 |
| 2014–15 | Odense Bulldogs | DEN | 36 | 6 | 16 | 22 | 38 | 4 | 0 | 0 | 0 | 4 |
| 2015–16 | ESV Kaufbeuren | DEL2 | 52 | 7 | 22 | 29 | 58 | — | — | — | — | — |
| 2016–17 | Braehead Clan | EIHL | 52 | 2 | 12 | 14 | 10 | 2 | 0 | 0 | 0 | 0 |
| 2017–18 | Gamyo d'Épinal | FRA | 42 | 3 | 9 | 12 | 73 | — | — | — | — | — |
| AHL totals | | | 45 | 1 | 0 | 1 | 23 | — | — | — | — | — |

== Awards and honours ==
| Award | Year |
|---|---|
BCHL
| All-Star Team | 2009 |
| Most Points by Defenceman | 2009 |
