= Corey Neilson =

British-Canadian icehockey player (born 1976)

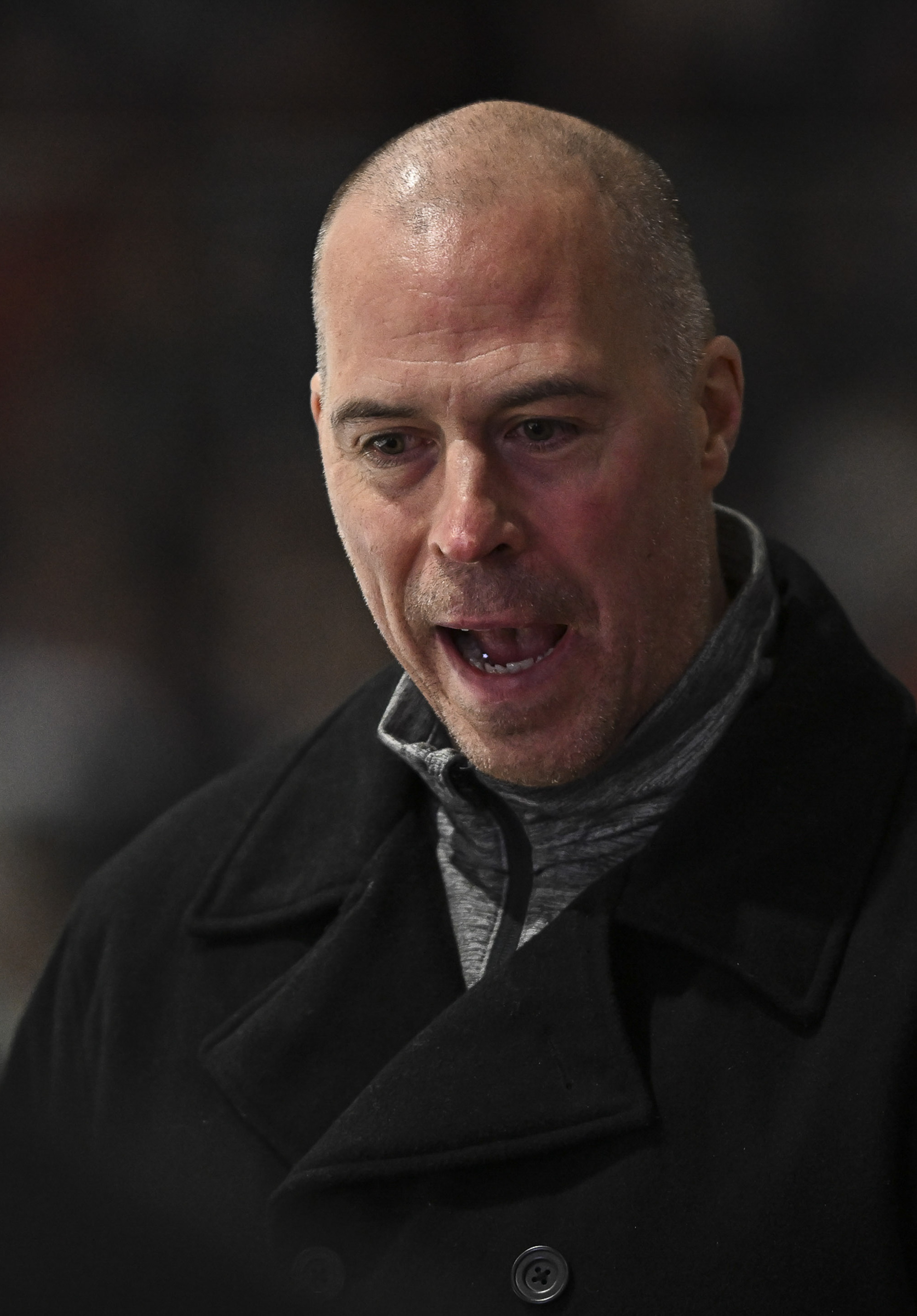
- Born: August 22, 1976 (age 49) Oromocto, New Brunswick, Canada
- Height: 6 ft 5 in (196 cm)
- Weight: 220 lb (100 kg; 15 st 10 lb)
- Position: Defence
- Shot: Right
- team: TBC
- Played for: Quad City Mallards; Portland Pirates; EC Timmendorfer Strand; Louisiana IceGators; Elmira Jackals; Syracuse Crunch; Pensacola Ice Pilots; Florida Everblades; Nottingham Panthers
- National team: Great Britain
- NHL draft: 53rd overall, 1994; Edmonton Oilers
- Playing career: 1997–2012

Corey Neilson (born August 22, 1976) is a Canadian born-British former professional ice hockey defenceman and most recently was the head coach of Scottish EIHL side the Glasgow Clan. Neilson was formerly the long-time head coach of the Nottingham Panthers of the British Elite Ice Hockey League from 2008 to 2018, later returning to Nottingham on an interim basis from 2022 to 2023.

Neilson was drafted 53rd overall in the 1994 NHL entry draft by the Edmonton Oilers and spent the next few years developing his game in the major junior Ontario Hockey League before turning professional in 1997. Neilson spent several seasons in the ECHL, getting called up to the American Hockey League before heading over to England to play for the Nottingham Panthers, where he played from 2006 when he was signed by then coach Mike Ellis as a player. He was later appointed player-coach in 2008 following a season as assistant player coach to Ellis.

Neilson continued to play and coach for the Panthers until he retired part way through the 2012–13 season, in which he later led the Nottingham Panthers to their first league title in 57 years and a grand slam season in 2012–13 (even though they only won 3 out of the 4 available trophies). Upon securing the league, the club retired Neilson's number 77 jersey alongside some of the Panthers legends of the past, Neilson became the 5th player to have his jersey retired by the club. In addition, under his leadership Panthers won six Challenge Cups and four Playoff championships, making him the most successful coach in Nottingham Panthers history.

Neilson also played for the Great Britain national ice hockey team after he obtained dual nationality. He is currently an assistant coach of the GB team - along with Adam Keefe - working under head coach Pete Russell.

In 2018, Neilson became the new head coach of German DEL2 side Lausitzer Füchse. He was relieved of his position in February 2021.

After a short spell coaching Norwegian side Manglerud Star Ishockey, Neilson was named the new head coach of Slovak Extraliga side HK Poprad in November 2021.

After leaving HK Poprad, Neilson was named as the new head coach of German DEL2 side EC Kassel Huskies on February 23, 2022 - replacing Tim Kehler.

In November 2022, Neilson returned to Nottingham as head coach on a deal until the end of the season. He departed the club in April 2023, after leading the team to the play-off semi-finals, to take a position elsewhere in Europe.

Ahead of the 2023–24 season, Neilson returned to Germany to take charge of DEL2 side Dresdner Eislowen.

At the end of the 2023–24 season, Neilson returned to the UK as the new head coach of EIHL club the Glasgow Clan on April 15, 2024, replacing Jason Morgan.

On the 27th of January 2026, it was announced that Neilson and the Clan had mutually parted ways.

== Awards and honours ==
Award	Year
EIHL First All-Star team	2011–12

== Career statistics ==
			Regular season					Playoffs
Season	Team	League	GP	G	A	Pts	PIM	GP	G	A	Pts	PIM
1999–00	Louisiana IceGators	ECHL	56	10	16	26	127	19	0	7	7	36
1999–00	Team Canada		2	0	0	0	0	—	—	—	—	—
2000–01	Louisiana IceGators	ECHL	64	15	25	40	128	14	2	10	12	24
2001–02	Louisiana IceGators	ECHL	71	12	40	52	138	5	1	4	5	8
2002–03	Elmira Jackals	UHL	72	10	44	54	136	8	1	4	5	26
2002–03	Syracuse Crunch	AHL	4	0	0	0	2	—	—	—	—	—
2003–04	Pensacola Ice Pilots	ECHL	72	19	59	78	130	5	0	3	3	6
2004–05	Pensacola Ice Pilots	ECHL	71	18	44	62	79	4	0	2	2	2
2005–06	Pensacola Ice Pilots	ECHL	32	6	19	25	77	—	—	—	—	—
2005–06	Florida Everblades	ECHL	40	7	16	23	54	5	2	5	7	18
2006–07	Nottingham Panthers	EIHL	54	11	31	42	111	4	1	1	2	12
2007–08	Nottingham Panthers	EIHL	54	13	36	49	144	2	0	1	1	0
2008–09	Nottingham Panthers	EIHL	54	15	47	62	123	4	1	4	5	10
2009–10	Nottingham Panthers	EIHL	54	13	44	57	106	3	0	2	2	6
2010–11	Nottingham Panthers	EIHL	54	9	47	56	90	4	1	2	3	8
2011–12	Nottingham Panthers	EIHL	53	8	42	50	94	4	0	2	2	4
2012–13	Nottingham Panthers	EIHL	7	0	5	5	12	—	—	—	—	—
EIHL totals			330	69	252	321	680	21	3	12	15	40
ECHL totals			406	87	219	306	773	52	5	31	36	94
