= Stefan Meyer (ice hockey) =

Canadian ice hockey player (born 1985)

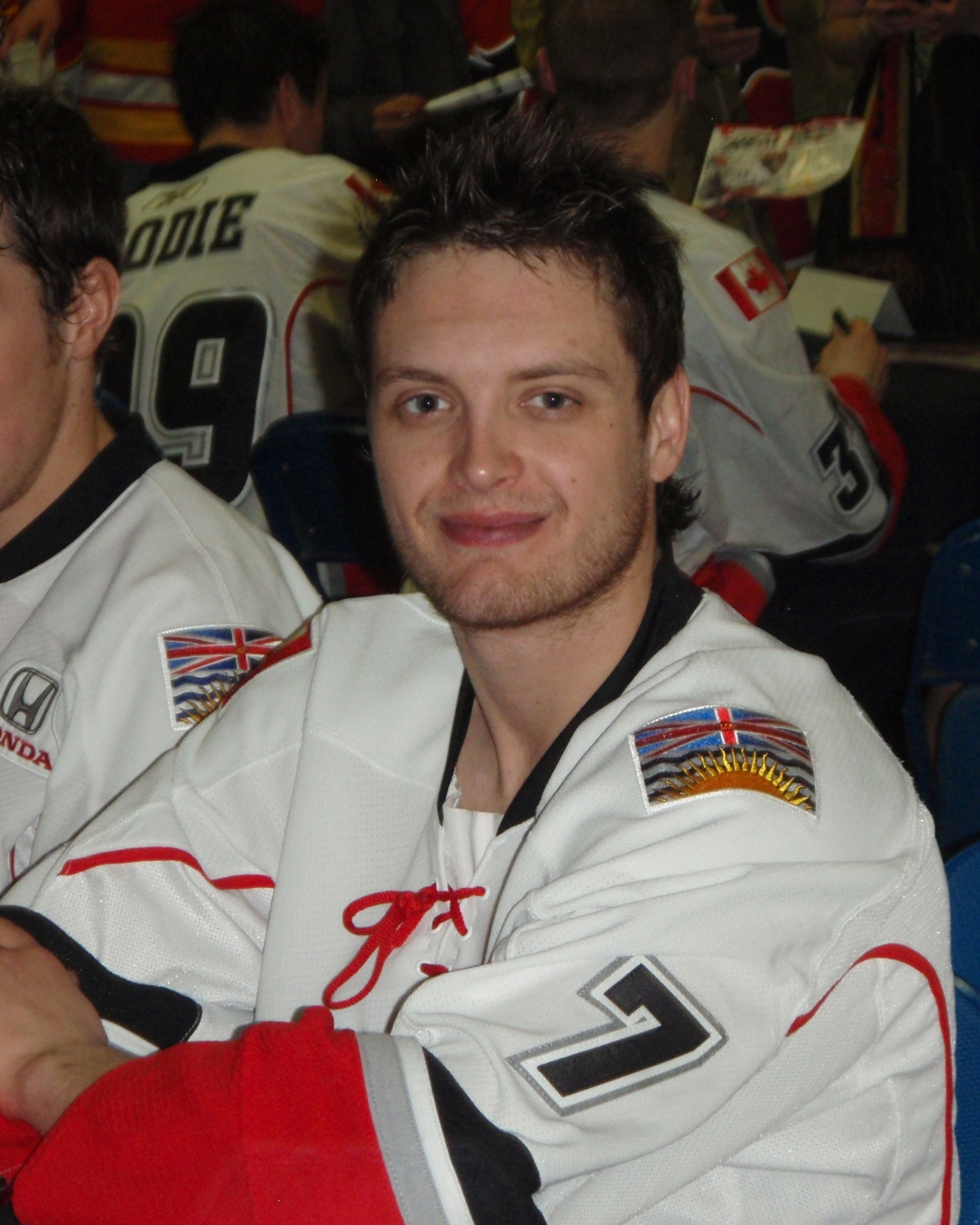
- Born: July 20, 1985 (age 41) Fox Valley, Saskatchewan, Canada
- Height: 6 ft 2 in (188 cm)
- Weight: 200 lb (91 kg; 14 st 4 lb)
- Position: Left wing
- Shot: Left
- Played for: Florida Panthers; Calgary Flames; Färjestad BK; Schwenninger Wild Wings; Sheffield Steelers; Braehead Clan
- NHL draft: 55th overall, 2003; Florida Panthers
- Playing career: 2005–2016

Stefan Meyer (born July 20, 1985) is a Canadian former professional ice hockey winger who played in the National Hockey League (NHL) with the Florida Panthers and Calgary Flames.

== Playing career ==
Meyer grew up in the small village of Fox Valley, Saskatchewan. He played his early years of minor hockey in the neighbouring community of Richmound, Saskatchewan. He was a noticeable talent throughout his minor hockey career in Richmound, where he played alongside future Medicine Hat Tigers teammate goaltender Matt Keetley.

Later, Meyer attended school in Wilcox, Saskatchewan, where he played for the Notre Dame Hounds at the Bantam AAA and Midget AAA levels. While attending school at Athol Murray College of Notre Dame, Meyer was roommates with current NHL Defenceman Braydon Coburn. The pair were drafted 1st and 2nd overall in the 2000 Western Hockey League Bantam Draft, with Braydon Coburn going first to the Portland Winter Hawks and Meyer second to the Medicine Hat Tigers.

Meyer starred for the Tigers during his WHL career and was a key contributor on their 2003-04 WHL championship team that eventually went on to lose in the Memorial Cup final to the host Kelowna Rockets squad.

Meyer was drafted 55th overall in the 2003 NHL entry draft by the Florida Panthers, and played his first NHL game in 2007. Meyer was traded to the Phoenix Coyotes for Steven Reinprecht on June 19, 2009.

Meyer signed a two-year contract with the Calgary Flames on July 20, 2010.

After playing only 6 games with the Calgary Flames AHL affiliate Abbotsford Heat during the 2011-12 season, Meyer was transferred to Farjestad BK Karlstad in the Swedish Elite League in December 2011. During the 2011-12 season, Meyer played 25 regular season games with Farjestad recording a goal and 6 assists. In the SEL playoffs, Meyer recorded 2 goals in 9 playoff games.

After Meyer's transfer to Farjestad, he continued playing in Europe. For the 2012-13 season, Meyer joined the Schwenninger Wild Wings of 2nd Bundesliga, the Tier 2 league in Germany. The following season, he moved to the Elite Ice Hockey League in the United Kingdom, joining the Sheffield Steelers and winning the league championship. In August 2014, Meyer announced that he would play the 2014-15 season for the Braehead Clan, the team the Steelers had beaten in the playoff quarterfinals the previous season.

Meyer has since started a family and retired from professional hockey, and is now a power skating instructor in Medicine Hat, Alberta.

== Career statistics ==
=== Regular season and playoffs ===
			Regular season					Playoffs
Season	Team	League	GP	G	A	Pts	PIM	GP	G	A	Pts	PIM
2000–01	Medicine Hat Tigers	WHL	4	1	1	2	0	—	—	—	—	—
2001–02	Medicine Hat Tigers	WHL	67	18	22	40	48	—	—	—	—	—
2002–03	Medicine Hat Tigers	WHL	70	36	16	52	90	11	3	3	6	14
2003–04	Medicine Hat Tigers	WHL	72	34	41	75	69	19	7	10	17	27
2004–05	Medicine Hat Tigers	WHL	69	34	43	77	104	13	2	4	6	8
2005–06	Rochester Americans	AHL	68	12	16	28	139	—	—	—	—	—
2006–07	Rochester Americans	AHL	63	13	9	22	90	6	0	2	2	8
2007–08	Rochester Americans	AHL	70	21	19	40	77	—	—	—	—	—
2007–08	Florida Panthers	NHL	4	0	0	0	0	—	—	—	—	—
2008–09	Rochester Americans	AHL	65	18	22	40	57	—	—	—	—	—
2009–10	San Antonio Rampage	AHL	67	10	8	18	86	—	—	—	—	—
2010–11	Calgary Flames	NHL	16	0	2	2	17	—	—	—	—	—
2010–11	Abbotsford Heat	AHL	42	12	5	17	50	—	—	—	—	—
2011–12	Abbotsford Heat	AHL	6	0	0	0	0	—	—	—	—	—
2011–12	Färjestad BK	SEL	25	1	6	7	40	9	2	0	2	2
2012–13	Schwenninger Wild Wings	GER.2	39	12	10	22	14	9	1	1	2	12
2013–14	Sheffield Steelers	EIHL	57	28	26	54	29	4	0	4	4	0
2014–15	Braehead Clan	EIHL	59	36	38	74	20	2	0	0	0	2
2015–16	Braehead Clan	EIHL	49	20	32	52	39	2	0	1	1	2
AHL totals			381	86	79	165	499	6	0	2	2	8
NHL totals			20	0	2	2	17	—	—	—	—	—
EIHL totals			144	74	86	160	84	8	0	5	5	4

=== International ===
Year	Team	Event	GP	G	A	Pts	PIM
2002	Canada Western	U17	5	4	5	9	4
2002	Canada	U18	5	1	3	4	4
Junior totals			10	5	8	13	8
