= Jeff Ulmer =

Canadian ice hockey player and coach

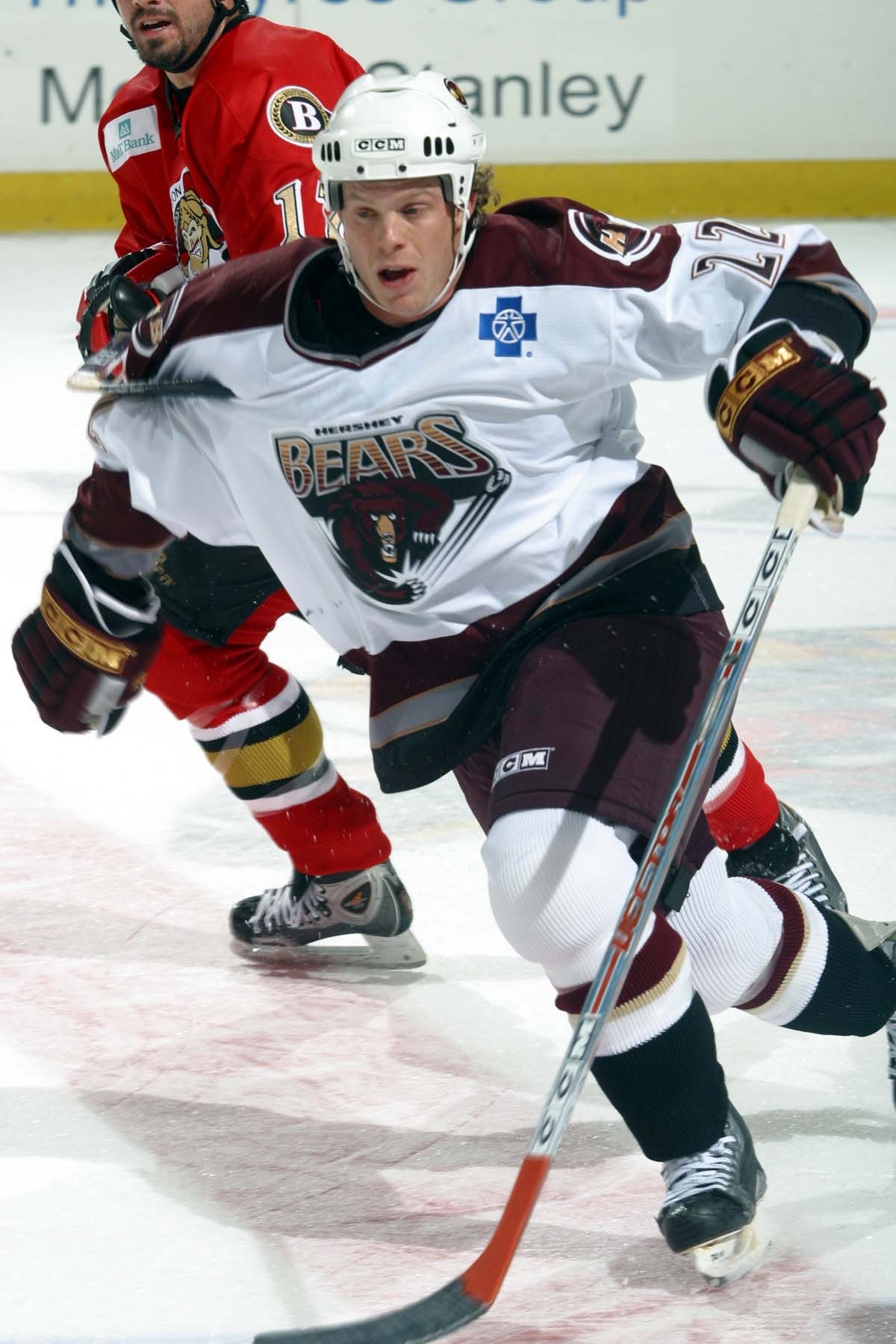
- Ulmer with the Hershey Bears in 2004
- Born: April 27, 1977 (age 48) Regina, Saskatchewan, Canada
- Height: 5 ft 11 in (180 cm)
- Weight: 195 lb (88 kg; 13 st 13 lb)
- Position: Right wing
- Shot: Right
- Played for: New York Rangers; Cardiff Devils; Lukko Rauma; Hamburg Freezers; Frankfurt Lions; Dinamo Minsk; HC Fribourg-Gottéron; MODO; Metallurg Novokuznetsk; Linköpings HC; DEG Metro Stars; Tappara; HDD Olimpija Ljubljana; HC TWK Innsbruck; Braehead Clan; Frederikshavn White Hawks; EHC Lustenau
- NHL draft: Undrafted
- Playing career: 1999–2018

Jeffrey Ulmer (born April 27, 1977) is a Canadian former professional ice hockey right winger. Jeff played professionally for 19 seasons. After retirement he worked for the Arizona Coyotes in the National Hockey League and the Abbotsford Canucks in the American Hockey League. He is currently an assistant coach for the San Jose Sharks in the National Hockey League. He played 21 games in the National Hockey League for the New York Rangers during the 2000–01 season and scored three goals. His brother Jason also played professionally for 16 seasons.

== Playing career ==
A product of the University of North Dakota, Ulmer turned pro in 1999, joining the Houston Aeros of the IHL. During the 2000–01 NHL season, he played 21 games for the New York Rangers, scoring three goals. Ulmer moved to Europe in 2003, splitting the 2003–04 campaign between the Cardiff Devils of the Elite Ice Hockey League in the United Kingdom and Lukko of the SM-liiga in Finland. He returned to North America in 2004, spending the season with the Hershey Bears of the American Hockey League before returning to Europe, moving to Germany's Deutsche Eishockey Liga (DEL) with the Hamburg Freezers.

After one season with Hamburg, he moved to fell DEL side Frankfurt Lions for a two-year spell. In 2008, he signed with HC Dinamo Minsk of the new Kontinental Hockey League and was later on 14 October 2008 loaned out for two months to Swiss HC Fribourg-Gottéron. On November 24, 2008, he signed with Modo Hockey of the Swedish Elitserien. On May 11, 2009, Ulmer rejoined the Frankfurt Lions. At the end of the 2009–10 season however, the Lions ceased operations due to increased financial difficulties. Ulmer signed with Metallurg Novokuznetsk in the KHL.

On December 6, Ulmer signed on with Linköpings HC of the Swedish Elitserien. On July 26, 2011, Ulmer announced he had returned to the German DEL with the DEG Metro Stars on a one-year contract. In 2012-13, he played in Finland (Tappara) and Switzerland (Lausanne HC).

Midway into the 2013–14 season, he transferred from HDD Olimpija Ljubljana to establish himself at fellow EBEL club, Innsbruck. Ulmer agreed to a one-year extension on January 23, 2014 and then in March 2015, he had his contract renewed for the 2015-16 season.

As a free agent the following year, Ulmer left the EBEL and signed a contract with Scottish club, Braehead Clan who play in the EIHL for the forthcoming 2016–17 season on July 19, 2016. Ulmer parted company with Braehead in October 2016 by mutual consent and joined the Frederikshavn White Hawks of Metal Ligaen in Denmark for a try-out a couple of days later. He signed a deal with the Frederikshavn outfit for the remainder of the 2016-17 season in early November. On March 3, 2017, in his first playoff game in 4 years, Ulmer made an assist and was Player of the Game in the White Hawks' 4-1 win over the Herning Blue Fox.

== Career statistics ==
=== Regular season and playoffs ===
			Regular season					Playoffs
Season	Team	League	GP	G	A	Pts	PIM	GP	G	A	Pts	PIM
1994–95	Notre Dame Hounds	SJHL	64	25	35	60	96	—	—	—	—	—
1995–96	University of North Dakota	WCHA	29	5	3	8	26	—	—	—	—	—
1996–97	University of North Dakota	WCHA	36	6	11	17	16	—	—	—	—	—
1997–98	University of North Dakota	WCHA	32	12	12	24	44	—	—	—	—	—
1998–99	University of North Dakota	WCHA	38	16	20	36	46	—	—	—	—	—
1999–00	Houston Aeros	IHL	5	1	0	1	0	11	2	4	6	6
1999–00	Canadian National Team	Intl	48	14	25	39	20	—	—	—	—	—
2000–01	New York Rangers	NHL	21	3	0	3	8	—	—	—	—	—
2000–01	Hartford Wolf Pack	AHL	48	11	14	25	34	—	—	—	—	—
2001–02	Grand Rapids Griffins	AHL	73	9	17	26	65	5	0	1	1	11
2002–03	Binghamton Senators	AHL	57	8	12	20	40	13	0	1	1	30
2003–04	Cardiff Devils	EIHL	9	9	9	18	6	—	—	—	—	—
2003–04	Lukko	FIN	34	13	8	21	67	4	0	0	0	2
2004–05	Hershey Bears	AHL	80	22	29	51	47	—	—	—	—	—
2005–06	Hamburg Freezers	DEL	51	23	15	38	73	6	2	4	6	18
2006–07	Frankfurt Lions	DEL	52	22	16	38	42	8	3	2	5	14
2007–08	Frankfurt Lions	DEL	55	20	33	53	65	12	4	6	10	14
2008–09	Dinamo Minsk	KHL	13	2	1	3	8	—	—	—	—	—
2008–09	Fribourg-Gottéron	NLA	12	1	3	4	2	—	—	—	—	—
2008–09	MODO	SWE	27	8	7	15	45	—	—	—	—	—
2009–10	Frankfurt Lions	DEL	56	37	37	74	22	4	2	0	2	2
2010–11	Metallurg Novokuznetsk	KHL	24	2	1	3	15	—	—	—	—	—
2010–11	Linköping HC	SWE	29	6	3	9	6	6	0	0	0	0
2011–12	DEG Metro Stars	DEL	52	12	20	32	32	7	2	2	4	10
2012–13	Tappara	FIN	6	2	3	5	4	—	—	—	—	—
2012–13	Lausanne HC	NLB	2	1	0	1	2	4	2	2	4	0
2013–14	Olimpija Ljubljana	EBEL	27	9	14	23	10	—	—	—	—	—
2013–14	HC Innsbruck	EBEL	26	13	7	20	14	4	2	2	4	0
2014–15	HC Innsbruck	EBEL	54	22	20	42	40	—	—	—	—	—
2015–16	HC Innsbruck	EBEL	54	21	16	37	38	—	—	—	—	—
2016–17	Braehead Clan	EIHL	6	1	4	5	0	—	—	—	—	—
2016–17	Frederikshavn White Hawks	DEN	34	15	14	29	14	15	5	6	11	12
2017–18	EHC Lustenau	ALP	27	14	19	33	12	—	—	—	—	—
AHL totals			258	50	72	122	186	18	0	2	2	41
DEL totals			266	114	121	235	234	37	13	14	27	58
NHL totals			21	3	0	3	8	—	—	—	—	—
