= Daniel Åhsberg =

Swedish ice hockey player

- Born: April 14, 1985 (age 40) Gothenburg, Sweden
- Height: 6 ft 0 in (183 cm)
- Weight: 183 lb (83 kg; 13 st 1 lb)
- Position: Left wing
- Shoots: Left
- team Former teams: Free agent Elitserien; Frölunda HC; Växjö Lakers Hockey; HockeyAllsvenskan; Rögle BK; IK Oskarshamn; Örebro HK; Tingsryds AIF; HC Vita Hästen; Gislaveds SK; Ligue Magnus; Ducs de Dijon; GET-ligaen; Lillehammer IK; EIHL; Braehead Clan; Hockeyettan; Helsingborgs HC
- NHL draft: Undrafted
- Playing career: 2001–present

Daniel Åhsberg (born 14 April 1985) is a Swedish professional ice hockey player who is currently a free agent. He previously played for Helsingborgs HC in the Swedish Hockeyettan.

In Sweden's top tier league Elitserien (SEL), Åhsberg has played for Frölunda HC and most recently for Växjö Lakers Hockey. Still awaiting his first point after twelve SEL games, he left the Lakers on 28 November 2011 and signed a one-season contract with Örebro HK of the Swedish HockeyAllsvenskan (Swe-1).

On 20 May 2016 Åhsberg signed for Scottish club Braehead Clan, of the Elite Ice Hockey League. After a season in the UK, Åhsberg returned to Sweden to sign for Helsingborgs HC.
