= Matt Keith =

Canadian ice hockey player

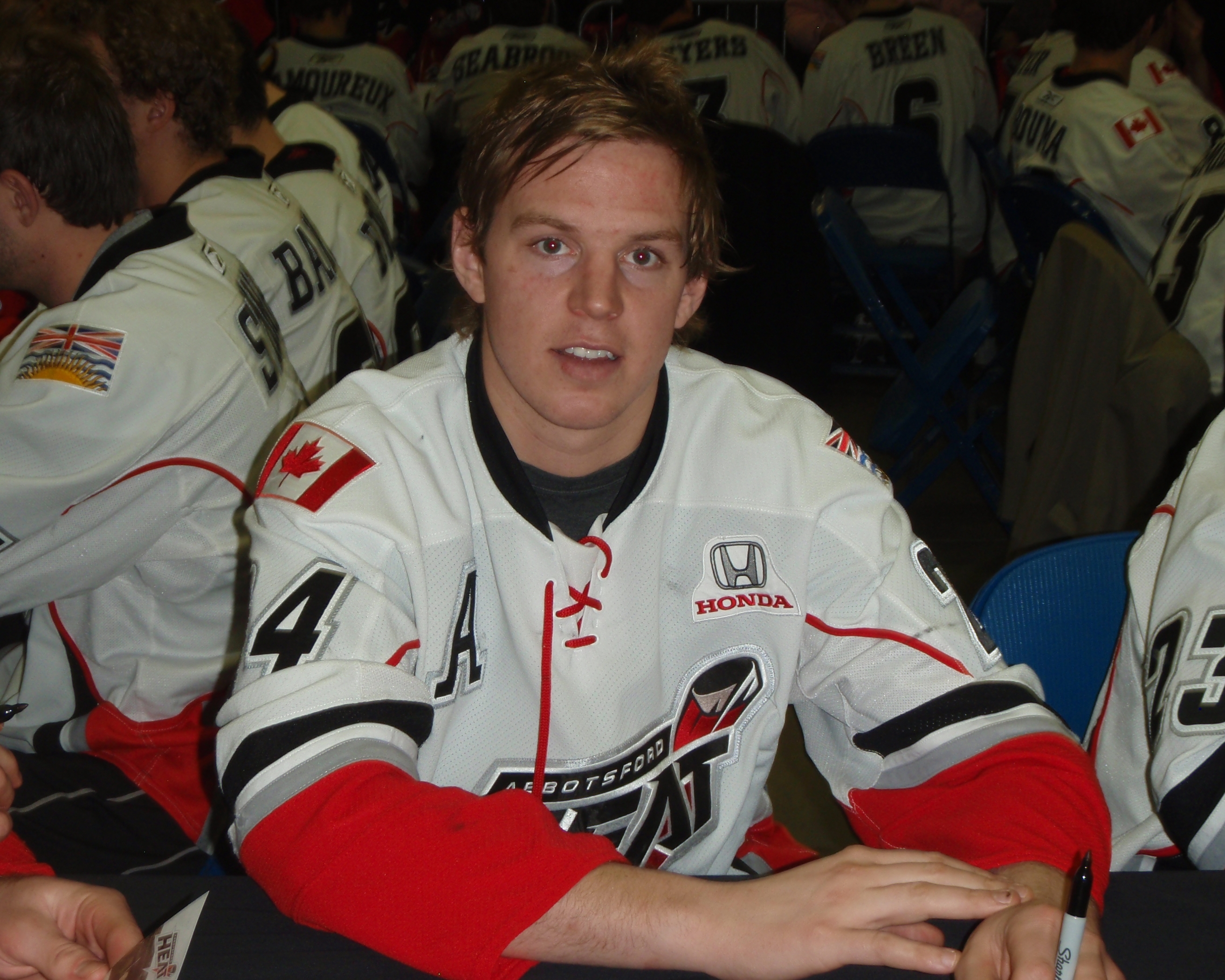
- Born: April 11, 1983 (age 43) Edmonton, Alberta, Canada
- Height: 6 ft 2 in (188 cm)
- Weight: 200 lb (91 kg; 14 st 4 lb)
- Position: Centre
- Shot: Right
- Played for: Chicago Blackhawks; New York Islanders; ERC Ingolstadt; Örebro HK; HC Karlovy Vary; Dornbirner EC; EC Red Bull Salzburg; Braehead Clan
- NHL draft: 59th overall, 2001; Chicago Blackhawks
- Playing career: 2003–2017

Matt Keith (born April 11, 1983) is a Canadian former professional ice hockey forward who last played and captained Braehead Clan of the Elite Ice Hockey League (EIHL). He previously played in the National Hockey League (NHL) with the Chicago Blackhawks and New York Islanders.

== Playing career ==
Keith was drafted 59th overall in the 2001 NHL entry draft by the Chicago Blackhawks. He appeared in his first NHL game on February 24, 2004, against the Philadelphia Flyers. On March 1 of that same year against the Nashville Predators, he scored his first goal.

On December 29, 2006, he was traded along with Sébastien Caron and Chris Durno to the Ducks in exchange for P. A. Parenteau and Bruno St. Jacques.

On January 9, 2008, he was traded to the Islanders from the Anaheim Ducks in exchange for Darryl Bootland. Keith appeared in 3 games with the Islanders upon the completion of the 2007–08 season. On July 25, 2008, Keith signed with German team ERC Ingolstadt of the DEL.

For the 2009–10 season Keith returned to North America signing with, the Rockford IceHogs of the AHL, affiliate of the Chicago Blackhawks. Scoring 21 goals in 69 games for the IceHogs, Keith was then signed to a one-year contract with fellow AHL team, the Abbotsford Heat, affiliate of the Calgary Flames on September 28, 2010.

After one season in Sweden with second division side, Örebro HK, Keith moved to the Czech Republic, signing a one-year free agent contract with HC Karlovy Vary on July 9, 2012. After only four games into the 2012–13 Czech Extraliga season, Keith left Karlovy to sign a try-out contract with Dornbirner EC of the Austrian Hockey League on October 8, 2012. He remained with the Bulldogs for the remainder of the year to total 28 points in 37 games.

Following three years in the UK with Braehead Clan, where Keith captained the team, the forward announced his departure from the EIHL in April 2017. He later announced his retirement from professional hockey after 14 seasons.

== Career statistics ==
			Regular season					Playoffs
Season	Team	League	GP	G	A	Pts	PIM	GP	G	A	Pts	PIM
1998–99	Spokane Chiefs	WHL	7	1	0	1	4	—	—	—	—	—
1999–2000	Spokane Chiefs	WHL	39	1	3	4	37	15	1	2	3	11
2000–01	Spokane Chiefs	WHL	33	13	14	27	63	12	1	3	4	14
2001–02	Spokane Chiefs	WHL	68	34	33	67	71	11	5	5	10	16
2002–03	Spokane Chiefs	WHL	7	2	2	4	11	—	—	—	—	—
2002–03	Red Deer Rebels	WHL	49	25	26	51	32	23	6	7	13	30
2003–04	Norfolk Admirals	AHL	66	13	13	26	57	8	1	2	3	10
2003–04	Chicago Blackhawks	NHL	20	2	3	5	10	—	—	—	—	—
2004–05	Norfolk Admirals	AHL	80	18	31	49	74	6	0	1	1	0
2005–06	Norfolk Admirals	AHL	72	26	19	45	61	3	0	1	1	0
2005–06	Chicago Blackhawks	NHL	2	0	0	0	0	—	—	—	—	—
2006–07	Norfolk Admirals	AHL	19	2	8	10	15	—	—	—	—	—
2006–07	Chicago Blackhawks	NHL	2	0	0	0	4	—	—	—	—	—
2006–07	Portland Pirates	AHL	44	10	12	22	22	—	—	—	—	—
2007–08	Portland Pirates	AHL	34	5	5	10	13	—	—	—	—	—
2007–08	Bridgeport Sound Tigers	AHL	42	8	9	17	22	—	—	—	—	—
2007–08	New York Islanders	NHL	3	0	0	0	0	—	—	—	—	—
2008–09	ERC Ingolstadt	DEL	46	15	13	28	60	—	—	—	—	—
2009–10	Rockford IceHogs	AHL	69	21	20	41	27	4	0	0	0	2
2010–11	Abbotsford Heat	AHL	77	20	15	35	45	—	—	—	—	—
2011–12	Örebro HK	Allsv	52	11	16	27	40	10	2	4	6	6
2012–13	HC Energie Karlovy Vary	ELH	4	0	0	0	4	—	—	—	—	—
2012–13	Dornbirner EC	AUT	37	7	21	28	66	—	—	—	—	—
2013–14	EC Red Bull Salzburg	AUT	53	7	8	15	37	13	3	1	4	12
2014–15	Braehead Clan	EIHL	51	18	44	62	59	2	0	0	0	2
2015–16	Braehead Clan	EIHL	46	19	29	48	67	2	0	1	1	2
2016–17	Braehead Clan	EIHL	52	13	18	31	52	2	0	0	0	0
AHL totals			503	123	132	255	336	21	1	4	5	12
NHL totals			27	2	3	5	14	—	—	—	—	—
