= Neil Trimm =

Canadian ice hockey player

- Born: February 15, 1983 (age 43) Westmeath, Ontario, Canada
- Height: 6 ft 2 in (188 cm)
- Weight: 190 lb (86 kg; 13 st 8 lb)
- Position: Forward
- Shot: Right
- Played for: CHL; New Mexico Scorpions; Laredo Bucks; ECHL; Cincinnati Cyclones; Metal Ligaen; Frederikshavn White Hawks; EIHL; Braehead Clan; Coventry Blaze
- NHL draft: Undrafted
- Playing career: 2008–2016

Neil Trimm (born February 15, 1983) is a Canadian former professional ice hockey player.

== Career ==
Trimm turned professional in 2008 after signing a contract with the New Mexico Scorpions of the Central Hockey League. He then signed with the Laredo Bucks of the CHL and stayed for two seasons. During his second season with the Bucks during the 2010-11 CHL season, Trimm scored 80 points, including 58 assists, and played in the CHL All-Star game. Despite his prolific scoring, the Bucks failed to make the playoffs.

Trimm moved to the ECHL for the 2011-12 season and signed for the Cincinnati Cyclones, but he only played two games for the team before re-joining the Bucks. The Bucks suspended operations on May 1, 2012, and Trimm moved on to the Wichita Thunder where he scored 76 points, which included 35 goals.

In 2013, Trimm moved to Europe and signed for the Frederikshavn White Hawks of the Metal Ligaen in Denmark. However, he only made six appearances before leaving four months later to sign for the Braehead Clan in the Elite Ice Hockey League in the United Kingdom and managed 58 points, including 42 assists in 45 games. He re-signed for a second season with the Scottish team for the 2014-15 EIHL season, scoring 26 goals and 41 assists for 67 points in 52 games. In 2015, Trimm moved to the Coventry Blaze of the EIHL, but he only managed to net seven goals in 36 games before he departed and made a return to Glasgow to finish the season, and eventually his career, with the Clan. Trimm would not sign another contract and retired from hockey.

== Awards and honours ==
Award	Year
ECAC First All-Star Team	2005–06
Booth Bucks (First ever winner)	2018-19
