= Shane Lust =

Canadian ice hockey player

- Born: August 29, 1986 (age 39) Calgary, Alberta, Canada
- Height: 6 ft 2 in (188 cm)
- Weight: 172 lb (78 kg; 12 st 4 lb)
- Position: Left wing
- Shot: Left
- Played for: Pingouins de Morzine-Avoriaz; Braehead Clan; Dundee Stars; Fayetteville FireAntz
- NHL draft: Undrafted
- Playing career: 2011–2016

Shane Lust (born August 29, 1986) is a Canadian former ice hockey player.

== Early life ==
Born in Calgary, Alberta, Lust attended the Southern Alberta Institute of Technology from 2007 to 2011, where he played four seasons of college hockey in the Alberta Colleges Athletics Conference.

== Career ==
Following his graduation, Lust played two seasons with the Pingouins de Morzine-Avoriaz of the French Ligue Magnus, before signing with the Braehead Clan for the 2013–14 season.

Lust transferred from Braehead Clan to their Elite League Gardiner Conference rivals Dundee Stars on July 14, 2014. He then moved to the Southern Professional Hockey League with the Fayetteville FireAntz for the 2015–16, but only played four games for the team before retiring to become assistant coach of the Calgary Northstars, a midget level team.
