= Martin Tůma =

Czech ice hockey player

- Born: 15 September 1985 (age 40) Most, Czechoslovakia
- Height: 6 ft 4 in (193 cm)
- Weight: 209 lb (95 kg; 14 st 13 lb)
- Position: Defence
- Shot: Left
- Played for: HC Litvínov; San Antonio Rampage; Rochester Americans; HC České Budějovice; HK Acroni Jesenice; HK Nitra; Nottingham Panthers; Braehead Clan; Dornbirner EC
- NHL draft: 162nd overall, 2003; Florida Panthers
- Playing career: 2005–2016, 2020

Martin Tůma (born 15 September 1985) is a Czech professional ice hockey defenceman who last played for the Danbury Hat Tricks of the Federal Prospects Hockey League. He was selected by the Florida Panthers in the 5th round (162nd overall) of the 2003 NHL entry draft.

== Playing career ==
Tůma played junior hockey in HC Litvínov's system in the Czech Republic. After his third season with HC Litvínov's junior team, he was drafted 162nd overall in the 2003 NHL entry draft by the Florida Panthers. Tůma subsequently moved to North America to play major junior hockey in the Ontario Hockey League (OHL) with the Sault Ste. Marie Greyhounds.

After completing the 2004–05 OHL season, Tůma turned professional and began playing in the Panthers' farm system in the American Hockey League (AHL) and ECHL. After stints with the San Antonio Rampage, Rochester Americans and Florida Everblades, Tůma returned to his native Czech Republic to play for HC Litvínov of the Czech Extraliga. For the 2012–2013 season Martin signed with the Nottingham Panthers of the Elite Ice Hockey League before being signed on 27 November 2012 by Braehead Clan.

Martin Tůma
Medal record

Representing Czech Republic

Ice hockey

World Junior Championships
| Bronze medal – third place | 2005 | United States |

== International play ==
Tůma has made one appearance for the Czech Republic internationally at the 2005 World Junior Championships in the United States where he earned a bronze medal.

== Career statistics ==
=== Regular season and playoffs ===
| | | | Regular season | | | | | Playoffs |
| Season | Team | League | GP | G | A | Pts | PIM | GP | G | A | Pts | PIM |
|---|---|---|---|---|---|---|---|---|---|---|---|---|
| 2000–01 | HC Chemopetrol | CZE U18 | 45 | 4 | 12 | 16 | 62 | 6 | 0 | 3 | 3 | 8 |
| 2001–02 | HC Chemopetrol | CZE U18 | 11 | 2 | 2 | 4 | 82 | 2 | 0 | 0 | 0 | 0 |
| 2001–02 | HC Chemopetrol | CZE U20 | 36 | 2 | 0 | 2 | 69 | 1 | 0 | 0 | 0 | 0 |
| 2001–02 | HC Chemopetrol | ELH | 1 | 0 | 0 | 0 | 2 | — | — | — | — | — |
| 2002–03 | HC Chemopetrol | CZE U20 | 22 | 0 | 3 | 3 | 36 | — | — | — | — | — |
| 2003–04 | Sault Ste. Marie Greyhounds | OHL | 57 | 0 | 5 | 5 | 48 | — | — | — | — | — |
| 2004–05 | Sault Ste. Marie Greyhounds | OHL | 61 | 10 | 13 | 23 | 107 | 7 | 0 | 3 | 3 | 6 |
| 2004–05 | San Antonio Rampage | AHL | 5 | 0 | 1 | 1 | 0 | — | — | — | — | — |
| 2005–06 | Rochester Americans | AHL | 12 | 0 | 2 | 2 | 38 | — | — | — | — | — |
| 2005–06 | Florida Everblades | ECHL | 48 | 0 | 6 | 6 | 75 | 1 | 0 | 0 | 0 | 0 |
| 2006–07 | Rochester Americans | AHL | 23 | 0 | 0 | 0 | 33 | 1 | 0 | 0 | 0 | 0 |
| 2006–07 | Florida Everblades | ECHL | 32 | 0 | 9 | 9 | 77 | 3 | 0 | 0 | 0 | 6 |
| 2007–08 | HC Litvínov | ELH | 35 | 1 | 0 | 1 | 56 | 5 | 0 | 0 | 0 | 2 |
| 2008–09 | HC Slovan Ústečtí Lvi | CZE.2 | 44 | 2 | 12 | 14 | 73 | 9 | 0 | 1 | 1 | 10 |
| 2009–10 | HC Mountfield | ELH | 21 | 0 | 0 | 0 | 43 | 2 | 0 | 0 | 0 | 6 |
| 2010–11 | HC Mountfield | ELH | 24 | 0 | 2 | 2 | 16 | — | — | — | — | — |
| 2010–11 | HC Tábor | CZE.2 | 1 | 0 | 0 | 0 | 0 | — | — | — | — | — |
| 2010–11 | IHC KOMTERM Písek | CZE.2 | 7 | 1 | 0 | 1 | 6 | — | — | — | — | — |
| 2010–11 | HC Tábor B | CZE.4 | 1 | 1 | 0 | 1 | 0 | — | — | — | — | — |
| 2011–12 | HK Acroni Jesenice | AUT | 14 | 0 | 4 | 4 | 78 | — | — | — | — | — |
| 2011–12 | HK Nitra | SVK | 13 | 1 | 2 | 3 | 37 | — | — | — | — | — |
| 2012–13 | Nottingham Panthers | GBR | 9 | 0 | 0 | 0 | 43 | — | — | — | — | — |
| 2012–13 | Braehead Clan | GBR | 4 | 0 | 2 | 2 | 9 | — | — | — | — | — |
| 2012–13 | Dornbirner EC | AUT | 6 | 0 | 0 | 0 | 4 | — | — | — | — | — |
| 2013–14 | HC Most | CZE.2 | 22 | 0 | 7 | 7 | 85 | — | — | — | — | — |
| 2015–16 | Columbus Cottonmouths | SPHL | 12 | 0 | 0 | 0 | 16 | — | — | — | — | — |
| 2015–16 | Danbury Titans | FHL | 11 | 0 | 0 | 0 | 5 | 4 | 0 | 0 | 0 | 22 |
| 2019–20 | Danbury Hat Tricks | FPHL | 19 | 0 | 6 | 6 | 43 | — | — | — | — | — |
| ELH totals | | | 81 | 1 | 2 | 3 | 117 | 7 | 0 | 0 | 0 | 8 |
| AHL totals | | | 40 | 0 | 3 | 3 | 71 | 1 | 0 | 0 | 0 | 0 |
| ECHL totals | | | 80 | 0 | 15 | 15 | 152 | 4 | 0 | 0 | 0 | 6 |

=== International ===
| Year | Team | Event | GP | G | A | Pts | PIM |
|---|---|---|---|---|---|---|---|
| 2002 | Czech Republic | U18 | 5 | 1 |
| 2003 | Czech Republic | WJC18 | 6 | 0 | 0 | 0 | 29 |
| 2005 | Czech Republic | WJC | 7 | 0 | 0 | 0 | 28 |
| Junior totals | | | 13 | 0 | 0 | 0 | 57 |
