= Drew Bannister =

Canadian ice hockey player and coach (born 1974)

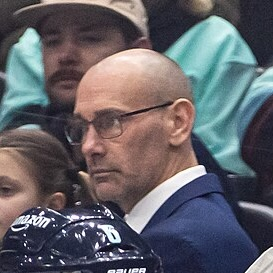
- Bannister in 2024
- Born: April 9, 1974 (age 51); Belleville, Ontario, Canada
- Height: 6 ft 2 in (188 cm)
- Weight: 201 lb (91 kg; 14 st 5 lb)
- Position: Defence
- Shot: Right
- Played for: Tampa Bay Lightning; Edmonton Oilers; Mighty Ducks of Anaheim; New York Rangers; Kärpät; Severstal Cherepovets; Espoo Blues; Nürnberg Ice Tigers; Kassel Huskies; Hull Stingrays; Braehead Clan
- Coached for: St. Louis Blues
- NHL draft: 26th overall, 1992; Tampa Bay Lightning
- Playing career: 1994–2012
- Coaching career: 2011–present

Drew Bannister (born April 9, 1974) is a Canadian professional ice hockey coach and former player who most recently was the head coach for the St. Louis Blues of the National Hockey League (NHL). He played in the NHL for the Tampa Bay Lightning, Edmonton Oilers, Mighty Ducks of Anaheim and New York Rangers. He finished his playing career as a player and head coach for the Braehead Clan of the British Elite Ice Hockey League. Bannister was born in Belleville, Ontario, but grew up in Sudbury, Ontario.

== Playing career ==
Bannister was selected in the second round, 26th overall, of the 1992 NHL entry draft by the Tampa Bay Lightning. Bannister was drafted from the Sault Ste. Marie Greyhounds of the Ontario Hockey League (OHL) where he won a Memorial Cup in 1993 and was chosen to the Memorial Cup All-Star team in 1992 and 1993. He also won World Junior Championship with Canada national junior team in 1994. Upon completing his junior eligibility, Bannister spent a year and a half with the Atlanta Knights of the International Hockey League (IHL), Tampa Bay's farm team.

Bannister played in the minors for most of his career but saw time in the National Hockey League (NHL) with the Mighty Ducks of Anaheim, Edmonton Oilers, Tampa Bay Lightning, and New York Rangers. His most successful season came in 1996–97, when he played 65 games, scored a career-high 18 points, and played in 12 playoff games for the Oilers.

In 2002, Bannister moved to Europe and played for teams in Finland, Russia and Germany. In the 2007–08 season, he was named best defenceman while playing for Kassel Huskies of Germany's 2nd Bundesliga, and also won the championship which promoted the team to the Deutsche Eishockey Liga.

On August 6, 2009, Bannister made a return to North America after seven seasons, signing a one-year deal with the Ottawa Senators. He spent the majority of the season with their AHL affiliate, the Binghamton Senators, serving as captain. Binghamton's then-assistant coach, former AHL defenceman Mike Busniuk, happened to be Bannister's father-in-law.

== Coaching career ==
On November 16, 2010, Bannister signed for the Hull Stingrays in the British Elite Ice Hockey League as a player and assistant coach. On July 29, 2011, Bannister was announced as a player and head coach of the Braehead Clan in the British Elite Ice Hockey League for the 2011–12 season, replacing Bruce Richardson.

On June 2, 2012, Bannister was announced as an assistant coach for the OHL's Owen Sound Attack, which effectively ended his playing career. On July 10, 2015, he left the assistant coaching job in Owen Sound to become a head coach for the Sault Ste. Marie Greyhounds.

On June 5, 2018, he was hired as the head coach of the San Antonio Rampage in the American Hockey League (AHL), the top development team for the St. Louis Blues of the National Hockey League (NHL). In 2020, after the Rampage were sold and moved to southern Nevada, Bannister became head coach of the new Blues' affiliate in Springfield, Massachusetts.

On December 12, 2023, Bannister was named interim head coach of the St. Louis Blues of the NHL following the firing of Craig Berube. On May 8, 2024, following the 2023–24 season, Bannister was promoted to permanent head coach of the Blues, signing a two-year contract.

On November 24, 2024, the Blues fired Bannister after the team started the 2024–25 season with a 9–12–1 record.

== Career statistics ==
=== Regular season and playoffs ===
			Regular season					Playoffs
Season	Team	League	GP	G	A	Pts	PIM	GP	G	A	Pts	PIM
1990–91	Sault Ste. Marie Greyhounds	OHL	41	2	8	10	51	4	0	0	0	0
1991–92	Sault Ste. Marie Greyhounds	OHL	64	4	21	25	122	16	3	10	13	36
1992–93	Sault Ste. Marie Greyhounds	OHL	59	5	28	33	114	18	2	7	9	12
1993–94	Sault Ste. Marie Greyhounds	OHL	58	7	43	50	108	14	6	9	15	20
1994–95	Atlanta Knights	IHL	72	5	7	12	74	5	0	2	2	22
1995–96	Atlanta Knights	IHL	61	3	13	16	105	3	0	0	0	4
1995–96	Tampa Bay Lightning	NHL	13	0	1	1	4	—	—	—	—	—
1996–97	Tampa Bay Lightning	NHL	64	4	13	17	44	—	—	—	—	—
1996–97	Edmonton Oilers	NHL	1	0	1	1	0	12	0	0	0	30
1997–98	Edmonton Oilers	NHL	34	0	2	2	42	—	—	—	—	—
1997–98	Mighty Ducks of Anaheim	NHL	27	0	6	6	47	—	—	—	—	—
1998–99	Tampa Bay Lightning	NHL	21	1	2	3	24	—	—	—	—	—
1998–99	Las Vegas Thunder	IHL	16	2	1	3	73	—	—	—	—	—
1999–00	Hartford Wolf Pack	AHL	44	6	14	20	121	18	2	9	11	53
2000–01	Hartford Wolf Pack	AHL	73	9	30	39	143	5	0	2	2	6
2000–01	New York Rangers	NHL	3	0	0	0	0	—	—	—	—	—
2001–02	Cincinnati Mighty Ducks	AHL	30	1	10	11	57	3	0	1	1	6
2001–02	Mighty Ducks of Anaheim	NHL	1	0	0	0	0	—	—	—	—	—
2002–03	Kärpät	SM-l	41	2	12	14	81	14	2	0	2	42
2003–04	Severstal Cherepovets	RSL	3	0	0	0	4	—	—	—	—	—
2003–04	Blues	SM-l	36	2	8	10	42	9	0	3	3	26
2004–05	Nürnberg Ice Tigers	DEL	46	1	12	13	97	—	—	—	—	—
2005–06	Kassel Huskies	DEL	44	9	12	21	79	—	—	—	—	—
2006–07	Kassel Huskies	GBun.2	43	9	32	41	109	8	1	6	7	8
2007–08	Kassel Huskies	GBun.2	41	11	27	38	73	15	4	12	16	28
2008–09	Kassel Huskies	DEL	34	2	15	17	84	—	—	—	—	—
2009–10	Binghamton Senators	AHL	57	4	10	14	77	—	—	—	—	—
2010–11	Hull Stingrays	EIHL	34	5	15	20	50	2	0	2	2	2
2011–12	Braehead Clan	EIHL	55	13	42	45	114	—	—	—	—	—
NHL totals			164	5	25	30	161	12	0	0	0	30

Medal record

Representing Canada

Ice hockey

World Junior Championships
Gold medal – first place	1994 Czech Republic	

=== International ===
Year	Team	Event	Result	GP	G	A	Pts	PIM
1994	Canada	WJC	1st place, gold medalist(s)	7	0	4	4	10
Junior totals				7	0	4	4	10

== Head coaching record ==
Team	Year	Regular season						Postseason			
Team	Year	G	W	L	OTL	Pts	Finish	W	L	Win %	Result
STL	2023–24	54	30	19	5	(65)	5th in Central	—	—	—	Missed playoffs
STL	2024–25	22	9	12	1	(19)	(fired)	—	—	—	—
Total		76	39	31	6			—	—	—	

Sporting positions
Preceded by Craig Berube	Head coach of the St. Louis Blues; 2023–2024	Succeeded by Jim Montgomery
