= Jason Morgan (ice hockey) =

Canadian ice hockey player and coach

- Born: October 9, 1976 (age 49) St. John's, Newfoundland, Canada
- Height: 6 ft 1 in (185 cm)
- Weight: 210 lb (95 kg; 15 st 0 lb)
- Position: Centre
- Shot: Left
- Played for: Los Angeles Kings; Calgary Flames; Nashville Predators; Chicago Blackhawks; Minnesota Wild
- NHL draft: 118th overall, 1995; Los Angeles Kings
- Playing career: 1996–2013

Jason Morgan (born October 9, 1976) is a Canadian professional ice hockey coach and former player.

== Playing career ==
Morgan was drafted by the Los Angeles Kings in the fifth round, 118th overall, in the 1995 NHL entry draft. While he spent most of his career in the minors, he played in a total of 44 games for five different NHL teams, including the Los Angeles Kings, Calgary Flames, Nashville Predators, Chicago Blackhawks and Minnesota Wild.

Morgan signed with Swedish Elitserien team Södertälje SK in 2008. In 2009, he returned to America with the Springfield Falcons, but after four games he departed and moved to Austria, signing for EC KAC, based in Klagenfurt. Morgan then spent the 2010-11 season in Norway with Stjernen.

After a stint with ECHL's Stockton Thunder in 2011–12, he signed as a free agent to a one-year contract with the Arizona Sundogs of the CHL on September 7, 2012. He spent two years with the Sundogs and retired at the end of the 2013-14 season.

Over the course of his pro career, Morgan played in 584 AHL games and saw the ice in 121 CHL as well as in 120 ECHL contests.

== Coaching career ==
Following his playing career, Morgan took over coaching duties in Hungary, serving as head coach of the youth teams of Miskolc/Debreceni HK. In January 2016, he was named head coach of DVTK Jegesmedvék, a member of the MOL Liga and guided the team to the title. More recently, he was head coach of Glasgow Clan in the UK's Elite Ice Hockey League.

== Career statistics ==
| | | | Regular season | | | | | Playoffs |
| Season | Team | League | GP | G | A | Pts | PIM | GP | G | A | Pts | PIM |
|---|---|---|---|---|---|---|---|---|---|---|---|---|
| 1992–93 | Kitchener Jr. Rangers AAA | AH U18 | 69 | 44 | 40 | 84 | 85 | — | — | — | — | — |
| 1993–94 | Kitchener Rangers | OHL | 65 | 6 | 15 | 21 | 16 | 5 | 1 | 0 | 1 | 0 |
| 1994–95 | Kitchener Rangers | OHL | 35 | 3 | 15 | 18 | 25 | — | — | — | — | — |
| 1994–95 | Kingston Frontenacs | OHL | 20 | 0 | 3 | 3 | 14 | 6 | 0 | 2 | 2 | 0 |
| 1995–96 | Kingston Frontenacs | OHL | 66 | 16 | 38 | 54 | 50 | 6 | 1 | 2 | 3 | 0 |
| 1996–97 | Los Angeles Kings | NHL | 3 | 0 | 0 | 0 | 0 | — | — | — | — | — |
| 1996–97 | Phoenix Roadrunners | IHL | 57 | 3 | 6 | 9 | 29 | — | — | — | — | — |
| 1996–97 | Mississippi Sea Wolves | ECHL | 6 | 3 | 0 | 3 | 0 | 3 | 1 | 1 | 2 | 6 |
| 1997–98 | Los Angeles Kings | NHL | 11 | 1 | 0 | 1 | 4 | — | — | — | — | — |
| 1997–98 | Springfield Falcons | AHL | 58 | 13 | 22 | 35 | 66 | 3 | 1 | 0 | 1 | 18 |
| 1998–99 | Springfield Falcons | AHL | 46 | 6 | 16 | 22 | 51 | 3 | 0 | 0 | 0 | 6 |
| 1998–99 | Long Beach Ice Dogs | IHL | 13 | 4 | 6 | 10 | 18 | — | — | — | — | — |
| 1999–2000 | Florida Everblades | ECHL | 48 | 14 | 25 | 39 | 79 | 5 | 2 | 2 | 4 | 16 |
| 1999–2000 | Cincinnati Cyclones | IHL | 15 | 1 | 3 | 4 | 14 | — | — | — | — | — |
| 2000–01 | Florida Everblades | ECHL | 37 | 15 | 22 | 37 | 41 | 5 | 2 | 3 | 5 | 17 |
| 2000–01 | Hamilton Bulldogs | AHL | 11 | 2 | 0 | 2 | 10 | — | — | — | — | — |
| 2000–01 | Springfield Falcons | AHL | 16 | 1 | 4 | 5 | 19 | — | — | — | — | — |
| 2000–01 | Saint John Flames | AHL | — | — | — | — | — | 6 | 0 | 1 | 1 | 2 |
| 2001–02 | Saint John Flames | AHL | 76 | 17 | 20 | 37 | 69 | — | — | — | — | — |
| 2002–03 | Saint John Flames | AHL | 80 | 13 | 40 | 53 | 63 | — | — | — | — | — |
| 2003–04 | Calgary Flames | NHL | 13 | 0 | 2 | 2 | 2 | — | — | — | — | — |
| 2003–04 | Lowell Lock Monsters | AHL | 21 | 6 | 13 | 19 | 16 | — | — | — | — | — |
| 2003–04 | Nashville Predators | NHL | 6 | 0 | 2 | 2 | 2 | — | — | — | — | — |
| 2003–04 | Norfolk Admirals | AHL | 19 | 6 | 8 | 14 | 16 | 8 | 0 | 1 | 1 | 10 |
| 2004–05 | Norfolk Admirals | AHL | 71 | 9 | 20 | 29 | 116 | 6 | 2 | 2 | 4 | 8 |
| 2005–06 | Chicago Blackhawks | NHL | 7 | 1 | 1 | 2 | 6 | — | — | — | — | — |
| 2005–06 | Norfolk Admirals | AHL | 51 | 8 | 31 | 39 | 58 | — | — | — | — | — |
| 2006–07 | Minnesota Wild | NHL | 4 | 0 | 0 | 0 | 4 | — | — | — | — | — |
| 2006–07 | Houston Aeros | AHL | 57 | 12 | 14 | 26 | 73 | — | — | — | — | — |
| 2007–08 | Hershey Bears | AHL | 74 | 19 | 25 | 44 | 99 | 4 | 0 | 3 | 3 | 9 |
| 2008–09 | Södertälje SK | SEL | 49 | 3 | 8 | 11 | 66 | — | — | — | — | — |
| 2009–10 | Springfield Falcons | AHL | 4 | 0 | 0 | 0 | 0 | — | — | — | — | — |
| 2009–10 | EC KAC | AUT | 24 | 1 | 5 | 6 | 38 | 4 | 0 | 1 | 1 | 0 |
| 2010–11 | Stjernen Hockey | NOR | 40 | 8 | 15 | 23 | 140 | — | — | — | — | — |
| 2011–12 | Stockton Thunder | ECHL | 29 | 2 | 9 | 11 | 26 | 8 | 0 | 2 | 2 | 7 |
| 2012–13 | Arizona Sundogs | CHL | 66 | 18 | 28 | 46 | 45 | 4 | 0 | 1 | 1 | 2 |
| 2013–14 | Arizona Sundogs | CHL | 55 | 11 | 28 | 39 | 74 | 11 | 0 | 1 | 1 | 8 |
| NHL totals | | | 44 | 2 | 5 | 7 | 18 | — | — | — | — | — |
| AHL totals | | | 584 | 112 | 213 | 325 | 656 | 30 | 3 | 7 | 10 | 53 |
| ECHL totals | | | 120 | 34 | 56 | 90 | 146 | 21 | 5 | 8 | 13 | 46 |
