= Ryan Finnerty =

Canadian ice hockey player and coach

- Born: November 23, 1980 (age 44); Lethbridge, Alberta, Canada
- Height: 5 ft 10 in (178 cm)
- Weight: 190 lb (86 kg; 13 st 8 lb)
- Position: Centre
- Shot: Right
- Played for: Medicine Hat Tigers; Cowichan Valley Capitals; Swift Current Broncos; South Surrey Eagles; Peoria Rivermen; San Angelo Saints; Victoria Salmon Kings; South Carolina Stingrays; Kaltern/Caldaro; Bloomington PrairieThunder; Cardiff Devils; Sheffield Steelers
- NHL draft: Undrafted
- Playing career: 1997–2012

Ryan Finnerty (born November 23, 1980) is a Canadian former professional ice hockey player. He is currently General Manager and co-owner of Manchester Storm in the EIHL.

Finnerty, who also coached Manchester Storm between 2017 and 2022, was previously the coach of both Sheffield Steelers and Braehead Clan.

== Career ==
Finnerty played minor hockey within the Alberta AAA Midget Hockey League for the Monarch Cable TV Tigers signing with the Medicine Hat Tigers of the Western Hockey League (WHL). He played three games for the Medicine Hat Tigers during the 1997–1998 season before being demoted to their Tier 2 team, the Camrose Kodiaks. He was eventually recalled to the WHL where he recorded his first major junior goal in a 3–2 win over the Lethbridge Hurricanes on October 29, 1997. Finnerty joined the Peoria Rivermen of the ECHL for two seasons, playing a total of 119 games and earning 302 penalty minutes, before signing with the San Angelo Saints, Victoria Salmon Kings and South Carolina Stingrays. While with the Saints in the Central Hockey League, Finnerty was named team captain to begin their 2003–04 season. He returned to the ECHL on September 13, 2005 after being traded for Trevor G Johnson to the South Carolina Stingrays.

=== Professional ===
After spending time in Italy, Finnerty joined the Sheffield Steelers of the British Elite Ice Hockey League until his wife failed to secure a job at their local university. He returned to the United States and played with the Bloomington PrairieThunder before coming to agreement with the Cardiff Devils and signed a contract with them.

== Coaching career ==
In 2013, Finnerty was appointed the Head Coach of the Braehead Clan, a Scottish professional ice hockey team. However, he was given a three-match ban to begin the season for abusing an official. He stayed with the Braehead Clan until 2017, when the team failed to qualify past the Elite League Play-Offs quarter-final stage. He was quickly hired by the Manchester Storm as their head coach and signed to a two-year contract.

Finnerty stepped down from his Manchester Storm head coach position in April 2022, following five years in charge. He reverted to the sole title as General Manager from the 2022–23 Elite League season.
