= 2012–13 EIHL season =

- League: Elite Ice Hockey League
- Sport: Ice hockey
- Duration: September – March

Regular season
- Champions: Nottingham Panthers

Playoffs
- Champions: Nottingham Panthers

Challenge Cup
- Champions: Nottingham Panthers

Conferences
- Gardiner champions: Braehead Clan
- Erhardt champions: Belfast Giants

EIHL seasons
- 2011–12 2013–14

The 2012–13 Elite Ice Hockey League season was the tenth season of the Elite Ice Hockey League. The regular season began on Saturday 8 September 2012 and ended on Sunday 24 March 2013, followed by the Play-Offs which culminated in the end-of-season Play-Off Finals on Saturday 6 and Sunday 7 April 2013.

This season saw the introduction of a new two conference format, in which the ten participating teams were split into two conferences of five teams. The Gardiner Conference, named after former Chicago Blackhawks goaltender Charlie Gardiner, comprised the five northernmost mainland teams (Braehead Clan, Dundee Stars, Edinburgh Capitals, Fife Flyers and Hull Stingrays) and the Erhardt Conference, named after the captain of the British 1936 Winter Olympics gold medal-winning team Carl Erhardt, comprised the four southernmost mainland teams (Cardiff Devils, Coventry Blaze, Nottingham Panthers and Sheffield Steelers) and one team from Northern Ireland (Belfast Giants). The most prestigious honour remained the overall League Championship, awarded to the team with the most points gained from all league games (conference and inter-conference games). The season also included the end-of-season Play-Offs and the Challenge Cup.

Nottingham Panthers won the Elite League Championship – their first British League Championship title for 57 years – when they defeated their nearest challengers Belfast Giants 5–3 at the Odyssey Arena on Friday 15 March 2013. However, the Giants would prevent the Panthers achieving a regular season double of League and Conference titles by shading a very close Erhardt Conference title race on regulation time wins after both teams finished level on points. The Gardiner Conference proved even more exciting with all five teams never being more than a few wins apart, at one stage towards the end of the season only one point separating first and last place. Braehead Clan eventually ran out Conference Champions in a very successful first season for the new two-conference format.

The Challenge Cup was won for the fourth successive season by Nottingham Panthers, clinching their second honour of the season by defeating Sheffield Steelers 5–3 on aggregate in the two-legged final. The Panthers then overcame a big scare at the hands of Fife Flyers in the Play-Off Quarter-Finals to defeat Cardiff Devils in the semi-finals and then Belfast Giants 3–2 in overtime in the Final. This third successive Play-Offs victory also gave them the treble of League Championship, Play-Offs and Challenge Cup, the first time the treble has been won since Coventry Blaze's success in 2004–05.

This season was the 10th Anniversary of both the EIHL League and the EIHL Play-Offs. In what is referred to as the 'Final Four Weekend', the semi-finals and Final of the Play-Offs were played on consecutive days at the National Ice Centre in Nottingham on Saturday 6 and Sunday 7 April 2013.

== Team information ==
TEAM	CONFERENCE	CITY/TOWN	ARENA	CAPACITY
Belfast Giants	Erhardt	Belfast	Odyssey Arena	8,300
Braehead Clan	Gardiner	(Scotland) Renfrew	Braehead Arena	3,750
Cardiff Devils	Erhardt	(Wales) Cardiff	Cardiff Arena	2,500
Coventry Blaze	Erhardt	(England) Coventry	SkyDome Arena	3,000
Dundee Stars	Gardiner	(Scotland) Dundee	Dundee Ice Arena	2,400
Edinburgh Capitals	Gardiner	(Scotland) Edinburgh	Murrayfield Ice Rink	3,800
Fife Flyers	Gardiner	(Scotland) Kirkcaldy	Fife Ice Arena	2,414
Hull Stingrays	Gardiner	(England) Hull	Hull Arena	3,150
Nottingham Panthers	Erhardt	(England) Nottingham	National Ice Centre	6,900
Sheffield Steelers	Erhardt	(England) Sheffield	Motorpoint Arena	8,500

== Regular season ==
The League Championship was played for over 52 games, each team playing teams in their own conference eight times (four home and four away) and teams in the other conference four times (two home and two away).

The Conference Championships were played for over 32 games, each team playing teams in their own conference eight times (four home and four away).

Teams were awarded two points for a win (in regulation time, overtime or shoot-out), one point for a tie (in regulation time but loss in overtime or shoot-out) and no points for a loss (in regulation time). Teams level on points were separated by (1) total number of games won in regulation time, (2) total number of all games won, (3) results between teams or (4) fewest losses.

The top eight teams in the League Championship qualified for the Play-Offs.

=== Results ===
	HOME ▼ / AWAY ►	GARDINER CONFERENCE					ERHARDT CONFERENCE				
	HOME ▼ / AWAY ►	BC	DS	EC	FF	HS	BG	CD	CB	NP	SS
G A R D I N E R C O N F E R E N C E	Braehead Clan; All results by date		5–2; 3–4; 6–3; 4–3	6–3; 6–1; 3–4; 1–4	4–3; 5–3; 3–4; 5–1	4–3; 2–1; 4–1; 1–2	2–3; 2–6	5–7; 2–6	5–2; 4–5	1–5; 0–5	2–7; 4–5
G A R D I N E R C O N F E R E N C E	Dundee Stars; All results by date	5–3; 4–1; 2–4; 3–0		3–2; 5–4; 2–0; 2–3	3–4; 6–5; 4–1; 5–4	3–2; 2–1; 8–7; 5–0	2–5; 0–2	1–9; 4–2	2–3; 3–4	1–5; 1–4	3–4; 1–3
G A R D I N E R C O N F E R E N C E	Edinburgh Capitals; All results by date	1–4; 8–4; 5–3; 5–2	5–2; 3–4; 8–2; 4–2		5–2; 2–3; 7–2; 2–4	4–3; 1–3; 6–2; 9–5	1–4; 3–2	4–2; 3–6	0–1; 6–2	0–5; 1–6	2–3; 2–3
G A R D I N E R C O N F E R E N C E	Fife Flyers; All results by date	5–1; 2–3; 1–3; 4–1	1–2; 6–3; 5–0; 5–3	2–1; 4–1; 7–1; 5–1		4–3; 3–2; 5–1; 4–2	1–3; 4–1	4–2; 5–4	3–2; 3–2	3–5; 2–10	4–2; 3–6
G A R D I N E R C O N F E R E N C E	Hull Stingrays; All results by date	4–5; 6–4; 2–7; 3–2	1–3; 4–3; 5–1; 5–3	6–3; 1–0; 2–3; 4–3	5–4; 3–2; 5–2; 3–1		1–4; 2–3	2–1; 2–4	2–7; 4–1	1–3; 1–3	2–4; 1–3
	HOME ▲▼ / AWAY ►	BC	DS	EC	FF	HS	BG	CD	CB	NP	SS
E R H A R D T C O N F E R E N C E	Belfast Giants; All results by date	4–3; 2–6	2–1; 2–5	9–1; 5–0	5–1; 3–0	5–4; 5–4		6–3; 4–1; 5–4; 5–0	4–1; 4–3; 2–5; 8–2	3–2; 2–3; 3–5; 5–2	1–5; 3–0; 1–4; 3–1
E R H A R D T C O N F E R E N C E	Cardiff Devils; All results by date	3–4; 5–1	4–2; 3–2	4–1; 4–5	4–0; 3–1	2–1; 2–3	0–4; 4–3; 3–4; 3–5		5–2; 1–4; 4–3; 2–3	2–1; 2–3; 2–4; 3–6	3–4; 2–1; 1–2; 4–5
E R H A R D T C O N F E R E N C E	Coventry Blaze; All results by date	5–1; 2–0	6–0; 4–1	5–2; 3–2	4–3; 6–3	2–1; 3–2	5–4; 5–8; 0–2; 2–4	2–1; 3–4; 3–6; 4–3		5–2; 0–8; 1–4; 2–6	3–4; 0–3; 5–3; 3–8
E R H A R D T C O N F E R E N C E	Nottingham Panthers; All results by date	5–4; 7–3	5–1; 8–1	10–0; 1–2	7–1; 5–3	6–0; 8–4	3–5; 3–2; 6–1; 4–5	4–2; 5–0; 4–1; 4–3	4–2; 4–3; 1–0; 8–3		2–3; 3–2; 4–2; 2–0
E R H A R D T C O N F E R E N C E	Sheffield Steelers; All results by date	7–3; 7–2	5–4; 3–1	1–2; 2–3	4–2; 3–0	4–0; 4–3	5–4; 2–1; 1–2; 2–3	2–4; 2–3; 5–4; 4–3	7–5; 3–4; 3–2; 4–2	1–2; 9–4; 2–4; 5–2	
	HOME ▲ / AWAY ►	BC	DS	EC	FF	HS	BG	CD	CB	NP	SS
	HOME ▲ / AWAY ►	GARDINER CONFERENCE					ERHARDT CONFERENCE				

Grid Colours: Blue = league & conference games; Pink = league games.

Result Colours: Black = regulation time result; Green = overtime result; Red = shoot-out result.

=== League Standings ===
PS	TEAM	GP	W	L	T	PTS	GF	GA	WROS	LROS	L10	STK
1	Nottingham Panthers	52	42	9	1	85	232	111	35–1–6	9–0–1	9–1–0	W2
2	Belfast Giants	52	37	10	5	79	191	132	33–1–3	10–2–3	8–2–0	W3
3	Sheffield Steelers	52	35	14	3	73	184	133	28–5–2	14–0–3	5–4–1	L1
4	Coventry Blaze	52	24	22	6	54	156	181	18–3–3	22–4–2	5–5–0	L3
5	Cardiff Devils	52	21	23	8	50	160	168	16–4–1	23–2–6	1–8–1	L1
6	Edinburgh Capitals	52	22	26	4	48	149	184	18–1–3	26–3–1	6–4–0	W2
7	Fife Flyers	52	23	27	2	48	154	176	17–2–4	27–1–1	5–5–0	W3
8	Braehead Clan	52	20	26	6	46	163	200	16–0–4	26–6–0	3–5–2	L1
9	Dundee Stars	52	19	27	6	44	138	194	14–3–2	27–2–4	3–7–0	L3
10	Hull Stingrays	52	17	26	9	43	137	185	15–2–0	26–2–7	5–5–0	W1

=== Conference standings ===
Gardiner Conference

PS	TEAM	GP	W	L	T	PTS	GF	GA	WROS	LROS	L10	STK
1	Braehead Clan	32	17	12	3	37	109	102	14–0–3	12–3–0	4–5–1	L1
2	Fife Flyers	32	17	13	2	36	108	95	13–2–2	13–1–1	5–5–0	W3
3	Dundee Stars	32	17	14	1	35	102	111	12–3–2	14–0–1	3–7–0	L3
4	Hull Stingrays	32	14	11	7	35	97	111	12–2–0	11–1–6	6–3–1	L1
5	Edinburgh Capitals	32	15	14	3	33	109	106	13–0–2	14–2–1	6–3–1	W2

Erhardt Conference

PS	TEAM	GP	W	L	T	PTS	GF	GA	WROS	LROS	L10	STK
1	Belfast Giants	32	21	6	5	47	116	89	18–0–3	6–2–3	8–2–0	W3
2	Nottingham Panthers	32	23	8	1	47	119	81	17–0–6	8–0–1	8–2–0	W2
3	Sheffield Steelers	32	18	12	2	38	104	89	14–2–2	12–0–2	6–4–0	L1
4	Coventry Blaze	32	9	18	5	23	87	134	7–2–0	18–4–1	3–6–1	L2
5	Cardiff Devils	32	9	18	5	23	83	116	6–3–0	18–1–4	0–9–1	L1

=== Team Records ===
Belfast Giants
GAMES	GP	W	L	T	PTS	GF	GA	WROS	LROS	L10	STK	BS	WS	WL
EL total	52	37	10	5	79	191	132	33–1–3	10–2–3	8–2–0	W3	W7	L2	TL2
EL Home	26	19	6	1	39	101	66	16–1–2	6–0–1	7–3–0	W1	W4	L2	TL2
EL Away	26	18	4	4	40	90	66	17–0–1	4–2–2	9–1–0	W2	W8	L1	TL2
EC Total	32	21	6	5	47	116	89	18–0–3	6–2–3	8–2–0	W3	W5	L2	TL2
EC Home	16	11	4	1	23	59	41	9–0–2	4–0–1	7–3–0	W1	W4	L1	TL1
EC Away	16	10	2	4	24	57	48	9–0–1	2–2–2	8–1–1	W7	W7	L1	TL2
vs GC Total	20	16	4	0	32	75	43	15–1–0	4–0–0	7–3–0	L1	W7	L1	TL1
vs GC Home	10	8	2	0	16	42	25	7–1–0	2–0–0	8–2–0	W2	W5	L1	TL1
vs GC Away	10	8	2	0	16	33	18	8–0–0	2–0–0	8–2–0	L1	W4	L1	TL1

Braehead Clan
GAMES	GP	W	L	T	PTS	GF	GA	WROS	LROS	L10	STK	BS	WS	WL
EL total	52	20	26	6	46	163	200	16–0–4	26–6–0	3–5–2	L1	W3	L4	TL7
EL Home	26	12	10	4	28	89	93	11–0–1	10–4–0	4–4–2	W3	W3	L3	TL5
EL Away	26	8	16	2	18	74	107	5–0–3	16–2–0	3–7–0	L6	W3	L6	TL6
GC Total	32	17	12	3	37	109	102	14–0–3	12–3–0	4–5–1	L1	W5	L3	TL3
GC Home	16	11	2	3	25	62	42	10–0–1	2–3–0	5–2–3	W3	W6	L1	TL3
GC Away	16	6	10	0	12	47	60	4–0–2	10–0–0	4–6–0	L4	W3	L4	TL4
vs EC Total	20	3	14	3	9	54	98	2–0–1	14–3–0	1–7–2	L2	W1	L4	TL7
vs EC Home	10	1	8	1	3	27	51	1–0–0	8–1–0	1–8–1	L2	W1	L4	TL7
vs EC Away	10	2	6	2	6	27	47	1–0–1	6–2–0	2–6–2	L2	W1	L2	TL6

Cardiff Devils
GAMES	GP	W	L	T	PTS	GF	GA	WROS	LROS	L10	STK	BS	WS	WL
EL total	52	21	23	8	50	160	168	16–4–1	23–2–6	1–8–1	L1	W3	L6	TL6
EL Home	26	12	9	5	29	75	74	8–3–1	9–1–4	2–6–2	L4	W7	L4	TL4
EL Away	26	9	14	3	21	85	94	8–1–0	14–1–2	1–7–2	T1	W2	L4	TL7
EC Total	32	9	18	5	23	83	116	6–3–0	18–1–4	0–9–1	L1	W2	L8	TL11
EC Home	16	5	8	3	13	41	54	3–2–0	8–0–3	1–7–2	L5	W4	L5	TL6
EC Away	16	4	10	2	10	42	62	3–1–0	10–1–1	2–7–1	T1	W1	L6	TL7
vs GC Total	20	12	5	3	27	77	52	10–1–1	5–1–2	5–3–2	W2	W3	L2	TL3
vs GC Home	10	7	1	2	16	34	20	5–1–1	1–1–1	7–1–2	W1	W5	L1	TL1
vs GC Away	10	5	4	1	11	43	32	5–0–0	4–0–1	5–4–1	W1	W1	L1	TL2

Coventry Blaze
GAMES	GP	W	L	T	PTS	GF	GA	WROS	LROS	L10	STK	BS	WS	WL
EL total	52	24	22	6	54	156	181	18–3–3	22–4–2	5–5–0	L3	W3	L3	TL5
EL Home	26	15	9	2	32	83	85	12–2–1	9–2–0	5–5–0	L2	W6	L2	TL2
EL Away	26	9	13	4	22	73	96	6–1–2	13–2–2	4–5–1	L1	W2	L2	TL6
EC Total	32	9	18	5	23	87	134	7–2–0	18–4–1	3–6–1	L2	W2	L4	TL8
EC Home	16	5	9	2	12	43	70	3–2–0	9–2–0	3–7–0	L2	W1	L3	TL3
EC Away	16	4	9	3	11	44	64	4–0–0	9–2–1	3–4–3	W1	W1	L4	TL6
vs GC Total	20	15	4	1	31	69	47	11–1–3	4–0–1	7–3–0	L1	W10	L2	TL2
vs GC Home	10	10	0	0	20	40	15	9–0–1	0-0-0	10–0–0	W10	W10	–	–
vs GC Away	10	5	4	1	11	29	32	2–1–2	4–0–1	5–4–1	L3	W3	L3	TL3

Dundee Stars
GAMES	GP	W	L	T	PTS	GF	GA	WROS	LROS	L10	STK	BS	WS	WL
EL total	52	19	27	6	44	138	194	14–3–2	27–2–4	3–7–0	L3	W5	L4	TL7
EL Home	26	14	8	4	32	80	82	10–2–2	8–1–3	5–5–0	L1	W4	L3	TL4
EL Away	26	5	19	2	12	58	112	4–1–0	19–1–1	0–9–1	L5	W3	L5	TL10
GC Total	32	17	14	1	35	102	111	12–3–2	14–0–1	3–7–0	L3	W4	L3	TL3
GC Home	16	13	2	1	27	62	41	9–2–2	2–0–1	7–2–1	L1	W6	L1	TL1
GC Away	16	4	12	0	8	40	70	3–1–0	12–0–0	2–8–0	L8	W2	L8	TL8
vs EC Total	20	2	13	5	9	36	83	2–0–0	13–2–3	2–7–1	L4	W2	L4	TL13
vs EC Home	10	1	6	3	5	18	41	1–0–0	6–1–2	1–6–3	L3	W1	L3	TL6
vs EC Away	10	1	7	2	4	18	42	1–0–0	7–1–1	1–7–2	L1	W1	L3	TL7

Edinburgh Capitals
GAMES	GP	W	L	T	PTS	GF	GA	WROS	LROS	L10	STK	BS	WS	WL
EL total	52	22	26	4	48	149	184	18–1–3	26–3–1	6–4–0	W2	W4	L6	TL6
EL Home	26	14	10	2	30	97	81	13–0–1	10–2–0	7–2–1	W1	W4	L2	TL3
EL Away	26	8	16	2	18	52	103	5–1–2	16–1–1	5–4–1	W1	W2	L8	TL11
GC Total	32	15	14	3	33	109	106	13–0–2	14–2–1	6–3–1	W2	W4	L3	TL3
GC Home	16	11	4	1	23	75	47	10–0–1	4–1–0	7–2–1	W1	W4	L1	TL2
GC Away	16	4	10	2	10	34	59	3–0–1	10–1–1	4–5–1	W1	W1	L6	TL8
vs EC Total	20	7	12	1	15	40	78	5–1–1	12–1–0	5–4–1	W1	W2	L4	TL4
vs EC Home	10	3	6	1	7	22	34	3–0–0	6–1–0	3–6–1	W1	W1	L3	TL4
vs EC Away	10	4	6	0	8	18	44	2–1–1	6–0–0	4–6–0	W1	W3	L4	TL4

Fife Flyers
GAMES	GP	W	L	T	PTS	GF	GA	WROS	LROS	L10	STK	BS	WS	WL
EL total	52	23	27	2	48	154	176	17–2–4	27–1–1	5–5–0	W3	W3	L5	TL5
EL Home	26	19	6	1	39	95	65	16–0–3	6–0–1	9–1–0	W2	W7	L2	TL3
EL Away	26	4	21	1	9	59	111	1–2–1	21–1–0	1–8–1	W1	W3	L11	TL11
GC Total	32	17	13	2	36	108	95	13–2–2	13–1–1	5–5–0	W3	W3	L3	TL3
GC Home	16	13	2	1	27	63	28	12–0–1	2–0–1	8–1–1	W7	W7	L1	TL2
GC Away	16	4	11	1	9	45	67	1–2–1	11–1–0	3–6–1	W1	W3	L6	TL7
vs EC Total	20	6	14	0	12	46	81	4–0–2	14–0–0	3–7–0	L1	W1	L4	TL4
vs EC Home	10	6	4	0	12	32	37	4–0–2	4–0–0	6–4–0	L1	W2	L1	TL1
vs EC Away	10	0	10	0	0	14	44	0-0-0	10–0–0	0–10–0	L10	–	L10	TL10

Hull Stingrays
GAMES	GP	W	L	T	PTS	GF	GA	WROS	LROS	L10	STK	BS	WS	WL
EL total	52	17	26	9	43	137	185	15–2–0	26–2–7	5–5–0	W1	W4	L6	TL7
EL Home	26	14	10	2	30	77	79	13–1–0	10–0–2	7–3–0	W1	W5	L3	TL3
EL Away	26	3	16	7	13	60	106	2–1–0	16–2–5	1–8–1	L2	W1	L3	TL9
GC Total	32	14	11	7	35	97	111	12–2–0	11–1–6	6–3–1	L1	W4	L3	TL4
GC Home	16	12	2	2	26	59	46	11–1–0	2–0–2	8–1–1	W6	W6	L1	TL2
GC Away	16	2	9	5	9	38	65	1–1–0	9–1–4	1–7–2	L1	W1	L2	TL9
vs EC Total	20	3	15	2	8	40	74	3–0–0	15–1–1	2–7–1	W1	W1	L7	TL9
vs EC Home	10	2	8	0	4	18	33	2–0–0	8–0–0	2–8–0	W1	W1	L6	TL6
vs EC Away	10	1	7	2	4	22	41	1–0–0	7–1–1	1–7–2	L3	W1	L3	TL5

Nottingham Panthers
GAMES	GP	W	L	T	PTS	GF	GA	WROS	LROS	L10	STK	BS	WS	WL
EL total	52	42	9	1	85	232	111	35–1–6	9–0–1	9–1–0	W2	W10	L1	TL1
EL Home	26	22	4	0	44	123	53	18–1–3	4–0–0	9–1–0	W6	W8	L1	TL1
EL Away	26	20	5	1	41	109	58	17–0–3	5–0–1	8–2–0	W1	W6	L1	TL2
EC Total	32	23	8	1	47	119	81	17–0–6	8–0–1	8–2–0	W2	W7	L2	TL3
EC Home	16	13	3	0	26	61	34	10–0–3	3–0–0	9–1–0	W4	W8	L1	TL1
EC Away	16	10	5	1	21	58	47	7–0–3	5–0–1	7–3–0	W1	W4	L2	TL3
vs GC Total	20	19	1	0	38	113	30	18–1–0	1–0–0	10–0–0	W10	W10	L1	TL1
vs GC Home	10	9	1	0	18	62	19	8–1–0	1–0–0	9–1–0	W4	W5	L1	TL1
vs GC Away	10	10	0	0	20	51	11	10–0–0	0-0-0	10–0–0	W10	W10	–	–

Sheffield Steelers
GAMES	GP	W	L	T	PTS	GF	GA	WROS	LROS	L10	STK	BS	WS	WL
EL total	52	35	14	3	73	184	133	28–5–2	14–0–3	5–4–1	L1	W7	L2	TL3
EL Home	26	17	7	2	36	97	69	14–2–1	7–0–2	7–2–1	L1	W4	L2	TL2
EL Away	26	18	7	1	37	87	64	14–3–1	7–0–1	7–3–0	W2	W6	L2	TL2
EC Total	32	18	12	2	38	104	89	14–2–2	12–0–2	6–4–0	L1	W5	L3	TL4
EC Home	16	9	6	1	19	57	49	7–1–1	6–0–1	6–4–0	L1	W3	L2	TL2
EC Away	16	9	6	1	19	47	40	7–1–1	6–0–1	4–5–1	W2	W3	L3	TL3
vs GC Total	20	17	2	1	35	80	44	14–3–0	2–0–1	9–0–1	W1	W10	L1	TL1
vs GC Home	10	8	1	1	17	40	20	7–1–0	1–0–1	8–1–1	W1	W4	L1	TL1
vs GC Away	10	9	1	0	18	40	24	7–2–0	1–0–0	9–1–0	W9	W9	L1	TL1

== Play-Offs ==
The quarter-finals were played over two legs, home and away. The semi-finals and Final were played over a single leg at a neutral venue, the National Ice Centre, in the 'Play-Off Finals Weekend'.

The Play-Off seeds were (1) Nottingham Panthers, (2) Belfast Giants, (3) Braehead Clan, (4) Sheffield Steelers, (5) Coventry Blaze, (6) Cardiff Devils, (7) Edinburgh Capitals and (8) Fife Flyers (in order of League Champions, best Conference Champions, second best Conference Champions, final League Championship positions respectively).

=== Quarter-finals ===
TEAM 1	TEAM 2	1ST LEG	2ND LEG	AGGREGATE
Nottingham Panthers	Fife Flyers	2–4	3–0	(5–4)
Belfast Giants	Edinburgh Capitals	3–1	4–3	(7–4)
Braehead Clan	Cardiff Devils	7–5	2–7	(9–12)
Sheffield Steelers	Coventry Blaze	3–2	2–4	(5–6)

Nottingham Panthers vs Fife Flyers

1st Leg	Fife Flyers	4–2	Nottingham Panthers	Fife Ice Arena	Recap
Bryan Pitton 49 saves / 51 shots		Goalie stats	Craig Kowalski 26 saves / 30 shots

2nd Leg	Nottingham Panthers	3–0	Fife Flyers	National Ice Centre	Recap
Craig Kowalski 25 saves / 25 shots		Goalie stats	Bryan Pitton 22 saves / 25 shots

Nottingham Panthers win 5–4 on aggregate.

Belfast Giants vs Edinburgh Capitals

1st Leg	Belfast Giants	3–1	Edinburgh Capitals	Odyssey Arena	Recap
Stephen Murphy 23 saves / 24 shots		Goalie stats	Tomáš Hiadlovský 30 saves / 33 shots

2nd Leg	Edinburgh Capitals	3–4	Belfast Giants	Murrayfield Ice Rink	Recap
Tomáš Hiadlovský 33 saves / 36 shots		Goalie stats	Stephen Murphy 20 saves / 23 shots

Belfast Giants win 7–4 on aggregate.

Braehead Clan vs Cardiff Devils

1st Leg	Braehead Clan	7–5	Cardiff Devils	Braehead Arena	Recap
Daren Machesney 40 saves / 45 shots		Goalie stats	Chris Whitley 28 saves / 35 shots

2nd Leg	Cardiff Devils	7–2	Braehead Clan	Cardiff Arena	Recap
Chris Whitley 25 saves / 27 shots		Goalie stats	Daren Machesney 30 saves / 37 shots

Cardiff Devils win 12–9 on aggregate.

Sheffield Steelers vs Coventry Blaze

1st Leg	Coventry Blaze	2–3	Sheffield Steelers	SkyDome Arena	Recap
Peter Hirsch 38 saves / 41 shots		Goalie stats	John DeCaro 26 saves / 28 shots

2nd Leg	Sheffield Steelers	2–4	OT	Coventry Blaze	Motorpoint Arena	Recap
John DeCaro 30 saves / 34 shots		Goalie stats		Peter Hirsch 38 saves / 40 shots

Coventry Blaze win 6–5 on aggregate.

=== Semi-finals ===
TEAM 1	TEAM 2	VENUE	SINGLE LEG
Nottingham Panthers	Cardiff Devils	National Ice Centre	6–3
Belfast Giants	Coventry Blaze	National Ice Centre	5–1

Nottingham Panthers vs Cardiff Devils

Semi-Final	Nottingham Panthers	6–3	Cardiff Devils	National Ice Centre	Recap
Craig Kowalski 33 saves / 36 shots		Goalie stats	Chris Whitley 29 saves / 34 shots

Belfast Giants vs Coventry Blaze

Semi-Final	Belfast Giants	5–1	Coventry Blaze	National Ice Centre	Recap
Stephen Murphy 22 saves / 23 shots		Goalie stats	Peter Hirsch 43 saves / 48 shots

3rd Place Play-Off

TEAM 1	TEAM 2	VENUE	SINGLE LEG
Coventry Blaze	Cardiff Devils	National Ice Centre	11–5

Coventry Blaze vs Cardiff Devils

3rd Place; Play-Off	Coventry Blaze	11–5	Cardiff Devils	National Ice Centre	Recap
Peter Hirsch 14 saves / 17 shots Declan Ryan 23 saves / 25 shots		Goalie stats	Chris Whitley 8 saves / 13 shots Joe Myers 18 saves / 24 shots

=== Final ===
TEAM 1	TEAM 2	VENUE	SINGLE LEG
Nottingham Panthers	Belfast Giants	National Ice Centre	3–2

Nottingham Panthers vs Belfast Giants

Final	Nottingham Panthers	3–2	OT	Belfast Giants	National Ice Centre	Recap
Craig Kowalski 28 saves / 30 shots		Goalie stats		Stephen Murphy 32 saves / 35 shots

== Challenge Cup ==
The First Round comprised two groups of five teams, each team playing teams in their own group twice (once home and once away), totalling eight games.

In the First Round group games, teams were awarded two points for a win (in regulation time, overtime or shoot-out), one point for a tie (in regulation time but loss in overtime or shoot-out) and no points for a loss (in regulation time). Teams level on points were separated by (1) total number of games won in regulation time, (2) total number of all games won, (3) results between teams or (4) fewest losses.

The top four teams from each First Round group qualified for the quarter-finals. The quarter-final ties were decided by final group positions (A1-B4, B1-A4, A2-B3, B2-A3). The quarter-finals, semi-finals and Final were all played over two legs, home and away.

Due to scheduling constraints, some League Championship games doubled up as Challenge Cup games.

=== First round ===
Group A

Results (All Group Game results by date)

HOME ▼ / AWAY ►	BG	BC	DS	EC	FF
Belfast Giants		3–2	2–1	9–1	5–1
Braehead Clan	3–2		5–2	6–3	4–3
Dundee Stars	2–5	2–1		3–2	1–0
Edinburgh Capitals	1–4	4–3	3–5		2–4
Fife Flyers	1–3	5–1	5–2	2–0	
HOME ▲ / AWAY ►	BG	BC	DS	EC	FF

Result Colours: Black = regulation time result; Green = overtime result; Red = shoot-out result.

Standings

PS	TEAM	GP	W	L	T	PTS	GF	GA	WROS	LROS	L4	STK
1	Belfast Giants	8	7	1	0	14	33	12	7–0–0	1–0–0	4–0–0	W7
2	Braehead Clan	8	4	3	1	9	25	24	4–0–0	3–1–0	3–1–0	W3
3	Fife Flyers	8	4	4	0	8	21	18	4–0–0	4–0–0	0–4–0	L4
4	Dundee Stars	8	4	4	0	8	18	23	4–0–0	4–0–0	2–2–0	L1
5	Edinburgh Capitals	8	1	7	0	2	16	36	0–1–0	7–0–0	0–4–0	L6

Challenge Cup first round group A team records
TEAM/GAMES	GP	W	L	T	PTS	GF	GA	WROS	LROS	L4	STK	BS	WS	WL
BG Total	8	7	1	0	14	33	12	7–0–0	1–0–0	4–0–0	W7	W7	L1	TL1
BG Home	4	4	0	0	8	19	5	4–0–0	0-0-0	4–0–0	W4	W4	–	–
BG Away	4	3	1	0	6	14	7	3–0–0	1–0–0	3–1–0	W3	W3	L1	TL1
BC Total	8	4	3	1	9	25	24	4–0–0	3–1–0	3–1–0	W3	W3	L3	TL4
BC Home	4	4	0	0	8	18	10	4–0–0	0-0-0	4–0–0	W4	W4	–	–
BC Away	4	0	3	1	1	7	14	0-0-0	3–1–0	0–3–1	L3	T1	L3	TL4
DS Total	8	4	4	0	8	18	23	4–0–0	4–0–0	2–2–0	L1	W2	L2	TL2
DS Home	4	3	1	0	6	8	8	3–0–0	1–0–0	3–1–0	L1	W3	L1	TL1
DS Away	4	1	3	0	2	10	15	1–0–0	3–0–0	1–3–0	L1	W1	L2	TL2
EC Total	8	1	7	0	2	16	36	0–1–0	7–0–0	0–4–0	L6	W1	L6	TL6
EC Home	4	1	3	0	2	10	16	0–1–0	3–0–0	1–3–0	L3	W1	L3	TL3
EC Away	4	0	4	0	0	6	20	0-0-0	4–0–0	0–4–0	L4	–	L4	TL4
FF Total	8	4	4	0	8	21	18	4–0–0	4–0–0	0–4–0	L4	W4	L4	TL4
FF Home	4	3	1	0	6	13	6	3–0–0	1–0–0	3–1–0	L1	W3	L1	TL1
FF Away	4	1	3	0	2	8	12	1–0–0	3–0–0	1–3–0	L3	W1	L3	TL3

Group B

Results (All Group Game results by date)

HOME ▼ / AWAY ►	CD	CB	HS	NP	SS
Cardiff Devils		2–3	3–4	6–5	7–6
Coventry Blaze	2–1		6–5	3–1	1–2
Hull Stingrays	7–5	4–2		2–4	3–6
Nottingham Panthers	4–2	4–3	6–0		3–2
Sheffield Steelers	4–3	7–2	4–2	4–3	
HOME ▲ / AWAY ►	CD	CB	HS	NP	SS

Result Colours: Black = regulation time result; Green = overtime result; Red = shoot-out result.

Standings

PS	TEAM	GP	W	L	T	PTS	GF	GA	WROS	LROS	L4	STK
1	Sheffield Steelers	8	6	1	1	13	35	24	4–1–1	1–0–1	2–1–1	W1
2	Nottingham Panthers	8	5	1	2	12	30	22	5–0–0	1–2–0	2–1–1	W2
3	Coventry Blaze	8	4	4	0	8	22	26	3–0–1	4–0–0	0–4–0	L4
4	Hull Stingrays	8	3	4	1	7	27	36	3–0–0	4–0–1	2–2–0	W2
5	Cardiff Devils	8	2	5	1	5	29	35	0–1–1	5–0–1	1–3–0	W1

Challenge Cup first round group B team records
TEAM/GAMES	GP	W	L	T	PTS	GF	GA	WROS	LROS	L4	STK	BS	WS	WL
CD Total	8	2	5	1	5	29	35	0–1–1	5–0–1	1–3–0	W1	W1	L3	TL5
CD Home	4	2	2	0	4	18	18	0–1–1	2–0–0	2–2–0	W1	W1	L2	TL2
CD Away	4	0	3	1	1	11	17	0-0-0	3–0–1	0–3–1	L1	T1	L2	TL4
CB Total	8	4	4	0	8	22	26	3–0–1	4–0–0	0–4–0	L4	W4	L4	TL4
CB Home	4	3	1	0	6	12	9	2–0–1	1–0–0	3–1–0	L1	W3	L1	TL1
CB Away	4	1	3	0	2	10	17	1–0–0	3–0–0	1–3–0	L3	W1	L3	TL3
HS Total	8	3	4	1	7	27	36	3–0–0	4–0–1	2–2–0	W2	W2	L2	TL4
HS Home	4	2	2	0	4	16	17	2–0–0	2–0–0	2–2–0	W1	W1	L1	TL1
HS Away	4	1	2	1	3	11	19	1–0–0	2–0–1	1–2–1	W1	W1	L2	TL3
NP Total	8	5	1	2	12	30	22	5–0–0	1–2–0	2–1–1	W2	W2	L1	TL2
NP Home	4	4	0	0	8	17	7	4–0–0	0-0-0	4–0–0	W4	W4	–	–
NP Away	4	1	1	2	4	13	15	1–0–0	1–2–0	1–1–2	T1	W1	L1	TL3
SS Total	8	6	1	1	13	35	24	4–1–1	1–0–1	2–1–1	W1	W5	L1	TL2
SS Home	4	4	0	0	8	19	10	2–1–1	0-0-0	4–0–0	W4	W4	–	–
SS Away	4	2	1	1	5	16	14	2–0–0	1–0–1	2–1–1	W1	W1	L1	TL2

=== Quarter-finals ===
TEAM 1	TEAM 2	1ST LEG	2ND LEG	AGGREGATE
Belfast Giants	Hull Stingrays	3–1	5–4	(8–5)
Sheffield Steelers	Dundee Stars	2–4	7–0	(9–4)
Braehead Clan	Coventry Blaze	2–2	4–3	(6–5)
Nottingham Panthers	Fife Flyers	3–2	5–2	(8–4)

Belfast Giants vs Hull Stingrays

1st Leg	Hull Stingrays	1–3	Belfast Giants	Hull Arena	Recap
Ben Bowns 26 saves / 29 shots		Goalie stats	Stephen Murphy 26 saves / 27 shots

2nd Leg	Belfast Giants	5–4	Hull Stingrays	Odyssey Arena	Recap
Stephen Murphy 20 saves / 24 shots		Goalie stats	Ben Bowns 37 saves / 42 shots

Belfast Giants win 8–5 on aggregate.

Sheffield Steelers vs Dundee Stars

1st Leg	Dundee Stars	4–2	Sheffield Steelers	Dundee Ice Arena	Recap
Nic Riopel 40 saves / 42 shots		Goalie stats	John DeCaro 19 saves / 23 shots

2nd Leg	Sheffield Steelers	7–0	Dundee Stars	Motorpoint Arena	Recap
John DeCaro 16 saves / 16 shots		Goalie stats	Nic Riopel 35 saves / 42 shots Craig Chalmers 1 save / 1 shot

Sheffield Steelers win 9–4 on aggregate.

Braehead Clan vs Coventry Blaze

1st Leg	Coventry Blaze	2–2	Braehead Clan	SkyDome Arena	Recap
Peter Hirsch 34 saves / 36 shots		Goalie stats	Daren Machesney 46 saves / 48 shots

2nd Leg	Braehead Clan	4–3	Coventry Blaze	Braehead Arena	Recap
Daren Machesney 32 saves / 35 shots		Goalie stats	Peter Hirsch 28 saves / 32 shots

Braehead Clan win 6–5 on aggregate.

Nottingham Panthers vs Fife Flyers

1st Leg	Fife Flyers	2–3	Nottingham Panthers	Fife Ice Arena	Recap
Bryan Pitton 35 saves / 38 shots		Goalie stats	Craig Kowalski 29 saves / 31 shots

2nd Leg	Nottingham Panthers	5–2	Fife Flyers	National Ice Centre	Recap
Craig Kowalski 13 saves / 15 shots		Goalie stats	Bryan Pitton 42 saves / 47 shots

Nottingham Panthers win 8–4 on aggregate.

=== Semi-finals ===
TEAM 1	TEAM 2	1ST LEG	2ND LEG	AGGREGATE
Belfast Giants	Nottingham Panthers	1–5	3–4	(4–9)
Sheffield Steelers	Braehead Clan	4–2	4–2	(8–4)

Belfast Giants vs Nottingham Panthers

1st Leg	Nottingham Panthers	5–1	Belfast Giants	National Ice Centre	Recap
Craig Kowalski 24 saves / 25 shots		Goalie stats	Garrett Zemlak 30 saves / 35 shots

2nd Leg	Belfast Giants	3–4	Nottingham Panthers	Odyssey Arena	Recap
Stephen Murphy 29 saves / 33 shots		Goalie stats	Craig Kowalski 20 saves / 23 shots

Nottingham Panthers win 9–4 on aggregate.

Sheffield Steelers vs Braehead Clan

1st Leg	Braehead Clan	2–4	Sheffield Steelers	Braehead Arena	Recap
Daren Machesney 24 saves / 28 shots		Goalie stats	John DeCaro 27 saves / 29 shots

2nd Leg	Sheffield Steelers	4–2	Braehead Clan	Motorpoint Arena	Recap
John DeCaro 23 saves / 25 shots		Goalie stats	Daren Machesney 45 saves / 49 shots

Sheffield Steelers win 8–4 on aggregate.

=== Final ===
TEAM 1	TEAM 2	1ST LEG	2ND LEG	AGGREGATE
Sheffield Steelers	Nottingham Panthers	1–4	2–1	(3–5)

Sheffield Steelers vs Nottingham Panthers

1st Leg	Sheffield Steelers	1–4	Nottingham Panthers	Motorpoint Arena	Recap
John DeCaro 31 saves / 35 shots		Goalie stats	Craig Kowalski 22 saves / 23 shots

2nd Leg	Nottingham Panthers	1–2	Sheffield Steelers	National Ice Centre	Recap
Craig Kowalski 26 saves / 28 shots		Goalie stats	John DeCaro 27 saves / 28 shots

Nottingham Panthers win 5–3 on aggregate.

== Player statistics ==
=== Regular season ===
Points
PLAYER	TEAM	PLAYED	GOALS	ASSISTS	POINTS
(Canada) David Ling	Nottingham Panthers	57	35	60	95
(Finland) Sami Ryhänen	Dundee Stars	56	29	65	94
(Canada) Ash Goldie	Braehead Clan	56	34	46	80
(Canada) Bobby Chaumont¹	Fife Flyers	55	30	50	80
(Canada) Mike Wirll	Dundee Stars	57	35	43	78
(Canada) Chris Blight	Cardiff Devils	59	21	54	75
(Canada) Jeff Legue	Sheffield Steelers	60	34	39	73
(Canada) Stuart MacRae	Cardiff Devils	59	27	45	72
(Slovakia) René Jarolín	Edinburgh Capitals	56	31	40	71
(Canada) Jereme Tendler	Hull Stingrays	58	43	27	70
(Canada) Bruce Graham	Nottingham Panthers	56	37	31	68
(Canada) Mac Faulkner	Cardiff Devils	45	35	30	65
(United States) Casey Haines	Fife Flyers	45	24	40	64
(Canada) Kris Hogg	Fife Flyers	55	29	32	61
(United States) Noah Clarke	Belfast Giants	54	21	40	61
(Canada) Jason Silverthorn	Hull Stingrays	57	21	40	61
(Slovakia) Richard Hartmann	Edinburgh Capitals	53	23	37	60
(Canada) Matt Francis	Nottingham Panthers	57	22	37	59
(Canada) Jason Pitton	Fife Flyers	50	24	34	58
(Canada) Shawn Limpright	Sheffield Steelers	58	21	37	58
¹Season statistics (club statistics: Braehead Clan 18–9–7–16, Fife Flyers 37–21–43–64).

Goaltenders
PLAYER	TEAM	PLD	W	L	T	GA	SO	SV%	GAA
(United States) Craig Kowalski	Nottingham Panthers	54	42	11	1	108	7	.918	2.07
(United Kingdom) Stephen Murphy	Belfast Giants	40	26	11	3	96	3	.914	2.42
(United States) John DeCaro	Sheffield Steelers	55	36	14	4	136	3	.911	2.47
(United States) Phil Osaer	Cardiff Devils	40	19	16	4	112	1	.909	2.81
(Canada) Bryan Pitton	Fife Flyers	52	24	26	1	147	2	.907	2.89
(Denmark) Peter Hirsch	Coventry Blaze	59	28	28	2	184	2	.914	3.15
(Slovakia) Tomáš Hiadlovský	Edinburgh Capitals	51	22	29	0	166	0	.901	3.27
(Canada) Nic Riopel	Dundee Stars	56	23	29	3	184	3	.915	3.33
(United Kingdom) Ben Bowns	Hull Stingrays	54	18	28	8	180	1	.905	3.35
(Canada) Garrett Zemlak¹	Belfast Giants	45	24	19	0	148	4	.896	3.38
¹Season statistics (club statistics: Braehead Clan 30-12-17-0-116-0-.883–3.95, Belfast Giants 15-12-2-0-32-4-.926-2.22)

Goals
PLAYER	TEAM	PLAYED	GOALS
(Canada) Jereme Tendler	Hull Stingrays	58	43
(Canada) Bruce Graham	Nottingham Panthers	56	37
(Canada) Mac Faulkner	Cardiff Devils	45	35
(Canada) David Ling	Nottingham Panthers	57	35
(Canada) Mike Wirll	Dundee Stars	57	35
(Canada) Ash Goldie	Braehead Clan	56	34
(Canada) Jeff Legue	Sheffield Steelers	60	34
(Slovakia) René Jarolín	Edinburgh Capitals	56	31
(Canada) Bobby Chaumont¹	Fife Flyers	55	30
(Canada) Kris Hogg	Fife Flyers	55	29
(Finland) Sami Ryhänen	Dundee Stars	56	29
(Canada) Stuart MacRae	Cardiff Devils	59	27
(United States) Dominic Osman	Hull Stingrays	59	25
(United States) Casey Haines	Fife Flyers	45	24
(Canada) Jason Pitton	Fife Flyers	50	24
(Canada) Brad Leeb	Coventry Blaze	57	24
(Canada) Tylor Michel	Sheffield Steelers	59	24
(United Kingdom) David Clarke	Nottingham Panthers	51	23
(Slovakia) Richard Hartmann	Edinburgh Capitals	53	23
(Canada) Dustin Cameron	Coventry Blaze	54	23
¹Season statistics (club statistics: Braehead Clan 18–9, Fife Flyers 37–21)

Assists
PLAYER	TEAM	PLAYED	ASSISTS
(Finland) Sami Ryhänen	Dundee Stars	56	65
(Canada) David Ling	Nottingham Panthers	57	60
(Canada) Chris Blight	Cardiff Devils	59	54
(Canada) Bobby Chaumont¹	Fife Flyers	55	50
(Canada) Ash Goldie	Braehead Clan	56	46
(Canada) Mike Schutte	Coventry Blaze	57	46
(Canada) Stuart MacRae	Cardiff Devils	59	45
(United States) Jordan Fox	Nottingham Panthers	53	44
(Canada) Mike Wirll	Dundee Stars	57	43
(United States) Casey Haines	Fife Flyers	45	40
(United States) Noah Clarke	Belfast Giants	54	40
(Slovakia) René Jarolín	Edinburgh Capitals	56	40
(Canada) Jason Silverthorn	Hull Stingrays	57	40
(United States) Bill Bagron	Dundee Stars	48	39
(United Kingdom) Matt Davies	Hull Stingrays	59	39
(Canada) Greg Leeb	Coventry Blaze	59	39
(Canada) Jeff Legue	Sheffield Steelers	60	39
(Slovakia) Richard Hartmann	Edinburgh Capitals	53	37
(Canada) Derek Keller	Fife Flyers	56	37
(Canada) Matt Francis	Nottingham Panthers	57	37
¹Season statistics (club statistics: Braehead Clan 18–7, Fife Flyers 37–43)

Penalty Minutes
PLAYER	TEAM	PLAYED	PIMS
(Canada) Benn Olson	Coventry Blaze	53	392
(Canada) Ryan Hand	Hull Stingrays	54	266
(Canada) Adam Keefe	Belfast Giants	54	235
(Canada) Jason Pitton	Fife Flyers	50	187
(Canada) Jeff Hutchins	Dundee Stars	50	182
(Canada) Kurtis Dulle	Hull Stingrays	56	180
(Canada) Devin DiDiomete	Cardiff Devils	25	169
(Canada) Sylvain Cloutier	Hull Stingrays	58	166
(Canada) Mike Egener	Coventry Blaze	56	164
(Canada) Jason Beckett	Nottingham Panthers	56	163
(Canada) Guillaume Lépine	Nottingham Panthers	50	148
(Canada) David Ling	Nottingham Panthers	57	144
(Canada) Tylor Michel	Sheffield Steelers	59	139
(Canada) Drew Fata	Sheffield Steelers	59	137
(United States) Pat Bowen	Dundee Stars	54	133
(Canada) Jeff Caister	Fife Flyers	55	132
(United States) Dominic Osman	Hull Stingrays	59	122
(Canada) Brad Leeb	Coventry Blaze	57	112
(Canada) Dustin Cameron	Coventry Blaze	54	109
(United Kingdom) Neil Hay	Edinburgh Capitals	55	105

=== Play-Offs ===
Points
PLAYER	TEAM	PLAYED	GOALS	ASSISTS	POINTS
(Canada) Chris Blight	Cardiff Devils	4	7	8	15
(Canada) Shea Guthrie	Coventry Blaze	4	6	4	10
(Canada) Stuart MacRae	Cardiff Devils	4	0	10	10
(Israel) Max Birbraer	Cardiff Devils	4	4	3	7
(Canada) Dustin Cameron	Coventry Blaze	4	3	4	7
(Canada) Adam Henrich	Coventry Blaze	4	3	4	7
(United Kingdom) Craig Peacock	Belfast Giants	4	3	4	7
(Canada) Bruce Graham	Nottingham Panthers	4	3	3	6
(Canada) Kevin Saurette	Belfast Giants	4	3	3	6
(Canada) David Ling	Nottingham Panthers	4	2	4	6
(Canada) Ash Goldie	Braehead Clan	2	4	1	5
(United Kingdom) Mark Richardson	Cardiff Devils	4	2	3	5
(Canada) Gerad Adams	Cardiff Devils	4	1	4	5
(United States) Eric Werner	Nottingham Panthers	4	1	4	5
(United Kingdom) David Clarke	Nottingham Panthers	4	0	5	5
(Canada) Jesse Gimblett	Cardiff Devils	4	3	1	4
(United States) Noah Clarke	Belfast Giants	4	2	2	4
(United Kingdom) Colin Shields	Belfast Giants	4	2	2	4
(Latvia) Toms Hartmanis	Braehead Clan	2	0	4	4
(Canada) Jordan Krestanovich	Braehead Clan	2	0	4	4

Goaltenders
PLAYER	TEAM	PLD	W	L	T	GA	SO	SV%	GAA
(United Kingdom) Stephen Murphy	Belfast Giants	4	3	1	0	8	0	.924	1.94
(Canada) Bryan Pitton	Fife Flyers	2	1	1	0	5	0	.935	2.52
(Denmark) Peter Hirsch	Coventry Blaze	4	1	2	0	13	0	.911	3.86
(Canada) Chris Whitley	Cardiff Devils	4	1	2	0	19	0	.826	5.73
(Canada) Daren Machesney	Braehead Clan	2	1	1	0	12	0	.854	6.00

Goals
PLAYER	TEAM	PLAYED	GOALS
(Canada) Chris Blight	Cardiff Devils	4	7
(Canada) Shea Guthrie	Coventry Blaze	4	6
(Canada) Ash Goldie	Braehead Clan	2	4
(Israel) Max Birbraer	Cardiff Devils	4	4
(Canada) Dustin Cameron	Coventry Blaze	4	3
(Canada) Jesse Gimblett	Cardiff Devils	4	3
(Canada) Bruce Graham	Nottingham Panthers	4	3
(Canada) Adam Henrich	Coventry Blaze	4	3
(United Kingdom) Matthew Myers	Nottingham Panthers	4	3
(United Kingdom) Craig Peacock	Belfast Giants	4	3
(Canada) Kevin Saurette	Belfast Giants	4	3
(United Kingdom) Chris Jones	Cardiff Devils	2	2
(Canada) Brock McPherson	Braehead Clan	2	2
(Canada) Tylor Michel	Sheffield Steelers	2	2
(United States) Noah Clarke	Belfast Giants	4	2
(United Kingdom) Robert Lachowicz	Nottingham Panthers	4	2
(Canada) David Ling	Nottingham Panthers	4	2
(United Kingdom) Mark Richardson	Cardiff Devils	4	2
(Canada) Daymen Rycroft	Belfast Giants	4	2
(United Kingdom) Colin Shields	Belfast Giants	4	2

Assists
PLAYER	TEAM	PLAYED	ASSISTS
(Canada) Stuart MacRae	Cardiff Devils	4	10
(Canada) Chris Blight	Cardiff Devils	4	8
(United Kingdom) David Clarke	Nottingham Panthers	4	5
(Latvia) Toms Hartmanis	Braehead Clan	2	4
(Canada) Jordan Krestanovich	Braehead Clan	2	4
(Canada) Gerad Adams	Cardiff Devils	4	4
(Canada) Dustin Cameron	Coventry Blaze	4	4
(Canada) Shea Guthrie	Coventry Blaze	4	4
(Canada) Adam Henrich	Coventry Blaze	4	4
(Canada) David Ling	Nottingham Panthers	4	4
(United Kingdom) Craig Peacock	Belfast Giants	4	4
(United States) Eric Werner	Nottingham Panthers	4	4
(Israel) Max Birbraer	Cardiff Devils	4	3
(Canada) Mike Egener	Coventry Blaze	4	3
(Canada) Bruce Graham	Nottingham Panthers	4	3
(United Kingdom) Mark Richardson	Cardiff Devils	4	3
(Canada) Kevin Saurette	Belfast Giants	4	3
(United Kingdom) Dale White	Coventry Blaze	4	3
(United States) Steve Birnstill	Braehead Clan	2	2
(United Kingdom) John Dolan	Fife Flyers	2	2

Penalty minutes
PLAYER	TEAM	PLAYED	PIMS
(Canada) Craig Cescon	Braehead Clan	2	14
(Canada) Gerad Adams	Cardiff Devils	4	14
(Canada) Benn Olson	Coventry Blaze	3	12
(Slovakia) Tomáš Hiadlovský	Edinburgh Capitals	2	10
(Canada) Jason Beckett	Nottingham Panthers	4	10
(Canada) Brad Leeb	Coventry Blaze	4	10
(Canada) Derek Keller	Fife Flyers	2	8
(Israel) Max Birbraer	Cardiff Devils	4	8
(Canada) Mike Egener	Coventry Blaze	4	8
(Canada) David Ling	Nottingham Panthers	4	8
(Canada) Darryl Lloyd	Belfast Giants	4	8
(United Kingdom) Jason Hewitt	Sheffield Steelers	2	6
(Canada) Kris Hogg	Fife Flyers	2	6
(Canada) Brandon Benedict	Nottingham Panthers	4	6
(Canada) Shea Guthrie	Coventry Blaze	4	6
(Canada) Adam Keefe	Belfast Giants	4	6
(Canada) Guillaume Lépine	Nottingham Panthers	4	6
(United Kingdom) Matthew Myers	Nottingham Panthers	4	6
(United Kingdom) David Phillips	Belfast Giants	4	6
(Canada) Daymen Rycroft	Belfast Giants	4	6

== Season Awards ==
=== Individual awards ===
AWARD	WINNER	TEAM
Player of the Year	(Canada) David Ling	Nottingham Panthers
Coach of the Year	(Canada) Corey Neilson	Nottingham Panthers
Fans Player of the Year	(Canada) David Ling	Nottingham Panthers
British Player of the Year	(United Kingdom) David Clarke	Nottingham Panthers
Netminder of the Year	(United States) Craig Kowalski	Nottingham Panthers
Defenceman of the Year	(Canada) Mike Schutte	Coventry Blaze
Forward of the Year	(Canada) David Ling	Nottingham Panthers
Top Goalscorer	(Canada) Jereme Tendler	Hull Stingrays
Top Points Scorer	(Canada) David Ling	Nottingham Panthers

=== All-Star teams ===
FIRST ALL-STAR TEAM		SECOND ALL-STAR TEAM	
PLAYER	TEAM	PLAYER	TEAM
(United States) Craig Kowalski	Nottingham Panthers	(Canada) Nic Riopel	Dundee Stars
(Canada) Mike Schutte	Coventry Blaze	(Canada) Derek Keller	Fife Flyers
(Canada) Robby Sandrock	Belfast Giants	(United States) Eric Werner	Nottingham Panthers
(Canada) Mac Faulkner	Cardiff Devils	(Canada) Ash Goldie	Braehead Clan
(Canada) David Ling	Nottingham Panthers	(Canada) Bruce Graham	Nottingham Panthers
(Canada) Jereme Tendler	Hull Stingrays	(Finland) Sami Ryhänen	Dundee Stars
