= Jeremy Reich =

Canadian ice hockey player (born 1979)

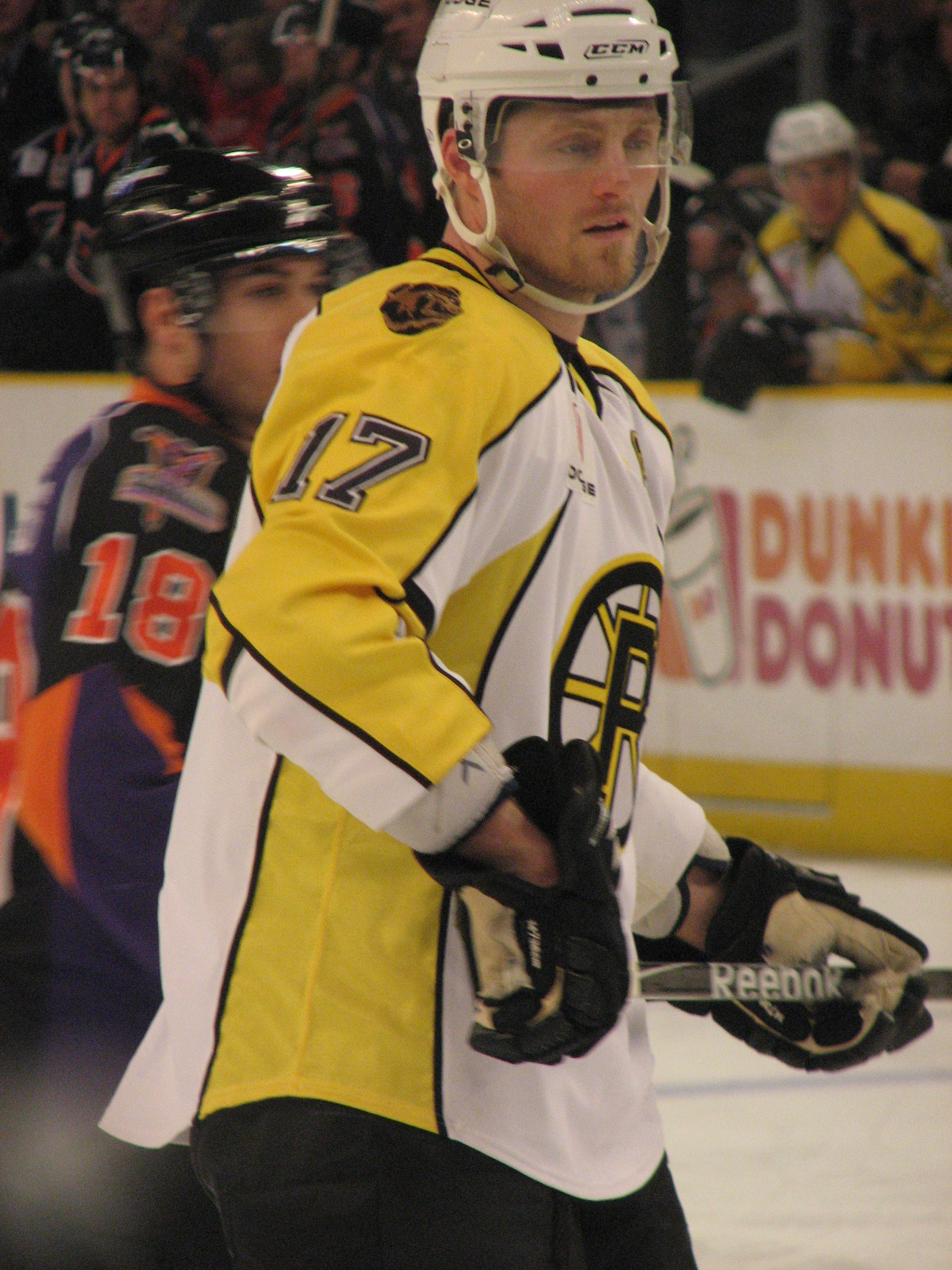
- Reich with the Providence Bruins in 2008
- Born: February 11, 1979 (age 47) Craik, Saskatchewan, Canada
- Height: 6 ft 1 in (185 cm)
- Weight: 203 lb (92 kg; 14 st 7 lb)
- Position: Left wing
- Shot: Left
- Played for: Columbus Blue Jackets; Boston Bruins; ERC Ingolstadt
- NHL draft: 39th overall, 1997; Chicago Blackhawks
- Playing career: 2000–2012

Jeremy Reich (born February 11, 1979) is a Canadian former professional ice hockey player. Reich was a grinder known for his physical play and fighting. He currently serves as an assistant G.M and assistant coach with the Canmore Eagles of the Alberta Junior Hockey League (AJHL).

== Playing career ==
After playing minor hockey with the Saskatoon Contacts of the Saskatchewan Midget AAA Hockey League (SMAAAHL), Reich began his major junior career in the Western Hockey League (WHL) with the Seattle Thunderbirds in 1995–96. After his second WHL season, he was drafted 39th overall in the 1997 NHL entry draft by the Chicago Blackhawks. Upon being drafted, he remained in the WHL and during the 1997–98 season, he was traded from Seattle to the Swift Current Broncos in exchange for Jeffrey Beatch on December 20, 1997.

Reich played his last WHL season with the Broncos in 1999–2000, turning pro the following season in the American Hockey League (AHL) with the Syracuse Crunch. He made his NHL debut in the 2003–04 season with the Columbus Blue Jackets, playing in 9 games and registering 1 assist during a call-up. Late in the 2004–05 AHL season, back with the Crunch, he was loaned to the Houston Aeros on March 10, 2005, in exchange for the loan of Jason Beckett. That off-season, he was signed as a free agent by the Boston Bruins on September 7, 2005. He subsequently began playing with Boston's AHL affiliate, the Providence Bruins. During the 2007–08 season, Reich scored his first NHL goal against his former team, the Columbus Blue Jackets, in a 2–0 win on December 15, 2007.

On July 2, 2009, Reich signed as a free agent to a one-year, two-way contract with the New York Islanders. Assigned to the Islanders AHL affiliate, the Bridgeport Sound Tigers for 2009–10, Reich scored 12 goals in 33 games in an injury blighted season.

On July 1, 2010, Reich returned to the Boston Bruins organization by signing a one-year contract. He was reassigned to Providence where he remained for the entire 2010–11 season, scoring 23 points in 72 games.

On April 30, 2011, Reich signed a one-year contract with German team, ERC Igolstadt, of the DEL.

== Career statistics ==
			Regular season					Playoffs
Season	Team	League	GP	G	A	Pts	PIM	GP	G	A	Pts	PIM
1994–95	Saskatoon Contacts	SMHL	35	13	20	33	81	—	—	—	—	—
1995–96	Seattle Thunderbirds	WHL	65	11	11	22	88	5	0	1	1	10
1996–97	Seattle Thunderbirds	WHL	62	19	31	50	134	15	2	5	7	36
1997–98	Seattle Thunderbirds	WHL	43	24	23	47	121	—	—	—	—	—
1997–98	Swift Current Broncos	WHL	22	8	8	16	47	12	5	6	11	37
1998–99	Swift Current Broncos	WHL	67	21	28	49	220	6	0	3	3	26
1999–00	Swift Current Broncos	WHL	72	33	58	91	167	12	2	10	12	19
2000–01	Syracuse Crunch	AHL	56	6	9	15	108	5	0	0	0	6
2001–02	Syracuse Crunch	AHL	59	9	7	16	178	10	4	0	4	16
2002–03	Syracuse Crunch	AHL	78	14	13	27	195	—	—	—	—	—
2003–04	Syracuse Crunch	AHL	72	14	37	51	150	6	1	1	2	13
2003–04	Columbus Blue Jackets	NHL	9	0	1	1	20	—	—	—	—	—
2004–05	Syracuse Crunch	AHL	50	4	5	9	189	—	—	—	—	—
2004–05	Houston Aeros	AHL	18	3	4	7	34	5	0	1	1	28
2005–06	Providence Bruins	AHL	77	8	15	23	235	6	0	0	0	27
2006–07	Providence Bruins	AHL	46	4	7	11	105	—	—	—	—	—
2006–07	Boston Bruins	NHL	32	0	1	1	63	—	—	—	—	—
2007–08	Boston Bruins	NHL	58	2	2	4	78	4	0	0	0	8
2008–09	Providence Bruins	AHL	76	21	13	34	139	16	3	5	8	21
2009–10	Bridgeport Sound Tigers	AHL	33	12	8	20	24	5	1	2	3	4
2010–11	Providence Bruins	AHL	72	14	9	23	52	—	—	—	—	—
2011–12	ERC Ingolstadt	DEL	41	2	11	13	117	9	0	3	3	16
AHL totals			637	104	132	236	1409	53	9	9	18	112
NHL totals			99	2	4	6	161	4	0	0	0	8

== Transactions ==
- December 20, 1997 - Traded from the Seattle Thunderbirds to the Swift Current Broncos in exchange for Jeffrey Beatch.
- March 10, 2005 - Loaned to the Houston Aeros from the Syracuse Crunch in exchange for the loan of Jason Beckett.
- September 7, 2005 - Signed as a free agent by the Boston Bruins.
- June 2, 2009 - Signed as a free agent by the New York Islanders.
- July 1, 2010 - Signed as a free agent by the Boston Bruins.
