= Bruce Graham (ice hockey) =

Canadian ice hockey player

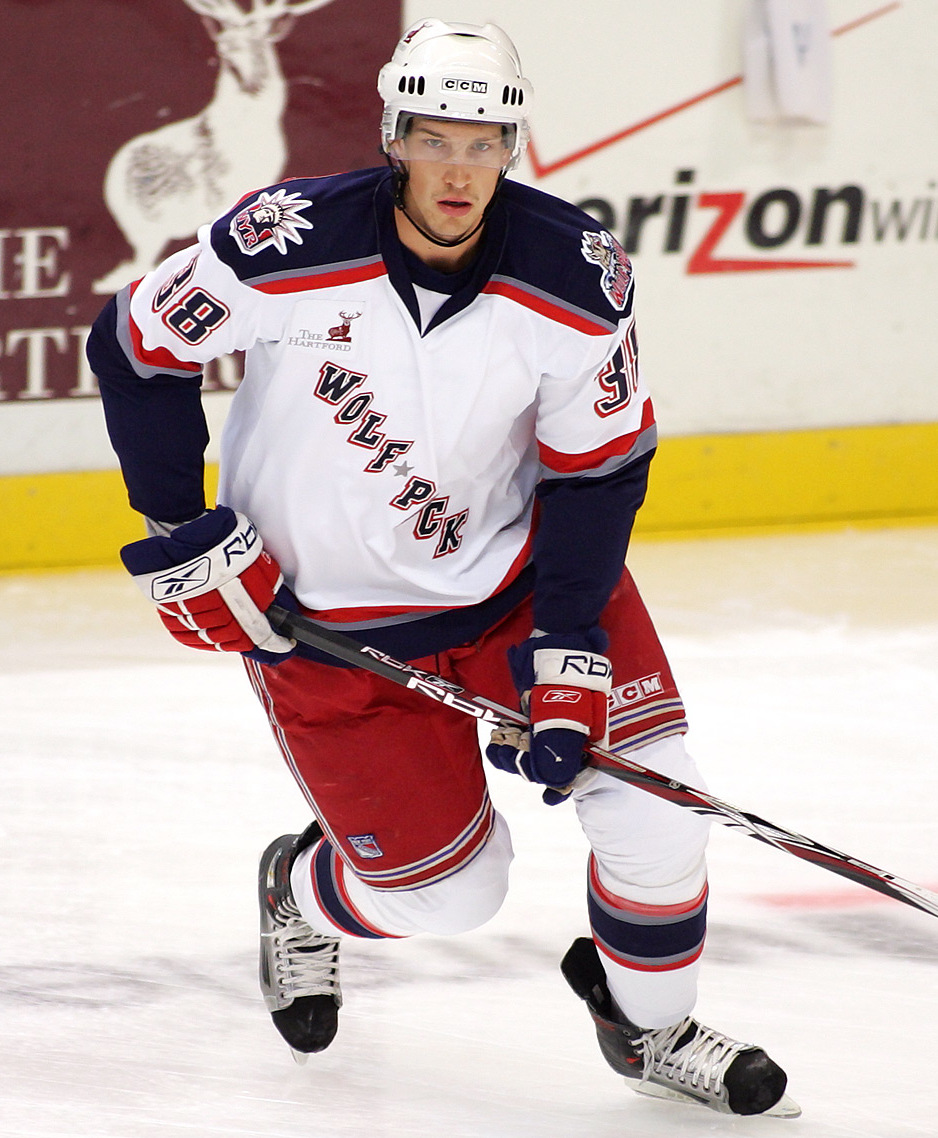
- Graham with the Hartford Wolf Pack during the 2007-08 season
- Born: December 2, 1985 (age 40) Moncton, New Brunswick, Canada
- Height: 6 ft 6 in (198 cm)
- Weight: 234 lb (106 kg; 16 st 10 lb)
- Position: Forward
- Shot: Left
- Played for: Hartford Wolf Pack; Lake Erie Monsters; Nottingham Panthers
- NHL draft: 51st overall, 2004; New York Rangers
- Playing career: 2005–2018

Bruce Graham (born December 2, 1985) is a Canadian former professional ice hockey forward who last played for the Nottingham Panthers in the Elite Ice Hockey League (EIHL).

== Playing career ==
Graham was drafted from the Moncton Wildcats of the Quebec Major Junior Hockey League to the New York Rangers, 51st overall in the 2004 NHL entry draft. With his large frame and after his major junior career he was signed to a three-year entry-level contract with the Rangers in time for the 2005-06 season with affiliate, the Hartford Wolf Pack of the American Hockey League. In his tenure within the Rangers organization, Graham was unable to establish himself and was released as a free agent after his contract.

Graham established himself within the Allen Americans in the 2009-10 season. He scored 79 points in 64 games and a leading 22 points in 20 post-season games. In his second season with the Americans, he was loaned to the Lake Erie Monsters of the AHL for two games.

On June 27, 2012, Graham left the Americans to sign abroad with British club, the Nottingham Panthers of the EIHL. In his debut season with the Panthers, Graham established himself as the top-line center with the Panthers and the league to contribute with 68 points in 56 games in winning the EIHL Championship. Graham then returned to Allen, Texas, for a fourth season and helped the defending champions, the Americans, defend and claim their second Ray Miron Cup.

Graham decided as a free agent to re-join the Panthers in England, signing a one-year contract on May 30, 2014.

== Career statistics ==
			Regular season					Playoffs
Season	Team	League	GP	G	A	Pts	PIM	GP	G	A	Pts	PIM
2001–02	Moncton Wildcats	QMJHL	3	0	0	0	0	—	—	—	—	—
2002–03	Moncton Wildcats	QMJHL	66	15	13	28	80	6	0	2	2	0
2003–04	Moncton Wildcats	QMJHL	68	24	33	57	89	18	0	14	14	4
2004–05	Moncton Wildcats	QMJHL	47	23	19	42	56	12	4	5	9	19
2005–06	Hartford Wolf Pack	AHL	25	2	5	7	15	—	—	—	—	—
2005–06	Charlotte Checkers	ECHL	23	6	12	18	40	2	0	0	0	0
2006–07	Charlotte Checkers	ECHL	65	33	23	56	83	5	1	2	3	8
2006–07	Hartford Wolf Pack	AHL	7	0	1	1	0	2	0	0	0	0
2007–08	Charlotte Checkers	ECHL	42	11	22	33	62	3	0	0	0	0
2007–08	Hartford Wolf Pack	AHL	24	1	5	6	6	—	—	—	—	—
2008–09	Gwinnett Gladiators	ECHL	29	10	10	20	43	—	—	—	—	—
2008–09	Bakersfield Condors	ECHL	43	17	15	32	27	7	1	0	1	19
2009–10	Allen Americans	CHL	64	31	48	79	75	20	9	13	22	40
2010–11	Allen Americans	CHL	57	34	39	73	52	13	4	4	8	14
2010–11	Lake Erie Monsters	AHL	2	0	0	0	0	—	—	—	—	—
2011–12	Allen Americans	CHL	48	26	36	62	61	6	5	2	7	2
2012–13	Nottingham Panthers	EIHL	56	37	31	68	57	4	3	3	6	0
2013–14	Tracadie Alpines	NESHL	20	47	60	107	100	—	—	—	—	—
2013–14	Allen Americans	CHL	15	6	15	21	10	17	6	9	15	28
2014–15	Nottingham Panthers	EIHL	47	16	22	38	60	2	0	1	1	2
2015–16	St–Quentin Castors	CRL	10	4	14	18	24	—	—	—	—	—
2016–17	Bouctouche JCs	NESHL	11	6	9	15	10	7	1	8	9	6
2017–18	Bouctouche JCs	NESHL	11	8	10	18	16	8	6	6	12	4
AHL totals			58	3	11	14	21	2	0	0	0	0
ECHL totals			202	77	82	159	255	17	2	2	4	27
CHL totals			184	97	138	235	198	55	24	28	52	84

== Awards and honours ==
Award	Year
EIHL First All-Star team	2012–13
