= Mike Egener =

Canadian ice hockey player

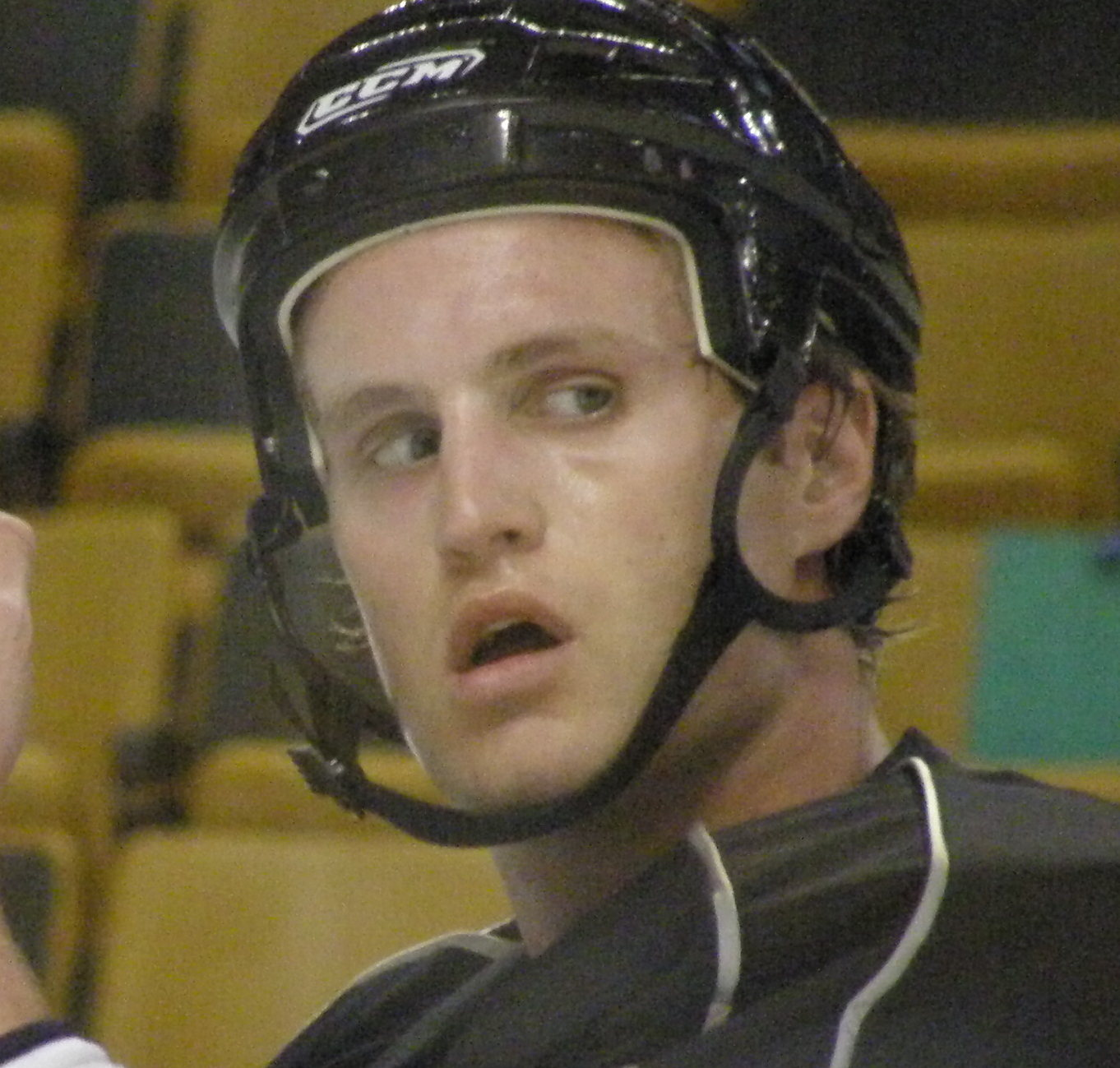
- Born: September 26, 1984 (age 41) Lahr, West Germany
- Height: 6 ft 4 in (193 cm)
- Weight: 216 lb (98 kg; 15 st 6 lb)
- Position: Defence
- Shot: Left
- Played for: Springfield Falcons; Johnstown Chiefs; Norfolk Admirals; Mississippi Sea Wolves; HC Vita Hästen; IF Björklöven; Ontario Reign; Florida Everblades; EfB Ishockey; Coventry Blaze
- NHL draft: 34th overall, 2003; Tampa Bay Lightning
- Playing career: 2004–2015

Mike Egener (born September 26, 1984) is a Canadian former professional ice hockey defenceman. He was drafted 34th overall by the Tampa Bay Lightning in the 2003 NHL entry draft after a four-year junior career with the Calgary Hitmen.

== Career statistics ==
=== Regular season and playoffs ===
			Regular season					Playoffs
Season	Team	League	GP	G	A	Pts	PIM	GP	G	A	Pts	PIM
2000–01	Calgary Hitmen	WHL	52	1	0	1	91	6	0	0	0	5
2001–02	Calgary Hitmen	WHL	68	2	7	9	175	6	0	0	0	23
2002–03	Calgary Hitmen	WHL	40	2	8	10	210	3	1	0	1	8
2003–04	Calgary Hitmen	WHL	64	1	16	17	228	7	1	1	2	47
2004–05	Springfield Falcons	AHL	45	3	2	5	183	—	—	—	—	—
2005–06	Springfield Falcons	AHL	38	2	1	3	142	—	—	—	—	—
2005–06	Johnstown Chiefs	ECHL	18	2	2	4	66	—	—	—	—	—
2006–07	Springfield Falcons	AHL	75	0	3	3	152	—	—	—	—	—
2007–08	Norfolk Admirals	AHL	17	1	2	3	28	—	—	—	—	—
2007–08	Mississippi Sea Wolves	ECHL	9	1	0	1	13	—	—	—	—	—
2008–09	HC Vita Hästen	SWE.3	8	1	3	4	22	—	—	—	—	—
2008–09	IF Björklöven	Allsv	6	0	0	0	22	—	—	—	—	—
2009–10	Ontario Reign	ECHL	65	11	18	29	189	—	—	—	—	—
2010–11	Florida Everblades	ECHL	44	2	6	8	147	—	—	—	—	—
2011–12	EfB Ishockey	DEN	33	1	9	10	235	4	0	1	1	6
2012–13	Coventry Blaze	EIHL	50	3	10	13	121	4	0	3	3	8
2013–14	Coventry Blaze	EIHL	37	3	7	10	85	2	0	0	0	4
2014–15	Coventry Blaze	EIHL	33	2	5	7	64	4	0	1	1	4
AHL totals			175	6	8	14	505	—	—	—	—	—
ECHL totals			136	16	26	42	415	—	—	—	—	—
EIHL totals			120	8	22	30	270	10	0	4	4	16

=== International ===
Year	Team	Event	GP	G	A	Pts	PIM
2002	Canada	WJC18	8	0	0	0	24
Junior totals			8	0	0	0	24
