= Mike Wirll =

Canadian ice hockey player

- Born: February 24, 1982 (age 43) Regina, Saskatchewan, Canada
- Height: 5 ft 10 in (178 cm)
- Weight: 205 lb (93 kg; 14 st 9 lb)
- Position: Right wing
- Shot: Right
- Played for: Charlotte Checkers; Victoria Salmon Kings; JYP Jyväskylä; Utah Grizzlies; Pensacola Ice Pilots; Cincinnati Cyclones; Mississippi Sea Wolves; Bakersfield Condors; Braehead Clan; Dundee Stars
- Playing career: 2003–2014

Mike Wirll (born February 28, 1982) is a Canadian former professional ice hockey right winger.

Wirll spent the majority of his career playing for several teams in the ECHL. He also played in the SM-liiga in Finland for JYP Jyväskylä and in the Elite Ice Hockey League in the United Kingdom for Scottish teams the Braehead Clan and the Dundee Stars.

== Career statistics ==
			Regular season					Playoffs
Season	Team	League	GP	G	A	Pts	PIM	GP	G	A	Pts	PIM
1997–98	Brandon Wheat Kings	WHL	9	2	1	3	0	3	0	0	0	0
1998–99	Brandon Wheat Kings	WHL	44	16	21	37	12	5	0	1	1	2
1999–00	Brandon Wheat Kings	WHL	37	9	18	27	16	—	—	—	—	—
2000–01	Brandon Wheat Kings	WHL	2	0	0	0	4	—	—	—	—	—
2000–01	Prince Albert Raiders	WHL	29	5	6	11	6	—	—	—	—	—
2001–02	Prince George Cougars	WHL	25	14	19	33	14	7	2	4	6	6
2001–02	Prince Albert Raiders	WHL	47	18	31	49	24	—	—	—	—	—
2002–03	Prince George Cougars	WHL	10	3	7	10	16	—	—	—	—	—
2002–03	Lethbridge Hurricanes	WHL	59	34	46	80	26	—	—	—	—	—
2002–03	Bakersfield Condors	WCHL	5	1	0	1	2	5	0	1	1	2
2003–04	Charlotte Checkers	ECHL	49	11	18	29	22	—	—	—	—	—
2003–04	Jacksonville Barracudas	WHA2	17	10	7	17	12	5	3	3	6	0
2004–05	Jacksonville Barracudas	SPHL	6	5	3	8	4	—	—	—	—	—
2004–05	Charlotte Checkers	ECHL	54	18	24	42	24	—	—	—	—	—
2005–06	Victoria Salmon Kings	ECHL	39	11	28	39	26	—	—	—	—	—
2005–06	JYP Jyväskylä	Liiga	10	0	1	1	20	2	0	0	0	0
2006–07	Utah Grizzlies	ECHL	13	6	3	9	16	—	—	—	—	—
2006–07	Pensacola Ice Pilots	ECHL	34	25	16	41	34	—	—	—	—	—
2006–07	Cincinnati Cyclones	ECHL	26	16	10	26	22	10	4	6	10	10
2007–08	Eisbären Regensburg	Germany2	44	14	18	32	62	—	—	—	—	—
2008–09	Mississippi Sea Wolves	ECHL	14	2	9	11	12	—	—	—	—	—
2008–09	Bakersfield Condors	ECHL	43	22	29	51	34	7	0	1	1	2
2009–10	Gislaveds SK	Division 1	18	19	12	31	16	—	—	—	—	—
2010–11	Skövde IK	Division 1	7	3	1	4	2	—	—	—	—	—
2010–11	Tulsa Oilers	CHL	23	8	12	20	6	—	—	—	—	—
2011–12	Carstairs Redhawks	Chinook HL	6	0	2	2	4	—	—	—	—	—
2011–12	Braehead Clan	EIHL	20	4	13	17	22	2	1	0	1	0
2012–13	Dundee Stars	EIHL	52	31	36	67	24	—	—	—	—	—
2013–14	Dundee Stars	EIHL	35	12	17	29	12	2	0	0	0	0
2014–15	Innisfail Eagles	Chinook HL	17	9	14	23	8	3	0	0	0	0
2016–17	Lacombe Generals	Chinook HL	8	3	4	7	20	—	—	—	—	—
2017–18	Lethbridge Lightning	RHL	6	0	0	0	0	—	—	—	—	—
2018–19	Lethbridge Lightning	RHL	1	0	0	0	0	—	—	—	—	—
ECHL totals			272	111	137	248	190	17	4	7	11	12
