= Chris Blight =

Canadian ice hockey player

- Born: October 14, 1982 (age 43) Cambridge, Ontario, CAN
- Height: 6 ft 0 in (183 cm)
- Weight: 190 lb (86 kg; 13 st 8 lb)
- Position: Right Wing
- Shoots: Right
- EIHL team Former teams: Dundee Stars; Worcester Sharks; Manitoba Moose; Wilkes-Barre/Scranton Penguins; Albany River Rats; Nordsjaelland Cobras; Ravensburg Towerstars; Bridgeport Sound Tigers; Hershey Bears; Portland Pirates; Ritten Renon; Cardiff Devils; Sheffield Steelers
- NHL draft: Undrafted
- Playing career: 2005–present

Chris Blight (born October 14, 1982) is a Canadian professional ice hockey right winger who last played for the Dundee Stars of Elite Ice Hockey League.

== Playing career ==
Blight played four-years of hockey for Clarkson University of the NCAA starting in 2001. He was ranked 156th in the NHL draft by NHL central scouting for the 2002 draft. After college hockey he signed with the Toledo Storm of the ECHL as an undrafted free agent. A prolific scoring career in the ECHL allowed him to be signed by many AHL teams during his four-year career in North America. He was signed by the Reading Royals on 4 October 2010.

On 25 July 2011, Blight signed with Ritten Renon of Italy's Serie A. On 8 June 2012, Blight moved to the United Kingdom to sign with the Cardiff Devils of the EIHL. where he played in the 2013–14 season. In the 2014–15 season, Blight played for the EIHL Gardiner Conference Champions Dundee Stars.

== Career statistics ==
			Regular season					Playoffs
Season	Team	League	GP	G	A	Pts	PIM	GP	G	A	Pts	PIM
2001–02	Clarkson University	ECAC	36	8	12	20	14	—	—	—	—	—
2002–03	Clarkson University	ECAC	30	7	6	13	22	—	—	—	—	—
2003–04	Clarkson University	ECAC	41	19	20	39	30	—	—	—	—	—
2004–05	Clarkson University	ECAC	37	6	18	24	42	—	—	—	—	—
2005–06	Toledo Storm	ECHL	65	29	32	61	52	13	4	8	12	18
2006–07	Toledo Storm	ECHL	71	26	28	54	105	3	0	1	1	4
2006–07	Worcester Sharks	AHL	—	—	—	—	—	1	0	0	0	0
2007–08	Reading Royals	ECHL	40	21	18	39	58	13	4	4	8	16
2007–08	Manitoba Moose	AHL	11	0	2	2	4	—	—	—	—	—
2007–08	Wilkes-Barre/Scranton Penguins	AHL	1	0	0	0	0	—	—	—	—	—
2007–08	Albany River Rats	AHL	20	0	5	5	17	—	—	—	—	—
2008–09	Nordsjaelland Cobras	DEN	39	12	18	30	109	—	—	—	—	—
2008–09	Ravensburg Towerstars	2.GBun	9	8	4	12	14	11	3	7	10	49
2009–10	Ravensburg Towerstars	2.GBun	7	2	2	4	4	—	—	—	—	—
2010–11	Reading Royals	ECHL	46	25	34	59	52	8	2	2	4	6
2010–11	Bridgeport Sound Tigers	AHL	13	1	3	4	2	—	—	—	—	—
2010–11	Worcester Sharks	AHL	1	0	2	2	0	—	—	—	—	—
2010–11	Hershey Bears	AHL	5	0	1	1	2	—	—	—	—	—
2010–11	Portland Pirates	AHL	1	0	0	0	0	—	—	—	—	—
2011–12	Ritten-Renon	ITL	43	22	17	39	40	—	—	—	—	—
2012–13	Cardiff Devils	EIHL	59	21	54	75	58	4	7	8	15	0
2013–14	Cardiff Devils	EIHL	38	7	33	40	35	—	—	—	—	—
2013–14	Sheffield Steelers	EIHL	19	5	11	16	9	4	0	3	3	4
ECHL totals			222	101	112	213	267	37	10	15	25	44
AHL totals			52	1	13	14	25	1	0	0	0	0
