= Sami Ryhänen =

Finnish ice hockey player

- Born: May 23, 1980 (age 45) Helsinki, FIN
- Height: 5 ft 10 in (178 cm)
- Weight: 183 lb (83 kg; 13 st 1 lb)
- Position: Centre
- Shot: Left
- Played for: Lukko; SaiPa; Blues; Tappara; HDD Olimpija Ljubljana; Ritten/Renon; AaB Ishockey; Nottingham Panthers; Ducs de Dijon; Dundee Stars; ESV Kaufbeuren; HC Fassa; Swindon Wildcats; Imatran Ketterä; Porvoo Hunters
- Playing career: 2000–2017

Sami Ryhänen (born May 23, 1980) is a retired Finnish professional ice hockey centre. He played in the Finnish SM-liiga (the Finnish Elite League) for Lukko, SaiPa, Blues and Tappara.

He last played for Porvoo Hunters, who he would later coach between 2018 and 2019.

== Career statistics ==
			Regular season					Playoffs
Season	Team	League	GP	G	A	Pts	PIM	GP	G	A	Pts	PIM
1995–96	HIFK U16	U16 SM-sarja	29	22	30	52	38	—	—	—	—	—
1996–97	HIFK U18	U18 SM-sarja	14	1	6	7	10	3	0	0	0	2
1997–98	HIFK U18	U18 SM-sarja	35	14	31	45	36	—	—	—	—	—
1997–98	HIFK U20	U20 SM-liiga	2	1	0	1	0	—	—	—	—	—
1998–99	HIFK U20	U20 SM-liiga	18	4	5	9	8	—	—	—	—	—
1999–00	Espoo Blues U20	U20 SM-liiga	37	13	27	40	28	4	3	9	12	2
2000–01	UJK	Mestis	13	0	1	1	2	—	—	—	—	—
2000–01	Étoile Noire de Strasbourg	France2	14	21	14	35	6	—	—	—	—	—
2001–02	KJT	Mestis	28	2	5	7	10	—	—	—	—	—
2002–03	Hockey Clermont Communauté Auvergne	France	22	16	15	31	24	—	—	—	—	—
2003–04	Halmstad Hammers HC	Allsvenskan	46	9	18	27	20	—	—	—	—	—
2004–05	Team Uppsala	Allsvenskan	31	9	18	27	14	—	—	—	—	—
2004–05	Stjernen Hockey	Norway	17	2	5	7	8	7	0	4	4	2
2005–06	HC Salamat	Mestis	27	10	28	38	22	—	—	—	—	—
2005–06	Lukko	SM-liiga	22	4	8	12	8	—	—	—	—	—
2006–07	SaiPa	SM-liiga	56	13	26	39	34	—	—	—	—	—
2007–08	SaiPa	SM-liiga	28	7	6	13	14	—	—	—	—	—
2007–08	HC Innsbruck	EBEL	—	—	—	—	—	—	—	—	—	—
2007–08	IF Björklöven	HockeyAllsvenskan	12	6	8	14	14	1	0	0	0	0
2008–09	Espoo Blues	SM-liiga	43	10	17	27	14	—	—	—	—	—
2008–09	Tappara	SM-liiga	10	1	6	7	6	—	—	—	—	—
2009–10	Tappara	SM-liiga	6	0	2	2	2	—	—	—	—	—
2009–10	LeKi	Mestis	10	3	7	10	12	8	1	5	6	2
2010–11	HK Olimpija	EBEL	13	1	8	9	8	—	—	—	—	—
2010–11	Almtuna IS	HockeyAllsvenskan	11	0	3	3	0	—	—	—	—	—
2010–11	Ritten Sport	Italy	3	2	2	4	2	5	0	6	6	4
2011–12	AaB Ishockey	Denmark	13	1	4	5	28	—	—	—	—	—
2011–12	Nottingham Panthers	EIHL	26	5	26	31	10	4	2	1	3	6
2012–13	Dundee Stars	EIHL	51	26	60	86	44	—	—	—	—	—
2013–14	ESV Kaufbeuren	DEL2	54	7	52	59	28	—	—	—	—	—
2014–15	HC Fassa	Italy	37	13	30	43	36	—	—	—	—	—
2015–16	Swindon Wildcats	EPIHL	13	3	19	22	18	—	—	—	—	—
2015–16	Imatran Ketterä	Suomi-sarja	11	3	10	13	14	5	2	7	9	2
2016–17	Porvoo Hunters	Suomi-sarja	7	1	11	12	2	3	0	3	3	2
SM-liiga totals			165	35	65	100	78	3	0	1	1	2
Mestis totals			78	15	41	56	46	8	1	5	6	2
EIHL totals			77	31	86	117	54	4	2	1	3	6
Allsvenskan totals			77	18	36	54	34	—	—	—	—	—
