= David Ling =

Canadian ice hockey player (born 1975)

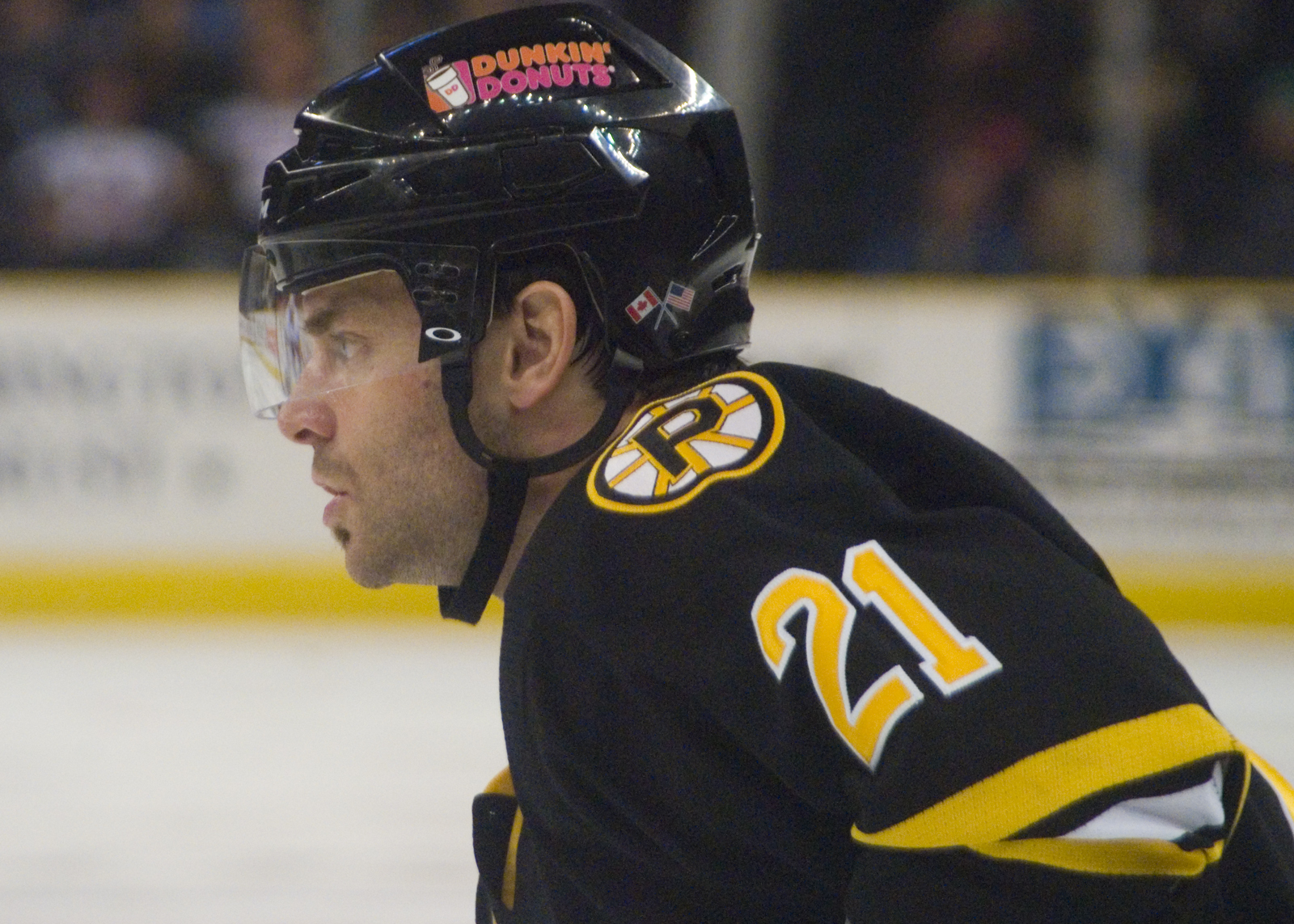
- Born: January 9, 1975 (age 51) Halifax, Nova Scotia, Canada
- Height: 5 ft 9 in (175 cm)
- Weight: 185 lb (84 kg; 13 st 3 lb)
- Position: Right wing
- Shot: Right
- Played for: Montreal Canadiens; Columbus Blue Jackets; Spartak Moscow; Dynamo Moscow; EHC Biel; Jokerit; Amur Khabarovsk; Val Pusteria HC; Nottingham Panthers; St. John's Maple Leafs; Toronto Marlies; Brampton Beast
- NHL draft: 179th overall, 1993; Quebec Nordiques
- Playing career: 1995–2018

David Gregory Ling (born January 9, 1975) is a Canadian former professional ice hockey forward. Ling was selected by the Quebec Nordiques in the 7th round (179th overall) of the 1993 NHL entry draft.

== Playing career ==
=== Junior ===
Ling played with the Charlottetown Abbies for three seasons (starting at age 14) and in his third season the MRJHL as a 17-year-old in 1991–92, as he scored 33 goals, 75 points and 270 PIM in only 30 games. Ling also played eight games with the St. Michael's Buzzers of the OHA, earning 19 points.

Ling was drafted in the second round (18th overall) by the Kingston Frontenacs of the Ontario Hockey League. Ling made his OHL debut during the 1992–93 season, as he had 17 goals, 63 points and 275 PIM in 64 games with the Kingston Frontenacs and was voted onto the second all rookie team. Ling had a solid playoffs with Kingston, as he had 15 points in 16 games, helping the club to the third round of the post-season.

In the 1993–94 season, Ling improved his numbers, scoring 37 goals and 77 points in 61 games, as well as accumulating 254 PIM (led the league in PIMs). Ling then chipped in with six points in six playoff games for the Frontenacs.

Ling saw his numbers explode during the 1994–95, as he finished second in the league with 135 points, as he scored an OHL high 61 goals, along with 74 assists, helping lead the Frontenacs to best record in the East Division. Ling continued his dominance in the playoffs, scoring seven goals and 15 points in only six games despite playing with a broken thumb. In spite of his efforts, the Frontenacs were upset in the first round. Ling was awarded the Red Tilson Trophy, awarded to the most outstanding player in the OHL, the Jim Mahon Memorial Trophy, which is awarded to the highest scoring right winger in the OHL, as well as CHL Player of the Year.

Ling would eventually see his number 17 raised to the rafters, as the Frontenacs honoured his number.

=== Professional ===
==== Quebec Nordiques ====
Ling was drafted by the Quebec Nordiques in the seventh round, 179th overall in the 1993 NHL entry draft.

On June 21, 1995, Ling would have his rights transferred to the Colorado Avalanche as the Nordiques relocated to Denver, Colorado to begin play in 1995–96. He would not stay in Colorado for very long, as on July 7, 1995, the Avalanche traded Ling and Colorado's ninth round draft pick in the 1995 NHL entry draft to the Calgary Flames for the Flames' ninth round draft pick in the same draft.

==== Calgary Flames ====
Ling made his professional hockey debut with the Saint John Flames of the American Hockey League (AHL) during the 1995–96 season, scoring 24 goals and 56 points in 75 games with Saint John, while registering 179 PIM. Ling then appeared in nine playoff games for Saint John, earning five assists.

He began the 1996–97 season with Saint John once again, however, Ling appeared in only five games, getting two assists. On October 24, 1996, Calgary traded Ling and the Flames' sixth round draft pick in the 1998 NHL entry draft to the Montreal Canadiens for Scott Fraser.

==== Montreal Canadiens ====
Ling would continue the 1996–97 season with the Fredericton Canadiens of the AHL, where he scored 22 goals, 58 points and 240 PIM in 48 games. Ling also made his National Hockey League debut during the season, going pointless in two games with the Montreal Canadiens.

Ling began the 1997–98 season with Fredericton once again, where in 67 games, he had 25 goals and 66 points. Ling also appeared in one game with Montreal, where he did not earn a point.

On March 14, 1998, the Canadiens traded Ling to the Chicago Blackhawks for Martin Gendron.

==== Chicago Blackhawks ====
Ling finished out the 1997–98 season with the Indianapolis Ice of the International Hockey League (IHL), where he had 14 points in 12 games, then earning five points in five playoff games.

On September 3, 1998, Ling signed with the Kansas City Blades of the IHL, however, the Blackhawks retained his NHL rights. He had a very solid 1998–99 season in Kansas City, scoring 30 goals and 72 points in 82 games, however, he recorded only a goal in three playoff games with the Blades.

Ling returned to Kansas City for the 1999–2000 season, as he had an even better season with the Blades, recording 35 goals and 83 points in 82 games.

On August 11, 2000, the Blackhawks traded Ling to the Dallas Stars for future considerations.

==== Dallas Stars ====
Ling was sent to the Dallas Stars' IHL affiliate for the 2000–01 season, where he struggled offensively, as his numbers dropped to 15 goals and 43 points in 79 games with the Utah Grizzlies.

On July 7, 2001, Ling left the Stars as a free agent, as he signed with the Columbus Blue Jackets.

==== Columbus Blue Jackets ====
Ling spent most of the 2001–02 season with the Blue Jackets' AHL affiliate, the Syracuse Crunch, where he had 19 goals and 60 points in 71 games. In the playoffs, he had 10 points in 10 games. Ling also returned to the NHL in 2001–02, where he played in five games with the Columbus Blue Jackets, earning no points while having seven minutes in penalties.

Ling played a majority of the 2002–03 season with Syracuse, as he had 41 points in 46 games. He was then called up to Columbus, where he finished the season with the Blue Jackets, earning five points in 35 games.

The 2003–04 season was spent mostly in Columbus, where Ling appeared in 50 games, earning three points and 98 PIM. Ling also appeared in 14 games with Syracuse, where he had seven goals and 17 points, before adding an assist in seven playoff games.

On July 29, 2004, Ling signed with the St. John's Maple Leafs as a free agent.

==== Toronto Maple Leafs ====
With the 2004–05 NHL lockout cancelling the NHL season, Ling spent the entire season with the St. John's Maple Leafs of the AHL, where he had 28 goals and 88 points in 80 games good for third in the AHL scoring race behind only Mike Cammalleri and Jason Spezza. Ling then added two points and 43 PIM in five playoff games.

Ling left the Maple Leafs organization after only one season, as he signed with Spartak Moscow of the Russian Super League (RSL).

==== Russian Super League ====
Ling played the 2005–06 season with Spartak Moscow of the RSL, where he led the team with 15 goals and 32 points in 50 games. He then added two goals and three points in three playoff games.

In 2006–07, Ling moved to HC Dynamo Moscow, where he had 26 points in 42 games, followed by three points in three playoff games.

==== Toronto Maple Leafs ====
Ling returned to North America on July 9, 2007, when he signed with the Toronto Maple Leafs once again.

He spent the entire 2007–08 season with the Toronto Marlies of the AHL, where he scored 17 goals and 59 points in 71 games. Ling had a solid playoff run with the Marlies, earning 14 points in 17 games.

==== Europe ====
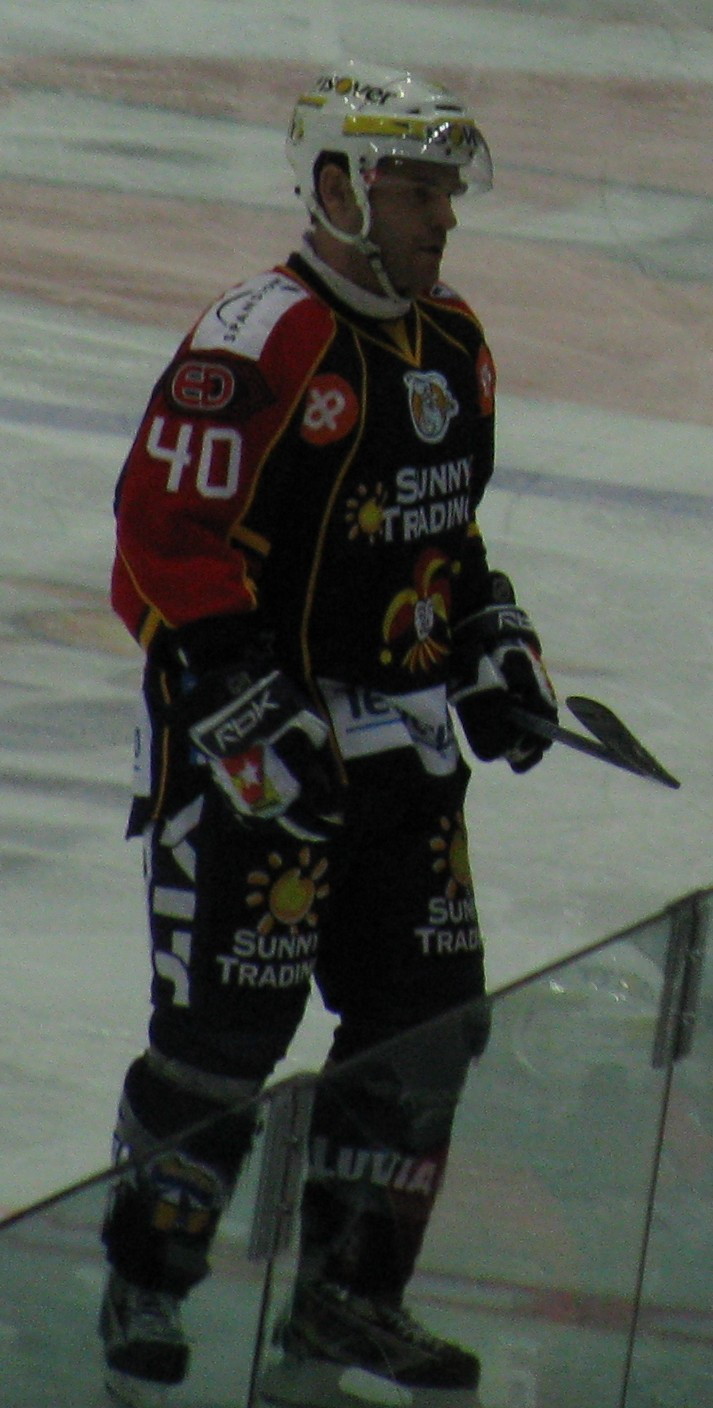
David Ling playing for Jokerit in 2009.

Ling left for Europe for the 2008–09 season, as he played for EHC Biel of National League A, where he had 22 points in 33 games. Ling then moved to Jokerit of the SM-liiga, as he earned 13 points in 23 games. He played for Jokerit in the playoffs, earning three points in five games.

===== KHL =====
Ling returned to Russia and played for two seasons with the KHL team Amur Khabarovsk. He led the team in scoring the first year and mid way thru the 2010-2011 year he returned to the AHL with the Boston Bruins farm the Providence Bruins.

===== Europe =====
Ling returned to Europe and headed to Italy with HC Pustertal and led the Italian league in scoring in 2011–12. The 2012–13 season saw Ling head to England and won the triple with the Nottingham Panthers of the EIHL. Ling took away the league MVP and top scorer that year, he also earned his MBA at Derby University. Ling didn't start playing the 2013–14 season until January, where he went back to Italy, again with HC Pustertal and put impressive numbers in the remaining games and into the playoffs.

===== ECHL =====
Ling returned to North America for the 2014–15 season with the Brampton Beast of the ECHL at 40 years old. He was called up the Edmonton Oilers farm team, Oklahoma Barons of the AHL, where he scored 1 goal in 3 games.

===== Europe =====
Ling headed back to England to start the season with the Nottingham Panthers before returning to the ECHL and Brampton Beast in January 2016.

===== ECHL =====
Ling played his final two seasons (2016–2018) of professional hockey in the ECHL with the Brampton Beast. He was the second oldest active professional player behind Jaromir Jagr. Ling never formally retired but didn't play another professional game after 2018, but he played senior hockey with the Hamilton Steelhawks in search of an Allan Cup.

== Personal ==
Ling's brother, Jamie, played seven years of professional hockey. In 2015 Ling was accused of domestic violence and grand theft, the charges were later dropped.

== Career statistics ==
			Regular season					Playoffs
Season	Team	League	GP	G	A	Pts	PIM	GP	G	A	Pts	PIM
1991–92	Charlottetown Abbies	MJHL	30	33	42	75	270	—	—	—	—	—
1991–92	St. Michael's Buzzers	MetJHL	8	5	14	19	25	—	—	—	—	—
1992–93	Kingston Frontenacs	OHL	64	17	46	63	275	16	3	12	15	72
1993–94	Kingston Frontenacs	OHL	61	37	40	77	254	6	4	2	6	16
1994–95	Kingston Frontenacs	OHL	62	61	74	135	136	6	7	8	15	12
1995–96	Saint John Flames	AHL	75	24	32	56	179	9	0	5	5	12
1996–97	Saint John Flames	AHL	5	0	2	2	19	—	—	—	—	—
1996–97	Fredericton Canadiens	AHL	48	22	36	58	229	—	—	—	—	—
1996–97	Montreal Canadiens	NHL	2	0	0	0	0	—	—	—	—	—
1997–98	Fredericton Canadiens	AHL	67	25	41	66	148	—	—	—	—	—
1997–98	Indianapolis Ice	IHL	12	8	6	14	30	5	4	1	5	31
1997–98	Montreal Canadiens	NHL	1	0	0	0	0	—	—	—	—	—
1998–99	Kansas City Blades	IHL	82	30	42	72	112	3	1	0	1	20
1999–2000	Kansas City Blades	IHL	82	35	48	83	210	—	—	—	—	—
2000–01	Utah Grizzlies	IHL	79	15	28	43	202	—	—	—	—	—
2001–02	Syracuse Crunch	AHL	71	19	41	60	240	10	5	5	10	16
2001–02	Columbus Blue Jackets	NHL	5	0	0	0	7	—	—	—	—	—
2002–03	Syracuse Crunch	AHL	46	7	34	41	129	—	—	—	—	—
2002–03	Columbus Blue Jackets	NHL	35	3	2	5	86	—	—	—	—	—
2003–04	Syracuse Crunch	AHL	14	7	10	17	25	7	0	1	1	36
2003–04	Columbus Blue Jackets	NHL	50	1	2	3	98	—	—	—	—	—
2004–05	St. John's Maple Leafs	AHL	80	28	60	88	152	5	1	1	2	43
2005–06	Spartak Moscow	RSL	50	15	17	32	40	3	2	1	3	4
2006–07	Dynamo Moscow	RSL	42	10	16	26	91	3	1	2	3	4
2007–08	Toronto Marlies	AHL	71	17	42	59	179	17	3	11	14	18
2008–09	EHC Biel	NLA	33	9	16	25	22	—	—	—	—	—
2008–09	Jokerit	SM-l	23	3	10	13	72	5	1	2	3	27
2009–10	Amur Khabarovsk	KHL	46	8	24	32	76	—	—	—	—	—
2010–11	Amur Khabarovsk	KHL	18	1	6	7	14	—	—	—	—	—
2010–11	Providence Bruins	AHL	56	8	15	23	55	—	—	—	—	—
2011–12	Val Pusteria HC	ITA	35	22	44	66	74	13	5	17	22	30
2012–13	Nottingham Panthers	EIHL	57	35	60	95	144	4	2	4	6	8
2013–14	Eastlink Cee Bee Stars	NLSHL	6	4	7	11	12	—	—	—	—	—
2013–14	Val Pusteria HC	ITA	14	1	15	16	50	16	4	18	22	30
2014–15	Brampton Beast	ECHL	46	9	32	41	89	—	—	—	—	—
2014–15	Oklahoma City Barons	AHL	3	1	0	1	2	—	—	—	—	—
2015–16	Nottingham Panthers	EIHL	34	14	32	46	83	—	—	—	—	—
2015–16	Brampton Beast	ECHL	26	5	12	17	47	—	—	—	—	—
2016–17	Stoney Creek Generals	ACH	5	2	4	6	2	—	—	—	—	—
2016–17	Brampton Beast	ECHL	39	9	11	20	36	10	1	1	2	4
2017–18	Hamilton Steelhawks	ACH	7	1	4	5	22	—	—	—	—	—
2017–18	Brampton Beast	ECHL	12	1	7	8	4	—	—	—	—	—
AHL totals			536	158	313	471	1357	48	9	23	32	125
NHL totals			93	4	4	8	191	—	—	—	—	—
IHL totals			255	88	124	212	554	8	5	1	6	51

== Awards and honours ==
Award	Year
OHL
First All-Star Team	1995
Red Tilson Trophy	1995
Jim Mahon Memorial Trophy	1995
CHL First All-Star Team	1995
CHL Player of the Year	1995
AHL
All-Star Game	1996
IHL
First All-Star Team	2000
EIHL
First All-Star team	2013
Forward of the Year	2013
Player of the Year	2013

Awards and achievements
Preceded by Jason Allison	CHL Player of the Year; 1995	Succeeded by Christian Dubé
