= Shea Guthrie =

Canadian ice hockey player

- Born: July 30, 1987 (age 38) Carleton Place, Ontario, Canada
- Height: 6 ft 0 in (183 cm)
- Weight: 204 lb (93 kg; 14 st 8 lb)
- Position: Centre
- Shot: Right
- EIHL team Former teams: Coventry Blaze; ECHL; Utah Grizzlies; Florida Everblades
- NHL draft: 76th overall, 2005; New York Islanders
- Playing career: 2005–2014

Shea Guthrie (born July 30, 1987) is a Canadian Ice hockey forward, currently playing for the Coventry Blaze of the Elite Ice Hockey League (EIHL).

He was selected 76th overall in the 2005 NHL entry draft by the New York Islanders.

== Playing career ==
Guthrie was born in Carleton Place, Ontario, Canada. He started his career in 2005 playing for four seasons at Clarkson University before moving to the ECHL in 2009 with the Utah Grizzlies and Florida Everblades.

On June 21, 2011 it was announced that Guthrie would be joining the Coventry Blaze of the British Elite Ice Hockey League.

On April 9, 2013 it was confirmed that Guthrie would be joining IF Troja/Ljungby of the HockeyAllsvenskan.

On November 15, 2013 it was announced that Guthrie would be returning to Coventry Blaze.

== Career statistics ==
			Regular season					Playoffs
Season	Team	League	GP	G	A	Pts	PIM	GP	G	A	Pts	PIM
2002–03	St. George's School	HS-Prep		31	29	60		—	—	—	—	—
2003–04	St. George's School	HS-Prep		35	33	68		—	—	—	—	—
2004–05	St. George's School	HS-Prep	20	26	24	50		—	—	—	—	—
2005–06	Clarkson University	ECAC	33	9	17	26	60	—	—	—	—	—
2006–07	Clarkson University	ECAC	36	8	23	31	30	—	—	—	—	—
2007–08	Clarkson University	ECAC	38	9	13	22	20	—	—	—	—	—
2008–09	Clarkson University	ECAC	30	13	14	27	28	—	—	—	—	—
2009–10	Utah Grizzlies	ECHL	22	7	6	13	26	—	—	—	—	—
2009–10	Florida Everblades	ECHL	33	11	13	24	34	8	1	3	4	2
2010–11	Florida Everblades	ECHL	1	0	0	0	0	—	—	—	—	—
2010–11	Utah Grizzlies	ECHL	13	0	3	3	16	8	0	1	1	6
2011–12	Coventry Blaze	EIHL	53	29	51	80	48	2	0	2	2	0
2012–13	Coventry Blaze	EIHL	42	16	25	41	45	4	6	4	10	6
2013–14	IF Troja/Ljungby	Allsv	17	0	4	4	16	—	—	—	—	—
2013–14	Coventry Blaze	EIHL	34	8	18	26	46	—	—	—	—	—
ECHL totals			69	18	22	40	76	16	1	4	5	8
EIHL totals			129	53	94	147	139	6	6	6	12	6

== Awards and honours ==
Award	Year
All-ECAC Hockey Rookie Team	2005–06
NCAA (ECAC) Championship	2006-07
EIHL First All-Star team	2011–12
