= Gerad Adams =

Canadian ice hockey player and coach

- Born: May 3, 1978 (age 46); Regina, Saskatchewan, Canada
- Height: 5 ft 11 in (180 cm)
- Weight: 203 lb (92 kg; 14 st 7 lb)
- Position: Defence
- Shot: Left
- Played for: Portland Pirates; Hampton Roads Admirals; Richmond Renegades; Edinburgh Capitals; London Knights; Sheffield Steelers; Cardiff Devils
- Playing career: 1999–2014

Gerad Adams (born May 3, 1978) is a Canadian professional ice hockey defenceman who was previously the coach of the Sheffield Steelers of the Elite Ice Hockey League.

== Career statistics ==
			Regular season					Playoffs
Season	Team	League	GP	G	A	Pts	PIM	GP	G	A	Pts	PIM
1995–96	Regina Pats	WHL	70	1	11	12	252	11	1	1	2	40
1996–97	Regina Pats	WHL	65	5	21	26	227	5	1	2	3	12
1997–98	Regina Pats	WHL	69	10	32	42	202	9	3	3	6	32
1998–99	Regina Pats	WHL	42	16	20	36	136	—	—	—	—	—
1998–99	Kelowna Rockets	WHL	15	6	10	16	28	6	1	1	2	6
1998–99	Portland Pirates	AHL	3	0	0	0	4	—	—	—	—	—
1999–00	Portland Pirates	AHL	8	0	0	0	10	—	—	—	—	—
1999–00	Hampton Roads Admirals	ECHL	58	3	11	14	165	10	0	2	2	35
2000–01	Portland Pirates	AHL	4	0	0	0	2	—	—	—	—	—
2000–01	Richmond Renegades	ECHL	48	4	16	20	120	1	0	0	0	4
2001–02	Edinburgh Capitals	BNL	17	6	4	10	99	—	—	—	—	—
2001–02	London Knights	BISL	21	2	1	3	92	7	3	2	5	10
2002–03	London Knights	BISL	28	2	7	9	84	18	2	8	10	26
2003–04	Sheffield Steelers	EIHL	53	16	29	45	190	6	1	0	1	6
2004–05	Sheffield Steelers	EIHL	32	5	12	17	50	10	2	0	2	8
2005–06	Cardiff Devils	EIHL	33	11	8	19	64	7	2	1	3	24
2006–07	Cardiff Devils	EIHL	50	6	12	18	123	4	1	0	1	2
2007–08	Cardiff Devils	EIHL	48	7	8	15	82	3	0	1	1	10
2008–09	Cardiff Devils	EIHL	15	1	0	1	13	3	0	0	0	0
2009–10	Cardiff Devils	EIHL	38	4	11	15	58	—	—	—	—	—
2010–11	Cardiff Devils	EIHL	54	6	11	17	76	4	0	1	1	2
2011–12	Cardiff Devils	EIHL	51	6	11	17	51	4	1	1	2	4
2012–13	Cardiff Devils	EIHL	52	3	11	14	37	4	1	4	5	14
2013–14	Cardiff Devils	EIHL	9	0	1	1	6	—	—	—	—	—
EIHL totals			435	65	114	179	750	45	8	8	16	70
