= Casey Haines =

American ice hockey player

- Born: August 23, 1986 (age 39) Indiana, Pennsylvania, U.S.
- Height: 5 ft 10 in (178 cm)
- Weight: 179 lb (81 kg; 12 st 11 lb)
- Position: Left wing
- Shot: Left
- Played for: Lake Erie Monsters; Norfolk Admirals; Fife Flyers
- NHL draft: Undrafted
- Playing career: 2010–2013

Casey Haines (born August 23, 1986) is an American former professional ice hockey player who last played for the Fife Flyers of the Elite Ice Hockey League (EIHL).

== Playing career ==
Haines attended Ferris State University where he played NCAA Division I college hockey with the Ferris State Bulldogs men's ice hockey team scoring 25 goals and 35 assists for 60 points in 142 games.

On July 13, 2010, the Reading Royals signed Haines to his first professional contract.

After two seasons with the Royals, Haines signed abroad in the United Kingdom signing a one-year contract with Fife Flyers of the EIHL on August 8, 2012.

== Career statistics ==
			Regular season					Playoffs
Season	Team	League	GP	G	A	Pts	PIM	GP	G	A	Pts	PIM
2003–04	Texarkana Bandits	NAHL	49	2	9	11	40	—	—	—	—	—
2004–05	Texarkana Bandits	NAHL	53	20	27	47	57	9	4	2	6	17
2005–06	Texarkana Bandits	NAHL	58	29	44	73	75	8	5	3	8	12
2006–07	Ferris State	CCHA	31	3	2	5	22	—	—	—	—	—
2007–08	Ferris State	CCHA	33	4	4	8	20	—	—	—	—	—
2008–09	Ferris State	CCHA	38	6	10	16	10	—	—	—	—	—
2009–10	Ferris State	CCHA	40	12	19	31	49	—	—	—	—	—
2010–11	Reading Royals	ECHL	64	18	16	34	30	8	1	3	4	0
2010–11	Lake Erie Monsters	AHL	1	0	0	0	2	—	—	—	—	—
2011–12	Reading Royals	ECHL	54	11	23	34	32	5	0	1	1	2
2011–12	Norfolk Admirals	AHL	2	0	0	0	0	—	—	—	—	—
2012–13	Fife Flyers	EIHL	45	24	40	64	38	2	1	0	1	0
ECHL totals			118	29	39	68	62	13	1	4	5	2
