= Jason Beckett =

Canadian ice hockey player (born 1980)

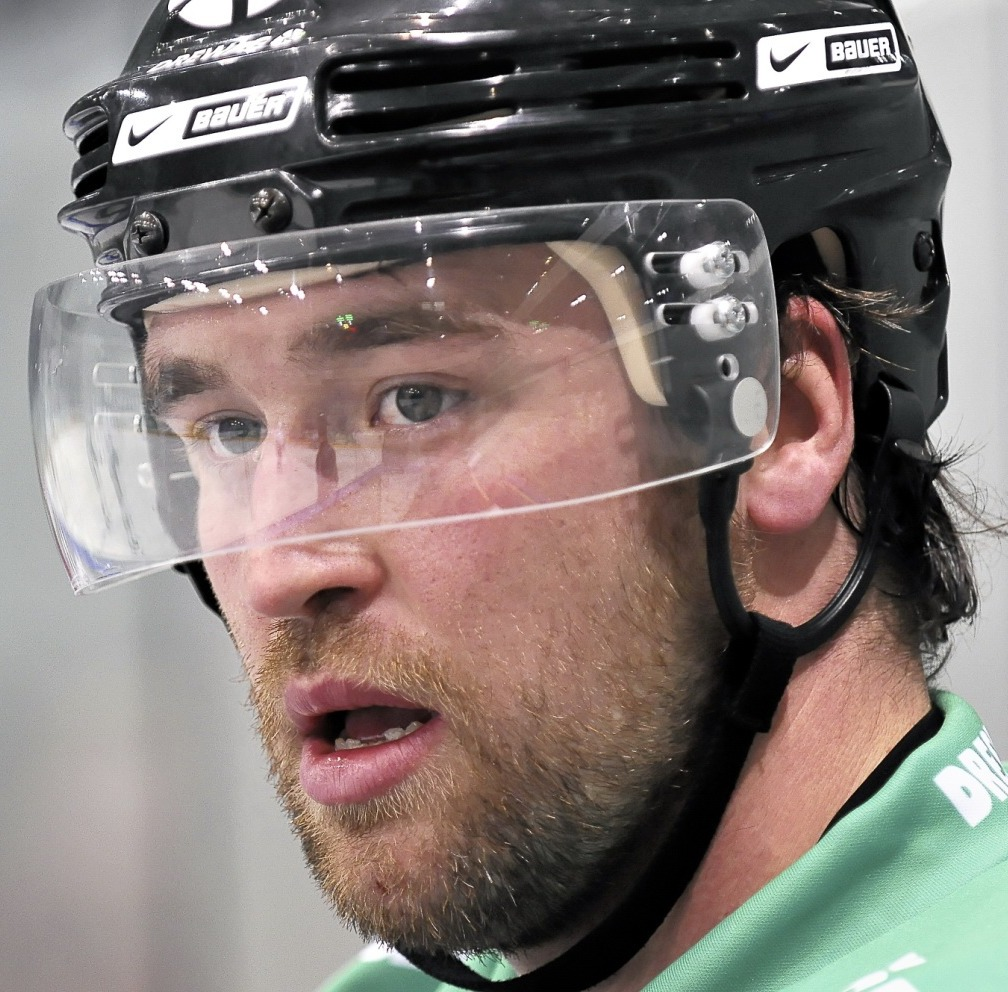
- Beckett in 2009
- Born: July 23, 1980 (age 45) Lethbridge, Alberta, Canada
- Height: 6 ft 3 in (191 cm)
- Weight: 216 lb (98 kg; 15 st 6 lb)
- Position: Defence
- Shot: Right
- Played for: Philadelphia Phantoms; Milwaukee Admirals; Houston Aeros; Syracuse Crunch; Grand Rapids Griffins; HK Acroni Jesenice; Nottingham Panthers
- NHL draft: 42nd overall, 1998; Philadelphia Flyers
- Playing career: 2000–2013

Jason Beckett (born July 23, 1980) is a Canadian former professional ice hockey defenceman who last played for the Nottingham Panthers of the British Elite Ice Hockey League (EIHL). He was drafted by the Philadelphia Flyers in the second round (42nd overall) of the 1998 NHL entry draft.

== Career statistics ==
			Regular season					Playoffs
Season	Team	League	GP	G	A	Pts	PIM	GP	G	A	Pts	PIM
1997–98	Seattle Thunderbirds	WHL	71	1	11	12	241	5	0	0	0	16
1998–99	Seattle Thunderbirds	WHL	70	4	26	30	195	11	0	1	1	40
1999–00	Seattle Thunderbirds	WHL	70	3	15	18	183	7	1	1	2	12
2000–01	Philadelphia Phantoms	AHL	56	2	10	12	107	—	—	—	—	—
2000–01	Trenton Titans	ECHL	17	2	2	4	24	15	0	1	1	26
2001–02	Philadelphia Phantoms	AHL	9	0	0	0	11	—	—	—	—	—
2001–02	Trenton Titans	ECHL	14	1	1	2	49	3	0	0	0	4
2001–02	Milwaukee Admirals	AHL	28	2	4	6	56	—	—	—	—	—
2002–03	Milwaukee Admirals	AHL	64	2	10	12	130	6	0	1	1	12
2003–04	Houston Aeros	AHL	72	4	7	11	168	2	0	0	0	7
2004–05	Pensacola Ice Pilots	ECHL	64	10	17	27	140	4	0	0	0	10
2004–05	Syracuse Crunch	AHL	5	0	0	0	6	—	—	—	—	—
2006–07	Stockton Thunder	ECHL	63	5	16	21	111	6	1	0	1	6
2006–07	Grand Rapids Griffins	AHL	4	1	0	1	2	—	—	—	—	—
2007–08	EC Salzburg II	ANL	29	10	15	25	118	11	6	8	14	12
2008–09	Fort Wayne Komets	IHL	8	0	2	2	15	—	—	—	—	—
2008–09	Dresdner Eislöwen	2.GBun	31	2	12	14	54	—	—	—	—	—
2009–10	EC Salzburg II	ANL	32	6	33	39	109	5	1	3	4	16
2010–11	HK Acroni Jesenice	EBEL	39	1	5	6	91	—	—	—	—	—
2011–12	Kallinge/Ronneby IF	Div.1	32	2	3	5	96	—	—	—	—	—
2012–13	Nottingham Panthers	EIHL	51	5	11	16	155	4	0	0	0	10
AHL totals			238	11	31	42	480	8	0	1	1	19
