= Daren Machesney =

Canadian ice hockey player

- Born: December 13, 1986 (age 39) Hamilton, Ontario, Canada
- Height: 6 ft 0 in (183 cm)
- Weight: 185 lb (84 kg; 13 st 3 lb)
- Position: Goaltender
- Caught: Left
- Played for: Hershey Bears; Springfield Falcons; Worcester Sharks; Manitoba Moose
- NHL draft: 143rd overall, 2005; Washington Capitals
- Playing career: 2006–2013

Daren Machesney (born December 13, 1986) is a Canadian former professional ice hockey goaltender who last played for the Dundas Real McCoys in the Allan Cup Hockey (ACH) during the 2013–2014 season.

== Playing career ==
Machesney was selected by the Washington Capitals in the fifth round (143rd overall) of the 2005 NHL entry draft. In August 2018, he was hired as the goaltending coach for the London Knights of the Ontario Hockey League.
