= Brock McPherson =

Canadian ice hockey player

- Born: July 24, 1985 (age 40) Toronto, Ontario, Canada
- Height: 6 ft 1 in (185 cm)
- Weight: 223 lb (101 kg; 15 st 13 lb)
- Position: Right wing
- Shot: Left
- Played for: Braehead Clan; Dundee Stars
- Playing career: 2011–2014

Brock McPherson (born July 24, 1985) is a Canadian former professional ice hockey right winger. He played for the Braehead Clan and the Dundee Stars in the Elite Ice Hockey League in the United Kingdom between 2011 and 2014. McPherson had previously played junior hockey in the Ontario Hockey League for the Brampton Battalion and the Belleville Bulls and then spent six years at Lakehead University before signing his first professional contract with Braehead in 2011.
