= Peter Hirsch (ice hockey) =

Danish ice hockey player

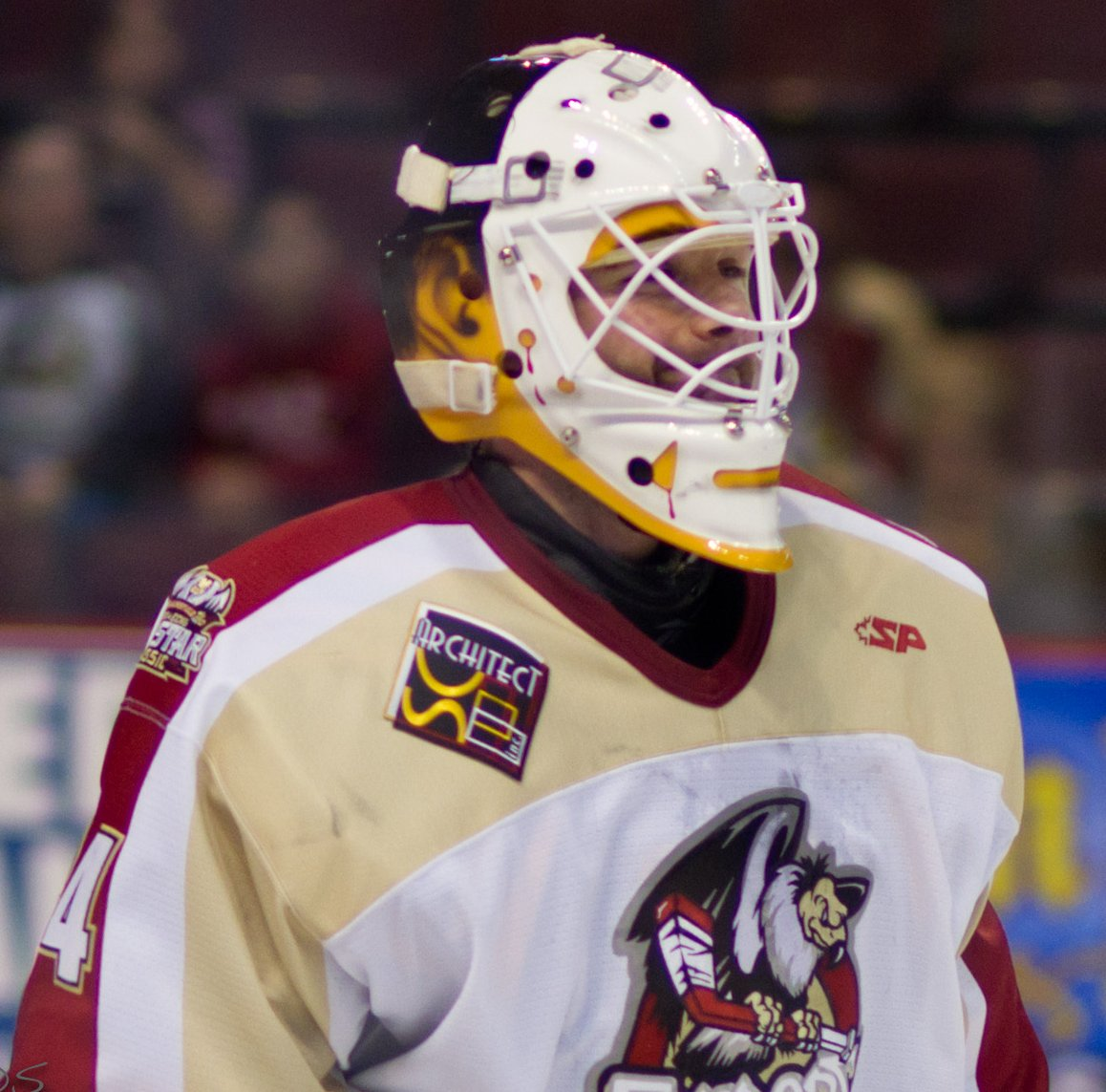
- Born: March 6, 1979 (age 46) Copenhagen, Denmark
- Height: 5 ft 11 in (180 cm)
- Weight: 171 lb (78 kg; 12 st 3 lb)
- Position: Goaltender
- Caught: Right
- Played for: MODO Hockey; Bakersfield Condors; Malmo IF; Aalborg AaB; Timra IK; Coventry Blaze
- National team: Denmark
- NHL draft: Undrafted
- Playing career: 1995–2014

Peter Hirsch (born March 6, 1979) is a Danish former professional ice hockey goaltender.

== Playing career ==
After playing three seasons for Modo Hockey in the Swedish Hockey League, Hirsch spent a season with the Bakersfield Condors in the ECHL. During the 2007–08 season he represented AaB Ishockey in the Danish Elite League, where he on previous occasions had played for Rungsted IK and Nordsjælland Cobras.

In 2009 Hirsch joined the British club Coventry Blaze, where he helped the team win the Elite Ice Hockey League title before returning to North America and the Bakersfield Condors the following season. He also played for Pensacola Ice Flyers of the Southern Professional Hockey League during the 2010–11 season.

On April 12, 2011, it was confirmed that Hirsch would return to Coventry Blaze, in the hope that he could help the team claim back the EIHL title.

Hirsch has served as Team Denmark's number-one goaltender in the International Ice Hockey Federation Ice Hockey World Championships.

== Career statistics ==
=== Regular season & playoffs ===
			Regular season			Playoffs
Season	Team	League	GP	GAA	SV%	GP	GAA	SV%
1995–96	Rungsted/Nordsjælland	Denmark	–	–	–	–	–	–
1996–97	Rungsted/Nordsjælland	Denmark	19	3.05	–	–	–	–
1997–98	IF Troja/Ljungby	Allsvenskan	0	0	0	–	–	–
1998–99	IF Troja/Ljungby	Allsvenskan	26	2.82	–	–	–	–
1999-00	IF Troja/Ljungby	Allsvenskan	29	2.91	.897	–	–	–
2000–01	MODO	Elitserien	11	2.96	.889	0	0	0
2001–02	MODO	Elitserien	29	2.76	.901	10	3.09	.899
2002–03	MODO	Elitserien	21	2.55	.911	4	2.57	.930
2003–04	Bakersfield Condors	ECHL	14	2.70	.904	–	–	–
2004–05	Malmö Redhawks	Elitserien	5	4.67	.829	–	–	–
2004–05	Rungsted/Nordsjælland	Denmark	–	–	–	7	1.38	.950
2005–06	Rungsted/Nordsjælland	Denmark	35	2.31	.930	14	3.10	.906
2006–07	Rungsted/Nordsjælland	Denmark	2	2.56	.875	–	–	–
2006–07	Leksands IF	Allsvenskan	30	2.09	.916	2	4.20	.821
2007–08	AaB Ishockey	Denmark	45	–	–	5	3.80	.865
2008–09	AaB Ishockey	Denmark	5	3.49	.880	–	–	–
2008–09	Timrå IK	Elitserien	2	3.04	.882	–	–	–
2008–09	Oskarshamn	Allsvenskan	7	3.37	.890	–	–	–
2009–10	Coventry Blaze	EIHL	56	2.86	.917	3	2.33	.940
2010–11	Bakersfield Condors	ECHL	12	3.40	.874	–	–	–
2010–11	Pensacola Ice Flyers	SPHL	7	3.74	.864	–	–	–

=== International ===
			International
Season	Team	Division	GP	GAA	SV%
1996–97	Denmark U18	EJC-18 B	6	3.50	.877
1998–99	Denmark U20	WJC-20 B	6	–	.875
1999-00	Denmark	WC B	5	2.62	.912
2000–01	Denmark	WC D1	5	2.80	.895
2001–02	Denmark	WC D1	5	1.93	.917
2002–03	Denmark	WC	6	4.89	.884
2003–04	Denmark	WC	5	5.51	.843
2004–05	Denmark	WC	6	3.79	.892
2005–06	Denmark	WC	6	3.01	.904
2006–07	Denmark	WC	3	5.12	.824
2007–08	Denmark	WC	3	5.12	.870
