= Benn Olson =

Canadian ice hockey player

- Born: April 29, 1987 (age 38) Port McNeill, British Columbia, Canada
- Height: 6 ft 4 in (193 cm)
- Weight: 215 lb (98 kg; 15 st 5 lb)
- Position: Defence
- Shoots: Left
- EIHL team Former teams: Coventry Blaze; AHL; Houston Aeros; Bridgeport Sound Tigers; Milwaukee Admirals; Albany River Rats; ECHL; Florida Everblades; Cincinnati Cyclones; Alaska Aces; Ontario Reign
- NHL draft: Undrafted
- Playing career: 2008–present

Benn Olson (born April 29, 1987) is a Canadian professional ice hockey defenceman who last played for the Coventry Blaze in the Elite Ice Hockey League.

== Career ==
Olson has played extensively in the minor leagues between the ECHL and AHL in each of his four seasons as a professional. His post-season experience has been entirely in the ECHL, once with the Florida Everblades in 2010 and once with the Ontario Reign in 2012. Other teams Olson has played for include the Houston Aeros, Bridgeport Sound Tigers, Milwaukee Admirals, and Albany River Rats of the AHL, and the Cincinnati Cyclones and Alaska Aces of the ECHL. Olson played juniors in the WHL, for the Kamloops Blazers and the Seattle Thunderbirds.

Olson's role as a defenceman has led him into the position of an enforcer; he has amassed 723 penalty minutes in 203 professional games, and 835 in his days in the WHL over 275 games.
