= Stephen Murphy (ice hockey) =

British ice hockey player (born 1981)

- Born: 11 December 1981 (age 44) Dundee, Scotland
- Height: 5 ft 10 in (178 cm)
- Weight: 158 lb (72 kg; 11 st 4 lb)
- Position: Goaltender
- Caught: Left
- Played for: Paisley Pirates; Fife Flyers; Dundee Stars; Bracknell Bees; IF Björklöven; Bräcke IK; IFK Arboga; Edinburgh Capitals; Stjernen Hockey; Manchester Phoenix; Belfast Giants; Manchester Storm
- National team: Great Britain
- Playing career: 1997–2021

Stephen James Murphy (born 11 December 1981) is a British former professional ice hockey goaltender.

== Early life ==
Murphy was born in Dundee, Scotland, United Kingdom. He began playing ice hockey at the age of five. He made his first professional appearances at the age of 16 with the Paisley Pirates of the BNL. Murphy made two appearances for the Pirates during the 1997/98 season before moving on to the Fife Flyers. Whilst in Fife, Murphy helped the Flyers win the Scottish Cup. He established himself as the Flyers' first-choice goaltender despite his young age and in the 1998–1999 season recorded a GAA of 3.61 and a save percentage of .918.

== Career ==
In 1999, at the age of 17, Murphy became the goaltender for the Great Britain National Team and played on five occasions for them in the World Junior Championships, proving himself to be a reliable last line of defence. This solidified his position as the Flyers' first choice goaltender and he continued to play for them during the 1999–2000 season, featuring in the BNL as well as the B&H Cup and the Christmas Cup. Once again the Flyers made the post-season, with Murphy playing every game in the playoffs.

In 2000, Murphy moved to the United States to sign for the Omaha Lancers of the USHL. He failed to make an appearance and moved mid-season to the Cleveland Barons. He finished the 2000–2001 season in Scotland, once again playing for the Flyers. In the summer of 2001, Murphy played again for the Team GB junior squad but also featured for the senior team where he recorded 1.97 goals against average and a .917 save percentage.

Murphy remained in Scotland for the 2001–2002 term, although he signed for the Dundee Stars and played alongside British hockey great Tony Hand for the first time at club level. Murphy played 43 games for the Stars in the regular season and made 10 post-season appearances. He again appeared for Team GB in 2002, in the World Cup. Murphy remained in his hometown of Dundee for the 2002–2003 season, whilst the British ice hockey organisation was undergoing considerable restructuring.

A move followed for the 2003–2004 term, this time to the Bracknell Bees, a team now playing in the transitional BNL following the collapse of the ISL. Murphy played eight regular season games for the Bees due to a shoulder injury which kept him off the ice for the remainder of the season. He moved into European hockey for the 2004–2005 season. He found regular games with Swedish Division I team Bräcke IK. After three months, Murphy was poached by the higher level HockeyAllsvenskan team IF Björklöven to play out the remainder of the season for them. Murphy adapted to the change in standard well, and completed the season as a Björklöven player. They failed to make the post-season however and so Murphy returned to Scotland to play in three post-season games for the Stars.

The following season, after again playing for Team GB, Murphy returned to IFK Arboga IK. Arboga struggled in the league but managed to retain their membership in HockeyAllsvenskan through playing in the end of season relegation playoffs. Arboga struggled financially however, prompting Murphy to return to the United Kingdom and play for the Edinburgh Capitals in the recently established EIHL, now the top level of ice hockey in the UK following the lengthy restructuring process.

Murphy played every regular season game for the Capitals, and won the EIHL 'Best British Goaltender' award for his play. Despite this, the Capitals failed to make the EIHL post-season as they struggled for regular goalscorers. Murphy returned to Scandinavia and Norway to ice for Stjernen Hockey, a team playing in the GET-ligaen, the top club league in Norway. In 36 regular season games, Murphy recorded a 3.18 GAA and a .901 PCT.

In the summer of 2008, Murphy was persuaded to once again play alongside Tony Hand, with Hand now acting as player/coach of the EIHL Manchester Phoenix. Murphy had proved an excellent signing for the Phoenix and has once again established himself as the organisation's first choice goaltender. A solid season followed for Murphy, who helped the Phoenix to both the Knockout and Challenge Cup finals and once again was awarded Best British Goaltender. Despite the on-ice success, the Phoenix withdrew from the EIHL at the end of the season in favour of playing in the EPL, going on to sign Steve Fone as first choice goaltender. Murphy chose to remain in the EIHL however, and move on to the Belfast Giants.

After over a decade in Belfast, in March 2021, Murphy was signed by fellow EIHL side Manchester Storm as one of their back-up netminders for the 2021 Elite Series.

Murphy announced his retirement from the sport in July 2021.

== Awards and honours ==
Award	Year
EIHL First All-Star team	2011–12
