= John DeCaro =

American ice hockey player (born 1982)

- Born: November 9, 1982 (age 42) Marysville, Washington, USA
- Height: 6 ft 3 in (191 cm)
- Weight: 216 lb (98 kg; 15 st 6 lb)
- Position: Goaltender
- Caught: Left
- EIHL team Former teams: Sheffield Steelers; Alaska Aces; Bossier-Shreveport Mudbugs; Philadelphia Phantoms; Las Vegas Wranglers; Portland Pirates
- Playing career: 2006–2014

John DeCaro (born November 9, 1982) is an American retired professional ice hockey goaltender who played for the Sheffield Steelers of the Elite Ice Hockey League. In the 2013–2014 season, DeCaro retired from professional ice hockey.
