= Kevin Saurette =

Canadian ice hockey player

- Born: June 27, 1980 (age 46) Winnipeg, Manitoba, Canada
- Height: 6 ft 0 in (183 cm)
- Weight: 190 lb (86 kg; 13 st 8 lb)
- Position: Forward
- Shot: Right
- Played for: Binghamton Senators; Reading Royals; ESV Kaufbeuren; ETC Crimmitschau; Fischtown Pinguins; Belfast Giants
- NHL draft: Undrafted
- Playing career: 2006–2015

Kevin Saurette (born June 27, 1980) is a Canadian former professional ice hockey forward.

Saurette began his professional career in 2006 in the ECHL for the Reading Royals where his spell also included two loan spells with the Binghamton Senators of the American Hockey League. In 2008, Saurette moved to Germany and played for ESV Kaufbeuren of the third-tier Oberliga where he scored 98 points in 59 games. In 2009 he moved to ETC Crimmitschau in the 2nd Bundesliga and stayed for two seasons before moving to the Fischtown Pinguins in 2011.

He then returned to Kaufbeuren in 2012, who were now played in the 2nd Bundesliga, but left after 25 games and signed for the Belfast Giants in the Elite Ice Hockey League.

Saurette has worked as executive for the Manitoba Junior Hockey League since 2016 and been the league's commissioner since June 2020.
