= 2022–23 EIHL season =

- League: Elite Ice Hockey League
- Sport: Ice hockey
- Duration: 10 September 2022 – 16 April 2023
- Matches: 330
- Teams: 10
- Total attendance: 1,004,000
- Average attendance: 3,148

Regular season
- League champions: Belfast Giants
- Season MVP: Scott Conway (Belfast Giants)
- Top scorer: Scott Conway (Belfast Giants)

Challenge Cup
- Winners: Belfast Giants
- Runners-up: Fife Flyers

British Championship
- Champions: Belfast Giants
- Runners-up: Cardiff Devils

EIHL seasons
- ← 2021–22 2023–24 →

The 2022–23 EIHL season was the 19th season of the Elite Ice Hockey League. The regular season commenced on 10 September 2022, and finished on 2 April 2023; the playoffs were then contested over 7 to 16 April 2023.

The Belfast Giants became the first team since the Nottingham Panthers in 2012–13, and third overall, to win a Grand Slam of titles – winning the league, playoff and Challenge Cup titles. Either side of their 9–3 Challenge Cup final victory over the Fife Flyers, the Giants won 25 of their last 30 league games to overhaul long-time league leaders, the Guildford Flames, to win the regular season title for a record sixth time – taking the title with a 6–1 home victory over the Flames. After seeing off the Glasgow Clan and the Panthers in the first two playoff rounds, the Giants met the Cardiff Devils for the third consecutive final, with the Devils having won the previous two meetings. Having fallen behind to Mark Richardson's first-period goal, the Giants then scored four goals without reply to take their first playoff title since 2009–10 to complete the Grand Slam.

== Teams ==
The same ten teams that competed in 2021–22 competed in the 2022–23 season.

Locations of the EIHL 2022–23 teams

Team	City/Town	Arena	Capacity
Belfast Giants	Belfast	SSE Arena Belfast	8,700
Cardiff Devils	(Wales) Cardiff	Ice Arena Wales	3,100
Coventry Blaze	(England) Coventry	Coventry Skydome	3,000
Dundee Stars	(Scotland) Dundee	Dundee Ice Arena	2,400
Fife Flyers	(Scotland) Kirkcaldy	Fife Ice Arena	3,525
Glasgow Clan	(Scotland) Glasgow	Braehead Arena	4,000
Guildford Flames	(England) Guildford	Guildford Spectrum	2,001
Manchester Storm	(England) Altrincham	Altrincham Ice Dome	2,351
Nottingham Panthers	(England) Nottingham	Motorpoint Arena Nottingham	7,500
Sheffield Steelers	(England) Sheffield	Utilita Arena Sheffield	9,300

== Regular season ==
=== League standings ===
Each team played 54 games, playing each of the other nine teams six times: three times on home ice, and three times away from home. Points were awarded for each game, where two points were awarded for all victories, regardless of whether it was in regulation time or after overtime or game-winning shots. One point was awarded for losing in overtime or game-winning shots, and zero points for losing in regulation time. At the end of the regular season, the team that finished with the most points was crowned the league champion, and qualified for the 2023–24 Champions Hockey League. The top eight teams qualified for the playoffs.

The Belfast Giants won a record third consecutive Elite Ice Hockey League regular season title (and sixth overall), with a 6–1 home victory over their closest rivals, the Guildford Flames on 1 April 2023.

Pos	Team	Pld	W	OTW	OTL	L	GF	GA	GD	Pts	Qualification
1	Belfast Giants (C)	54	37	4	2	11	231	120	+111	84	Regular season champions Qualification to playoffs
2	Guildford Flames	54	31	9	2	12	209	159	+50	82	Qualification to playoffs
3	Sheffield Steelers	54	32	4	5	13	190	129	+61	77	Qualification to playoffs
4	Cardiff Devils	54	29	6	5	14	192	142	+50	75	Qualification to playoffs
5	Coventry Blaze	54	25	8	6	15	200	161	+39	72	Qualification to playoffs
6	Manchester Storm	54	20	2	4	28	163	203	−40	48	Qualification to playoffs
7	Nottingham Panthers	54	15	6	5	28	149	191	−42	47	Qualification to playoffs
8	Glasgow Clan	54	13	2	5	34	134	203	−69	35	Qualification to playoffs
9	Fife Flyers	54	12	2	6	34	118	193	−75	34	
10	Dundee Stars	54	11	2	5	36	142	227	−85	31	

Source: Elite League
Rules for classification:
- In-season: 1) Points; 2) Fewest games played; end of season criteria as below.
- End of season: 1) Points; 2) Games won in regulation time; 3) Number of games won; 4) Head-to-head results, ranked by criteria 1 to 3; 5) Fewest regulation losses; 6) Away game results, ranked by criteria 1 to 3; 7) Goals scored; 8) Goal difference; 9) Fewest penalty minutes; 10) Drawing of lots.
(C) Champion

=== Results ===
Home \ Away	BEL	CAR	COV	DUN	FIF	GLA	GUI	MAN	NOT	SHE	BEL	CAR	COV	DUN	FIF	GLA	GUI	MAN	NOT	SHE	BEL	CAR	COV	DUN	FIF	GLA	GUI	MAN	NOT	SHE
Belfast	—	9–3	7–0	3–2 (SO)	8–0	1–0	2–4	2–5	5–2	5–3	—	3–1	6–1	4–3	3–1	6–3	2–1	4–5	3–4 (SO)	1–0 (SO)	—	4–5 (OT)	1–3	5–2	9–4	8–0	6–1	9–1	6–1	8–2
Cardiff	2–4	—	1–2 (OT)	6–4	7–4	6–3	4–2	8–1	5–1	2–5	4–2	—	4–1	5–3	7–1	5–1	2–5	4–1	6–2	3–1	4–1	—	3–4 (OT)	5–4 (SO)	4–0	5–1	3–1	1–2	4–5 (OT)	4–0
Coventry	4–5	2–3 (OT)	—	7–2	3–2	4–3 (OT)	4–5	5–4	2–1	2–3	3–5	6–0	—	4–0	1–0 (SO)	3–0	3–4 (OT)	9–0	6–3	5–4 (SO)	2–4	4–2	—	3–5	5–0	4–1	2–4	4–3	7–4	4–3 (SO)
Dundee	1–7	5–3	1–5	—	4–2	6–3	0–5	4–5 (OT)	4–2	1–7	2–3 (OT)	4–5	4–3 (SO)	—	3–2	1–4	2–5	3–1	4–5 (OT)	0–5	9–2	1–4	3–6	—	1–4	1–3	4–6	3–5	1–2	2–5
Fife	2–3	3–4 (OT)	5–3	2–4	—	2–3	3–5	1–5	6–1	1–5	2–7	0–3	2–3	4–1	—	4–5 (SO)	1–2 (OT)	5–4 (SO)	1–4	2–3	2–5	3–4 (OT)	3–2 (OT)	4–0	—	1–5	2–6	2–0	3–2	0–1 (SO)
Glasgow	1–4	0–5	4–5 (SO)	6–1	1–2	—	2–4	3–0	2–3 (SO)	0–3	3–4 (OT)	3–2 (OT)	4–1	2–3 (OT)	3–1	—	2–3	2–3	1–3	1–7	0–4	3–4	3–5	5–2	4–2	—	1–5	2–6	5–8	3–6
Guildford	4–3	5–4 (OT)	4–3	6–3	5–3	2–1	—	4–3 (OT)	4–3 (OT)	1–4	2–1	3–0	5–4 (SO)	4–2	4–2	5–3	—	5–6	5–4	3–4	1–6	2–4	2–3	7–3	5–0	5–4	—	6–4	3–4 (SO)	1–4
Manchester	2–5	0–3	4–5 (OT)	5–2	5–6	6–3	3–6	—	7–1	4–5	0–3	1–2 (SO)	1–5	5–4	1–5	2–4	8–1	—	2–0	3–6	1–4	1–4	3–4	3–2	4–2	6–2	2–9	—	1–4	3–1
Nottingham	5–4	5–2	1–6	6–2	1–3	6–2	4–3 (OT)	1–3	—	1–5	3–5	5–2	6–4	4–2	1–6	4–2	2–4	1–5	—	3–4 (OT)	0–2	3–1	2–4	1–5	4–0	1–2	1–2 (SO)	3–4 (OT)	—	1–4
Sheffield	2–1	1–3	5–4 (SO)	1–2	6–0	6–2	3–4 (OT)	7–1	3–2 (SO)	—	2–3	2–3	4–1	9–4	3–0	2–4	2–4	4–2	3–2	—	0–4	3–2	3–5	2–1	1–0	5–4	4–5 (OT)	3–1	4–1	—

Source: Elite League
Legend: Blue = home team win; Yellow = draw; Red = away team win.

=== Statistics ===
==== Scoring leaders ====
The following players led the league in points, at the conclusion of the regular season. If two or more skaters are tied (i.e. same number of points, goals and played games), all of the tied skaters are shown.

Player	Team	GP	G	A	Pts	+/–	PIM
Scott Conway	Belfast Giants	51	40	50	90	+53	56
Daniel Tedesco	Guildford Flames	53	31	49	80	+25	16
David Goodwin	Belfast Giants	53	15	55	70	+53	8
Brett Ferguson	Guildford Flames	53	22	45	67	+32	90
Trevor Cox	Cardiff Devils	53	16	50	66	+33	14
Cole Sanford	Cardiff Devils	52	38	27	65	+34	38
Ryan Tait	Guildford Flames	54	28	34	62	+19	6
Philippe Sanche	Dundee Stars	49	24	36	60	−10	39
Marcus Crawford	Cardiff Devils	54	9	48	57	+47	87
Joey Martin	Cardiff Devils	53	22	34	56	+23	27

==== Leading goaltenders ====
The following goaltenders led the league in goals against average, provided that they have played at least 40% of their team's minutes, at the conclusion of the regular season.

Player	Team(s)	GP	TOI	W	L	GA	SO	SV%	GAA
Taran Kozun	Cardiff Devils	25	1368:01	16	6	50	3	92.80%	2.19
Matt Greenfield	Sheffield Steelers	53	3176:49	36	17	117	7	92.01%	2.21
Jackson Whistle	Belfast Giants	26	1424:07	17	7	53	3	91.76%	2.23
Taz Burman	Guildford Flames	22	1322:52	19	3	59	3	90.48%	2.68
Paavo Hölsä	Coventry Blaze	47	2824:15	28	18	128	6	90.72%	2.72

== Playoffs ==
=== Bracket ===
In the two-legged quarter-finals, the highest-ranked team met the lowest-ranked team, the second-highest-ranked team met the second-lowest-ranked team and so forth. The winners of each tie was determined by aggregate scoring over the two games. In the semi-finals, the highest remaining seed was matched against the lowest remaining seed, with the other two teams facing off. The winners of the semi-finals progressed to the Final, with the losers playing in the third-place match.

Quarter-finals (7–9 April)
1	Belfast Giants	4	3	7
8	Glasgow Clan	2	4	6
2	Guildford Flames	1	5	6
7	Nottingham Panthers	4	3	7
(Pairings are reseeded after the first round)
3	Sheffield Steelers	2	5	7
6	Manchester Storm	2	2	4
4	Cardiff Devils	5	1	6
5	Coventry Blaze	1	2	3

Semi-finals (15 April)
1	Belfast Giants	6
7	Nottingham Panthers	3
3	Sheffield Steelers	2
4	Cardiff Devils	3

Final (16 April)
1	Belfast Giants	4
4	Cardiff Devils	1
Third place
3	Sheffield Steelers	7
7	Nottingham Panthers	4

=== Quarter-finals ===
The quarter-final schedule was announced after the conclusion of the final-day regular season matches.

==== (1) Belfast Giants vs. (8) Glasgow Clan ====
8 April 2023	Belfast Giants	4–2	Glasgow Clan	SSE Arena Belfast; Attendance:7,257	Recap
Mark Cooper (1) – 5:35		First period	No scoring
Steven Owre (1) – 0:16		Second period	12:40 – Steven McParland (1; PPG); 14:01 – Gabriel Chabot (1; PPG)
Gabe Bast (1; PPG) – 10:43; Steven Owre (2; PPG) – 13:31		Third period	No scoring
Tyler Beskorowany (16 shots / 14 saves)		Goalie stats	Ty Taylor (42 shots / 38 saves)

9 April 2023	Glasgow Clan	4–3	Belfast Giants	Braehead Arena; Attendance:2,512	Recap
Steven McParland (2) – 9:22; Dyson Stevenson (1; PPG) – 14:53		First period	3:12 – Scott Conway (1); 5:29 – Scott Conway (2)
Kevin Massy (1; PPG) – 5:52		Second period	4:54 – Will Cullen (1)
Jeff Solow (1) – 8:00		Third period	No scoring
Ty Taylor (35 shots / 32 saves)		Goalie stats	Tyler Beskorowany (24 shots / 20 saves)

Belfast Giants win 7–6 on aggregate.

==== (2) Guildford Flames vs. (7) Nottingham Panthers ====
8 April 2023	Nottingham Panthers	4–1	Guildford Flames	Motorpoint Arena Nottingham; Attendance:3,810	Recap
Stephen Anderson (1) – 6:43		First period	No scoring
Adam Brady (1) – 9:06; Tanner Sorenson (1) – 15:34		Second period	No scoring
David Levin (1) – 6:36		Third period	11:24 – Daniel Tedesco (1)
Peyton Jones (33 shots / 32 saves)		Goalie stats	Eamon McAdam (30 shots / 26 saves)

9 April 2023	Guildford Flames	5–3	Nottingham Panthers	Guildford Spectrum; Attendance:1,943	Recap
Ryan Tait (1) – 4:53; Ryan Tait (2) – 7:35; Peter Crinella (1; PPG) – 9:41		First period	12:30 – Tanner Sorenson (2); 17:09 – Mike Hammond (1)
No scoring		Second period	No scoring
Brett Ferguson (1) – 2:54; Ryan Tait (3; PPG) – 9:42		Third period	2:31 – Albin Lindgren (1)
Taz Burman (23 shots / 20 saves)		Goalie stats	Peyton Jones (40 shots / 35 saves)

Nottingham Panthers win 7–6 on aggregate.

==== (3) Sheffield Steelers vs. (6) Manchester Storm ====
7 April 2023	Manchester Storm	2–2	Sheffield Steelers	Altrincham Ice Dome; Attendance:2,154	Recap
No scoring		First period	No scoring
No scoring		Second period	0:22 – Brett Neumann (1); 16:19 – Brendan Connolly (1; PPG)
Cameron Critchlow (1) – 12:30; Scott Simmonds (1) – 13:53		Third period	No scoring
Jeremy Brodeur (42 shots / 40 saves)		Goalie stats	Matt Greenfield (26 shots / 24 saves)

8 April 2023	Sheffield Steelers	5–2	Manchester Storm	Sheffield Arena; Attendance:7,651	Recap
Scott Allen (1) – 7:10; Brett Neumann (2; PPG) – 12:33		First period	3:09 – Anthony DeLuca (1; PPG)
Martin Látal (1; PPG) – 8:24; Danny Kristo (1) – 16:01		Second period	No scoring
Danny Kristo (2) – 8:16		Third period	5:39 – Cole Carter (1)
Matt Greenfield (23 shots / 21 saves)		Goalie stats	Jeremy Brodeur (39 shots / 34 saves)

Sheffield Steelers win 7–4 on aggregate.

==== (4) Cardiff Devils vs. (5) Coventry Blaze ====
8 April 2023	Coventry Blaze	1–5	Cardiff Devils	Coventry Skydome; Attendance:2,347	Recap
John Curran (1) – 13:12		First period	17:42 – Brodie Reid (1)
No scoring		Second period	2:26 – Joey Martin (1); 4:50 – Josh Brittain (1); 9:41 – Josh Waller (1)
No scoring		Third period	16:34 – Trevor Cox (1)
Paavo Hölsä (34 shots / 29 saves)		Goalie stats	Ben Bowns (32 shots / 31 saves)

9 April 2023	Cardiff Devils	1–2	Coventry Blaze	Ice Arena Wales; Attendance:3,100	Recap
No scoring		First period	6:19 – Kim Tallberg (1; PPG)
No scoring		Second period	3:05 – Tyler Kirkup (1)
Jake Coughler (1; ENG) – 18:00		Third period	No scoring
Ben Bowns (40 shots / 38 saves)		Goalie stats	Miklós Rajna (25 shots / 25 saves)

Cardiff Devils win 6–3 on aggregate.

=== Semi-finals ===
The schedule for the Playoff Finals weekend was announced after the conclusion of the quarter-final matches.

15 April 2023; 15:00	Belfast Giants	6–3 (3–1, 1–1, 2–1)	Nottingham Panthers	Motorpoint Arena Nottingham

Game reference

Tyler Beskorowany
Goalies
Peyton Jones
Referees:
Matt Rose
Andy Dalton
Linesmen:
Scott Rodger
Ilia Kisil

Steven Owre (3) – 2:07	1–0
Sean Norris (1) – 5:12	2–0
Ben Lake (1) – 9:58	3–0
	3–1	12:11 – Jack Hopkins (1; PPG)
David Goodwin (1) – 24:49	4–1
	4–2	33:00 – Stephen Anderson (2)
Ben Lake (2) – 47:31	5–2
	5–3	51:41 – Jakub Ižacký (1)
Sean Norris (2) – 52:52	6–3

6 min
Penalties
4 min
24
Shots
41

15 April 2023; 19:00	Sheffield Steelers	2–3 (OT) (2–1, 0–0, 0–1, 0–1)	Cardiff Devils	Motorpoint Arena Nottingham

Game reference

Matt Greenfield
Goalies
Ben Bowns
Referees:
Tom Pering
Liam Sewell
Linesmen:
Danny Beresford
Lee Young

Robert Dowd (1) – 8:04	1–0
Scott Allen (2; PPG) – 12:16	2–0
	2–1	12:58 – Trevor Cox (2)
	2–2	53:23 – Ben Davies (1)
	2–3	62:07 – Jake Coughler (2; PPG)

6 min
Penalties
4 min
30
Shots
36

=== Third-place match ===
16 April 2023; 13:00	Sheffield Steelers	7–4 (3–2, 1–1, 3–1)	Nottingham Panthers	Motorpoint Arena Nottingham

Game reference

- Hayden Lavigne (54:41)
- Curtis Warburton (5:19)
Goalies
- Matthew Bloor (54:22)
- Luca Sheldon (5:38)
Referees:
David Good
Daniel Ferguson
Linesmen:
Ethan Hardy
Lewis Dolan

Niklas Nevalainen (1) – 7:58	1–0
	1–1	14:56 – Matthew Myers (1)
Scott Allen (3; SHG) – 17:19	2–1
	2–2	17:34 – Matthew Myers (2; PPG)
Robert Dowd (2) – 19:12	3–2
Brett Neumann (3) – 29:42	4–2
	4–3	34:26 – Stephen Anderson (3)
	4–4	41:36 – Jack Hopkins (2)
Calle Ackered (1) – 44:13	5–4
Niklas Nevalainen (2) – 52:30	6–4
Jonathan Phillips (1) – 54:41	7–4

2 min
Penalties
0 min
36
Shots
35

=== Final ===
16 April 2023; 17:00	Belfast Giants	4–1 (0–1, 1–0, 3–0)	Cardiff Devils	Motorpoint Arena Nottingham

Game reference

Tyler Beskorowany
Goalies
Ben Bowns
Referees:
Tom Pering
Liam Sewell
Linesmen:
Lee Young
Ilia Kisil

	0–1	19:58 – Mark Richardson (1)
Jeff Baum (1) – 37:20	1–1
Steven Owre (4) – 51:42	2–1
Donovan Neuls (1) – 52:38	3–1
Mark Cooper (2; ENG) – 57:21	4–1

2 min
Penalties
8 min
42
Shots
27

=== Statistics ===
==== Scoring leaders ====
The following players led the league in points, at the conclusion of the playoffs. If two or more skaters are tied (i.e. same number of points, goals and played games), all of the tied skaters are shown.

Player	Team	GP	G	A	Pts	+/–	PIM
Steven Owre	Belfast Giants	4	4	2	6	+7	2
Scott Allen	Sheffield Steelers	4	3	2	5	0	0
Stephen Anderson	Nottingham Panthers	4	3	2	5	+3	0
Scott Conway	Belfast Giants	4	2	3	5	+7	6
Danny Kristo	Sheffield Steelers	4	2	3	5	–1	2
David Goodwin	Belfast Giants	4	1	4	5	+9	0
Mike Hammond	Nottingham Panthers	4	1	4	5	+3	0
Cole Sanford	Cardiff Devils	4	0	5	5	+2	2
Ryan Tait	Guildford Flames	2	3	1	4	+1	0
Brett Neumann	Sheffield Steelers	4	3	1	4	0	2

==== Leading goaltenders ====
The following goaltenders led the league in goals against average, provided that they have played at least 40% of their team's minutes, at the conclusion of the playoffs.

Player	Team(s)	GP	TOI	W	L	GA	SO	SV%	GAA
Miklós Rajna	Coventry Blaze	1	55:51	1	0	0	1	100.00%	0.00
Ben Bowns	Cardiff Devils	4	239:31	2	2	8	0	94.41%	2.00
Matt Greenfield	Sheffield Steelers	3	182:07	1	1	7	0	91.76%	2.31
Tyler Beskorowany	Belfast Giants	4	240:00	3	1	10	0	90.83%	2.50
Taz Burman	Guildford Flames	1	60:00	1	0	3	0	86.96%	3.00
