= Paul Thompson (ice hockey, born 1965) =

British ice hockey coach

- Born: 5 April 1965 (age 60); Singapore, Malaysia
- Occupation: Ice hockey coach
- Years active: 1994–present
- Known for: EIHL career & Team GB

Paul Thompson (born 5 April 1965) is a British ice hockey coach and general manager. He has been head coach of the Cardiff Devils in the Elite Ice Hockey League (EIHL) since 2025. He has won the most games as an EIHL coach, and received nine Coach of the Year trophies. His teams have won three Challenge Cups, two British Knockout Cups, and he is the first coach to win five Elite League titles. In the 2004–2005 season, Thompson completed the British Hockey Grand Slam; winning the Challenge Cup, the EIHL title, and the EIHL playoff championship. He served as the general manager and head coach of the Sheffield Steelers from 2015 to 2018, and previously coached 19 seasons with the Coventry Blaze organisation. He was head coach of the Great Britain men's national ice hockey team from 2006 to 2011, has coached professional teams in Denmark, Germany, Italy and Sweden; and was the head coach of the Odense Bulldogs between 2021 and 2025. He is known by the nickname "Thommo".

== Early life ==
Thompson was born on 5 April 1965, in Singapore, Malaysia. He had a brief playing career as a defenceman from 1987 to 1994, with the Solihull Barons, and the Sheffield Steelers. In 84 games, he scored 2 goals, and 17 assists.

== Professional coaching career ==
=== Beginnings in Solihull ===
Thompson began coaching a youth team in Solihull, then its reserve team, and then the Solihull Barons, which were renamed the Blaze in the following season. In his partial season coaching in Division 1, the Barons finished twelfth place. His first chance at coaching in the English Premier Ice Hockey League came in 1996–1997, with the Solihull Blaze. Thompson guided the team to a second-place finish in the season, but financial problems prevented the team from continuing into the playoffs. The team voluntarily dropped down to Division 1 in the NIHL for the 1997–1998 season, and then won the division, the league, and the playoffs, earning Thompson his first title as a coach. The Blaze returned to the EPIHL for the 1998–1999 season, and won the EPIHL championship and the playoffs. Solihull moved up to the British National League for the 1999–2000 season, placed seventh, and lost in the first round of the playoffs. Thompson won BNL Coach of the Year, his first of many awards.

=== Coventry years ===
In the 2000–2001 season, Solihull became the Coventry Blaze. Thompson improved the team to 4th in the league, but lost in the playoff round-robin. Thompson won the Coach of the Year Trophy awarded by the Ice Hockey Journalists UK. In the 2001–2002 season, Thompson again improved the team to a second-place finish, and reached the finals of the BNL playoffs. In the 2002–2003 season, Thompson coached Coventry to both the BNL season championship, and the playoff championship, and won another Coach of the Year Trophy. Coventry was a founding member of the Elite Ice Hockey League for the 2003–2004 season. In the new league, Thompson led the team to third place, but lost in the playoff round robin. The 2004–2005 season, was Thompson's most successful with the Blaze. He led Coventry to the EIHL championship, the EIHL playoff championship, and the EIHL Challenge Cup championship. Thompson also won another Coach of the Year Trophy. Thompson repeated the EIHL Challenge Cup championship in the 2005–2006 season, but finished fourth place in the league, and lost in the playoff round robin. In the 2006–2007 season, Thompson led Coventry to a third consecutive EIHL Challenge Cup championship, won the EIHL championship, and lost in the playoff semifinals to miss out on another grand slam, however the Blaze won the British Knockout Cup. Thompson was awarded another IHJUK Coach of the Year for his efforts. In the 2007–2008 season, Thompson led Coventry to the EIHL Charity Shield finals, won the EIHL championship, lost in the playoff finals, and won a second British Knockout Cup. Thompson was named both the IHJUK Coach of the Year, and the EIHL Coach of the Year. In the 2008–2009 season, he led Coventry to the EIHL Charity Shield championship, finished 2nd place in the league, and a loss in the playoff semifinals. Thompson and Coventry won the EIHL championship in the 2009–2010 season, but lost in the playoff semifinals, and in the Hocktoberfest finals He won his eighth Coach of The Year award. In the 2010–2011 season, Thompson's team dropped to 6th place in the league, and a loss in the first round of the playoffs, but were finalists in the EIHL Charity Shield. He improved the team to 5th place in the 2011–2012 season, but still lost in the first round of the playoffs. In the 2012–2013 season, he again improved the team to 4th in the league, and reached the second round of the playoffs.

=== Later career ===
Thompson was the longest tenured head coach in British ice hockey when he announced his intentions to coach abroad in Europe for a new experience. Thompson joined Troja-Ljungby of the Allsvenskan league in Sweden for the 2013–2014 season. He was an assistant coach to Gunnar Leidborg, but with 12 games remaining he was promoted to head coach upon Leidborg's departure. The team was ultimately relegated to Hockeyettan after finished 13th in the season, and missing the top two spots in the qualifiers. Thompson stated he could have remained in Sweden, but wanted to move onto something else. Thompson moved to Denmark for the 2014–15 season, coaching the Aalborg Pirates of the Metal Ligaen. His team was primarily made of younger, local players. Aalborg finished eighth place in the season, and lost in the first round of the playoffs. After two years in Europe, Thompson returned to Great Britain, feeling that he learned a lot about hockey while abroad.

In April 2015, Thompson signed a two-year contract to be general manager and head coach of the Sheffield Steelers, and oversee the Under 20 programme. In the 2015–2016 season, Thompson led Sheffield to the EIHL championship, but were upset in the first round of the playoffs, by his old team Coventry. Thompson was awarded a ninth Coach of the Year Trophy, in his return to the EIHL. In the 2016–2017 season, he led the Steelers to third place in the league, won the EIHL playoff championship, and a spot in the EIHL Challenge Cup finals. On 12 April 2017, Thompson signed a two-year contract extension. In the 2017–2018 season, he led Sheffield to a third-place finish in the league, and reached the finals of the playoffs losing to the Cardiff Devils. Thompson resigned from his positions on 1 October 2018, citing personal reasons.

In November 2018, Thompson signed a one-year contract as head coach of the Schwenninger Wild Wings in the Deutsche Eishockey Liga, with a club option for a second year. In the 2018–2019 season, he led the Wild Wings to 49 points but placed 14th and last overall. In his second season with the Wild Wings, Thompson was fired on 16 December 2019, with the team in 14th place and last overall with only six wins in 26 games.

In October 2020, Thompson became head coach of the Unterland Cavaliers in Serie B of the Italian Hockey League.

Thompson was appointed as the head coach of the Odense Bulldogs in the Metal Ligaen in March 2021, on a contract until the end of the 2022–23 season.

In May 2025, the Cardiff Devils announced Thompson as their head coach.

=== Results and honours ===
As of 2018, Thompson is the winningest coach in the Elite Ice Hockey League, and has received nine Coach of the Year trophies in his career. His teams have won three Challenge Cups, two British Knockout Cups, and he is the first coach to win five Elite League titles. In the 2004–2005 season, Thompson completed the British Hockey Grand Slam; winning the Challenge Cup, the EIHL title, and the EIHL playoff championship.

Season	Team	League	Role(s)	Results	Awards / notes
1994–1995	Solihull Knights	BD2	Head coach	Youth team	
1995–1996	Solihull Knights	BD2	Head coach	Reserve team, promoted midseason	
1995–1996	Solihull Barons	BD1	Head coach	12th place, Division 1 Out of playoffs	Midseason appointment
1996–1997	Solihull Blaze	EPIHL	Head coach	2nd in EPIHL; Did not enter playoffs	
1997–1998	Solihull Blaze	ED1	Head coach	North conference champions National division champions National playoff champions	
1998–1999	Solihull Blaze	EPIHL	Head coach	EPIHL Champion; EPIHL playoff champion	
1999–2000	Solihull Blaze	BNL	Head coach	7th in league Lost in playoff quarterfinals	BNL Coach of the Year
2000–2001	Coventry Blaze	BNL	Head coach	4th in league Lost in playoff round-robin	BNL Coach of the Year
2001–2002	Coventry Blaze	BNL	Head coach	2nd in league Lost in playoff finals	
2002–2003	Coventry Blaze	BNL	Head coach	BNL Champion; BNL playoff champion	BNL Coach of the Year
2003–2004	Coventry Blaze	EIHL	Head coach	3rd in league Lost in playoff round robin	
2004–2005	Coventry Blaze	EIHL	Head coach	EIHL champions EIHL playoff champions EIHL Challenge Cup champions	IHJUK Coach of the Year
2005–2006	Coventry Blaze	EIHL	Head coach	4th in league Lost in playoff round robin EIHL Challenge Cup champions	
2006–2007	Coventry Blaze	EIHL	Head coach	EIHL champions Lost in playoff semifinals EIHL Challenge Cup champions British Knockout Cup champions	IHJUK Coach of the Year
2007–2008	Coventry Blaze	EIHL	Head coach	EIHL Charity Shield finalists EIHL champions Lost in playoff finals British Knockout Cup champions	IHJUK Coach of the Year; EIHL Coach of the Year
2008–2009	Coventry Blaze	EIHL	Head coach	EIHL Charity Shield champions 2nd in league Lost in playoff semifinals	
2009–2010	Coventry Blaze	EIHL	Head coach	EIHL champions Lost in playoff semifinals Lost in Hocktoberfest finals	EIHL Coach of The Year
2010–2011	Coventry Blaze	EIHL	Head coach	EIHL Charity Shield finalists 6th in league Lost in playoff quarterfinals	
2011–2012	Coventry Blaze	EIHL	Head coach	5th in league Lost in playoff quarterfinals	
2012–2013	Coventry Blaze	EIHL	Head coach	4th in league Lost in playoff semifinals	
2013–2014	Troja-Ljungby	Allsvenskan	Head coach	13th in league 3rd in Allsvenskan qualifiers Relegated to Hockeyettan	Midseason appointment
2014–2015	Aalborg Pirates	Metal Ligaen	Head coach	8th in league Lost in playoff quarterfinals	
2015–2016	Sheffield Steelers	EIHL	GM/head coach	EIHL champions Lost in playoff quarterfinals	IHJUK Coach of the Year
2016–2017	Sheffield Steelers	EIHL	GM/head coach	3rd in league EIHL playoff champions EIHL Challenge Cup finalists	
2017–2018	Sheffield Steelers	EIHL	GM/head coach	3rd in league Lost in playoff finals	
2018–2019	Sheffield Steelers	EIHL	GM/head coach	Resigned midseason, on 1 October 2018.	
2018–2019	Schwenninger Wild Wings	DEL	Head coach	14th in league Out of playoffs	Midseason appointment
2019–2020	Schwenninger Wild Wings	DEL	Head coach	Fired midseason, on 16 December 2019.	

== International duties ==
Thompson was an assistant coach for the men's national ice hockey team in 2001, and 2002, and later became head coach of the men's national team from 2006 to 2011. In his fifth season as head coach of Team Great Britain, the Lions almost earned promotion to the top tier of the Ice Hockey World Championships. Great Britain won its final game against Poland to move into first place in Group B, but earned a silver medal, when Kazakhstan scored a late goal against the host team Ukraine. Thompson planned on returning in 2012, but later resigned, and was replaced with Tony Hand.

Thompson headed a development forum for Ice Hockey UK, and led a proposal to create a domestic Under-20 League to develop the national talent pool. He believes that league structure used by the Danish Ice Hockey Union can be used for the Elite League, based on his experience coaching in the Metal Ligean. Thompson has stated a desire to give back to the English Ice Hockey Association, and was the keynote speaker, at the 2017 coaches conference hosted by the Junior League Management Committee, and the England National Team Programme.

=== International results ===
International results
Year	Team	Event	Role	Final standing
2001	Great Britain	WC D1	Asst. Coach	Silver, Group B
2002	Great Britain	WC D1	Asst. Coach	4th, Group B
2007	Great Britain	WC D1	Head coach	4th, Group B
2008	Great Britain	WC D1	Head coach	4th, Group A
2009	Great Britain	WC D1	Head coach	Bronze, Group B
2010	Great Britain	WC D1	Head coach	4th, Group B
2011	Great Britain	WC D1	Head coach	Silver, Group B

== Personal life ==
Thompson is married, and has a son who played junior ice hockey.

In 2004, Thompson co-authored the book Benched: Blazing a Trail Through British Ice Hockey, a biography about his life in ice hockey.

In 2008, he received a Lifetime Achievement Award from Coventry, Solihull & Warwickshire sports, and an honorary Doctor of Science by Coventry University.

== See also ==
- Ice hockey in the United Kingdom
