= Mark Richardson (ice hockey) =

British ice hockey player (born 1986)

- Born: 3 October 1986 (age 39) Swindon, England
- Height: 5 ft 11 in (180 cm)
- Weight: 187 lb (85 kg; 13 st 5 lb)
- Position: Defence
- Shoots: Right
- EIHL team Former teams: Cardiff Devils; Basingstoke Bison; Nottingham Panthers; Arlan Kokshetau; EC Bad Nauheim
- National team: Great Britain
- Playing career: 2002–present

Mark Richardson (born 3 October 1986) is an English professional ice hockey player who is a defenceman and captain for the Cardiff Devils of the Elite Ice Hockey League (EIHL).

== Playing career ==
Richardson began his career with his hometown team, the Swindon Lynx. In 2003, Richardson moved to the Bracknell Bees in two years. Richardson's good performances during the 2004–05 season, which included nine goals and 18 assists for 27 points, saw him move to the Elite League for the Cardiff Devils. His first season of 10 points in 30 games was impressive for an Elite League rookie, but his second season saw him collect 33 points, including 24 assists, in 54 games.

Richardson moved to the Nottingham Panthers in 2007, in what was a slightly disappointing season for him, but still managed to collect 20 points in 46 games. In 2008, Richardson signed with the Basingstoke Bison. Shortly after the end of the 2008–09 season, with Basingstoke dropping out of the Elite League, Richardson re-signed for the Cardiff Devils as a defenceman.

He moved briefly to Kazakhstan to sign for Arlan Kokshetau before re-joining Cardiff in 2012. He remained with Cardiff until 2020 but left the Elite League side over ongoing uncertainty about whether the 2020–21 Elite League season would go ahead.

On 8 September 2020, Richardson moved abroad for a second time, signing a one-year deal with German DEL2 team EC Bad Nauheim. The expectation is that Richardson will return to Cardiff in 2021.

In July 2021, the Cardiff Devils announced Richardson had signed terms for the 2021–22 season. He was named Cardiff captain in August 2021.

== International play ==
Richardson also plays internationally for Great Britain, reaching 100 caps at the 2022 IIHF World Championship.

== Personal life ==
He is the younger brother of Lee Richardson who also played ice hockey at a professional level.

== Career statistics ==
=== Regular season and playoffs ===
			Regular season					Playoffs
Season	Team	League	GP	G	A	Pts	PIM	GP	G	A	Pts	PIM
2001–02	England U20s	EPIHL	2	0	0	0	0	—	—	—	—	—
2001–02	Swindon Lynx	EPIHL	6	3	1	4	0	3	0	0	0	0
2002–03	Swindon Cougars	England U19	9	20	4	24	14	—	—	—	—	—
2002–03	Swindon Lynx	EPIHL	29	15	17	32	6	3	2	0	2	0
2002–03	Basingstoke Bison	BNL	0	0	0	0	0	1	0	0	0	0
2003–04	Bracknell Bees	BNL	32	5	5	10	4	11	4	5	9	16
2004–05	Bracknell Bees	BNL	35	10	18	28	4	11	2	3	5	2
2005–06	Cardiff Devils	EIHL	30	4	6	10	0	7	0	2	2	2
2006–07	Cardiff Devils	EIHL	54	9	24	33	10	4	0	0	0	0
2007–08	Nottingham Panthers	EIHL	37	7	10	17	16	2	0	0	0	0
2008–09	Basingstoke Bison	EIHL	17	2	2	4	4	—	—	—	—	—
2008–09	Nottingham Panthers	EIHL	40	4	4	8	8	4	0	1	1	2
2009–10	Cardiff Devils	EIHL	56	5	18	23	22	4	0	2	2	2
2010–11	Cardiff Devils	EIHL	47	4	17	21	22	4	0	3	3	2
2011–12	Cardiff Devils	EIHL	54	7	23	30	22	4	0	0	0	0
2012–13	Arlan Kokshetau	Kazakhstan	13	1	3	4	8	—	—	—	—	—
2012–13	Cardiff Devils	EIHL	31	3	11	14	12	4	2	3	5	0
2013–14	Cardiff Devils	EIHL	40	5	10	15	6	—	—	—	—	—
2014–15	Cardiff Devils	EIHL	52	5	10	15	8	2	0	0	0	0
2015–16	Cardiff Devils	EIHL	52	3	10	13	12	4	0	0	0	0
2016–17	Cardiff Devils	EIHL	52	8	20	28	12	4	0	0	0	2
2017–18	Cardiff Devils	EIHL	52	6	16	22	8	4	0	0	0	2
2018–19	Cardiff Devils	EIHL	52	7	22	29	8	4	2	2	4	0
2019–20	Cardiff Devils	EIHL	46	4	12	16	8	—	—	—	—	—
2020–21	EC Bad Nauheim	DEL2	38	1	10	11	2	—	—	—	—	—
2021–22	Cardiff Devils	EIHL	54	4	15	19	10	4	0	2	2	0
2022–23	Cardiff Devils	EIHL	53	2	12	14	8	4	1	0	1	0
2023–24	Cardiff Devils	EIHL	52	0	11	11	4	4	0	0	0	0
2024–25	Cardiff Devils	EIHL	50	0	9	9	6	4	0	1	1	0
2025–26	Cardiff Devils	EIHL	52	0	9	9	6	4	0	0	0	0
EIHL totals			973	89	271	360	212	71	5	16	21	12

=== International ===
Year	Team	Event	GP	G	A	Pts	PIM
2003	Great Britain U20	WJC-20 (D2)	5	1	1	2	0
2003	Great Britain U18	WJC-18 (D1)	5	3	0	3	0
2004	Great Britain U20	WJC-20 (D2)	5	1	5	6	4
2004	Great Britain U18	WJC-18 (D2)	5	0	0	0	10
2005	Great Britain U20	WJC-20 (D1)	5	1	2	3	0
2005	Great Britain	WC (D1)	5	1	0	1	0
2006	Great Britain U20	WJC-20 (D2)	5	3	4	7	6
2006	Great Britain	WC (D1)	5	0	0	0	0
2007	Great Britain	WC (D1)	5	1	0	1	0
2008	Great Britain	OGQ	3	1	1	2	0
2009	Great Britain	WC (D1)	5	0	0	0	0
2010	Great Britain	WC (D1)	5	0	1	1	2
2011	Great Britain	WC (D1)	5	0	1	1	6
2012	Great Britain	WC (D1A)	5	0	2	2	2
2013	Great Britain	OGQ	6	0	0	0	0
2013	Great Britain	WC (D1A)	5	0	2	2	0
2014	Great Britain	WC (D1B)	5	0	0	0	0
2015	Great Britain	WC (D1B)	5	2	0	2	0
2016	Great Britain	OGQ	3	1	1	2	2
2016	Great Britain	WC (D1B)	5	0	1	1	0
2017	Great Britain	WC (D1B)	5	0	3	3	0
2018	Great Britain	WC (D1A)	5	0	3	3	2
2019	Great Britain	WC	7	0	1	1	0
2020	Great Britain	OGQ	3	0	1	1	0
2021	Great Britain	WC	7	0	4	4	0
2022	Great Britain	WC	6	1	0	1	0
2023	Great Britain	WC (D1A)	5	0	0	0	2
2024	Great Britain	WC	7	0	0	0	0
2024	Great Britain	OGQ	6	1	3	4	0
2025	Great Britain	WC (D1A)	5	0	0	0	2
2026	Great Britain	WC	7	0	1	1	2
Junior totals			30	9	12	21	20
Senior totals			130	8	25	33	20
