= Lukáš Komárek =

Slovak ice hockey player

- Born: April 29, 1982 (age 42); Skalica, Czechoslovakia
- Height: 6 ft 0 in (183 cm)
- Weight: 176 lb (80 kg; 12 st 8 lb)
- Position: Defence
- Shot: Right
- Played for: HK 36 Skalica; Cardiff Devils
- Playing career: 2000–2014

Lukáš Komárek (born April 29, 1982) is a Slovak former professional ice hockey defenceman.

Komárek played 216 games for HK 36 Skalica of the Slovak Extraliga between 2000 and 2006. He then signed for the Cardiff Devils of the Elite Ice Hockey League for the 2006–07 EIHL season winning the British Knockout Cup with the team.
