= Brad Voth =

Canadian ice hockey player

- Born: February 25, 1980 (age 46) Calgary, Alberta, Canada
- Height: 6 ft 5 in (196 cm)
- Weight: 229 lb (104 kg; 16 st 5 lb)
- Position: Winger
- Shot: Right
- Played for: Worcester IceCats; Peoria Rivermen; Columbus Cottonmouths; Texas Wildcatters; Cardiff Devils
- NHL draft: 157th overall, 1998; St. Louis Blues
- Playing career: 2001–2012

Brad Voth (born February 25, 1980) is a Canadian former professional ice hockey player.

== Career ==
Voth played junior hockey with the Medicine Hat Tigers in the Western Hockey League from 1996 to 2001. In the 1998 NHL entry draft he was selected 157th overall in the 6th round by St. Louis Blues. He spent two season with the Blues organization, playing for their American Hockey League affiliate the Worcester IceCats and their ECHL affiliate the Peoria Rivermen. After being released by the Blues in 2003, Voth spent a further two seasons in the ECHL, spending the 2003-04 season with the Columbus Cottonmouths and the 2004-05 season with the Texas Wildcatters.

In 2005, Voth moved to the United Kingdom and signed for the Cardiff Devils of the Elite Ice Hockey League. An imposing figure at 6'5” and 235 lbs, Voth played tough hockey, in a style not always seen in the EIHL. His role in the Cardiff Devils was an enforcer, demonstrated by his significant penalty minutes (PIM) totals during his stint, a total 1,762 in exactly 300 EIHL league games and was the EIHL's Most Penalised Player four out of his five years in the league. However, Voth was also an offensive presence within the team, eventually scoring 209 points for the Devils. His standout season was the 2007-08 season, when he scored 24 goals and 16 assists for 40 points in 50 games. He was also named captain of the team in January 2007 and held it for three years before being relieved of it in February 2010.

Voth sustained a nerve injury in a game against the Belfast Giants in December 2011 and sat out for several weeks until 4 February 2012 when Cardiff announced that Voth would retire with immediate effect and would begin work with the Fire Service.

Following his retirement, his jersey number #26 was retired by the Devils.

== Career statistics ==
Season	Team	Lge	GP	G	A	Pts	PIM
1996-97	Medicine Hat Tigers	WHL	2	0	0	0	2
1997-98	Medicine Hat Tigers	WHL	70	8	5	13	244
1998-99	Medicine Hat Tigers	WHL	40	4	6	10	102
1999-00	Medicine Hat Tigers	WHL	58	9	7	16	222
2000-01	Medicine Hat Tigers	WHL	45	9	9	18	215
2001-02	Worcester Ice Cats	AHL	10	0	0	0	27
2001-02	Peoria Rivermen	ECHL	32	0	4	4	134
2002-03	Worcester Ice Cats	AHL	10	0	0	0	27
2002-03	Peoria Rivermen	ECHL	54	1	4	5	283
2003-04	Columbus Cottonmouths	ECHL	62	6	13	19	209
2004-05	Texas Wildcatters	ECHL	29	8	5	13	96
2005-06	Cardiff Devils	EIHL	45	9	12	21	263
2006-07	Cardiff Devils	EIHL	41	11	11	22	253
2007-08	Cardiff Devils	EIHL	50	24	16	40	288
2008-09	Cardiff Devils	EIHL	42	13	25	38	315
2009-10	Cardiff Devils	EIHL	50	12	21	33	347
2010-11	Cardiff Devils	EIHL	47	22	16	38	194
2011-12	Cardiff Devils	EIHL	25	5	12	17	102

== Career highlights ==
- 2005-06 EIHL Challenge Cup
- 2006-07 British Knockout Cup
