= Brodie Dupont =

Canadian professional ice hockey forward

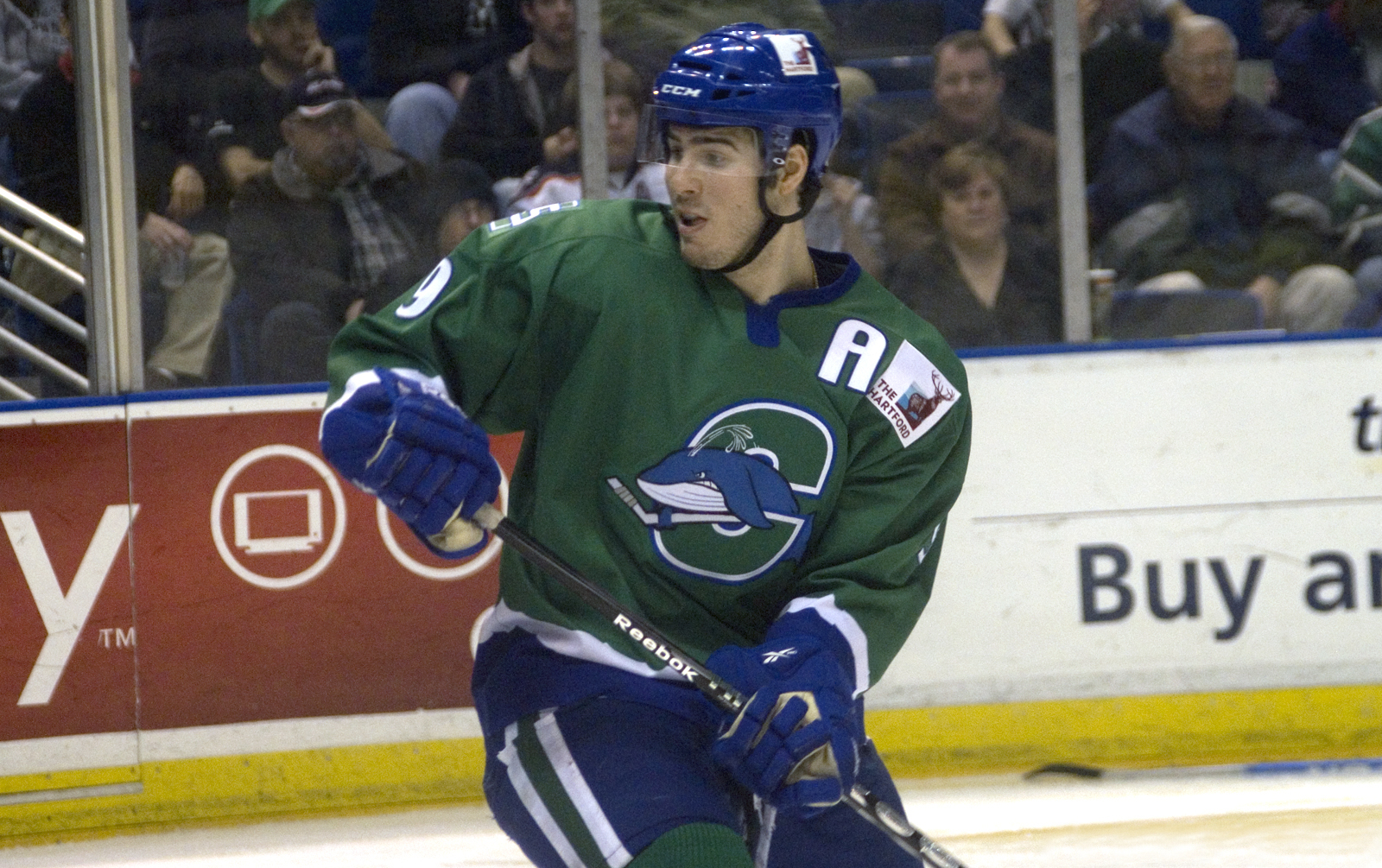
- Dupont while with the Connecticut Whale
- Born: February 17, 1987 (age 39) Russell, Manitoba, Canada
- Height: 6 ft 2 in (188 cm)
- Weight: 210 lb (95 kg; 15 st 0 lb)
- Position: Centre
- Shot: Left
- Played for: New York Rangers; HC Valpellice; Iserlohn Roosters; Dornbirn Bulldogs; Herning Blue Fox; Cardiff Devils
- NHL draft: 66th overall, 2005; New York Rangers
- Playing career: 2007–2022

Brodie Dupont (born February 17, 1987) is a Canadian former professional ice hockey forward and current coach. He was most recently head coach of the UK Elite Ice Hockey League (EIHL) side Cardiff Devils where he won the championship his first year as head coach. He is now currently the director and head coach of bishops college where he has won 3 leagues championships and coach of the year all within a few years. He was drafted in the 3rd round, 66th overall by the New York Rangers in the 2005 NHL entry draft.

== Playing career ==
After playing in the American Hockey League (AHL) with the Hartford Wolfpack for more than three seasons, Dupont was first called up to the New York Rangers on January 19, 2011 and made his NHL debut on January 22, playing seven shifts during a 3–2 shoot-out win over the Atlanta Thrashers.

On July 2, 2011, he was traded by the Rangers to the Nashville Predators for Andreas Thuresson.

After parts of three seasons abroad with the German club, Iserlohn Roosters of the Deutsche Eishockey Liga, Dupont returned to North America in initially signing with ECHL club, the Norfolk Admirals. As captain of the club in the 2016–17 season, Dupont was the leading point scorer with 41 in 40 games before he was signed to a professional tryout (PTO) contract with AHL affiliate, the Bakersfield Condors. After concluding the regular season with 21 games with Bakersfield, his ECHL rights were traded to the Greenville Swamp Rabbits, with whom he played 2 post-season games.

As a free agent in the following off-season, Dupont returned to the Norfolk Admirals, securing a one-year deal on September 21, 2017. Regaining his role as team captain through the 2017–18 season, Dupont led the club in scoring at a point-per game rate through 68 appearances. He also had a one-game PTO stint with the Stockton Heat of the AHL.

On July 9, 2018, Dupont left the Admirals for a second time, agreeing to a one-year contract with the Austrian club, Dornbirn Bulldogs of the Austrian Hockey League (EBEL).

== Later years and coaching career ==
After two years in Denmark with Herning Blue Fox, Dupont agreed terms with UK EIHL side Cardiff Devils for the 2021–22 season - joining as player/assistant coach.

In April 2022, Dupont - alongside Cardiff assistant coach Neil Francis - took interim charge until the end of the season following the departure of head coach Jarrod Skalde. Dupont then led Cardiff to the 2022 Elite League play-off championship with a 6–3 win over Belfast Giants in the final.

In May 2022, Cardiff confirmed the appointment of Dupont as their permanent head coach. As a result, Dupont retired from playing.

However, in April 2023, Dupont and assistant coach Christian Horn left Cardiff after one full season in charge. Dupont led Cardiff to 4th in the league standings, and to the runners-up spot in the Elite League play-offs.

== Personal ==
Dupont was born in Russell, Manitoba, but grew up in St. Lazare, Manitoba. On July 6, 2013, Brodie Dupont married Kayleen Kelly. Brody now resides with Kayleen and his two children in the town of Hampton, New Brunswick, Canada.

== Career statistics ==
=== Regular season and playoffs ===
| | | | Regular season | | | | | Playoffs |
| Season | Team | League | GP | G | A | Pts | PIM | GP | G | A | Pts | PIM |
|---|---|---|---|---|---|---|---|---|---|---|---|---|
| 2003–04 | Swan Valley Stampeders | MJHL | 51 | 25 | 16 | 41 | 88 | 12 | 5 | 1 | 6 | 36 |
| 2003–04 | Calgary Hitmen | WHL | 2 | 0 | 1 | 1 | 0 | — | — | — | — | — |
| 2004–05 | Calgary Hitmen | WHL | 70 | 14 | 11 | 25 | 111 | 12 | 2 | 8 | 10 | 21 |
| 2005–06 | Calgary Hitmen | WHL | 72 | 30 | 23 | 53 | 123 | 13 | 4 | 5 | 9 | 24 |
| 2006–07 | Calgary Hitmen | WHL | 70 | 37 | 33 | 70 | 90 | 18 | 9 | 7 | 16 | 33 |
| 2007–08 | Hartford Wolf Pack | AHL | 66 | 9 | 13 | 22 | 75 | 1 | 0 | 0 | 0 | 0 |
| 2008–09 | Hartford Wolf Pack | AHL | 79 | 18 | 24 | 42 | 112 | 6 | 0 | 2 | 2 | 15 |
| 2009–10 | Hartford Wolf Pack | AHL | 80 | 17 | 22 | 39 | 124 | — | — | — | — | — |
| 2010–11 | Hartford Wolf Pack/CT Whale | AHL | 72 | 14 | 31 | 45 | 78 | 6 | 1 | 2 | 3 | 6 |
| 2010–11 | New York Rangers | NHL | 1 | 0 | 0 | 0 | 0 | — | — | — | — | — |
| 2011–12 | Milwaukee Admirals | AHL | 41 | 7 | 7 | 14 | 31 | 3 | 1 | 0 | 1 | 2 |
| 2012–13 | HC Valpellice | ITA | 37 | 16 | 24 | 40 | 60 | 16 | 3 | 14 | 17 | 40 |
| 2013–14 | Hartford Wolf Pack | AHL | 26 | 1 | 5 | 6 | 25 | — | — | — | — | — |
| 2013–14 | Iserlohn Roosters | DEL | 13 | 2 | 6 | 8 | 6 | 9 | 2 | 2 | 4 | 8 |
| 2014–15 | Iserlohn Roosters | DEL | 47 | 11 | 21 | 32 | 91 | 6 | 2 | 2 | 4 | 12 |
| 2015–16 | Iserlohn Roosters | DEL | 28 | 5 | 8 | 13 | 8 | 6 | 2 | 1 | 3 | 29 |
| 2016–17 | Norfolk Admirals | ECHL | 40 | 16 | 25 | 41 | 16 | — | — | — | — | — |
| 2016–17 | Bakersfield Condors | AHL | 21 | 2 | 6 | 8 | 23 | — | — | — | — | — |
| 2016–17 | Greenville Swamp Rabbits | ECHL | — | — | — | — | — | 2 | 0 | 1 | 1 | 2 |
| 2017–18 | Norfolk Admirals | ECHL | 68 | 21 | 47 | 68 | 38 | — | — | — | — | — |
| 2017–18 | Stockton Heat | AHL | 1 | 0 | 0 | 0 | 0 | — | — | — | — | — |
| 2018–19 | Dornbirn Bulldogs | AUT | 51 | 11 | 24 | 35 | 26 | — | — | — | — | — |
| 2019–20 | Herning Blue Fox | DEN | 41 | 12 | 11 | 23 | 48 | — | — | — | — | — |
| 2020–21 | Herning Blue Fox | DEN | 41 | 21 | 22 | 43 | 30 | 4 | 0 | 2 | 2 | 6 |
| 2021–22 | Cardiff Devils | EIHL | 19 | 3 | 6 | 9 | 8 | — | — | — | — | — |
| AHL totals | | | 386 | 68 | 108 | 176 | 468 | 16 | 2 | 4 | 6 | 23 |
| NHL totals | | | 1 | 0 | 0 | 0 | 0 | — | — | — | — | — |
| DEL totals | | | 88 | 18 | 35 | 53 | 105 | 21 | 6 | 5 | 11 | 49 |

=== International ===
| Year | Team | Event | GP | G | A | Pts | PIM |
|---|---|---|---|---|---|---|---|
| 2004 | Canada Western | U17 | 5 | 1 | 2 | 3 | 4 |
| Junior totals | | | 5 | 1 | 2 | 3 | 4 |

== See also ==
- List of players who played only one game in the NHL
