= Andrew Lord (ice hockey) =

Canadian ice hockey player and coach

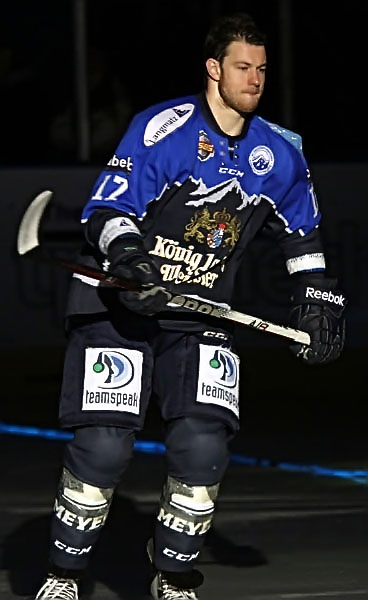
- Born: February 22, 1985 (age 40) West Vancouver, British Columbia, Canada
- Height: 6 ft 3 in (191 cm)
- Weight: 200 lb (91 kg; 14 st 4 lb)
- Position: Centre
- Shot: Right
- Played for: Wheeling Nailers; Rochester Americans; Milwaukee Admirals; Oklahoma City Barons; SC Riessersee; Cardiff Devils
- NHL draft: Undrafted
- Playing career: 2008–2018

Andrew Lord (born February 22, 1985) is a Canadian former professional ice hockey player and current head coach for the Ontario Reign of the American Hockey League.

== Early life and education ==
Lord was born in West Vancouver. He attended the Rensselaer Polytechnic Institute (RPI) in Troy, New York, from 2004 to 2008, where he played collegiately for the RPI Engineers and earned a bachelor's degree in business management.

== Professional career ==
Lord launched his professional career in the ECHL, where he spent two and a half years with the Wheeling Nailers, before moving to the American Hockey League (AHL), signing with the Oklahoma City Barons in late December 2010. He had to sit out the 2011-12 season with an injury.

In 2012, Lord headed overseas to Germany and signed a deal with SC Riessersee of 2nd Eishockey-Bundesliga. After spending one year in Germany, he signed with the Cardiff Devils of the Elite Ice Hockey League (EIHL) for the 2013–14 season. Showing his scoring ability, he tallied 23 goals and 36 assists in 60 games during his first year there.

Prior to his second year with the Devils (2014–15), he accepted the position as player/coach and kept his scoring hot, chipping in with 23 goals and 38 assists in 62 contests, guiding his team to the EIHL Challenge Cup title and a third-place finish in the EIHL, while receiving All-EIHL Coach of the Year honors.

== Coaching career ==
Lord retired from playing in 2018, reverting to the sole title of head coach for the Cardiff Devils.

On 19 June 2020, the team announced that Lord would be leaving after seven years, six as coach, in order to pursue another coaching opportunity in North America. Later that same day, Lord was announced as the new head coach of the ECHL's Greenville Swamp Rabbits. In 2021, he was likewise given the title of general manager with the team. Lord was awarded the John Brophy Award as ECHL Coach of the Year in 2024.

On 14 June 2024, Lord was announced as the 14th head coach of the Halifax Mooseheads in franchise history.

After one season with Halifax, Lord was hired as head coach of the American Hockey League's Ontario Reign.

== Career statistics ==
=== Regular season and playoffs ===
			Regular season					Playoffs
Season	Team	League	GP	G	A	Pts	PIM	GP	G	A	Pts	PIM
2004–05	RPI	ECAC	33	4	5	9	21	—	—	—	—	—
2005–06	RPI	ECAC	32	7	6	13	20	—	—	—	—	—
2006–07	RPI	ECAC	32	2	5	7	16	—	—	—	—	—
2007–08	RPI	ECAC	37	6	10	16	57	—	—	—	—	—
2008–09	Wheeling Nailers	ECHL	69	18	31	49	138	7	0	3	3	7
2009–10	Wheeling Nailers	ECHL	70	17	19	36	185	—	—	—	—	—
2009–10	Rochester Americans	AHL	3	0	0	0	17	—	—	—	—	—
2010–11	Wheeling Nailers	ECHL	26	7	12	19	74	8	1	1	2	2
2010–11	Milwaukee Admirals	AHL	2	0	0	0	5	—	—	—	—	—
2010–11	Oklahoma City Barons	AHL	34	1	6	7	89	—	—	—	—	—
2012–13	SC Riessersee	2.GBun	42	8	14	22	109	—	—	—	—	—
2013–14	Cardiff Devils	EIHL	49	17	30	47	49	—	—	—	—	—
2014–15	Cardiff Devils	EIHL	50	18	31	49	53	—	—	—	—	—
2015–16	Cardiff Devils	EIHL	52	10	29	39	17	—	—	—	—	—
2016–17	Cardiff Devils	EIHL	40	16	12	28	28	—	—	—	—	—
2017–18	Cardiff Devils	EIHL	25	2	8	10	12	—	—	—	—	—
AHL totals			39	1	6	7	111	—	—	—	—	—
ECHL totals			165	42	62	104	397	15	1	4	5	9
NCAA totals			134	19	26	45	114	—	—	—	—	—
