= Tyson Marsh =

Canadian ice hockey player

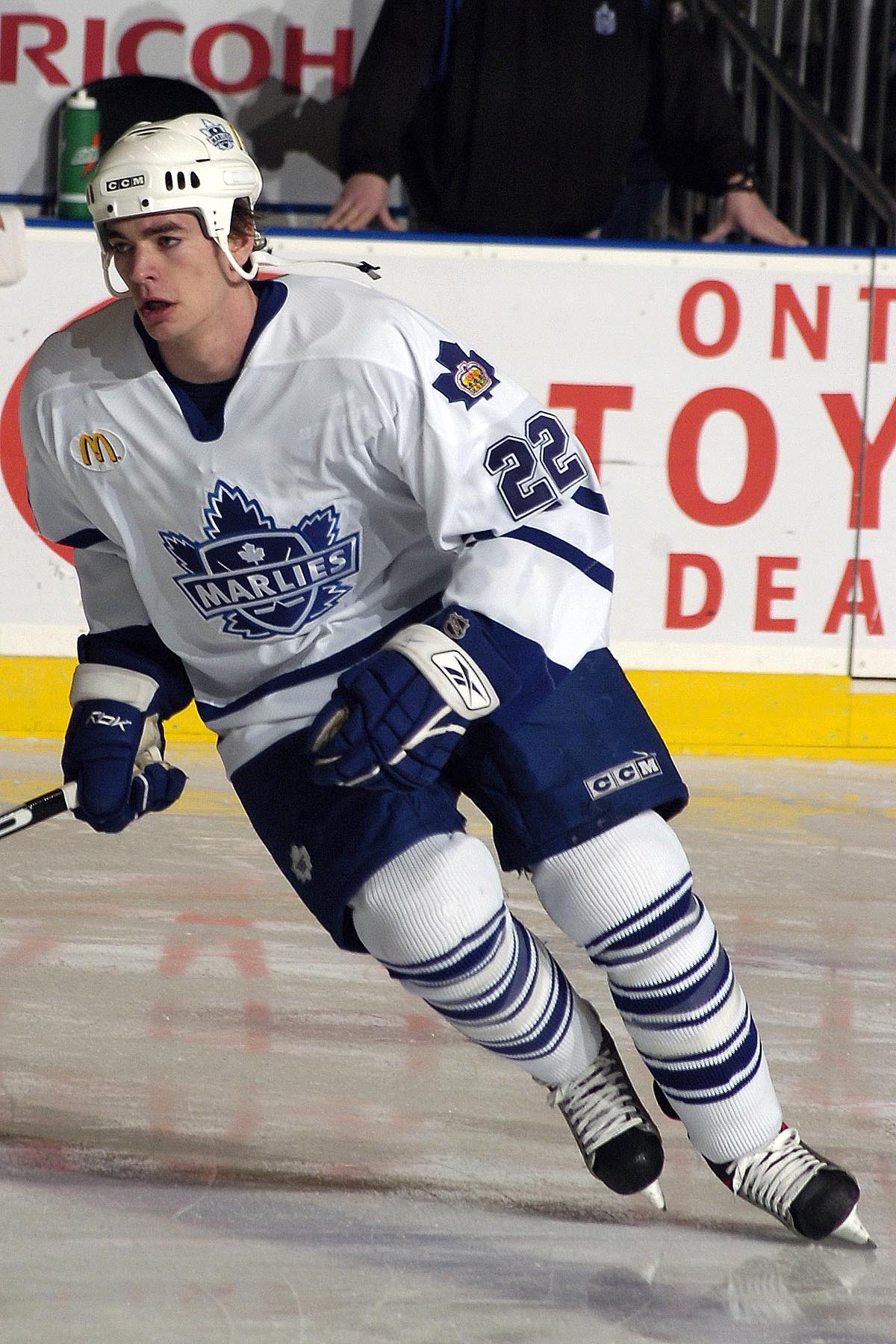
- Marsh with the Toronto Marlies in 2006
- Born: June 20, 1984 (age 42) Quesnel, British Columbia, Canada
- Height: 6 ft 1 in (185 cm)
- Weight: 214 lb (97 kg; 15 st 4 lb)
- Position: Defence
- Shot: Left
- Played for: St. John's Maple Leafs; Pensacola Ice Pilots; Toronto Marlies; Columbia Inferno; Rockford IceHogs; Reading Royals; Chicago Wolves; Alaska Aces; Alleghe Hockey; SC Riessersee; Cardiff Devils
- Playing career: 2004–2016

Tyson Marsh (born June 20, 1984) is a Canadian former professional ice hockey defenceman who last played for the Cardiff Devils in the Elite Ice Hockey League in the United Kingdom.

== Career statistics ==
			Regular season					Playoffs
Season	Team	League	GP	G	A	Pts	PIM	GP	G	A	Pts	PIM
2000–01	Quesnel Millionaires	BCHL	52	4	2	6	19	5	1	2	3	0
2001–02	Vancouver Giants	WHL	69	2	14	16	85	—	—	—	—	—
2002–03	Vancouver Giants	WHL	68	3	15	18	143	3	0	1	1	4
2003–04	Vancouver Giants	WHL	67	3	18	21	102	11	0	3	3	4
2004–05	Vancouver Giants	WHL	1	0	0	0	0	—	—	—	—	—
2004–05	St. John's Maple Leafs	AHL	21	0	1	1	30	—	—	—	—	—
2004–05	Pensacola Ice Pilots	ECHL	23	1	2	3	29	4	0	0	0	2
2005–06	Toronto Marlies	AHL	12	0	0	0	23	—	—	—	—	—
2006–07	Toronto Marlies	AHL	1	0	1	1	5	—	—	—	—	—
2006–07	Columbia Inferno	ECHL	48	2	19	21	97	—	—	—	—	—
2007–08	Columbia Inferno	ECHL	61	3	14	17	126	—	—	—	—	—
2007–08	Rockford IceHogs	AHL	11	2	2	4	19	12	0	2	2	4
2008–09	Chicago Wolves	AHL	29	1	5	6	29	—	—	—	—	—
2008–09	Reading Royals	ECHL	8	0	3	3	16	—	—	—	—	—
2008–09	Alaska Aces	ECHL	—	—	—	—	—	19	1	0	1	30
2009–10	Alaska Aces	ECHL	30	6	7	13	20	4	0	0	0	6
2010–11	HC Alleghe	Italy	40	10	9	19	60	5	0	0	0	12
2011–12	SC Riessersee	Germany2	16	2	1	3	28	—	—	—	—	—
2011–12	Alaska Aces	ECHL	33	1	6	7	47	10	1	2	3	8
2012–13	Cardiff Devils	EIHL	46	4	18	22	85	4	0	2	2	2
2013–14	Cardiff Devils	EIHL	52	7	28	35	89	—	—	—	—	—
2014–15	Cardiff Devils	EIHL	51	8	21	29	82	2	0	0	0	0
2015–16	Cardiff Devils	EIHL	26	2	5	7	49	4	0	2	2	0
AHL totals			74	3	9	12	106	12	0	2	2	4
ECHL totals			203	13	51	64	335	37	2	2	4	46

He currently serves as the head coach of the U11 AA Halton Hills Thunder, a representative youth hockey team that competes in the Tri‑County Minor Hockey League (TCMHL) under the Ontario Minor Hockey Association (OMHA)
