= Ontario Reign =

American Hockey League team in Ontario, California

- City: Ontario, California
- League: American Hockey League
- Conference: Western
- Division: Pacific
- Founded: 2001
- Home arena: Toyota Arena
- Colors: Black, Inland Blue, Empire Gold, White, Gray
- Owner: Anschutz Entertainment Group
- General manager: Nelson Emerson
- Head coach: Andrew Lord
- Captain: Joe Hicketts
- Media: Inland Valley Daily Bulletin; FloHockey (TV Internet); Mixlr (Radio Internet)
- Affiliates: Los Angeles Kings (NHL); Greenville Swamp Rabbits (ECHL)

Franchise history
- 2001–2015: Manchester Monarchs
- 2015–present: Ontario Reign

Championships
- Division titles: 2 (2015–16, 2025–26)
- Calder Cups: 1 (2014–15)

The Ontario Reign are a professional ice hockey team based in Ontario, California. They are the American Hockey League (AHL) affiliate of the National Hockey League's Los Angeles Kings. The team plays its home games at the Toyota Arena.

The franchise is a relocation of the former Manchester Monarchs AHL franchise when several other franchises created a Pacific Division in 2015. The team is owned by the Anschutz Entertainment Group. The Reign replaced the ECHL team of the same name, which played from 2008 until 2015, after which they moved to Manchester, New Hampshire, to play as the Manchester Monarchs.

== History ==
On January 29, 2015, the Los Angeles Kings announced that they would be moving their AHL affiliate, the Manchester Monarchs, to Ontario as one of five charter members of the AHL's new Pacific Division. The team retained the Reign nickname from its ECHL predecessor (which moved to Manchester and took on the Monarchs moniker, in essentially a "franchise swap"). The Reign's AHL logo, based on the Kings' late 1980s-early 1990s "Chevy" logo, was unveiled on Wednesday, February 11. The franchise retained head coach Mike Stothers during the move from Manchester.

In its inaugural season in California, the Reign won the first Pacific Division regular season title with a 44–19–4–1 record. Goaltender Peter Budaj was named to the 2015–16 AHL First All-Star Team and was selected as the league top goaltender with the Baz Bastien Memorial Award. Sean Backman lead the team in scoring with 21 goals and 34 assists while playing all 68 games for the Reign. The Reign would also win the division in the playoffs, defeating the San Jose Barracuda three-games-to-one and the San Diego Gulls four-games-to-one. In the conference finals, the Reign were swept by the eventual Calder Cup champion Lake Erie Monsters in four games.

During the next season in 2016–17, due to goaltender injuries and call-ups for their parent club, the Los Angeles Kings, the Reign ended up using a Canadian father-son duo Dusty and Jonah Imoo during a game in October 2016. Dusty Imoo (age 46) was a goaltending consultant with the Kings. Jonah (age 22) made his AHL debut on a tryout contract. Both the Imoos had grown up in Surrey, British Columbia. By the end of the season, the Reign qualified for the playoffs in third place in the Pacific Division, losing in the first round to San Diego.

The 2019–20 season was curtailed by the onset of the COVID-19 pandemic in March 2020. During the offseason, Stothers' contract was not renewed and was replaced by John Wroblewski as the new head coach. Approaching the delayed 2020–21 season, the Reign announced they would temporarily relocate and play out of the Kings' practice rink, Toyota Sports Center, in El Segundo due to pandemic-related restrictions. The Sports Center hosted all the Reign's home games closed to spectators.

Marco Sturm was named the Reign’s new head coach prior to the 2022–23 season and would lead the team to three consecutive trips to the Calder Cup Playoffs before being hired as head coach of the Boston Bruins on June 5, 2025. Andrew Lord succeeded Sturm and coached the Reign to a first-place finish in the Pacific Division in 2025–26.

On June 13, 2026, the Reign unveiled a new logo and jerseys, moving from a black-and-silver color scheme to primarily purple ("Inland Blue") and gold ("Empire Gold") as well as a redo of the Kings crown but with several motor motifs to pay tribute to the Ontario Motor Speedway that Toyota Arena was built on the site of.

== Season-by-season records ==
First Ontario Reign (AHL) logo 2015 - 2026

| Regular season | | | | | | | | | | | Playoffs | | | | | |
| Season | GP | W | L | OTL | SOL | Pts | PCT | GF | GA | Standing | Year | Prelims | 1st round | 2nd round | 3rd round | Finals |
|---|---|---|---|---|---|---|---|---|---|---|---|---|---|---|---|---|
| 2015–16 | 68 | 44 | 19 | 4 | 1 | 93 | .684 | 192 | 138 | 1st, Pacific | 2016 | — | W, 3–1, SJ | W, 4–1, SD | L, 0–4, LE | — |
| 2016–17 | 68 | 36 | 21 | 10 | 1 | 83 | .610 | 199 | 190 | 3rd, Pacific | 2017 | — | L, 2–3, SD | — | — | — |
| 2017–18 | 68 | 36 | 25 | 4 | 3 | 79 | .581 | 200 | 194 | 3rd, Pacific | 2018 | — | L, 1–3, TEX | — | — | — |
| 2018–19 | 68 | 25 | 33 | 6 | 4 | 60 | .441 | 213 | 274 | 7th, Pacific | 2019 | Did not qualify | | | | |
| 2019–20 | 57 | 29 | 22 | 5 | 1 | 64 | .561 | 166 | 198 | 5th, Pacific | 2020 | Season cancelled due to the COVID-19 pandemic | | | | |
| 2020–21 | 40 | 17 | 19 | 4 | 0 | 38 | .475 | 136 | 149 | 6th, Pacific | 2021 (Note: The 2021 Calder Cup playoffs were not held; the Pacific Division held a postseason tournament for the division title. The bottom four teams had single-elimination play-in games to qualify for the semifinals (the first two rounds). The division semifinals and finals were best-of-three for the John D. Chick Trophy (the last two rounds).) | — | OTL, 4–5, COL | — | — | — |
| 2021–22 | 68 | 41 | 18 | 5 | 4 | 91 | .669 | 259 | 219 | 2nd, Pacific | 2022 | W, 2–0, SD | L, 0–3, COL | — | — | — |
| 2022–23 | 72 | 34 | 32 | 5 | 1 | 74 | .514 | 206 | 211 | 6th, Pacific | 2023 | L, 0–2, COL | — | — | — | — |
| 2023–24 | 72 | 42 | 23 | 3 | 4 | 91 | .632 | 231 | 198 | 3rd, Pacific | 2024 | W, 2–0, BAK | W, 3–0, ABB | L, 0–3, CV | — | — |
| 2024–25 | 72 | 43 | 25 | 3 | 1 | 90 | .625 | 225 | 207 | 3rd, Pacific | 2025 | L, 0–2, SJ | — | — | — | — |
| 2025–26 | 72 | 47 | 20 | 3 | 2 | 99 | .688 | 237 | 187 | 1st, Pacific | 2026 | BYE | L, 2–3, CV | — | — | — |

== Players ==
=== Current roster ===
Updated November 2, 2026.

| No. | Nat | Player | Pos | S/G | Age | Acquired | Birthplace | Contract |
|---|---|---|---|---|---|---|---|---|
| 24 | (Canada) | Angus Booth | D | L | 22 | 2024 | Montreal, Quebec | Kings |
| 2 | (United States) | Henry Brzustewicz | D | R | 19 | 2026 | Washington, Michigan | Kings |
| 17 | (United States) | Kenny Connors | C | L | 23 | 2025 | Glen Mills, Pennsylvania | Kings |
| 37 | (United States) | Jacob Doty | RW/C | R | 33 | 2019 | Denver, Colorado | Reign |
| 55 | (Czech Republic) | Jakub Dvorak | D | L | 21 | 2024 | Liberec, Czech Republic | Kings |
| 70 | (Canada) | Carter George | G | L | 20 | 2026 | Thunder Bay, Ontario | Kings |
| 81 | (United States) | Cole Guttman (A) | C | R | 27 | 2025 | Northridge, California | Kings |
| 27 | (Canada) | Joe Hicketts (C) | D | L | 30 | 2023 | Kamloops, British Columbia | Kings |
| 47 | (United States) | Jack Hughes | C | L | 23 | 2025 | Westwood, Massachusetts | Reign |
| 46 | (Japan) | Kenta Isogai | LW | L | 22 | 2025 | Nagano, Japan | Reign |
| 86 | (Finland) | Aatu Jamsen | RW | L | 24 | 2024 | Lahti, Finland | Kings |
| 19 | (Russia) | Kirill Kirsanov | D | L | 24 | 2025 | Tver, Russia | Kings |
| 22 | (Canada) | Kaleb Lawrence | C | L | 23 | 2024 | Ottawa, Ontario | Kings |
| 14 | (Canada) | Michael Mastrodomenico | D | L | 22 | 2026 | Kirkland, Quebec | Reign |
| 45 | (United States) | Jack Millar | D | R | 25 | 2024 | Westminster, Colorado | Reign |
| 29 | (Canada) | Lane Pederson (A) | C | R | 29 | 2026 | Saskatoon, Saskatchewan | Kings |
| 7 | (United States) | Scott Perunovich | D | L | 28 | 2026 | Hibbing, Minnesota | Kings |
| 71 | (Canada) | Francesco Pinelli | C | L | 23 | 2023 | Hamilton, Ontario | Kings |
| 1 | (Sweden) | Erik Portillo | G | L | 26 | 2023 | Gothenburg, Sweden | Kings |
| 10 | (Finland) | Otto Salin | D | R | 22 | 2025 | Helsinki, Finland | Kings |
| 15 | (United States) | Grant Slukynsky | C | L | 24 | 2026 | Edina, Minnesota | Kings |
| 50 | (United States) | Hampton Slukynsky | G | L | 21 | 2026 | Warroad, Minnesota | Kings |
| 34 | (Canada) | Taylor Ward | F | R | 28 | 2022 | Kelowna, British Columbia | Kings |
| 80 | (Canada) | Jared Woolley | D | L | 20 | 2026 | Port Hope, Ontario | Kings |
| 78 | (United States) | Jared Wright | RW | R | 23 | 2025 | Burnsville, Minnesota | Kings |
| 13 | (Canada) | Koehn Ziemmer | RW | R | 21 | 2025 | Mayerthorpe, Alberta | Kings |

=== Team captains ===
- Vincent LoVerde, 2015–17
- Brett Sutter, 2017–22
- T.J. Tynan, 2022–24
- Joe Hicketts, 2024–present

=== American Hockey League Hall of Famers ===
AHL Hall of Fame Honored Members
| Name | Seasons | Induction Year |
|---|---|---|
| Michael Leighton | 2018-19 (player) | 2025 |
