= Cardiff Devils =

Welsh ice hockey team

- City: Cardiff, Wales
- League: Elite Ice Hockey League
- Founded: 1986
- Home arena: Vindico Arena (capacity: 3,250)
- Colours: Red, white, black
- Owners: Steve King; Brian Parker; Craig Shostak; Kelly Hughes
- General manager: Todd Kelman
- Head coach: Paul Thompson
- Captain: Joey Martin
- Affiliates: Bristol Pitbulls, NIHL National; Cardiff Fire, NIHL 1, Cardiff Canucks NIHL 2.
- Website: www.cardiffdevils.com
Home colours	Away colours	Third colours

Championships
- Regular season titles: 1989–90, 1992–93, 1993–94, 1996–97, 2016–17, 2017–18
- Autumn Cups: 1993–94
- Challenge Cups: 2005–06, 2014–15, 2016–17
- Playoff championships: 1989–90, 1992–93, 1993–94, 1998–99, 2017–18, 2018–19, 2021–22, 2025-26

The Cardiff Devils (Welsh: Diawliaid Caerdydd) are a Welsh professional ice hockey team who play in the UK-based Elite Ice Hockey League (EIHL). The team plays at the Vindico Arena in Cardiff Bay.

Cardiff's most recent trophy was the 2025-26 EIHL Playoff title.

== History ==
The Cardiff Devils were formed during the summer of 1986 when Sports Nationwide built the Wales National Ice Rink in the centre of Cardiff, Wales. John Lawless, a 25-year-old Canadian, was given the responsibility of building a new team. He was, at the time a trainee assistant manager at Peterborough which was owned by the same company.

=== 1986–87 season ===
The club entered the British Ice Hockey League Structure at the bottom of Division 2 (Midland Section) at a time when each team was only allowed a maximum of three foreign players. With Lawless deciding to play himself, he brought over fellow Canadians Perry Olivier and Bill Taylor to join him, with the remaining places going to British players, one of whom was Paul Morganti, a student at Cardiff University who had been raised in Canada and had significant high school hockey experience. With the WNIR not ready for the start of the season, the team played several games away from home to begin with. The Cardiff Devils' first ever game was a Challenge match away to the Oxford City Stars on 12 October 1986. Despite Oxford playing in the division above, the Devils won the game 9–8.

Cardiff finally got to play their first ever game at the WNIR on 30 November 1986 where a crowd of 2500 saw their new heroes humiliate the Ashfield Islanders 32–0.

Devils finished the league season unbeaten with 13 wins and 1 draw from 14 games to finish top of Division 2 (Midlands), 2 points clear of Welsh rivals Deeside Dragons. Promotion to Division 1 was dependent on them winning the Division 1 Play-off Champions, which the club hosted at the WNIR. Their semi-final against Northern winners Grimsby Buffaloes was surrounded by controversy when the game was abandoned after a 34-player bench clearance with Cardiff leading 10–4. The BIHA officials though ruled that it had been provoked by the English side and hence the score should stand as a final result. In the other semi-final Scottish League Champions Aviemore Blackhawks beat Southern Winners Streatham Bruins(13–4) to set up an all Celtic final the following day. Unfortunately for the Devils, despite a final period comeback after being 4 goals behind, Aviemore were able to hang on for a 10–9 win and promotion to Division 1 at the expense of Cardiff. But in a strange twist of fate the result proved to be irrelevant. The BIHA decided the league structure needed re-organising, and as a result the Cardiff Devils were moved into Division 1 (South) for the following season.

=== 1987–88 season ===
Following promotion to Division 1 and a new Sponsorship deal, Lawless was able to strengthen his team. Key signings included goalie Jeff Smith, coach Brian Kanewischer and Canadian defender Shannon Hope as a replacement for Bill Taylor who was injured midway through the previous season. The season proved to be successful with the Devils winning the Autumn Trophy in November with an 11–10 aggregate win over the Trafford Metros.

In the league the side finished a very respectable 3rd place, although 10 points behind winners Telford Tigers. The two teams had created a fierce rivalry during the season due to several controversial and violent games. During a game on 16 January in Telford, the Devils players were subjected to constant sticking offences resulted in Shannon Hope receiving a serious injury just below his eye. With the referee not calling any penalty, coach Kanewischer took his team off the ice in protest midway through the 2nd period. After a league investigation Cardiff were eventually fined £1000 for their actions and Kanewisher banned for the rest of the season.

=== 1988–89 season ===
Lawless and Cardiff shocked the whole of British Ice Hockey by signing three of the top players from the Premier Division over the summer. Canadian import Steve Moria was signed from the Fife Flyers, and then the Cooper brothers Ian and Steve joined from Heineken Champions Durham Wasps. It was the first time top British players were being offered good money to sign for other clubs and it led to claims that Cardiff and their "Cheque Book Hockey" would ruin the game. The signings were crucial as the Devils finished first 1st in Division 1, just a single point ahead of Medway Bears. They also retained the Autumn Trophy they had won the previous season, beating Medway 15–8 on aggregate.

However, to gain promotion though they had to beat the Premier Division's bottom club – the Streatham Redskins. Cardiff destroyed their Premier Division rivals 12–1 in the first leg, and a 9–5 victory in Streatham the following weekend secured an easy aggregate victory and a place in the Heineken Premier Division for the following season.

=== 1989–90 season ===
With the Devils finally reaching the promised land of the Premier Division, John Lawless was able to strengthen his team with the addition of an extra import now that he himself had received his British Passport. Paul Castron was signed but pulled out just before the start of the season, but fortunately for the club Doug McEwen had been released by Peterborough at the same time and so signed for the Devils instead. Victory in the pre-season Trafford Tournament gave an indication of the success to come, although the Devils did get knocked out of the Autumn Cup at the semi-final stage to Durham Wasps. In the league though they were unbeaten until December, by which time they had built up a healthy lead at the top of the table. A 14–7 victory at home to the Peterborough Pirate on 4 March 1990 clinched their first ever Premier Division League title. Unbeaten in the Playoffs Qualifying group, the Devils travelled to Wembley where they beat Fife Flyers 5–1 in the semi-final. In the final they faced the Murrayfield Racers who quickly went 3–0 up. Cardiff fought back though and a Steven Cooper goal 95 seconds from the end tied the game at 6–6 and sent the game into Overtime and then a Penalty Shootout. After Doug McEwen had scored the 23rd shot, Jeff Smith saved Tony Hand's attempt and the Devils had won the Playoff Championship in one of the greatest Finals of all time, live on BBC Grandstand.

=== 1990–91 season ===
After the previous years success, the British players were in great demand. Ian and Stephen Cooper both returned to Durham, whilst Brian Dickson and Robbie Morris also left. In came Derek King (Fife Flyers), Neil Browne (Slough Jets), Paul Heavey and Peter Smith (both Peterborough Pirates). Despite a record breaking Europa Cup tournament which included an 11–8 victory over Rodovre and a 3rd placed group finish, the team struggled for consistency domestically. Knocked out once again at the semi-final stage of the Autumn Cup by Durham Wasps, they finished second to the Wasps in the league and were knocked out in the Playoff Semi-finals by Peterborough Pirates as Durham completed the Grand Slam.

=== 1997–2008 ===
In 1997 the club won the Superleague championship. Hardship followed and the club was declared bankrupt in 2001 but a new team was soon formed which competed in the British National League. The new owners massively reduced spending and effectively disbanded the old Cardiff Devils, with the entire Superleague team departing. The then-owner, Bob Phillips was the subject of much scorn amongst fans due to the perceived mismanagement and effective destruction of what was then one of Britain's most established and stable teams.

The new team was formed from a handful of quickly drafted players, as well scavenging the Cardiff Devils youth teams to make up the numbers under the lower budget. Attendances at games dropped heavily, going from full arenas to typically less than fifty. During the first two seasons under Phillips, large protests and demonstrations were commonplace outside games, with initially hundreds of supporters club members appearing outside the arena. While eventually the supporters club would reconcile with Bob Phillips and some of the old players would make goodwill appearances, the team's best years were clearly behind them.

In 2003, the Devils became founder members of the Elite League, finishing the first season in 5th place. They were semi-finalists in the end of season playoffs, losing to champions Sheffield Steelers.

During the 2004–05 NHL lock-out, Rob Davison of the San Jose Sharks played for the Devils.

The 2004–5 season did not finish well for the Devils. As in the 03–04 season, they reached the playoff semi-finals, but were once again defeated, this time by the Nottingham Panthers.

During 2005, serious questions over the future of the Devils began to emerge. The Wales National Ice Rink was due for demolition in 2006 to make way for a John Lewis store and plans for a new ice arena at Sophia Gardens were progressing at an extremely slow pace. There was a very real threat that 2005–06 could have been the last season of the Cardiff Devils.

The Save Our Rink Action Committee (SORAC) formed to lead calls from the city's ice hockey clubs and fans for a temporary facility to be constructed while a more permanent building was finally built. SORAC successfully campaigned for a temporary rink in the Cardiff Bay area of the city. Planning permission was given in January 2006 and the structure was expected to be completed in time for the 2006–07 ice hockey season.

However this proved not to be the case, with construction problems delaying the opening of the Cardiff Arena until December 2006.

The Devils won their first silverware of the EIHL era in 2006. The Devils faced arch rivals Coventry Blaze in a repeat of the previous year's Challenge Cup final but were beaten 3–0 in the first leg of the final in Coventry. The Devils however managed an incredible turn around in the second leg, defeating the Blaze 4–1 to tie the game on aggregate and won the cup 1–0 in the following penalty shoot-out. "Man of the Match" Nathan Rempel scored a memorable hat-trick, whilst Rejean Stringer scored the winning goal in the penalty shoot-out.

In January 2007 player-coach Ed Patterson was released by the Devils in a cost-cutting move. Patterson was replaced as player / coach by Gerad Adams, with Brad Voth taking over from Adams as captain.

After several games during which injured players carried out the duties of bench coach, former Devils player Brent Pope was appointed to the position. Despite off-ice difficulties throughout the 2006–07 season, the Devils finished 3rd in the league. The Devils also won the British Knockout Cup, beating rivals Coventry Blaze 3–0 at Coventry's Skydome. A cup double was snatched from the Cardiff Devils' grasp when they lost 1–0 on penalties to the Nottingham Panthers in the 2006–07 Playoff Final, after the game finished 1–1 after overtime.

The 2007–08 season saw the Devils finish the league in 6th place. After a string of losses at the beginning of the season, they rose to an unbeaten run of games which propelled them to the top of the Elite League. However this was soon ended as a huge injury crisis hit the club leading to many of the first team having to watch from the sidelines. The Devils managed to qualify for the playoff weekend by beating the Nottingham Panthers at the Trent FM Arena, and holding them to a 3–3 draw the following evening. The Devils were defeated at the playoff weekend by the eventual winners, the Sheffield Steelers, going down 2–1. The loss capped a disappointing season.

=== 2008–09 season ===
The Devils season was mixed. The team struggled again with injuries and suspensions – notably the highly controversial 11-game suspension of club captain Brad Voth (which was cut to 7 on review). Two summer signings, defence man Likit Andersson and forward Rod Hinks, were cut from the squad due to injury and performance respectively. Returning defence man Tyson Teplitsky filled the gap left by Andersson and contributed greatly in points. Canadian Marc Fulton was drafted in to replace Hinks, however after a promising start, was sidelined by injury and did not play for the club again. Joining Fulton on the injury list were centre Lee Cowmeadow and then top scorer Mike Prpich.

On 26 January 2009, the Devils announced the signing of Matt Elich, a former NHL player with the Tampa Bay Lightning. Elich, brought in to replace the injured Derek Campbell, scored 1+1 in his debut game and continued to contribute points consistently.

The Devils, although eliminated from the Challenge Cup got through to the British Knockout Cup final, a trophy won during the 06–07 season, after demolishing a dwindling Basingstoke Bison squad 17–1 over two legs [8–0, 9–1]. They faced and eventually lost out to the Belfast Giants

Devils captain Brad Voth was given the honour of being named captain for the South team for the 'All-Star Spectacular'.

The Devils scraped through to the playoff semi-finals in Nottingham after beating the Belfast Giants with an overtime goal in the Cardiff Arena from Captain Brad Voth, ending the series 6–5.

The Devils then lost to the Sheffield Steelers 5–2 in the Playoff semi-finals. Sheffield went on to win the playoffs, defeating the Nottingham Panthers by 2–0 in the final, completing their league and playoff double.

=== 2009–10 season ===
The Devils started their season fairly well with big imports such as Mark Smith and Max Birbraer returning and newly signed forward Tylor Michel becoming a fan favourite quickly.

The Devils buried their Challenge Cup voodoo from the new arena and progressed to the semi-finals of the Challenge Cup for the first time in 3 years by beating the Coventry Blaze 3–2 on 28 October 2009

On 7 December 2009 it was announced that forward Ryan Finnerty, formerly of the rival Sheffield Steelers had signed for Cardiff. Shortly afterward, import defenceman Scott Romfo was released, with coach Gerad Adams citing salary costs as the main reason. This move left many fans feeling disappointed, due to Scott's impressive performance over the preceding weeks. Romfo surprisingly returned to the club on 12 January 2010, following the announcement that he was being resigned to the team to provide injury cover.

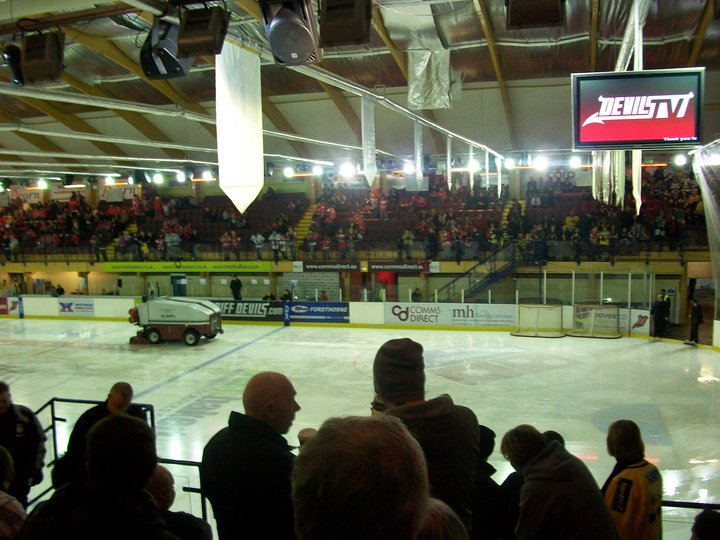
Cardiff Arena prior to the 2010 Challenge Cup Final first leg.

On 16 February 2010, leader Brad Voth was relieved of the captaincy, after over 3 years, by head coach Gerad Adams. The reason being that Coach Adams felt Voth was being unfairly targeted by officials because of the image he had built up over the years as a hard-hitting enforcer, and that by releasing him of his duties, he could re-focus on his game. Also, if Voth had been ejected from one more game as captain, he would face a lengthy ban. Therefore, by relinquishing the armband he could carry on playing the enforcer role. British Defenceman Mark Richardson was named new team captain in his place.

On 9 March 2010, the Devils lost 8–7 on aggregate in the final of the Challenge Cup to the Nottingham Panthers. The Devils in fact won the game 5–4 on the night but it was not enough to overturn the 4–2 loss suffered in the 1st leg in Cardiff the previous week.

The Devils defeated the reigning Playoff champions the Sheffield Steelers in the quarter-final match up over two nights. The first leg in Cardiff saw the Devils win 4–2. The following night in Sheffield saw the Devils win again 5–3, ending the series with an aggregate score of 9–5. On 3 April, the Devils defeated the newly crowned league champions Coventry Blaze in the playoff semi-final in Nottingham by 6 goals to 3 to advance to the final. Meanwhile, on the same day, the Belfast Giants defeated the Nottingham Panthers after a penalty shootout to also advance. The final was played in Nottingham on 4 April. Belfast and Cardiff were tied 2–2 after regulation time. A scoreless OT period meant the final would go to a penalty shootout. Evan Cheverie for the Belfast Giants shot past Stevie Lyle in the second round of penalties and won the playoff title for Belfast.

=== 2010–11 season ===
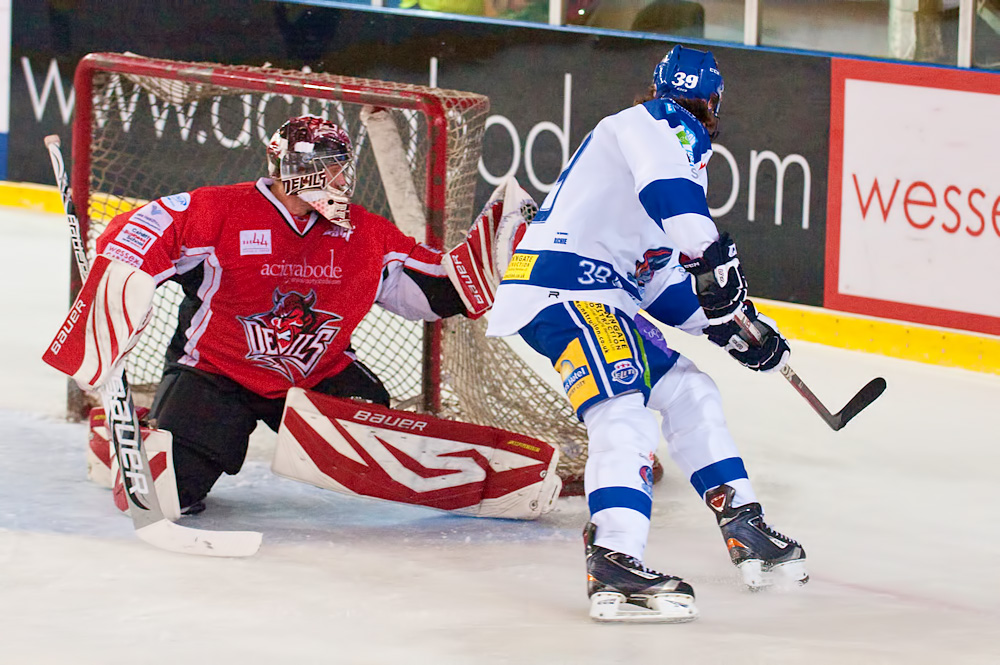
Cardiff Devils-Coventry Blaze

The Devils embarked on the season with an average start, with critics citing an underperforming defence. With enforcer Justin Sawyer leaving the club for personal reasons in October 2010, and with iconic power forward Brad Voth out with a hand injury, things were looking bleak. On 1 November, the club announced the signing of Sawyer's replacement, ex-NHL defenceman Craig Weller. With Weller on board and Voth back in the line-up, the club embarked on a record breaking winning streak, which ended after a penalty shootout loss in Dundee on 16 January. The club did not lose a game between 28 October 2010 and 16 January 2011. On 9 January, the Devils went to the top of the Elite Ice Hockey League table with a 7–1 home win over Dundee Stars. The victory also saw first line winger Jon Pelle beat the league record for goals in a season (35), previously held by former Devils player Mike Prpich. As of 15 January 2011, the club now hold the UK record for games unbeaten in all competitions (22) and most consecutive league games unbeaten (21). The Devils management have had discussions with the IIHF and Guinness World Records who have verified that this is in fact a World Record.

=== 2014–2020, the Lord era ===
Following the takeover of the club in the summer of 2014 and the arrival of Todd Kelman as General Manager, forward Andrew Lord was named player-coach of the Devils a year after he first joined the club. Lord led the club to the 2015 Challenge Cup title in his first season as a coach.

Further success followed with the club's first league title in 20 years secured at the end of the 2016-17 EIHL season, alongside another Challenge Cup title - while the team finished runners-up in the Elite League play-offs after losing the final to the Sheffield Steelers in 2017.

In the 2017–18 EIHL season, Cardiff won both the league and play-offs double - before Lord dropped the player-coach title in 2018 and adopted the sole title as head coach.

The following season, 2018–19, the Devils missed out on the league title to Belfast Giants after a final day defeat to Coventry Blaze but made amends by winning the 2019 play-off title.

What proved to be Lord's final season as coach was brought prematurely to a halt when the 2019–20 EIHL season was curtailed in March 2020 due to the COVID-19 pandemic.

Cardiff were top of the table at the time of the cancellation and were runners-up in the 2020 Challenge Cup final, losing to Sheffield Steelers, although the scheduled play-offs were cancelled.

Lord departed the Devils in June 2020 to take up the head coach role at ECHL side Greenville Swamp Rabbits. In all, Lord won nine total titles, including two Elite League titles, two play-off championships and two Challenge Cups during his time in Cardiff, leaving as the Devils' most successful ever coach.

=== 2020–2023 ===
Cardiff initially delayed the announcement of Lord's successor as head coach and, on 15 September 2020, the Elite League confirmed the suspension of the 2020–21 season due to ongoing uncertainty over coronavirus and its restrictions. The EIHL board unanimously determined that social distancing guidelines and having no fans in attendance at games made the season non-viable. The season was later cancelled completely in February 2021.

Cardiff also withdrew from the 2020–21 Champions Hockey League. Incidentally, the entire 2020-21 Champions Hockey League campaign was later cancelled.

On 22 September 2020, the Cardiff Devils announced the appointment of Jarrod Skalde as the club's new head coach and Director of Hockey Operations. Skalde arrived after spending the last two seasons as assistant coach with AHL side Wilkes-Barre/Scranton Penguins.

Despite leading Cardiff to the 2022 Challenge Cup final where they were runners-up, Skalde parted company with the Devils in April 2022. Forward Brodie Dupont and assistant coach Neil Francis were named interim coaches for the remainder of the season. Dupont and Francis then led Cardiff to the 2022 EIHL play-off title, with a 6–3 victory over Belfast in the final.

In May 2022, Cardiff announced the appointment of Dupont as head coach on a permanent basis.

In the same month (May 2022), Cardiff announced an affiliation with NIHL side Bristol Pitbulls - the side coached by former Devils assistant Jamie Elson - which will see up to three Pitbulls players sign two-way deals with the Devils to train and play.

After an off-season with signings that brought back the past players of Joey Martin, Ben Bowns and Samuel Jardine and promising players such as four time ECHL MVP Marcus Crawford, the Devils were expecting a strong year. The first half of the season was underwhelming, and included a notable defeat on 6 November with a crushing 9–3 loss to the Belfast Giants.

Despite the Devils losing their first four games in the Challenge Cup, the Devils managed to win the final four Challenge Cup group games which saw them qualify for the quarter-finals against their long time rival the Sheffield Steelers.

As the Devils won the 2022 play-off title, they qualified for the 2022–23 IIHF Continental Cup. The Devils were placed in Group E which is one of two third round stages and hosted the group against Ducs d'Angers, HDD Jesenice and HK Zemgale. The Devils won all three games in that group qualifying them for the final round of the Continental Cup in January against HK Nitra, Ducs d'Angers and Asiago Hockey. The Devils finished 3rd in the Continental Cup final after losing to the champions HK Nitra 3–2 on the final day of the competition.

The Devils finished the league season in 4th place on 75 points with a 35-14-5 record, nine points behind eventual champions Belfast Giants. They would then lose the play-off final to Belfast, who completed the treble with a 4–1 victory in Nottingham.

On 19 April 2023, Cardiff announced that head coach Brodie Dupont and assistant coach Christian Horn would leave the club after one season, following a mutual parting of ways.

=== 2023–2025, the Russell era ===
On 12 May 2023, The Devils announced the appointment of Team GB and Ravensburg Towerstars head coach, Pete Russell as the new head coach of the Cardiff Devils. Along with the announcement of Russell, it was also announced that Team GB goaltending coach Euan King would be officially appointed as the goaltending/video-coach for the Devils.

On 16 May 2023, The Guildford Flames issued a press release stating that they would not be competing in the 2023–24 IIHF Continental Cup competition. This would mean under the EIHL rulebook on European qualification that the spot would go to the Sheffield Steelers as they finished 3rd in the Elite League season. However a day later on the 17th May, the Steelers declined their Continental Cup spot. This meant the spot would go to the Devils.

On 3 August 2023, the Cardiff Devils rebranded their primary logo and also introduced a secondary wordmark, and tertiary logo featuring a Devil's pitchfork.

Between 12 and 14 January 2024, the Cardiff Devils hosted the IIHF Continental Cup Final at their home venue, the recently rebranded Vindico Arena. The Devils finished with back to back bronze medals in the competition with Nomad Astana from the Kazakhstan Hockey Championship winning all 3 games that weekend

Cardiff finished the 2023/24 EIHL season with a 37-14-3 record as runners-up to the Sheffield Steelers and went on to face the Dundee Stars in the playoff quarter-finals. Cardiff defeated the Stars to advance to the Playoff Final Weekend, but they lost the semi-final to the Belfast Giants in overtime by a 2–1 score. Cardiff claimed bronze in the 3rd place game against the Guildford Flames with a 7–5 win.

The 2024 offseason saw Cardiff bring back some notable former names, including defenceman Gleason Fournier from Fehérvár AV19 and netminder Mac Carruth from Herning Blue Fox.

On 3 November 2024, the Devils announced that head coach Pete Russell had signed a 3-year contract extension that would see him as head coach of the team till at least the end of the 2027/28 season.

Between 16 and 19 January 2025, the Cardiff Devils hosted the IIHF Continental Cup Final at their home venue, the Vindico Arena. Due to visa issues, Arlan Koksheteau were forced to withdraw from the tournament leaving it as just a three team tournament including GKS Katowice and Brûleurs de Loups. The Devils won both of their games winning them their first Continental Cup title and their first trophy in the Pete Russell era.

On 22 April 2025, just two days after the Devils lost the playoff final, Cardiff announced the departure of Russell.

=== 2025–present, the Thompson era ===
On 1 May 2025, Cardiff announced the appointment of former Team GB, Coventry Blaze and Sheffield Steelers head coach, Paul Thompson as the new head coach of the Cardiff Devils.

On 14 September 2025, Paul Thompson named forward Joey Martin as Captain of the team despite defenseman Mark Richardson having held the title since the Devils returned from the COVID-19 pandemic in 2021.

On 13 November 2025, Cardiff announced the signing of former Guildford Flames Captain, Brett Ferguson, for the remainder of the season.

Cardiff finished the 2025/26 EIHL season with a 35-14-5 record as runners-up to the Belfast Giants and went on to face the Coventry Blaze in the playoff quarter-finals. Cardiff defeated the Blaze 6-2 on aggregate to advance to the Playoff Final Weekend. They went into the weekend as the highest seeded team following a historic upset as the 8th seed Glasgow Clan defeated the Belfast Giants, Cardiff won the semifinal match 3-1 against the Clan and went on to win their fourth EIHL playoff title with a 5-2 win over the Sheffield Steelers, led by Nolan Yaremko who scored two goals in one and a half minutes at the end of the second period. Empty net goals from Josh MacDonald and Kohen Olischefski secured the first piece of domestic silverware for the Devils since their 2022 playoff title.

On 22 April 2026, Cardiff announced the re-signing of head coach Paul Thompson and assistant coach Niklas Hovivuori for the 2026/27 season.

The 2026 offseason saw the Devils bring in the son of former Devil, Vezio Sacratini, Jake Sacratini making him the first son of a former Cardiff Devil to join the club. The Devils also signed 2025/26 second team All-Star Nicholas Welsh from the Manchester Storm.

== Season-by-season record ==
This is a list of each EIHL season record by the Devils.

Note: GP = Games played, W = Wins, L = Losses, T = Ties, OTL = Overtime/shootout losses, Pts = Points, GF = Goals for, GA = Goals against

Season	GP	W	L	T	OTL	Pts	GF	GA	League	Playoffs	Challenge Cup
2003–04	56	23	24	6	3	55	155	162	5th	Lost in Semifinal 2-0 (Steelers)	Lost in Semifinal 1-3 (Steelers)
2004–05	50	30	15	4	1	65	152	121	3rd	Lost in Semifinal 3-1 (Panthers)	Lost in Final 6-1, 5-4 (11-5) (Blaze)
2005–06	42	18	17	6	1	43	110	112	5th	Lost in Semifinal 2-1 SO (Steelers)	Champions
2006–07	54	32	17	0	5	69	175	152	3rd	Lost in Final 2-1 (Panthers)	Lost in Group Stage
2007–08	54	26	25	0	3	55	164	174	6th	Lost in Semifinal 2-1 (Steelers)	Lost in Semifinal 4-4, 2-0 (6-4) (Steelers)
2008–09	54	28	19	0	7	63	174	143	5th	Lost in Semifinal 5-2 (Steelers)	Lost in Group Stage
2009–10	56	31	22	0	3	65	193	158	4th	Lost in Final 3-2 SO (Giants)	Lost in Final 4-2, 4-5 (8-7) (Panthers)
2010–11	54	42	9	0	3	87	269	141	2nd	Lost in Final 5-4 (Panthers)	Lost in Semifinal 4-0, 1-2 (5-2) (Giants)
2011–12	54	32	12	0	10	74	191	158	4th	Lost in Final 2-0 (Panthers)	Lost in Semifinal 2-1, 3-5 (5-6) (Giants)
2012–13	52	21	23	0	8	50	160	180	5th	Lost in Semifinal 6-3 (Panthers)	Lost in Group Stage
2013–14	52	24	24	0	4	52	162	182	9th	Did Not Qualify	Lost in Semifinal 7-1, 3-3 (10-4) (Giants)
2014–15	52	34	14	0	4	72	210	151	3rd	Lost in Quarterfinal 8-3 (Giants)	Champions
2015–16	52	33	15	0	4	70	179	139	2nd	Bronze Winners	Lost in Final 0-1 OT (Panthers)
2016–17	52	39	10	0	3	81	200	136	Champions	Lost in Final 6-5 OT (Steelers)	Champions
2017–18	56	41	13	0	2	84	234	149	Champions	Champions	Lost in Final 6-3 (Giants)
2018–19	60	43	11	0	6	92	235	146	2nd	Champions	Lost in Quarterfinal 3-4, 6-4 OT (9-8) (Clan)
2019–20	46	31	13	0	2	64	162	138	Season curtailed	Season curtailed	Lost in Final 4-3 (Steelers)
2021–22	54	35	15	0	4	74	188	131	3rd	Champions	Lost in Final 3-2 OT (Giants)
2022–23	54	35	14	0	5	75	192	142	4th	Lost in Final 4-1 (Giants)	Lost in Quarterfinal 5-1, 5-3 (10-4) (Steelers)
2023–24	54	37	14	0	3	77	210	151	2nd	Bronze Winners	Lost in Quarterfinal 3-4, 3-1 (6-5) (Clan)
2024–25	54	32	18	0	4	68	178	143	4th	Lost in Final 4-3 OT (Panthers)	Lost in Final 4-0 (Giants)
2025–26	54	35	14	0	5	75	195	122	2nd	Champions	Lost in Group Stage

== Current squad ==
Squad for 2026–27 Elite League season

- * Denotes two-way deal with Bristol Pitbulls
- ** Denotes two-way deal with Swindon Wildcats

Netminders
No.		Player	Catches	Acquired	Place of Birth	Joined from	Press Release
30	(United States) (Algeria)	Christian Stoever	L	2025	Northville, US	Bowling Green Falcons, NCAA Division I
33	(England)	Ben Bowns	L	2022	Rotherham, England	HK Dukla Trenčín, Slovak Extraliga
34	(Wales)	Harry Thomas**	L	2025	Cardiff, Wales	Swindon Wildcats, NIHL

Defencemen
No.		Player	Shoots	Acquired	Place of Birth	Joined from	Press Release
4	(Sweden)	Jonas Emmerdahl	L	2026	Stockholm, Sweden	Fife Flyers, EIHL
6	(United States)	Brandon Estes	R	2025	Richardson, US	Odense Bulldogs, Metal Ligaen
17	(England) (United Kingdom)	Mark Richardson A	R	2021	Swindon, England	EC Bad Nauheim, DEL2
20	(Canada)	Gleason Fournier	L	2024	Rimouski, Canada	Fehérvár AV19, IceHL
22	(Canada)	Nicholas Welsh	R	2026	Halifax, Canada	Manchester Storm, EIHL
23	(United States) (United Kingdom)	Evan Mosey	R	2023	Downers Grove, US	Sheffield Steelers, EIHL
44	(Canada)	Tyson Helgesen	L	2025	Fairview, Canada	Ferencvárosi TC, Erste Liga
45	(England)	Jacob Bryceland*	L	2026	Telford, England	Bristol Pitbulls, NIHL
52	(Canada)	Jimmy Oligny A	L	2025	Saint-Michel, Canada	Graz 99ers, IceHL

Forwards
No.		Player	Position	Acquired	Place of Birth	Joined from	Press Release
5	(Wales) (United Kingdom)	Ben Davies	C/RW	2021	Cardiff, Wales	Manchester Storm, EIHL
11	(Canada)	Thomas Caron	LW/RW	2026	Candiac, Canada	HPK, Liiga
16	(England) (United Kingdom)	Sam Duggan	C/RW	2021	Reading, England	Coventry Blaze, EIHL
21	(Canada)	Kohen Olischefski A	RW	2024	Abbotsford, Canada	Düsseldorfer EG, DEL
25	(Canada)	Riley Brandt	F	2022	Trail, Canada	MacEwan University Griffins, U Sports
27	(Canada)	Kristoff Kontos	C	2025	Penetanguishene, Canada	Nottingham Panthers, EIHL
28	(Wales) (Canada)	Jake Sacratini	RW	2026	Cardiff, Wales	SUNY-Plattsburgh, NCAA III
57	(Canada)	Nolan Yaremko	LW/C	2025	Spirit River, Canada	ESV Kaufbeuren, DEL2
63	(Finland)	Panu Mieho	C/W	2026	Helsinki, Finland	HIFK, Liiga
72	(Finland)	Linus Nyman	LW/RW	2026	Helsinki, Finland	HC Ässät Pori, Liiga
77	(Wales) (United Kingdom)	Bayley Harewood	C/RW	2021	Barry, Wales	Bristol Pitbulls, NIHL
79	(Canada)	Ryan Barrow	RW	2023	Banff, Canada	Manchester Storm, EIHL
88	(Canada)	Joey Martin C	C	2022	Thorold, Canada	Graz99ers, IceHL
92	(Canada)	Josh MacDonald	LW/RW	2024	London, Canada	Krefeld Pinguine, DEL2

Team Staff
No.		Name	Position	Place of Birth	Joined from	Press Release
N/A	(England)	Paul Thompson	Head Coach	Singapore, Malaysia	Odense Bulldogs, Metal Ligaen
N/A	(Finland)	Niklas Hovivuori	Assistant Coach	Tampere, Finland	Odense Bulldogs, Metal Ligaen
N/A	(Canada)	Jeff Battah	Goaltending/Video Coach	Oshawa, Canada	Rapaces de Gap, Ligue Magnus
N/A	(Wales)	Neil Francis	Director of Hockey Operations	Cardiff, Wales	Joined coaching staff in 2009; assumed current title in 2022
N/A	(Canada) (Republic of Ireland)	Todd Kelman	General Manager	Calgary, Canada	Belfast Giants, EIHL
N/A	(Wales)	Daniel Brabon	Goaltending coach	Caerphilly, Wales	Appointed in 2013
N/A	(Wales)	Dan Forbes	Conditioning coach	Swansea, Wales	Appointed in 2016
N/A	(England)	Thomas Murdy	Equipment Manager	Whitley Bay, England	Appointed in 2020

Recent departures
No.		Player	Position	Acquired	Leaving For	Press Release
11	(Canada) (United Kingdom)	Brett Perlini	C/RW	2024	Coventry Blaze, EIHL
22	(United States)	Connor Caponi	F	2025	Atlanta Gladiators, ECHL
42	(Canada)	Steven MacLean	D	2025	Adirondack Thunder, ECHL
49	(Canada)	Cedric Lacroix	C/LW/D	2025	Adirondack Thunder, ECHL
96	(Canada)	Cole Sanford	RW/C	2024	Guildford Flames, EIHL

== Former Devils ==
=== Retired jersey numbers ===
- 7 Doug McEwen
- 9 John Lawless
- 10 Jason Stone
- 14 Brian Dickson
- 19 Steve Moria
- 26 Brad Voth
- 29 Neil Francis
- 35 Shannon Hope

=== Captains ===
Name	Tenure
Perry Olivier	1987–88
Steve Moria	1988–91
Paul Heavey	1992–94
Stephen Cooper	1995–96
Mike Ware	1996–97, 2002–04
Ivan Matulik	1997–2001
Mike Nicholishen	2001–02
Ed Patterson	2004–05
Gerad Adams	2005–06
Brad Voth	2006–10
Ryan Finnerty	2010–11
Scott Matzka	2011–12
Stuart MacRae	2012–13
Mac Faulkner	2013–14
Tyson Marsh	2014–16
Jake Morissette	2016–19
Joey Martin	2019–20, 2025–Present
Mark Richardson	2021–25

=== Head coaches ===
Name	Tenure
Brian Kanewischer	1987–90
Paul Farmer	1990–91
John Griffith	1991–92
John Lawless	1994–95
Paul Heavey	1995–00
Troy Walkington	2000–01
Ken Southwick	2001–02
Glenn Mulvenna	2002–03
David Whistle	2003–05, 2013–14
Gerad Adams	2013–14
Andrew Lord	2014–20
Jarrod Skalde	2021–22
Brodie Dupont	2022–23
Pete Russell	2023–25
Paul Thompson	2025–

== Honours and awards ==
League Championships

- 1989–90, 1992–93, 1993–94, 1996–97, 2016–17, 2017–18

Play-off Championships

- 1989–90, 1992–93, 1993–94, 1998–99, 2017–18, 2018–19, 2021–22, 2025-26

BHL Division One League Championships

- 1988/89

Autumn Cup

- 1993–94

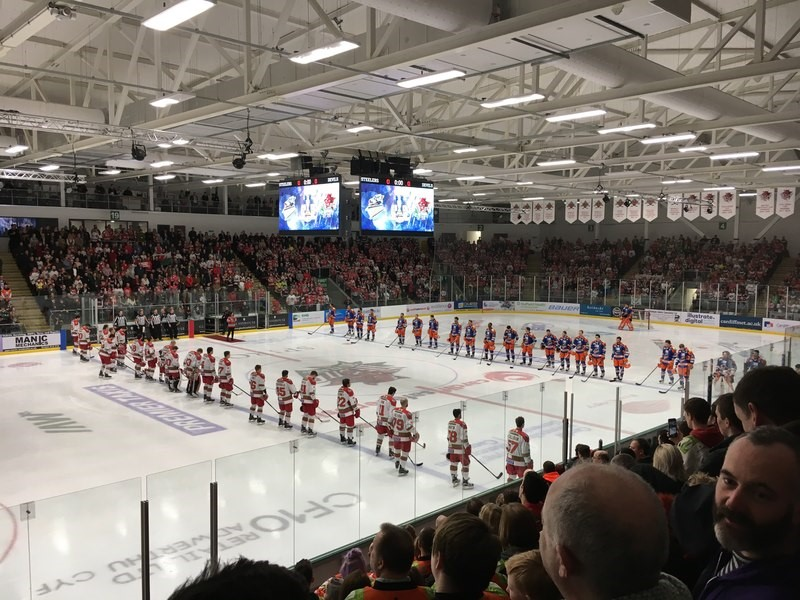
Challenge Cup Final at The Viola Arena. The players of the Cardiff Devils and the Sheffield Steelers line up for the national anthems at the start of the 2016–17 Challenge Cup Final. The Devils won 3–2

Challenge Cups

- 2005–06, 2014–15, 2016–17

IIHF Continental Cup

- 2024–25

British Knockout Cup

- 2006–07

First Team All-Stars

- 1996–97: Stevie Lyle, Kip Noble, Ivan Matulik, Vezio Sacratini
- 1998–99: Kip Noble
- 2004–05: Vezio Sacratini
- 2006–07: Mark Smith
- 2009–10: Wes Jarvis
- 2012–13: Mac Faulkner
- 2014–15: Andrew Hotham, Joey Martin
- 2015–16: Ben Bowns, Andrew Hotham, Joey Martin
- 2016–17: Ben Bowns, Andrew Hotham, Joey Martin
- 2017–18: Ben Bowns, Andrew Hotham, Joey Martin
- 2018–19: Gleason Fournier, Joey Martin
- 2019–20: Gleason Fournier, Joey Haddad
- 2022–23: Marcus Crawford
- 2023–24: Marcus Crawford, Cole Sanford
- 2024–25: Josh MacDonald
- 2025–26: Brandon Estes

Second Team All-Stars

- 1997–98: Kip Noble, Steve Thornton
- 1998–99: Ivan Matulik
- 1999–2000: Steve Thornton
- 2000–01: Steve Thornton
- 2003–04: Jeff Burgoyne
- 2004–05: Jon Cullen
- 2006–07: Tyson Teplitsky
- 2013–14: Mac Faulkner, Tyson Marsh
- 2014–15: Tyson Marsh, Brent Walton
- 2018–19: Ben Bowns, Charles Linglet
- 2021–22: Mac Carruth, Matthew Register, Brodie Reid
- 2022–23: Trevor Cox, Cole Sanford
- 2025–26: Josh MacDonald, Jimmy Oligny

Preceded by Durham Wasps	Premier League Champions; 1989–90	Succeeded by Durham Wasps
Preceded by Sheffield Steelers	Playoff Champions; 2017–18	Succeeded by TBC
Preceded by Nottingham Panthers	Autumn Cup Winners; 1992–93	Succeeded by Murrayfield Racers
Preceded by Durham Wasps	Premier League Champions; 1992–93, 1993–94	Succeeded by Sheffield Steelers
Preceded by Durham Wasps	Playoff Champions; 1992–93, 1993–94	Succeeded by Sheffield Steelers
Preceded by Inaugural Champions	Superleague Champions; 1996–97	Succeeded by Ayr Scottish Eagles
Preceded by Ayr Scottish Eagles	Playoff Champions; 1998–99	Succeeded by London Knights
Preceded by Nottingham Panthers	Challenge Cup Winners; 2014–15	Succeeded by Nottingham Panthers
Preceded by Sheffield Steelers	Knockout Cup Winners; 2006–07	Succeeded by Coventry Blaze
