= 2008–09 EIHL season =

- League: Elite Ice Hockey League
- Sport: Ice hockey
- Duration: September - March

Regular season
- Champions: Sheffield Steelers

Playoffs
- Champions: Sheffield Steelers

Challenge Cup
- Champions: Belfast Giants

EIHL seasons
- ← 2007-08 2009-10 →

The 2008–09 EIHL season was the sixth season of the Elite Ice Hockey League. It began in September 2008, and ran through to April 2009. The ten clubs in the League competed for 4 different competitions: the Elite League, the Play-Offs, the Challenge Cup, and the Knockout Cup. The winners of the regular season will compete in the 2009–2010 Champions Hockey League. For this season, the Coventry Blaze represented Great Britain in the Continental Cup.

== Charity Shield ==
The season began on September 3, 2008, with a "Charity Shield" game between the 2007–08 league champions and Knockout Cup winning Coventry Blaze and the playoff champions Sheffield Steelers at the SkyDome. The Blaze narrowly beat the Steelers 5–4 in sudden death overtime.

September 3
Coventry | 5 – 4 | Sheffield | Skydome (19.30)
First period | Ref: Tom Darnell
1-0 Lewis (LeClare, Kelman) 01.08 | Att: 3,500+
2-0 Calder (Kelman, Carlson) PP 08.10
Second period
3-0Calder (Kelman, Carlson) PP 22.00
3-1 Philips (League) PP 29.20
3-2 Gillies (Sarich, Hewitt) 30.18
Third period
3-3 Philips (Finerty, Dowd) PP 44.38
4-3 Carlson (Deschatelets) SH 52.35
4-4 Basiuk (Tait, Talbot) PP 53.28
Overtime
5-4 Calder (Carlson, Weaver) PP 60.26

== Challenge Cup ==
For the preliminary round, teams were divided into two groups of five with teams playing each of their opponents once with two homes games and two away games. The home and away games for each club were determined by a random draw. The top two in each group advanced to the semi-finals of the competition.

=== Group stage ===
==== Group A ====
| | Team | GP | W | OTW | L | OTL | GF | GA | Pts |
|---|---|---|---|---|---|---|---|---|---|
| 1 | Belfast Giants | 4 | 4 | 0 | 0 | 0 | 18 | 8 | 8 |
| 2 | Manchester Phoenix | 4 | 3 | 0 | 1 | 0 | 19 | 12 | 6 |
| 3 | Newcastle Vipers | 4 | 2 | 0 | 2 | 0 | 15 | 18 | 4 |
| 4 | Sheffield Steelers | 4 | 1 | 0 | 3 | 0 | 14 | 17 | 2 |
| 5 | Edinburgh Capitals | 4 | 0 | 0 | 4 | 0 | 10 | 21 | 0 |

==== Group B ====
| | Team | GP | W | OTW | L | OTL | GF | GA | Pts |
|---|---|---|---|---|---|---|---|---|---|
| 1 | Basingstoke Bison | 4 | 3 | 0 | 1 | 0 | 19 | 16 | 6 |
| 2 | Coventry Blaze | 4 | 2 | 0 | 1 | 1 | 17 | 13 | 5 |
| 3 | Nottingham Panthers | 4 | 1 | 1 | 0 | 2 | 12 | 11 | 4 |
| 4 | Cardiff Devils | 4 | 2 | 0 | 2 | 0 | 10 | 12 | 4 |
| 5 | Hull Stingrays | 4 | 0 | 0 | 3 | 1 | 11 | 18 | 1 |

==== Semi-finals ====
Coventry Blaze 1 - 1 Belfast Giants (1st Leg)

Belfast Giants 4 - 1 Coventry Blaze (2nd Leg)

Belfast Win 5 - 2 on Aggregate

Basingstoke Bison 2 - 5 Manchester Phoenix (1st Leg)

Manchester Phoenix 6 - 1 Basingstoke Bison (2nd Leg)

Manchester Win 11 - 3 on Aggregate

==== Final ====
Manchester Phoenix 4 - 3 Belfast Giants

Belfast Giants 3 - 1 Manchester Phoenix

Belfast Giants win 6 - 5 on aggregate

== Elite League Table ==
| Regular season standings | GP | W | OTW | L | OTL | GF | GA | GD | Pts |
|---|---|---|---|---|---|---|---|---|---|
| Sheffield Steelers | 54 | 35 | 6 | 6 | 7 | 201 | 115 | +86 | 89 |
| Coventry Blaze | 54 | 34 | 4 | 14 | 2 | 228 | 151 | +77 | 78 |
| Nottingham Panthers | 54 | 33 | 4 | 13 | 4 | 226 | 154 | +72 | 78 |
| Belfast Giants | 54 | 29 | 6 | 15 | 4 | 216 | 170 | +46 | 74 |
| Cardiff Devils | 54 | 21 | 7 | 19 | 7 | 174 | 143 | +31 | 63 |
| Manchester Phoenix | 54 | 22 | 5 | 23 | 4 | 198 | 179 | +19 | 58 |
| Newcastle Vipers | 54 | 14 | 7 | 29 | 4 | 147 | 184 | −37 | 46 |
| Edinburgh Capitals | 54 | 18 | 1 | 29 | 6 | 179 | 243 | −64 | 44 |
| Hull Stingrays | 54 | 13 | 3 | 33 | 5 | 154 | 243 | −89 | 37 |
| Basingstoke Bison | 54 | 5 | 3 | 43 | 3 | 131 | 272 | −141 | 19 |

== Elite League Playoffs ==
Quarter-finals
1 | Sheffield Steelers | 12
8 | Edinburgh Capitals | 7
4 | Belfast Giants | 5
5 | Cardiff Devils | 6
2 | Coventry Blaze | 6
7 | Newcastle Vipers | 4
3 | Nottingham Panthers | 9
6 | Manchester Phoenix | 5

Semi-finals
1 | Sheffield Steelers | 5
5 | Cardiff Devils | 2
2 | Coventry Blaze | 2
3 | Nottingham Panthers | 6

Final
1 | Sheffield Steelers | 2
3 | Nottingham Panthers | 0

== All-star game ==
On February 19th, 2009, the SkyDome in Coventry staged the 2009 EIHL All-Star Game. This game was played out between the North All-Stars and the South All-Stars. Dave Matsos of the Sheffield Steelers was chosen to coach the North, while Paul Thompson of the Coventry Blaze was chosen to coach the South. The rosters for each team consisted of players representing all 10 Elite League clubs.
