= Trevor Cox (ice hockey) =

Canadian ice hockey player

- Born: August 12, 1995 (age 29); Surrey, British Columbia, Canada
- Height: 5 ft 8 in (173 cm)
- Weight: 165 lb (75 kg; 11 st 11 lb)
- Position: Forward
- Shoots: Left
- EIHL team (P) Cur. team Former teams: Cardiff Devils; Cardiff Devils (): Surrey Eagles; Medicine Hat Tigers; Vancouver Giants; Quad City Mallards; Alberta Golden Bears; HC 07 Detva
- Playing career: 2010–present

Trevor Cox (born August 12, 1995) is a Canadian ice hockey player. He is currently playing for the Cardiff Devils of the Elite Ice Hockey League.

== Junior career ==
Cox began his junior career with the Medicine Hat Tigers of the Western Hockey League. During the 2014–15 WHL season, Cox led the league with 80 assists and was named to the WHL Eastern Conference First All-Star Team. On October 28, 2015, Cox was traded to the Vancouver Giants for Clayton Kirichenko. Cox later joined the Quad City Mallards of the ECHL for the latter stages of the 2015-16 ECHL season including their playoff run before moving to the University of Alberta.

== Career statistics ==
=== Regular season and playoffs ===
			Regular season					Playoffs
Season	Team	League	GP	G	A	Pts	PIM	GP	G	A	Pts	PIM
