= Jeremy Cornish =

Canadian professional ice hockey forward

- Born: December 12, 1979 (age 45); London, Ontario, Canada
- Height: 6 ft 3 in (191 cm)
- Weight: 220 lb (100 kg; 15 st 10 lb)
- Position: Forward
- Shoots: Right
- EIHL team Former teams: Wightlink Raiders; London Racers; Newcastle Vipers; Sheffield Steelers; Basingstoke Bison
- Playing career: 2000–present

Jeremy Cornish (born December 7, 1979) is a Canadian professional ice hockey forward who currently coaches Streatham IHC of the NIHL. While he was playing, he was mainly used as an enforcer.

Born in London, Ontario, Cornish turned pro in 2000, splitting the year in the ECHL with the Dayton Bombers and in the United Hockey League for the Port Huron Border Cats. He also played for the UHL's Flint Generals and the Central Hockey League for the San Angelo Outlaws, Laredo Bucks and the Memphis Riverkings before moving to the United Kingdom in 2004, joining the Elite League's London Racers. He stayed for a second season, but midway through the 2005-06 season, the Racers folded, having been forced to move venues due to safety concerns, stemming from Blaž Emeršič suffering severe facial injuries during a game after being crashed into the boards. The Racers folded, and Cornish moved to the Newcastle Vipers and went on to win the playoff championship. After staying with the Vipers for a second season, he returned to North America, signing for the Bloomington PrairieThunder of the International Hockey League before returning to the UK with the Sheffield Steelers. In 2008, Cornish signed with the Basingstoke Bison. On 12 May 2009, it was announced that Cornish would become the Wightlink Raiders Player/Coach for the 2009-2010 season. The Raiders, the previous week, had announced they were dropping to the English National League from the English Premier League, where they had been since the early 1990s.

As of the 2016/17 season, the Raiders were forced to drop out of the league due to the closure of their rink.

On October 25, 2016, just a few weeks into the season Cornish was appointed Head Coach of Streatham IHC (formerly known as Streatham Redskins). Cornish is also a certified primary school teacher.
