= Joey Martin (ice hockey) =

Canadian ice hockey player

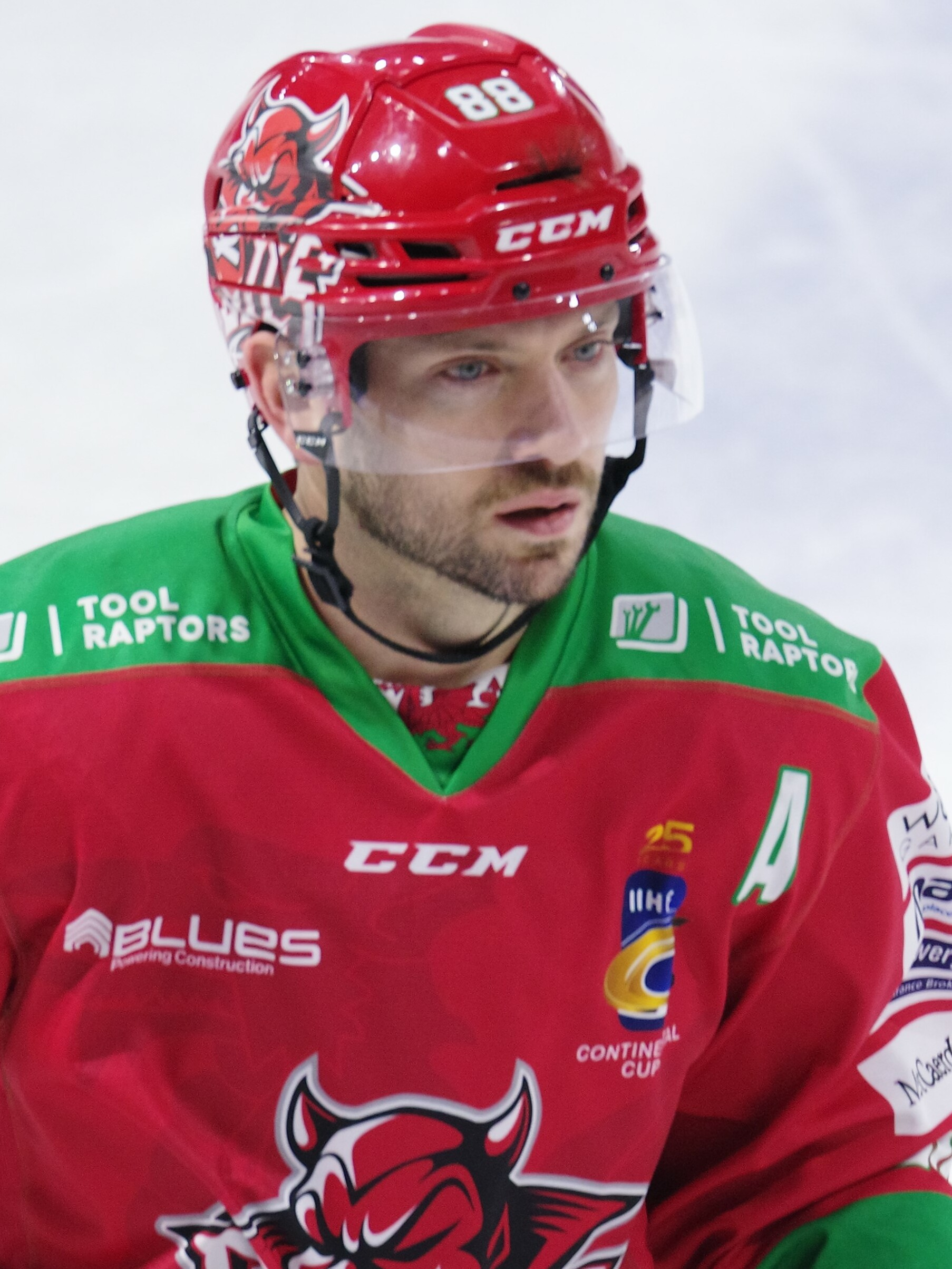
- Martin in 2023
- Born: July 29, 1988 (age 37) Thorold, Ontario, Canada
- Height: 5 ft 10 in (178 cm)
- Weight: 182 lb (83 kg; 13 st 0 lb)
- Position: Centre
- Shoots: Left
- EIHL team Former teams: Cardiff Devils; Houston Aeros; Toledo Walleye; Texas Stars; Bridgeport Sound Tigers; Stockton Thunder; Stavanger Oilers; Graz 99ers
- NHL draft: Undrafted
- Playing career: 2011–present

Joey Martin (born July 29, 1988) is a Canadian professional ice hockey player for UK Elite Ice Hockey League (EIHL) side Cardiff Devils. He has previously played for IceHL side Graz 99ers and the Stavanger Oilers in Norway's GET-ligaen.

== Early life ==
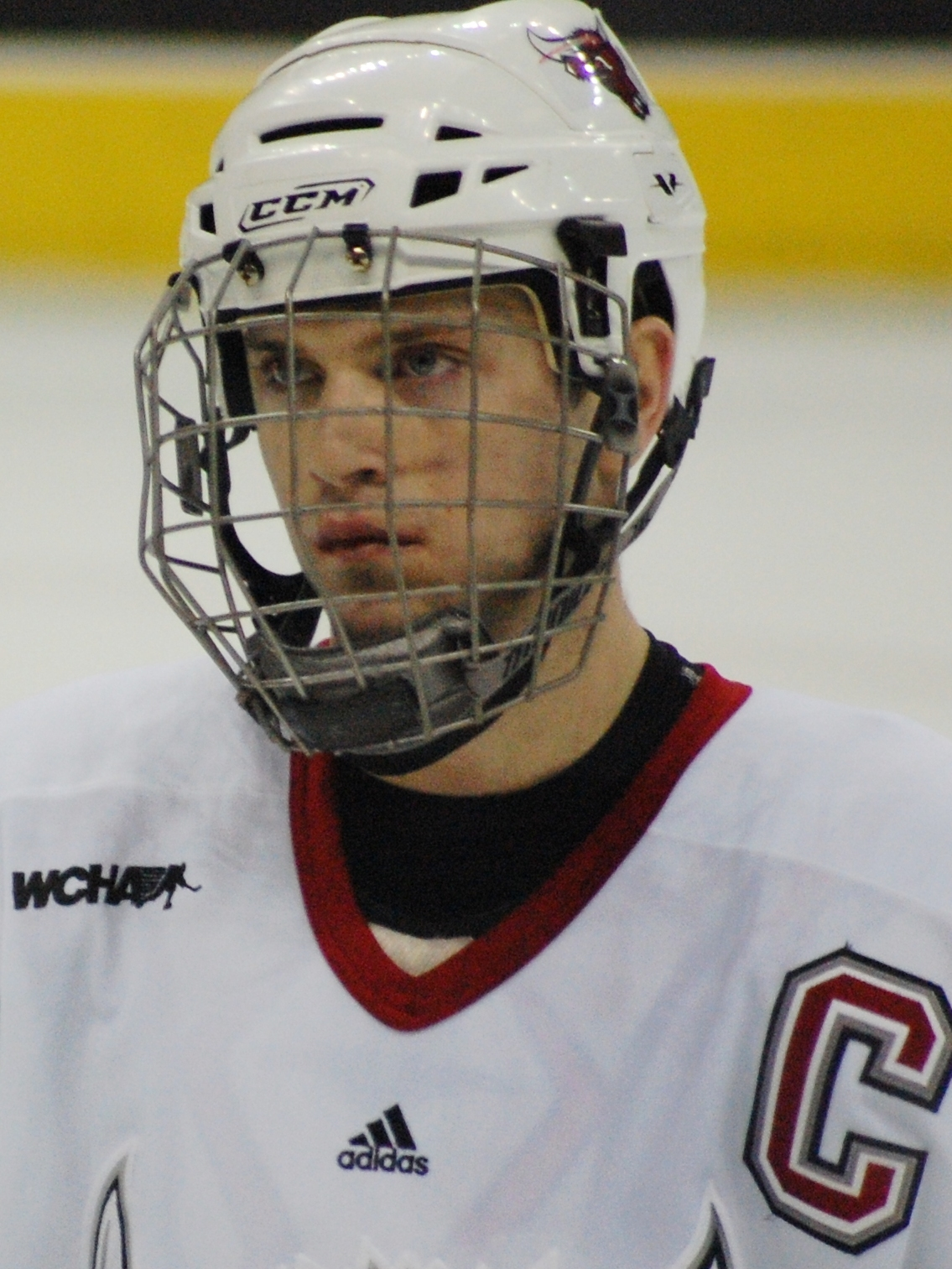
Martin in 2010, playing for the Omaha Mavericks men's ice hockey

Martin was born in Thorold, Ontario. Martin played junior hockey with the Thorold Blackhawks and Aurora Tigers. Martin played four seasons (2007–2011) of NCAA college hockey with the Nebraska–Omaha Mavericks men's ice hockey team, registering 39 goals, 64 assists, and 116 penalty minutes in 152 games played.

== Career ==
On September 6, 2011, the Toledo Walleye announced that Martin had signed to play with their ECHL team for the 2011–12 season.

On July 31, 2014, Martin signed his first contract abroad, agreeing to a one-year deal with the Cardiff Devils of the EIHL.

Martin remained with the Cardiff Devils until 2020, even captaining the side in the 2019–20 season, before joining Norwegian GET-ligaen side Stavanger Oilers on August 27, 2020.

He had initially agreed to return to Cardiff for a seventh season, but due to ongoing coronavirus-induced uncertainty over the 2020-21 EIHL season's proposed start date in December, the Devils allowed Martin to seek a temporary move away from the club.

It was expected Martin would stay at Stavanger for a season and return to Cardiff in 2021. However, in May 2021, it was announced Martin would join Austrian side Graz 99ers ahead of the 2021-22 season.

Martin rejoined Cardiff for a second time in May 2022, moving back to the Elite League for the 2022-23 season. On October 30, 2024, Martin broke the EIHL overseas points record, during a 5-3 loss to Coventry Blaze.
