= 2007–08 EIHL season =

- League: Elite Ice Hockey League
- Sport: Ice hockey
- Duration: September - March

Regular season
- Champions: Coventry Blaze

Playoffs
- Champions: Sheffield Steelers

Challenge Cup
- Champions: Nottingham Panthers

Charity Shield

EIHL seasons
- 2006-07 2008-09

The 2007–08 Elite Ice Hockey League season began September 5, 2007 and ran until April 6, 2008. It was the fifth season of Elite League competition.

The defending league champions were the Coventry Blaze, who were also the holders of the Challenge Cup. The Nottingham Panthers looked to defend the Play Off Championship they won for the first time in eighteen years in 2007.

== Movements between Elite League teams ==
Player	From	To	Date
(Ukraine) Pavel Gomenyuk	Hull Stingrays	Newcastle Vipers	April 19
(Ukraine) Sergiy Rublivsky	Hull Stingrays	Newcastle Vipers	April 24
(United Kingdom) Mark Richardson	Cardiff Devils	Nottingham Panthers	May 1
(United Kingdom) Ashley Tait	Coventry Blaze	Sheffield Steelers	May 9
(United Kingdom) Jonathan Weaver	Newcastle Vipers	Coventry Blaze	May 9
(Canada) Doug Shepard	Basingstoke Bison	Sheffield Steelers	May 10
(United Kingdom) Slava Koulikov	Hull Stingrays	Basingstoke Bison	May 14
(United Kingdom) Phil Hill	Sheffield Steelers	Cardiff Devils	May 17
(United Kingdom) Russ Cowley	Cardiff Devils	Coventry Blaze	May 29
(Canada) Derek Campbell	Manchester Phoenix	Newcastle Vipers	May 31
(United Kingdom) Paul Moran	Sheffield Steelers	Belfast Giants	May 31
(Sweden) Johan Molin	Manchester Phoenix	Nottingham Panthers	June 4
(United Kingdom) Marc Levers	Belfast Giants	Nottingham Panthers	June 6
(Slovakia) Matus Petricko	Nottingham Panthers	Cardiff Devils	June 6
(Canada) Curtis Huppe	Belfast Giants	Coventry Blaze	June 12
(Canada) Jeff Hutchins	Belfast Giants	Newcastle Vipers	July 3
(Canada) Jeremy Cornish	Newcastle Vipers	Sheffield Steelers	July 16

== Charity Shield ==
The season began on September 5, 2007 with a "Charity Shield" style game between the 2006–07 league champions and Challenge Cup winning Coventry Blaze and the playoff champions Nottingham Panthers at the National Ice Centre. The Panthers defeated the Blaze 7-6 to win the inaugural event.

September 5
Nottingham	7 – 6	Coventry	National Ice Centre (19.30)
First period	Ref: Michael Hicks
0-1 Cloutier (Weaver, Ndur) 00.52	Att: 3,500+
0-2 Huppe (Cloutier, Cowley) 05.44
1-2 McAslan (Pelletier, Drouin) SH 13.19
1-3 Martin (Moore) PP 13.57
2-3 Drouin (McAslan, Neilson) SH 15.42
3-3 Drouin (Meyers, Richardson) 18.45
Second period
4-3 Pelletier (Myers) 25.15
4-4 Stewart (Martin, Moore) 4-on-4 32.12
4-5 Cowley (Stewart, Moore) 35.15
5-5 Stancok (Richardson) PP 36.25
Third period
5-6 Carlson (Weaver) SH 40.38
6-6 Neilson (Drouin) PP 41.18
7-6 Drouin (Neilson, McAslan) PP 48.56

== Challenge Cup ==
For the preliminary round, teams were divided into two groups of five with teams playing each of their opponents once with two homes games and two away games. The home and away games for each club were determined by a random draw. The top two in each group advanced to the semi-finals of the competition.

=== Group stage ===
==== Group A ====
	Team	P	W	L	T	GF	GA	Pts
1	Nottingham Panthers	4	3	0	1	12	7	7
2	Cardiff Devils	4	2	1	1	13	9	5
3	Coventry Blaze	4	1	1	2	9	6	4
4	Basingstoke Bison	4	1	2	1	14	18	3
5	Belfast Giants	4	0	3	1	9	17	1

==== Group B ====
	Team	P	W	L	T	GF	GA	Pts
1	Sheffield Steelers	4	3	1	0	15	9	6
2	Newcastle Vipers	4	3	1	0	12	7	6
3	Manchester Phoenix	4	2	2	0	15	11	4
4	Edinburgh Capitals	4	2	2	0	7	10	4
5	Hull Stingrays	4	0	4	0	6	18	0

=== Semi-finals ===
==== Winner A (Nottingham) vs Runner-up B (Newcastle) ====
Date		Home	Away	Result	Venue
1	November 20	Nottingham Panthers 5	Newcastle Vipers 4	Final	National Ice Centre
2	November 30	Newcastle Vipers 1	Nottingham Panthers 5	Final	Metro Radio Arena
Nottingham won 10–5 on aggregate

==== Winner B (Sheffield) vs Runner-up A (Cardiff) ====
Date		Home	Away	Result	Venue
1	November 28	Cardiff Devils 4	Sheffield Steelers 4	Final	Cardiff Bay Ice Rink
2	December 5	Sheffield Steelers 2	Cardiff Devils 0	Final	IceSheffield
Sheffield won 6–4 on aggregate

=== Final ===
Date		Home	Away	Result	Venue
1	January 23	Sheffield Steelers 3	Nottingham Panthers 6	Final	Sheffield Arena
2	February 20	Nottingham Panthers 3	Sheffield Steelers 4	Final	National Ice Centre
Nottingham won 9–7 on aggregate

== League ==
Regular season standings	GP	W	L	OTL	GF	GA	Pts
Coventry Blaze	54	41	11	2	217	157	85
Sheffield Steelers	54	38	14	2	190	128	78
Nottingham Panthers	54	33	18	3	172	133	69
Belfast Giants	54	33	19	2	184	150	68
Newcastle Vipers	54	28	22	4	159	174	60
Cardiff Devils	54	26	25	3	164	174	55
Manchester Phoenix	54	23	28	3	162	179	49
Edinburgh Capitals	54	19	32	3	155	208	41
Basingstoke Bison	54	16	33	5	172	222	37
Hull Stingrays	54	13	34	7	119	197	33

== Playoffs ==
Quarter-finals
1	Coventry Blaze	4
8	Edinburgh Capitals	2
4	Belfast Giants	6
5	Newcastle Vipers	7
2	Sheffield Steelers	9
7	Manchester Phoenix	8
3	Nottingham Panthers	6
6	Cardiff Devils	7

Semi-finals
1	Coventry Blaze	4
5	Newcastle Vipers	2
2	Sheffield Steelers	2
6	Cardiff Devils	1

Final
1	Coventry Blaze	0
2	Sheffield Steelers	2

== Footnotes ==
Preceded by 2006–07 EIHL season	EIHL seasons	Succeeded by 2008–09 EIHL season
