= 2009–10 EIHL season =

- League: Elite Ice Hockey League
- Sport: Ice hockey
- Duration: September - March

Regular season
- Champions: Coventry Blaze

Playoffs
- Champions: Belfast Giants

Challenge Cup
- Champions: Nottingham Panthers

EIHL seasons
- 2008–09 2010–11

The 2009–10 EIHL season is the seventh season of the Elite Ice Hockey League. It began in September 2009 and concluded in April 2010.

== League business ==
On 25 March 2009, Basingstoke Bison announced their decision to depart from the Elite Ice Hockey League to join the second tier English Premier League, citing considerable financial losses as their reason for withdrawing. In the build up to the 2008–09 season finale, rumours circulated over the possible exclusion from the league of the Edinburgh Capitals, Manchester Phoenix and Newcastle Vipers, and the EIHL operating with six teams. Although it was initially stated that the league would continue with nine teams, it was announced on 1 May 2009 that Manchester Phoenix would also play in the English Premier League.

The resulting change in the format will see teams play a 56-game schedule, facing each of their opponents 8 times (4 home, 4 away) during the course of the regular season.

== Teams ==
Team	Arena(s)
Belfast Giants	Odyssey Arena
Cardiff Devils	Cardiff Arena
Coventry Blaze	SkyDome Arena
Edinburgh Capitals	Murrayfield Ice Rink
Hull Stingrays	Hull Arena
Newcastle Vipers	Whitley Bay Ice Rink
Nottingham Panthers	National Ice Centre
Sheffield Steelers	Motorpoint Arena/IceSheffield

== Elite League Table ==
Team positions determine seeding for Play Offs

Regular season standings	GP	W	OTW	OTL	L	Pts
Coventry Blaze	56	33	5	0	18	76
Belfast Giants	56	32	1	5	16	75
Nottingham Panthers	56	29	5	2	20	70
Cardiff Devils	56	25	6	3	22	65
Sheffield Steelers	56	21	3	6	26	54
Edinburgh Capitals	56	18	4	8	26	52
Newcastle Vipers	56	17	4	4	31	46
Hull Stingrays	56	14	5	5	32	43

GP=Games Played W=Win, OTW=Over Time Wins, OTW=Over Time Loses, L=Loses, Pts=Points,

== Elite League playoffs ==
After two legged quarter finals the end of season playoffs were held at the National Ice Centre in Nottingham from 3 to 4 April. The final was contested between the Cardiff Devils and the Belfast Giants. The match was 2–2 after all three periods and stayed 2–2 after 10 minutes of sudden death overtime. The match then went to a shootout which the Belfast Giants won in the sudden death stage of the shootout 1–0.

Quarter-finals
1	Coventry Blaze	6 (2,4)
8	Hull Stingrays	2 (1,1)
4	Cardiff Devils	9 (4,5)
5	Sheffield Steelers	5 (2,3)
3	Nottingham Panthers	9 (5,4)
6	Edinburgh Capitals	4 (0,4)
2	Belfast Giants	10 (4,6)
7	Newcastle Vipers	3 (1,2)

Semi-finals
Coventry Blaze	3
Cardiff Devils	6
Nottingham Panthers	1
Belfast Giants	1 (3-2 pens)

Final
Cardiff Devils	2
Belfast Giants	2 (1-0 pens)

== 20/20 Hockey Fest ==
The 2009-10 Elite League Ice hockey season begun with a one-day competition at Sheffield Steelers, Sheffield Arena. The tournament was called the 20/20 Hockey fest and was designed to make British Ice hockey more exciting. It contested of 2 periods of 20-minute non-stop clock. The tournament winners were the hosts the Sheffield Steelers.

Quarter-finals

Sheffield Steelers 5-1 Hull Stingrays Belfast Giants 2-3 Cardiff Devils (After Penalty Shoot out) Edinburgh Capitals 0-1 Newcastle Vipers Coventry Blaze 6-0 Nottingham Panthers

Semi-finals

Sheffield Steelers 4-1 Cardiff Devils Newcastle Vipers 2-3 Coventry Blaze

Final

Sheffield Steelers 3-2 Coventry Blaze
