= British Knockout Cup =

Ice Hockey League competition

The British Knockout Cup was an Elite Ice Hockey League competition originally created to fill the void left by the demise of the London Racers in the 2005–06 season. The first winners of the cup were the Sheffield Steelers who defeated the Coventry Blaze on penalty shots in the final.

The format was a home/away affair in the first year of play. In the 2006–07 season, the format was altered with the final being a one-off game. The 2006-07 cup was won by the Cardiff Devils, when they beat the Coventry Blaze 3–0 at the Coventry Skydome.

== 2008–09 ==
The British Knockout Cup will be a nine-team affair this season, with Sheffield and Belfast competing in a preliminary two-legged round at Ice Sheffield on the 25 and 26 October. The first match of the two ended in a 3–3 draw with both teams really battling it out, but the following night the Belfast Giants came out on top 6–5 and it was they who progress with an aggregate score of (9-8) to face Coventry Blaze in the quarter-finals.

Quarter-Finals

This Quarter Final between these two heavyweights was all tied up in the 1st leg with the Giants winning their home leg by a 5-1 scoreline, the same performance from the Giants saw them defeat the Blaze in their own backyard by a score of 5–2, this saw the Giants progress even further to the semi-finals to face Cardiff Devils. Agg:(10-45)

The Devils got their place in the semi's by destroying the Basingstoke Bison by an aggregate score of (17-1), the Devils won their home leg 8-0 and then went to Basingstoke and completely out-played the Bison and winning 10–20.

The Newcastle Vipers fought hard to book their semi-final place by winning there tie in penalty shots. The first leg ended with the Vipers taking a one-goal lead to Edinburgh (5-4), the second leg was as hard-fought as the first with Edinburgh not going out without a fight and their spirit took the tie into overtime with Capitals winning 2–1 in regulation time. Neither of the teams could find a breakthrough so penalty shoot-out it was, with the Vipers coming out victorious 500–9. Agg:(10-10)

The Phoenix were the other team to go through to make up the Final Four. They won their tie against the Stingrays by an aggregate of (8-3). The home leg was the easier of the two by shutting out Hull and winning it 4–0, the second leg was much, much harder with Hull giving it a real try, but could not faze the Phoenix as Manchester came out on top again with a score of 4–3.

Semi-Finals

It was Belfast who would progress again by an aggregate score of (7-4). The Giants and Devils played a tough game with even honours coming at the end of the home leg which was played at Dundonald Ice Bowl (3-3). The second leg was so much different as it was the Giants who made the push to win the tie and their pressure paid off as they won 4–1.

The Phoenix will be the team to face the Giants from Belfast in this year's Final, as they defeated Newcastle (9-5) on aggregate. The Phoenix won the first leg in Newcastle easily 4–1. The Phoenix brought home a 3-goal lead, thinking it was over, but the Vipers had other ideas as they tried to get back into the tie, but they came up short as they lost 5–4.

Final

Belfast Giants beat Manchester Phoenix in the final, with an aggregate score of 7–5. The first leg was played at the Altrincham Ice Dome, and finished 3-3 after normal time. As this match was also the final league match of the season, Phoenix went on to win 4–3 in overtime, but as the score was 3-3 after 60 minutes, this was counted as the aggregate score. The Giants won the return leg 4–2 at the Odyssey Arena with no problem at all, winning the Knockout Cup.

== Winners ==
- 2005-06 - Sheffield Steelers
- 2006-07 - Cardiff Devils
- 2007-08 - Coventry Blaze
- 2008-09 - Belfast Giants
