= Curtis Bowen =

Canadian ice hockey player (born 1974)

- Born: March 24, 1974 (age 52) Kenora, ON, Canada
- Height: 6 ft 1 in (185 cm)
- Weight: 205 lb (93 kg; 14 st 9 lb)
- Position: Left wing
- Shot: Left
- Played for: Adirondack Red Wings; Manitoba Moose; Nottingham Panthers; Manchester Storm; Belfast Giants
- NHL draft: 22nd overall, 1992; Detroit Red Wings
- Playing career: 1994–2006

Curtis Bowen (born March 24, 1974, in Kenora, Ontario) is a retired professional ice hockey player. He was drafted in the first round (22nd overall) by the Detroit Red Wings in the 1992 NHL entry draft.

== Playing career ==
Bowen rose to prominence in the OHL playing with the Ottawa 67's. He played left wing and helped the 67's in both an offensive and defensive role. After the NHL Draft, Bowen played two more years in the OHL before moving up to the AHL as a member of the Adirondack Red Wings. He made the Canadian National Team in 1995 and 1997. After his most recent national appearance he signed with the Manitoba Moose of the IHL and lead them to a second-place finish in the Midwest Division. Soon after he joined the emerging Elite Ice Hockey League in the United Kingdom. He played for the Nottingham Panthers in 1999 and later signed with the Manchester Storm and the Belfast Giants, spending one and four years respectively with each team. Bowen last played for the Nottingham Panthers in 2005-2006.

== Career statistics ==
=== Regular season and playoffs ===
			Regular season					Playoffs
Season	Team	League	GP	G	A	Pts	PIM	GP	G	A	Pts	PIM
1990–91	Ottawa 67's	OHL	42	12	14	26	31	—	—	—	—	—
1991–92	Ottawa 67's	OHL	65	31	45	76	94	11	3	7	10	11
1992–93	Ottawa 67's	OHL	21	9	19	28	51	—	—	—	—	—
1993–94	Ottawa 67's	OHL	52	25	37	62	98	17	8	13	21	14
1994–95	Adirondack Red Wings	AHL	64	6	11	17	71	4	0	2	2	4
1995–96	Canada	Intl	31	8	8	16	48	—	—	—	—	—
1995–96	Adirondack Red Wings	AHL	3	0	0	0	0	—	—	—	—	—
1996–97	Adirondack Red Wings	AHL	78	11	11	22	110	4	0	0	0	2
1997–98	Canada	Intl	46	8	22	30	73	—	—	—	—	—
1998–99	Minnesota Moose	IHL	45	10	12	22	54	—	—	—	—	—
1999–2000	Nottingham Panthers	BISL	36	6	15	21	98	6	0	2	2	12
2000–01	Manchester Storm	BISL	33	11	20	31	37	6	4	2	6	2
2001–02	Belfast Giants	BISL	48	12	16	28	83	6	1	1	2	6
2002–03	Belfast Giants	BISL	26	6	7	13	66	6	2	0	2	4
2003–04	Belfast Giants	EIHL	47	27	39	66	86	4	0	2	2	10
2004–05	Belfast Giants	EIHL	30	11	16	27	42	8	2	3	5	10
2005–06	Nottingham Panthers	EIHL	44	12	17	29	50	6	1	5	6	8
AHL totals			145	17	22	39	181	8	0	2	2	6
BISL totals			143	35	58	93	284	24	7	5	12	24
EIHL totals			121	50	72	122	178	18	3	10	13	28

=== International ===
Year	Team	Event	GP	G	A	Pts	PIM
1994	Canada	WJC	7	2	0	2	10

== Personal life ==
Bowen was formerly involved with British television presenter Christine Bleakley; they broke up in 2003.

Preceded by Martin Lapointe	Detroit Red Wings first-round draft pick 1992	Succeeded by Anders Eriksson
