= Sport in Northern Ireland =

Sport in Northern Ireland plays an important role in the lives of many Northern Irish people. Most sports are organised on an all-Ireland basis, for example rugby union, Gaelic games, basketball, rugby league, hockey, and cricket, whereas others, like association football and netball are organised on a separate basis for Northern Ireland. The three most popular spectator sports in Northern Ireland are association football with 10%, Gaelic football with 8% and rugby union with 6%.

As Northern Ireland is a constituent nation of the United Kingdom, it sends a Northern Ireland Team to the Commonwealth Games. At the Olympic Games, a person from Northern Ireland can choose to represent either Ireland or Great Britain.

== Association football ==
Football is one of the most popular sports in Northern Ireland. The Irish Football Association (IFA) is the organising body for football (soccer) in Northern Ireland, and was historically the governing body for the whole of the island. The IFA sits on the International Football Association Board, which is responsible for the laws of the game.

The Northern Ireland Women's Football Association (NIWFA) is the IFA's women's football arm. It runs a Women's Cup, Women's League and the Northern Ireland women's national football team.

Many football fans in Northern Ireland prefer to support teams from England such as Manchester United and Liverpool and teams from Scotland such as Celtic and Rangers.

=== Domestic competitions ===
The domestic league is the IFA Premiership. Some of the major teams include Linfield F.C., and Glentoran F.C. Derry City FC is based in Northern Ireland but plays in the Republic of Ireland's league.

The Milk Cup is a successful international youth tournament held annually in Northern Ireland, in which clubs and national teams from anywhere in the world may compete. Northern Ireland also played host to the 2005 UEFA Under-19 European Championships.

The Setanta Sports Cup was set up by its sponsors, television channel Setanta Ireland. It is an all-island tournament, featuring twelve teams, six from the League of Ireland and six from the Irish League. Despite fairly low turn-outs for each jurisdiction's leagues, the Setanta Cup drew relatively successful gate receipts and in five editions has had one winner from Northern Ireland (Linfield in 2005).

=== National team ===
Northern Ireland's international team, despite a poor run of form in the late 1990s and first few years of the 21st century, and a corresponding slump in the FIFA World Rankings, enjoyed great success in the early and mid-1980s and recently had a revival in their fortunes under manager former Lawrie Sanchez, with home wins over Spain and England.

Most of the players come from the English or Scottish leagues although occasional appearances of Irish League players have been known.

== Rugby union ==
Rugby union is a very popular team sport played in Ireland. The sport is organised on an all-Ireland basis with one team, governing body and league for both the Republic of Ireland and Northern Ireland.

The Irish Rugby Football Union is the governing body for rugby union in Ireland. The IRFU is divided into four branches which represent the four provinces of Ireland: Ulster, Munster, Leinster and Connacht.

=== Competitions ===
Irish provinces compete in the United Rugby Championship, against Welsh regions, Italian cities, Scottish super-districts, and South African regions. Through performance in the URC, the four Irish provinces qualify to compete in the European Rugby Champions Cup and the EPCR Challenge Cup.

Competitions have taken place since the late 19th century with the modern day Inter-provincial Championship between Munster, Leinster, Ulster and Connacht first contested in 1920.

Another focus for the domestic game in Ireland is the All-Ireland League, which started in 1990. For the 2022–23 season, there will be 5 divisions.

=== The All-Ireland national team ===
The Ireland national team are considered by the IRB to be in the first tier.

Ireland contest the Millennium Trophy with England as part of the Six Nations Championship.

Every four years the British and Irish Lions go on tour with players from Ireland as well as England, Scotland and Wales.

== Gaelic games ==
Gaelic games include Gaelic football, hurling, and Gaelic handball.

=== Governing body ===
Gaelic games in the North are controlled by the Ulster Provincial Board, which covers all nine counties of Ulster.

=== Competitions ===
Every footballer or hurler plays for a local club, with the best players being selected for county panels. Each county has its own county championship, with the winners going on to play in the Ulster Senior Club Football Championship or Ulster Senior Club Hurling Championship. Crossmaglen Rangers are currently the most successful football club in the North.

The county teams play in pre-season competitions, such as the National Football League, which serves as preparation for the Ulster Senior Football Championship and All-Ireland Senior Football Championship. The hurling equivalents are the National Hurling League, Ulster Senior Hurling Championship and All-Ireland Senior Hurling Championship. In recent years, the most successful football teams from the North have been Tyrone GAA and Armagh GAA. Hurling teams from have found it difficult to make an impact against the top counties from the South, with Antrim GAA the most successful.

County players may be selected for the Ulster provincial side to play in the Railway Cup. The team has won the Interprovincial Football Championship 32 times, but has never won the Interprovincial Hurling Championship. At international level, footballers can play for the Ireland International Rules football team against the best Australian Rules football players from Australia. Hurlers playing in the lower divisions of the All-Ireland Championship are eligible to play against the best shinty players from Scotland in composite rules shinty-hurling.

== Cricket ==
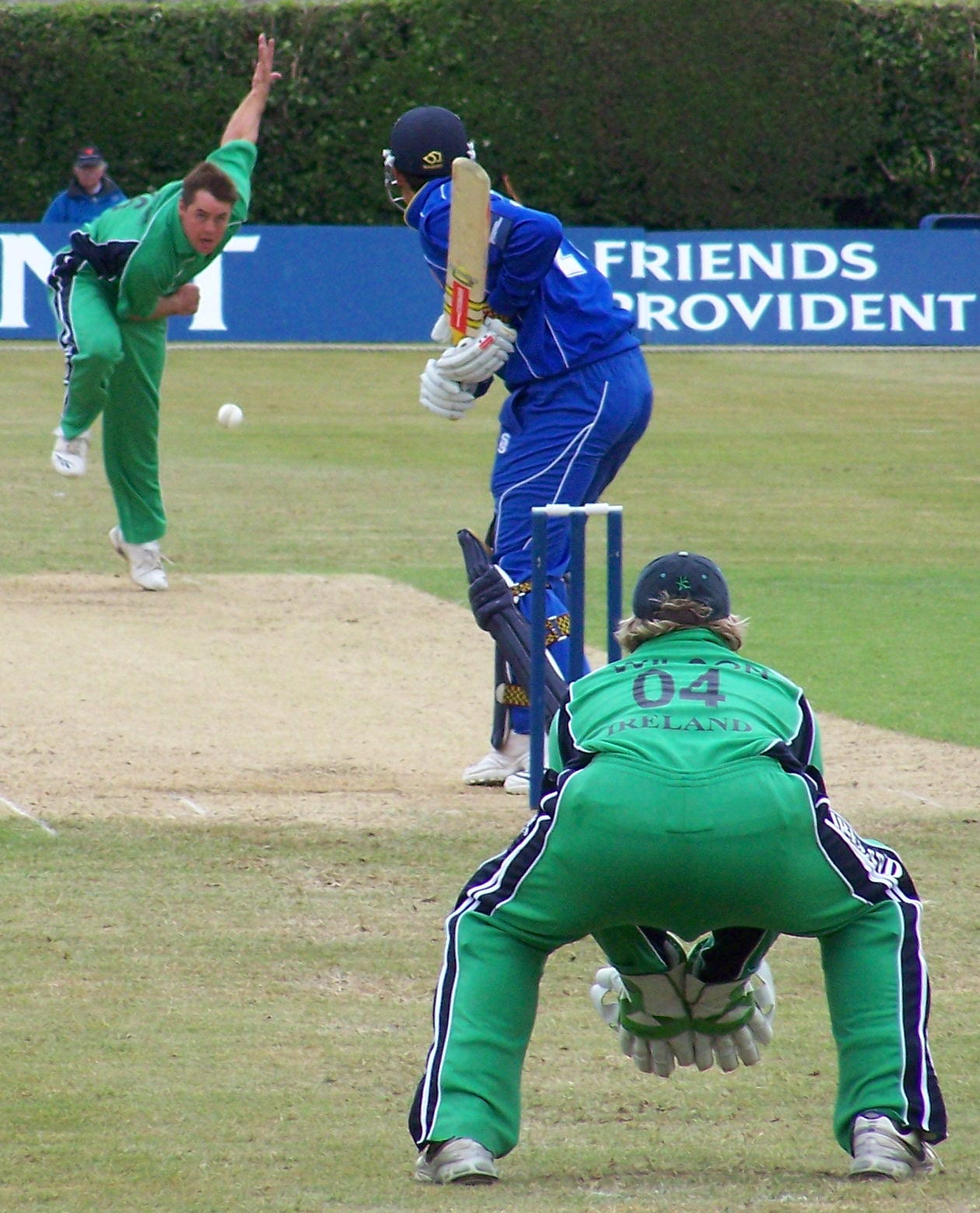
Ireland compete against Essex at Castle Avenue.

Cricket in Northern Ireland was a minority sport until the early 21st century, but has since increased in popularity. The Irish Cricket Team, which represents both Northern Ireland and the Republic of Ireland, qualified for the Cricket World Cup in 2007 and 2011. Cricket has been played in Northern Ireland since the early 19th century and games against Scotland (a match which has first-class status) have been played annually since 1909. As of 2024, Dublin-born batsman Ed Joyce was a part of Ireland's ICC Trophy team and a member of the Middlesex side in England's County Championship; he captained the county in 2004. Interest in Irish cricket was also generated by the national team's unexpected victory over West Indies in 1969; they did it again in June 2004.

The sport is organised on an all-island basis and is overseen by the Cricket Ireland, founded in its present incarnation in 1923. Ireland has entered some domestic English tournaments since the early 1980s, but becoming an Associate Member of the International Cricket Council in 1993 paved the way for participation in international competition, and the 2005 ICC Trophy was hosted by Ireland. The Irish finished second in the tournament, beaten by Scotland. Ireland co-hosted the Cricket World Cup in 1999. Dublin also hosted one game of the 1999 World Cup. The 2007 World Cup, which was held in the West Indies, was a successful tournament for the Irish Cricket team. Having qualified for the first time for the tournament, Ireland entered the arena with much to gain. Ireland tied the match with Test Cricket playing team Zimbabwe and shocked Pakistan by defeating them on St. Patrick's Day. Ireland qualified for the super 8 and recorded some good results, including a win against Bangladesh. Ireland were granted ODI status and now they appear in the ODI ranking table. In June 2007, Ireland played ODI matches against India and South Africa.

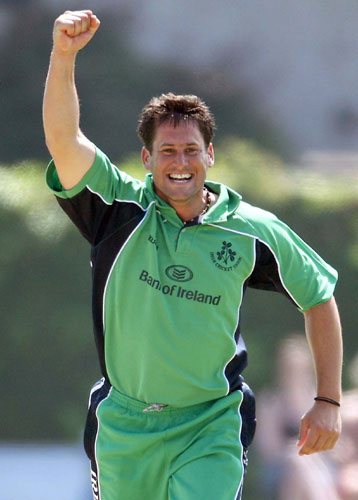
International cricketer, Thinus Fourie

Ireland went on to win the 2009 ICC World Cup Qualifier, securing their place in the 2011 Cricket World Cup and ODI status for the next four years. At the World Cup, they made history by beating a heavily favoured England in pool play with the largest successful run chase in World Cup history, led by the fastest century in World Cup history from Kevin O'Brien.

On 22 June 2017, Ireland was awarded Test status following a five-year fight, becoming the eleventh team to have Test status. Ireland's first Test match was at home to Pakistan in May 2018, losing by 5 wickets after being forced to follow on. After a tour to Afghanistan, Ireland faced England in a four-day Test match at Lord's in July 2019, bowling England out for 85 before losing by 143 runs. Ireland's second innings, in which they were bowled out for 38 in 15.4 overs, was the lowest completed innings in the history of Lord's.

In November 2019, the Irish cricket team qualified for the 2020 T20 World Cup, to be held in Australia.

== Motorsport ==
Northern Ireland is known as being a centre for motorcycle road racing, staging International and Irish National races.

Two international races, the North West 200 and the Ulster Grand Prix, were previously held in Northern Ireland. However, due to financing and sponsorship issues affecting the Ulster Grand Prix, the future of the meeting continues to remain open to question, with the last running of the event occurring in 2019. Consequently, as of 2024, only the North West 200 features on the International Road Racing calendar.

Irish National meetings comprise the Cookstown 100 and the Armoy Road Races. Formerly the calendar also included the Tandragee 100, the Enniskillen Road Races and the Mid-Antrim 150.

Road racer Joey Dunlop was voted as Northern Ireland's greatest ever sportsperson in a Belfast Telegraph poll, ahead of footballer George Best. During his career, Dunlop took five consecutive Formula I World Championships, 26 Isle of Man TTs, 13 wins at the North West 200 and 24 victories at the Ulster GP, and attracted support from both the Protestant and Catholic communities. In addition, his brother Robert and nephews Michael and William have also been successful road racers, with all three taking multiple wins at the North West 200 and Ulster GP and Robert and Michael also taking several TT victories.

Other notable road racers from the province include Phillip McCallen, who took 11 TT wins, including four in one week in 1996, five wins out of six races at the 1992 North West 200, five wins on one day at the 1996 Ulster GP, as well as the Macau Grand Prix, and Ryan Farquhar, another multiple winner at the TT, North West 200 and Ulster GP, who took a total of 384 wins during his career.

On the track, Jonathan Rea broke records in the World Superbike Championship in 2018, when he became the first rider to win four consecutive Superbike world titles. He also holds the records for most wins and most podiums in the championship. One of Rea's main rivals in Superbikes has been fellow Ulsterman Eugene Laverty. In Grand Prix racing, Belfast native Ralph Bryans was 50cc World Champion in 1965, becoming the only Irish rider to win a Grand Prix world title: he also took ten Grand Prix wins across his career.

On four wheels, Northern Ireland's most notable Formula One drivers are John Watson, who took five Grand Prix wins in the 1970s and 1980s and finished third in the 1982 Formula One season, and Eddie Irvine, who took four wins for Ferrari on the way to second place in the 1999 Formula One season. In touring car racing, Colin Turkington is a four time British Touring Car Champion, having won titles in 2009, 2014, 2018 and 2019, and has also been a race winner in the World Touring Car Championship. In rallying, the province's most notable names are Paddy Hopkirk, who won several events in international rallying in the 1960s in his Mini Cooper S, including the Monte Carlo Rally, the Alpine Rally and the Acropolis Rally, and Kris Meeke, who has taken multiple rally wins in the World Rally Championship.

== Golf ==
Golf is a very popular sport in Northern Ireland. Golfers from Northern Ireland enjoyed great success especially in the 2010s. Between 2010 and 2015 Graeme McDowell, Darren Clarke and Rory McIlroy won 25% of the titles in Major Championships.

== Basketball ==
For more international exposure, athletes from Northern Ireland have joined forces with Ireland and represent the Island of Ireland together as its own national team. The governing body of all basketball activities in the country is Basketball Northern Ireland.

== Ice hockey ==
The Belfast Giants have competed in the Elite Ice Hockey League since the 2000–01 season and are the sole Northern Irish team in the league. The team's roster has featured Northern Irish born players such as Mark Morrison and Graeme Walton.

Geraldine Heaney, an Olympic gold medalist and one of the first women inducted into the IIHF Hall of Fame, competed internationally for Canada but was born in Northern Ireland.

Owen Nolan is a Canadian former professional ice hockey player born in Northern Ireland. He was drafted 1st overall in the 1990 NHL Draft by the Quebec Nordiques.

== Boxing ==
Boxing is a popular sport in Northern Ireland. Prominent Northern Irish boxers include Carl Frampton, Ryan Burnett, Wayne McCullough and Paddy Barnes, among others .

== Professional wrestling ==
In 2003, independent wrestlers formed Ulster Championship Wrestling (UCW). This was Northern Ireland's first wrestling promotion. Due to a number of problems, UCW folded in 2007. Also in 2007, Pro Wrestling Ulster (PWU) formed. They bought out UCW and began their own wrestling promotion. Pro Wrestling Ulster hosts IPPV's and events in Northern Ireland showcasing local, national and former WWE talent. PWU folded in 2019.

A new promotion and wrestling school Titanic Wrestling started up in April 2019. It is owned by local wrestler JDP. Former WWE NXT UK star Tucker takes training sessions in Titanic's school The Yard.

== Student sport ==
Universities in Northern Ireland participate in sport through both Student Sport Ireland (SSI) and British Universities and Colleges Sport (BUCS).

== See also ==
- Sport Northern Ireland
- Sport in Ireland
- Sport in the United Kingdom
- Sport in England
- Sport in Scotland
- Sport in Wales
