= Colin Ward (ice hockey) =

Canadian ice hockey player

- Born: September 5, 1970 (age 54); Edmonton, Alberta, Canada
- Height: 5 ft 11 in (180 cm)
- Weight: 195 lb (88 kg; 13 st 13 lb)
- Position: Forward
- Shot: Right
- Played for: Nashville Knights; Atlanta Knights; Utah Grizzlies; Dayton Bombers; HC Gherdëina; Bracknell Bees; Belfast Giants
- NHL draft: Undrafted
- Playing career: 1994–2004

Colin Ward (born September 5, 1970) is a Canadian retired ice hockey forward.

== Early life ==
Ward was born in Edmonton, Alberta. He played junior hockey with the Red Deer Rustlers and New Westminster Royals. Ward was a member of the Western Michigan Broncos men's ice hockey team for four years.

== Career ==
After playing in the IHL and ECHL, Ward moved to the United Kingdom in 1997, signing for the Bracknell Bees. With the team, Ward won the British Ice Hockey Superleague title in 2000. He then moved to the newly formed Belfast Giants in 2001 and won his second Superleague title in 2002 in the Giants' second year in the league. Ward retired in 2004 after seven seasons in the UK. His number 11 jersey was retired by the Belfast Giants.

== Career statistics ==
			Regular season					Playoffs
Season	Team	League	GP	G	A	Pts	PIM	GP	G	A	Pts	PIM
1987–88	Red Deer Rustlers	AJHL	53	16	21	37	160	—	—	—	—	—
1988–89	Red Deer Rustlers	AJHL	57	41	28	69	76	—	—	—	—	—
1989–90	New Westminster Royals	BCJHL	48	31	33	64	48	—	—	—	—	—
1990–91	Western Michigan University	NCAA	42	10	13	23	36	—	—	—	—	—
1991–92	Western Michigan University	NCAA	36	25	14	39	60	—	—	—	—	—
1992–93	Western Michigan University	NCAA	37	22	11	33	48	—	—	—	—	—
1993–94	Western Michigan University	NCAA	40	31	19	50	66	—	—	—	—	—
1994–95	Atlanta Knights	IHL	5	2	3	5	2	2	0	0	0	0
1994–95	Nashville Knights	ECHL	64	41	29	70	108	12	11	4	15	10
1995–96	Atlanta Knights	IHL	1	0	0	0	0	—	—	—	—	—
1995–96	Utah Grizzlies	IHL	3	0	1	1	0	—	—	—	—	—
1995–96	Nashville Knights	ECHL	65	52	55	107	43	5	4	2	6	6
1996–97	HC Gherdëina	Italy	41	40	55	95	52	—	—	—	—	—
1997–98	Dayton Bombers	ECHL	7	2	1	3	16	—	—	—	—	—
1997–98	Bracknell Bees	BISL	32	18	10	28	22	6	3	2	5	4
1998–99	Bracknell Bees	BISL	41	12	16	28	24	7	0	2	2	4
1999–00	Bracknell Bees	BISL	42	18	20	38	16	3	0	1	1	0
2000–01	Belfast Giants	BISL	44	14	15	29	34	6	4	2	6	4
2001–02	Belfast Giants	BISL	48	20	21	41	32	6	0	3	3	2
2002–03	Belfast Giants	BISL	32	7	10	17	22	18	4	6	10	6
2003–04	Belfast Giants	EIHL	47	27	31	58	50	4	1	1	2	2
ECHL totals			136	95	85	180	167	17	15	6	21	16
BISL totals			239	89	92	181	150	46	11	16	27	20
