= Jason Bowen (ice hockey) =

Canadian ice hockey player (born 1973)

- Born: November 9, 1973 (age 52) Port Alice, British Columbia, Canada
- Height: 6 ft 4 in (193 cm)
- Weight: 220 lb (100 kg; 15 st 10 lb)
- Position: Defence
- Shot: Left
- Played for: Belfast Giants; Philadelphia Flyers; Edmonton Oilers
- NHL draft: 15th overall, 1992; Philadelphia Flyers
- Playing career: 1993–2006

Jason Bowen (born November 9, 1973) is a Canadian retired professional ice hockey player. He was a defenceman and left winger who played in 77 National Hockey League (NHL) games with the Philadelphia Flyers and Edmonton Oilers over six seasons.

== Playing career ==
After serving a four-year apprenticeship in the Western Hockey League with the Tri-City Americans, he was drafted by the Philadelphia Flyers in the first round of the 1992 NHL entry draft, 15th overall, where he began his six-season NHL career, alternating with the Flyers' American Hockey League affiliate, the Philadelphia Phantoms.

Bowen then moved to the Edmonton Oilers, also in the NHL, where he played four games and then played for the Hamilton Bulldogs, the Hershey Bears and Saint John Flames, all in the AHL. Moving to Belfast in 2000, he has played for the Scottish Eagles in Glasgow and then the Guildford Flames in the BNL before returning to the Giants.

== Career statistics ==
			Regular season					Playoffs
Season	Team	League	GP	G	A	Pts	PIM	GP	G	A	Pts	PIM
1988–89	Notre Dame Hounds Midget AAA	SMHL	56	10	29	39	40	—	—	—	—	—
1989–90	Tri-City Americans	WHL	61	8	5	13	129	7	0	3	3	4
1990–91	Tri-City Americans	WHL	60	7	13	20	252	6	2	2	4	18
1991–92	Tri-City Americans	WHL	19	5	3	8	135	5	0	1	1	42
1992–93	Tri-City Americans	WHL	62	10	12	22	219	3	1	1	2	18
1992–93	Philadelphia Flyers	NHL	7	1	0	1	2	—	—	—	—	—
1993–94	Philadelphia Flyers	NHL	56	1	5	6	87	—	—	—	—	—
1994–95	Philadelphia Flyers	NHL	4	0	0	0	0	—	—	—	—	—
1994–95	Hershey Bears	AHL	55	5	5	10	116	6	0	0	0	46
1995–96	Philadelphia Flyers	NHL	2	0	0	0	2	—	—	—	—	—
1995–96	Hershey Bears	AHL	72	6	7	13	128	4	2	0	2	13
1996–97	Philadelphia Flyers	NHL	4	0	1	1	8	—	—	—	—	—
1996–97	Philadelphia Phantoms	AHL	61	10	12	22	160	6	0	1	1	10
1997–98	Philadelphia Phantoms	AHL	3	0	0	0	19	—	—	—	—	—
1997–98	Edmonton Oilers	NHL	4	0	0	0	10	—	—	—	—	—
1997–98	Hamilton Bulldogs	AHL	51	5	14	19	108	7	1	1	2	22
1998–99	Hamilton Bulldogs	AHL	58	3	3	6	178	11	0	1	1	16
1999–00	Hershey Bears	AHL	54	2	8	10	152	—	—	—	—	—
1999–00	Saint John Flames	AHL	11	0	1	1	28	2	0	0	0	4
2000–01	Belfast Giants	BISL	45	5	6	11	92	6	1	2	3	6
2001–02	Belfast Giants	BISL	31	4	8	12	105	6	0	1	1	10
2002–03	Scottish Eagles	BISL	8	1	1	2	6	—	—	—	—	—
2002–03	Guildford Flames	BISL	25	3	12	15	86	8	0	2	2	14
2003–04	Belfast Giants	EIHL	48	8	14	22	166	4	0	0	0	4
2004–05	Belfast Giants	EIHL	30	3	8	11	68	8	2	1	3	16
2005–06	Belfast Giants	EIHL	44	4	3	7	102	7	2	1	3	10
NHL totals			77	2	6	8	109	—	—	—	—	—
AHL totals			365	31	50	81	889	36	3	3	6	111

Preceded by Ryan Sittler	Philadelphia Flyers' first-round draft pick 1992	Succeeded by Brian Boucher
