= Adam Keefe =

Adam Keefe may refer to:

- Adam Keefe (basketball) (born 1970), American basketball player
- Adam Keefe (ice hockey) (born 1984), Canadian ice hockey player

== See also ==
- Adam Keefe Horovitz or Ad-Rock (born 1966), American hip-hop singer with Beastie Boys
