= Colin Ward (disambiguation) =

Colin Ward (1924–2010) was a British anarchist author and editor

Colin Ward is also the name of:

- Colin Ward (baseball) (born 1960), Major League Baseball pitcher
- Colin Ward (ice hockey) (born 1970), hockey player
- Colin Ward (rugby league) (born 1971), Australian Rugby league player
