= Paxton Schulte =

Canadian ice hockey player (born 1972)

- Born: July 16, 1972 (age 53) Onoway, Alberta, Canada
- Height: 6 ft 2 in (188 cm)
- Weight: 210 lb (95 kg; 15 st 0 lb)
- Position: Left wing
- Shot: Left
- Played for: NHL; Quebec Nordiques; Calgary Flames; IHSL/EIHL; Bracknell Bees; Belfast Giants
- NHL draft: 124th overall, 1992; Quebec Nordiques
- Playing career: 1993–2006

Paxton James Schulte (born July 16, 1972) is a Canadian former professional ice hockey player.

Schulte was drafted 124th overall in the 1992 NHL entry draft by the Quebec Nordiques and played one game for the team during the 1993–94 NHL season, spending much of his tenure in the American Hockey League with the Cornwall Aces. He was traded to the Calgary Flames for Vesa Viitakoski in 1996 and again played mostly in the AHL with the Saint John Flames. He did manage to play a second NHL game for Calgary in 1996–97.

He moved to the United Kingdom in 1998, signing for the Bracknell Bees, winning the British Ice Hockey Superleague title in 2000. He then moved to the Belfast Giants for the 2000/2001 season and made a huge reputation with the team, winning the Superleague title in 2002 and the Playoff Championship in 2003 and gained a huge following with Giants fans for his toughness on the ice, but more so for his huge heart and presence off the ice. He returned to America in 2005, playing in the Central Hockey League for the Amarillo Gorillas and the Tulsa Oilers.

He retired in 2006 and is currently spending time on his father's Beef and Buffalo farm in Onoway, Alberta, near Edmonton. He has 2 sons and a daughter.

Schulte returned to Belfast to play in a testimonial game for his friend and former Giants teammate, Todd Kelman on March 13, 2007. His number 27 jersey was retired on March 9, 2007, before the Giants' game against Newcastle Vipers.

== Career statistics ==
=== Regular season and playoffs ===
			Regular season					Playoffs
Season	Team	League	GP	G	A	Pts	PIM	GP	G	A	Pts	PIM
1989–90	Sherwood Park Crusaders	AJHL	56	28	38	66	151	—	—	—	—	—
1990–91	University of North Dakota	WCHA	38	2	4	6	32	—	—	—	—	—
1991–92	Spokane Chiefs	WHL	70	42	42	84	172	10	2	8	10	48
1992–93	Spokane Chiefs	WHL	45	38	35	73	142	10	5	6	11	12
1993–94	Quebec Nordiques	NHL	1	0	0	0	2	—	—	—	—	—
1993–94	Cornwall Aces	AHL	56	15	15	30	102	—	—	—	—	—
1994–95	Cornwall Aces	AHL	74	14	22	36	217	14	3	3	6	29
1995–96	Cornwall Aces	AHL	69	25	31	56	171	—	—	—	—	—
1995–96	Saint John Flames	AHL	14	4	5	9	25	14	4	7	11	40
1996–97	Calgary Flames	NHL	1	0	0	0	2	—	—	—	—	—
1996–97	Saint John Flames	AHL	71	14	23	37	274	4	2	0	2	35
1997–98	Las Vegas Thunder	IHL	10	0	1	1	32	4	0	0	0	4
1997–98	Saint John Flames	AHL	59	8	17	25	133	—	—	—	—	—
1998–99	Bracknell Bees	BISL	36	9	10	19	152	3	0	0	0	14
1999–00	Bracknell Bees	BISL	39	12	20	32	110	6	3	2	5	4
2000–01	Belfast Giants	BISL	48	17	16	33	163	6	0	1	1	26
2001–02	Belfast Giants	BISL	46	20	17	37	133	6	1	3	4	42
2002–03	Belfast Giants	BISL	26	13	11	24	107	18	7	9	16	48
2003–04	Belfast Giants	EIHL	54	21	31	52	352	4	0	2	2	66
2004–05	Stony Plain Eagles	ChHL	12	6	17	23	74	—	—	—	—	—
2005–06	Amarillo Gorillas	CHL	4	0	3	3	8	—	—	—	—	—
2005–06	Tulsa Oilers	CHL	42	6	15	21	113	—	—	—	—	—
2006–07	Stony Plain Eagles	ChHL	8	4	3	7	52	—	—	—	—	—
AHL totals			343	80	113	193	922	32	9	10	19	104
NHL totals			2	0	0	0	4	—	—	—	—	—
