= Todd Kelman =

Canadian ice hockey player

- Born: 5 January 1975 (age 51) Calgary, Alberta, Canada
- Height: 6 ft 1 in (185 cm)
- Weight: 195 lb (88 kg; 13 st 13 lb)
- Position: Defence
- Played for: Bracknell Bees; Belfast Giants
- NHL draft: 141st overall, 1993; St. Louis Blues
- Playing career: 1997–2008

Todd Kelman (born 5 January 1975) is a Canadian retired ice hockey defenceman who is currently the Managing Director of the Cardiff Devils of the Elite Ice Hockey League. He was an original member of the first Belfast Giants squad that played in the old Ice Hockey Superleague in the 2000–01 season. He won the Superleague title twice, once with the Giants in 2001–02 (a mere one season after the team was founded) and previously with the Bracknell Bees two seasons earlier in 1999–00. He also won the Superleague Playoff Championship and the Elite League with the Giants in 2002–03 and 2005–06 respectively.

During his tenure at the Giants, 'Killer' became a huge favourite amongst the fans for his offensive style of play that created goals for the Giants as well as his strong defensive style and solid penalty killing. In seven seasons he played 366 games, which at the time was more than any other player in Giants history. He also retired as the leading points scoring defenceman in Giants history with 67 goals and 122 assists for 189 points. At the end of the 2006–07 season, Kelman retired as a player to become the General Manager of the Belfast Giants.

In 7 seasons as the General Manager of the Belfast Giants, Kelman and the Giants won the Challenge Cup and British Knock Out Cup (both in the 2008/09 season), the Playoff Championship in 2010 and Elite League titles in 2011-12 & 2013-14.

In 2010, Kelman secured an exhibition game for the named "Belfast Giants Select" (featuring the best players from the Elite League), against the world-famous NHL side, the Boston Bruins. The game took place at the Odyssey Arena on 2 October 2010, with the Bruins securing a 5-1 victory.

Kelman was drafted 141st overall by the St. Louis Blues in the 1993 NHL entry draft, but never played a game having spent his career at college for Bowling Green State University before joining the Bracknell Bees in 1997.

== Career statistics ==
			Regular season					Playoffs
Season	Team	League	GP	G	A	Pts	PIM	GP	G	A	Pts	PIM
1992–93	Vernon Lakers	BCJHL	48	16	30	46	54	—	—	—	—	—
1993–94	Bowling Green University	NCAA	18	0	2	2	12	—	—	—	—	—
1994–95	Bowling Green University	NCAA	37	2	6	8	20	—	—	—	—	—
1995–96	Bowling Green University	NCAA	32	1	5	6	40	—	—	—	—	—
1996–97	Bowling Green University	NCAA	36	3	9	12	51	—	—	—	—	—
1997–98	Bracknell Bees	BISL	45	6	8	14	36	6	1	2	3	4
1998–99	Bracknell Bees	BISL	42	2	9	11	34	7	2	1	3	8
1999–00	Bracknell Bees	BISL	42	5	13	18	40	6	1	1	2	2
2000–01	Belfast Giants	BISL	48	6	6	12	58	6	0	0	0	4
2001–02	Belfast Giants	BISL	48	9	10	19	48	6	1	0	1	4
2002–03	Belfast Giants	BISL	32	2	5	7	32	16	0	6	6	16
2003–04	Belfast Giants	EIHL	56	14	36	50	46	4	1	0	1	2
2004–05	Belfast Giants	EIHL	24	6	6	12	8	8	0	2	2	2
2005–06	Belfast Giants	EIHL	44	13	19	32	52	7	1	2	3	10
2006–07	Belfast Giants	EIHL	54	12	26	38	80	3	0	0	0	6
2007–08	Belfast Giants	EIHL	12	1	5	6	64	—	—	—	—	—
BISL totals			257	30	51	81	248	47	5	10	15	38
