= Jason Bowen =

Jason Bowen may refer to:

- Jason Bowen (ice hockey) (born 1973), retired Canadian ice hockey player
- Jason Bowen (footballer) (born 1972), Welsh former footballer
