= Jeff Hoad =

Canadian-British ice hockey player

- Born: January 26, 1973 (age 52); Brandon, Manitoba, Canada
- Height: 5 ft 9 in (175 cm)
- Weight: 185 lb (84 kg; 13 st 3 lb)
- Position: Centre
- Shot: Right
- Played for: Erie Panthers; Toledo Storm; Springfield Falcons; Nottingham Panthers; Ayr Scottish Eagles; London Knights; Belfast Giants; EC Bad Tölz
- National team: Great Britain
- Playing career: 1994–2006

Jeff Hoad (born January 26, 1973) is a Canadian-British former professional ice hockey player. He played in the British Ice Hockey Superleague for the Nottingham Panthers, Ayr Scottish Eagles, London Knights and the Belfast Giants. He also played in the East Coast Hockey League for the Erie Panthers and Toledo Storm, the American Hockey League for the Springfield Falcons and the German 2nd Bundesliga for the EC Bad Tölz. He played for the Great Britain national ice hockey team in three World Championships. He is now a member of the Brandon, Manitoba Police Service.

== Career statistics ==
			Regular season					Playoffs
Season	Team	League	GP	G	A	Pts	PIM	GP	G	A	Pts	PIM
1989–90	Brandon Wheat Kings	WHL	11	4	1	5	4	—	—	—	—	—
1990–91	Brandon Wheat Kings	WHL	66	10	18	28	79	—	—	—	—	—
1991–92	Brandon Wheat Kings	WHL	72	14	20	34	146	—	—	—	—	—
1992–93	Brandon Wheat Kings	WHL	70	28	32	60	158	4	1	0	1	11
1993–94	Brandon Wheat Kings	WHL	5	2	3	5	0	—	—	—	—	—
1993–94	Tri-City Americans	WHL	2	2	1	3	4	—	—	—	—	—
1993–94	Moose Jaw Warriors	WHL	55	36	41	77	100	—	—	—	—	—
1994–95	Erie Panthers	ECHL	35	13	17	30	112	—	—	—	—	—
1994–95	Toledo Storm	ECHL	15	1	5	6	35	—	—	—	—	—
1994–95	Springfield Falcons	AHL	11	2	2	4	33	—	—	—	—	—
1995–96	Erie Panthers	ECHL	67	25	24	49	135	—	—	—	—	—
1996–97	Nottingham Panthers	BISL	40	14	12	26	54	8	3	2	5	33
1997–98	Ayr Scottish Eagles	BISL	28	5	13	18	22	1	0	0	0	0
1998–99	Ayr Scottish Eagles	BISL	42	10	11	21	44	6	2	4	6	6
1999–00	London Knights	BISL	41	16	18	34	28	8	2	3	5	12
2000–01	Belfast Giants	BISL	45	17	18	35	54	6	0	1	1	6
2001–02	Belfast Giants	BISL	46	16	23	39	50	6	4	3	7	0
2002–03	London Knights	BISL	32	8	11	19	38	18	4	11	15	18
2003–04	Tolzer Lowen	Germany2	48	23	25	48	56	—	—	—	—	—
2004–05	Tolzer Lowen	Germany2	52	26	27	53	60	—	—	—	—	—
2005–06	Tolzer Lowen	Germany2	49	22	23	45	62	—	—	—	—	—
BISL totals			274	86	106	192	290	53	15	24	39	75
