= George Awada =

American ice hockey player

- Born: June 2, 1975 (age 50) Mendota Heights, Minnesota, U.S.
- Height: 6 ft 1 in (185 cm)
- Weight: 209 lb (95 kg; 14 st 13 lb)
- Position: Right Wing
- Shot: Right
- Played for: Albany River Rats; Richmond Renegades; New Orleans Brass; Florida Everblades; Manchester Phoenix; Belfast Giants
- Playing career: 1998–2010; 2011–2012

George Awada (born June 2, 1975) is an American former professional ice hockey player who played in the American Hockey League (AHL), ECHL, and Elite Ice Hockey League (EIHL).

== Career ==
Awada's career began at junior level in the USHL, icing for the St. Paul Vulcans. Awada started well and in his first season as a Vulcan managed 38 points in 47 games. His points return would again improve for the following season, 1994–95, with 54 points in 42 games, well over a point a game average.

This potential was noticed and Awada moved into NCAA hockey the following year, playing for St. Cloud State University in his native Minnesota. Awada would stay in St. Cloud for four seasons despite only managing 13 points in his first two terms. This would change for the 1997–98 and 1998–99 seasons and Awada again found his point scoring touch. In his final season for St. Cloud, Awada would ice alongside future NHL player Tyler Arnason.

Awada's improvement in point scoring was noticed and he was chosen to play at AHL level for the Albany River Rats, where he would finish the 1998–99 season, featuring in 10 games and scoring 8 points. He was kept on for the following season, and became a first team regular, icing in 63 games and helping out with 16 points along the way. Despite establishing himself as a first team player, Awada moved to the lower ECHL standard for the 2000–01 season, and became a Richmond Renegades player. He would instantly establish himself as a regular, and in 72 regular season games scored 41 points, helping the Renegades into the post season.

Awada would start the 2001–02 season in Richmond, but after just two games moved to the New Orleans Brass, ECHL rivals of the Renegades. Awada's improvement would continue and it would prove to be his most productive season at ECHL level, comfortably breaking the 50 point barrier. Awada would again reach this milestone the following season, this time for the Florida Everblades.

Awada would choose to make a significant move in the summer of 2003, flying across the Atlantic to play for the Manchester Phoenix, a then newly established organisation playing in the EIHL, the highest standard of ice hockey in the U.K. Awada quickly became a key player for the Phoenix, and scored 48 points in 52 regular season games. Despite making the post-season, the Phoenix organisation would be dogged by financial troubles and would be suspended in the summer of 2004.

Despite this, Awada remained in the EIHL, signing for the Belfast Giants. Again he would become a fan favourite and a regular point scorer. Awada was eventually named club captain and lifted the EIHL league title in the 2005–06 season.

Awada remained as Giants captain until the 2009–10 season when injury forced him out for much of the season and was replaced by Colin Shields. Awada retired at the end of the 2009-10 season, though returned to the Giants during the 2011–12 season to provide injury cover and played 36 games before retiring for good at the conclusion of the season.

In September 2022, it was announced that Awada would return to the Giants as an assistant coach for the 2022-23 EIHL season.

== Career statistics ==
			Regular season					Playoffs				
Season	Team	League	GP	G	A	Pts	PIM	GP	G	A	Pts	PIM
1993–94	St. Paul Vulcans	USHL	47	19	19	38	71	-	-	-	-	-
1994–95	St. Paul Vulcans	USHL	42	20	34	54	51	-	-	-	-	-
1995–96	St. Cloud State University	NCAA	22	6	2	8	16	-	-	-	-	-
1996–97	St. Cloud State University	NCAA	35	3	2	5	26	-	-	-	-	-
1997–98	St. Cloud State University	NCAA	38	15	14	29	74	-	-	-	-	-
1998–99	St. Cloud State University	NCAA	39	14	16	30	38	-	-	-	-	-
1998–99	Albany River Rats	AHL	10	1	1	2	8	1	0	0	0	0
1999–00	Albany River Rats	AHL	63	8	8	16	29	4	0	0	0	0
2000–01	Richmond Renegades	ECHL	72	18	23	41	49	4	1	0	1	8
2001–02	Richmond Renegades	ECHL	2	0	1	1	0	-	-	-	-	-
2001–02	New Orleans Brass	ECHL	70	29	30	59	87	1	0	0	0	2
2002–03	Florida Everblades	ECHL	72	21	29	50	67	1	0	0	0	0
2003–04	Manchester Phoenix	EIHL	52	23	25	48	72	6	0	2	2	0
2004–05	Belfast Giants	EIHL	30	19	15	34	32	8	2	4	6	14
2005–06	Belfast Giants	EIHL	43	22	30	52	80	4	1	1	2	2
2006–07	Belfast Giants	EIHL	54	28	26	54	130	3	1	3	4	4
2007–08	Belfast Giants	EIHL	60	22	32	54	89	-	-	-	-	-
2008–09	Belfast Giants	EIHL	-	-	-	-		-	-	-	-	-
Career Totals			751	268	307	575	919	32	5	10	15	30

- League statistics only, not including cup competitions, correct to 22/07/08

Preceded by Initial Incumbent	Manchester Phoenix Club Captain; 2003–04	Succeeded by Scott Basiuk
