= Jason Ruff =

Canadian ice hockey player

- Born: 27 January 1970 (age 56) Kelowna, British Columbia, Canada
- Height: 6 ft 2 in (188 cm)
- Weight: 205 lb (93 kg; 14 st 9 lb)
- Position: Left wing
- Shot: Left
- Played for: St. Louis Blues; Tampa Bay Lightning
- NHL draft: 96th overall, 1990; St. Louis Blues
- Playing career: 1991–2007

Jason C. Ruff (born 27 January 1970) is a Canadian former professional ice hockey player.

== Career ==
Ruff was the third pick, 96th overall selection of the St. Louis Blues in the 1990 NHL entry draft. The following year, he was part of the WHL East First All-Star Team.

Ruff is a graduate of the Western Hockey League, where he spent four seasons as a member of the Lethbridge Hurricanes before joining the NHL with St. Louis Blues and later Tampa Bay Lightning.

Ruff has played for the Belfast Giants since the 2001–2002 season, with one year sojourns to Ingolstadt in the DEL (2002–2003) and Kansas City Outlaws (2004–2005). He was captain of the Giants in 2003–2004 and in the 2006–2007 season he was a Player/Assistant Coach.

Ruff retired from professional ice hockey and returned to Canada in 2007 to become assistant coach of the Lethbridge Hurricanes in the Western Hockey League.

== Career statistics ==
=== Regular season and playoffs ===
			Regular season					Playoffs
Season	Team	League	GP	G	A	Pts	PIM	GP	G	A	Pts	PIM
1987–88	Lethbridge Hurricanes	WHL	69	25	22	47	109	—	—	—	—	—
1988–89	Lethbridge Hurricanes	WHL	69	42	38	80	127	7	2	3	5	28
1989–90	Lethbridge Hurricanes	WHL	72	55	64	119	114	19	9	10	19	18
1990–91	Lethbridge Hurricanes	WHL	66	61	75	136	154	16	12	17	29	18
1990–91	Peoria Rivermen	IHL	—	—	—	—	—	5	0	0	0	2
1991–92	Peoria Rivermen	IHL	67	27	45	72	148	10	7	7	14	19
1992–93	Peoria Rivermen	IHL	40	22	21	43	81	—	—	—	—	—
1992–93	St. Louis Blues	NHL	7	2	1	3	8	—	—	—	—	—
1992–93	Atlanta Knights	IHL	26	11	14	25	90	7	2	1	3	26
1992–93	Tampa Bay Lightning	NHL	1	0	0	0	0	—	—	—	—	—
1993–94	Atlanta Knights	IHL	71	24	25	49	122	14	6	17	23	41
1993–94	Tampa Bay Lightning	NHL	6	1	2	3	2	—	—	—	—	—
1994–95	Atlanta Knights	IHL	64	42	34	76	161	3	3	1	4	10
1995–96	Atlanta Knights	IHL	59	39	33	72	135	2	0	0	0	16
1996–97	Quebec Rafales	IHL	80	35	50	85	93	9	8	5	13	10
1997–98	Quebec Rafales	IHL	54	21	24	45	77	—	—	—	—	—
1997–98	Cleveland Lumberjacks	IHL	6	2	3	5	9	10	6	6	12	4
1998–99	Cleveland Lumberjacks	IHL	44	13	27	40	57	—	—	—	—	—
1998–99	Houston Aeros	IHL	1	0	0	0	0	19	5	5	10	12
1999–00	Frankfurt Lions	DEL	47	19	24	43	71	4	1	0	1	2
2000–01	Frankfurt Lions	DEL	49	12	24	36	61	—	—	—	—	—
2001–02	Belfast Giants	BISL	42	17	31	48	48	6	1	5	6	38
2002–03	ERC Ingolstadt	DEL	23	0	8	8	32	—	—	—	—	—
2003–04	Belfast Giants	EIHL	53	35	51	86	134	5	1	3	4	4
2004–05	Kansas City Outlaws	UHL	66	29	51	80	81	—	—	—	—	—
2005–06	Belfast Giants	EIHL	25	10	17	27	39	—	—	—	—	—
2006–07	Belfast Giants	EIHL	54	30	35	65	52	3	1	0	1	2
NHL totals			14	3	3	6	10	—	—	—	—	—

== Awards ==
- WHL East First All-Star Team – 1991
