= Shane Johnson (ice hockey) =

- Born: January 1, 1974 (age 52) Brandon, Manitoba, Canada
- Height: 5 ft 10 in (178 cm)
- Weight: 188 lb (85 kg; 13 st 6 lb)
- Position: Defence
- Shot: Left
- Played for: Belfast Giants; Sheffield Steelers; Cardiff Devils
- National team: Canada and Great Britain
- Playing career: 1997–2010

Shane Johnson (born January 1, 1974, in Brandon, Manitoba) is a British retired ice hockey defenceman of Canadian origin.

== Playing career ==
Johnson spent four seasons at Boston University before spending a year with the Canadian National Ice Hockey Team. In 1998, Johnson moved to the United Kingdom's British Ice Hockey Superleague with the London Knights. He then moved to the Bracknell Bees and won the Superleague title with the team. Johnson then moved to the Belfast Giants in 2000 and became a huge fan favourite during a six-year spell which saw him win another Superleague title in 2002, the playoff cup in 2003 and the Elite League title in 2006 as well as becoming an all-star. In 2006, Johnson moved to the Sheffield Steelers, but midway through the season, Johnson signed with the Slough Jets. In 2007, Johnson returned to Sheffield for a brief spell and had another brief spell with the Cardiff Devils before he rejoined the Giants. Johnson retired at the end of the 2009–10 season. His number 4 jersey is retired by the Giants in his honour.

Johnson also played for the Great Britain national ice hockey team and is now a British citizen.

== Awards and honors ==
Award	Year
Hockey East All-Tournament Team	1997
