= Kenton Smith =

Canadian ice hockey player

- Born: September 10, 1979 (age 46) Edmonton, Alberta, Canada
- Height: 5 ft 11 in (180 cm)
- Weight: 181 lb (82 kg; 12 st 13 lb)
- Position: Defence
- Shot: Left
- Played for: Johnstown Chiefs; Detroit Vipers; Pensacola Ice Pilots; Springfield Falcons; Charlotte Checkers; Columbus Cottonmouths; Manchester Phoenix; HC Valpellice Bulldogs; Cardiff Devils; Braehead Clan; Swindon Wildcats
- Playing career: 1995–2016

Kenton Smith (born September 10, 1979) is a Canadian former professional ice hockey player.

== Playing career ==
Smith began playing at major junior level for the Calgary Hitmen of the Western Hockey League (WHL) in 1995–96. He competed for the Hitmen for five seasons, establishing himself as a cornerstone of the team during that time. In 1998–99, he recorded 19 goals to establish a single-season team record by a defenceman (surpassed by Paul Postma's 23 goals in 2008–09), en route to leading his team to a President's Cup as WHL champions in 1999. Smith played 386 games in total for the Hitmen, scoring 226 points and clocking 527 penalty minutes.

Smith began his professional career in 2000, splitting the season between the ill-fated Detroit Vipers of the International Hockey League (IHL) and the Johnstown Chiefs of the ECHL. In his 13-game spell with the Chiefs, Smith helped them into the post season, when he himself featured on four occasions. His brief but promising showing with the Chiefs ensured his return to the ECHL the following season, although for the Pensacola Ice Pilots.

Smith impressed for the Ice Pilots as well, and was rewarded with a call up to the American Hockey League (AHL) from the Springfield Falcons. He featured in 9 AHL games before returning to play at ECHL standard. For the 2002-03 season, Smith became a Charlotte Checkers player, and again showed his ability at ECHL level, scoring 22 points in 48 games. Despite this, Smith moved again during the off-season, this time signing for the Columbus Cottonmouths. He featured in every one of the Cottonmouths regular season fixtures, helping out with 24 points along the way.

In 2004, Smith chose to return to the Charlotte Checkers, the beginning of a long and successful spell for both player and organisation. The Checkers reached the post-season in all four seasons which Smith spent at the club, and the player himself managed to score 125 points in 282 games. Smith did not miss a single regular season Checkers game from the start of the 2005-06 season until his departure at the end of the 2007-08 term.

In the summer of 2008, Smith was introduced to his first taste of European hockey, opting to sign for the Elite Ice Hockey League (EIHL)'s Manchester Phoenix under head coach Tony Hand with the contract being announced on June 10, 2008. Smith has also been appointed as captain for the 2008–09 season. Under Smith's often inspiring leadership, the Phoenix reached both the Knock-Out and Challenge Cup finals for the first time in their history as well as once again competing in the play-offs. Despite the success brought to Manchester by the team, off-ice financial problems arose and in the summer of 2009, the organisation announced that it would compete in the English Premier Ice Hockey League for the 2009-10 season. As a direct result, the budget had to be dramatically reduced and therefore Smith, along with most of the senior squad, was released.

He then joined HC Valpellice Bulldogs along with Manchester team mate David-Alexandre Beauregard. After one season he returned to the UK with the Cardiff Devils along with his brother Mark. He remained for three seasons before moving to the Braehead Clan in 2013. In 2014, Smith moved to the English Premier Ice Hockey League and signed with the Swindon Wildcats. He was named player-assistant coach of the Wildcats for the 2015-16 season, but only made three appearances for the team during the season and he eventually retired at the end of the season.

== Career statistics ==
			Regular season					Playoffs				
Season	Team	League	GP	G	A	Pts	PIM	GP	G	A	Pts	PIM
1995-96	Calgary Hitmen	WHL	53	3	17	20	32	-	-	-	-	-
1996-97	Calgary Hitmen	WHL	72	7	26	33	63	-	-	-	-	-
1997-98	Calgary Hitmen	WHL	69	7	26	33	81	18	1	6	7	26
1998-99	Calgary Hitmen	WHL	69	19	35	54	138	21	1	14	15	34
1999-00	Calgary Hitmen	WHL	71	7	46	53	128	13	3	8	11	25
2000-01	Johnstown Chiefs	ECHL	13	0	3	3	12	4	0	1	1	2
2000-01	Detroit Vipers	IHL	59	1	3	4	24	-	-	-	-	-
2001-02	Springfield Falcons	AHL	9	0	1	1	2	-	-	-	-	-
2002-03	Charlotte Checkers	ECHL	48	2	20	22	28	-	-	-	-	-
2003-04	Columbus Cottonmouths	ECHL	72	9	15	24	58	-	-	-	-	-
2004-05	Charlotte Checkers	ECHL	66	9	19	28	71	13	3	2	5	14
2005-06	Charlotte Checkers	ECHL	72	10	27	37	133	3	0	2	2	0
2006-07	Charlotte Checkers	ECHL	72	6	23	29	82	5	0	4	4	6
2007-08	Charlotte Checkers	ECHL	72	8	23	31	80	3	0	0	0	2
2008-09	Manchester Phoenix	EIHL	67	9	38	47	74	2				
Career Totals			884	97	322	419	1006	82	8	37	45	109

Preceded by Scott Basiuk	Manchester Phoenix Club Captain; 2008-2009	Succeeded by Current Incumbent
