= Will Colbert =

Canadian ice hockey player (born 1985)

- Born: February 6, 1985 (age 40) Arnprior, ON, CAN
- Height: 6 ft 2 in (188 cm)
- Weight: 205 lb (93 kg; 14 st 9 lb)
- Position: Defence
- Shot: Left
- Played for: Tilburg Trappers (Eredivisie); Belfast Giants (EIHL); Gwinnett Gladiators (ECHL); Worcester Sharks (AHL); Kalamazoo Wings (ECHL); St. Francis Xavier Univ. (CIS); Ottawa 67's (OHL)
- NHL draft: 228th overall, 2003; Ottawa Senators; 183rd overall, 2005; San Jose Sharks
- Playing career: 2003–2014

Will Colbert (born February 6, 1985, in Arnprior, Ontario) is a Canadian former professional ice hockey player.

For the 2013–14 season he was signed by the Tilburg Trappers of Netherlands' Eredivisie league. Previously he played for the Belfast Giants in the Elite Ice Hockey League.

For the 2013-14 season, he was named the best defenseman in the Eredivisie.

== Career statistics ==
			Regular season					Playoffs
Season	Team	League	GP	G	A	Pts	PIM	GP	G	A	Pts	PIM
2001–02	Pembroke Lumber Kings	CJHL	52	2	6	8	34	—	—	—	—	—
2002–03	Ottawa 67's	OHL	56	1	6	7	23	23	1	5	6	7
2003–04	Ottawa 67's	OHL	55	3	19	22	28	7	0	4	4	0
2004–05	Ottawa 67's	OHL	68	6	26	32	65	21	3	8	11	8
2005–06	St. Francis Xavier University	AUS	28	3	8	11	10	—	—	—	—	—
2006–07	St. Francis Xavier University	AUS	27	2	8	10	28	8	0	5	5	16
2007–08	St. Francis Xavier University	AUS	28	2	13	15	22	3	0	1	1	6
2008–09	St. Francis Xavier University	AUS	26	5	12	17	24	2	0	0	0	0
2009–10	Kalamazoo Wings	ECHL	37	4	5	9	33	5	0	1	1	2
2009–10	Worcester Sharks	AHL	19	0	1	1	0	—	—	—	—	—
2010–11	Gwinnett Gladiators	ECHL	58	6	6	12	24	—	—	—	—	—
2010–11	Chicago Wolves	AHL	2	0	0	0	2	—	—	—	—	—
2011–12	Gwinnett Gladiators	ECHL	61	2	16	18	26	4	1	0	1	0
2012–13	Belfast Giants	GBR	33	4	10	14	12	—	—	—	—	—
2013–14	Tilburg Trappers	NED	35	7	11	18	16	11	1	0	1	0
ECHL totals			156	12	27	39	83	9	1	1	2	2
AHL totals			21	0	1	1	2	—	—	—	—	—
