= Scott Basiuk =

Canadian professional ice hockey player

- Born: August 4, 1980 (age 44); Prince Albert, Saskatchewan, Canada
- Height: 6 ft 3 in (191 cm)
- Weight: 210 lb (95 kg; 15 st 0 lb)
- Position: Defence
- Shot: Left
- team Former teams: Retired; South Carolina Stingrays; Portland Pirates; Dayton Bombers; Bakersfield Condors; Utah Grizzlies; Manchester Phoenix; Sheffield Steelers
- Playing career: 2004–2010

Scott Basiuk (/ˈbæsək/; born August 4, 1980) is a Canadian former professional ice hockey player.

== Playing career ==
Born in Prince Albert, Saskatchewan, Basiuk began his career in the year 2000, playing at college level for the Rensselaer Polytechnic Institute in Troy, New York. Basiuk spent four productive years at RPI, making 128 NCAA appearances along the way, scoring 23 goals and 36 assists for 59 points. His senior season was his best season scoring 11 goals and 15 assists for 26 points and was selected to the All-ECAC Second Team.

After his senior season at RPI he was invited and attended the Los Angeles Kings Development Camp and got invited back to their Rookie Camp in September where he had 3 assists in 4 games against the Mighty Ducks of Anaheim, Phoenix Coyotes and San Jose Sharks rookies. Following the lockout that season, Basiuk attended the AHL's Manchester Monarchs main camp and was released after the conclusion of the camp.

After the Monarchs camp he was signed by the South Carolina Stingrays of the ECHL, for whom he made 27 appearances, before a call up to the Portland Pirates, then affiliate team of the Washington Capitals who play in the NHL. Basiuk managed to play one game for the Pirates at the higher level before returning to the Stingrays. In January 2005 he was traded to the Dayton Bombers and played with them for the rest of the season.

Again Basiuk failed to settle well, and he started the following season with the Bakersfield Condors. Basiuk played well for the Condors, contributing more than a point every other game from defence and was selected to participate in the 2006 All-Star Game in Fresno, California. Despite this, he again failed to play an entire season for one team, being picked up by the Utah Grizzlies, where Basiuk finished the season with 4 goals and 26 assists for 30 points and featured in four play-off games, recording 1 assist against the eventual champions Alaska Aces.

Basiuk was again on the move in the off-season, this time further afield to Europe, where in the summer of 2006 he signed for the Manchester Phoenix, a team playing in the EIHL, the highest standard of club ice hockey in Britain. Basiuk proved to be a good acquisition by player/coach Tony Hand, who made Basiuk team captain. Scott made 60 appearances in his first season in Manchester. His solid defensive play combined with attacking instincts meant that Basiuk grabbed 21 points. This production, combined with his physical style saw Basiuk become a fan favourite amongst the Phoenix supporters. An excellent first season persuaded Hand to re-sign Basiuk and appoint him club captain once again. After a few games into the season, Basiuk was given further responsibilities as player/assistant coach.

Basiuk responded well, scoring 12 goals and adding 33 assists in 58 games as well as a goal and 3 assists in 2 playoff games against cross-Pennine rivals Sheffield Steelers. The Phoenix lost by one goal in the 2 game total goal series and were eliminated. An inconsistent, up and down season in Manchester led Tony Hand to bring only a few players back over the summer of 2008. Basiuk was not one of them. During that time Basiuk signed a contract in Sheffield to play hockey and go back to school to get his MBA from the University of Sheffield.

In his first season in Sheffield, Basiuk would prove to be a reliable and physical defenceman and his play helped the team to both the league and play off titles. Basiuk's contract was one of the first to be renewed by Steelers' head coach David Matsos in the summer of 2009.

== Career statistics ==
			Regular season					Playoffs				
Season	Team	League	GP	G	A	Pts	PIM	GP	G	A	Pts	PIM
2000–01	Rensselaer Polytechnic Institute	ECAC	28	3	5	8	41	—	—	—	—	—
2001–02	Rensselaer Polytechnic Institute	ECAC	33	3	8	11	41	—	—	—	—	—
2002–03	Rensselaer Polytechnic Institute	ECAC	29	6	8	14	22	—	—	—	—	—
2003–04	Rensselaer Polytechnic Institute	ECAC	38	11	15	26	34	—	—	—	—	—
2004–05	South Carolina Stingrays	ECHL	27	1	5	6	28	—	—	—	—	—
2004–05	Portland Pirates	AHL	1	0	0	0	0	—	—	—	—	—
2004–05	Dayton Bombers	ECHL	42	2	7	9	37	—	—	—	—	—
2005–06	Bakersfield Condors	ECHL	41	2	20	22	71	—	—	—	—	—
2005–06	Utah Grizzlies	ECHL	23	2	6	8	22	4	0	1	1	2
2006–07	Manchester Phoenix	EIHL	54	3	18	21	95	2	0	0	0	4
2007–08	Manchester Phoenix	EIHL	58	12	33	45	111	2	1	3	4	4
2008–09	Sheffield Steelers	EIHL	54	5	19	24	77	4	1	1	2	14
2009–10	Sheffield Steelers	EIHL	29	4	7	11	80	2	0	1	1	2
ECHL totals			133	7	38	45	158	—	—	—	—	—

== Awards and honors ==
Award	Year
All-ECAC Hockey Second Team	2003–04

Sporting positions
Preceded by George Awada	Manchester Phoenix Club Captain; 2006-08	Succeeded by Kenton Smith
