= 2019 Challenge Cup final (UK ice hockey) =

The 2019 Challenge Cup Final was the culmination of the 2018–19 Challenge Cup. The final was contested between Belfast Giants and Guildford Flames. The Giants were the cup holders and the Flames were in their first ever final at Elite League level.

After a scoreless first period it was the Giants who took the lead when Patrick Dwyer scored a powerplay goal assisted by Josh Roach & Kyle Baun at 20:33. The Flames equalised through Jamie Crooks with a bullet on the powerplay at 36:38. The third period was scoreless which sent the game into overtime with the score level at 1–1. Belfast won the game and retained the Challenge Cup when Jordan Smotherman scored with 69:30 on the clock.

== Path to the Finals ==
=== Belfast Giants ===
Date	Opponent	Venue	Result	Competition
Saturday 8 September 2018	Dundee Stars	Away	Won 4–2	Challenge Cup Group B
Sunday 9 September 2018	Fife Flyers	Away	Won 3–1	Challenge Cup Group B
Friday 14 September 2018	Dundee Stars	Home	Won 4–1	Challenge Cup Group B
Saturday 15 September 2018	Glasgow Clan	Home	Won 6–4	Challenge Cup Group B
Sunday 23 September 2018	Fife Flyers	Home	Lost 4–2	Challenge Cup Group B
Saturday 13 October 2018	Glasgow Clan	Away	Won 4–3	Challenge Cup Group B
Wednesday 28 November 2018	Dundee Stars	Away	Won 8–0	Challenge Cup Quarter-Final, First Leg
Tuesday 11 December 2018	Dundee Stars	Home	Won 4–2	Challenge Cup Quarter-Final, Second Leg
Tuesday 29 January 2019	Glasgow Clan	Away	Lost 2–1	Challenge Cup Semi-Final, First Leg
Thursday 14 February 2019	Glasgow Clan	Home	Won 6–3	Challenge Cup Semi-Final, Second Leg

=== Guildford Flames ===
Date	Opponent	Venue	Result	Competition
Saturday 8 September 2018	Coventry Blaze	Home	Won 2–1	Challenge Cup Group C
Sunday 9 September 2018	Coventry Blaze	Away	Lost 3–2	Challenge Cup Group C
Saturday 22 September 2018	Milton Keynes Lightning	Away	Won 8–2	Challenge Cup Group C
Saturday 29 September 2018	Cardiff Devils	Home	Lost 5–2	Challenge Cup Group C
Saturday 27 October 2018	Cardiff Devils	Away	Won 5–3	Challenge Cup Group C
Sunday 4 November 2018	Milton Keynes Lightning	Home	Won 5–2	Challenge Cup Group C
Wednesday 12 December 2018	Sheffield Steelers	Away	Tied 4–4	Challenge Cup Quarter-Final, First Leg
Wednesday 19 December 2018	Sheffield Steelers	Home	Won 5–4	Challenge Cup Quarter-Final, Second Leg
Wednesday 23 January 2019	Nottingham Panthers	Home	Won 5–2	Challenge Cup Semi-Final, First Leg
Thursday 14 February 2019	Nottingham Panthers	Away	Won 3–1	Challenge Cup Semi-Final, Second Leg
