= Kevin Riehl =

Canadian ice hockey player

- Born: March 11, 1971 (age 55) Leader, SK, CAN
- Height: 5 ft 7 in (170 cm)
- Weight: 155 lb (70 kg; 11 st 1 lb)
- Position: Centre
- Shot: Left
- Played for: Cincinnati Cyclones; Utica Devils; Birmingham Bulls; Albany River Rats; Raleigh IceCaps; Iserlohn Roosters; Alleghe; Bracknell Bees; Belfast Giants; Bakersfield Condors
- NHL draft: 231st overall, 1991; New Jersey Devils
- Playing career: 1992–2005

Kevin Riehl (born March 11, 1971, in Leader, Saskatchewan) is a Canadian retired ice hockey centre.

== Career ==
Riehl was drafted 231st overall by the New Jersey Devils in the 1991 NHL entry draft, but never managed to play in the NHL. Instead, he played in the International Hockey League for the Cincinnati Cyclones, the American Hockey League for the Utica Devils and Albany River Rats and the East Coast Hockey League for the Birmingham Bulls and the Raleigh IceCaps.

Beginning in 1995, Riehl played in Europe, beginning two years in Germany's 2nd Bundesliga for Iserlohner EC where he scored 168 points in 93 games including 85 goals. He then spent two seasons in Italy's Serie A before moving to the United Kingdom in 1999 where he joined the Bracknell Bees of the British Ice Hockey Superleague. He won the Superleague Championship in that season with the Bees and was named into the BISL First-All Star team.

He was then one of seven players to leave the Bees, alongside head coach Dave Whistle, to join the newly formed Belfast Giants in Northern Ireland. He spent three seasons with the Giants, winning his second Superleague title in 2002 in only the Giants' second season of operations, as well as the playoff championship in 2003. He returned to North America in the 2003-04 season, joining the Bakersfield Condors of the ECHL before playing once more in Italy, retiring from hockey in 2005.
