= 2000–01 Belfast Giants season =

Belfast Giants
Season 2000-01
League	Sekonda Superleague
Home Ice Rink	Odyssey Arena
League position	6th out of 9
Play-Offs	QF
Challenge Cup	SF

The 2000-01 season, was the Belfast Giants first season of Ice Hockey. They competed in the Sekonda Superleague and played home games at the Odyssey Arena in Belfast, Northern Ireland.

The Giants first took to the ice in the league in a game with the Nottingham Panthers, which they lost, 5–1, on 16 September 2000. Kory Karlander scored the Giants' first Superleague goal. The following evening the club secured its first-ever league win when they defeated the Bracknell Bees 6–5 in a penalty shoot-out. Not only did it turn out to be their only shoot-out success of the season but it was also their only win in Bracknell. The club would play the first 15 games of the season on the road before they finally had their opening home game on Saturday 2 December 2000 in front of a sell-out Odyssey Arena. The evening ended in a 2–1 victory for the visiting Ayr Scottish Eagles.

President Bill Clinton was the reason for Belfast's home game against Newcastle Jesters on 13 December 2000 being cancelled. It was postponed to accommodate the President who used the new Odyssey Arena, the largest public building in Belfast, to address the local citizenry.

== Schedule and results ==
=== Regular season ===
Date	Opponent	Venue	Result	Attendance	Goalscorers
Saturday 16 September 2000	Nottingham Panthers	Away	Lost 5-1	-	-
Sunday 17 September 2000	Bracknell Bees	Away	Won 6-5 (PSO)	-	-

== Player Awards ==
- Player Of The Year - Shane Johnson
- Player's Player Of The Year - Kory Karlander
- Coach's Player Of The Year - Todd Kelman
- Fans' Player Of The Year - Shane Johnson
- Harp Lager Award (goal scorer) - Rod Stevens
