= Anders Eriksson (ice hockey, born 1975) =

Swedish ice hockey player (born 1975)

- Born: 9 January 1975 (age 51) Bollnäs, Sweden
- Height: 6 ft 3 in (191 cm)
- Weight: 214 lb (97 kg; 15 st 4 lb)
- Position: Defence
- Shot: Left
- Played for: Modo Hockey; New York Rangers; Detroit Red Wings; Chicago Blackhawks; Florida Panthers; Toronto Maple Leafs; Columbus Blue Jackets; HV71; Metallurg Magnitogorsk; Calgary Flames; Phoenix Coyotes; Timrå IK
- National team: Sweden
- NHL draft: 22nd overall, 1993; Detroit Red Wings
- Playing career: 1992–2011

Anders Eriksson (born 9 January 1975) is a Swedish former professional ice hockey player who played in the National Hockey League (NHL). He has represented more NHL teams (8) than any other Swedish hockey players.

== Playing career ==
Eriksson was drafted 22nd overall in the 1993 NHL entry draft by the Detroit Red Wings.

In his National Hockey League career, Eriksson has played for the Detroit Red Wings, Chicago Blackhawks, Florida Panthers, Toronto Maple Leafs and Columbus Blue Jackets. He has also played for the St. John's Maple Leafs, Syracuse Crunch and Springfield Falcons of the AHL. In 1999 the Red Wings sent Eriksson and two first round draft picks to the Chicago Blackhawks for defenseman Chris Chelios.

After a two-year absence from the NHL, Eriksson re-signed with the Columbus Blue Jackets on 2 July 2006, for a one-year deal. After a season in Columbus, he then signed with the Calgary Flames. This would be Eriksson's second time signing with the Calgary Flames. He signed a contract in 2004, but never played due to the NHL lockout, but instead played for HV71 in the Swedish Elite League.

On 26 June 2008, Calgary placed him on waivers. After being placed on waivers again by Calgary during training camp and not being picked up he was sent to the Quad City Flames of the American Hockey League. He was recalled by the Flames for the beginning of the 2009 Stanley Cup playoffs, and appeared in their first game as well as game six.

Without an NHL club to start the 2009-10 season, Eriksson signed with the San Antonio Rampage of the AHL on 4 December 2009. After appearing in eight games with the Rampage, Anders was signed by the Rampage's NHL affiliate, the Phoenix Coyotes on 21 December 2009. Eriksson played his first game with the Coyotes the same day in a 5-2 victory over the Blue Jackets.

On 3 March 2010 Eriksson was traded from the Coyotes to the New York Rangers for Miika Wiikman and a 2011 7th round pick. After he was initially assigned to affiliate, the Hartford Wolf Pack, Anders was recalled and made his Rangers debut in a 3-2 loss against the Maple Leafs on 27 March 2010.

On 27 September 2010, Eriksson was invited to the New York Islanders' training camp on a tryout basis. He was released on 4 October 2010. In November 2010, he signed a short-term contract for Timrå IK of the Swedish Elitserien, and played a total of six games for them, before returning to Modo Hockey of the same league on 19 December 2010, the team he played for before his North American career began in 1995.

== Career statistics ==
=== Regular season and playoffs ===
			Regular season					Playoffs
Season	Team	League	GP	G	A	Pts	PIM	GP	G	A	Pts	PIM
1992–93	Modo Hockey	SWE U20	10	5	3	8	14	—	—	—	—	—
1992–93	Modo Hockey	SEL	20	0	2	2	2	1	0	0	0	0
1993–94	Modo Hockey	SWE U20	3	1	2	3	34	—	—	—	—	—
1993–94	Modo Hockey	SEL	38	2	8	10	42	11	0	0	0	0
1994–95	Modo Hockey	SEL	39	3	6	9	56	—	—	—	—	—
1995–96	Adirondack Red Wings	AHL	75	6	36	42	64	3	0	0	0	0
1995–96	Detroit Red Wings	NHL	1	0	0	0	2	3	0	0	0	0
1996–97	Adirondack Red Wings	AHL	44	3	25	28	36	4	0	1	1	4
1996–97	Detroit Red Wings	NHL	23	0	6	6	10	—	—	—	—	—
1997–98	Detroit Red Wings	NHL	66	7	14	21	32	18	0	5	5	16
1998–99	Detroit Red Wings	NHL	61	2	10	12	34	—	—	—	—	—
1998–99	Chicago Blackhawks	NHL	11	0	8	8	0	—	—	—	—	—
1999–2000	Chicago Blackhawks	NHL	73	3	25	28	20	—	—	—	—	—
2000–01	Chicago Blackhawks	NHL	13	2	3	5	2	—	—	—	—	—
2000–01	Florida Panthers	NHL	60	0	21	21	28	—	—	—	—	—
2001–02	Toronto Maple Leafs	NHL	34	0	2	2	12	10	0	0	0	0
2001–02	St. John's Maple Leafs	AHL	25	4	6	10	14	11	0	5	5	6
2002–03	Toronto Maple Leafs	NHL	4	0	0	0	0	—	—	—	—	—
2002–03	St. John's Maple Leafs	AHL	72	5	34	39	133	—	—	—	—	—
2003–04	Columbus Blue Jackets	NHL	66	7	20	27	18	—	—	—	—	—
2003–04	Syracuse Crunch	AHL	9	1	3	4	12	—	—	—	—	—
2004–05	HV71	SEL	32	1	9	10	54	—	—	—	—	—
2005–06	Springfield Falcons	AHL	12	1	8	9	10	—	—	—	—	—
2005–06	Metallurg Magnitogorsk	RSL	17	2	8	10	10	11	3	2	5	16
2006–07	Columbus Blue Jackets	NHL	79	0	23	23	46	—	—	—	—	—
2007–08	Calgary Flames	NHL	61	1	17	18	36	3	0	1	1	2
2008–09	Quad City Flames	AHL	64	4	45	49	60	—	—	—	—	—
2008–09	Calgary Flames	NHL	—	—	—	—	—	2	0	0	0	0
2009–10	Phoenix Coyotes	NHL	12	0	3	3	2	—	—	—	—	—
2009–10	New York Rangers	NHL	8	0	2	2	0	—	—	—	—	—
2010–11	Timrå IK	SEL	6	0	1	1	6	—	—	—	—	—
2010–11	Modo Hockey	SEL	25	2	10	12	46	—	—	—	—	—
SEL totals			160	8	36	44	206	12	0	0	0	0
AHL totals			319	25	163	188	335	18	0	6	6	10
NHL totals			572	22	154	176	242	36	0	6	6	18

=== International ===
Medal record

Representing Sweden

World Championships
Bronze medal – third place	1999 Oslo	

World Junior Championships
Silver medal – second place	1994 Ostrava	
Bronze medal – third place	1995 Red Deer	

Year	Team	Event	Result	GP	G	A	Pts	PIM
1993	Sweden	EJC	1st place, gold medalist(s)	6	2	1	3	14
1994	Sweden	WJC	2nd place, silver medalist(s)	7	1	3	4	10
1995	Sweden	WJC	3rd place, bronze medalist(s)	7	3	7	10	10
1999	Sweden	WC	3rd place, bronze medalist(s)	10	0	3	3	14
Junior totals				20	6	11	17	34
Senior totals				10	0	3	3	14

== Awards ==
- Named Best Defenseman at TV-pucken in 1990.
- Named to the World Junior Championships All Star Team in 1995.
- Named Swedish Rookie of the Year in 1995.
- Stanley Cup champion with Detroit Red Wings in 1998.
- Bronze medal at the World Championships in 1999.

Awards and achievements
Preceded by Curtis Bowen	Detroit Red Wings first-round draft pick 1993	Succeeded by Yan Golubovsky
