= Adam Keefe (ice hockey) =

Canadian ice hockey player

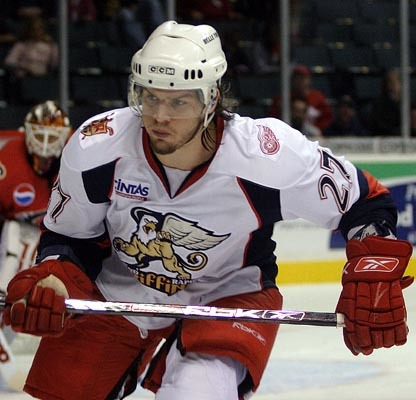
- Keefe with the Grand Rapids Griffins in 2007
- Born: April 26, 1984 (age 41) Brampton, Ontario, Canada
- Height: 5 ft 10 in (178 cm)
- Weight: 194 lb (88 kg; 13 st 12 lb)
- Position: Right wing
- Shot: Right
- Played for: Manitoba Moose; Grand Rapids Griffins; San Antonio Rampage; Belfast Giants
- Current EIHL coach: Belfast Giants
- NHL draft: Undrafted
- Playing career: 2005–2018

Adam Keefe (born April 26, 1984) is a Canadian former professional ice hockey forward who last played for, and captained, the Belfast Giants of the Elite Ice Hockey League (EIHL). Keefe announced his intention to retire from playing in 2017 and take up the position as Belfast Giants head coach, replacing Derrick Walser.

He appeared sporadically on the ice as injury cover during the 2017–18 EIHL season before retiring completely in 2018.

He is the younger brother of former Tampa Bay Lightning player and current head coach of the New Jersey Devils in the National Hockey League, Sheldon Keefe.

Keefe is also one of Pete Russell's assistant coaches within the Great Britain set-up, along with Corey Neilson.

== Career statistics ==
			Regular season					Playoffs
Season	Team	League	GP	G	A	Pts	PIM	GP	G	A	Pts	PIM
2000–01	Sudbury Wolves	OHL	50	4	10	14	62	8	0	0	0	2
2001–02	Sudbury Wolves	OHL	16	1	2	3	46	—	—	—	—	—
2001–02	Kitchener Rangers	OHL	49	0	2	2	208	3	0	0	0	14
2002–03	Kitchener Rangers	OHL	45	8	8	16	168	21	0	1	1	19
2003–04	Kitchener Rangers	OHL	67	18	20	38	205	5	1	3	4	12
2004–05	Kitchener Rangers	OHL	67	16	30	46	286	14	3	4	7	44
2005–06	Toledo Storm	ECHL	28	11	10	21	174	11	2	0	2	50
2005–06	Manitoba Moose	AHL	31	3	2	5	158	—	—	—	—	—
2006–07	Victoria Salmon Kings	ECHL	8	0	0	0	27	—	—	—	—	—
2006–07	Manitoba Moose	AHL	22	2	2	4	91	—	—	—	—	—
2006–07	Grand Rapids Griffins	AHL	16	0	3	3	97	—	—	—	—	—
2007–08	Grand Rapids Griffins	AHL	32	1	0	1	124	—	—	—	—	—
2007–08	San Antonio Rampage	AHL	34	1	0	1	121	1	0	0	0	0
2008–09	San Antonio Rampage	AHL	41	2	1	3	185	—	—	—	—	—
2009–10	Toledo Walleye	ECHL	24	2	4	6	107	4	4	0	4	19
2010–11	Toledo Walleye	ECHL	31	2	4	6	136	—	—	—	—	—
2010–11	Grand Rapids Griffins	AHL	40	3	3	6	97	—	—	—	—	—
2011–12	Belfast Giants	EIHL	57	13	18	31	230	1	0	0	0	17
2012–13	Belfast Giants	EIHL	54	11	11	22	235	4	0	1	1	6
2013–14	Belfast Giants	EIHL	52	12	10	22	158	3	0	0	0	0
2014–15	Belfast Giants	EIHL	56	10	21	31	147	4	3	2	5	2
2015–16	Belfast Giants	EIHL	52	4	8	12	147	2	0	0	0	2
2016–17	Belfast Giants	EIHL	43	1	5	6	145	3	0	0	0	2
2017–18	Belfast Giants	EIHL	4	0	0	0	4	—	—	—	—	—
AHL totals			216	12	11	23	873	1	0	0	0	0
