= Colin Shields =

Colin Shields MBE
- Born: 27 January 1980 (age 46) Glasgow, Scotland
- Height: 6 ft 0 in (183 cm)
- Weight: 189 lb (86 kg; 13 st 7 lb)
- Position: Centre
- Shot: Right
- Played for: EIHL; Belfast Giants; Newcastle Vipers; Sheffield Steelers; ECHL; Atlantic City Boardwalk Bullies; Greenville Grrrowl; Idaho Steelheads; Fresno Falcons; Ligue Magnus; Pingouins de Morzine-Avoriaz
- National team: Great Britain
- NHL draft: 195th overall, 2000; Philadelphia Flyers
- Playing career: 2004–2019

Colin Shields MBE (born 27 January 1980) is a former Scottish professional ice hockey forward who played most of his career in the United Kingdom's Elite Ice Hockey League (EIHL). He is the EIHL's all-time leading point scorer.

== Playing career ==
=== Amateur ===
Shields started his career in North America and played for Cleveland Jr. Barons in the NAHL for two seasons, 1998–2000. Shields was a sixth-round pick for the Philadelphia Flyers in the 2000 NHL entry draft. Shields opted to attend and play for the University of Maine for three seasons, finishing as the top scorer for the 2003–04 season.

=== Professional ===
For the 2004–05 season Shields was split between the San Diego Gulls, Atlantic City Boardwalk Bullies and Greenville Grrrowl of the ECHL, tallying 35 points in 62 games. For 2005–06, Shields moved back to his native United Kingdom for a spell with the Belfast Giants of the EIHL, where he played alongside former NHL star Theoren Fleury. 2006–07 saw a return to the ECHL, with 43 points in 57 games for the Fresno Falcons and Idaho Steelheads. Shields had a career year in 2007–08 for the Newcastle Vipers of the EIHL, scoring 73 points in 57 games. This led to a two-year contract with the Belfast Giants. Shields served as captain of the Giants, replacing George Awada, who was ruled out with injury.

On 7 April 2011, it was announced that Shields had left the Giants to sign for Morzine-Avoriaz in France.

On 22 March 2012, it was announced that Shields had signed to play the 2012–13 season for the Sheffield Steelers in the EIHL.

== Retirement and life after hockey ==
He announced his retirement effective from the end of the 2018–19 season on 26 March 2019.

In November 2021, Shields was inducted into the Ice Hockey UK Hall of Fame.

Ahead of the 2022-23 Elite League season, Shields was announced as a new addition to the Premier Sports broadcast team - alongside Aaron Murphy, Paul Adey and Angela Taylor.

Shields was appointed Member of the Order of the British Empire (MBE) in the 2023 Birthday Honours for services to ice hockey.

== Career statistics ==
=== Regular season and playoffs ===
			Regular season					Playoffs
Season	Team	League	GP	G	A	Pts	PIM	GP	G	A	Pts	PIM
1997–98	Kitchener Dutchmen	MWJHL
1998–99	Cleveland Jr. Barons	NAHL	55	30	30	60	44	—	—	—	—	—
1999–2000	Cleveland Jr. Barons	NAHL	55	46	49	95	40	3	1	3	4	2
2001–02	University of Maine	HE	42	29	17	46	39	—	—	—	—	—
2002–03	University of Maine	HE	34	14	13	27	18	—	—	—	—	—
2003–04	University of Maine	HE	44	18	26	44	40	—	—	—	—	—
2004–05	San Diego Gulls	ECHL	34	3	11	14	10	—	—	—	—	—
2004–05	Atlantic City Boardwalk Bullies	ECHL	19	6	12	18	4	—	—	—	—	—
2004–05	Greenville Grrrowl	ECHL	9	0	3	3	2	—	—	—	—	—
2005–06	Belfast Giants	EIHL	27	10	27	37	22	7	1	5	6	6
2006–07	Fresno Falcons	ECHL	24	7	7	14	22	—	—	—	—	—
2006–07	Idaho Steelheads	ECHL	33	9	20	29	10	—	—	—	—	—
2007–08	Newcastle Vipers	EIHL	47	30	31	61	18	3	1	3	4	4
2008–09	Belfast Giants	EIHL	54	29	41	70	12	2	1	1	2	0
2009–10	Belfast Giants	EIHL	56	34	63	97	65	4	1	4	5	0
2010–11	Belfast Giants	EIHL	54	18	48	66	34	3	0	1	1	0
2011–12	Pingouins de Morzine–Avoriaz	FRA	26	6	9	15	10	5	1	3	4	4
2012–13	Sheffield Steelers	EIHL	22	8	14	22	26	—	—	—	—	—
2012–13	Belfast Giants	EIHL	20	6	15	21	6	4	2	2	4	0
2013–14	Belfast Giants	EIHL	52	15	35	50	6	4	3	2	5	0
2014–15	Belfast Giants	EIHL	51	13	26	39	14	4	1	4	5	0
2015–16	Belfast Giants	EIHL	41	13	11	24	8	2	1	0	1	0
2016–17	Belfast Giants	EIHL	52	26	23	49	23	3	0	2	2	0
2017–18	Belfast Giants	EIHL	51	27	28	55	4	2	1	2	3	0
2018–19	Belfast Giants	EIHL	32	5	7	12	6	4	1	1	2	0
ECHL totals			119	25	53	78	48	—	—	—	—	—
EIHL totals			559	234	369	603	244	42	13	27	40	10

=== International ===
Year	Team	Event	GP	G	A	Pts	PIM
1997	Great Britain	WJC C	4	1	0	1	8
1998	Great Britain	WJC C
2000	Great Britain	WJC C	4	4	5	9	4
2001	Great Britain	WC D1	5	6	2	8	4
2002	Great Britain	WC D1	5	2	3	5	4
2003	Great Britain	WC D1	5	4	0	4	2
2004	Great Britain	WC D1	5	0	2	2	6
2005	Great Britain	WC D1	4	2	2	4	6
2006	Great Britain	WC D1	5	4	0	4	10
2009	Great Britain	OGQ	3	1	1	2	0
2009	Great Britain	WC D1	5	2	4	6	14
2010	Great Britain	WC D1	5	0	1	1	2
2011	Great Britain	WC D1	3	1	2	3	0
2012	Great Britain	WC D1A	5	3	5	8	0
2013	Great Britain	OGQ	6	1	5	6	6
2013	Great Britain	WC D1A	5	1	0	1	2
2014	Great Britain	WC D1B	5	5	1	6	0
2015	Great Britain	WC D1B	5	0	2	2	0
2016	Great Britain	OGQ	3	2	3	5	0
2016	Great Britain	WC D1B	5	3	1	4	4
2017	Great Britain	WC D1B	5	4	4	8	2
2018	Great Britain	WC D1A	5	1	2	3	0
2019	Great Britain	WC	6	0	0	0	4
Junior totals			8	5	5	10	12
Senior totals			95	42	40	82	66

== Awards and honours ==
Award	Year
All-Hockey East Rookie Team	2001–02
All-Hockey East Second Team	2003–04
AHCA East Second-Team All-American	2003–04
Hockey East All-Tournament Team	2004
