= Blair Riley =

Canadian ice hockey player

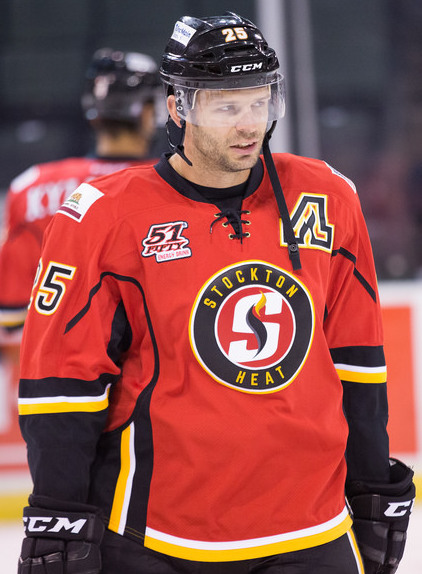
- Riley with the Stockton Heat
- Born: November 1, 1985 (age 40) Kamloops, British Columbia, Canada
- Height: 6 ft 0 in (183 cm)
- Weight: 209 lb (95 kg; 14 st 13 lb)
- Position: Left wing
- Shot: Left
- Played for: Springfield Falcons; San Antonio Rampage; Peoria Rivermen; Bridgeport Sound Tigers; St. John's IceCaps; Stockton Heat; Belfast Giants; Cardiff Devils
- NHL draft: Undrafted
- Playing career: 2010–2020

Blair Riley (born November 1, 1985) is a retired Canadian professional ice hockey forward who last played for the Cardiff Devils of the Elite Ice Hockey League (EIHL).

== Playing career ==
Riley attended Ferris State University where he played NCAA Division I college hockey with the Ferris State Bulldogs men's ice hockey team. Following his graduation, Riley turned professional to join the Springfield Falcons for three games at the end of their 2009–10 AHL season.

On June 1, 2012, Riley was signed to his first National Hockey League contract, agreeing to a one-year deal with the New York Islanders and reporting to their American Hockey League affiliate the Bridgeport Sound Tigers.

On July 16, 2013, after not tendered a new contract with the Islanders, Riley signed as a free agent to a one-year AHL contract with the St. John's IceCaps. He established an AHL career high with 21 points in 71 games before serving as an Alternate captain in his second season with the club in 2014–15.

As a free agent, Riley signed a one-year contract with his sixth AHL team the Stockton Heat, an affiliate of the Calgary Flames, on September 4, 2015.

After 7 seasons within the AHL, Riley left North America as a free agent to sign a one-year deal with Northern Irish EIHL participant, the Belfast Giants on August 8, 2016. On July 6, 2019, Riley signed for Belfast's league rivals Cardiff Devils.

On October 7, 2020, Riley announced his retirement from hockey after 10 professional seasons.

== Career statistics ==
			Regular season					Playoffs
Season	Team	League	GP	G	A	Pts	PIM	GP	G	A	Pts	PIM
2002–03	Merritt Centennials	BCHL	19	9	4	13	17	5	1	2	3	7
2003–04	Merritt Centennials	BCHL	60	22	42	64	214	5	2	0	2	10
2004–05	Merritt Centennials	BCHL	41	31	20	51	58	—	—	—	—	—
2004–05	Nanaimo Clippers	BCHL	20	10	6	16	33	13	6	9	15	45
2005–06	Nanaimo Clippers	BCHL	59	41	38	79	79	5	1	1	2	7
2006–07	Ferris State University	CCHA	34	3	6	9	44	—	—	—	—	—
2007–08	Ferris State University	CCHA	36	14	10	24	90	—	—	—	—	—
2008–09	Ferris State University	CCHA	37	7	9	16	70	—	—	—	—	—
2009–10	Ferris State University	CCHA	40	18	20	38	58	—	—	—	—	—
2009–10	Springfield Falcons	AHL	3	0	0	0	2	—	—	—	—	—
2010–11	Las Vegas Wranglers	ECHL	59	20	20	40	114	5	4	1	5	0
2010–11	San Antonio Rampage	AHL	4	1	0	1	0	—	—	—	—	—
2010–11	Peoria Rivermen	AHL	8	0	2	2	7	—	—	—	—	—
2011–12	Chicago Express	ECHL	15	7	9	16	8	—	—	—	—	—
2011–12	Bridgeport Sound Tigers	AHL	55	7	4	11	77	3	0	0	0	2
2012–13	Bridgeport Sound Tigers	AHL	74	7	8	15	165	—	—	—	—	—
2013–14	St. John's IceCaps	AHL	71	7	14	21	133	21	3	3	6	18
2014–15	St. John's IceCaps	AHL	70	8	10	18	116	—	—	—	—	—
2015–16	Stockton Heat	AHL	45	5	5	10	74	—	—	—	—	—
2016–17	Belfast Giants	EIHL	52	28	28	56	77	3	1	2	3	0
2017–18	Belfast Giants	EIHL	53	14	43	57	63	2	0	2	2	2
2018–19	Belfast Giants	EIHL	60	33	36	69	68	4	1	2	3	0
2019–20	Cardiff Devils	EIHL	40	18	13	31	63	—	—	—	—	—
AHL totals			330	35	43	78	574	24	3	3	6	20
