= Graeme Walton =

British ice hockey player

- Born: 14 June 1981 (age 43); Belfast, Northern Ireland
- Height: 6 ft 1 in (185 cm)
- Weight: 195 lb (88 kg; 13 st 13 lb)
- Position: Defence
- Shot: Right
- Played for: Belfast Giants (EIHL)
- National team: Great Britain
- Playing career: 2003–2013

Graeme Walton (born 14 June 1981 in Belfast, Northern Ireland) is a retired British professional ice hockey defenceman who played his entire career for the Belfast Giants of the Elite Ice Hockey League.

A stay-at-home defenceman, Walton trained locally at the Dundonald Ice Bowl where he impressed Giants scouts and was eventually given a contract in 2003. He went on remain with the team throughout his career until his retirement in 2013 and became one of the Giants' most consistent players. He played a total of 480 regular season games for the Giants and is currently the Giants' all-time leader in games played. The Giants have retired his number 18 jersey in his honour.

Walton also played internationally for the Great Britain national ice hockey team.
