= Derrick Walser =

Canadian ice hockey player and coach

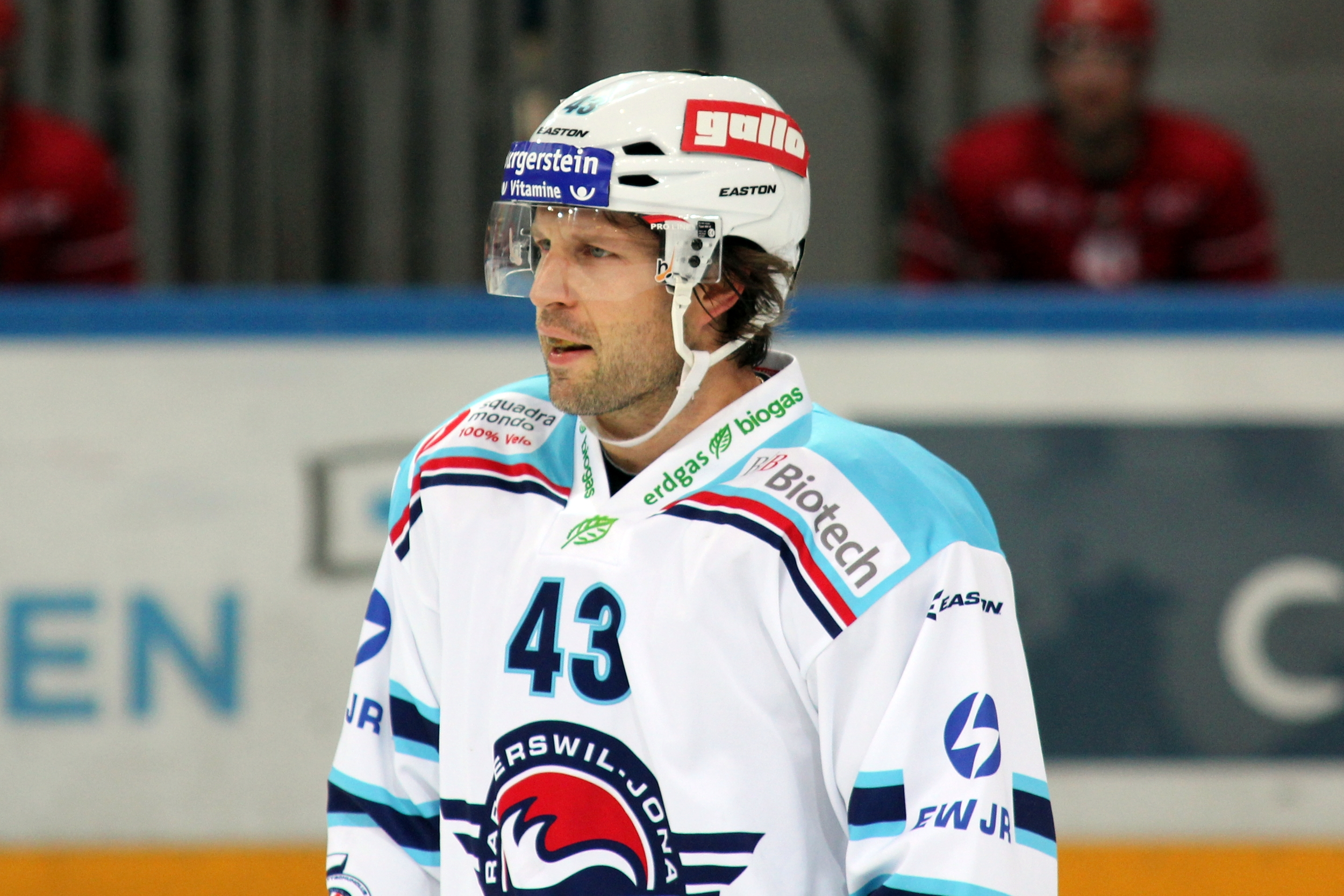
- Walser with the Rapperswil–Jona Lakers in 2014
- Born: May 12, 1978 (age 48) New Glasgow, Nova Scotia, Canada
- Height: 5 ft 10 in (178 cm)
- Weight: 194 lb (88 kg; 13 st 12 lb)
- Position: Defence
- Shot: Left
- Played for: Columbus Blue Jackets (NHL); Vityaz Chekhov (KHL); Eisbären Berlin (DEL); Rapperswil-Jona Lakers (NLA); Belfast Giants (EIHL)
- National team: Canada
- NHL draft: Undrafted
- Playing career: 1998–2017

Medal record

Ice hockey

Representing Canada

Spengler Cup
| Gold medal – first place | 2012 Davos | |

Derrick Walser (born May 12, 1978) is a Canadian former professional ice hockey defenceman. Most recently he was the head coach of the Red Deer Rebels of the Western Hockey League. Walser played 91 National Hockey League (NHL) games with the Columbus Blue Jackets.

== Career ==
Walser was signed as an undrafted free agent by the Calgary Flames on October 16, 1998. He was immediately assigned to Calgary's ECHL affiliate in Johnstown. Walser would spend parts of two seasons with the Johnstown Chiefs where he would score 25 goals and 38 goals in 73 games. Walser, along with teammate Joel Irving were named starters for the Eastern Conference in the 2000 ECHL All-Star game. Walser would spend the entire 2000-01 season in the AHL with the Saint John Flames.

Walser played 91 career NHL games, all with the Columbus Blue Jackets, scoring 8 goals and 21 assists for 29 points. He spent the 2004–05 and 2005–06 seasons with Eisbären Berlin of the Deutsche Eishockey Liga, winning back-to-back German championships, but would have his rights retained by the Blue Jackets. On June 30, 2005, the Blue Jackets sent Walser and their 2006 fourth-round selection to Carolina for a 2005 fourth round pick that had previously belonged to Toronto. Columbus would use the pick to draft enforcer Jared Boll. He would return to North America for the 2006–07 season to sign with the Carolina Hurricanes organization. Before playing a game with Carolina, he was traded back to Columbus for prospect Mark Flood, a former 2003 draft pick of the Montreal Canadiens. In 2007, Walser signed a contract with the Toronto Maple Leafs and played one season with the affiliate Toronto Marlies. After one season, he left the organization and signed with Chekhov Vityaz of the Kontinental Hockey League.

On June 5, 2009, he announced that he would be returning to his former club, Eisbären Berlin, where he would spend two more years. In his second year (2010–11), he was a key member of Berlin’s team who won the German championship and the European Trophy. Walser received DEL Defenseman of the Year honors that season.

Walser left Berlin at the end of the 2010-11 season, embarking on a four-year stint with the Rapperswil-Jona Lakers of the Swiss top-flight National League A (NLA). He played a total of 185 games for the Lakers, scoring 42 goals and assisting on 81 others.

On July 30, 2015 Walser was appointed player/coach of Belfast Giants of the Elite Ice Hockey League (EIHL). After two seasons with the team, Walser left Belfast at the end of the 2016-17 season; his departure was confirmed in April 2017. Walser has since become an assistant coach with the Peterborough Petes of the Ontario Hockey League.

== Family ==
His family consist of His wife sara walser having two kids Hudson and Camden walser

- His son Camden has recently been recognized for his own playing career following in his fathers footsteps. Winning top goaltender at the Canadian National championships (Telus Cup)

== Career statistics ==
| | | | Regular season | | | | | Playoffs |
| Season | Team | League | GP | G | A | Pts | PIM | GP | G | A | Pts | PIM |
|---|---|---|---|---|---|---|---|---|---|---|---|---|
| 1994–95 | Beauport Harfangs | QMJHL | 48 | 4 | 18 | 22 | 34 | 12 | 2 | 5 | 7 | 2 |
| 1995–96 | Beauport Harfangs | QMJHL | 69 | 9 | 31 | 40 | 56 | 20 | 2 | 11 | 13 | 16 |
| 1996–97 | Beauport Harfangs | QMJHL | 37 | 13 | 25 | 38 | 26 | — | — | — | — | — |
| 1996–97 | Rimouski Océanic | QMJHL | 31 | 15 | 30 | 45 | 44 | 4 | 2 | 2 | 4 | 6 |
| 1997–98 | Rimouski Océanic | QMJHL | 70 | 41 | 69 | 110 | 135 | 18 | 10 | 26 | 36 | 49 |
| 1998–99 | Saint John Flames | AHL | 40 | 3 | 7 | 10 | 24 | — | — | — | — | — |
| 1998–99 | Johnstown Chiefs | ECHL | 24 | 8 | 12 | 20 | 29 | — | — | — | — | — |
| 1999–2000 | Saint John Flames | AHL | 14 | 2 | 3 | 5 | 10 | — | — | — | — | — |
| 1999–2000 | Johnstown Chiefs | ECHL | 54 | 17 | 26 | 43 | 104 | 7 | 3 | 3 | 6 | 8 |
| 2000–01 | Saint John Flames | AHL | 76 | 19 | 36 | 55 | 36 | 19 | 7 | 9 | 16 | 14 |
| 2001–02 | Columbus Blue Jackets | NHL | 2 | 1 | 0 | 1 | 0 | — | — | — | — | — |
| 2001–02 | Syracuse Crunch | AHL | 73 | 23 | 38 | 61 | 70 | 10 | 1 | 5 | 6 | 12 |
| 2002–03 | Columbus Blue Jackets | NHL | 53 | 4 | 13 | 17 | 34 | — | — | — | — | — |
| 2002–03 | Syracuse Crunch | AHL | 28 | 7 | 14 | 21 | 30 | — | — | — | — | — |
| 2003–04 | Columbus Blue Jackets | NHL | 27 | 1 | 8 | 9 | 22 | — | — | — | — | — |
| 2003–04 | Syracuse Crunch | AHL | 48 | 10 | 26 | 36 | 82 | 3 | 1 | 1 | 2 | 4 |
| 2004–05 | Eisbären Berlin | DEL | 50 | 9 | 14 | 23 | 143 | 12 | 4 | 4 | 8 | 20 |
| 2005–06 | Eisbären Berlin | DEL | 48 | 19 | 24 | 43 | 120 | 11 | 6 | 1 | 7 | 20 |
| 2006–07 | Albany River Rats | AHL | 6 | 0 | 1 | 1 | 4 | — | — | — | — | — |
| 2006–07 | Columbus Blue Jackets | NHL | 9 | 2 | 0 | 2 | 0 | — | — | — | — | — |
| 2006–07 | Syracuse Crunch | AHL | 49 | 9 | 27 | 36 | 59 | — | — | — | — | — |
| 2007–08 | Toronto Marlies | AHL | 77 | 16 | 29 | 45 | 82 | 17 | 2 | 5 | 7 | 30 |
| 2008–09 | Vityaz Chekhov | KHL | 51 | 3 | 19 | 22 | 79 | — | — | — | — | — |
| 2009–10 | Eisbären Berlin | DEL | 51 | 5 | 30 | 35 | 48 | 5 | 0 | 2 | 2 | 2 |
| 2010–11 | Eisbären Berlin | DEL | 51 | 19 | 28 | 47 | 91 | 12 | 4 | 5 | 9 | 14 |
| 2011–12 | Rapperswil–Jona Lakers | NLA | 44 | 8 | 13 | 21 | 40 | — | — | — | — | — |
| 2012–13 | Rapperswil–Jona Lakers | NLA | 28 | 4 | 11 | 15 | 22 | — | — | — | — | — |
| 2013–14 | Rapperswil–Jona Lakers | NLA | 35 | 8 | 13 | 21 | 50 | — | — | — | — | — |
| 2014–15 | Rapperswil–Jona Lakers | NLA | 39 | 11 | 21 | 32 | 26 | — | — | — | — | — |
| 2015–16 | Belfast Giants | GBR | 43 | 6 | 32 | 38 | 69 | 2 | 0 | 0 | 0 | 2 |
| 2016–17 | Belfast Giants | GBR | 51 | 7 | 31 | 38 | 32 | 3 | 2 | 0 | 2 | 2 |
| AHL totals | | | 411 | 89 | 181 | 270 | 397 | 49 | 11 | 20 | 31 | 60 |
| NHL totals | | | 91 | 8 | 21 | 29 | 56 | — | — | — | — | — |
| DEL totals | | | 200 | 52 | 96 | 148 | 402 | 40 | 14 | 12 | 26 | 56 |
