= 2003–04 EIHL season =

- League: Elite Ice Hockey League
- Sport: Ice hockey
- Duration: September – March

Regular season
- Champions: Sheffield Steelers

Playoffs
- Champions: Sheffield Steelers

Challenge Cup
- Champions: Nottingham Panthers

EIHL seasons
- ← 2002–03 ISL season 2004–05 →

The 2003–04 Elite Ice Hockey League season was the inaugural season of the Elite League. The season ran from 12 September 2003 until 4 April 2004.

During the 2002–03 season, the financial collapse of the Manchester Storm and the Scottish Eagles, the resignation of the Bracknell Bees and the uncertainty surrounding the London Knights and their London Arena home left the Ice Hockey Superleague with little option but to fold.

The three remaining Superleague clubs, the Belfast Giants, Nottingham Panthers and Sheffield Steelers were joined by three British National League clubs, the Basingstoke Bison, Cardiff Devils and Coventry Blaze and two new clubs, the London Racers and Manchester Phoenix in establishing the Elite Ice Hockey League. The clubs hoped to provide a more financially sustainable league than its predecessor with a greater number of British trained players taking part.

The league was met with considerable opposition from the governing body, Ice Hockey UK who initially refused to affiliate itself with the new league, instead desiring that the remaining Superleague clubs integrate themselves into the British National League. This led to a bitter summer of uncertainty which only the intervention of the International Ice Hockey Federation ended. The IIHF ruled that the Elite League be granted a single season's affiliation with IHUK while discussions between IHUK, the EIHL and the BNL took place on the future of the sport in the United Kingdom.

The season began on 12 September 2003 with a game between the newly formed London Racers and the previous season's league champions, Sheffield Steelers. London began the season at Alexandra Palace but within a few weeks had relocated to the Lee Valley Ice Centre. The Racers went much of the season without winning, before finally claiming a 3–0 victory over Cardiff as the season drew to its close.

== Challenge Cup ==
During the early part of the season, the results from league games also counted towards a separate Challenge Cup table. After each team had played each other once at home and once away, the top four teams in the table qualified for the semi-finals.

Challenge Cup	GP	W	T	L	OTL	GF	GA	Pts
Belfast Giants	14	9	3	2	0	58	40	21
Sheffield Steelers	14	8	3	3	0	54	38	19
Cardiff Devils	14	8	1	5	0	39	38	17
Nottingham Panthers	14	6	4	4	0	37	32	16
Coventry Blaze	14	6	2	5	0	44	35	15
Basingstoke Bison	14	5	2	6	1	32	40	13
Manchester Phoenix	14	4	3	6	1	31	33	12
London Racers	14	0	1	13	0	23	60	1

=== Semi-finals ===
1st (Belfast) vs 4th (Nottingham)

- Belfast Giants 2–4 Nottingham Panthers
- Nottingham Panthers 7–3 Belfast Giants (Nottingham win 11–5 on aggregate)

2nd (Sheffield) vs 3rd (Cardiff)

- Cardiff Devils 1–3 Sheffield Steelers
- Sheffield Steelers 1–1 Cardiff Devils (Sheffield win 4–2 on aggregate)

=== Final ===
The final brought Nottingham and Sheffield head-to-head in a major final for the seventh time. The Steelers had won each of the last six finals in a run stretching back to 1995 and were clear favourites to win a seventh straight final against their bitter rivals after convincingly winning the Elite League title.

After a tight 1–1 draw at the National Ice Centre, the two clubs met in the second leg at Sheffield Arena on 17 March. The Panthers stormed into an early 2–0 lead before the Steelers fought back to tie the game at 2–2. Regulation time ended level and so the game went into overtime. After 53 seconds, Kim Ahlroos won the game for Nottingham, ending an eight-year wait for the club to defeat their rivals in a showpiece event.

First Leg

- Nottingham Panthers 1–1 Sheffield Steelers

Second Leg

- Sheffield Steelers 2–3 Nottingham Panthers (after overtime, Nottingham win 4–3 on aggregate)

== Elite League Table ==
Regular season standings	GP	W	T	L	OTL	GF	GA	Pts
Sheffield Steelers	56	44	3	8	1	214	109	92
Nottingham Panthers	56	34	6	14	2	209	158	76
Coventry Blaze	56	29	7	20	0	185	156	65
Belfast Giants	56	27	7	21	1	218	185	62
Cardiff Devils	56	23	6	24	3	155	162	55
Manchester Phoenix	56	22	8	25	1	140	155	53
Basingstoke Bison	56	20	5	28	3	146	195	48
London Racers	56	3	2	49	2	106	253	10

Each team played four home games and four away games against each of their opponents. Sheffield and Nottingham fought it out for the inaugural Elite League title before the Steelers pulled away to become comfortable champions, thanks to twenty consecutive wins, including 7–3, 5–0, 3–0 and 7–4 victories over the Panthers.

Nottingham finished runner-up while Coventry were the most successful former BNL side, finishing third. Belfast began the season strongly before a poor run of results in the second half of the season saw them slip to fourth place. Struggling London were always destined to finish last, doing so by thirty-eight points, while Basingstoke also missed out on a place in the playoffs.

== Elite League Play Offs ==
The top six teams qualified for the playoffs. Group A consisted of Sheffield, Belfast and Manchester while Group B consisted of Nottingham, Coventry and Cardiff. The Phoenix chose to stage one of its home games, against the Steelers at the 1,500 capacity IceSheffield rather than play the substantial costs involved in hiring the MEN Arena.

=== Group A ===
Group A	GP	W	T	L	OTL	GF	GA	Pts
Sheffield Steelers	4	2	2	0	0	11	5	6
Manchester Phoenix	4	2	1	1	0	5	6	5
Belfast Giants	4	0	2	2	0	5	8	2

=== Group B ===
Group B	GP	W	T	L	OTL	GF	GA	Pts
Nottingham Panthers	4	3	0	1	0	12	6	6
Cardiff Devils	4	3	0	1	0	12	8	6
Coventry Blaze	4	0	0	4	0	10	20	0

=== Semi-finals ===
The finals weekend took place over the weekend of 3–4 April at the National Ice Centre in Nottingham.

Winner A vs Runner-Up B

- Sheffield Steelers 2–0 Cardiff Devils

Winner B vs Runner-Up A

- Nottingham Panthers 6–1 Manchester Phoenix

=== Final ===
Winner A vs Winner B

- Sheffield Steelers 2–1 Nottingham Panthers

The final saw the two main protagonists of the season come head-to-head in a repeat of the title race and Challenge Cup final. The Steelers avenged their overtime loss in the Cup a few weeks earlier by beating the Panthers 2–1 before a capacity crowd at the NIC. Sheffield marched into a 2–0 lead before Nottingham pulled a goal back on a 5 on 3 powerplay. The Panthers never seriously threatened Sheffield's goal and in the end the Steelers were comfortable winners.

== Awards ==
- Coach of the Year Trophy – Mike Blaisdell, Sheffield Steelers
- Player of the Year Trophy – Jason Ruff, Belfast Giants
- Alan Weeks Trophy – Leigh Jamieson, Belfast Giants
- Best British Forward – Ashley Tait, Coventry Blaze
- Vic Batchelder Memorial Award – Leigh Jamieson, Belfast Giants

=== All Star teams ===
First team	Position	Second Team
Curtis Cruickshank, Basingstoke Bison	G	Jayme Platt, Manchester Phoenix
Dion Darling, Sheffield Steelers	D	Jeff Burgoyne, Cardiff Devils
Kevin Bolibruck, Sheffield Steelers	D	Steve O'Brien, Coventry Blaze
Jason Ruff, Belfast Giants	F	Steve Gallace, Coventry Blaze
John Craighead, Nottingham Panthers	F	Mark Cadotte, Nottingham Panthers
Mark Dutiaume, Sheffield Steelers	F	Erik Anderson, Sheffield Steelers

== Scoring leaders ==
The scoring leaders are taken from all league games.

- Most points: 88 Mark Dutiaume, Sheffield Steelers
- Most goals: 39 John Craighead, Nottingham Panthers
- Most assists: 54 Mark Dutiaume, Sheffield Steelers
- Most PIMs: 352 Paxton Schulte, Belfast Giants

Preceded by 2002–03 ISL season	EIHL seasons	Succeeded by 2004–05 EIHL season
