= Belfast Giants =

Ice hockey club in Belfast, Northern Ireland

- City: Belfast, Northern Ireland
- League: Elite Ice Hockey League
- Founded: 2000
- Home arena: The O2 Belfast (capacity: 8,700)
- Colours: Teal, red, black, gold, white
- Owner: Odyssey Trust Ltd.
- Head coach: Adam Keefe
- Captain: David Goodwin
- Website: www.belfastgiants.com
| Home colours | Away colours | Third colours |

Franchise history
- 2000–present: Belfast Giants

Championships
- Regular season titles: (9) 2001–02, 2005–06, 2011–12, 2013–14, 2018–19, 2021–22, 2022–23, 2024–25, 2025-26
- Playoff championships: (3) 2002–03, 2009–10, 2022–23
- Knockout Cups: (1) 2008–09
- Challenge Cups: (6) 2008–09, 2017–18, 2018–19, 2021–22, 2022–23, 2024–25

The Belfast Giants (Note: Known officially as the O2 Belfast Giants due to sponsorship.) are a professional ice hockey team based in Belfast, Northern Ireland. They compete in the UK's Elite Ice Hockey League (EIHL). They play their home games at the The O2 Belfast and are owned by the Odyssey Trust, a charitable company set up to hold and maintain The O2 Belfast and its facilities. The Giants operated as the anchor tenant for the Arena at its opening before becoming an integrated part of the organisation.

Since their inception in 2000, the Giants have won nineteen major honours, including nine British league championships (by finishing top of the regular season standings), three British national championships (by winning the post-season play-off tournament), and six Challenge Cups.

== History ==
=== Background and creation of franchise ===
The Belfast Giants Ltd. was founded in 1997 by two Canadian businessmen, Bob Zeller and his associate Albert Maasland, after Zeller was in talks with the British Ice Hockey Superleague (BISL) to launch a new franchise in the United Kingdom. The city of Belfast was chosen, with its new £92 million Millennium Commission project, the Odyssey Complex, due to be completed with the addition of a deal brokered between the Odyssey Trust and facility management company SMG to house the new hockey team in the arena. On 22 March 2000, the BISL confirmed that the Belfast Giants had been accepted into the league to begin play in September for the 2000–01 season.

In order to build a competitive roster for the new club, Bob Zeller approached Bracknell Bees championship-winning head coach Dave Whistle to become the first head coach of the Belfast Giants. Initially, Whistle was sceptical, deterred by having seen the violent footage of The Troubles on North American news media. In response, Zeller invited Whistle to visit Belfast and experience the changing city first-hand. Following his visit, Whistle agreed on a 3-year deal to coach the Giants. Whistle's roster recruitment began by looking toward his championship team in Bracknell, signing seven core players from that team to build upon in Belfast: Shane Johnson, Todd Kelman, Rob Stewart, Todd Goodwin, Kevin Riehl, Paxton Schulte, and Colin Ward. The captaincy was awarded to incumbent signing Jeff Hoad, with assistants Jason Bowen and Colin Ward.

The Giants formed in the immediate aftermath of the Good Friday Agreement. During the Troubles sports played a role in the sectarian divide among communities in Northern Ireland, but ice hockey was brand new and did not carry any historical affiliation with either side of the conflict. Giants CEO Robert Fitzpatrick said "Right from the start, the Giants was a place where everyone was welcome. I mean everyone: Protestants, Catholics, the LGTB community, it doesn't matter. Everyone is equal". In the years since the club's formation the Giants have provided a common interest for people to come together in a safe, family friendly environment.

=== Superleague era (2000–03) ===
==== Inaugural season ====
The beginning of the inaugural Giants season was marred with difficulties as the opening of the Odyssey Arena was delayed until early December 2000. This meant that the Giants were forced to play their first 15 games of the season on the road, without consistent ice-time for training or practice. Regardless, the Giants made their debut on 16 September 2000 against the Nottingham Panthers losing 5–1, with Kory Karlander scoring the club's first ever goal. The next evening, the Giants would travel to Bracknell in an unwelcome return for Whistle and his former Bees core. The Giants came out on top 6–5 after a shoot-out for their first ever win. However, the Giants would win only 4 out of 15 games to start the year.

Finally, the Giants played their first home game against the Ayr Scottish Eagles on 2 December 2000 to a sell-out crowd of 7,300 in what Whistle described as an "awesome spectacle" despite a 2–1 defeat. In the first period, Paxton Schulte would score the only goal for the Giants and fought Trevor Doyle shortly after, cementing his overnight status as a cult player for the hometown fans. The home ice proved to instigate a turn in fortune for the Giants mid-way through the season, playing in front of a consistently sold-out Odyssey Arena. The Giants would finish the season with a respectable 17–16–6–9 record, finishing in 6th place, and progressing into Group A of the playoffs to then be knocked out with a 3–3 record. The Giants saw more success in the Challenge Cup, finishing 1st in the group stage to progress to the two-leg semi-final against the Sheffield Steelers. The Giants won the first leg, 2–1, and lost the second leg, 7–0, for an 8–2 aggregate loss.

==== First Championship ====
Dave Whistle re-signed ten members of the original line-up for the Giants second season, adding only six to the new roster; defencemen Chad Allan and Terran Sandwith, forwards Curt Bowen, Dave Matsos and Jason Ruff, and Mike Bales in goal. Jeff Hoad, Jason Bowen, and Colin Ward would retain their roles as captain and assistant captains respectively, to be joined by Sandwith as a third assistant captain. The season began with an exhibition tournament, the BT Ice Cup, hosted by the Giants with invitations to the London Knights, Eisbären Berlin, and the Frankfurt Lions.

In their first league game, the Giants suffered a 9–3 defeat to the London Knights. This would be followed by a succession of sub-par performance on the road. By late September, Whistle decided to bring in centre Sean Berens to bolster the Giants offence. Berens' arrival and subsequent placement on the first line with Riehl and Ruff would prove a catalyst for the Giants' success to come. The Giants would go on a 9-game unbeaten streak shortly thereafter, which was broken by two losses, the first away in London and the second at home to the Nottingham Panthers on 16 October, which would be their last home defeat of the season. The Giants would then win 7–2 at home against Ayr to gain 1st place, where the team would remain for the rest of the season.

Following a 4–1 win at Sheffield on 17 January 2001, the Giants travelled to Bracknell needing only 1 point to win the league. On 19 January, in a poetic return to Bracknell for Whistle and his former Bees core, the Giants would force a 2–2 draw with the home side to clinch their first ever championship with a league record-breaking 16-game unbeaten streak. Upon their arrival back in Belfast, the Giants were welcomed at Belfast City Airport by over one thousand boisterous fans. Unfortunately the Giants would struggle with a championship hangover as the team botched come playoff time, not making it past the qualification group. The Giants would, however, advance to the Challenge Cup final for the first time in their history, only to be stifled 5–0 by the Scottish Eagles. That particular match became known amongst fans of the Belfast Giants at that time as 'Black Sunday' A reference to the jersey worn by the team during the match, introduced for the occasion of their inaugural Challenge cup as well as the day it was played on and the heavy defeat by a team that had suffered crushing losses to them during the regular season. Hockey fans who watched that game and also watched the Winter Olympics Men's Ice Hockey final later on/in the early hours of the next day would have seen Theo Fleury, a later Giants signing receive his gold medal as part of the winning team.

==== Playoff title and Superleague's demise ====
With the eventual demise of the Superleague in mid-2003, there were concerns that the Giants organisation would not survive because of developing financial issues. The club ran up debts of approximately £1.4 million, with Maasland saying that the Giants were "by far and away the worst business [he had] been involved in". One partner company was believed to be owed nearly £65,000. However, facing the threat of liquidation, creditors voted to accept a 20p-to-the-pound pay-out, allowing the club to continue under new ownership of local businessman Jim Gillespie and join the newly established first-tier of British ice hockey dubbed the Elite Ice Hockey League (EIHL).

=== Elite League era (2003–present) ===
The Belfast Giants have won seven EIHL regular season titles – the most recent of which came during the 2022–23 campaign, six Challenge Cup titles (including in 2017–18, 2018–19, 2021–22. 2022–23 and 2024–25), and two play-off championships.

Belfast Giants were added to EA Sports' NHL 20 game, enabling players to take control of the Giants in the Champions Hockey League.

The 2019–20 EIHL season was cancelled on 13 March 2020 with the remaining league fixtures and subsequent play-offs scrapped due to the coronavirus pandemic. The Challenge Cup was the only competition to see a winner crowned.

The 2020–21 Elite League season – originally pencilled in for a revised start date of 5 December – was suspended on 15 September 2020, because of ongoing uncertainty over coronavirus pandemic restrictions. The EIHL board determined that the season was non-viable without supporters being permitted to attend matches and unanimously agreed to a suspension. The season was cancelled completely in February 2021.

In March 2022, the Belfast Giants won their fourth Challenge Cup title after beating the Cardiff Devils 3–2 in overtime at the SSE Arena. The victory made head coach Adam Keefe the most successful in Giants history. The Giants then clinched the 2021–22 Elite League title in April, after a 2–1 shootout victory over the Sheffield Steelers. However they missed out on the treble after losing the 2022 EIHL play-off final 6–3 to the Cardiff Devils.

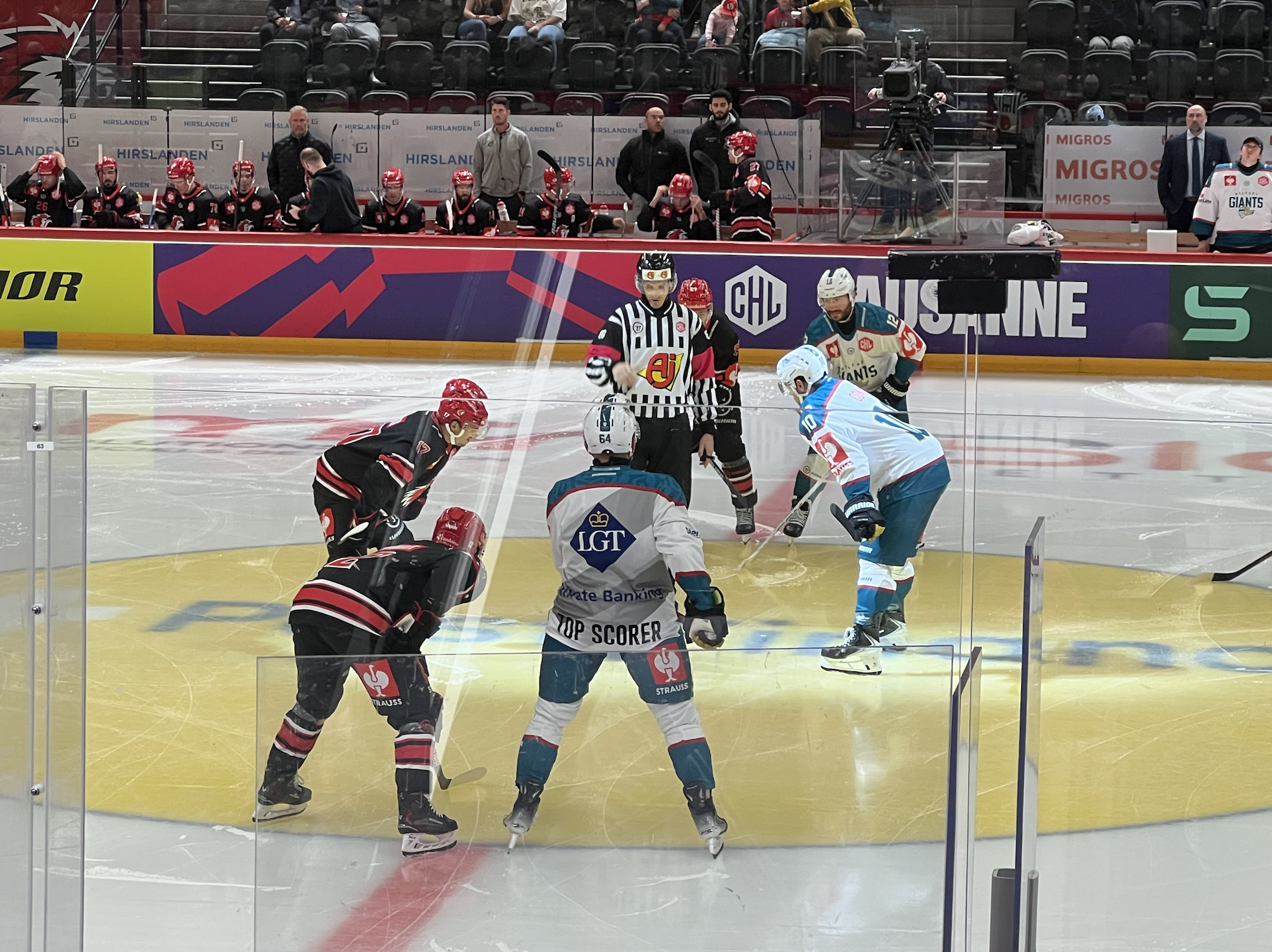
The Giants facing off against Lausanne Hockey Club in the Champions Hockey League on September 5, 2025.

=== Treble winners ===
The Belfast Giants won their fifth Challenge Cup in March 2023 following a 9–3 victory against the Fife Flyers in a sold out SSE Arena. The following month they clinched the 2022–23 Elite League title with a 6–1 victory against the Guildford Flames, thus making them the most successful team in the Elite League era as of 2023. They then completed the Elite League grand slam with a 4–1 victory over Cardiff in the play-off final – becoming the first team to win all three domestic trophies in the same season since Nottingham in 2013.

In the 2023/2024 Champions League Regular Season. The Giants would come agonisingly close to qualifing for the knockouts for the first time in club history finishing 17th meaning they would fail to qualify for the Round of 16 despite their 3 home wins over HC Bozen–Bolzano, EC Red Bull Salzburg and HC Dynamo Pardubice On the domestic side they failed to gain any momentum as they were eliminated from the Challenge Cup in the quarter-final by the Coventry Blaze They would end up finishing 3rd behind the Cardiff Devils and league champions Sheffield Steelers. In April 2024 The Giants would go on to face the Steelers in the 2024 EIHL Playoff Final but fell to a 3-1 defeat as the Sheffield Steelers completed their first Grand Slam in the EIHL era.

After a massive roster overhaul the following season the Belfast Giants would return to winning ways winning the Challenge Cup in March 2025 after defeating the Cardiff Devils 4-0 at The SSE Arena. Following a dramatic final day the Giants would take their 7th Elite League Championship following the Sheffield Steelers final day defeat to the Coventry Blaze. The treble appeared to be a step too far for the Giants as they would suffer a heavy 5-0 defeat to the Cardiff Devils in the Playoff semi-finals.

Head coach Adam Keefe, who played for the club with distinction from 2011 to 2017, had his former jersey #47 retired ahead of the 2025–26 season - recognising his achievements and commitment to the Giants both as a player and coach.

The Belfast Giants would secure yet another Elite League Championship following victory over the Nottingham Panthers in March 2026

== Team information ==
=== Logos and uniforms ===
Since 2000 the Giants' main logo has depicted a stylized version of the mythical warrior Finn McCool, who is commonly portrayed as a giant in popular folklore and has a close association with Ulster. The original logo had Finn brandishing a hockey stick with the Giants' wordmark in the foreground. The inaugural Giants uniforms featured white home jerseys with red and teal striping, matching socks, and black shorts. The inaugural away jerseys featured their now famous teal with red and white striping, matching socks, and black shorts.

For the 2001–02 season the Giants introduced red jerseys with teal and white striping for the BT Ice Cup, and black jerseys with teal and red striping for the Challenge Cup.

In 2002–03, the Giants altered their home jerseys to feature red shoulder piping with teal and black stripes.

For 2004–05 the Giants replaced the red shoulder piping with black piping on home jerseys and changed away jerseys to mirror these except with teal as the primary colour.

Ahead of the 2021–22 EIHL season, the Giants unveiled a refreshed primary logo and alteration to the club's home, away and Challenge Cup jerseys.

=== Arena ===
One corner of the SSE Arena has been dubbed 'Boomerang Corner' – named in memory of long time Giants fan, Stewart Boone – and was left unreserved for a large group of fans who generate noise, bang drums, and start game night chants until the 2022–23 season when these seats became bookable.

Originally there was a traditional four-sided scoreboard suspended over centre ice. This has recently been replaced by two large screens for scores and video replays; one behind Boomerang Corner and one at the opposite corner of the rink. Two traditional scoreboards are located in the two remaining corners.

=== Team culture ===
Sectarianism has long been a significant problem with sports in Northern Ireland. When the club was established, Giants' management was committed to ensure the club did not attach itself to any particular faith or community, instead aspiring to represent Belfast as a whole. A number of policies were introduced to achieve this. Football colours, clothing, and flags which may have displayed a person's political or religious affiliation were banned from the arena. The national anthem of the United Kingdom, traditionally played before games at other arenas in the Elite League, is not played before Giants games. The colours of the team, notably the dominant 'teal' used in both its logo and uniform, was chosen specifically because it had no national or political connotations in Northern Ireland.

These policies have been successful as the Giants have built a large and enthusiastic fanbase which has become known as the 'Teal Army'. As of the 2024–25 season, the Giants had averaged an attendance of 6,755, ranking them 2nd amongst UK ice hockey teams and 28th in Europe. This puts them well above the averages of teams in association football's NIFL Premiership, but well below teams that represent all of Northern Ireland (Northern Ireland national football team and Ulster Rugby).

The Giants have an official podcast, "A View From the Bridge", hosted by fans Patrick Smyth, Davy McGimpsey, Simon Kitchen, and Gareth Martin. There is also an official supporters club known as the Giants OSC.

=== Team songs ===
For many years, the Giants have been introduced onto the ice with the song "Rise" by English rock band The Cult. In recent years, "A Warrior's Call" by Danish band Volbeat has also been used as the team's entrance theme. Their goal song begins with The Irish Rovers' version of "The Belle of Belfast City", a popular local rendition of the old children's folk song "I'll Tell Me Ma". This is mixed into "Song 2" by English Britpop group Blur before face-off.

== Current squad ==
Squad for 2026–27 Elite League season

- * Denotes two-way deal with NIHL side Milton Keynes Lightning
- ** Denotes two-way deal with NIHL side Bristol Pitbulls

Netminders
| No. | Nat. | Player | Catches | Acquired | Place of Birth | Joined from | Press Release |
|---|---|---|---|---|---|---|---|
| 1 | (Canada) (United Kingdom) | Jackson Whistle | L | 2021 | Kelowna, Canada | Nottingham Panthers, EIHL |
| 35 | (Northern Ireland) | Andrew Dickson | L | 2011 | Ballymoney, Northern Ireland | Invicta Dynamos, ENL |
| 73 | (United States) | Jake Kupsky | L | 2026 | Waukesha, United States | Guildford Flames, EIHL |

Defencemen
| No. | Nat. | Player | Shoots | Acquired | Place of Birth | Joined from | Press Release |
|---|---|---|---|---|---|---|---|
| 2 | (Sweden) (United States) | Jaeden Martin | L | 2026 | Boynton Beach, United States | Odense Bulldogs, Metal Ligaen |
| 20 | (United States) | Christian Berger | L | 2026 | St. Louis, United States | Indy Fuel, ECHL |
| 22 | (United States) | Mason Klee | R | 2026 | Morrison, United States | Odense Bulldogs, Metal Ligaen |
| 23 | (United States) | Mike Lee | L | 2024 | Hamden, United States | HC Nové Zámky, Slovak Extraliga |
| 28 | (Northern Ireland) | Kell Beattie* | R | 2021 | Belfast, Northern Ireland | Solway Sharks, NIHL |
| 33 | (Denmark) | Morten Jensen | L | 2026 | Esbjerg, Denmark | Rungsted Seier Capital, Metal Ligaen |
| 55 | (Canada) | Ty Prefontaine | L | 2026 | Saskatoon, Canada | Allen Americans, ECHL |
| 58 | (Canada) (China) | Jason Fram | R | 2026 | Vancouver, Canada | Glasgow Clan, EIHL |
| 77 | (Canada) | Josh Roach | R | 2022 | Saskatoon, Canada | Kenaston Blizzards, SVHL |

Forwards
| No. | Nat. | Player | Position | Acquired | Place of Birth | Joined from | Press Release |
|---|---|---|---|---|---|---|---|
| 8 | (Canada) | Kaleb Pearson | RW/LW | 2026 | St. Marys, Canada | Idaho Steelheads, ECHL |
| 10 | (United Kingdom) (Canada) | Scott Conway A | C | 2024 | Basingstoke, England | HK Dukla Trenčín, Slovak Extraliga |
| 12 | (United States) | J.J. Piccinich | RW | 2024 | Paramus, United States | Stjernen Hockey, EHL |
| 14 | (United States) | Peter Bates | C/LW | 2026 | Evanston, United States | Wichita Thunder, ECHL |
| 24 | (Northern Ireland) | Carter Hamill* | C/LW | 2024 | Belfast, Northern Ireland | Milton Keynes Lightning, NIHL |
| 25 | (Northern Ireland) (Republic of Ireland) | Harvey Wooldridge** | C | 2026 | London, England | Connecticut RoughRiders, EHL |
| 29 | (Canada) | Jordan Kawaguchi A | C | 2024 | Abbotsford, Canada | Idaho Steelheads, ECHL |
| 63 | (Canada) | Jake Gaudet A | C | 2025 | Ottawa, Canada | Cleveland Monsters, AHL |
| 64 | (United States) | David Goodwin C | C/LW | 2025 | St Louis, United States | No Team |
| 72 | (England) | Cole Shudra | RW/D | 2026 | Rotherham, England | Sheffield Steelers, EIHL |
| 86 | (Northern Ireland) (Canada) | Mack Stewart* | RW/LW | 2026 | Belfast, Northern Ireland | Coventry Blaze, EIHL |
| 89 | (England) (United Kingdom) | Ciaran Long A | LW | 2021 | Birmingham, England | Manchester Storm, EIHL |
| 91 | (Canada) | Nicolas Guay | RW | 2025 | Châteauguay, Canada | Trois-Rivières Lions, ECHL |
| 92 | (United States) | Logan Cockerill | LW/RW | 2026 | Brighton, United States | Jacksonville Icemen, ECHL |
| 94 | (Canada) | Patrick Guay | C/LW | 2026 | Magog, Canada | Västerås IK, HockeyAllsvenskan |

Team Staff
| No. | Nat. | Name | Position | Place of Birth | Joined from | Press Release |
|---|---|---|---|---|---|---|
| N/A | (Canada) | Adam Keefe | Head coach | Brampton, Canada | Appointed in 2017 |
| N/A | (United States) | Jeff Mason | Associate coach | Easthampton, United States | Dundee Stars, EIHL |
| N/A | (Canada) (United Kingdom) | Rob Stewart | Assistant coach | Selkirk, Canada | Romford Raiders, EPIHL |
| N/A | (United States) (United Kingdom) | George Awada | Assistant coach | Saint Paul, United States | Appointed in 2022 |
| N/A | (Canada) (United Kingdom) | Steve Thornton | GM/Director of Hockey Operations | Edmonton, Canada | Basingstoke Bison, EIHL |
| N/A | (Wales) | Jason 'Taff' Ellery | Equipment Manager | Cardiff, Wales | London Knights, BISL |
| N/A | (Northern Ireland) | Barbara Reynolds | Massage Therapist | Northern Ireland | Appointed in 2016 |
| N/A | (Scotland) | Colin Shields | Performance Coach | Glasgow, Scotland | Appointed in 2026 |

Recent departures
| No. | | Player | Position | Acquired | Leaving For | Press Release |
|---|---|---|---|---|---|---|
| 3 | (United States) | Bo Hanson | L | 2024 | Retired |
| 7 | (Canada) | Reid Irwin | D | 2025 | Retired |
| 8 | (United States) | Ben Freeman | RW/C | 2026 | TBC |
| 9 | (Canada) (United Kingdom) | Ben Lake A | LW/C | 2021 | Retired |
| 17 | (England) | Rhodes Mitchell-King | L | 2024 | Telford Tigers, NIHL |
| 21 | (Canada) | Garrett McFadden | L | 2025 | TBC |
| 36 | (Canada) | Carsen Twarynski | LW/RW | 2025 | TBC |
| 42 | (Canada) | Gabe Bast | D | 2024 | Retired |
| 46 | (England) | Finley Howells | LW | 2024 | Telford Tigers, NIHL |
| 74 | (Canada) (United Kingdom) | Brandon Whistle | C | 2025 | Sheffield Steelers, EIHL |
| 88 | (United States) | Ryan Smith | C/RW | 2025 | Hannover Scorpions, Oberliga |

== Former Giants ==
=== Retired jersey numbers ===
- 4 Shane Johnson
- 11 Colin Ward
- 16 Rob Stewart
- 18 Graeme Walton
- 19 Colin Shields
- 27 Paxton Schulte
- 44 Todd Kelman
- 47 Adam Keefe

=== Notable former players ===
- 2 Brock Matheson
- 5 Will Colbert
- 5 Jérôme Gauthier-Leduc — former Buffalo Sabres draft pick, played for Belfast February–June 2017
- 12 Kyle Baun — ex AHLer
- 14 Theoren Fleury — former Stanley Cup-winning NHL player
- 14 Daymen Rycroft
- 14 Mike Forney — 2015–17; former Atlanta Thrashers draft pick
- 15 Scott Champagne
- 15 Kevin Westgarth — former Stanley Cup-winning NHL player
- 15 Darcy Murphy — 2018–19 top EIHL points scorer (79)
- 17 Gregory Stewart
- 19 Colin Shields — EIHL all-time top points scorer and ex-Philadelphia Flyers draft pick
- 23 Alex Foster – 2016–17; ex-Toronto Maple Leafs NHLer
- 23 Griffin Reinhart – 2021–22; ex-New York Islanders and Edmonton Oilers; 2012 NHL first-round draft pick
- 24 Noah Clarke
- 24 Jonathan Ferland — a one-time Montreal Canadiens draft pick
- 25 Blair Riley — 2016–19; ex-AHLer who also captained the Giants from 2017 to 2019
- 39 Patrick Dwyer — the ex-Carolina Hurricanes NHLer played for Belfast between 2018 and 2019 before retiring
- 43 Derrick Walser — former NHL defenceman and Belfast player/coach 2015–17
- 50 Matt Nickerson — former NHL draft pick, played for Belfast for two seasons – 2015–17
- 64 David Goodwin — captained Belfast from 2021 to 2023, leading the team to a domestic treble in 2022–23
- 83 Dustin Johner — a Florida Panthers draft pick in 2001
- 91 Nathan Robinson

=== Captains ===
| Name | Tenure |
|---|---|
| Jeff Hoad | 2000–02 |
| Paul Kruse | 2002–03 |
| Jason Ruff | 2003–04 |
| Shane Johnson | 2004–05 |
| George Awada | 2005–09 |
| Colin Shields | 2009–11 |
| Jeremy Rebek | 2011–12 |
| Adam Keefe | 2012–17 |
| Blair Riley | 2017–19 |
| Matt Pelech | 2019–20 |
| David Goodwin | 2021–23 |
| Mark Cooper | 2023–25 |
| David Goodwin | 2025– |

=== Head coaches ===
| No. | Name | Tenure |
|---|---|---|
| 1 | David Whistle | 2000–03 |
| 2 | Rob Stewart | 2003–04 |
| 3 | Tony Hand | 2004–05 |
| 4 | Ed Courtenay | 2005–08 |
| 5 | Steve Thornton | 2008–10 |
| 6 | Doug Christiansen | 2010–13 |
| 7 | Paul Adey | 2013–14 |
| 8 | Steve Thornton | 2014–15 |
| 9 | Derrick Walser | 2015–17 |
| 10 | Adam Keefe | 2017– present |

=== Franchise scoring leaders ===
These are the Top 10 Points Scoring Leaders for the Belfast Giants:

Note: GP = Games Played, G = Goals, A = Assists, Pts = Points

| Player | POS | GP | G | A | Pts |
|---|---|---|---|---|---|
| Colin Shields | C/RW | 370 | 159 | 297 | 456 |
| George Awada | RW | 376 | 149 | 187 | 336 |
| Craig Peacock | RW | 341 | 140 | 159 | 299 |
| Evan Cheverie | LW | 239 | 91 | 183 | 274 |
| Jason Ruff | LW | 193 | 100 | 145 | 245 |
| Todd Kelman | D | 418 | 73 | 141 | 214 |
| Shane Johnson | D | 491 | 54 | 145 | 199 |
| Rob Sandrock | D | 224 | 49 | 141 | 190 |
| Ed Courtenay | RW | 124 | 58 | 129 | 187 |
| Curtis Bowen | LW | 219 | 84 | 103 | 187 |

== Honours ==
2000–01

- ISL Second Team All-Star: Kory Karlander

2001–02

- Superleague Champions
- ISL First Team All-Star: Mike Bales, Rob Stewart, Kevin Riehl, Sean Berens, Jason Ruff

2002–03

- Superleague Playoff Champions
- ISL First Team All-Star: Robby Sandrock, Paxton Schulte
- ISL Second Team All-Star: Ryan Bach, Kevin Riehl

2003–04

- EIHL First Team All-Star: Jason Ruff

2004–05

- British Cross-League: 1st Place
- EIHL First Team All-Star: Tony Hand
- EIHL Second Team All-Star: Martin Klempa and George Awada

2005–06

- Elite League Champions
- EIHL First Team All-Star: Theo Fleury and Ed Courtenay
- EIHL Second Team All-Star: Mike Minard, Todd Kelman and George Awada
- Vic Batchelder Memorial Trophy: Nathan Craze

2008–09

- EIHL Challenge Cup Champions
- EIHL Knock Out Cup Champions
- EIHL First Team All-Star: Paul Deniset

2009–10

- EIHL Play-off Champions
- EIHL First Team All-Star: Stephen Murphy and Colin Shields
- EIHL Second Team All-Star: Michael Jacobsen and Jeff Szwez

2010–11

- EIHL First Team All-Star: Jon Gleed
- EIHL Second Team All-Star: Stephen Murphy

2011–12

- Elite League Champions
- EIHL First Team All-Star: Stephen Murphy and Jeff Mason
- EIHL Second Team All-Star: Jeremy Rebek and Robert Dowd

2012–13

- Erhardt Conference Winners
- EIHL Second Team All-Star: Robbie Sandrock

2013–14

- Elite League Champions
- Erhardt Conference Winners
- EIHL First Team All-Star: Rob Sandrock, Calvin Elfring and Kevin Saurette
- EIHL Second Team All-Star: Stephen Murphy, Jeff Szwez and Evan Cheverie

2015–16

- EIHL Second Team All-Star: Derrick Walser, James Desmarais

2016–17

- EIHL First Team All-Star: Jim Vandermeer
- EIHL Second Team All-Star: Derrick Walser, Blair Riley

2017–18

- EIHL Challenge Cup Champions
- EIHL First Team All-Star: Sébastien Sylvestre

2018–19

- Elite League Champions
- EIHL Challenge Cup Champions
- Erhardt Conference Winners
- EIHL First Team All-Star: Tyler Beskorowany, Josh Roach, Darcy Murphy
- EIHL Second Team All-Star: Kyle Baun, Patrick Dwyer

2021–22

- EIHL Challenge Cup Champions
- Elite League Champions
- EIHL First Team All-Star: Tyler Beskorowany, Griffin Reinhart, J.J. Piccinich, Scott Conway

2022–23

- EIHL Challenge Cup Champions
- Elite League Champions
- EIHL Play-off Champions
- EIHL First Team All-Star: Tyler Beskorowany, Gabe Bast, Scott Conway, David Goodwin

2024–25

- EIHL Challenge Cup Champions
- Elite League Champions
- EIHL First Team All-Star: Josh Roach
- EIHL Second Team All-Star: Gabe Bast, Scott Conway

2025–26

- Elite League Champions
- EIHL First Team All-Star: J.J. Piccinich, Mike Lee
- EIHL Second Team All-Star: Jordan Kawaguchi

== Notes ==
| Preceded by Sheffield Steelers | Superleague Champions; 2001–02 | Succeeded by Sheffield Steelers |
| Preceded by Sheffield Steelers | Playoff Champions; 2002–03 | Succeeded by Sheffield Steelers |
| Preceded by Coventry Blaze | Elite League Champions; 2005–06 | Succeeded by Coventry Blaze |
| Preceded by Nottingham Panthers | Challenge Cup Winners; 2008–09 | Succeeded by Nottingham Panthers |
| Preceded by Coventry Blaze | Knockout Cup Winners; 2008–09 | Succeeded by Last Winners |
| Preceded by Sheffield Steelers | Playoff Champions; 2009–10 | Succeeded by Nottingham Panthers |
| Preceded by Sheffield Steelers | Elite League Champions; 2011–12 | Succeeded by Nottingham Panthers |
| Preceded by Inaugural winners | Erhardt Conference Winners; 2012–13, 2013–14 | Succeeded by Nottingham Panthers |
| Preceded by Nottingham Panthers | Elite League Champions; 2013–14 | Succeeded by Sheffield Steelers |
| Preceded by Cardiff Devils | Challenge Cup Winners; 2017–18, 2018–18 | Succeeded by Sheffield Steelers |
| Preceded by Cardiff Devils | Elite League Champions; 2018–19, 2021–22, 2022–23 | Succeeded by Sheffield Steelers |
| Preceded by Cardiff Devils | Erhardt Conference Winners; 2018–19 | Succeeded by Last Winners |
| Preceded by Sheffield Steelers | Challenge Cup Winners; 2021–22, 2022–23 | Succeeded by Sheffield Steelers |
| Preceded by Cardiff Devils | Playoff Champions; 2022–23 | Succeeded by Sheffield Steelers |
| Preceded by Sheffield Steelers | Elite League Champions; 2024–25, 2025–26 | Succeeded by TBC |
| Preceded by Sheffield Steelers | Challenge Cup Winners; 2024–25 | Succeeded by Nottingham Panthers |
