= 2002–03 ISL season =

- League: Ice Hockey Superleague
- Sport: Ice hockey

League
- Champions: Sheffield Steelers

Challenge Cup
- Champions: Sheffield Steelers

Playoffs
- Champions: Belfast Giants

Seasons
- ← 2001–02 2003–04 →

The 2002–03 Ice Hockey Superleague season was the seventh and final season of the Ice Hockey Superleague (ISL).

The Ayr Scottish Eagles, under new management, moved from the Centrum Arena in Ayr to the Braehead Arena just outside Glasgow and shortened their name to simply the Scottish Eagles.

The Ahearne Trophy was played for again this season with the competition taking with teams from the Norwegian Eliteserien.

Starting the season with seven teams, the league invited members of the British National League (BNL) to take part in the Challenge Cup. The call was taken up by the Coventry Blaze, meaning eight teams took part in the competition. However, after playing their Challenge Cup games, the Manchester Storm went into liquidation and their record for the Challenge Cup and league games was expunged. Not long after, the Scottish Eagles confirmed they had withdrawn from the league with the intention of re-launching the following season. The Eagles' record was also expunged and their place in the Challenge Cup semi-finals was taken by third place team Belfast Giants. On 30 November 2002, the Bracknell Bees announced that they would be moving from the ISL to the BNL for the following season. When the London Arena was sold for development the London Knights had played their final game.

Leaving the ISL with only three teams, the league folded at the end of the season and the three surviving clubs – Belfast Giants, Nottingham Panthers and Sheffield Steelers – helped form the Elite Ice Hockey League for the following season (see 2003–04 EIHL season).

== Challenge Cup ==
With eight teams taking part in the Challenge Cup and with a British National League team taking part, the competition was separate to the league and the teams were split into two groups of four teams: Belfast Giants, Manchester Storm, Scottish Eagles and Sheffield Steelers were in Group A and Bracknell Bees, Coventry Blaze, London Knights and Nottingham Panthers were in Group B. The top two teams of each group progressed to the semi-finals. The semi finals and finals were all one-off games.

=== Group A ===
Group A	GP	W	T	O	L	GF	GA	Pts
Sheffield Steelers	6	5	0	0	1	22	12	10
Scottish Eagles^{1}	6	3	0	1	2	18	20	7
Belfast Giants	6	2	1	1	2	13	14	6
Manchester Storm	6	1	1	0	4	13	20	3

^{1} Belfast Giants go through taking Scottish Eagles place due to retiring from the league and competition.

=== Group B ===
Group B	GP	W	T	O	L	GF	GA	Pts
Nottingham Panthers	6	4	1	1	0	23	13	10
London Knights	6	4	0	0	2	19	12	8
Bracknell Bees	6	2	2	0	2	15	18	6
Coventry Blaze	6	0	1	1	4	13	27	2

=== Semi-finals ===
1st place Group A (Sheffield ) vs 2nd place Group B (London)

- Sheffield Steelers 5–4 London Knights (after overtime and penalty shootout)

1st place Group B (Nottingham) vs 2nd place Group A (Belfast)

- Nottingham Panthers 3–2 Belfast Giants

=== Final ===
Winner semi final 1 vs Winner semi final 2

- Sheffield Steelers 3–2 Nottingham Panthers

== Ahearne Trophy ==
The Ahearne Trophy was won by the Superleague on 8 February 2003, after Belfast Giants and Sheffield Steelers won over Frisk Tigers and Storhamar Dragons respectively.

Ahearne Trophy	GP	W	T	O	L	GF	GA	Pts
ISL (UK)	10	8	0	0	2	50	27	16
Eliteserien (Norway)	10	2	0	0	8	27	50	4

== League ==
Each team played four home games and four away games against each of their opponents. All five teams in the league were entered into the playoffs.

Superleague	GP	W	T	O	L	GF	GA	Pts
Sheffield Steelers	32	18	5	1	8	86	57	42
Belfast Giants	32	17	6	1	8	111	78	41
Nottingham Panthers	32	15	4	0	13	92	92	34
London Knights	32	11	8	1	12	87	90	31
Bracknell Bees	32	5	5	2	20	71	130	17

== Playoffs ==
All five teams in the league took part in the playoffs. After an initial round where each team played all the other teams twice at home and twice away, the top four teams qualified for the finals weekend.

=== Round one ===
Superleague	GP	W	T	O	L	GF	GA	Pts
Belfast Giants	16	12	1	1	2	65	36	26
London Knights	16	10	2	0	4	55	42	22
Nottingham Panthers	16	10	1	0	5	55	42	21
Sheffield Steelers	16	2	1	3	10	28	52	8
Bracknell Bees	16	3	1	0	12	41	72	7

=== Semi-finals ===
1st place vs 4th place

- Belfast Giants 1-0 Sheffield Steelers (after overtime and penalty shootout)

2nd place vs 3rd place

- London Knights 4–3 Nottingham Panthers

=== Final ===
Winner semi final 1 vs Winner semi final 2

- Belfast Giants 5–3 London Knights

== Awards ==
- Coach of the Year Trophy – Mike Blaisdell, Sheffield Steelers
- Player of the Year Trophy – Joel Laing, Sheffield Steelers

=== All Star teams ===
First team	Position	Second Team
Joel Laing, Sheffield Steelers	G	Ryan Bach, Belfast Giants
Robby Sandrock, Belfast Giants	D	Dion Darling, Sheffield Steelers
Marc Laniel, Sheffield Steelers	D	Jim Paek, Nottingham Panthers
Lee Jinman, Nottingham Panthers	F	Greg Hadden, Nottingham Panthers
Dan Ceman, Bracknell Bees	F	Rhett Gordon, Sheffield Steelers
Paxton Schulte, Belfast Giants	F	Kevin Riehl, Belfast Giants

== Scoring leaders ==
The scoring leaders are taken from all league games.

- Most points: 36 Lee Jinman (Nottingham Panthers)
- Most goals: 16 Den Ceman (Bracknell Bees)
- Most assists: 24 Lee Jinman (Nottingham Panthers) and Robby Sandrock (Belfast Giants)
- Most PIMs: 150 Barry Nieckar (Nottingham Panthers)
