= List of Cardiff Devils seasons =

This is a list of seasons completed by the Cardiff Devils ice hockey team, presently of the British Elite League. This list documents the season-by-season records of the Cardiff Devils from their foundation in 1986 to the present day. Beginning in Division Two Midlands, the Devils rose quickly through the ranks of British ice hockey, winning the league title and British Championship in only their fourth season of existence. Since then the club has won a further three league titles and three playoff championships as well as one Autumn Cup and one Challenge Cup.

Since winning promotion to the Premier League in 1989, Cardiff have played all but two seasons at British ice hockey's highest level. Of the ten current members of the Elite League, only the Nottingham Panthers have played more seasons in top flight ice hockey.

Autumn Cup Winners	Regular Season Champions	Playoff Champions	Challenge Cup Winners	Finished bottom of standings	Promoted

Season	League	Level	Autumn Cup	Regular Season									Post Season	Challenge Cup
Season	League	Level	Autumn Cup	Finish	GP	W	L	T	OTL	GF	GA	Pts	Post Season	Challenge Cup
1986–87	Division Two Midlands	3		1st	14	13	0	1	–	304	16	27	Won Promotion Playoff Semi-final, 10–4 (Grimsby); Lost Promotion Playoff Final, 9–10 (Aviemore)	
1987–88	Division One (South)	2		3rd	28	16	10	2	–	219	196	34		
1988–89	Division One	2		1st	24	22	2	0	–	300	110	44	Won Promotion Playoff, 21–6 (Streatham)	
1989–90	Premier League	1	Finished first in qualifying group Lost in English Final, 14–18 (Durham)	1st	32	28	3	1	–	304	146	57	Finished first in qualifying group Won in Semi-final, 5–1 (Fife); Won British Championship, 7–6 (Murrayfield)	
1990–91	Premier League	1	Finished first in qualifying group Lost in Semi-final, 8–15 (Durham)	2nd	36	21	13	2	–	274	237	44	Finished first in qualifying group Lost in Semi-final, 4–7 (Peterborough)	
1991–92	Premier League	1	Finished first in qualifying group Lost in Semi-final, 10–13 (Nottingham)	3rd	36	20	13	3	–	235	204	43	Finished third in qualifying group	
1992–93	Premier League	1	Finished second in qualifying group Won in quarter-final, 14–8 (Peterborough); Won in Semi-final, 9–4 (Nottingham); Won Autumn Cup, 10–4 (Whitley)	1st	36	28	6	2	–	319	187	58	Finished first in qualifying group Won in Semi-final, 9–0 (Murrayfield); Won British Championship, 7–4 (Humberside)	
1993–94	Premier League	1	Finished first in qualifying group Won in quarter-final, 14–12 (Slough); Won in Semi-final, 11–9 (Nottingham); Lost in Final, 2–6 (Murrayfield)	1st	44	35	9	0	–	422	220	78	Finished first in qualifying group Won in Semi-final, 9–5 (Fife); Won British Championship, 12–1 (Sheffield)	
1994–95	Premier League	1	Finished first in qualifying group Won in quarter-final, 19–5 (Durham); Won in Semi-final, 12–8 (Sheffield); Lost in Final, 2–7 (Nottingham)	2nd	44	32	8	4	–	366	217	68	Finished second in qualifying group Lost in Semi-final, 4–5 (Sheffield)	
1995–96	Premier League	1	Finished first in qualifying group Lost in quarter-final, 7–9 (Sheffield)	2nd	36	26	7	3	–	271	140	55	Finished third in qualifying group	
1996–97	Super League	1	Finished first in qualifying group Lost in quarter-final, 4–5 (Nottingham)	1st	42	30	8	3	1	208	130	64	Finished first in qualifying group Lost in Semi-final, 2–5 (Sheffield)	
1997–98	Super League	1	Finished first in qualifying group Won in quarter-final, 8–4 (Sheffield); Won in Semi-final, 8–5 (Newcastle); Lost in Final, 1–2 (Ayr)	3rd	28	15	9	2	2	99	79	34	Finished first in qualifying group Won in Semi-final, 2–0 (Sheffield); Lost in Final, 2–3 (Ayr)	Finished sixth in qualifying group
1998–99	Super League	1	Finished third in qualifying group Won in Second Round, 22–0 (Fife); Lost in quarter-final, 4–8 (London)	2nd	42	27	10	0	5	144	102	59	Finished second in qualifying group Won in Semi-final, 5–0 (Manchester); Won British Championship, 2–1 (Nottingham)	Finished third in qualifying group Lost in Semi-final, 5–6 (Nottingham)
1999–00	Super League	1	Finished first in qualifying group Won in quarter-final, 13–2 (Nottingham); Lost in Semi-final, 0–4 (Manchester)	7th	42	17	19	4	2	136	149	40	Finished third in qualifying group	Finished seventh in qualifying group
2000–01	Super League	1	Finished third in qualifying group	2nd	48	29	16	–	3	167	130	85	Finished third in qualifying group	Finished seventh in qualifying group
2001–02	British League	2		12th	44	5	38	1	–	90	312	11	Did not qualify	
2002–03	British League	2		5th	36	20	15	1	–	133	104	41	Finished second in qualifying group Won in Semi-final, 2–1 (Dundee); Lost in Final, 0–2 (Coventry)	
2003–04	Elite League	1		5th	56	23	24	6	3	155	162	55	Finished second in qualifying group Lost in Semi-final, 0–2 (Sheffield)	Finished third in qualifying group Lost in Semi-final, 2–4 (Sheffield)
2004–05	Elite League	1		3rd	50	30	15	4	1	152	121	65	Finished first in qualifying group Lost in Semi-final, 1–3 (Nottingham)	Finished first in qualifying group Won in Semi-final, 5–3 (Sheffield); Lost in Final, 5–11 (Coventry)
2005–06	Elite League	1		5th	42	18	17	6	1	110	122	43	Finished first in qualifying group Lost in Semi-final, 1–2 (Sheffield)	Finished first in qualifying group Won in Semi-final, 3–2 (Newcastle); Won Challenge Cup, 5–4 (Coventry)
2006–07	Elite League	1		3rd	54	32	17	–	5	175	152	69	Won in quarter-final, 4–3 (Manchester); Won in Semi-final, 3–2 (Coventry); Lost in Final, 1–2 (Nottingham)	Finished second in qualifying group
2007–08	Elite League	1		6th	54	26	25	–	3	164	174	55	Won in quarter-final, 7–6 (Nottingham); Lost in Semi-final, 1–2 (Sheffield)	Finished second in qualifying group Lost in Semi-final, 4–6 (Sheffield)
2008–09	Elite League	1		5th	54	28	19	–	7	174	143	63	Won in quarter-final, 6–5 (Belfast); Lost in Semi-final, 2–5 (Sheffield)	Finished fourth in qualifying group
2009–10	Elite League	1		4th	56	31	22	–	3	193	158	65	Won in quarter-final, 9–5 (Sheffield); Won in Semi-final, 6–3 (Coventry); Lost in Final, 2–2 (0-1 pens) (Belfast)	
2010–11	Elite League	1		2nd	54	42	10	–	2	269	141	87	Won in quarter-final, 8–4 (Hull); Won in Semi-final, 4–1 (Belfast); Lost in Final, 4–5 (Nottingham)	Finished second in qualifying group Lost in Semi-final, 2–5 (Belfast)
2011–12	Elite League	1		4th	54	36	12	–	6	191	158	74	Won in quarter-final, 7–4 (Coventry); Won in Semi-final, 4–3 (OT) (Belfast); Lost in Final, 0–2 (Nottingham)	Finished second in qualifying group Lost in Semi-final, 5–6 (Belfast)
2012–13	Elite League	1		5th	52	21	23	–	8	160	168	50	Won in quarter-final, 12–9 (Braehead); Lost in Semi-final, 3–6 (Nottingham); Lost in Third Place game, 5–11 (Coventry)	Finished fifth in qualifying group
2013–14	Elite League	1		9th	52	24	24	–	4	162	182	52	Did not qualify	Finished second in qualifying group Lost in Semi-final, 4–10 (Belfast)
2014–15	Elite League	1		3rd	52	34	14	–	4	210	151	72	Lost in quarter-final, 3-8 (Belfast)	Finished second in qualifying group Won in quarter-final, 8–5 (Belfast); Won in Semi-final, 9–4 (Coventry); Won Challenge Cup, 2–1 (Sheffield)
2015–16	Elite League	1		2nd	52	33	15	–	4	179	139	70	Won in quarter-final, 6–5 (Dundee); Lost in Semi-final, 2–6 (Coventry); Won in Third Place game, 6–0 (Fife)	Finished second in qualifying group Won in quarter-final, 10–6 (Dundee); Won in Semi-final, 8–4 (Belfast); Lost in Final, 0–1 (OT) (Nottingham)
2016–17	Elite League	1		1st	52	39	10	–	3	200	136	70	Won in quarter-final, 6–3 (Manchester); Won in Semi-final, 4–2 (Dundee); Lost in Final, 5–6 (Sheffield)	Finished third in qualifying group Won Challenge Cup, 3–2 (Sheffield)
2017–18	Elite League	1		1st	56	41	12	–	3	234	149	85	Won in quarter-final, 8–5 (Coventry); Won in Semi-final, 4–0 (Fife); Won British Championship, 3–1 (Sheffield)	Finished second in qualifying group Won in Semi-final, (Sheffield); Lost in Final, 3–6 (Belfast)
2018–19	Elite League	1		2nd	60	43	11	–	6	235	146	92	Won in quarter-final, 11–8 (Sheffield); Won in Semi-final, 9–4 (Nottingham); Won British Championship, 2–1 (Belfast)	Finished first in qualifying group
2019–20	Elite League	1		–	46	31	13	–	2	162	138	64	Not played	Finished second in qualifying group Won in Semi-final, 9–8 (Nottingham); Lost in Final, 3–4 (Sheffield)
2021–22	Elite League	1		3rd	54	30	15	4	5	188	131	74	Won in quarter-final, 5–4 (Glasgow); Won in Semi-final, 3–2 (Guildford); Won British Championship, 6–3 (Belfast)	Won in Quarter-final, 8–5 (Dundee); Won in Semi-final, 5–0 (Sheffield); Lost in Final, 2–3 (Belfast)
2022–23	Elite League	1		4th	54	29	14	6	5	192	142	75	Won in quarter-final, 6–3 (Coventry); Won in Semi-final, 3–2 (Sheffield); Lost in Final, 1–4 (Belfast)	Lost in Quarter-final, 4–10 (Sheffield)
2023–24	Elite League	1		2nd	54	37	14		3	210	151	77	Won in quarter-final, 7–4 (Dundee); Lost in Semi-final, 1–2 (Belfast); Won in Third Place game, 7–5 (Guildford)	Lost in Quarter-final, 5–6 (Glasgow)
2024–25	Elite League	1		4th	54	32	18		4	178	143	68	Won in quarter-final, 8–3 (Coventry); Won in Semi-final, 5–0 (Belfast); Lost in Final, 3–4 (Nottingham)	Won in Semi-final, 7–6 (Sheffield); Lost in Final, 0–4 (Belfast)
2025–26	Elite League	1		2nd	54	35	14		5	195	122	75	Won in quarter-final, 6–2 (Coventry); Won in Semi-final, 3–1 (Glasgow); Won British Championship, 5–2 (Sheffield)	Finished fourth in group stage
Regular season totals				2nd	1778	1079	534	55	100	8079	5908	2342	6 Regular season titles	
