= List of Belfast Giants seasons =

This is a list of seasons completed by the Belfast Giants ice hockey team presently of the British Elite League. This list documents the season-by-season records of the Belfast Giants from their foundation as members of the Ice Hockey Superleague in 2000 to the present day.

The Giants have won nine league titles, in 2001–02, 2005–06, 2011-12, 2013-14, 2018-19, 2021-22, 2022-23, 2024-25 and 2025-26, three Playoff Championship, in 2002–03, 2009-10 and 2022-23, and five Challenge Cup, in 2008-09, 2017-18, 2018-19, 2021-22, 2022-23 and 2024-25.

Regular Season Champions	Playoff Champions	Challenge Cup Winners	Finished bottom of standings

Season	League	Regular season									Postseason	Challenge Cup
Season	League	Finish	GP	W	L	T	OTL	GF	GA	Pts	Postseason	Challenge Cup
2000–01	Super League	6th	48	23	16	-	9	158	159	72	Finished third in qualifying group	Finished first in qualifying group Lost in Semi Final, 2-8 (Sheffield)
2001–02	Super League	1st	48	31	9	8	-	177	119	70	Finished fifth in qualifying group	Finished first in qualifying group Won in Semi Final, 9-6 (Bracknell); Lost in Final, 0-5 (Ayr)
2002–03	Super League	2nd	32	17	8	6	1	111	78	41	Finished first in qualifying group Won in Semi Final, 1-0 (Sheffield); Won British Championship, 5-3 (London)	Finished third in qualifying group Lost in Semi Final, 2-3 (Nottingham)
2003–04	Elite League	4th	56	27	21	7	1	218	185	62	Finished third in qualifying group	Finished first in qualifying group Lost in Semi Final, 5-11 (Nottingham)
2004–05	Elite League	2nd	50	31	10	7	2	170	104	71	Finished third in qualifying group	Finished third in qualifying group
2005–06	Elite League	1st	42	28	9	4	1	155	100	61	Finished second in qualifying group Lost in Semi Final, 2-4 (Newcastle)	Did not enter
2006–07	Elite League	2nd	54	34	17	-	3	192	153	71	Won in Quarter Final, 8-4 (Basingstoke); Lost in Semi Final, 1-2 (Nottingham)	Lost in Quarter Final, 3-5 (Manchester)
2007–08	Elite League	4th	54	33	19	-	2	184	150	68	Lost in Quarter Final, 6-7 (Newcastle)	Finished fifth in qualifying group
2008-09	Elite League	4th	54	35	15	-	4	216	170	74	Lost in Quarter Final, 5-6 (Cardiff)	Finished first in qualifying group Won in Semi Final, 5-2 (Coventry); Won Challenge Cup, 6-5 (Manchester)
2009-10	Elite League	2nd	56	33	16	-	5	212	137	75	Won in Quarter Final, 10-3 (Newcastle); Won in Semi Final, 1-1(3-2 pens) (Nottingham); Won British Championship, 2-2(1-0 pens) (Cardiff)	Finished first in qualifying group Lost in Semifinals, 7-8 (Cardiff)
2010-11	Elite League	3rd	54	41	9	-	4	239	130	86	Won in Quarter Final, 4-3 (Coventry); Lost in Semi Final, 1-4 (Cardiff)	Finished first in qualifying group Won in Semi Final, 5-2 (Cardiff); Lost in Final, 3-4 (Nottingham)
2011-12	Elite League	1st	54	47	5	-	2	237	102	95	Won in Quarter Final, 14-0; Lost in Semi Final, 3-4^{OT}	Finished first in qualifying group Won in Semi Final, 6-5 (Cardiff); Lost in Final, 4-10 (Nottingham)
2012-13	Elite League	2nd	52	37	10	-	5	191	132	79	Won in Quarter Final, 7-4 (Edinburgh); Won in Semi Final, 5-1 (Coventry); Lost in Final, 3-2^{OT} (Nottingham)	Finished first in qualifying group Won in Quarter Final, 8-5 (Hull); Lost in Semi Final, 4-9 (Nottingham)
2013-14	Elite League	1st	52	43	6	-	3	210	127	89	Won in Quarter Final, 7-3; Won in Semi Final, 1-0 (Fife); Lost in Final, 2-3^{OT} (Sheffield)	Finished first in qualifying group Won in Semi Final, 10-4 (Cardiff); Lost in Final, 3-5 (Nottingham)
2014-15	Elite League	5th	52	27	19	-	6	177	148	60	Won in Quarter Finals, 8-3 (Cardiff); Lost in Semi Final, 2-3^{OT} (Coventry)	Finished third in qualifying group Lost in Quarter Final, 5-8 (Cardiff)
2015-16	Elite League	4th	52	31	17	-	4	184	148	66	Lost in Quarter Final, 4-7 (Nottingham)	Finished first in qualifying group Won in Quarter Final, 11-4 (Manchester); Lost in Semi Final, 4-8 (Cardiff)
2016-17	Elite League	2nd	52	35	13	-	4	195	145	74	Won in Quarter Final, 8-3 (Fife); Lost in Semi Final, 0-2 (Sheffield); Won Third place game, 15-8 (Dundee)	Finished first in qualifying group Won in Quarter Final, 7-6 (Manchester); Lost in Semi Final, 6-9 (Cardiff)
2017-18	Elite League	5th	56	34	20	-	2	227	200	70	Lost in Quarter Final, 7-8 (Nottingham)	Finished first in qualifying group Won in Quarter Final, 13-3 (Fife); Won in Semi Final, 12-7 (Nottingham); Won Challenge Cup, 6-3 (Cardiff)
2018-19	Elite League	1st	60	45	13	-	2	238	147	91	Won in Quarter Final, 12-2 (Coventry); Won in Semi Final, 2-1 (Guildford); Lost in Final, 1-2 (Cardiff)	Finished first in qualifying group Won in Quarter Final, 12-2 (Dundee); Won in Semi Final, 7-5 (Glasgow); Won Challenge Cup, 2-1 (Guildford)
2019-20	Elite League	4th	48	28	16	-	4	149	125	60	Cancelled due to the COVID-19 pandemic	Finished third in qualifying group Lost in Quarter Final, 0-5 (Cardiff)
2021-22	Elite League	1st	54	43	9	-	2	224	108	88	Won in Quarter Final, 4-3 (Coventry); Won in Semi Final, 6-0 (Dundee); Lost in Final, 3-6 (Cardiff)	Finished first in qualifying group Won in Quarter Final, 7-4 (Coventry); Won in Semi Final, 2-1 (Nottingham); Won Challenge Cup, 3-2 (Cardiff)
2022-23	Elite League	1st	54	41	11	-	2	231	120	84	Won in Quarter Final, 7-6 (Glasgow); Won in Semi Final, 6-3 (Nottingham); Won British Championship, 4-1 (Cardiff)	Finished first in qualifying group Won in Quarter Final, 7-5 (Nottingham); Won in Semi Final, 6-3 (Guildford); Won Challenge Cup, 9-3 (Fife)
2023-24	Elite League	3rd	54	32	15	-	7	182	147	71	Won in Quarter Final, 3-2 (Coventry); Won in Semi Final, 2-1 (Cardiff); Lost in Final, 1-3 (Sheffield)	Finished first in qualifying group Lost in Quarter Final, 5-6 (Coventry)
2024-25	Elite League	1st	54	37	11	-	6	208	132	80	Won in Quarter Final, 8-3 (Dundee); Lost in Semi Final, 0-5 (Cardiff); Won in Third place game, 8-7 (Sheffield)	Finished first in qualifying group Won in Semi Final, 3-2 (Nottingham); Won Challenge Cup, 4-0 (Cardiff)
2025-26	Elite League	1st	54	40	10	-	4	207	122	84	Lost in Quarter Final, 3-2^{SO} (Glasgow)	Finished first in qualifying group Lost in Semi Final, 9-5 (Coventry)
Regular season totals			1296	853	324	32	85	4892	3238	1842	9 Regular Season Titles	
