= Man of Ice Awards =

The Man of Ice Awards were founded at the end of the 2007-2008 Elite Ice Hockey League season to commend the best in British ice hockey.

== Categories ==
Seven of the awards were voted for by coaches and captains of the ten Elite League teams. One Award, the Fan's Favourite, is voted for by the fans of Elite League Ice Hockey in the United Kingdom. Team captains voted for Coach of the Year with Paul Thompson winning in the 2007/2008 season.

In its founding year, the awards included the following categories: Best British Player, Coach of the Year, Player of the Year, Fan's Favourite, Forward of the Year, Hard as Ice, Newcomer of the Year, Netminder of the Year, and Defenceman of the Year.

== List of Winners 2007-2008 season ==
- Best British Player: Jonathan Weaver from Coventry Blaze
- Coach of the Year: Paul Thompson from Coventry Blaze
- Player of the Year: Adam Calder from Coventry Blaze
- Fan's Favourite: Kevin Bergin
- Forward of the Year: Adam Calder from Coventry Blaze
- Hard as Ice: Brett Clouthier from Manchester Phoenix
- Newcomer of the Year: Joe Tallari from Manchester Phoenix
- Netminder of the Year: Trevor Koenig from Coventry Blaze
- Defenceman of the Year: Jonathan Weaver from Coventry Blaze

== Venues ==
- 2008 – Gateway Hotel, Nottingham

== See also ==
- Best British Forward award (IHJUK)
- British Netminder of the Year (IHJUK)
- Coach of the Year Trophy (IHJUK)
- Player of the Year Trophy (IHJUK)
