= 2004–05 EIHL season =

- League: Elite Ice Hockey League
- Sport: Ice hockey
- Duration: September - March

Regular season
- Champions: Coventry Blaze

Playoffs
- Champions: Coventry Blaze

Challenge Cup
- Champions: Coventry Blaze

EIHL seasons
- ← 2003-04 2005-06 →

The 2004–05 Elite Ice Hockey League season was the second season of the British Elite Ice Hockey League (EIHL). Manchester Phoenix did not ice due as they could not agree a deal with the Manchester Evening News Arena.

The second season of the EIHL saw a series of games between the EIHL clubs and the members of the British National League (BNL). In addition to three home games and three away games against their Elite opponents, each club also played one home game and one away game against the BNL clubs in crossover matchups. Results in these crossover games would count towards a team's points tally. The NHL lockout also saw a number of National Hockey League (NHL) players join British clubs. Coventry Blaze won a Grand Slam of all three titles, winning the Championship with an overtime victory over the Nottingham Panthers.

The crossover games with the BNL clubs were seen by many to be the first stage towards the amalgamation of the two organisations into one league. However, early in the season it was revealed that teams including Edinburgh Capitals and Newcastle Vipers were seeking to resign from the BNL and join the Elite League. A withdrawal of these clubs would leave the BNL with only a small number of participating teams. This situation led to the resigning teams temporarily withdrawing their Elite League applications and entering into collective discussions on the entire BNL joining the EIHL instead. The Elite League offered the BNL clubs invitations to join the EIHL structure, which were declined due to unfavourable terms. Subsequently Edinburgh and Newcastle resubmitted individual applications to the Elite League, both of which were accepted. A combination of this and Bracknell Bees owner John Nike's announcement that he was withdrawing funding from the BNL team prompted the collapse of the BNL at the end of the 2004–05 season.

== Challenge Cup ==
During the early part of the season, the results from league games also counted towards a separate Challenge Cup table. However, in a change to the previous season, there were two groups of teams, Group A with three teams and Group B with four teams. After each team had played each team in their group once at home and once away, the top two teams of each group qualified for the semi-finals.

=== Group A ===
Group A	GP	W	T	OTL^{1}	L	GF	GA	Pts
Coventry Blaze	4	2	1	1	0	11	10	6
Sheffield Steelers	4	3	0	0	1	10	8	6
Basingstoke Bison	4	0	1	1	2	10	13	2

^{1} 1 point awarded for an overtime loss.

=== Group B ===
Group B	GP	W	T	OTL^{1}	L	GF	GA	Pts
Cardiff Devils	6	5	0	0	1	17	8	10
Nottingham Panthers	6	3	1	0	2	19	15	7
Belfast Giants	6	3	0	0	3	14	15	6
London Racers	6	0	1	1	4	9	21	2

^{1} 1 point awarded for an overtime loss.

=== Semi-finals ===
Winner A (Coventry) vs Runner-up B (Nottingham)

- Coventry Blaze 2–1 Nottingham Panthers
- Nottingham Panthers 3–3 Coventry Blaze (Coventry win 5–4 on aggregate)

Winner B (Cardiff) vs Runner-up A (Sheffield)

- Sheffield Steelers 2–2 Cardiff Devils
- Cardiff Devils 3–1 Sheffield Steelers (Cardiff win 5–3 on aggregate)

=== Final ===
First Leg

- Coventry Blaze 6–1 Cardiff Devils

Second Leg

- Cardiff Devils 4–5 Coventry Blaze (Coventry win 11–5 on aggregate)

== Elite League Table ==
The top six teams qualified for the playoffs.

Regular season standings	GP	W	T	OTL	L	GF	GA	Pts
Coventry Blaze	50	33	6	5	6	181	104	77
Belfast Giants	50	31	7	2	10	170	104	71
Cardiff Devils	50	30	4	1	15	152	121	65
Nottingham Panthers	50	25	5	6	14	136	101	61
Sheffield Steelers	50	25	5	3	17	118	110	58
London Racers	50	19	9	3	19	116	124	50
Basingstoke Bison	50	15	5	2	28	128	178	37

== Elite League Play Offs ==
The top six teams qualified for the playoffs. Group A consisted of Coventry, Nottingham and London while Group B consisted of Belfast, Cardiff and Sheffield. Each team played the other teams in its group twice at home and twice away. The top two of each group then qualified for the playoff weekend at the National Ice Centre in Nottingham.

=== Group A ===
Group A	GP	W	T	OTL	L	GF	GA	Pts
Coventry Blaze	8	5	2	0	1	29	15	12
Nottingham Panthers	8	3	2	0	3	21	29	8
London Racers	8	2	0	0	6	19	25	4

=== Group B ===
Group B	GP	W	T	OTL	L	GF	GA	Pts
Cardiff Devils	8	4	3	0	1	18	12	11
Sheffield Steelers	8	3	4	0	1	22	15	10
Belfast Giants	8	0	3	0	5	14	27	3

=== Semi-finals ===
Winner A vs Runner-up B

- Coventry Blaze 3–0 Sheffield Steelers

Winner B vs Runner-up A

- Cardiff Devils 1–3 Nottingham Panthers

=== Third place playoff ===
Loser A vs Loser B

- Sheffield Steelers 4–2 Cardiff Devils

=== Final ===
Winner A vs Winner B

- Coventry Blaze 2–1 Nottingham Panthers (after overtime)

== Other competitions ==
=== Crossover Cup ===
Crossover Cup	GP	W	T	OTL	L	GF	GA	Pts
Belfast Giants	14	12	1	1	0	67	27	26
Cardiff Devils	14	12	0	0	2	62	31	24
Nottingham Panthers	14	11	0	1	2	55	27	23
Coventry Blaze	14	10	0	1	3	57	31	21
London Racers	14	9	1	0	4	46	33	19
Basingstoke Bison	14	9	0	1	4	59	48	19
Sheffield Steelers	14	8	1	0	5	39	29	17
Bracknell Bees	14	7	1	1	5	48	33	16
Guildford Flames	14	4	1	1	8	33	44	10
Dundee Stars	14	4	0	0	10	29	56	8
Hull Stingrays	14	4	0	0	10	22	52	8
Fife Flyers	14	3	0	1	10	40	69	7
Newcastle Vipers	14	2	1	1	10	24	56	6
Edinburgh Capitals	14	0	0	1	13	30	75	1

== Awards ==
- Coach of the Year Trophy – Paul Thompson, Coventry Blaze
- Player of the Year Trophy – Tony Hand, Belfast Giants and Neal Martin, Coventry Blaze
- Ice Hockey Annual Trophy – Tony Hand, Belfast Giants
- Best British Forward – Tony Hand, Belfast Giants

=== All Star teams ===
First team	Position	Second Team
Jody Lehman, Coventry Blaze	G	Martin Klempa, Belfast Giants
Neal Martin, Coventry Blaze	D	Wade Belak, Coventry Blaze
Doug Schueller, Coventry Blaze	D	Calle Carlsson, Nottingham Panthers
Tony Hand, Belfast Giants	F	John Cullen, Cardiff Devils
Adam Calder, Coventry Blaze	F	George Awada, Belfast Giants
Vezio Sacratini, Cardiff Devils	F	Ashley Tait, Coventry Blaze

== Scoring leaders ==
The scoring leaders are taken from all league games.

- Most points: 76 Dan Carlson, Coventry Blaze
- Most goals: 37 Adam Calder, Coventry Blaze
- Most assists: 55 Tony Hand, Belfast Giants
- Most PIMs: 490 Andre Payette, Coventry Blaze

== Footnotes ==
Preceded by 2003–04 EIHL season	EIHL seasons	Succeeded by 2005–06 EIHL season
