= Barrie Moore =

Canadian ice hockey player

- Born: May 22, 1975 (age 50) London, Ontario, Canada
- Height: 5 ft 11 in (180 cm)
- Weight: 195 lb (88 kg; 13 st 13 lb)
- Position: Left wing
- Shot: Left
- Played for: Buffalo Sabres; Edmonton Oilers; Washington Capitals
- NHL draft: 220th overall, 1993; Buffalo Sabres
- Playing career: 1995–2009

Barrie Moore (born May 22, 1975) is a Canadian former professional ice hockey player.

Selected 220th overall by the Buffalo Sabres in the 1993 NHL entry draft, Moore played for the Sabres, Edmonton Oilers and Washington Capitals, playing 39 regular season games, scoring 2 goals and 6 assists for 8 points and collecting 18 penalty minutes. In 1996, he won a Calder Cup with the Rochester Americans.

== Career statistics ==
=== Regular season and playoffs ===
			Regular season					Playoffs
Season	Team	League	GP	G	A	Pts	PIM	GP	G	A	Pts	PIM
1990–91	Strathroy Blades	WOHL	24	9	10	19	14	—	—	—	—	—
1991–92	Sudbury Wolves	OHL	62	15	38	53	57	11	0	7	7	12
1992–93	Sudbury Wolves	OHL	57	13	26	39	71	14	4	3	7	19
1993–94	Sudbury Wolves	OHL	65	36	49	85	69	10	3	5	8	14
1994–95	Sudbury Wolves	OHL	60	47	42	89	67	18	15	14	29	24
1995–96	Rochester Americans	AHL	64	26	30	56	40	18	3	6	9	18
1995–96	Buffalo Sabres	NHL	3	0	0	0	0	—	—	—	—	—
1996–97	Rochester Americans	AHL	32	14	15	29	14	—	—	—	—	—
1996–97	Buffalo Sabres	NHL	31	2	6	8	18	—	—	—	—	—
1996–97	Hamilton Bulldogs	AHL	9	5	2	7	0	22	2	6	8	15
1996–97	Edmonton Oilers	NHL	4	0	0	0	0	—	—	—	—	—
1997–98	Hamilton Bulldogs	AHL	70	22	29	51	64	8	0	1	1	4
1998–99	Portland Pirates	AHL	23	3	7	10	4	—	—	—	—	—
1998–99	Indianapolis Ice	IHL	43	9	10	19	18	—	—	—	—	—
1999–00	Portland Pirates	AHL	80	18	33	51	50	4	0	0	0	6
1999–00	Washington Capitals	NHL	1	0	0	0	0	—	—	—	—	—
2000–01	Manitoba Moose	IHL	2	0	0	0	0	—	—	—	—	—
2000–01	Manchester Storm	BISL	35	11	19	30	36	6	3	3	6	2
2001–02	Columbia Inferno	ECHL	48	20	24	44	34	5	0	2	2	6
2001–02	Portland Pirates	AHL	14	2	3	5	2	—	—	—	—	—
2002–03	Columbia Inferno	ECHL	72	23	33	56	52	14	8	6	14	12
2003–04	Columbia Inferno	ECHL	59	22	36	59	22	2	1	0	1	0
2004–05	Missouri River Otters	UHL	78	16	31	47	40	6	1	1	2	2
2005–06	Coventry Blaze	EIHL	43	24	16	40	28	6	1	4	5	8
2006–07	Coventry Blaze	EIHL	54	22	23	45	46	3	0	1	1	6
2007–08	Coventry Blaze	EIHL	52	15	24	39	28	4	1	3	4	4
2008–09	Coventry Blaze	EIHL	54	20	30	50	36	3	2	0	2	6
AHL totals			292	90	119	209	174	52	5	13	18	43
NHL totals			39	2	6	8	18	—	—	—	—	—
