= Andre Payette =

Canadian ice hockey player (1976–2022)

- Born: 29 July 1976 Cornwall, Ontario, Canada
- Died: 28 September 2022 (aged 46)
- Height: 6 ft 2 in (188 cm)
- Weight: 205 lb (93 kg; 14 st 9 lb)
- Position: Left wing
- Shot: Left
- Played for: Whitley Warriors; Sheffield Steeldogs; Coventry Blaze; Newcastle Vipers; Manchester Phoenix
- NHL draft: 244th overall, 1994; Philadelphia Flyers
- Playing career: 1997–2017

Andre Payette (29 July 1976 – 28 September 2022) was a Canadian professional ice hockey left winger.

Payette was drafted in 1994 by the NHL Philadelphia Flyers, and won a Calder Cup with their American Hockey League affiliate, the Philadelphia Phantoms.

Payette signed for the Manchester Phoenix of the English Premier Ice Hockey League in the summer of 2009, following the organisation's move into the EPL from the EIHL. Payette is known for his physical play and amassed more than 3,000 minutes in the penalty box during his time in the United Kingdom.

On 23 November 2010, it was announced that Payette had signed to play for Sheffield Steeldogs of the English Premier Ice Hockey League.

Payette was released from his contract as Head Coach of the Sheffield Steeldogs in 2015, and replaced by Dominic Osman, who the club had signed from Hull Stingrays of the Elite Ice Hockey League. He later signed for the Whitley Warriors and played two seasons in the north east. He died in 2022 due to a drug overdose.

== Career statistics ==
			Regular season					Playoffs
Season	Team	League	GP	G	A	Pts	PIM	GP	G	A	Pts	PIM
1992–93	Cumberland Grads	CJHL	54	6	8	14	122	—	—	—	—	—
1993–94	Sault Ste. Marie Greyhounds	OHL	40	2	3	5	98	—	—	—	—	—
1994–95	Sault Ste. Marie Greyhounds	OHL	50	15	15	30	177	—	—	—	—	—
1995–96	Sault Ste. Marie Greyhounds	OHL	57	20	19	39	257	4	0	0	0	5
1996–97	Sault Ste. Marie Greyhounds	OHL	4	3	0	3	9	4	0	0	0	9
1996–97	Kingston Frontenacs	OHL	29	10	13	23	143	—	—	—	—	—
1997–98	Philadelphia Phantoms	AHL	56	5	5	10	209	4	0	0	0	9
1998–99	Mohawk Valley Prowlers	UHL	51	9	21	30	241	—	—	—	—	—
1998–99	Philadelphia Phantoms	AHL	12	0	1	1	34	—	—	—	—	—
1999–00	Mohawk Valley Prowlers	UHL	58	9	23	32	160	7	4	1	5	33
1999–00	Rochester Americans	AHL	2	0	0	0	0	—	—	—	—	—
2000–01	Mohawk Valley Prowlers	UHL	45	9	18	27	244	4	0	1	1	6
2000–01	Lowell Lock Monsters	AHL	23	0	1	1	94	4	0	1	1	6
2001–02	Manchester Monarchs	AHL	20	3	0	3	86	—	—	—	—	—
2001–02	Houston Aeros	AHL	1	0	0	0	0	—	—	—	—	—
2001–02	St. John's Maple Leafs	AHL	33	2	8	10	157	11	1	4	5	39
2002–03	Toledo Storm	ECHL	11	3	2	5	85	3	0	0	0	0
2002–03	Manitoba Moose	AHL	8	0	0	0	67	—	—	—	—	—
2002–03	Saint-Hyacinthe Cousin	QSPHL	11	1	6	7	118	—	—	—	—	—
2000–01	Saint-Hyacinthe Cousin	QSPHL	30	10	16	26	177	—	—	—	—	—
2004–05	Coventry Blaze	EIHL	28	10	12	22	194	8	1	2	3	64
2005–06	Newcastle Vipers	EIHL	38	10	15	25	272	8	2	2	4	26
2006–07	Newcastle Vipers	EIHL	53	16	16	32	284	2	1	1	2	6
2007–08	Newcastle Vipers	EIHL	50	3	14	17	321	3	0	1	1	11
2008–09	Newcastle Vipers	EIHL	47	4	7	11	175	—	—	—	—	—
2009–10	Manchester Phoenix	EPIHL	51	12	13	25	186	3	0	1	1	14
2010–11	Sheffield Steeldogs	EPIHL	26	6	12	18	260	1	0	0	0	35
2011–12	Sheffield Steeldogs	EPIHL	51	10	28	38	216	3	1	0	1	28
2012–13	Sheffield Steeldogs	EPIHL	40	9	15	24	255	—	—	—	—	—
2013–14	Sheffield Steeldogs	EPIHL	43	5	9	14	264	—	—	—	—	—
2014–15	Sheffield Steeldogs	EPIHL	30	2	4	6	255	2	0	0	0	10
2015–16	Whitley Warriors	NIHL	27	6	10	16	108	1	0	0	0	0
2016–17	Whitley Warriors	NIHL	20	2	4	6	153	—	—	—	—	—
AHL totals			155	10	15	25	647	19	1	5	6	54
EIHL totals			216	43	64	107	1,246	21	4	6	10	107
