= Neal Martin (ice hockey) =

Canadian retired ice hockey defenceman

- Born: September 8, 1975 (age 50) Sudbury, Ontario, Canada
- Height: 5 ft 10 in (178 cm)
- Weight: 194 lb (88 kg; 13 st 12 lb)
- Position: Defence
- Shot: Left
- Played for: Hampton Roads Admirals; San Antonio Dragons; Portland Pirates; Mississippi Sea Wolves; Waco Wizards; Long Beach Ice Dogs; Chicago Wolves; London Knights; SERC Wild Wings; Villacher SV; Coventry Blaze; AaB Ice Hockey
- National team: Canada
- NHL draft: Undrafted
- Playing career: 1996–2010

Neal Martin (born September 8, 1975 in Sudbury, Ontario) is a Canadian retired ice hockey defenceman

== Career ==
Martin began his Major Junior career with the Sault Ste. Marie Greyhounds of the OHL, having been selected in the 5th round, 79th overall, in the 1992 OHL Priority Selection Draft. Martin played sparingly in his first season with the Greyhounds, logging only 17 regular season games. The team had an extended run in the play-offs, before losing the finals to the Peterborough Petes. Nevertheless, they qualified as hosts for the 1993 Memorial Cup, which they subsequently won. He began the 1993-94 with the Greyhounds, before being traded midway through the season to home-town team Sudbury Wolves. Martin found more ice time in Sudbury, and as a result his scoring increased. During the 1994-95 season, he registered 36 points in 62 games, whilst the following season saw him register 49 points in 51 games. Following the culmination of the 1995-96 season, Martin turned professional.

The Hampton Roads Admirals of the ECHL were Martin's first professional team, he played 54 games in the 1996-97 season, registering 22 points. In addition to his time in Norfolk, Martin also played a single game for both the AHL's Portland Pirates and the IHL's San Antonio Dragons. Martin remained in the ECHL for the following season, moving to the Mississippi Sea Wolves, where his production dipped slightly, tallying 14 points in 52 games as the Sea Wolves failed to make the playoffs. Following the season in Mississippi, Martin joined the Waco Wizards of the WPHL where he went on to have a career year, registering 54 points in 50 games. During the season he also had short stints with the Chicago Wolves and the Long Beach Ice Dogs, both of the IHL.

After his success in Texas, Martin moved to the United Kingdom and signed with the London Knights of the BISL. It was a successful season, with Martin being named as a Second Team All-Star, and the Knights winning the British Championship. Martin re-signed with the Knights for the 2000-01 season. During his second season in the capital, Martin was named as an alternate captain, scored 25 points in 47 games, and was again named as a Second Team All-Star. Following his time in the United Kingdom, Martin moved to Germany in order to play for DEL side SERC Wild Wings. The Wild Wings finished last in the standings, and narrowly avoided relegation, despite this, Martin put up respectable numbers, scoring 25 points in 59 games. Martin remained with the Wild Wings for the following season, however, the team's fortunes didn't change, again finishing last in the league. Despite winning the play-down, the Wild Wings were relegated to the 2nd Bundesliga as they lost their license due to insolvency proceedings.

Following the Wild Wings relegation, Martin moved across the border to Austria and played for Villacher SV of the EBEL for the 2003-04 season. It'd be a productive one, Martin scored 18 points in 47 games as VSV finished 3rd in the regular season. They made it to the play-off final before ultimately losing to EC KAC. During the season, Martin was named to the Canadian National Team for the 2003 Lotto Cup, held in Slovakia.

Martin returned to the UK for the 2004-05 season, in order to play for the Coventry Blaze of the Elite Ice Hockey League, where he was named as an alternate captain. The EIHL was the new top-tier of the sport in the UK, following the collapse of the BISL. The team had a spectacular season, completing the British Grand Slam, after winning the regular season, Play-offs and Challenge Cup. Likewise, Martin had a strong season, scoring 15 points in 30 games and being selected as a First Team All-Star. Martin would increase his production during his second year in the Midlands, tallying 30 points in 40 games, and was again named as a First Team All-Star. His third season for the Blaze again saw increased scoring, this time registering 37 points in 50 games. The Blaze would win the regular season, and the challenge cup, with Martin once again being named as First Team All-Star. Martin returned for a fourth season in Coventry, increasing his scoring once again with 39 points in 49 games, and was named a First Team All-Star for the fourth consecutive time. The Blaze would again top the table in the regular season, and would also take home the short-lived Knock-out Cup. Following the culmination of the season, it was announced that after four years Martin would be leaving Coventry, to player for AaB Ice Hockey of the AL-Bank Ligaen.

His first season in Denmark was mixed, the team struggled, finishing 8th in the regular season and went out of the play-offs in the first round. Nevertheless, Martin managed to register 21 points in 42 games. AaB had a much better season in 2009-10, finishing 2nd in the league, before being swept in the play-off finals by SønderjyskE. Following his second year in Denmark, Martin retired from professional hockey.

In 2011, Martin was inducted to the British Ice Hockey Hall of Fame as a result of his strong career in the UK.

== Awards and achievements ==
- CHL Memorial Cup Winner (1993)
- BISL Second All-Star Team (2000) & (2001)
- British champion (2005)
- British Grand Slam (2005)
- Challenge Cup winner (2005 & 2007)
- EIHL All-Star First Team (2005, 2006, 2007 & 2008)
- EIHL champion (2005, 2007, 2008)
- EIHL MVP (2005)
- British Ice Hockey Hall of Fame inductee (2011)

== Career statistics ==
=== Regular season and playoffs ===
| | | | Regular season | | | | | Playoffs |
| Season | Team | League | GP | G | A | Pts | PIM | GP | G | A | Pts | PIM |
|---|---|---|---|---|---|---|---|---|---|---|---|---|
| 1992-93 | Sault Ste. Marie Greyhounds | OHL | 17 | 0 | 0 | 0 | 5 | 2 | 0 | 0 | 0 | 2 |
| 1993-94 | Sault Ste. Marie Greyhounds | OHL | 19 | 0 | 4 | 4 | 4 | — | — | — | — | — |
| 1993-94 | Sudbury Wolves | OHL | 21 | 2 | 6 | 8 | 6 | 10 | 0 | 1 | 1 | 5 |
| 1994-95 | Sudbury Wolves | OHL | 62 | 4 | 32 | 36 | 61 | 18 | 0 | 6 | 6 | 6 |
| 1995-96 | Sudbury Wolves | OHL | 51 | 7 | 42 | 49 | 54 | — | — | — | — | — |
| 1996-97 | Hampton Roads Admirals | ECHL | 54 | 3 | 19 | 22 | 89 | 9 | 0 | 2 | 2 | 4 |
| 1996-97 | San Antonio Dragons | IHL | 1 | 0 | 0 | 0 | 0 | — | — | — | — | — |
| 1996-97 | Portland Pirates | AHL | 1 | 0 | 2 | 2 | 0 | — | — | — | — | — |
| 1997-98 | Mississippi Sea Wolves | ECHL | 52 | 4 | 10 | 14 | 59 | — | — | — | — | — |
| 1998–99 | Waco Wizards | WPHL | 50 | 13 | 41 | 55 | 27 | 4 | 0 | 5 | 5 | 0 |
| 1998–99 | Long Beach Ice Dogs | IHL | 3 | 0 | 2 | 2 | 6 | — | — | — | — | — |
| 1998–99 | Chicago Wolves | IHL | 8 | 0 | 1 | 1 | 2 | — | — | — | — | — |
| 1999–00 | London Knights | BISL | 39 | 6 | 10 | 16 | 24 | 8 | 3 | 2 | 5 | 0 |
| 2000–01 | London Knights | BISL | 47 | 8 | 17 | 25 | 45 | 8 | 3 | 0 | 3 | 6 |
| 2001-02 | SERC Wild Wings | DEL | 59 | 4 | 21 | 25 | 89 | 7 | 2 | 2 | 4 | 22 |
| 2002-03 | SERC Wild Wings | DEL | 45 | 1 | 3 | 4 | 64 | 6 | 0 | 1 | 1 | 6 |
| 2003-04 | Villacher SV | EBEL | 47 | 3 | 15 | 18 | 56 | 7 | 1 | 2 | 3 | 14 |
| 2004–05 | Coventry Blaze | EIHL | 30 | 3 | 12 | 15 | 6 | 10 | 0 | 3 | 3 | 0 |
| 2005–06 | Coventry Blaze | EIHL | 40 | 13 | 18 | 31 | 14 | 6 | 0 | 3 | 3 | 2 |
| 2006–07 | Coventry Blaze | EIHL | 50 | 6 | 31 | 37 | 48 | 3 | 0 | 1 | 1 | 2 |
| 2007-08 | Coventry Blaze | EIHL | 49 | 11 | 28 | 39 | 44 | 4 | 0 | 2 | 2 | 8 |
| 2008–09 | AaB Ice Hockey | DEN | 42 | 5 | 16 | 31 | 46 | 5 | 0 | 0 | 0 | 2 |
| 2009–10 | AaB Ice Hockey | DEN | 21 | 2 | 5 | 7 | 16 | 14 | 3 | 2 | 5 | 20 |
| | EIHL totals | | 169 | 33 | 89 | 122 | 112 | 23 | 0 | 9 | 9 | 12 |

== Personal life ==
Martin's cousin is fellow professional hockey player Sean Blanchard, who also played for the London Knights. During Martin's time with the Blaze he attended Coventry University, graduating with a Bachelor's degree in Sports Management before studying for an MBA.
