= Rumun Ndur =

Canadian ice hockey player

- Born: July 7, 1975 (age 50) Zaria, Nigeria
- Height: 6 ft 2 in (188 cm)
- Weight: 244 lb (111 kg; 17 st 6 lb)
- Position: Defence
- Shot: Left
- Played for: Buffalo Sabres; New York Rangers; Atlanta Thrashers; Coventry Blaze; Nottingham Panthers; Muskegon Lumberjacks
- NHL draft: 69th overall, 1994; Buffalo Sabres
- Playing career: 1995–2010

Rumun Ndur (born July 7, 1975) is a Nigerian-born Canadian former professional ice hockey player. Ndur played in the National Hockey League (NHL) for the Buffalo Sabres, the New York Rangers, and the Atlanta Thrashers. Ndur was the first Nigerian-born player to play in the NHL. He was born in Nigeria but grew up in Hearst, Ontario.

== Playing career ==
Ndur moved to Union, Ontario (near London) and played minor hockey for the St. Thomas Travelers. Ndur played for the Belmont Pests Jr.D. (1990–91) and Clearwater Steeplejacks Jr.C. (1991–92) clubs of the Ontario Hockey Association. Ndur was drafted in the ninth round (129th overall) by the Guelph Storm in the 1992 Ontario Hockey League (OHL) Priority Selection.

He was drafted by the Sabres in the 1994 NHL entry draft in the third round, 69th overall. In 1996 he won the Calder Cup with the Rochester Americans. He made his NHL debut in 1996–97 with the Sabres. In 1998–99 he was traded to the New York Rangers and just a year later he was traded to Atlanta, and played 27 games with them during the 1999–2000 NHL season. Ndur played a total of 69 games in the NHL, scoring 5 points (2 goals, 3 assists) with 137 penalty minutes.

At the end of the 2005-06 season Ndur signed with HK Jesenice of the Slovenian Ice Hockey League, thus becoming first African to play for a team in Slovenia. He played 14 games, scoring 2 goals and 3 assists and also amassing 79 penalty minutes. He had a memorable fight with Boštjan Groznik, a tough enforcer. That season Ndur won the Slovenian Championship.

With the Coventry Blaze Ndur played just two games of the 2007–08 season before suffering from a neck injury, ruling him out for the season. In May 2008, Ndur was released by Coventry. Ndur went on to sign with the Nottingham Panthers of the EIHL for the 2008-09 season before returning to North America to sign with the Muskegon Lumberjacks of the International Hockey League before retiring.

== Career statistics ==
=== Regular season and playoffs ===
			Regular season					Playoffs
Season	Team	League	GP	G	A	Pts	PIM	GP	G	A	Pts	PIM
1990–91	Belmont Bombers	SOJHL	36	3	11	14	70	—	—	—	—	—
1991–92	Sarnia Bees	WOJHL	30	2	5	7	46	—	—	—	—	—
1991–92	Clearwater Steeplejacks	GLJCHL	4	0	4	4	4	—	—	—	—	—
1992–93	Guelph Storm	OHL	22	1	3	4	30	4	0	1	1	4
1992–93	Guelph Holody Platers	MWJHL	24	7	8	15	202	—	—	—	—	—
1993–94	Guelph Storm	OHL	61	6	33	39	176	9	4	1	5	24
1994–95	Guelph Storm	OHL	63	10	21	31	187	14	0	4	4	28
1995–96	Rochester Americans	AHL	73	2	12	14	306	17	1	2	3	33
1996–97	Rochester Americans	AHL	68	5	11	16	282	10	3	1	4	21
1996–97	Buffalo Sabres	NHL	2	0	0	0	2	—	—	—	—	—
1997–98	Rochester Americans	AHL	50	1	12	13	207	4	0	2	2	16
1997–98	Buffalo Sabres	NHL	1	0	0	0	2	—	—	—	—	—
1998–99	Hartford Wolf Pack	AHL	6	0	1	1	4	—	—	—	—	—
1998–99	Buffalo Sabres	NHL	8	0	0	0	16	—	—	—	—	—
1998–99	New York Rangers	NHL	31	1	3	4	46	—	—	—	—	—
1999–00	Hartford Wolf Pack	AHL	3	0	0	0	0	—	—	—	—	—
1999–00	Atlanta Thrashers	NHL	27	1	0	1	71	—	—	—	—	—
2000–01	Orlando Solar Bears	IHL	16	0	0	0	50	—	—	—	—	—
2000–01	Norfolk Admirals	AHL	21	1	2	3	93	9	1	0	1	26
2001–02	Norfolk Admirals	AHL	52	4	9	13	133	2	0	0	0	2
2002–03	Graz 99ers	EBEL	31	3	11	14	128	—	—	—	—	—
2003–04	Columbus Cottonmouths	ECHL	70	8	9	17	241	—	—	—	—	—
2004–05	Danbury Trashers	UHL	46	3	9	12	289	—	—	—	—	—
2005–06	Kalamazoo Wings	UHL	17	0	1	1	57	—	—	—	—	—
2005–06	HK Jesenice	SLO	14	2	3	5	79	—	—	—	—	—
2006–07	Coventry Blaze	EIHL	64	12	12	24	221	—	—	—	—	—
2007–08	Coventry Blaze	EIHL	2	0	1	1	6	3	1	0	1	6
2008–09	Nottingham Panthers	EIHL	34	2	3	5	191	—	—	—	—	—
AHL totals			272	13	47	60	1025	42	5	5	10	98
NHL totals			69	2	3	5	137	—	—	—	—	—
