= Mike Minard =

Canadian ice hockey player (born 1976)

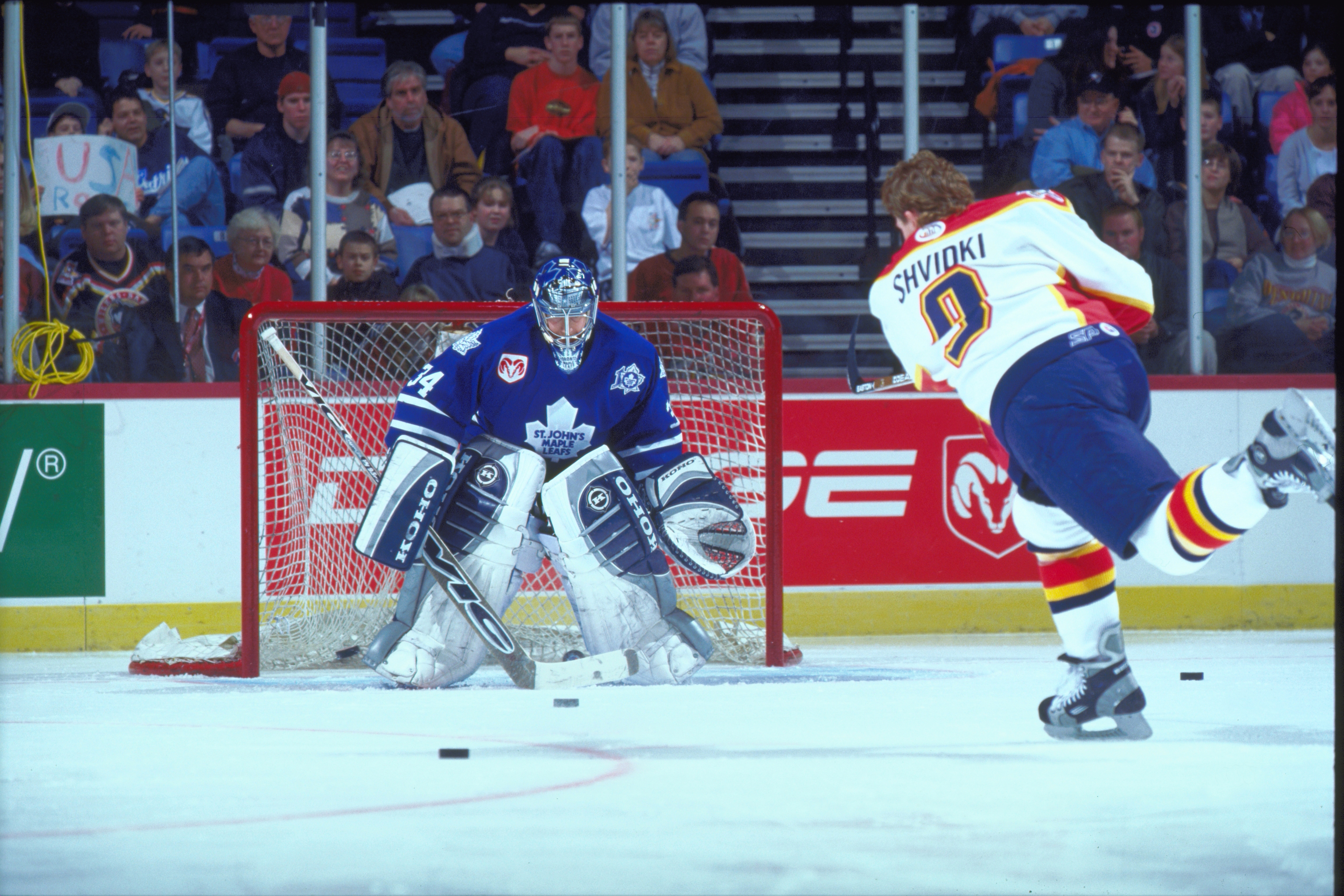
- Born: November 1, 1976 (age 49) Owen Sound, Ontario, Canada
- Height: 6 ft 2 in (188 cm)
- Weight: 200 lb (91 kg; 14 st 4 lb)
- Position: Goaltender
- Caught: Left
- Played for: Edmonton Oilers; Belfast Giants
- NHL draft: 83rd overall, 1995; Edmonton Oilers; Belfast Giants
- Playing career: 1996–2008

Michael Edward Roger Minard (born November 1, 1976) is a Canadian former professional ice hockey goaltender who played in one National Hockey League game for the Edmonton Oilers during the 1999–00 season.

== Playing career ==
Minard played with the Chilliwack Chiefs in the British Columbia Junior Hockey League (BCJHL) in the 1994–95 season, earning Coastal Rookie of the Year and Goaltender of the Year honours before he was selected in the fourth round, 83rd overall, by the Edmonton Oilers in the 1995 NHL entry draft. Most of his career was spent in the American Hockey League, and his lone NHL game came on April 8, 2000 against the Calgary Flames. Minard also played two seasons with the Belfast Giants of the British Elite Ice Hockey League, before returning to the North American minor leagues for a final season, and retiring in 2008.

== Career statistics ==
=== Regular season and playoffs ===
			Regular season									Playoffs
Season	Team	League	GP	W	L	T	MIN	GA	SO	GAA	SV%	GP	W	L	MIN	GA	SO	GAA	SV%
1992–93	St. Thomas Stars	WOHL	23	—	—	—	1374	162	0	3.10	—	—	—	—	—	—	—	—	—
1993–94	St. Thomas Stars	WOHL	31	25	5	0	1710	78	1	2.74	—	—	—	—	—	—	—	—	—
1994–95	Chilliwack Chiefs	BCJHL	40	—	—	—	2330	136	0	3.50	—	—	—	—	—	—	—	—	—
1995–96	Barrie Colts	OHL	1	0	1	0	52	8	0	9.23	.704	—	—	—	—	—	—	—	—
1995–96	Detroit Whalers	OHL	42	25	10	4	2314	128	2	3.32	.895	17	9	6	922	55	1	3.58	—
1996–97	Hamilton Bulldogs	AHL	3	1	1	0	100	7	0	4.20	.860	—	—	—	—	—	—	—	—
1996–97	Wheeling Nailers	ECHL	23	3	7	1	899	69	0	4.60	.870	3	0	2	148	16	0	6.47	—
1997–98	Hamilton Bulldogs	AHL	2	1	0	0	80	2	0	1.50	.961	—	—	—	—	—	—	—	—
1997–98	Brantford Smoke	UHL	2	1	1	0	74	7	0	5.63	.877	—	—	—	—	—	—	—	—
1997–98	New Orleans Brass	ECHL	11	6	2	0	429	30	0	4.19	.872	—	—	—	—	—	—	—	—
1997–98	Milwaukee Admirals	IHL	8	2	2	0	362	19	0	3.15	.918	—	—	—	—	—	—	—	—
1998–99	Dayton Bombers	ECHL	15	8	5	2	788	42	1	3.20	.887	—	—	—	—	—	—	—	—
1998–99	Milwaukee Admirals	IHL	10	3	5	0	531	27	0	3.05	.900	—	—	—	—	—	—	—	—
1998–99	Hamilton Bulldogs	AHL	11	8	3	0	645	30	1	2.79	.922	1	0	0	20	0	0	0.00	1.000
1999–00	Edmonton Oilers	NHL	1	1	0	0	60	3	0	3.00	.917	—	—	—	—	—	—	—	—
1999–00	Hamilton Bulldogs	AHL	38	16	12	5	1987	102	0	3.08	.904	1	0	0	23	0	0	0.00	1.000
2000–01	St. John's Maple Leafs	AHL	43	23	10	4	2252	91	1	2.42	.922	—	—	—	—	—	—	—	—
2001–02	St. John's Maple Leafs	AHL	35	14	11	7	1936	100	1	3.10	.909	4	1	3	252	15	0	3.57	.882
2002–03	Manitoba Moose	AHL	1	0	1	0	59	5	0	5.06	.828	5	2	2	282	9	0	1.91	.930
2002–03	Reading Royals	ECHL	2	0	2	0	119	17	0	8.55	.738	—	—	—	—	—	—	—	—
2002–03	Toledo Storm	ECHL	19	8	4	5	1093	42	1	2.31	.930	—	—	—	—	—	—	—	—
2003–04	Memphis RiverKings	CHL	21	8	10	2	1174	58	2	2.97	.908	—	—	—	—	—	—	—	—
2003–04	St. John's Maple Leafs	AHL	8	1	1	2	274	18	0	3.94	.865	—	—	—	—	—	—	—	—
2004–05	Columbia Inferno	ECHL	41	24	8	7	2378	95	5	2.40	.919	5	2	3	304	12	1	2.37	.918
2005–06	Belfast Giants	EIHL	38	—	—	—	2205	80	0	2.18	.927	6	—	—	—	—	—	2.50	.911
2006–07	Belfast Giants	EIHL	44	—	—	—	—	—	—	2.73	.901	—	—	—	—	—	—	—	—
2007–08	New Mexico Scorpions	CHL	33	15	12	4	1908	119	0	3.74	.895	4	—	—	—	—	—	4.12	.891
2008–09	Dundas Real McCoys	MLH	13	—	—	—	—	—	—	4.63	.869	2	—	—	—	—	—	5.00	.877
NHL totals			1	1	0	0	60	3	0	3.00	.917	—	—	—	—	—	—	—	—

== Awards and honours ==
Award	Year
BCJHL
Coastal Rookie of the Year	1995
Goaltender of the Year	1995
AHL
Yanick Dupre Memorial Award	2000, 2001
All-Star Game	2001
EIHL
Second All-Star Team	2006

== See also ==
- List of players who played only one game in the NHL
