= Martin Klempa =

Slovak ice hockey player

- Born: July 20, 1973 (age 52) Poprad, TCH
- Height: 5 ft 9 in (175 cm)
- Weight: 165 lb (75 kg; 11 st 11 lb)
- Position: Goaltender
- Caught: Left
- Played for: HK SKP Poprad; HC Košice; Molot-Prikamye Perm; Belfast Giants; Coventry Blaze; MHK Kežmarok
- National team: Slovakia
- Playing career: 1993–2011

Martin Klempa (born July 20, 1973) is a Slovak former professional ice hockey goaltender. He played in the Slovak Extraliga with HK SKP Poprad, HC Košice and MHK Kežmarok and also played in the Russian Superleague with Molot-Prikamye Perm and in the British Elite Ice Hockey League for the Belfast Giants and the Coventry Blaze.
