= Ashley Tait =

British ice hockey player (born 1975)

- Born: 9 August 1975 (age 50) Toronto, Ontario, Canada
- Height: 6 ft 1 in (185 cm)
- Weight: 176 lb (80 kg; 12 st 8 lb)
- Position: Forward
- Shoots: Right
- NIHL team Former teams: Peterborough Phantoms (Head coach); Sheffield Steelers; Ritten Sport; Coventry Blaze; Belfast Giants; Milton Keynes Lightning; Basingstoke Bison
- National team: Great Britain
- Playing career: 1990–present

Ashley Tait (born 9 August 1975) is a British ice hockey forward who is currently Head Coach for the Peterborough Phantoms of the National Ice Hockey League.

During Tait's career he has also played for Coventry Blaze, Nottingham Panthers (EIHL), Kingston Hawks (BNL), Sheffield Steelers (EIHL), Milton Keynes Lightning (EIHL), Belfast Giants (EIHL) and Ritten Renon (LIHG). Tait held the record for most senior Great Britain appearances with 110, until surpassed by Jonathan Phillips in May 2022.

== Playing career ==
Tait played junior hockey for Nottingham Panthers and progressed through the ranks playing in their ISL team in the 1999–2000 season.

After a move to Kingston Hawks, where he played two seasons in the BNL, Tait then moved back to the Nottingham Panthers for three full seasons in the Super League.

Tait moved to Coventry Blaze in 2002, a year in which the BNL saw Coventry Blaze win the League and Play-off Championship. Coventry Blaze then made their move into the Elite League in 2003.

In 2004–2005 Tait was a member of the Blaze Grand Slam team and scored the Grand Slam winning goal against Nottingham in the play-off finals at the NIC, one of Tait's 29 goals that season.

Tait took over as Blaze Team Captain in 2007 and the team secured the League Championship and Play-off title before his move to Sheffield Steelers in 2007.

Tait scored 32 goals for the Sheffield Steelers in 2008.

Tait then moved back to the Blaze in 2013. Tait departed the Blaze in May 2017.

In September 2017, Tait signed for the Milton Keynes Lightning as injury cover. After his short-term deal with MK Lightning expired, Tait moved to fellow Elite League side Belfast Giants as injury cover in December 2017.

== Career highlights ==
Powerplay Player of the month (Feb 2004)
Best Forward (03-04 Coventry Blaze)
Elite League All Star Team (04–05)
Elite League Champion (04-05 Coventry Blaze)
Elite Challenge Cup Winner (04-05 Coventry Blaze)
Elite Playoff Champion (04-05 Coventry Blaze)
Elite League Champion (06-07 Coventry Blaze)
Elite Challenge Cup Winner (06-07 Coventry Blaze)
