= Jody Lehman =

Canadian-British ice hockey player

- Born: 1 July 1975 (age 49); North Battleford, Saskatchewan
- Height: 5 ft 8 in (173 cm)
- Weight: 185 lb (84 kg; 13 st 3 lb)
- Position: Goaltender
- Caught: Left
- Played for: South Carolina Stingrays; Rochester Americans; Coventry Blaze; Sheffield Steelers; AaB Ice hockey Lloydminster Border Kings
- National team: Great Britain
- Playing career: 1997–2012

Jody Lehman (born 1 July 1975 in North Battleford, Saskatchewan, Canada) is a retired Canadian-British professional ice hockey player, most recently playing for Lloydminster Border Kings.

== Playing career ==
He began playing for the Moose Jaw Warriors of the Western Hockey League in 1991-92, and stayed there until the 1995-96 season when he moved to the Brandon Wheat Kings (also of the WHL).

Following this season he moved on to the Wichita Thunder of the Central Hockey League, before his move to the South Carolina Stingrays for the 1998-99 season. This was a successful spell for Lehman, who in his 4 seasons for South Carolina won a Kelly Cup (2000–01) and also received a call up to the Rochester Americans of the AHL.

But following the 2001-02 season Lehman moved across the Atlantic to play for the British side the Coventry Blaze. His first season was very successful as the Blaze won major honours, winning the league and the playoffs (the team went unbeaten winning the playoffs).

The next season the Blaze and Lehman moved into the newly formed Elite Ice Hockey League(EIHL) finishing 3rd in its inaugural season. The next season (2004–05) was a highly successful season for both Lehman and the Blaze as they dominated the league backed by the outstanding netminding of Lehman who had his best season for the Blaze. They went on to win the Grand Slam, winning the league, playoffs and the challenge cup. The goaltending of Lehman had been a key to this success, which was demonstrated in the playoff finals, where the Blaze won a tight game in overtime beating the Nottingham Panthers.

Following the Grand Slam season, Lehman decided to move to fellow EIHL side the Sheffield Steelers. His first two season there were far less successful both stats wise and in terms of trophies (collecting just the British Knockout Cup, after beating the Blaze over two legs).

Things turned around in the 2007-08 season as the Steelers made a late challenge for the League title, only to fall just short after a tremendous late season surge in results. They did, however, go on to win the Playoff championship. In the quarter-finals they beat the Manchester Phoenix 9-8 over two legs to qualify for the Playoff finals weekend. Here Lehman played some of the best hockey of his career, first holding the Cardiff Devils to a single goal, and saving a penalty shot in a 2-1 win. Then in the final, the Steelers beat the League champions the Coventry Blaze (2-0), with Lehman shutting them out in a tremendous performance, particularly in the closing stages as the Blaze poured on the pressure.

After speculation that Lehman would sign with another European side, he eventually re-signed for his fourth season with the Steelers. After a shakey start to the season, in which they were knocked out of both the Challenge Cup and Knockout Cup early, the Steelers settled down.

After a long season, the Sheffield Steelers won the Elite League for the first time in 5 years, thanks largely to Lehman's outstanding performances throughout the season. At the Steelers' final home game of the season on 21 March 2009, Lehman broke the British ice hockey goaltending record for most shutouts in a season. The 4-0 shutout of Basingstoke Bison was Lehman's 9th of the season.

In April 2009, Lehman announced that he felt he had achieved everything possible in the British game, and saw his move to Denmark as a fresh challenge.

Lehman now resides in his hometown of North Battleford, Sask., with his wife and children.
