= Trevor Koenig =

Canadian ice hockey player

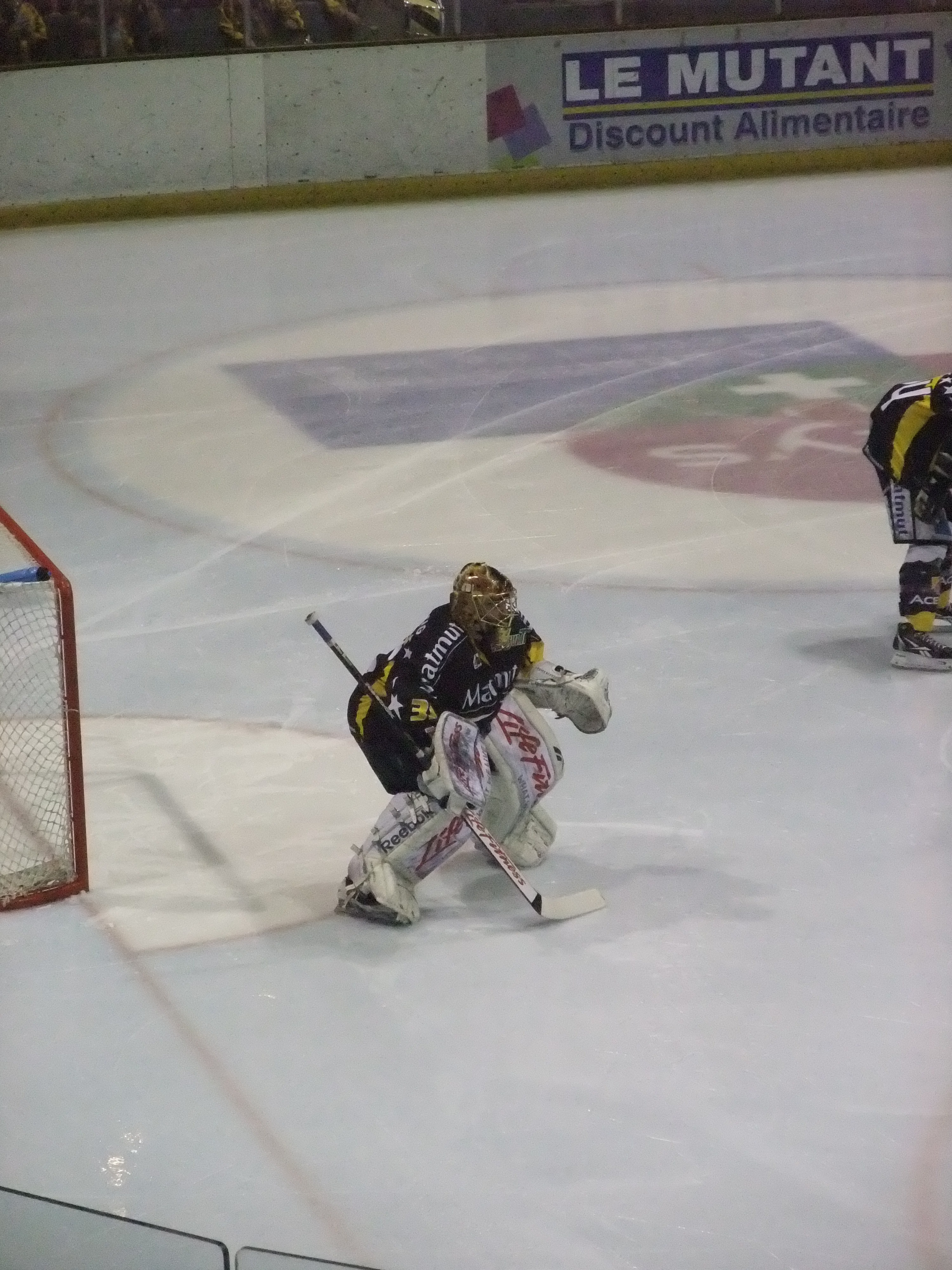
- Born: 10 December 1974 (age 51) Edmonton, AB, Canada
- Height: 5 ft 10 in (178 cm)
- Weight: 190 lb (86 kg; 13 st 8 lb)
- Position: Goaltender
- Caught: Left
- Played for: Dayton Bombers; Long Beach Ice Dogs; Detroit Vipers; Philadelphia Phantoms; Toledo Storm; Idaho Steelheads; San Diego Gulls; Cincinnati Mighty Ducks; Atlantic City Boardwalk Bullies; Newcastle Vipers; Coventry Blaze; Rødovre Mighty Bulls; Dragons de Rouen; Storhamar Dragons; Troja/Ljungby; Bentley Generals; Rosenborg; Herlev Eagles; Dundee Stars
- Playing career: 1998–2016

Trevor Koenig is a Canadian professional ice hockey goaltender. He last played for the Dundee Stars in the UK Elite Ice Hockey League.

== Career statistics ==
Season	Team	League	GP	W	L	T	MIN	GA	SO	GAA	SV%
1994–95	Union College	NCAA	20	-	-	-	-	-	-	-	-
1995–96	Union College	NCAA	20	5	12	2	1150	60	2	3.13	-
1996–97	Union College	NCAA	29	15	11	2	1681	57	4	2.03	-
1997–98	Union College	NCAA	22	5	13	3	1212	62	3	3.07	-
1998–99	Dayton Bombers	ECHL	15	9	5	0	888	45	0	3.04	.905
1998–99	Long Beach Ice Dogs	IHL	11	5	5	0	635	29	0	2.74	.897
1998–99	Detroit Vipers	IHL	6	5	0	0	300	11	1	2.20	.909
1998–99	Philadelphia Phantoms	AHL	1	0	0	0	29	2	0	4.14	.882
1999–00	Toledo Storm	ECHL	30	10	17	1	1669	108	1	3.88	.890
1999–00	Detroit Vipers	IHL	21	3	12	2	988	47	1	2.85	.913
2000–01	Idaho Steelheads	WCHL	10	7	3	0	598	21	1	2.11	.923
2000–01	San Diego Gulls	WCHL	41	28	6	3	2278	83	3	2.19	.919
2001–02	San Diego Gulls	WCHL	65	42	17	3	3693	165	5	2.68	.913
2002–03	San Diego Gulls	WCHL	49	29	15	5	2824	104	6	2.21	.917
2003–04	San Diego Gulls	ECHL	53	37	7	8	3155	114	3	2.17	.920
2003–04	Cincinnati Mighty Ducks	AHL	1	0	1	0	40	5	0	7.50	.783
2004–05	San Diego Gulls	ECHL	18	10	6	2	1076	50		2.79	.904
2004–05	Atlantic City Boardwalk Bullies	ECHL	28	17	7	2	1585	70	0	2.65	.911
2005–06	Newcastle Vipers	EIHL	52	-	-	-	-	-	-	2.16	.927
2006–07	Coventry Blaze	EIHL	51	-	-	-	-	-	-	2.08	.930
2007–08	Coventry Blaze	EIHL	65	-	-	-	-	-	-	2.21	.930
2008–09	Rødovre	DEN	42	-	-	-	-	-	-	2.16	.923
2009–10	Dragons de Rouen	FRA	53	-	-	-	-	-	-	-	-
2010–11	Storhamar Dragons	NOR	-	-	-	-	-	-	-	-	-
2011–12	Troja/Ljungby	SWE2	-	-	-	-	-	-	-	-	-
2012–13	Bentley Generals	ChHL	-	-	-	-	-	-	-	-	-
2012–13	Rosenborg	NOR	-	-	-	-	-	-	-	-	-
2013–14	Herlev Eagles	DEN	-	-	-	-	-	-	-	-	-
2014–15	Herlev Eagles	DEN	-	-	-	-	-	-	-	-	-
2015–16	Dundee Stars	EIHL	-	-	-	-	-	-	-	-	-

== Awards and honors ==
Award	Year
All-ECAC Hockey Rookie Team	1994–95
All-ECAC Hockey First Team	1996–97
AHCA East First-Team All-American	1996–97

Awards and achievements
Preceded by Tim Thomas	Ken Dryden Award; 1996–97	Succeeded by Alex Westlund
