= 2005–06 EIHL season =

- League: Elite Ice Hockey League
- Sport: Ice hockey
- Duration: September – March

Regular season
- Champions: Belfast Giants

Playoffs
- Champions: Newcastle Vipers

Challenge Cup
- Champions: Cardiff Devils

EIHL seasons
- 2004–05 2006–07

The 2005–06 Elite Ice Hockey League season ran from 9 September 2005 until 9 April 2006. The Edinburgh Capitals and Newcastle Vipers joined the Elite League from the British National League while the Manchester Phoenix did not participate for a second season due to a lack of suitable ice facility.

The Sheffield Steelers changed ownership, with Bob Phillips purchasing the club from Norton Lea while Mike Blaisdell surprised many amongst the British ice hockey community by returning to coach the Nottingham Panthers, several years after an acrimonious departure.

The London Racers withdrew their team midway through the season citing concerns that the Lee Valley Ice Centre was unsafe for Elite League level ice hockey to be played on after a series of incidents involving players and spectators.

Regulations regarding the number of non-British trained players remained at the same level as the 2004–05 season while the collapse of the British National League during the close season prevented the return of the previous season's 'crossover' games between the teams of the two leagues.

The Coventry Blaze entered the Continental Cup as the United Kingdom's representative while the 2006 Winter Olympics provided the opportunity for the Kölner Haie and Iserlohn Roosters to play a series of games against three of the Elite League's members.

== Challenge Cup ==
The format of the previous season's Challenge Cup remained the same with a separate round-robin group stage at the beginning of the season. Belfast decided not to take part in the competition due to the lack of available dates on which to play games at the Odyssey Arena. The eight participating teams were divided into two groups of four, with the winner and runner-up of each group progressing into a knockout semi final.

=== Group A ===
Group A	GP	W	T	L	OTL	GF	GA	Pts
Cardiff Devils	6	3	2	1	0	16	12	8
Coventry Blaze	6	3	1	2	0	18	12	7
London Racers	6	3	1	2	0	14	13	7
Basingstoke Bison	6	0	2	4	0	13	24	2

=== Group B ===
Group B	GP	W	T	L	OTL	GF	GA	Pts
Nottingham Panthers	6	5	0	1	0	22	8	10
Newcastle Vipers	6	3	0	3	0	19	12	6
Sheffield Steelers	6	3	0	3	0	17	10	6
Edinburgh Capitals	6	1	0	5	0	6	34	2

=== Semi-finals ===
- Winner A Vs Runner-Up B
- Cardiff Devils 2-2 Newcastle Vipers
- Newcastle Vipers 0-1 Cardiff Devils (Cardiff win 3–2 on aggregate)
- Winner B Vs Runner-Up A
- Coventry Blaze 4-4 Nottingham Panthers
- Nottingham Panthers 3-4 Coventry Blaze (Coventry win 8–7 on aggregate)

=== Final ===
In the repeat of the previous season's final, the Cardiff Devils claimed their first piece of silverware since the British Championship in 1999 by turning around a 3-0 first leg deficit to win the Cup on penalty shots after a 4–1 victory in the second leg.

- First Leg
- Coventry Blaze 3-0 Cardiff Devils
- Attendance: 2,722
- 04.15 Coventry 1-0 Cardiff – Barrie Moore (Andreas Moborg, James Pease)
- 11.34 Coventry 2-0 Cardiff – Joel Poirier (Ashley Tait, Barrie Moore)
- 12.36 Coventry 3-0 Cardiff – Jeff Hutchins (Neal Martin)
- Second Leg
- Cardiff Devils 4-1 Coventry Blaze (4–4 on aggregate, after overtime, Cardiff win 1–0 on penalty shots)
- Attendance: 2,334
- 00.20 Cardiff 1-0 Coventry – Nathan Rempel (Vezio Sacratini)
- 22.38 Cardiff 2-0 Coventry – Nathan Rempel (Vezio Sacratini, Jeff Burgoyne)
- 28.27 Cardiff 3-0 Coventry – Gerad Adams (Nathan Rempel)
- 36.54 Cardiff 3-1 Coventry – Jeff Hutchins (Russell Cowley, Tom Watkins)
- 59.40 Cardiff 4-1 Coventry – Nathan Rempel (Louis Goulet, Brad Voth)

== Elite League Table ==
Regular season standings	GP	W	L	T	OTL	GF	GA	Pts
Belfast Giants	42	28	4	9	1	166	100	61
Newcastle Vipers	42	25	4	12	1	133	101	55
Nottingham Panthers	42	23	6	11	2	111	88	54
Coventry Blaze	42	23	4	12	3	150	107	53
Cardiff Devils	42	18	6	17	1	110	112	43
Sheffield Steelers	42	15	6	19	2	105	135	38
Basingstoke Bison	42	10	2	28	2	121	174	24
Edinburgh Capitals	42	9	2	28	3	118	187	23

Belfast's decision to withdraw from the Challenge Cup allowed them to establish a commanding lead before the rest of the league had entered into their full league schedule. The Giants never relinquished first place and claimed the title on March 5, 2006, following nearest rival Newcastle's 5–2 defeat to Edinburgh.

== Elite League Play Offs ==
All eight teams qualified for the playoffs, with final league standings determining which group each team was placed in. Group A consisted of the 1st, 4th, 5th and 8th placed teams while Group B comprised the 2nd, 3rd, 6th and 7th placed teams. The winner and runner-up from each group qualified for the finals weekend at Nottingham's National Ice Centre.

=== Group A ===
Group A	GP	W	T	L	GF	GA	Pts
Cardiff Devils	6	5	0	1	19	8	10
Belfast Giants	6	3	2	1	19	14	8
Coventry Blaze	6	2	1	3	22	19	5
Edinburgh Capitals	6	0	1	5	12	31	1

=== Group B ===
Group B	GP	W	T	L	GF	GA	Pts
Newcastle Vipers	6	4	1	1	20	17	9
Sheffield Steelers	6	3	1	2	22	12	7
Nottingham Panthers	6	2	2	2	20	16	6
Basingstoke Bison	6	1	0	5	9	26	2

=== Semi-finals ===
- Winner A vs Runner-Up B
- Cardiff Devils 1-1 Sheffield Steelers (after overtime, Sheffield win 3–1 on penalty shots)
- Winner B vs Runner-Up A
- Newcastle Vipers 4-2 Belfast Giants

=== Final ===
Before a capacity crowd at the National Ice Centre, the Newcastle Vipers crowned their first season in the Elite Ice Hockey League with the Playoff Championship title.

Sheffield Steelers 1-2 Newcastle Vipers

- 9:13 Sheffield 1-0 Newcastle – Paul Sample (Mark Dutiaume, Rod Sarich)
- 23.05 Sheffield 1-1 Newcastle – Andre Payette (Shaun Johnson, David Longstaff)
- 32:14 Sheffield 1-2 Newcastle – David Longstaff (Unassisted)

== Other competitions ==
=== Knockout Cup ===
After London withdrew from the league in November 2005, a number of clubs were left with a shortfall in the number of games covered by season tickets. The British Ice Hockey Cup (or Knockout Cup as it became popularly known as) was hastily arranged in order to allow for teams to fulfil ticket commitments.

After Nottingham decided not to take part, citing the lack of availability of the National Ice Centre as a reason, the Hull Stingrays were invited and agreed to take part in the competition.

The competition was won by the Sheffield Steelers, who defeated the Coventry Blaze on penalty shots after a 1–1 draw on aggregate in the two-legged final. See below results.

Quarterfinals

- Coventry - Hull 21–4 on aggregate (12-0, 9-4)
- Edinburgh - Belfast 5–11 on aggregate (3-7, 2-4)
- Basingstoke - Cardiff 5–7 on aggregate (1-3, 4-4)
- Sheffield - Newcastle 5-4 SO on aggregate (3-2, 1-2)

Seimfinals

- Cardiff - Sheffield 5-6 SO on aggregate (3-0, 2-5)
- Belfast - Coventry 7–9 on aggregate (3-4, 4-5)

Final

- Sheffield - Coventry 2-1 SO on aggregate (0-0, 1-1)

=== Ahearne Cup ===
The 2006 Winter Olympics in Turin meant that a number of Europe's biggest leagues took a two-week break while national teams were participating in the competition in Italy. The EIHL saw this as the perfect opportunity to revive the Ahearne Cup tournament last played in 2003. The Cologne Sharks and Iserlohn Roosters of the Deutsche Eishockey Liga played four games against Coventry, Nottingham and Sheffield.

In the end, the German sides defeated the EIHL with the DEL winning all four contests.

- Coventry 2-4 Iserlohn
- Coventry 3-9 Cologne
- Sheffield 1-3 Iserlohn
- Nottingham 2-6 Cologne

== Awards ==
- Coach of the Year Trophy – Rob Wilson, Newcastle Vipers
- Player of the Year Trophy – Theo Fleury, Belfast Giants
- Ice Hockey Annual Trophy – Tony Hand, Edinburgh Capitals
- Alan Weeks Trophy – Jonathan Weaver, Newcastle Vipers
- Best British Forward – Tony Hand, Edinburgh Capitals
- Vic Batchelder Memorial Award – Nathan Craze, Belfast Giants

=== All Star teams ===
First team	Position	Second Team
Trevor Koenig, Newcastle Vipers	G	Mike Minard, Belfast Giants
Neal Martin, Coventry Blaze	D	Todd Kelman, Belfast Giants
Jan Krajíček, Newcastle Vipers	D	Jonathan Weaver, Newcastle Vipers
Theo Fleury, Belfast Giants	F	Mark Dutiaume, Sheffield Steelers
Ed Courtenay, Belfast Giants	F	Tony Hand, Edinburgh Capitals
Evan Cheverie, Coventry Blaze	F	George Awada, Belfast Giants

== Scoring leaders ==
The scoring leaders are taken from all league games.

- Most points: 81 Theo Fleury, Belfast Giants
- Most goals: 30 Barrie Moore, Coventry Blaze
- Most assists: 58 Theo Fleury, Belfast Giants
- Most PIMs: 301 Brad Voth, Cardiff Devils

Preceded by 2004–05 EIHL season	EIHL seasons	Succeeded by 2006–07 EIHL season
