= Jonathan Weaver (ice hockey) =

- Born: 20 January 1977 (age 49) Sunderland, England
- Height: 5 ft 11 in (180 cm)
- Weight: 193 lb (88 kg; 13 st 11 lb)
- Position: Defence
- Shot: Left
- team Former teams: Retired; Newcastle Vipers; Coventry Blaze; Nottingham Panthers; Telford Tigers; Durham Wasps; Newcastle Cobras; Manchester Storm (1995–2002); Detroit Vipers; Mississippi Sea Wolves; Ayr Scottish Eagles; Hull Thunder; Fife Flyers
- National team: Great Britain
- Playing career: 1992–2023

Jonathan Weaver (born 20 January 1977 in Sunderland, England) is a British professional ice hockey defenceman for the Telford Tigers of the National Ice Hockey League (NIHL). Weaver also played for the Great Britain men's national ice hockey team.

== Playing career ==
Weaver has spent most of his playing career in Britain, the majority of which with the current Newcastle Vipers franchise. He started playing at an early age with the Sunderland Commanches, Arrows, Tomahawks then Chiefs, then moved to the Durham Wasps in 1992 before they were moved to Newcastle in 1996 as the Cobras.

He moved to Manchester Storm in 1998 and had a brief spell in North America the following season, playing for Detroit Vipers and Mississippi Sea Wolves in the ECHL. He also spent some time at a training camp in the American Hockey League.

He returned to Britain in 2000 and moved to Scotland, playing three seasons with the Ayr Scottish Eagles before joining the Fife Flyers in 2002. Weaver returned to Newcastle in 2003, helping the team move up from the British National League to the Elite Ice Hockey League in 2005. In 2007 he was signed by EIHL champions Coventry Blaze and helped the team retain their crown. In 2010 he captained the Blaze to another EIHL title.

Weaver played for the Nottingham Panthers for the 2012–13 and 2013–14 seasons.

Weaver signed for Telford Tigers for the 2014–15 season.

== Awards ==
- Winner of the Alan Weeks Trophy in five consecutive seasons from 2006 to 2010.
- Named to the EIHL First All-Star Team in 2008 and 2010.
- Named to the EIHL Second All-Star Team in 2009.

== Career statistics ==
=== Regular season and playoffs ===
			Regular season					Playoffs
Season	Team	League	GP	G	A	Pts	PIM	GP	G	A	Pts	PIM
1992–93	Durham Wasps	BHL	4	0	0	0	2	–	–	–	–	–
1993–94	Durham Wasps	BHL	49	4	12	16	4	–	–	–	–	–
1994–95	Durham Wasps	BHL	41	13	15	28	0	–	–	–	–	–
1995–96	Durham Wasps	BHL	36	14	13	27	14	–	–	–	–	–
1996–97	Newcastle Cobras	BISL	40	6	8	14	2	–	–	–	–	–
1997–98	Newcastle Cobras	BISL	40	11	13	24	4	–	–	–	–	–
1998–99	Manchester Storm	BISL	39	9	18	27	6	–	–	–	–	–
1999–00	Detroit Vipers	IHL	7	2	1	3	2	–	–	–	–	–
1999–00	Mississippi Sea Wolves	ECHL	28	4	17	21	4	6	1	3	4	0
1999–00	Manchester Storm	BISL	7	2	3	5	0	–	–	–	–	–
2000–01	Ayr Scottish Eagles	BISL	41	14	22	36	20	7	5	2	7	0
2001–02	Ayr Scottish Eagles	BISL	47	16	18	34	14	3	2	0	2	2
2002–03	Ayr Scottish Eagles	BISL	7	2	6	8	4	–	–	–	–	–
2002–03	Fife Flyers	BNL	11	7	12	19	4	–	–	–	–	–
2002–03	Hull Thunder	BNL	11	8	10	18	2	–	–	–	–	–
2003–04	Newcastle Vipers	BNL	35	21	22	43	26	–	–	–	–	–
2004–05	Newcastle Vipers	BNL	34	14	29	43	42	–	–	–	–	–
2005–06	Newcastle Vipers	EIHL	42	14	34	48	40	–	–	–	–	–
2006–07	Newcastle Vipers	EIHL	52	21	40	61	77	2	2	0	2	0
2007–08	Coventry Blaze	EIHL	45	13	40	53	41	4	1	2	3	2
2008–09	Coventry Blaze	EIHL	47	22	38	60	40	3	1	4	5	2
2009–10	Coventry Blaze	EIHL	56	13	55	67	50	–	–	–	–	–
2010–11	Coventry Blaze	EIHL	48	8	40	48	32	2	0	0	0	0
2011–12	Coventry Blaze	EIHL	62	8	35	43	34	2	0	1	1	2
2012–13	Nottingham Panthers	EIHL	47	9	32	41	21	4	1	2	3	6
2013–14	Nottingham Panthers	EIHL	63	9	34	43	48	2	0	1	1	0
2014–15	Telford Tigers	EPIHL	43	9	45	54	24	3	1	4	5	16
2015–16	Telford Tigers	EPIHL	28	7	28	35	50	2	1	0	1	0
2016–17	Telford Tigers	EPIHL	34	7	34	41	14	3	1	4	5	16
2017–18	Telford Tigers	NIHL 1	22	11	34	45	8	5	3	2	5	0
2018–19	Telford Tigers	NIHL 1	28	13	47	60	14	4	2	5	7	2
2019–20	Telford Tigers	NIHL	12	5	8	13	14	–	–	–	–	–
2021–22	Telford Tigers	NIHL	39	7	29	36	16	5	1	3	4	0
2022–23	Telford Tigers	NIHL	1	0	1	1	0	–	–	–	–	–

=== International ===
Year	Team	Comp	GP	G	A	Pts	PIM
1995	Great Britain U20	WJC20-C1	4	0	1	1	8
1996	Great Britain U20	WJC20-C	4	1	2	3	14
1997	Great Britain U20	WJC20-C	4	2	3	5	31
1999	Great Britain	WC-B	7	0	2	2	2
2001	Great Britain	WC-D1	5	7	2	9	0
2002	Great Britain	WC-D1	3	0	0	0	0
2003	Great Britain	WC-D1	5	2	2	4	4
2005	Great Britain	WC-D1	5	2	4	6	6
2006	Great Britain	WC-D1	5	0	1	1	8
2007	Great Britain	WC-D1	5	1	2	3	4
2008	Great Britain	WC-D1	5	2	4	6	4
2009	Great Britain	WC-D1	5	1	2	3	4
2010	Great Britain	WC-D1	5	0	1	1	8
2011	Great Britain	WC-D1	5	1	7	8	0
Junior international totals			12	3	6	9	53
Senior international totals			55	16	27	43	40
