= Best British Forward =

British ice hockey award

The Best British Forward award is an annual British ice hockey award made to the best British forward as voted for by members of Ice Hockey Journalists UK.

The award was first made in 2003 and has since been won five times by Tony Hand and twice by Ashley Tait.

== Past winners ==
Season	Winner	Team
2008–09	Tony Hand	Manchester Phoenix
2007–08	Tony Hand	Manchester Phoenix
2006–07	Tony Hand	Manchester Phoenix
2005–06	Tony Hand	Edinburgh Capitals
2004–05	Tony Hand	Belfast Giants
2003–04	Ashley Tait	Coventry Blaze
2002–03	Ashley Tait	Coventry Blaze

== See also ==
- Man of Ice Awards
