= Challenge Cup (UK ice hockey) =

UK ice hockey competition

- Sport: Ice hockey
- First season: 1997
- Most recent champion: Nottingham Panthers (9th title)
- Most titles: Nottingham Panthers (9th title)

The Challenge Cup

The Challenge Cup, hosted annually by the Elite Ice Hockey League, is a cup competition for ice hockey clubs in the United Kingdom. It is one of three competitions run each season by the Elite League, the others being the EIHL league championship and the play-off championship, the latter of which follows directly from the former, and also crowns the British national champion. Prior to the formation of the Elite League in 2003, the Challenge Cup was organised by the Ice Hockey Superleague. Only EIHL clubs may enter the Challenge Cup, but unlike the play-offs, the competition itself is entirely independent of the league season.

First awarded during the 1997–98 season, the Challenge Cup has had numerous different formats depending on the number of teams participating and the format of other competitions run during a particular season. The first six finals were single games played at a predetermined venue, and during the first eleven seasons of the Elite League finals were contested over two legs. The final returned to a single game in the 2014–15 season. No final was contested in 2020–21, as the season was cancelled due to the coronavirus pandemic.

The most successful team in the history of the competition has been Nottingham Panthers who have taken home the trophy on nine occasions, including five-in-a-row between 2010 and 2014. The current holders of the trophy are Nottingham Panthers, who won the trophy in overtime against Coventry Blaze at the National Ice Centre.

== History and Challenge Cup Final results ==
=== 1997–2003: Superleague era ===
In 1997 the Ice Hockey Superleague reduced the league schedule from the 42 rounds of the previous season to 28. The league had hoped to arrange a new competition involving teams from Europe, leading to the shortening of the regular season. When this failed to materialise, clubs were faced with a shortfall in their fixtures. With sponsorship from the Daily Express, the Challenge Cup was launched as a result. The competition was won by the Ayr Scottish Eagles, who defeated the Bracknell Bees 3–2 in the final at the Telewest Arena. The Eagles had already won the Benson & Hedges Cup and the Superleague title and would go on to complete a Grand Slam by winning the playoff championship.

The regular season schedule returned to 42 rounds for the 1998–99 season and certain league fixtures were also designated as Challenge Cup semi final qualifiers. This format would prevail for the next three seasons. The final was held at Sheffield Arena between the Nottingham Panthers and the Sheffield Steelers and was won 4–0 by the Steelers with goals from Teeder Wynne, John Wynne, Ed Courtenay and an empty net goal from Ken Priestlay. The Steelers successfully defended the title in the 1999–00 season, defeating the same opposition 2–1 at London Arena.

The 2000–01 final was held at the newly opened Odyssey Arena in Belfast, despite calls from the Northern Ireland Assembly to postpone the game because of the foot-and mouth outbreak. The final was also put into doubt when Sheffield Steelers players threatened to strike over unpaid wages. The game eventually went ahead as planned, with the Steelers defeating the Ayr Scottish Eagles 4–2 to win a third consecutive Challenge Cup and their third title of the season. They went on to win the playoff championship, becoming the second team to win the Challenge Cup as part of a Grand Slam season.

The Odyssey Arena played host to the final again in 2002. The Ayr Scottish Eagles made a second consecutive appearance, this time facing the Belfast Giants. The Giants had won the Superleague title by 21 points and had defeated the Eagles in seven out of eight regular season meetings, tying the other. Furthermore, the Giants had lost just twice at the Odyssey Arena during the regular season. Despite being the underdog, the Eagles took an early 2–0 lead and went on to win the Cup with a 5–0 victory.

The 2002–03 season was the final season of the Superleague. The cup format was changed with a round-robin group stage at the beginning of the season. British National League side Coventry Blaze took part alongside the seven Superleague sides. Initially London, Nottingham, Sheffield and the holders Scottish Eagles (by now playing in Glasgow having dropped Ayr from their name) qualified for the semi-finals. However the Eagles withdrew from the league in November because of financial problems and their place was taken by Belfast. In the semi-finals, both played at Sheffield Arena, Nottingham defeated Belfast 3–2 and Sheffield defeated London on penalty shots after a 4–4 tie. In the final at Manchester Arena, the Steelers claimed their fourth Challenge Cup title with a 3–2 win over their arch rivals. Nottingham came from 3–0 down with two late goals but the Steelers held on for victory.

Season	Winner	Score	Runner up	Venue
1997–98	Ayr Scottish Eagles	3–2	Bracknell Bees	Telewest Arena
1998–99	Sheffield Steelers	4–0	Nottingham Panthers	Sheffield Arena
1999–2000	Sheffield Steelers (2)	2–1	Nottingham Panthers	London Arena
2000–01	Sheffield Steelers (3)	4–2	Ayr Scottish Eagles	Odyssey Arena
2001–02	Ayr Scottish Eagles (2)	5–0	Belfast Giants	Odyssey Arena
2002–03	Sheffield Steelers (4)	3–2	Nottingham Panthers	MEN Arena

=== 2003–present: Elite League era ===
==== 2003–14: Two-legged finals ====
The following season saw the launch of the Elite Ice Hockey League in place of the Superleague. The final was changed from a single game to a two-legged tie and the first round of the competition was reverted to the system used between 1998 and 2002, with designated league fixtures counting separately as Challenge Cup games. The final brought together the Nottingham Panthers and Sheffield Steelers, the fourth time to two clubs had met at this stage of the competition. The first leg, held at the National Ice Centre, ended in a 1–1 tie. In the second leg the Panthers took an early 2–0 lead, but Sheffield fought back to level the match at 2–2, forcing overtime. After 53 seconds of the extra session, Kim Ahlroos scored for the Panthers, earning them their first ever victory in a final against the Steelers and their first cup win since 1998.

The 2004–05 season saw the Coventry Blaze face the Cardiff Devils in the final. The Blaze had defeated the holders Nottingham to reach the final, while the Devils defeated Sheffield, the previous season's runner-up. The first leg in Coventry was won 6–1 by the home side. The Devils took a 4–1 lead in the second leg, but the Blaze fought back to win the match 5–4 and win the cup with an 11–5 aggregate victory. The Blaze would go to win the Elite League and playoff championships, becoming the third team to win the Challenge Cup as part of a Grand Slam winning season. The two sides met again in the final a year later, with the Blaze again winning the first leg in Coventry, this time 3–0. In the second leg the Devils emerged as 4–1 winners, tying the final 4–4 on aggregate. With overtime unable to separate the two sides, the Devils lifted their first Challenge Cup following a 1–0 win in a penalty shootout.

Coventry made their third successive appearance in the final in 2006–07, this time facing the Sheffield Steelers. For the third season running, the Blaze hosted the first leg, winning 4–3. The second leg was held at Sheffield Arena six weeks later, with the Blaze winning 5–1, regaining the cup with a 9–4 aggregate victory. The Challenge Cup was the second part of a Double won by the Blaze, the club having also secured the league championship a week earlier. The Steelers returned to the final in 2008, facing their arch rivals Nottingham Panthers. The first leg was held in Sheffield, with Nottingham securing a 6–3 win. In the second leg the Steelers took a 2–0 lead after the first period, narrowing the aggregate score to 6–5. The Panthers tied the game 2–2 and restored their three-goal advantage during the second period, but Sheffield scored twice in the third period to make the score 4–2 and again take them within one goal of tying the final. With five minutes to go, Ryan Shmyr scored for Nottingham, giving the Panthers a 4–3 deficit on the night but a 9–7 lead on aggregate. The Panthers held on to win their second Challenge Cup title.

Season	Home team	Score	Away team	Venue
2003–04	Nottingham Panthers	1–1	Sheffield Steelers	National Ice Centre
2003–04	Sheffield Steelers	2–3AOT	Nottingham Panthers	Sheffield Arena
2003–04	Nottingham won 4–3 on aggregate after overtime			
2004–05	Coventry Blaze	6–1	Cardiff Devils	SkyDome Arena
2004–05	Cardiff Devils	4–5	Coventry Blaze	Wales National Ice Rink
2004–05	Coventry won 11–5 on aggregate			
2005–06	Coventry Blaze	3–0	Cardiff Devils	SkyDome Arena
2005–06	Cardiff Devils	4–1AOT	Coventry Blaze	Wales National Ice Rink
2005–06	Aggregate: 4–4; Cardiff won 1–0 in penalty shootout			
2006–07	Coventry Blaze (2)	4–3	Sheffield Steelers	SkyDome Arena
2006–07	Sheffield Steelers	1–5	Coventry Blaze	Sheffield Arena
2006–07	Coventry won 9–4 on aggregate			
2007–08	Sheffield Steelers	3–6	Nottingham Panthers	Sheffield Arena
2007–08	Nottingham Panthers (2)	3–4	Sheffield Steelers	National Ice Centre
2007–08	Nottingham won 9–7 on aggregate			
2008–09	Manchester Phoenix	4–3	Belfast Giants	Silver Blades Ice Dome
2008–09	Belfast Giants	3–1	Manchester Phoenix	Dundonald International Ice Bowl
2008–09	Belfast won 6–5 on aggregate			
2009–10	Cardiff Devils	2–4	Nottingham Panthers	Cardiff Arena
2009–10	Nottingham Panthers (3)	4–5	Cardiff Devils	National Ice Centre
2009–10	Nottingham won 8–7 on aggregate			
2010–11	Nottingham Panthers (4)	3–1	Belfast Giants	National Ice Centre
2010–11	Belfast Giants	2–1	Nottingham Panthers	Odyssey Arena
2010–11	Nottingham won 4–3 on aggregate			
2011–12	Belfast Giants	1–5	Nottingham Panthers	Odyssey Arena
2011–12	Nottingham Panthers (5)	5–3	Belfast Giants	National Ice Centre
2011–12	Nottingham won 10–4 on aggregate			
2012–13	Sheffield Steelers	1–4	Nottingham Panthers	Sheffield Arena
2012–13	Nottingham Panthers (6)	1–2	Sheffield Steelers	National Ice Centre
2012–13	Nottingham won 5–3 on aggregate			
2013–14	Belfast Giants	5–2	Nottingham Panthers	Odyssey Arena
2013–14	Nottingham Panthers (7)	4–1AOT	Belfast Giants	Nottingham Panthers
2013–14	Aggregate: 6–6; Nottingham won 1–0 in penalty shootout			

==== 2014–present: Single-game finals ====
Season	Winner	Score	Runner up	Venue
2014–15	Cardiff Devils (2)	2–1	Sheffield Steelers	Sheffield Arena
2015–16	Nottingham Panthers (8)	1–0 (OT)	Cardiff Devils	Sheffield Arena
2016–17	Cardiff Devils (3)	3–2	Sheffield Steelers	Ice Arena Wales
2017–18	Belfast Giants (2)	6–3	Cardiff Devils	Ice Arena Wales
2018–19	Belfast Giants (3)	2–1 (OT)	Guildford Flames	Ice Arena Wales
2019–20	Sheffield Steelers (5)	4–3	Cardiff Devils	Ice Arena Wales
2021–22	Belfast Giants (4)	3–2 (OT)	Cardiff Devils	SSE Arena
2022–23	Belfast Giants (5)	9–3	Fife Flyers	SSE Arena
2023–24	Sheffield Steelers (6)	3–1	Guildford Flames	Sheffield Arena
2024–25	Belfast Giants (6)	4–0	Cardiff Devils	SSE Arena
2025–26	Nottingham Panthers (9)	3–2 (OT)	Coventry Blaze	Motorpoint Arena

== Total titles won ==
Club	Winners	Runners-up	Winning years
Nottingham Panthers	9	3	2003–04, 2007–08, 2009–10, 2010–11, 2011–12, 2012–13, 2013–14, 2015–16, 2025-26
Sheffield Steelers	6	6	1998–99, 1999–00, 2000–01, 2002–03, 2019–20, 2023–24
Belfast Giants	6	4	2008–09, 2017–18, 2018–19, 2021–22, 2022–23, 2024–25
Cardiff Devils	3	7	2005–06, 2014–15, 2016–17
Ayr Scottish Eagles	2	1	1997–98, 2001–02
Coventry Blaze	2	1	2004–05, 2006–07
Guildford Flames	0	2	
Bracknell Bees	0	1	
Manchester Phoenix	0	1	
Fife Flyers	0	1	

- Italics indicates a Cup won in the SuperLeague era. No italics indicates a Cup won in the Elite League era.
