= 2006–07 EIHL season =

- League: Elite Ice Hockey League
- Sport: Ice hockey
- Duration: September – March

Regular season
- Champions: Coventry Blaze

Playoffs
- Champions: Nottingham Panthers

Challenge Cup
- Champions: Coventry Blaze

EIHL seasons
- 2005–06 2007–08

The 2006–07 Elite Ice Hockey League season commenced on September 9, 2006 and concluded on April 8, 2007. It was the Elite League's fourth season of competition.

There was a reduction of one in the number of foreign trained players ('imports') a club was allowed to have signed at one time, with a limit of ten per team. The number of players requiring a work permit (non-British and European Union citizens) was increased from five to nine.

Clubs also had a greater number of North American players to choose from. Previously, EIHL teams were only able to sign players who had played in the NHL, AHL and ECHL, something which essentially limited EIHL clubs to a small pool of ECHL players and inflated wage demands. These new rules allowed clubs to sign players from the CHL and the UHL.

The Nottingham Panthers represented the United Kingdom in the 2006–07 Continental Cup because the 2005–06 champions Belfast Giants and runner-up Newcastle Vipers declined to take part in the tournament.

== Notable events ==
- With planning permission granted for a new rink, the Manchester Phoenix entered a team into competitions for the first time since 2003–04. While waiting for the Altrincham Ice Dome to be completed, the Phoenix played home matches at the Deeside Leisure Centre and at IceSheffield. After numerous delays the Ice Dome finally opened on February 25, 2007 with a 5–4 defeat to the Basingstoke Bison.
- The Hull Stingrays were elected to join the Elite League from the second tier English Premier League. This brought the number of actively participating members in British ice hockey's top flight to ten, the highest number since 1995–96.
- The Cardiff Devils moved to a new ice rink in Cardiff Bay. After playing on the road for the first three months of the season, the Devils played their first game at the Cardiff Bay Ice Rink on December 6, 2006 with a 7–4 victory over Manchester. Despite their difficulties, the Devils won the Knockout Cup with a 3–0 victory over Coventry Blaze in the final at the SkyDome.
- The Coventry Blaze won their second league title in three seasons, confirming the championship with a 5–1 victory over the Edinburgh Capitals on March 21, 2007 with two games to spare. The Blaze also won a second Challenge Cup with a 9–4 aggregate victory over the Sheffield Steelers in the final.
- The Nottingham Panthers clinched their first Play-off Championship since 1989 with a penalty shots win over the Cardiff Devils. The Panthers won each round of the playoffs on penalty shots, defeating their arch rivals Sheffield in the quarterfinals and the Belfast Giants in the semifinals before claiming the trophy on April 8, 2007.

== Challenge Cup ==
The preliminary round saw Coventry, Hull, Manchester and Sheffield advance to the semifinals. Coventry were drawn to face Manchester and Hull drawn against Sheffield.

=== Semifinals ===
Date		Home	Away	Result	Venue
1	December 16	Coventry Blaze 4	Manchester Phoenix 1	Final	SkyDome Arena
2	December 17	Manchester Phoenix 2	Coventry Blaze 2	Final	Deeside Leisure Centre
Coventry win 6–3 on aggregate

Date		Home	Away	Result	Venue
1	January 10	Sheffield Steelers 5	Hull Stingrays 3	Final	Hallam FM Arena
2	January 24	Hull Stingrays 0	Sheffield Steelers 1	Final	Hull Arena
Sheffield win 6–3 on aggregate

=== Final ===
Date		Home	Away	Result	Venue
1	February 14	Coventry Blaze 4	Sheffield Steelers 3	Final	SkyDome Arena
2	March 27	Sheffield Steelers 1	Coventry Blaze 5	Final	Hallam FM Arena
Coventry win 9–4 on aggregate

== Elite League Table ==
Regular season standings	GP	W	OTW	L	OTL	GF	GA	Pts
Coventry Blaze	54	31	5	15	3	188	129	75
Belfast Giants	54	27	7	17	3	192	153	71
Cardiff Devils	54	22	10	17	5	175	152	69
Sheffield Steelers	54	26	4	16	8	163	154	68
Nottingham Panthers	54	25	4	17	8	184	149	66
Manchester Phoenix	54	21	5	22	6	185	184	58
Basingstoke Bison	54	21	2	25	6	161	185	52
Newcastle Vipers	54	22	2	29	1	151	169	49
Hull Stingrays	54	15	3	33	3	114	174	39
Edinburgh Capitals	54	14	4	33	3	160	224	39

== Elite League play-offs ==
Quarter-finals
1	Coventry Blaze	5
8	Newcastle Vipers	4
3	Cardiff Devils	4
6	Manchester Phoenix	3
2	Belfast Giants	8
7	Basingstoke Bison	4
4	Sheffield Steelers	5
5	Nottingham Panthers	6

Semi-finals
1	Coventry Blaze	2
3	Cardiff Devils	3
2	Belfast Giants	1
5	Nottingham Panthers	2

Final
3	Cardiff Devils	1
5	Nottingham Panthers	2

=== Quarter-finals ===
==== Quarter Final 1: (1) Coventry Blaze vs. (8) Newcastle Vipers ====
Date		Home	Away	Result	Venue
1	March 31	Newcastle Vipers 1	Coventry Blaze 0	Final	Metro Radio Arena
2	April 1	Coventry Blaze 5	Newcastle Vipers 3	Final (OT)	SkyDome Arena
Coventry win 5–4 on aggregate after overtime

==== Quarter Final 2: (2) Belfast Giants vs. (7) Basingstoke Bison ====
Date		Home	Away	Result	Venue
1	March 31	Belfast Giants 3	Basingstoke Bison 1	Final	Odyssey Arena
2	April 1	Basingstoke Bison 3	Belfast Giants 5	Final	Planet Ice Silverdome
Belfast win 8–4 on aggregate

==== Quarter Final 3: (3) Cardiff Devils vs. (6) Manchester Phoenix ====
Date		Home	Away	Result	Venue
1	March 31	Cardiff Devils 3	Manchester Phoenix 1	Final	Cardiff Bay Ice Rink
2	April 1	Manchester Phoenix 2	Cardiff Devils 1	Final	Altrincham Ice Dome
Cardiff win 4–3 on aggregate

==== Quarter Final 4: (4) Sheffield Steelers vs. (5) Nottingham Panthers ====
Date		Home	Away	Result	Venue
1	March 31	Nottingham Panthers 4	Sheffield Steelers 2	Final	National Ice Centre
2	April 1	Sheffield Steelers 3	Nottingham Panthers 2	Final (PS)	Hallam FM Arena
Nottingham win 6–5 on aggregate after penalty shots

=== Semifinals ===
==== Semifinal 1: (1) Coventry Blaze vs. (3) Cardiff Devils ====
Date		Home	Away	Result	Venue
1	April 7	Coventry Blaze 2	Cardiff Devils 3	Final	National Ice Centre
Cardiff win 3–2

==== Semifinal 2: (2) Belfast Giants vs. (5) Nottingham Panthers ====
Date		Home	Away	Result	Venue
1	April 7	Belfast Giants 1	Nottingham Panthers 2	Final (PS)	National Ice Centre
Nottingham win 2–1 after penalty shots

=== Grand final ===
==== (3) Cardiff Devils vs. (5) Nottingham Panthers ====
Date		Home	Away	Result	Venue
1	April 8	Cardiff Devils 1	Nottingham Panthers 2	Final (PS)	National Ice Centre
Nottingham win 2–1 after penalty shots

== Awards ==
- Coach of the Year Trophy – Paul Thompson, Coventry Blaze
- Player of the Year Trophy – Mark Smith, Cardiff Devils
- Ice Hockey Annual Trophy – Tony Hand, Manchester Phoenix
- British Netminder of the Year – Stephen Murphy, Edinburgh Capitals
- Alan Weeks Trophy – Jonathan Weaver, Newcastle Vipers
- Best British Forward – Tony Hand, Manchester Phoenix

=== All Star teams ===
First Team	Position	Second Team
Trevor Koenig, Coventry Blaze	G	Ratislav Rovnianek, Nottingham Panthers
Neal Martin, Coventry Blaze	D	Tyson Teplitsky, Cardiff Devils
Jan Krajíček, Nottingham Panthers	D	Jonathan Weaver, Newcastle Vipers
Mark Smith, Cardiff Devils	F	Dan Carlson, Coventry Blaze
Adam Calder, Coventry Blaze	F	Johan Molin, Manchester Phoenix
Dan Tessier, Sheffield Steelers	F	Sean McAslan, Nottingham Panthers

Preceded by 2005–06 EIHL season	EIHL seasons	Succeeded by 2007–08 EIHL season
