= Coventry Blaze =

Professional ice hockey team in West Midlands, England

- City: Coventry, England
- League: Elite Ice Hockey League
- Founded: 2000
- Home arena: Planet Ice Coventry (capacity: 3,000)
- Colours: Dark Blue, Light Blue, White
- Owners: Paul Thompson; Mike Cowley; James Pease; Andrew Buxton
- Head coach: Kevin Moore
- Captain: Kim Tallberg
- Media: BBC CWR
- Affiliates: Coventry Blaze NIHL, NIHL 2
- Website: www.coventryblaze.co.uk
Home colours	Away colours	Third colours

Franchise history
- 1965–1996: Solihull Barons
- 1996–2000: Solihull Blaze
- 2000–present: Coventry Blaze

Championships
- Regular season titles: 4 (2004–05, 2006–07, 2007–08, 2009–10)
- Challenge Cups: 2 (2004–05, 2006–07)
- Playoff championships: 2 (2004–05, 2014–15)

The Coventry Blaze (Note: Known officially as the DPD Coventry Blaze due to sponsorship.) are a British professional ice hockey team based in Coventry, England. They currently compete in the Elite Ice Hockey League (EIHL) and play their home games at Planet Ice Coventry. The club was founded in 1965 as the original Solihull Barons and renamed the Solihull Blaze in 1996, before relocating to Coventry at the turn of the millennium. The Blaze have won four Elite Ice Hockey League Championships since the formation of the league in 2003.

== Club history ==
=== Seasons ===
==== 1996–2000: Solihull Blaze ====
The Solihull Barons evolved into Solihull Blaze before the start of the 1996–97 season, finishing second in the southern division of the British National League during the league's inaugural season. For the following season the team joined the newly formed "national division" of the English National Ice Hockey League for its inaugural season; during which members of the higher division played a dual set of fixtures; one set amongst themselves and another amongst all of the teams within the ENIHL. This season was one of the most successful on record as Blaze were victorious in both competitions and their respective play-offs. Nine goals in each leg of the play off final against Chelmsford Chieftains gave Blaze their third trophy of the season.

The Blaze left the ENIHL along with the rest of the national division during the course of the 1998–99 season, with the division becoming the English Premier League. In November 1998, they were losing finalists in the English Cup, but the side were once again crowned league champions in March with a victory in Chelmsford on 20 March. Play-off success followed in April with a 5–3 two-legged victory over season-long rivals, Milton Keynes Kings.

For the following season Blaze returned to the BNL; and made a semi-final appearance in the 1999–2000 BNL play-offs, losing to eventual winners Fife Flyers, having finished in seventh position in their first year back at British National League level. In May 2000, the club announced that they would be heading to a new 3,600-seater stadium, the Coventry Skydome, for the 2000–01 BNL campaign; renaming themselves "Coventry Blaze" in the process. This was done for the purpose of attracting a larger fan base to the team.

==== 2000–2003: Coventry Blaze ====
With eight new players on board the Blaze started their inaugural season at the Skydome with a decent run in the Benson & Hedges Cup and, after losing in their opening BNL game, proceeded to set an impressive pace in the league competition throughout October and November. The loss of key players, Craig Chapman (returned to US) and Steve Chartrand (injury) at the turn of the year were possible contributions to a dip in form which resulted in an eventual fourth-place finish. In the playoffs Blaze were unable to repeat the previous years semi-final appearance. However, the most important factor of the year was the growth in fan base from a few hundred at the start of the year to over 2000 by the end of the play-offs.

Season 2001–02 saw few changes in the line up (Canadian Ian Burt replacing Henrik Sjodin in goal, Andrew McNiven joining in place of AJ Kelham and Steve Carpenter returning to Blaze colours being the main changes.) The Season started with a run of good results in the Findus Challenge Cup which saw Blaze qualify for the Semi-Finals. This run included the first return visit to Hobs Moat Road in Solihull to take on the reformed Barons (both games saw Blaze victorious). An injury to Andrew McNiven saw ex-Steeler/Panther/Giant Steve Roberts join up with the Blaze. An impressive October/November saw the Blaze matching new-boys Dundee Stars all the way. The Finals weekend of the Challenge Cup saw Blaze comeback from 3–0 down in the semi-final to beat Basingstoke Bison and go on to meet Fife in the final, which the Flyers went on to win. Returning to the league, and the Blaze continued in fine form throughout splitting results with the Stars. Stars greater consistency, and their ability not to drop points against mid-table teams left them top of the league with the Blaze runners-up again. The play-offs saw the Blaze top their qualification group and then beat Guildford Flames over the two legged semi-final. The Final saw them take on the Stars and lose out by the narrowest of margins, 8–7, over the two legs, and for the third time in the season Blaze were runners-up.

Season 2002–03 saw another evolution not revolution in the playing staff with Jody Lehman replacing Burt in goal, Joel Poirier replacing the departed Roberts, and GB forward Ashley Tait joining the team. Blaze entered the Ice Hockey Superleague (ISL) Challenge Cup at the start of the season, and ran a couple of ISL teams close. The Findus Challenge Cup saw Blaze into the Finals where they met the Newcastle Vipers, but the result was a 0–3 loss. A run of form following the defeat saw the Blaze wrap up the league title with a victory in Dundee. This was followed up with an unbeaten play-offs run, the Final being contested against Cardiff Devils, and a narrow victory in Cardiff was followed by a first ever capacity crowd (2750) at the Skydome for a triumphant night that saw Blaze lift their second trophy of the year. Shortly after the final, Blaze announced their move into the newly formed Elite Ice Hockey League, and commenced preparations for their first ever season in the top flight of British ice hockey.

==== 2003–04 season ====
Season 2003–04 saw another major change in the club's progress as they took part in their first season as a top-flight club in the newly formed Elite League. Coach Paul Thompson stayed true to the team which had won the double in the BNL the year before, replacing only three players; defencemen Steve O'Brien and Steve Gallace coming from the ECHL to replace Andreas Moborg and Ron Shudra and college-graduate Graham Schlender replacing folk-hero Kurt Irvine. The first game of the league saw another first for the club as they flew to their game in Belfast and beat the previous year's Superleague playoff champions. A 6–1 win over Sheffield in October and an 11–0 victory over Manchester Phoenix in December were highlights as the team stayed close the leaders at the top of the table up until Christmas.

In the New Year, Blaze fell back and wins were hard to come by, but they still finished third in their first year in the top flight. The playoffs however, got off to an awful start as they lost in Cardiff minus coach Thompson, serving a one match ban following a bench clearance against the Devils the weekend before. With only four games in the group stage, Blaze were unable to get going after that loss and ended the season by finishing winless in the post-season.

==== 2004–05 season ====
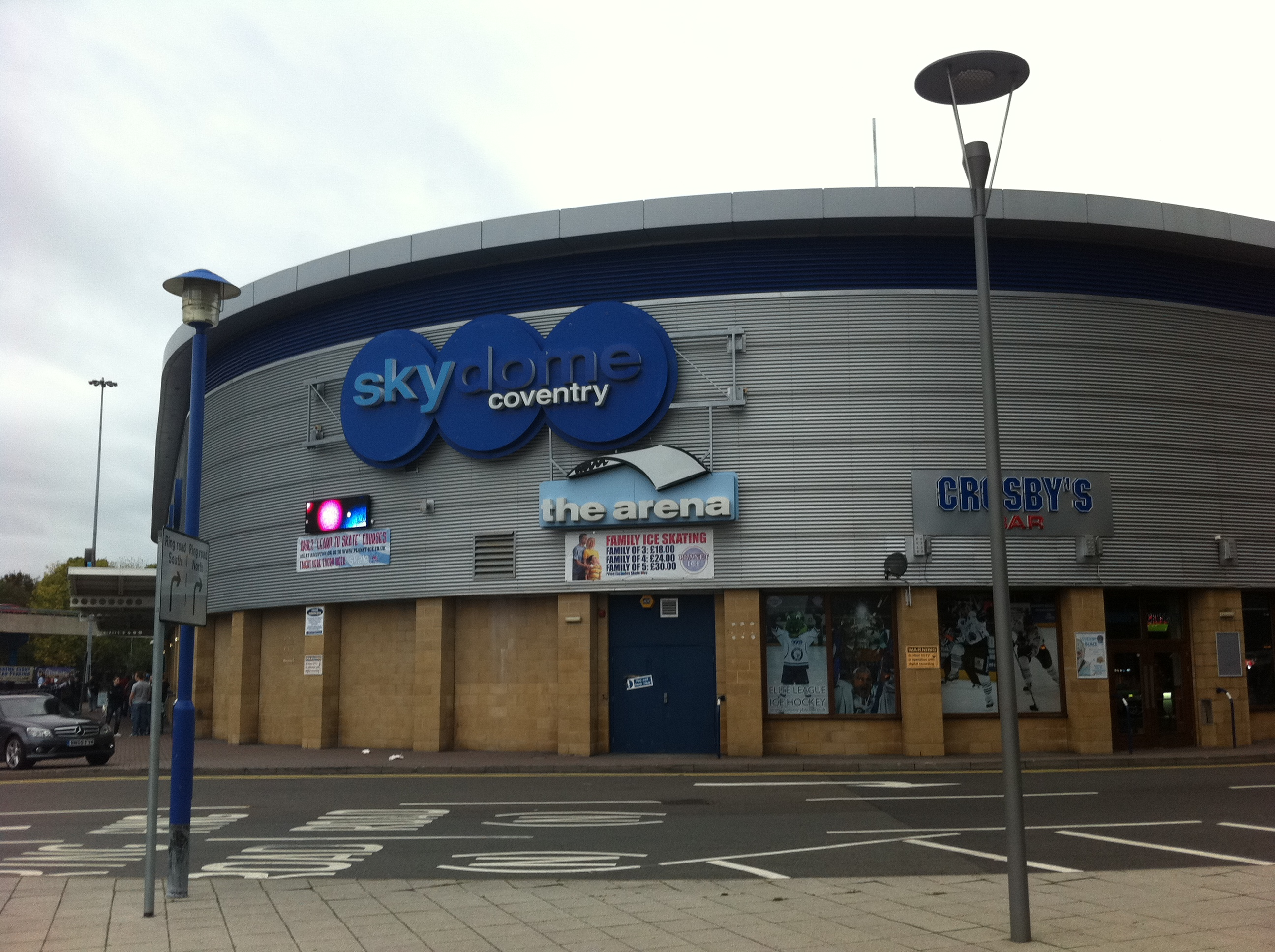
Planet Ice Coventry, home of the Blaze

The last seven months of the 2004–05 season was the most successful period in the club's history to that date. While netminder Jody Lehman and captain Ashley Tait returned to the roster, head coach Thompson made several changes to increase the team's size and speed. Among the new signings was former Superleague defenceman Neal Martin, who went on to become the league's Player of the Year and selected to the EIHL All-Star Team. The team’s first line included Dan Carlson, Adam Calder and Andre Payette. Carlson and Calder led the team’s offensive line, and Payette recorded nearly 500 penalty minutes during the campaign. The season began with the team qualifying for the Challenge Cup semi-finals and maintaining a position near the top of the league. After a potential lockout deal for NHL forward Eric Beaudoin fell through, the club signed centre Chris McNamara.

The turning point in Blaze's season came in November, as Thompson cut Slovak Michal Vrabel and brought in Toronto Maple Leafs' NHL defenceman Wade Belak, sparking a run to the end of the regular season where they only lost once in regulation time. A Doug Schueller goal against Nottingham Panthers sent Coventry to their first Challenge Cup final with a 5–4 aggregate victory, before they beat Cardiff 6–1 in the first leg of the final. A fight-strewn second-leg a week later saw Coventry battle under pressure to win the game 5–4; securing their first trophy of the season, 11–5 on aggregate. As Cardiff faltered, the league eventually became a two-horse race between Coventry and Belfast. Blaze eventually they had the chance to wrap up the title with three games to go in front of a new record crowd at the Skydome, Coventry dispatched of London Knights 5–1 and secured their place as the number one team in Britain.

Now the bid was on to add the Playoff crown to their trophy cabinet. After qualifying from their playoff group for their first finals weekend, a Jody Lehman shutout helped Blaze beat Sheffield Steelers 3–0 in their semi-final. The Playoff Final against the home-town Nottingham Panthers was tight and eventually went into sudden-death overtime tied at 1–1. But just over three minutes into the extra session, captain Ashley Tait scored the game-winner, securing Coventry Blaze's place in British Ice Hockey history as winners of the elusive Grand-Slam.

==== 2005–06 season ====
In the 2005–06 season, Coventry Blaze faced the enormity of trying to emulate their grand slam success, but before it had even begun they had suffered losses, with their entire first line and netminder moving on, as well as three key players retiring. With replacements acquired, the team began slowly, edging into the Challenge Cup semis whilst trying to keep with the early pace-setters in the league. The season high came when Blaze were British representatives in the Continental Cup group stages, winning and drawing their opening two games before falling to French hosts Grenoble in the final, deciding game. Blaze took a three-goal lead in a repeat of the previous year's Challenge Cup final against Cardiff, but could not defend this in the second leg. The Devils wiped out the advantage, with the final goal 20 seconds from time, and were the only team to score in the deciding penalty shootout to win the competition.

The remaining months offered little success as the team finished fourth and then failed to make the playoff semis. Their last chance at success came in the final of the newly created British Knockout Cup in front of a new record Skydome crowd, but resulted in another shootout loss.

==== 2006–07 season ====
With a wholesale revamp of the team, the 2006–07 season saw Coventry taking to the ice vastly more experienced for the challenge from back to front. League All-Star Trevor Koenig to goal proved to be the team's key signing, and the partnership of the Grand-Slam year was reformed as Adam Calder and Dan Carlson both returned. They were combined with proven past winners like Sylvain Cloutier, Samy Nasreddine, former NHL player Rumun Ndur, Reid Simonton and Danny Stewart.

Despite reigning champions Belfast pulling away at the top of the league, Blaze quietly qualified for both cup finals without defeat and maintained a steady pace behind the Giants. Come early February, Blaze had cut the 11-point lead Belfast held at Christmas, and when the two met at the Skydome, an 8–0 win in Coventry's favour proved a massive turning point. They were run close, but a home win against Edinburgh with a few games remaining secured Blaze's second Elite League championship in three years. A week later a second trophy was in the cabinet – a 5–1 win in Sheffield brought the Challenge Cup back to Coventry. The other two trophies eluded them thanks to the Cardiff Devils, with a 3–0 shutout on Skydome ice in the Knockout Cup final followed up by a 3–2 success in the playoff semi-finals.

==== 2007–08 season ====
Blaze entered the 2007 season with the majority of the Championship team retained. Captain Ashley Tait departed after a five-year stay and was replaced by fellow British international Jonathan Weaver in the team's big transfer story, while sniper Curtis Huppe arrived from Belfast and past-servants of the club, Russ Cowley and Matt Soderstrom, returned to Coventry for the 2007–08 season. Despite relinquishing the Challenge Cup early on with failure to escape their group and make the semis, Blaze started strong in the league and kept going throughout the season. They were the British representatives in the Continental Cup once more, this time in Aalborg, Denmark, and although they ultimately missed out on a place in the next round, they produced one of the greatest results in the club's history – a 3–2 overtime comeback win against Austrian champions Red Bull Salzburg. Domestically, Adam Calder, ably assisted again by partner Dan Carlson, proved to be Blaze's main weapon. The Canadian scorer had a career season, hitting 58 goals and 125 points in Elite League competitions as he ended the year the club's and the league's MVP.

Blaze held off their challengers to finally seal a second successive, and third overall, Elite League title. By this time Coventry had also reached the Knockout Cup final against Basingstoke, but they needed a four-goal burst in the final period of the second leg to seal a second trophy of the season – one which had proved elusive on two previous occasions. In the playoffs Blaze reached the final against league runners-up Sheffield, but a 2–0 shutout backstopped by Blaze's grand-slam goalie Jody Lehman eluded them of another treble.

==== 2008–09 season ====
The 2008–09 season resulted in the club winning no major silverware for the first time in three years.

The club reacted to losing key members of their team, in All-Stars Trevor Koenig and Neal Martin and captain Sylvain Cloutier, by building a young, mobile roster designed to last the distance. However, they lacked consistency in key areas and went through periods of poor form. All of Head Coach, Paul Thompson's new signings were familiar to British hockey bar two – Scott Kelman and Corey LeClair – who both arrived from the ECHL.

The first half of the season saw good progress, with the club taking the Charity Shield in overtime against Sheffield and qualifying for the Challenge Cup semi finals. A third representation by the club at the Continental Cup saw a winner-takes-all final game against hosts Bolzano, where a disallowed Coventry goal proved the major turning point in an eliminating 1–0 defeat.

Come January 2009 though Blaze started to falter – Kelman and LeClair were replaced after failing to adapt to the British league and the Knockout Cup was relinquished against Belfast over two legs. The changes in personnel failed to bring enough of a change in fortunes, with Coventry falling over two legs to the Giants again in the Challenge Cup semis before finishing 11 points behind Sheffield to take second in the Elite League title race. The last hope of a trophy came in the playoffs, but Nottingham provided a final devastation with a 6–2 defeat.

==== 2009–10 season ====
Coventry Blaze celebrated their 10th anniversary season in 2009–10 with a third Elite League title in four seasons, making it 10 trophies in 10 seasons since the move to the city in the summer of 2000.

Coach Paul Thompson's new signings were key as Coventry recovered from being runners-up the previous year to title winners again. Peter Hirsch was added as netminder, Brian Lee was installed on the blue-line, whilst Greg Chambers and Luke Fulghum brought goals up front.

The season started with a Challenge Cup run that fell at the group stage, but the Elite League's newly created 20–20 hockey tournament proved more of a success and Blaze were losing finalists to the Sheffield Steelers. With the cups removed from the priority list, the league became Coventry's main focus for six months, and the race for its title was to become one of the closest fought for years, going all the way to the final weekend.

To avoid a final day showdown with second-placed Belfast, Coventry as narrow leaders needed to win their penultimate game in Edinburgh. Blaze gained a two-goal lead, but with a minute to go found themselves a goal down and the big title-decider against the Giants looked likely. But Captain Adam Calder tied the scores with only 28 seconds remaining and took the game to OT, before his hat-trick goal sealed the comeback and the league championship. However, despite making the Playoff Semi-Finals for a fourth year running, they were well-beaten in Nottingham by the Cardiff Devils.

==== 2010–11 season ====
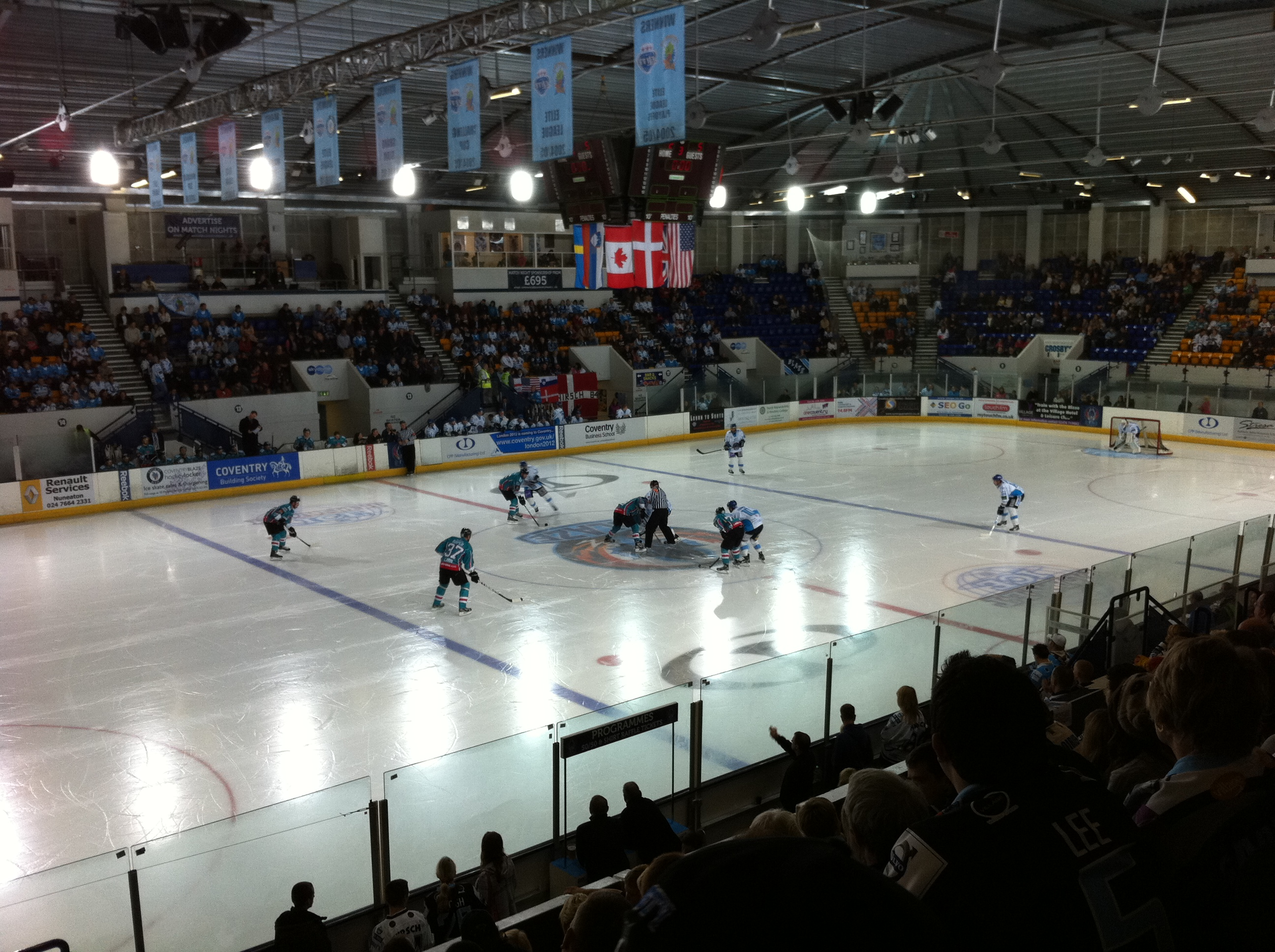
Blaze face-off against the Belfast Giants at the Skydome in October 2011.

The 2010–11 season resulted in no silverware for the Blaze.

There were not many changes from the team that won the league championship the previous season. Brett Jaeger replaced Peter Hirsh in goal whilst Canadian blueliners Brad Zanon and Jeff Smith were signed in place of long-time defenceman Tom Watkins, who moved to Telford Tigers as player-coach, and the retiring Jason Robinson. Up-front Owen Fussey was signed from rivals Edinburgh Capitals to replace the team's highest goal scorer Adam Calder.

The season did not start well with four consecutive defeats against Belfast and Nottingham leaving the Blaze at the bottom of the league table, but even a club record 12 game unbeaten run between the end of September and middle of November did not help them catch up with the leaders. From then on Blaze lost more games than they won and the result was 6th in the league standings – Coventry's worst finish in their 11-year history. Injuries were blamed for the downturn, particularly to key imports, with defenceman Jeff Smith, Brian Lee and Jonathan Weaver all requiring lengthy lay-offs which resulted in Blaze calling up inexperienced players from their ENL team as well as bringing back Jason Robinson from retirement in America to help plug the gaps on the blueline. The situation was just as bad in attack with goalscorer Owen Fussey sidelined after 34 games with a knee injury and Brad Cruikshank forced to serve a lengthy ban for his involvement in a bench clearance against rivals Nottingham in a game at the Skydome.

Away from the league there was just as little success. A strong start in the Challenge Cup soon faltered and Blaze failed to progress from the group stage, and in the playoffs the team failed to reach the finals weekend in Nottingham after suffering a 3–4 overtime loss against Belfast in the quarter finals. As defending league champions Blaze once again were Britain's representatives in the Continental Cup, and made a strong bid to reach the superfinals of the competition with 6–1 victories in their first two group games before falling 3–7 to the hosts in Rouen.

==== 2011–12 season ====
In December 2011, it was announced by the club that the Blaze were in financial difficulties due to the economic climate and events outside of their control. The Blaze issued a press statement announcing Blaze Action Month, asking the fans to get behind the club by purchasing game tickets and buying merchandise in order to raise funds.

==== 2012–13 season ====
The 2012–13 was the 10th season for the Coventry Blaze in the Elite Ice Hockey League.

== Club jerseys ==
Each season the club releases a new set of jerseys. The club always wear their blue jerseys for home games, this will consist of a navy/dark blue for the main colour along with a sky blue and white sections on the jersey. The away jersey will have the same base design but this jersey will be white for the main colour and the navy/dark blue replacing the white sections on the home jersey and the sky blue sections remain the same. The challenge cup jersey is worn only during the team's home challenge cup games, these jerseys have the same design as the other two jerseys but the main colour is now sky blue with the darker blue on the shoulders.

The club wears special edition jerseys with different designs on them celebrating Christmas, Halloween, Easter etc, as well as the league designed playoff jerseys

== Mascot ==
Scorch is the official Coventry Blaze mascot, and is a crocodile, which is rumoured to identify as a Dragon. Scorch is infamous for his unique dance moves, he interacts with fans of all teams when they visit the Skydome arena. Scorch can often be found before and during a game walking around the rink being mischievous with fans and taking photos. During the second period break, Scorch participates in Chuck-A-Puck

Scorch has been played by various volunteers over their twenty years in Coventry. Each person has kept up the persona of Scorch being mischievous and playful.

== Current squad ==
Squad for 2026-27 Elite League season

- * Denotes two-way deal with Peterborough Phantoms of the NIHL
- ** Denotes two-way deal with Bristol Pitbulls of the NIHL
- *** Denotes two-way deal with Milton Keynes Lightning of the NIHL
- **** Denotes two-way deal with Telford Tigers of the NIHL

Netminders
No.		Player	Catches	Acquired	Place of Birth	Joined from	Press Release
30	(Finland)	Sisu Heikkeri	L	2026	Helsinki, Finland	Jokerit, Mestis
31	(England)	Will Bray*	L	2022	Nottingham, England	IK Kronan, 2. Divisioona
39	(England)	Joel Bearman	L	2025	England	Coventry Blaze NIHL, NIHL 2
50	(Canada)	Evan Fitzpatrick	L	2026	St. John's, Canada	Nürnberg Ice Tigers, DEL

Defencemen
No.		Player	Shoots	Acquired	Place of Birth	Joined from	Press Release
3	(England)	Jake Hayward***	R	2026	Coventry, England	Red River Spartans, USPHL
4	(United States)	Carson Musser	L	2026	Grand Rapids, United States	Norfolk Admirals, ECHL
6	(Canada)	Andrew Nielsen	L	2026	Red Deer, Canada	Maine Mariners, ECHL
7	(Canada)	Connor Russell	R	2025	Guelph, Canada	Jacksonville Icemen, ECHL
22	(Hungary)	Márkó Csollák	L	2026	Budapest, Hungary	DVTK Jegesmedvék, Erste Liga
33	(England)	Rhodes Mitchell-King****	L	2026	Warwick, England	Telford Tigers, NIHL
37	(Canada)	Nick Grima	R	2026	Toronto, Canada	Indy Fuel, ECHL
58	(England) (United Kingdom)	David Clements A	R	2015	Coventry, England	Milton Keynes Lightning, EPIHL

Forwards
No.		Player	Position	Acquired	Place of Birth	Joined from	Press Release
8	(England)	Brynley Capps	F	2024	Chelmsford, England	Romford Raiders, NIHL
9	(United States)	Sam Ruffin	F	2025	Westfield, United States	Huntsville Havoc, SPHL
10	(Canada)	Tanner Kaspick	C	2026	Brandon, Canada	Karlskrona HK, HockeyEttan
11	(England) (Canada) (United Kingdom)	Brett Perlini	C/RW	2026	Sault Ste. Marie, Canada	Cardiff Devils, EIHL
14	(Canada)	Colby MacArthur	C/RW	2026	Summerside, Canada	Kansas City Mavericks, ECHL
15	(England)	Jack Hopkins	C	2023	Nottingham, England	Nottingham Panthers, EIHL
18	(Canada)	Ryan Richardson	LW/RW	2026	Stittsville, Canada	Greensboro Gargoyles, ECHL
24	(England)	Zaine McKenzie	RW/C	2024	Coventry, England	Nottingham Panthers, EIHL
27	(United States)	Jaxson Ezman	F	2026	Middleton, United States	Princeton Tigers, NCAA Division I
28	(Ukraine)	Artem Buzoberya	LW/C	2025	Kharkiv, Ukraine	Bentley Falcons, NCAA Division I
40	(Denmark)	William Boysen	RW	2025	Denmark	SønderjyskE Ishockey, Metal Ligaen
63	(United States)	Matthew Gleason	C	2025	Saint Paul, United States	St Thomas Tommies, NCAA Division I
71	(England)	Sean Morris**	RW/D	2026	Nottingham, England	Bristol Pitbulls, NIHL
77	(United States)	Griffin Ness	RW/C	2026	Wayzata, United States	Kalamazoo Wings, ECHL
86	(United States)	Grant Mismash	LW/C	2025	Edina, United States	Belfast Giants, EIHL

Team Staff
No.		Name	Position	Place of Birth	Joined from	Press Release
N/A	(United States)	Kevin Moore	Head coach	Belle Mead, United States	Nottingham Panthers, EIHL
N/A	(Canada)	Coltyn Bates	Assistant Coach	Brandon, Canada	Winkler Flyers, MJHL
N/A	(England)	Ethan Kane	Equipment manager	England	Appointed in 2019
N/A	(England)	Steve Small	Assistant Equipment manager	Birmingham, England	Involved with club since 2000
N/A	(England)	Anthony Pountney	Assistant Equipment manager	England	Appointed in 2023

Recent departures
No.		Player	Position	Acquired	Leaving For	Press Release
10	(United States)	Adam Robbins	F	2025	TBC
13	(Canada)	Grayson Constable	F	2024	Retired
16	(Sweden)	Kim Tallberg C	LW/RW	2022	Tingsryds AIF, HockeyEttan
18	(Northern Ireland) (Canada)	Mack Stewart	RW/LW	2025	Milton Keynes Lightning, NIHL
19	(United States)	Elijiah Barriga	C/LW	2025	Gothiques d'Amiens, Ligue Magnus
20	(Canada)	Mat Robson	G	2024	Nottingham Panthers, EIHL
21	(England)	Archie Hazeldine	D	2023	Milton Keynes Lightning, NIHL
23	(United States)	Colton Saucerman	D	2025	Retired
27	(Canada)	Michael Pelech	C	2025	Sheffield Steeldogs, NIHL
33	(Canada)	Dershahn Stewart	G	2025	Solway IHC, NIHL
52	(England)	Billy Thorpe	D	2024	Peterborough Phantoms, NIHL
61	(Canada)	Alessio Luciani	F	2023	Pionniers de Chamonix Mont-Blanc, Ligue Magnus
62	(Finland)	Jere Vertanen	D	2025	Gothiques d'Amiens, Ligue Magnus
77	(Canada)	Jordan Power	D	2025	Guildford Flames, EIHL

== Head coaches ==
The Coventry Blaze head coach is currently Kevin Moore.

Former Coaches for the Blaze include Paul Thompson, who also coached the Great Britain men's national ice hockey team while Coach of the Blaze. Thompson stood down as coach in 2013 and former player Mathias Soderstrom took over but was replaced in 2014 by Sheffield Steelers Assistant Coach Marc Le Febvre. Le Febvre was then replaced by first Steven Goertzen in a short term role in November 2014, and then a month later replaced by Chuck Weber who agreed to coach until the end of the season.

After an initial tough start, Weber against all odds took Blaze to the play-off final beating favourites Sheffield Steelers 4–2. Weber subsequently signed for a further season and again reached the final of the playoffs however this time Blaze lost 2–0 to Nottingham Panthers.

Weber's departure was announced soon after, and was swiftly replaced by ex-player Danny Stewart who returned to the club from the Fife Flyers ahead of the 2016–17 season. Stewart moved on to the Nottingham Panthers in 2024.

In May 2024, Coventry appointed the Nottingham Panthers assistant Kevin Moore as their new head coach.

- Paul Thompson, 2000–2013
- Mathias Soderstrom, 2013–2014
- Marc LeFebvre, 2014
- Steven Goertzen, 2014
- Chuck Weber, 2014–2016
- Danny Stewart, 2016–2024
- Kevin Moore, 2024–

== Season-by-season record ==
Coventry Blaze season-by-season record

Season	League	GP	W	L	T	OTL	PTS	GF	GA	League Position
2000–01	British League	36	26	9	0	1	53	215	111	4th
2001–02	British League	44	33	9	2	0	68	227	118	2nd
2002–03	British League	36	30	4	1	1	62	173	69	1st
2003–04	Elite Ice Hockey League	56	29	20	7	0	65	186	156	3rd
2004–05	Elite Ice Hockey League	50	33	6	6	5	77	181	104	1st
2005–06	Elite Ice Hockey League	42	23	12	4	3	53	150	107	4th
2006–07	Elite Ice Hockey League	54	36	15	0	3	75	186	129	1st
2007–08	Elite Ice Hockey League	54	41	11	0	2	84	217	127	1st
2008–09	Elite Ice Hockey League	54	38	14	0	2	78	228	151	2nd
2009–10	Elite Ice Hockey League	56	38	18	0	0	76	228	174	1st
2010–11	Elite Ice Hockey League	54	23	27	0	4	50	198	185	6th
2011–12	Elite Ice Hockey League	54	32	22	0	2	66	203	159	5th
2012–13	Elite Ice Hockey League	59	28	25	0	4	62	175	203	4th
2013–14	Elite Ice Hockey League	52	24	22	0	6	54	168	167	6th
2014–15	Elite Ice Hockey League	52	24	25	0	3	51	127	145	6th
2015–16	Elite Ice Hockey League	52	24	25	0	3	51	160	177	8th
2016–17	Elite Ice Hockey League	52	19	28	0	5	43	147	198	9th
2017–18	Elite Ice Hockey League	56	25	26	0	5	55	189	186	8th
2018–19	Elite Ice Hockey League	60	27	25	0	8	62	209	221	8th
2019–20	Elite Ice Hockey League	48	27	14	0	7	61	180	158	3rd^{†}
2020–21	Elite Ice Hockey League	Cancelled^{††}	N/A	N/A	N/A	N/A	N/A	N/A	N/A	N/A
2021–22	Elite Ice Hockey League	54	23	26	0	5	51	154	173	8th
2022–23	Elite Ice Hockey League	54	33	15	0	6	72	200	161	5th
2023–24	Elite Ice Hockey League	54	23	25	0	6	52	147	185	6th
2024–25	Elite Ice Hockey League	54	30	20	0	4	64	183	167	5th
2025–26	Elite Ice Hockey League	54	25	22	0	7	57	167	176	7th

Note: GP = Games played; W = Wins; L = Losses; T = Ties; OTL = Overtime Losses; PTS = Points; GF = Goals For; GA = Goals Against

^{†} Note: The 2019–20 season was cancelled completely in March 2020 due to the coronavirus pandemic, and the league and play-offs concluded without a winner being crowned. The above stat line indicates Coventry's league position (3rd) at the time of the cancellation.

^{††} Note: The 2020–21 Elite League season - originally scheduled for a revised start date of 5 December - was suspended on 15 September 2020, because of ongoing coronavirus pandemic restrictions. The EIHL board determined that the season was non-viable without supporters being permitted to attend matches and unanimously agreed to a suspension. The season was cancelled completely in February 2021. Coventry were later announced as one of four Elite League teams taking part in the 'Elite Series' between April–May 2021, a total of 24 games culminating in a best-of-three play-off final series.

== Honours ==
Here is the most up to date Coventry Blaze Honours List (Coventry era only, from 2000 onwards):

Pre-EIHL Honours (Coventry Era, 2000–03)

• British National League Champions: 2002–03 • British National League Playoff Champions: 2002–03

Elite Ice Hockey League (EIHL) Era (2003–present)

• EIHL Regular Season / League Championships (4):2004–05, 2006–07, 2007–08, 2009–10 • EIHL Playoff Championships (2):2004–05, 2014–15 • EIHL Challenge Cup (2):2004–05, 2006–07 • EIHL British Knockout Cup (1):2007–08 • EIHL Charity Shield (1):2008

Special Achievement • Grand Slam (Treble): 2004–05(Won EIHL Regular Season, EIHL Playoffs, and EIHL Challenge Cup in the same season — the only Grand Slam in club history and one of the rarest achievements in British ice hockey.)

European / Continental Cup History Qualified for the IIHF Continental Cup five times:

• Reached second group stage: 2005–06, 2007–08 (Aalborg — memorable 3–2 OT win over Red Bull Salzburg), 2015–16 • Reached third group stage: 2008–09 (Bolzano hosts), 2010–11 (Rouen hosts)

Doubles & Two-Peats

• Doubles: • 2002–03: British National League + Playoffs • 2006–07: EIHL League + Challenge Cup • 2007–08: EIHL League + Knockout Cup • Two-Peats (Back-to-Back League Titles):2006–07 and 2007–08

Elite Ice Hockey League First Team All-Stars

- 2004–05 Jody Lehman, Neal Martin, Doug Schueller, Adam Calder
- 2005–06 Neal Martin, Evan Cheverie
- 2006–07 Trevor Koenig, Neal Martin, Adam Calder
- 2007–08 Trevor Koenig, Neal Martin, Jonathan Weaver, Adam Calder
- 2009–10 Luke Fulghum, Jonathan Weaver
- 2011–12 Shea Guthrie
- 2012–13 Mike Schutte
- 2013–14 Ryan Ginand
- 2014–15 Brian Stewart
- 2018–19 Ben Lake
- 2019–20 C.J. Motte, Luke Ferrara
- 2024–25 Chase Gresock

Elite Ice Hockey League Second Team All-Stars

- 2003–04 Steve O'Brien, Steve Gallace
- 2004–05 Wade Belak, Ashley Tait
- 2006–07 Dan Carlson
- 2007–08 Dan Carlson
- 2008–09 Jonathan Weaver, Adam Calder
- 2009–10 Peter Hirsch, Greg Chambers
- 2010–11 Luke Fulghum
- 2011–12 Dustin Wood
- 2015–16 Brian Stewart
- 2017–18 Marc-Olivier Vallerand
- 2019–20 Janne Laakkonen
- 2022–23 Nathanael Halbert
- 2024–25 Nick Seitz, Alessio Luciani
- 2025–26 Mat Robson

== Honoured players ==
- #12 (Canada) Steve Chartrand – Jersey retired for services to the club.
- #17 (United Kingdom) Russell Cowley – Jersey retired for services to the club.
- #25 (Canada) Adam Calder – Jersey retired for services to the club.
- #26 (United States) Dan Carlson - Jersey retired for services to the club.
- #55 (United Kingdom) Stephen Cooper – Jersey retired for services to British Ice Hockey.

== Notes ==
Preceded by Sheffield Steelers	Elite League Champions; 2004–05	Succeeded by Belfast Giants
Preceded by Belfast Giants	Elite League Champions; 2006–07, 2007–08	Succeeded by Sheffield Steelers
Preceded by Sheffield Steelers	Elite League Champions; 2009–10	Succeeded by Sheffield Steelers
Preceded by Sheffield Steelers	Playoff Champions; 2004–05, 2014–15	Succeeded by Newcastle Vipers
Preceded by Nottingham Panthers	Challenge Cup Winners; 2004–05	Succeeded by Cardiff Devils
Preceded by Cardiff Devils	Challenge Cup Winners; 2006–07	Succeeded by Nottingham Panthers
