= 2018–19 EIHL season =

- League: Elite Ice Hockey League
- Sport: Ice hockey
- Duration: Regular season: 8 September 2018 – 31 March 2019; Playoffs: 6–14 April 2019
- Matches: 330
- Total attendance: 949,539
- Average attendance: 2877.4

Regular season
- League: Belfast Giants
- Season MVP: Tyler Beskorowany (Belfast Giants)
- Top scorer: Darcy Murphy (Belfast Giants); (79 points)

Challenge Cup
- Winners: Belfast Giants

Conference
- Erhardt champions: Belfast Giants
- Erhardt runners-up: Cardiff Devils
- Gardiner champions: Glasgow Clan
- Gardiner runners-up: Dundee Stars
- Patton champions: Guildford Flames
- Patton runners-up: Coventry Blaze

Playoffs
- Champions: Cardiff Devils
- Runners-up: Belfast Giants
- Finals MVP: Ben Bowns (Cardiff Devils)

EIHL seasons
- 2017–18 2019–20

The 2018–19 EIHL season was the 16th season of the Elite Ice Hockey League. The regular season commenced on 8 September 2018 and ended on 31 March 2019, with the playoffs following in April 2019. The two-time reigning league champions were the Cardiff Devils, who won both the regular season and playoff titles in 2017–18.

The Devils were unable to make it three regular season titles in succession, after a season-long battle for the top position with the Belfast Giants. The league title came down to the final day of the regular season; the Coventry Blaze's 3–1 victory over the Devils at the Coventry Skydome handed the league title to the non-playing Giants, on a regulation wins (by 39 to 38) tie-break. It was the Giants' fourth regular season title, and first since 2013–14. The playoff final resulted in a matchup between the Devils and the Giants in Nottingham; the Devils achieved their second consecutive playoff title with a 2–1 victory on Gleason Fournier's game-winning goal, with 7:33 remaining.

== Teams ==
After having twelve teams for the 2017–18 season, the league reduced to eleven for the 2018–19 season. This was due to the Edinburgh Capitals – who had finished bottom of the league with just five wins – losing the rights to use the Murrayfield Ice Rink to a consortium that was led by David Hand, the brother of former Capital Tony Hand. Hand's consortium revived the Murrayfield Racers name, with a similarly-named franchise having been active between 1952 and 1996, and attempted to join the league in place of the Edinburgh Capitals, but this request was denied. As a result, the Murrayfield Racers joined the Scottish National League. The Hull Pirates, from the National Ice Hockey League, also considered an application to the Elite League, but ultimately did not take up this option.

The league featured three conferences, just as it did in 2017–18. The Gardiner Conference remained fully Scottish but became a three-team division, with the demise of the Edinburgh Capitals; the Dundee Stars, the Fife Flyers and the renamed Glasgow Clan (formerly Braehead) making up the trio. The two other conferences remained unchanged, with four teams in each. These were the Patton Conference, consisting of the Coventry Blaze, the Guildford Flames, the Manchester Storm and the Milton Keynes Lightning; and the Erhardt Conference, consisting of the four "Arena" teams: the Belfast Giants, the Cardiff Devils, the Nottingham Panthers and the Sheffield Steelers.

Team	City/Town	Conference	Arena	Capacity
Belfast Giants	Belfast	Erhardt	SSE Arena Belfast	7,200
Cardiff Devils	(Wales) Cardiff	Erhardt	Ice Arena Wales	3,100
Coventry Blaze	(England) Coventry	Patton	Coventry Skydome	3,000
Dundee Stars	(Scotland) Dundee	Gardiner	Dundee Ice Arena	2,400
Fife Flyers	(Scotland) Kirkcaldy	Gardiner	Fife Ice Arena	3,525
Glasgow Clan	(Scotland) Glasgow	Gardiner	Braehead Arena	4,000
Guildford Flames	(England) Guildford	Patton	Guildford Spectrum	2,001
Manchester Storm	(England) Altrincham	Patton	Altrincham Ice Dome	2,000
Milton Keynes Lightning	(England) Milton Keynes	Patton	Planet Ice Arena Milton Keynes	2,800
Nottingham Panthers	(England) Nottingham	Erhardt	National Ice Centre	7,500
Sheffield Steelers	(England) Sheffield	Erhardt	Sheffield Arena	8,500

== Standings ==
=== Overall ===
Each team played 60 games, playing each of the other ten teams six times: three times on home ice, and three times away from home. Points were awarded for each game, where two points are awarded for all victories, regardless of whether it was in regulation time or after overtime or shootout. One point was awarded for losing in overtime or shootout, and zero points for losing in regulation time. At the end of the regular season, the team that finished with the most points was crowned the league champion.

The league title came down to the final day of the regular season; the Coventry Blaze's 3–1 victory over the Cardiff Devils at the Coventry Skydome handed the league title to the non-playing Belfast Giants, on a regulation wins tie-break. It was the Giants' fourth regular season title, and first since 2013–14.

Pos	Team	Pld	W	OTW	OTL	L	GF	GA	GD	Pts	Qualification
1	Belfast Giants (C)	60	39	6	2	13	238	147	+91	92	Regular season champions Qualification to playoffs
2	Cardiff Devils (Q)	60	38	5	6	11	235	146	+89	92	Qualification to playoffs
3	Nottingham Panthers (Q)	60	23	6	12	19	183	181	+2	70	Qualification to playoffs
4	Glasgow Clan (Q)	60	28	3	5	24	202	186	+16	67	Qualification to playoffs
5	Guildford Flames (Q)	60	22	8	7	23	189	180	+9	67	Qualification to playoffs
6	Fife Flyers (Q)	60	21	9	6	24	188	204	−16	66	Qualification to playoffs
7	Sheffield Steelers (Q)	60	23	7	4	26	183	203	−20	64	Qualification to playoffs
8	Coventry Blaze (Q)	60	19	8	8	25	209	221	−12	62	Qualification to playoffs
9	Manchester Storm (E)	60	21	6	5	28	179	208	−29	59	
10	Dundee Stars (E)	60	16	7	12	25	169	201	−32	58	
11	Milton Keynes Lightning (E)	60	9	6	4	41	148	246	−98	34	

Source: Elite League
Rules for classification: 1) Points; 2) Games won in regulation time; 3) Number of games won; 4) Head-to-head results, ranked by criteria 1 to 3; 5) Fewest regulation losses; 6) Away game results, ranked by criteria 1 to 3; 7) Goals scored; 8) Goal difference; 9) Fewest penalty minutes; 10) Drawing of lots.
(C) Champion; (E) Eliminated; (Q) Qualified to the phase indicated

=== Erhardt Conference ===
Only intra-conference games counted towards the Erhardt Conference standings. Each team played the other three teams in the Conference six times, for a total of 18 matches. The Belfast Giants won the Conference for the third time, after the Cardiff Devils lost 5–4 against the Sheffield Steelers at Sheffield Arena on 16 March 2019.

Pos	Team	Pld	W	OTW	OTL	L	GF	GA	GD	Pts	Qualification
1	Belfast Giants (C)	18	8	4	1	5	68	50	+18	25	Conference champions
2	Cardiff Devils	18	8	2	2	6	65	51	+14	22	
3	Sheffield Steelers	18	6	2	1	9	51	68	−17	17	
4	Nottingham Panthers	18	5	1	5	7	48	63	−15	17	

Source: Elite League
Rules for classification: 1) Points; 2) Games won in regulation time; 3) Number of games won; 4) Head-to-head results, ranked by criteria 1 to 3; 5) Fewest regulation losses; 6) Away game results, ranked by criteria 1 to 3; 7) Goals scored; 8) Goal difference; 9) Fewest penalty minutes; 10) Drawing of lots.
(C) Champion

=== Gardiner Conference ===
Only intra-conference games count towards the Gardiner Conference standings. Each team plays the other two teams in the Conference six times, for a total of 12 matches. The Glasgow Clan won the Conference for the fifth time, after a 5–1 win over the Dundee Stars at Braehead Arena on 12 February 2019.

Pos	Team	Pld	W	OTW	OTL	L	GF	GA	GD	Pts	Qualification
1	Glasgow Clan (C)	12	7	2	1	2	44	27	+17	19	Conference champions
2	Dundee Stars	12	4	1	2	5	33	41	−8	12	
3	Fife Flyers	12	3	1	1	7	28	37	−9	9	

Source: Elite League
Rules for classification: 1) Points; 2) Games won in regulation time; 3) Number of games won; 4) Head-to-head results, ranked by criteria 1 to 3; 5) Fewest regulation losses; 6) Away game results, ranked by criteria 1 to 3; 7) Goals scored; 8) Goal difference; 9) Fewest penalty minutes; 10) Drawing of lots.
(C) Champion

=== Patton Conference ===
Only intra-conference games counted towards the Patton Conference standings. Each team played the other three teams in the Conference six times, for a total of 18 matches. The Guildford Flames won the Conference for the first time, after a 1–0 win over the Manchester Storm at the Guildford Spectrum on 17 February 2019.

Pos	Team	Pld	W	OTW	OTL	L	GF	GA	GD	Pts	Qualification
1	Guildford Flames (C)	18	9	5	1	3	77	48	+29	29	Conference champions
2	Coventry Blaze	18	6	3	4	5	75	73	+2	22	
3	Manchester Storm	18	8	0	2	8	55	65	−10	18	
4	Milton Keynes Lightning	18	4	1	2	11	50	71	−21	12	

Source: Elite League
Rules for classification: 1) Points; 2) Games won in regulation time; 3) Number of games won; 4) Head-to-head results, ranked by criteria 1 to 3; 5) Fewest regulation losses; 6) Away game results, ranked by criteria 1 to 3; 7) Goals scored; 8) Goal difference; 9) Fewest penalty minutes; 10) Drawing of lots.
(C) Champion

== Playoffs ==
=== Bracket ===
Quarter-finals (6–7 April)
1	Belfast Giants	5	7	12
8	Coventry Blaze	0	2	2
4	Glasgow Clan	3	0	3
5	Guildford Flames	2	5	7
(Pairings are reseeded after the first round)
3	Nottingham Panthers	3	3	6
6	Fife Flyers	3	0	3
2	Cardiff Devils	4	7	11
7	Sheffield Steelers	5	3	8

Semi-finals (13 April)
1	Belfast Giants	2
5	Guildford Flames	1
2	Cardiff Devils	9
3	Nottingham Panthers	4

Grand Final (14 April)
1	Belfast Giants	1
2	Cardiff Devils	2
Third place game (14 April)
3	Nottingham Panthers	9
5	Guildford Flames	5

=== Quarter-finals ===
The quarter-final schedule was announced after the conclusion of the final-day regular season matches.

==== (1) Belfast Giants vs. (8) Coventry Blaze ====
6 April 2019	Belfast Giants	5–0	Coventry Blaze	SSE Arena Belfast; Attendance: 6,744	Recap
Darcy Murphy (1) – 10:58		First period	No scoring
Jordan Smotherman (1) – 03:56; Chris Higgins (1; PPG) – 10:19		Second period	No scoring
Colin Shields (1) – 02:19; Jonathan Ferland (1) – 09:41		Third period	No scoring
Tyler Beskorowany (20 shots / 20 saves)		Goalie stats	Matt Hackett (37 shots / 32 saves)

7 April 2019	Coventry Blaze	2–7	Belfast Giants	Coventry Skydome; Attendance: 2,196	Recap
No scoring		First period	10:43 – Jonathan Ferland (2); 12:59 – Jim Vandermeer (1); 19:58 – Jordan Smotherman (2; PPG)
Shawn Pauly (1; PPG) – 06:27; Ben Lake (1) – 10:37		Second period	01:03 – Dustin Johner (1)
No scoring		Third period	01:14 – Jordan Smotherman (3); 18:03 – Jordan Smotherman (4); 19:31 – Blair Riley (1)
Jordan Hedley (45 shots / 38 saves)		Goalie stats	Tyler Beskorowany (26 shots / 24 saves)

Belfast Giants win 12–2 on aggregate.

==== (2) Cardiff Devils vs. (7) Sheffield Steelers ====
6 April 2019	Sheffield Steelers	5–4	Cardiff Devils	Sheffield Arena; Attendance: 6,296	Recap
Robert Dowd (1) – 04:26		First period	No scoring
Robert Dowd (2) – 09:10; Jordan Owens (1; PPG) – 11:28; John Armstrong (1; PPG) – 12:15		Second period	02:02 – Layne Ulmer (1)
John Armstrong (2; SHG) – 01:07		Third period	05:31 – Sean Bentivoglio (1); 14:20 – Joey Martin (1); 18:04 – Sean Bentivoglio (2; PPG)
Jackson Whistle (27 shots / 23 saves)		Goalie stats	Ben Bowns (20 shots / 15 saves)

7 April 2019	Cardiff Devils	7–3	Sheffield Steelers	Ice Arena Wales; Attendance: 3,100	Recap
Sean Bentivoglio (2) – 04:03; Joey Martin (2; PPG) – 17:46		First period	No scoring
Mark Richardson (1) – 07:37		Second period	01:43 – Jordan Owens (2; SHG)
Layne Ulmer (2; PPG) – 09:40; Matthew Myers (1) – 10:19; Joey Martin (3) – 13:21; Joey Martin (4; ENG) – 19:57		Third period	00:26 – Eric Neiley (1); 01:13 – Jordan Owens (3)
Ben Bowns (37 shots / 34 saves)		Goalie stats	Jackson Whistle (41 shots / 35 saves)

Cardiff Devils win 11–8 on aggregate.

==== (3) Nottingham Panthers vs. (6) Fife Flyers ====
6 April 2019	Fife Flyers	3–3	Nottingham Panthers	Fife Ice Arena; Attendance:	Recap
Bari McKenzie (1; PPG) – 03:01; Joe Basaraba (1) – 09:17; Mike Cazzola (1; PPG) – 16:59		First period	11:33 – Chris Stewart (1; PPG); 17:47 – Dylan Richard (1)
No scoring		Second period	No scoring
No scoring		Third period	14:04 – Brett Perlini (1)
Shane Owen (32 shots / 29 saves)		Goalie stats	Patrick Munson (38 shots / 35 saves)

7 April 2019	Nottingham Panthers	3–0	Fife Flyers	National Ice Centre; Attendance: 5,050	Recap
Dylan Richard (2) – 05:11		First period	No scoring
No scoring		Second period	No scoring
Dylan Richard (3; ENG) – 18:00; Robert Farmer (1; ENG) – 18:38		Third period	No scoring
Patrick Munson (23 shots / 23 saves)		Goalie stats	Shane Owen (30 shots / 29 saves)

Nottingham Panthers win 6–3 on aggregate.

==== (4) Glasgow Clan vs. (5) Guildford Flames ====
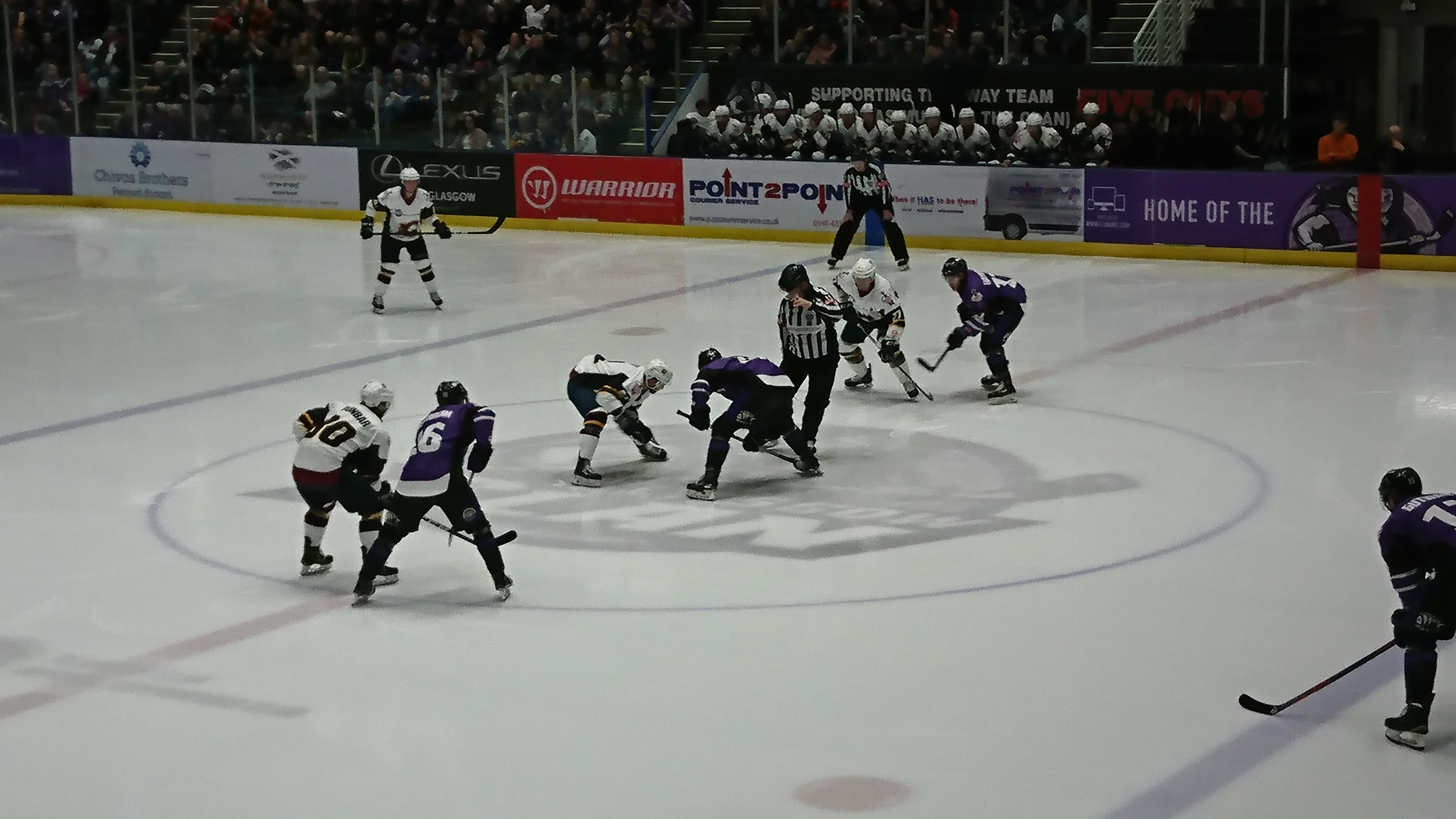
A face-off during the second leg at Braehead Arena

6 April 2019	Guildford Flames	2–3	Glasgow Clan	Guildford Spectrum; Attendance: 1,923	Recap
No scoring		First period	00:31 – Gerard Hanson (1); 18:59 – Rasmus Bjerrum (1)
No scoring		Second period	04:08 – Scott Pitt (1)
Jesse Craige (1; PPG) – 04:32; Ian Watters (1) – 06:35		Third period	No scoring
Chris Carrozzi (27 shots / 24 saves)		Goalie stats	Joel Rumpel (38 shots / 36 saves)

7 April 2019	Glasgow Clan	0–5	Guildford Flames	Braehead Arena; Attendance: 3,051	Recap
No scoring		First period	04:19 – Jamie Crooks (1); 08:15 – Ian Watters (2)
No scoring		Second period	19:07 – Evan Janssen (1)
No scoring		Third period	17:43 – Calle Ackered (1; ENG); 19:20 – T. J. Foster (1)
Joel Rumpel (29 shots / 25 saves)		Goalie stats	Travis Fullerton (32 shots / 32 saves)

Guildford Flames win 7–3 on aggregate.

=== Semi-finals ===
The schedule for the Playoff Finals weekend was announced after the conclusion of the quarter-final matches.

13 April 2019; 13:00	Belfast Giants	2–1 (0–0, 0–1, 2–0)	Guildford Flames	National Ice Centre, Nottingham; Attendance: 7,300

Game reference

Tyler Beskorowany
Goalies
Travis Fullerton
Referees:
Tom Darnell
Stefan Hogarth
Linesmen:
Ilya Kisil
Ryan Fraley

	0–1	24:13 – Ian Watters (3)
Jonathan Ferland (3) – 49:30	1–1
Patrick Dwyer (1) – 55:11	2–1

2 min
Penalties
0 min
25
Shots
18

13 April 2019; 17:00	Cardiff Devils	9–4 (4–0, 4–3, 1–1)	Nottingham Panthers	National Ice Centre, Nottingham; Attendance: 7,300

Game reference

Ben Bowns
Goalies
- Patrick Munson (40:00)
- Sam Gospel (20:00)
Referees:
Dean Smith
Andrew Dalton
Linesmen:
Lee Young
James Ions

Evan Mosey (1; PPG) – 07:00	1–0
Charles Linglet (1) – 11:34	2–0
Charles Linglet (2; PPG) – 17:55	3–0
Mark Richardson (2) – 19:00	4–0
	4–1	20:29 – Alex Guptill (1)
	4–2	23:03 – Mark Hurtubise (1)
Bryce Reddick (1) – 23:14	5–2
Stephen Dixon (1) – 26:16	6–2
	6–3	29:04 – Josh Tetlow (1)
Charles Linglet (3) – 33:34	7–3
Bryce Reddick (2) – 39:00	8–3
Charles Linglet (4) – 41:51	9–3
	9–4	46:04 – Jaynen Rissling (1; PPG)

12 min
Penalties
4 min
36
Shots
34

=== Third-place match ===
14 April 2019; 12:00	Nottingham Panthers	9–5 (4–0, 3–2, 2–3)	Guildford Flames	National Ice Centre, Nottingham; Attendance: 7,300

Game reference

- Patrick Munson (20:00)
- Sam Gospel (40:00)
Goalies
- Chris Carrozzi (20:00)
- Mike Will (40:00)
Referees:
Tom Darnell
Stefan Hogarth
Linesmen:
Ryan Fraley
James Ions

Mark Hurtubise (2) – 07:23	1–0
Alexandre Bolduc (1) – 10:07	2–0
Josh Tetlow (2) – 11:06	3–0
Alex Guptill (2) – 12:28	4–0
	4–1	22:46 – Jamie Crooks (2)
Mark Hurtubise (3) – 29:13	5–1
Alex Guptill (3) – 30:49	6–1
Mark Hurtubise (4) – 35:51	7–1
	7–2	37:11 – Kruise Reddick (1)
Guillaume Lépine (1) – 46:42	8–2
	8–3	48:29 – Kevin King (1)
Justin Kovacs (1) – 50:24	9–3
	9–4	56:20 – Evan Janssen (2; PPG)
	9–5	59:46 – Erik Lindhagen (1)

2 min
Penalties
2 min
40
Shots
43

=== Grand Final ===
14 April 2019; 16:00	Belfast Giants	1–2 (0–1, 0–0, 1–1)	Cardiff Devils	National Ice Centre, Nottingham; Attendance: 7,300

Game reference

Tyler Beskorowany
Goalies
Ben Bowns
Referees:
Dean Smith
Andrew Dalton
Linesmen:
Ilya Kisil
Lee Young

	0–1	16:32 – Mike Hedden (1)
Kevin Raine (1) – 49:56	1–1
	1–2	52:27 – Gleason Fournier (1)

8 min
Penalties
12 min
35
Shots
22

== Regular season statistics ==
=== Scoring leaders ===
The following players led the league in points at the conclusion of the regular season.

Player	Team	GP	G	A	Pts	PIM
Darcy Murphy	Belfast Giants	58	39	40	79	20
Ben Lake	Coventry Blaze	60	34	43	77	103
Charles Linglet	Cardiff Devils	59	21	54	75	26
Mike Hammond	Manchester Storm	53	18	57	75	16
Kyle Baun	Belfast Giants	60	28	43	71	30
Gleason Fournier	Cardiff Devils	60	24	47	71	28
Blair Riley	Belfast Giants	60	33	36	69	68
Matt Beca	Glasgow Clan	60	26	43	69	18
Joey Martin	Cardiff Devils	60	30	38	68	38
Tim Crowder	Coventry Blaze	60	27	41	68	32

=== Leading goaltenders ===
The following goaltenders led the league in goals against average at the conclusion of the regular season, while playing at least 1140 minutes.

Player	Team	GP	TOI	W	L	GA	SO	SV%	GAA
Tyler Beskorowany	Belfast Giants	54	3221:51	42	11	121	3	.921	2.25
Ben Bowns	Cardiff Devils	60	3572:00	43	14	138	8	.916	2.32
Chris Carrozzi	Guildford Flames	34	2035:07	15	16	93	2	.906	2.74
Michael Garnett	Nottingham Panthers	47	2784:29	22	22	135	2	.908	2.91
Travis Fullerton	Guildford Flames	26	1541:13	15	11	76	4	.910	2.96

== Playoff statistics ==
=== Scoring leaders ===
The following players led the league in points at the conclusion of the playoffs.

Player	Team	GP	G	A	Pts	PIM
Charles Linglet	Cardiff Devils	4	4	4	8	2
Joey Martin	Cardiff Devils	4	4	3	7	0
Mark Hurtubise	Nottingham Panthers	4	4	3	7	4
Jordan Smotherman	Belfast Giants	4	4	2	6	2
Sean Bentivoglio	Cardiff Devils	4	3	3	6	8
Bryce Reddick	Cardiff Devils	4	2	3	5	0
Kevin Raine	Belfast Giants	4	1	4	5	0
Chris Stewart	Nottingham Panthers	4	1	4	5	0
Alex Guptill	Nottingham Panthers	4	3	1	4	0
John Armstrong	Sheffield Steelers	2	2	2	4	0

=== Leading goaltenders ===
The following goaltenders led the league in goals against average at the conclusion of the playoffs, provided they played 60 minutes.

Player	Team	GP	TOI	W	L	GA	SO	SV%	GAA
Travis Fullerton	Guildford Flames	2	119:18	1	1	2	1	.965	1.01
Tyler Beskorowany	Belfast Giants	4	238:12	3	1	5	1	.942	1.26
Shane Owen	Fife Flyers	2	119:25	0	1	4	0	.935	2.01
Joel Rumpel	Glasgow Clan	2	117:13	1	1	6	0	.910	3.07
Ben Bowns	Cardiff Devils	4	240:00	3	1	13	0	.897	3.25
