= Kevin Shattenkirk =

American ice hockey player (born 1989)

- Shattenkirk with the Boston Bruins in 2023
- Born: January 29, 1989 (age 37) New Rochelle, New York, U.S.
- Height: 6 ft 0 in (183 cm)
- Weight: 209 lb (95 kg; 14 st 13 lb)
- Position: Defense
- Shot: Right
- Played for: Colorado Avalanche; St. Louis Blues; TPS; Washington Capitals; New York Rangers; Tampa Bay Lightning; Anaheim Ducks; Boston Bruins
- National team: United States
- NHL draft: 14th overall, 2007; Colorado Avalanche
- Playing career: 2010–2024

Kevin Michael Shattenkirk (born January 29, 1989) is an American former professional ice hockey defenseman. He played in the National Hockey League (NHL) for the Colorado Avalanche, St. Louis Blues, Washington Capitals, New York Rangers, Tampa Bay Lightning, Anaheim Ducks and Boston Bruins. He was drafted in the first round, 14th overall, at the 2007 NHL entry draft by the Avalanche and made his NHL debut with them in 2010. Shattenkirk won the Stanley Cup as a member of the Lightning in 2020.

== Playing career ==
Shattenkirk grew up in New Rochelle, New York where he attended Iona Prep Lower School. As a youth, he played in the 2002 Quebec International Pee-Wee Hockey Tournament with the New Jersey Devils minor ice hockey team.

=== Amateur ===
Shattenkirk was drafted 14th overall in the 2007 NHL entry draft by the Colorado Avalanche. He played youth hockey with the New Jersey Devils Youth Hockey Club before attending The Brunswick School in Greenwich, Connecticut. He was drafted by the USA Hockey National Team Development Program, and committed to Boston University of the NCAA's Hockey East conference, along with fellow 2007 Avalanche draft pick Colby Cohen.

After a solid freshman season with the Terriers in 2007–08, in which he was named to the Hockey East All-Freshman Team, Shattenkirk helped take the Terriers to the Frozen Four tournament in 2008–09. After being named in the NCAA Second All-American Team, Shattenkirk went on to help Boston University take the National Championship 4–3 against Miami University, assisting in the overtime, title-winning Colby Cohen goal.

Shattenkirk was named as co-captain, along with Brian Strait, of the Terriers for the 2009–10 season on April 21, 2009. However, after Strait turned professional, Shattenkirk became the sole captain of the Terriers and the first junior sole captain since the 1961–62 season. In 38 games with the Terriers, while focused more attentively to defense, he matched his sophomore goal total with 7 and posted 29 points to be named to the Inside College Hockey Preseason All-American and All-College Hockey News Preseason Second Teams. After defeat in the Hockey East semi-finals to the University of Maine, on April 3, 2010, Shattenkirk (along with Colby Cohen) was signed to three-year, entry-level contract with the Colorado Avalanche.

=== Professional ===
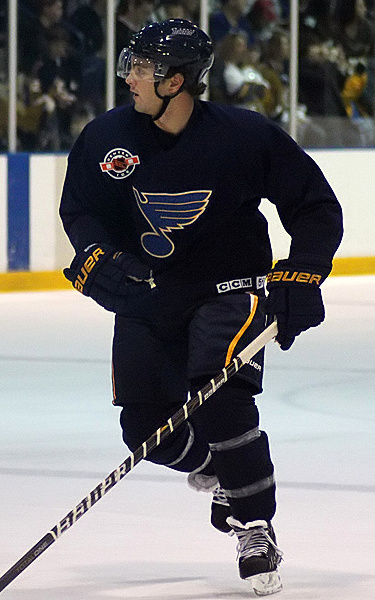
Shattenkirk practicing with the Blues in 2011

==== Colorado Avalanche ====
On April 5, 2010, Shattenkirk was signed to an amateur try-out contract with the Avalanche's American Hockey League (AHL) affiliate, the Lake Erie Monsters, to conclude the 2009–10 season. On April 7, 2010, he made his professional debut, recording an assist and a shootout goal in a 5–4 victory over the Abbotsford Heat.

On November 4, 2010, Colorado recalled Shattenkirk from Lake Erie and made his NHL debut in a home game against the Vancouver Canucks that same day. Shattenkirk was one of 12 rookies selected to participate in the 2011 NHL All-Star festivities in Raleigh, North Carolina.

==== St. Louis Blues ====
On February 19, 2011, in a swap of four former first-rounders, Shattenkirk, Chris Stewart and a conditional second-round pick were traded to the St. Louis Blues in exchange for Erik Johnson, Jay McClement and a conditional first-round pick. Later that day, Shattenkirk made his home debut with the Blues at the Scottrade Center, recording an assist in a decisive 9–3 victory over the Anaheim Ducks.

With the NHL lockout effectively delaying the start to the 2012–13 season, on November 26, 2012, Shattenkirk signed a lockout contract in Finland, joining Blues teammate Kris Russell with HC TPS of the SM-liiga. He played in 12 games before the labor dispute was solved, scoring two goals and six points for TPS.

On June 26, 2013, Shattenkirk signed a four-year, $17 million extension with St. Louis.

==== Washington Capitals ====
In the final year of his contract, during the 2016–17 season, the Blues were unable to work out an extension with Shattenkirk as he approached free agency. On February 27, 2017, prior to the trade deadline, Shattenkirk was traded (alongside Pheonix Copley) to the Washington Capitals in exchange for Zach Sanford, Brad Malone, a 2017 first-round draft pick and a conditional second-round draft pick in 2019. Shattenkirk left the Blues having played in 425 games and collecting 258 points, placing fifth all-time amongst defensemen in franchise history.

==== New York Rangers ====
On July 1, 2017, Shattenkirk signed a four-year, $26.65 million contract with the New York Rangers. Shattenkirk had been connected to the Rangers via rumors for months leading up to his free agency, which further heated up following a June 23 trade in which New York traded away Derek Stepan, clearing up cap space. On January 19, 2018, it was announced Shattenkirk would have surgery to repair a torn meniscus in his left knee and that he would be out of the lineup indefinitely. It was later revealed he had torn the meniscus during training camp and had played through the first half of the season with it before opting for surgery. Even though he was initially expected to be able to return for the end of the regular season and for the 2018 Stanley Cup playoffs, the Rangers would fall out of playoff contention and eventually opted to shut down Shattenkirk for the season.

On July 31, 2019, Shattenkirk's contract was bought out by the New York Rangers after a disappointing 2018–19 season when he registered just 2 goals and 28 points in 73 games.

==== Tampa Bay Lightning ====
Shattenkirk signed with the Tampa Bay Lightning on a one-year, $1.75 million deal for the 2019–20 season. As a member of the Lightning, Shattenkirk would win the Stanley Cup, recording 3 goals and 10 assists for 13 points in the playoffs.

==== Anaheim Ducks ====
On October 9, 2020, Shattenkirk left the Lightning as a free agent and was signed to a three-year, $11.7 million contract with the Anaheim Ducks.

Adding a veteran presence on the rebuilding Ducks blueline, Shattenkirk added 4 goals and 23 points through 75 games during the 2022–23 season, his final year under contract.

==== Boston Bruins and retirement ====
As a free agent from the Ducks, Shattenkirk was signed to a one-year, $1.05 million contract with the Boston Bruins on July 1, 2023.

Returning back to the city where he played college hockey, Shattenkirk provided a veteran presence on Boston's young blue line. Despite inconsistent playing time, Shattenkirk presence remained stable in the locker room. On March 30, 2024, Shattenkirk became an unlikely hero for the Bruins, scoring the game winning shootout goal in the fifth round, lifting them past his former team, the Washington Capitals. Shattenkirk was fined on April 14, 2024, for unsportsmanlike conduct. Shattenkirk was placed in the lineup to start for the Bruins first round playoff series against the Toronto Maple Leafs. His experience and leadership proved to be valuable to the Bruins before game seven of the series, when Shattenkirk made an inspiring speech to the team, who would go on to win 2–1 in overtime. Shattenkirk did not play in any of the six games of Boston's second round series loss against the Florida Panthers.

After entering the 2024–25 season as an unsigned free agent, Shattenkirk announced his retirement on December 10, 2024.

== International play ==
Medal record

Representing United States

Ice hockey

IIHF U18 Championships
Silver medal – second place	2007 Tampere	

Shattenkirk, entrenched in the US National Team Development Program, first represented the United States in the 2006 World U-17 Hockey Challenge, helping collect silver. The following year, as captain of the under-18 development program, Shattenkirk was selected to the 2007 IIHF World U18 Championships. He again contributed to the United States winning silver, gaining selection to the All-Star Team and named the Tournament's Best Defenseman.

Shattenkirk was named to the United States national team for the 2009 World Junior Championships. Serving as an alternate captain and with expectations of helping the U.S. to a medal, Shattenkirk led all tournament defenseman in scoring with nine points and, despite a disappointing fifth-place team finish, was named as one of Team USA's top three players and praised for strong play by USA Hockey Executive Jim Johannson.

Following the completion of his rookie NHL season, Shattenkirk was chosen in his first men's tournament to represent the United States at the 2011 World Championships in Slovakia. In the opening game of the Championships, Shattenkirk scored his first full international goal in a 5–1 victory over Austria on April 30, 2011. Shattenkirk finished with three points in seven games before finishing in eighth place after losing in the quarter-finals to the Czech Republic, 4–0, on May 11, 2011.

On January 1, 2014, Shattenkirk was named to the United States national team for the 2014 Winter Olympics, along with St. Louis teammates David Backes and T. J. Oshie.

== Career statistics ==
=== Regular season and playoffs ===
			Regular season					Playoffs
Season	Team	League	GP	G	A	Pts	PIM	GP	G	A	Pts	PIM
2003–04	Brunswick School	HS-CT	26	4	11	15	—	—	—	—	—	—
2004–05	Brunswick School	HS-CT	22	10	18	28	—	—	—	—	—	—
2005–06	U.S. NTDP U17	USDP	13	4	4	8	4	—	—	—	—	—
2005–06	U.S. NTDP U18	NAHL	28	6	9	15	17	12	3	7	10	10
2006–07	U.S. NTDP U18	USDP	43	8	19	27	36	—	—	—	—	—
2006–07	U.S. NTDP U18	NAHL	14	5	8	13	26	—	—	—	—	—
2007–08	Boston University	HE	40	4	17	21	38	—	—	—	—	—
2008–09	Boston University	HE	43	7	21	28	40	—	—	—	—	—
2009–10	Boston University	HE	38	7	22	29	38	—	—	—	—	—
2009–10	Lake Erie Monsters	AHL	3	0	2	2	0	—	—	—	—	—
2010–11	Lake Erie Monsters	AHL	10	0	0	0	10	—	—	—	—	—
2010–11	Colorado Avalanche	NHL	46	7	19	26	20	—	—	—	—	—
2010–11	St. Louis Blues	NHL	26	2	15	17	16	—	—	—	—	—
2011–12	St. Louis Blues	NHL	81	9	34	43	60	9	1	1	2	6
2012–13	TPS	SM-l	12	2	4	6	22	—	—	—	—	—
2012–13	St. Louis Blues	NHL	48	5	18	23	20	6	0	2	2	6
2013–14	St. Louis Blues	NHL	81	10	35	45	38	6	1	4	5	2
2014–15	St. Louis Blues	NHL	56	8	36	44	52	6	0	8	8	2
2015–16	St. Louis Blues	NHL	72	14	30	44	51	20	2	9	11	19
2016–17	St. Louis Blues	NHL	61	11	31	42	37	—	—	—	—	—
2016–17	Washington Capitals	NHL	19	2	12	14	10	13	1	5	6	6
2017–18	New York Rangers	NHL	46	5	18	23	44	—	—	—	—	—
2018–19	New York Rangers	NHL	73	2	26	28	20	—	—	—	—	—
2019–20	Tampa Bay Lightning	NHL	70	8	26	34	38	25	3	10	13	6
2020–21	Anaheim Ducks	NHL	55	2	13	15	28	—	—	—	—	—
2021–22	Anaheim Ducks	NHL	82	8	27	35	36	—	—	—	—	—
2022–23	Anaheim Ducks	NHL	75	4	23	27	56	—	—	—	—	—
2023–24	Boston Bruins	NHL	61	6	18	24	18	6	0	1	1	0
NHL totals			952	103	381	484	544	91	8	40	48	47

=== International ===
Year	Team	Event	GP	G	A	Pts	PIM
2006	United States	U17	6	3	2	5	2
2007	United States	U18	7	1	4	5	2
2009	United States	WJC	6	1	8	9	4
2011	United States	WC	7	1	2	3	6
2014	United States	OG	6	0	3	3	0
Junior totals			19	5	14	19	8
Senior totals			13	1	5	6	6

== Awards and honors ==
Award	Year
College
All-Hockey East Rookie Team	2007–08
All-Hockey East Second Team	2008–09
AHCA East Second-Team All-American	2008–09
NHL
All-Star Game	2015
Stanley Cup champion	2020
International
WJC18 First Team All-Star	2007

Awards and achievements
Preceded by Chris Stewart	Colorado Avalanche first-round draft pick 2007	Succeeded by Matt Duchene
