= Jay McClement =

Canadian ice hockey player (born 1983)

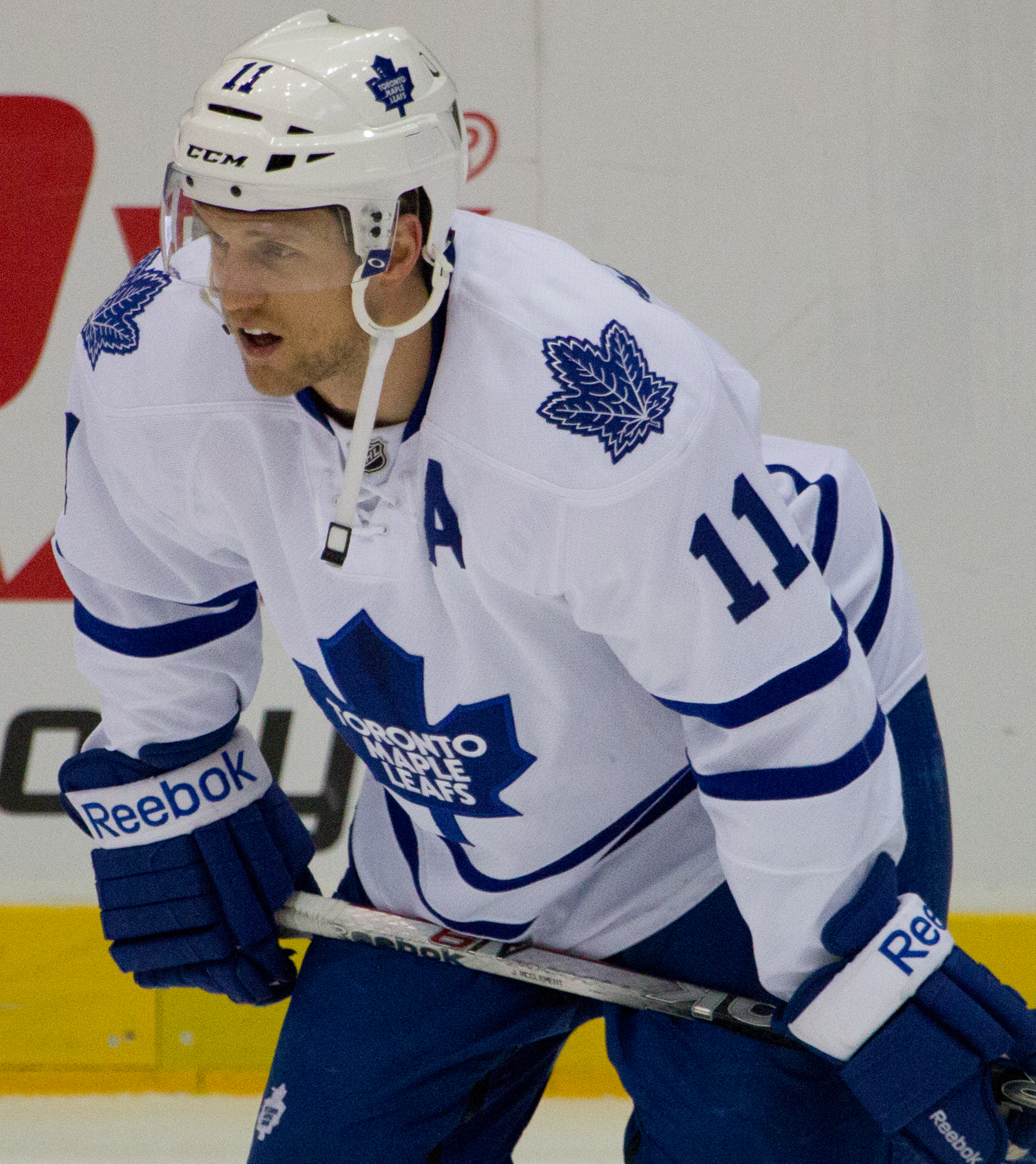
- McClement with the Toronto Maple Leafs in 2013
- Born: March 2, 1983 (age 43) Kingston, Ontario, Canada
- Height: 6 ft 1 in (185 cm)
- Weight: 201 lb (91 kg; 14 st 5 lb)
- Position: Centre
- Shot: Left
- Played for: St. Louis Blues; Colorado Avalanche; Toronto Maple Leafs; Carolina Hurricanes; EHC Olten
- National team: Canada
- NHL draft: 57th overall, 2001; St. Louis Blues
- Playing career: 2003–2018

Jay McClement (born March 2, 1983) is a Canadian former professional ice hockey centre. He was originally selected by the St. Louis Blues in the second round, 57th overall, in 2001, playing for the team before later joining the Colorado Avalanche, Toronto Maple Leafs and Carolina Hurricanes in his NHL career. Currently, he is a pro scout for the Pittsburgh Penguins.

== Playing career ==
McClement began his major junior career during the 1999–00 season with the Brampton Battalion. In four seasons with the club, McClement recorded 182 points in 235 games.

During the 2001 NHL entry draft, McClement was drafted in the second round, 57th overall by the St. Louis Blues. At the conclusion of the 2002–03 season, McClement skated in one game for the Blues' American Hockey League affiliate, the Worcester IceCats.

McClement began his professional career during the 2003–04 season, skating in 69 games with the IceCats.

During the 2005–06 season, McClement made his debut with the Blues, appearing in 67 games. In his fourth game for the club on October 11, 2005, McClement scored his first career goal on a penalty shot against Nikolai Khabibulin in a 4–1 loss to the Chicago Blackhawks. McClement finished the season with 6 goals and 27 points in 67 games.

McClement was a member of Team Canada at the 2007 IIHF World Championship that won the gold medal in a 4–2 victory over Finland in Moscow.

On May 29, 2009, the Blues re-signed McClement to a three-year, $4.35 million contract worth $1.45 million annually.

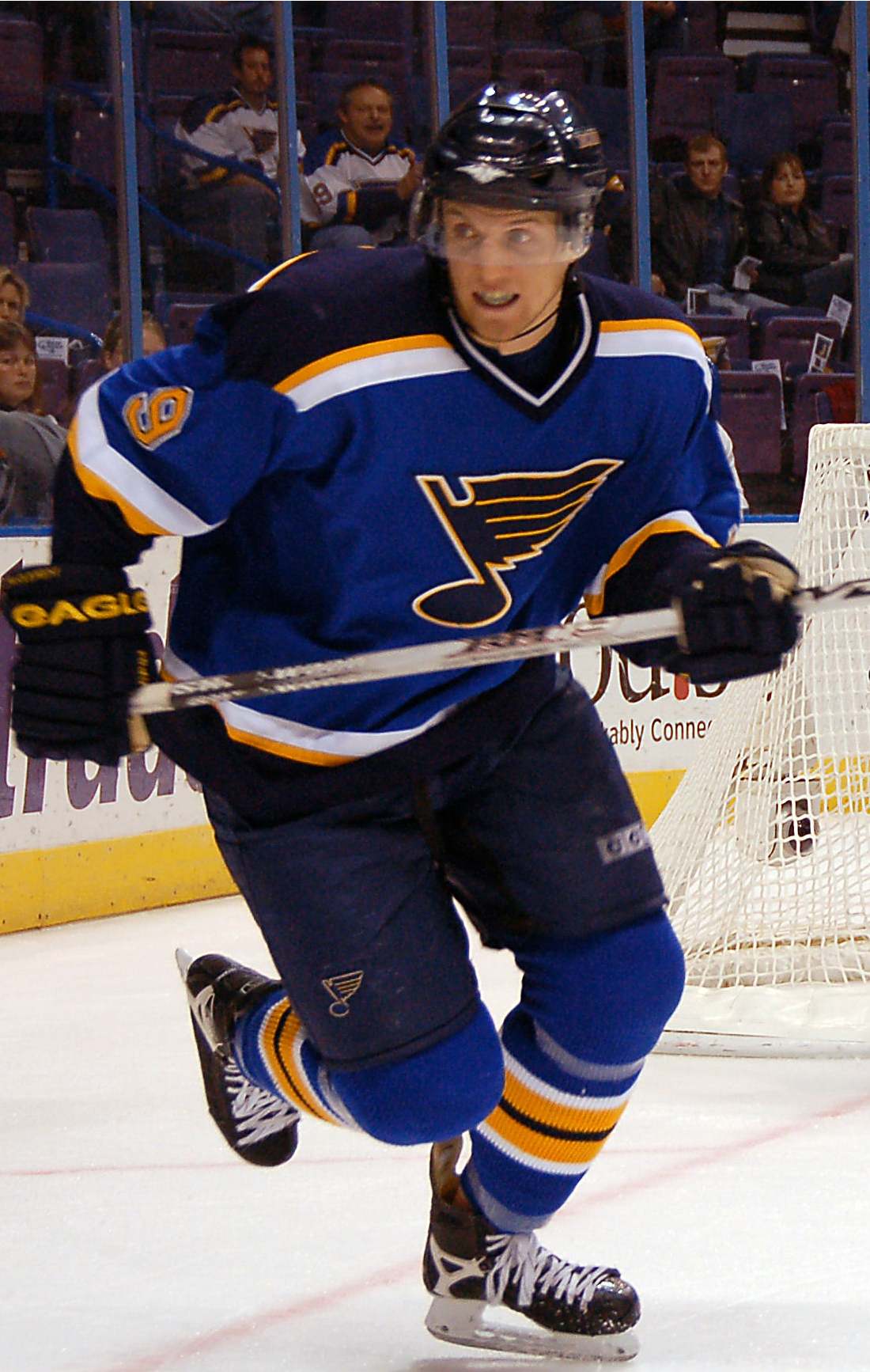
McClement with the St. Louis Blues.

On October 30, 2010, during the 2010–11 season, McClement scored his first career NHL hat-trick in a 4–3 shootout victory over the Atlanta Thrashers. On February 19, 2011, he was traded to the Colorado Avalanche, along with Erik Johnson and a conditional first-round draft pick, in exchange for Chris Stewart, Kevin Shattenkirk and a conditional second-round pick. Later that day, McClement made his Avalanche debut at the SAP Center (then called HP Pavilion at San Jose) in a 4–0 defeat to the San Jose Sharks.

On July 1, 2012, McClement left the Avalanche organization as a free agent and signed a two-year, $3 million contract with the Toronto Maple Leafs.

On July 2, 2014, McClement signed a one-year, $1 million contract with the Carolina Hurricanes. During his first year, the Hurricanes signed McClement to a two-year, $2.4 million contract extension on March 1, 2015, worth $1.2 million annually.

After his third season with the club, the Hurricanes chose not to re-sign McClement at the end of his contract, making him a free agent. Un-signed over the summer, on August 25, 2017, McClement signed a professional tryout contract with the defending champions, the Pittsburgh Penguins. Following training camp and pre-season, McClement was released by the Penguins without a contract offer. On October 27, 2017, McClement agreed to his first contract abroad, signing an optional two-year deal with Swiss second tier club, EHC Olten of the Swiss League.

== Career statistics ==
=== Regular season and playoffs ===
| | | | Regular season | | | | | Playoffs |
| Season | Team | League | GP | G | A | Pts | PIM | GP | G | A | Pts | PIM |
|---|---|---|---|---|---|---|---|---|---|---|---|---|
| 1997–98 | Kingston Voyageurs | OPJHL | 48 | 3 | 8 | 11 | 15 | — | — | — | — | — |
| 1998–99 | Kingston Voyageurs | OPJHL | 51 | 25 | 28 | 53 | 34 | — | — | — | — | — |
| 1999–2000 | Brampton Battalion | OHL | 63 | 13 | 16 | 29 | 34 | 6 | 0 | 4 | 4 | 8 |
| 2000–01 | Brampton Battalion | OHL | 66 | 30 | 19 | 49 | 61 | 9 | 4 | 2 | 6 | 10 |
| 2001–02 | Brampton Battalion | OHL | 61 | 26 | 29 | 55 | 43 | — | — | — | — | — |
| 2002–03 | Brampton Battalion | OHL | 45 | 22 | 27 | 49 | 37 | 11 | 3 | 4 | 7 | 11 |
| 2002–03 | Worcester IceCats | AHL | — | — | — | — | — | 1 | 0 | 0 | 0 | 0 |
| 2003–04 | Worcester IceCats | AHL | 69 | 12 | 13 | 25 | 20 | 10 | 0 | 3 | 3 | 0 |
| 2004–05 | Worcester IceCats | AHL | 79 | 17 | 34 | 51 | 45 | — | — | — | — | — |
| 2005–06 | St. Louis Blues | NHL | 67 | 6 | 21 | 27 | 30 | — | — | — | — | — |
| 2005–06 | Peoria Rivermen | AHL | 11 | 5 | 4 | 9 | 4 | 4 | 0 | 2 | 2 | 2 |
| 2006–07 | St. Louis Blues | NHL | 81 | 8 | 28 | 36 | 55 | — | — | — | — | — |
| 2007–08 | St. Louis Blues | NHL | 81 | 9 | 13 | 22 | 26 | — | — | — | — | — |
| 2008–09 | St. Louis Blues | NHL | 82 | 12 | 14 | 26 | 29 | 4 | 0 | 0 | 0 | 4 |
| 2009–10 | St. Louis Blues | NHL | 82 | 11 | 18 | 29 | 22 | — | — | — | — | — |
| 2010–11 | St. Louis Blues | NHL | 56 | 6 | 10 | 16 | 18 | — | — | — | — | — |
| 2010–11 | Colorado Avalanche | NHL | 24 | 1 | 3 | 4 | 12 | — | — | — | — | — |
| 2011–12 | Colorado Avalanche | NHL | 80 | 10 | 7 | 17 | 31 | — | — | — | — | — |
| 2012–13 | Toronto Maple Leafs | NHL | 48 | 8 | 9 | 17 | 11 | 7 | 0 | 0 | 0 | 0 |
| 2013–14 | Toronto Maple Leafs | NHL | 81 | 4 | 6 | 10 | 32 | — | — | — | — | — |
| 2014–15 | Carolina Hurricanes | NHL | 82 | 7 | 14 | 21 | 17 | — | — | — | — | — |
| 2015–16 | Carolina Hurricanes | NHL | 77 | 3 | 8 | 11 | 24 | — | — | — | — | — |
| 2016–17 | Carolina Hurricanes | NHL | 65 | 5 | 3 | 8 | 18 | — | — | — | — | — |
| 2017–18 | EHC Olten | SL | 32 | 6 | 16 | 22 | 24 | 16 | 1 | 1 | 2 | 10 |
| NHL totals | | | 906 | 90 | 154 | 244 | 325 | 11 | 0 | 0 | 0 | 4 |

=== International ===
| Year | Team | Event | Result | GP | G | A | Pts | PIM |
|---|---|---|---|---|---|---|---|---|
| 2000 | Canada Ontario | U17 | 2nd place, silver medalist(s) | 6 | 1 | 1 | 2 | 8 |
| 2000 | Canada | U18 | 1st place, gold medalist(s) | 3 | 1 | 0 | 1 | 2 |
| 2002 | Canada | WJC | 2nd place, silver medalist(s) | 7 | 1 | 1 | 2 | 2 |
| 2003 | Canada | WJC | 2nd place, silver medalist(s) | 6 | 1 | 2 | 3 | 4 |
| 2007 | Canada | WC | 1st place, gold medalist(s) | 9 | 2 | 2 | 4 | 4 |
| Junior totals | | | | 22 | 4 | 4 | 8 | 16 |
| Senior totals | | | | 9 | 2 | 2 | 4 | 4 |

== Awards and honors ==
| Award | Year |
|---|---|
OHL
| CHL Top Prospects Game | 2001 |
| Face-Off Award | 2003 |
