= Erik Lindhagen =

Swedish ice hockey player (born 1987)

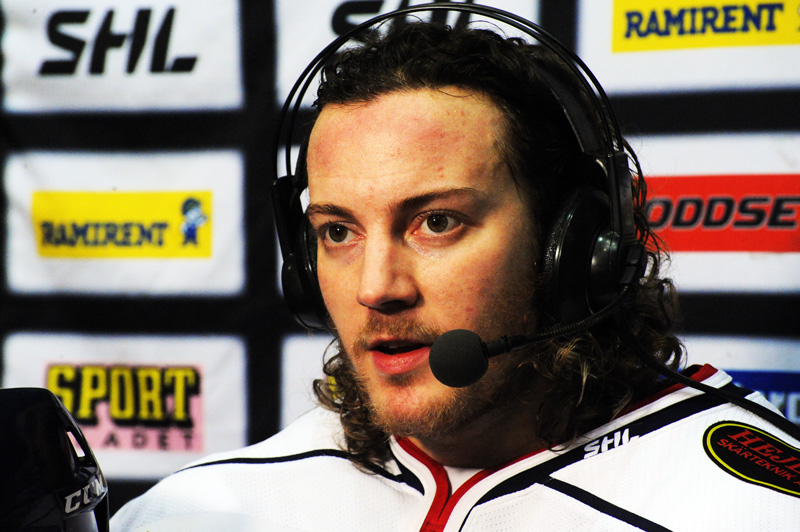
- Born: October 2, 1987 (age 38) Linköping, Sweden
- Height: 5 ft 10 in (178 cm)
- Weight: 174 lb (79 kg; 12 st 6 lb)
- Position: Centre
- Shot: Left
- GET-ligaen team Former teams: Grüner Ishockey; Guildford Flames; Nottingham Panthers; Linköpings HC; Södertälje SK; Timrå IK
- Playing career: 2006–2022

Erik Lindhagen (born October 2, 1987) is a Swedish professional ice hockey centre who currently plays for Grüner Ishockey in Norway's GET-ligaen. Lindhagen previously iced with Guildford Flames of the Elite Ice Hockey League. He has previously played for Linköpings HC of the Elitserien and Nottingham Panthers.

== Career statistics ==
| | | | Regular season | | | | | Playoffs |
| Season | Team | League | GP | G | A | Pts | PIM | GP | G | A | Pts | PIM |
|---|---|---|---|---|---|---|---|---|---|---|---|---|
| 2002–03 | Linköping HC U16 | U16 SM | 5 | 2 | 4 | 6 | 0 | — | — | — | — | — |
| 2003–04 | Linköping HC J18 | J18 Allsvenskan | 9 | 1 | 3 | 4 | 6 | — | — | — | — | — |
| 2003–04 | Linköping HC J20 | J20 SuperElit | 17 | 2 | 1 | 3 | 8 | — | — | — | — | — |
| 2003–04 | Ljungsbro HF | Division 3 | 4 | 5 | 3 | 8 | — | — | — | — | — | — |
| 2004–05 | Linköping HC J18 | J18 Elit | 14 | 6 | 14 | 20 | 43 | — | — | — | — | — |
| 2004–05 | Linköping HC J20 | J20 SuperElit | 32 | 2 | 8 | 10 | 12 | — | — | — | — | — |
| 2005–06 | Linköping HC J18 | J18 Elit | 5 | 0 | 7 | 7 | 6 | — | — | — | — | — |
| 2005–06 | Linköping HC J20 | J20 SuperElit | 37 | 7 | 21 | 28 | 44 | 7 | 2 | 1 | 3 | 8 |
| 2005–06 | Linköping HC | Elitserien | 2 | 0 | 0 | 0 | 0 | 6 | 0 | 0 | 0 | 0 |
| 2006–07 | Linköping HC J20 | J20 SuperElit | 40 | 13 | 18 | 31 | 56 | 5 | 0 | 3 | 3 | 14 |
| 2006–07 | Linköping HC | Elitserien | 7 | 1 | 0 | 1 | 0 | — | — | — | — | — |
| 2007–08 | Växjö Lakers HC | HockeyAllsvenskan | 43 | 4 | 11 | 15 | 14 | 3 | 0 | 0 | 0 | 0 |
| 2007–08 | Tingsryds AIF | Division 1 | 1 | 0 | 0 | 0 | 2 | — | — | — | — | — |
| 2008–09 | Växjö Lakers HC | HockeyAllsvenskan | 45 | 12 | 15 | 27 | 60 | 8 | 1 | 6 | 7 | 4 |
| 2009–10 | Linköping HC J20 | J20 SuperElit | 1 | 0 | 0 | 0 | 0 | — | — | — | — | — |
| 2009–10 | Linköping HC | Elitserien | 13 | 0 | 1 | 1 | 6 | — | — | — | — | — |
| 2009–10 | Växjö Lakers HC | HockeyAllsvenskan | 39 | 7 | 25 | 32 | 52 | 10 | 1 | 5 | 6 | 14 |
| 2010–11 | Linköping HC | Elitserien | 55 | 10 | 11 | 21 | 14 | 7 | 0 | 0 | 0 | 2 |
| 2011–12 | Linköping HC | Elitserien | 55 | 4 | 5 | 9 | 22 | — | — | — | — | — |
| 2012–13 | Linköping HC | Elitserien | 53 | 2 | 4 | 6 | 24 | 10 | 1 | 0 | 1 | 6 |
| 2013–14 | Linköping HC | SHL | 47 | 2 | 5 | 7 | 18 | — | — | — | — | — |
| 2013–14 | VIK Västerås HK | HockeyAllsvenskan | 6 | 1 | 0 | 1 | 2 | 10 | 0 | 2 | 2 | 2 |
| 2014–15 | Södertälje SK | HockeyAllsvenskan | 50 | 4 | 13 | 17 | 28 | — | — | — | — | — |
| 2015–16 | Timrå IK | HockeyAllsvenskan | 41 | 1 | 6 | 7 | 24 | 5 | 0 | 0 | 0 | 0 |
| 2016–17 | Nottingham Panthers | EIHL | 52 | 4 | 16 | 20 | 32 | 2 | 0 | 2 | 2 | 0 |
| 2017–18 | Nottingham Panthers | EIHL | 56 | 7 | 10 | 17 | 26 | 4 | 0 | 2 | 2 | 0 |
| 2018–19 | Guildford Flames | EIHL | 58 | 5 | 12 | 17 | 38 | 3 | 0 | 0 | 0 | 0 |
| 2019–20 | Guildford Flames | EIHL | 38 | 4 | 8 | 12 | 12 | — | — | — | — | — |
| 2020–21 | Grüner Ishockey | Norway | 17 | 3 | 6 | 9 | 18 | — | — | — | — | — |
| 2021–22 | Kitzbüheler EC | AlpsHL | 33 | 6 | 15 | 21 | 34 | — | — | — | — | — |
| 2021–22 | Kitzbüheler EC | Austria2 | — | — | — | — | — | 1 | 0 | 0 | 0 | 0 |
| SHL (Elitserien) totals | | | 232 | 19 | 26 | 45 | 84 | 23 | 1 | 0 | 1 | 8 |
| HockeyAllsvenskan totals | | | 224 | 29 | 70 | 99 | 180 | 36 | 2 | 13 | 15 | 20 |
| EIHL totals | | | 204 | 20 | 46 | 66 | 108 | 9 | 0 | 4 | 4 | 0 |
