= Jordan Owens (ice hockey) =

Canadian ice hockey player (born 1986)

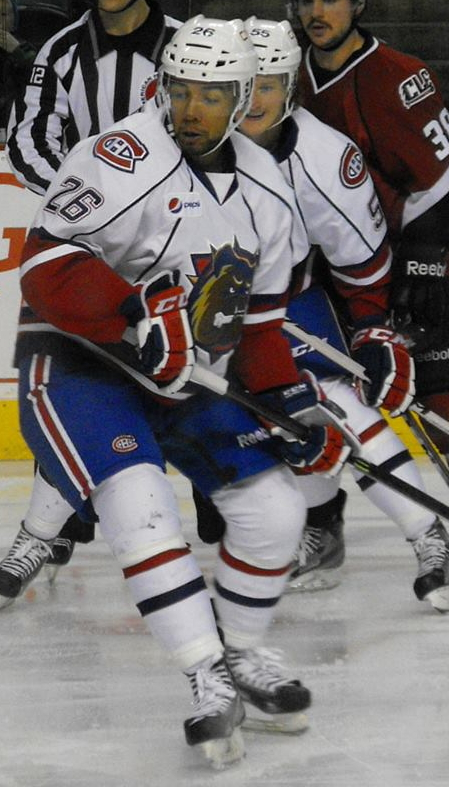
- Born: May 1, 1986 (age 40) Toronto, Ontario, Canada
- Height: 6 ft 0 in (183 cm)
- Weight: 180 lb (82 kg; 12 st 12 lb)
- Position: Left wing
- Shot: Left
- AIHL team Former teams: Melbourne Mustangs; Hartford Wolf Pack; Grand Rapids Griffins; SønderjyskE; Hamilton Bulldogs; WSV Sterzing Broncos; Fischtown Pinguins; Sheffield Steelers
- NHL draft: Undrafted
- Playing career: 2007–2020

Jordan Owens (born May 1, 1986) is a former Canadian professional ice hockey left winger. He previously played with the Melbourne Mustangs of the Australian Ice Hockey League (AIHL).

== Career ==
On June 12, 2007, Owens was signed as an undrafted free agent to an entry-level contract with the New York Rangers. In his fourth season within the Rangers organization on March 3, 2010, he was traded to the Detroit Red Wings in exchange for Kris Newbury.

On August 1, 2014, Owen opted to venture overseas for a second time in his career in agreeing to a one-year contract with WSV Sterzing Broncos of the Italian Elite.A.

After a stint in the DEL with Fischtown Pinguins, Owens moved to the Sheffield Steelers of the United Kingdom's Elite Ice Hockey League in July 2018.

After retiring from hockey, Owens worked as a developer in Toronto. He currently works as a freelance software engineer.

== Career statistics ==
			Regular season					Playoffs
Season	Team	League	GP	G	A	Pts	PIM	GP	G	A	Pts	PIM
2004–05	Mississauga IceDogs	OHL	66	11	14	25	45	5	0	0	0	2
2005–06	Mississauga IceDogs	OHL	66	26	28	54	47	—	—	—	—	—
2006–07	Mississauga IceDogs	OHL	60	32	42	74	51	5	1	2	3	6
2006–07	Hartford Wolf Pack	AHL	2	0	0	0	0	6	0	0	0	9
2007–08	Hartford Wolf Pack	AHL	41	7	7	14	44	5	0	0	0	0
2007–08	Charlotte Checkers	ECHL	20	3	10	13	28	2	0	0	0	0
2008–09	Hartford Wolf Pack	AHL	67	12	25	37	66	6	1	2	3	0
2009–10	Hartford Wolf Pack	AHL	50	6	13	19	53	—	—	—	—	—
2009–10	Grand Rapids Griffins	AHL	17	1	4	5	22	—	—	—	—	—
2010–11	Grand Rapids Griffins	AHL	60	6	14	20	101	—	—	—	—	—
2011–12	Connecticut Whale	AHL	74	5	11	16	61	9	1	1	2	8
2012–13	SønderjyskE	DEN	31	13	18	31	39	16	6	3	9	37
2013–14	South Carolina Stingrays	ECHL	18	7	11	18	10	4	1	2	3	2
2013–14	Hamilton Bulldogs	AHL	26	1	5	6	30	—	—	—	—	—
2014–15	WSV Sterzing Broncos	ITA	40	28	32	60	40	5	3	0	3	14
2015–16	Fischtown Penguins	DEL2	45	15	22	37	44	7	1	2	3	6
2016–17	Fischtown Penguins	DEL	52	10	17	27	32	6	2	1	3	2
2017–18	Fischtown Penguins	DEL	52	8	29	18	44	7	1	2	3	4
2018–19	Sheffield Steelers	EIHL	51	10	16	26	66	2	3	0	3	2
2019	Melbourne Mustangs	AIHL	23	9	18	27	12	—	—	—	—	—
2019–20	Brantford Blast	ACH	11	9	7	16	8	6	5	2	7	2
AHL totals			337	38	79	117	377	26	2	3	5	17

== Personal life ==
In late 2020, during the COVID-19 pandemic, Owens moved from Toronto, Ontario to Saint John, New Brunswick alongside his wife and daughter due to better housing affordability. Owens and his family runs the YouTube channel "A Tribe Called Owens" where they share their experience living in New Brunswick.
