= Josh Tetlow =

English ice hockey player

- Born: 12 January 1998 (age 28) Lewisham, London, England
- Height: 1.98 m (6 ft 6 in)
- Weight: 103 kg (227 lb; 16 st 3 lb)
- Position: Defence
- Shot: Left
- EIHL team Former teams: Nottingham Panthers; Bees IHC; Peterborough Phantoms; JHT Kalajoki; Rovaniemen Kiekko
- National team: Great Britain
- NHL draft: Undrafted
- Playing career: 2014–2026

Joshua Tetlow (born 12 January 1998) is an English professional ice hockey player who is a defenceman for the Nottingham Panthers of the Elite Ice Hockey League (EIHL).

== Playing career ==
After coming through the Bracknell youth setup, he made his Bees IHC debut in the 2014/15 season. He signed for EIHL team Nottingham Panthers on a two-way deal with the Bees in the 2017/18 season. During his time in Nottingham, Tetlow would win the 2021 Elite Series.

On 13 May 2022, the Panthers announced that Tetlow would be leaving them to play in Europe for the 2022/23 season. It was subsequently announced that he had signed a one-year contract with Finnish second tier side Rovaniemen Kiekko (RoKi). Tetlow returned to Nottingham for the 2023/24 season.

== International play ==
He represented Great Britain at the 2021, 2022 and 2024 IIHF World Championship.

== Career statistics ==
=== Regular season and playoffs ===
			Regular season					Playoffs
Season	Team	League	GP	G	A	Pts	PIM	GP	G	A	Pts	PIM
2014–15	Bracknell Hornets	NIHL 1	24	0	5	5	8	2	0	0	0	0
2014–15	Bracknell Bees	EPIHL	13	0	0	0	4	—	—	—	—	—
2015–16	Bracknell Bees	EPIHL	54	0	4	4	32	—	—	—	—	—
2016–17	Bracknell Bees	EPIHL	47	1	4	5	155	—	—	—	—	—
2017–18	Bracknell Bees	NIHL 1	22	1	6	7	20	2	0	0	0	0
2017–18	Nottingham Panthers	EIHL	29	1	2	3	4	3	0	1	1	0
2018–19	Nottingham Panthers	EIHL	60	0	4	4	39	3	1	0	1	2
2019–20	Peterborough Phantoms	NIHL	9	0	2	2	2	—	—	—	—	—
2019–20	Nottingham Panthers	EIHL	42	0	2	2	7	—	—	—	—	—
2020–21	JHT Kalajoki	Suomi-sarja	14	0	3	3	6	—	—	—	—	—
2020–21	Nottingham Panthers	EIHL Series	16	1	0	1	18	—	—	—	—	—
2021–22	Nottingham Panthers	EIHL	54	3	4	7	30	2	0	0	0	0
2022–23	RoKi	Mestis	45	2	7	9	18	10	0	0	0	2
2023–24	Nottingham Panthers	EIHL	23	0	6	6	55	—	—	—	—	—
2024–25	Nottingham Panthers	EIHL	53	1	6	7	47	4	0	0	0	0
2025–26	Nottingham Panthers	EIHL	52	0	5	5	38	2	0	0	0	0
EIHL totals			313	5	29	34	220	14	1	1	2	2

=== International ===
Year	Team	Event	GP	G	A	Pts	PIM
2017	Great Britain U20	WJC-20 (D1B)	5	0	0	0	2
2018	Great Britain U20	WJC-20 (D2A)	5	0	0	0	0
2021	Great Britain	WC	7	0	0	0	0
2022	Great Britain	WC	7	0	1	1	2
2023	Great Britain	WC (D1A)	5	0	1	1	0
2024	Great Britain	WC	4	0	1	1	0
2024	Great Britain	OGQ	3	0	0	0	2
2025	Great Britain	WC (D1A)	5	0	1	1	0
2026	Great Britain	WC	6	0	0	0	0
Junior totals			10	0	0	0	2
Senior totals			37	0	4	4	4
