= Charles Linglet =

Canadian-Belarusian ice hockey player

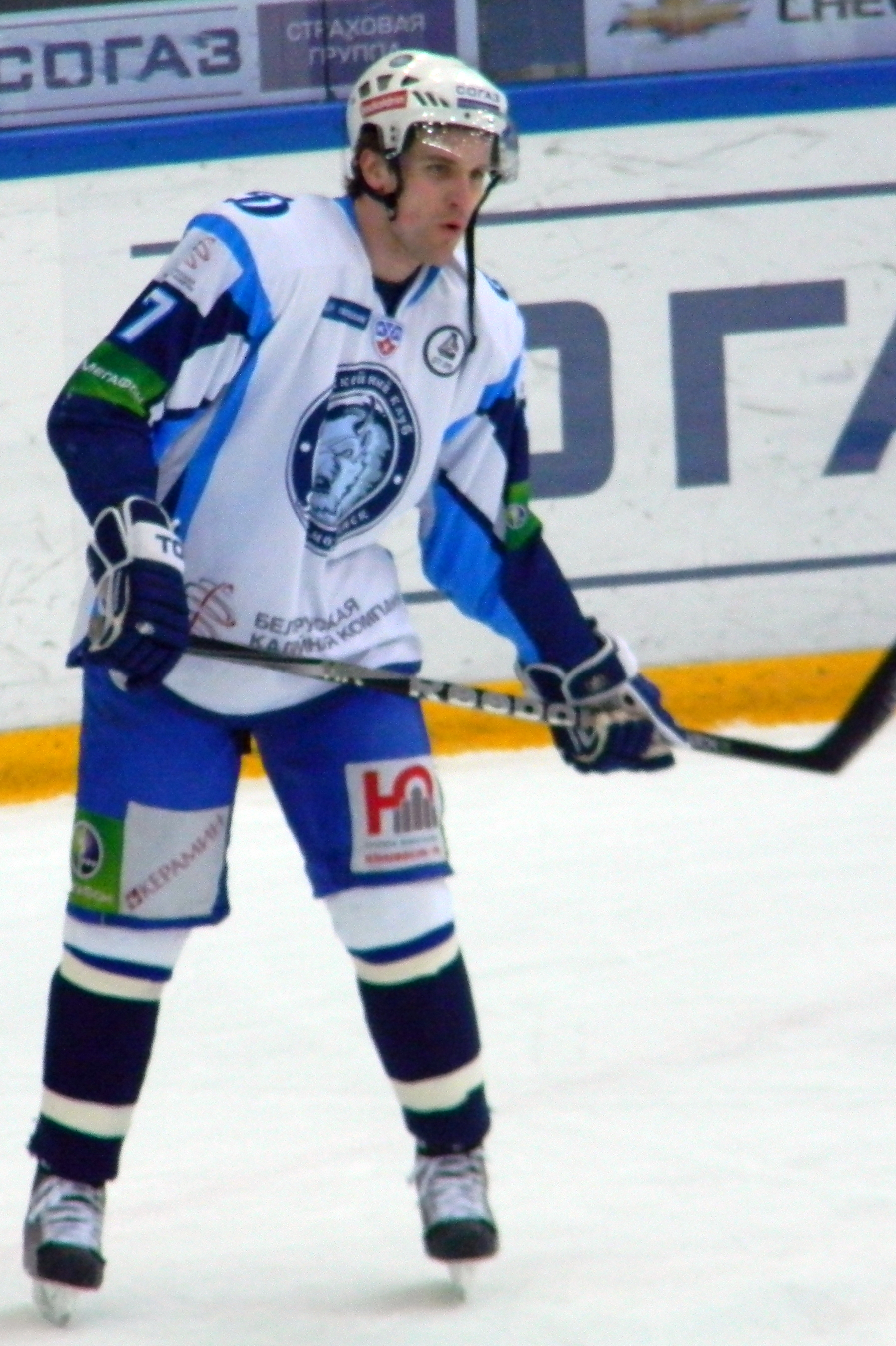
- Born: June 22, 1982 (age 44) Montreal, Quebec, Canada
- Height: 6 ft 2 in (188 cm)
- Weight: 212 lb (96 kg; 15 st 2 lb)
- Position: Left wing
- Shot: Left
- Played for: Edmonton Oilers; Torpedo Nizhny Novgorod; Dinamo Minsk; HC Lugano; KHL Medveščak Zagreb; Tappara; Eisbären Berlin; Cardiff Devils
- National team: Belarus
- NHL draft: Undrafted
- Playing career: 2003–2020; 2024

Charles Linglet (born June 22, 1982) is a Canadian-Belarusian former professional ice hockey Forward who played in the National Hockey League (NHL) with the Edmonton Oilers.

== Playing career ==
After having spent time with various American Hockey League (AHL) and ECHL teams, Linglet made his debut in the National Hockey League (NHL) for the Edmonton Oilers in a game against the Dallas Stars on April 2, 2010. Linglet spent most of the 2009–10 season playing for the Springfield Falcons of the American Hockey League (AHL). He finished the season with 74 points in 75 games, and was named to the AHL's Second All-Star Team.

In 2010, he moved to the Kontinental Hockey League (KHL), joining Torpedo Nizhny Novgorod. After one year with the Torpedo team, he was signed by HC Dinamo Minsk before the 2011–12 KHL season.

On February 26, 2013, Linglet accepted Belarusian citizenship. During the 2012–13 KHL season season, Linglet left HC Dinamo Minsk and joined HC Lugano of the National League A (NLA), completing the rest of the season in Switzerland.

On May 29, 2013, Linglet agreed a return to the KHL, signing a one-year deal with Croatian club, KHL Medveščak Zagreb. In May 2014, he moved back to Dinamo Minsk, where he played until November 2016, followed by a short stint at Finnish Liiga side, Tappara.

On January 31, 2017, he was signed by German club, Eisbären Berlin of the Deutsche Eishockey Liga (DEL).

In 2018, Linglet moved to the UK to sign for Elite Ice Hockey League (EIHL) side, the Cardiff Devils for the 2018–19 EIHL season. The Devils missed out on the league title to Belfast Giants after a final day defeat to Coventry Blaze but made amends by winning the 2019 play-off title. Linglet was the league's third top-scorer in his first season. Linglet signed a one-year extension on June 16, 2019, to remain in Cardiff. The COVID-19 pandemic brought Linglet's time with the Devils to a premature end, with the league cancelling the remainder of the 2019–20 EIHL season. Cardiff were top of the table at the time of the cancellation and Linglet played his final game as a member of the Devils on March 8, 2020, in a 4–3 Challenge Cup final loss to the Sheffield Steelers.

After an almost four-year hiatus from playing, Linglet, now 41 years old, was signed by the ECHL's Florida Everblades on January 10, 2024, to play in the 2023-24 ECHL season. His time with the Everblades lasted only a week before he was released on January 17. He played in two games, registering one assist. This was, to date, Linglet's last professional season as a player.

== Personal life ==
Linglet is married to his wife, Michelle. The couple have two sons together.

== Career statistics ==
=== Regular season and playoffs ===
| | | | Regular season | | | | | Playoffs |
| Season | Team | League | GP | G | A | Pts | PIM | GP | G | A | Pts | PIM |
|---|---|---|---|---|---|---|---|---|---|---|---|---|
| 1999–00 | Baie-Comeau Drakkar | QMJHL | 64 | 14 | 20 | 34 | 13 | 6 | 3 | 3 | 6 | 4 |
| 2000–01 | Baie-Comeau Drakkar | QMJHL | 70 | 21 | 34 | 55 | 61 | 11 | 2 | 2 | 4 | 10 |
| 2001–02 | Baie-Comeau Drakkar | QMJHL | 72 | 52 | 71 | 123 | 34 | 5 | 1 | 3 | 4 | 2 |
| 2002–03 | Baie-Comeau Drakkar | QMJHL | 47 | 21 | 27 | 48 | 35 | 12 | 3 | 8 | 11 | 18 |
| 2003–04 | Utah Grizzlies | AHL | 7 | 0 | 0 | 0 | 2 | — | — | — | — | — |
| 2003–04 | Alaska Aces | ECHL | 62 | 20 | 35 | 55 | 61 | 7 | 2 | 5 | 7 | 4 |
| 2004–05 | Alaska Aces | ECHL | 72 | 28 | 34 | 62 | 44 | 15 | 6 | 10 | 16 | 14 |
| 2005–06 | Peoria Rivermen | AHL | 38 | 14 | 7 | 21 | 10 | — | — | — | — | — |
| 2005–06 | Las Vegas Wranglers | ECHL | 16 | 5 | 9 | 14 | 15 | 12 | 5 | 4 | 9 | 20 |
| 2006–07 | Peoria Rivermen | AHL | 73 | 31 | 29 | 60 | 30 | — | — | — | — | — |
| 2007–08 | Peoria Rivermen | AHL | 80 | 24 | 42 | 66 | 65 | — | — | — | — | — |
| 2008–09 | Peoria Rivermen | AHL | 37 | 1 | 8 | 9 | 23 | — | — | — | — | — |
| 2008–09 | Springfield Falcons | AHL | 21 | 7 | 9 | 16 | 6 | — | — | — | — | — |
| 2009–10 | Springfield Falcons | AHL | 75 | 19 | 55 | 74 | 36 | — | — | — | — | — |
| 2009–10 | Edmonton Oilers | NHL | 5 | 0 | 0 | 0 | 2 | — | — | — | — | — |
| 2010–11 | Torpedo Nizhny Novgorod | KHL | 53 | 20 | 25 | 45 | 30 | — | — | — | — | — |
| 2011–12 | Dinamo Minsk | KHL | 51 | 12 | 14 | 26 | 75 | 4 | 1 | 0 | 1 | 0 |
| 2012–13 | Dinamo Minsk | KHL | 22 | 3 | 4 | 7 | 24 | — | — | — | — | — |
| 2012–13 | HC Lugano | NLA | 5 | 2 | 0 | 2 | 0 | 3 | 1 | 0 | 1 | 0 |
| 2013–14 | KHL Medveščak Zagreb | KHL | 45 | 9 | 18 | 27 | 34 | 4 | 0 | 4 | 4 | 2 |
| 2014–15 | Dinamo Minsk | KHL | 54 | 22 | 36 | 58 | 59 | 5 | 2 | 2 | 4 | 2 |
| 2015–16 | Dinamo Minsk | KHL | 16 | 2 | 6 | 8 | 18 | — | — | — | — | — |
| 2016–17 | Dinamo Minsk | KHL | 23 | 0 | 8 | 8 | 12 | — | — | — | — | — |
| 2016–17 | Tappara | Liiga | 11 | 2 | 3 | 5 | 4 | — | — | — | — | — |
| 2016–17 | Eisbären Berlin | DEL | 8 | 2 | 2 | 4 | 2 | 13 | 3 | 5 | 8 | 2 |
| 2017–18 | Dinamo Minsk | KHL | 55 | 6 | 11 | 17 | 38 | — | — | — | — | — |
| 2018–19 | Cardiff Devils | EIHL | 59 | 21 | 54 | 75 | 26 | 4 | 4 | 4 | 8 | 2 |
| 2019–20 | Cardiff Devils | EIHL | 38 | 7 | 26 | 33 | 28 | — | — | — | — | — |
| 2023–24 | Florida Everblades | ECHL | 2 | 0 | 1 | 1 | 0 | — | — | — | — | — |
| KHL totals | | | 319 | 74 | 122 | 196 | 290 | 13 | 3 | 6 | 9 | 4 |
| NHL totals | | | 5 | 0 | 0 | 0 | 2 | — | — | — | — | — |

=== International ===
| Year | Team | Event | Result | GP | G | A | Pts | PIM |
|---|---|---|---|---|---|---|---|---|
| 2016 | Belarus | WC | 12th | 7 | 1 | 5 | 6 | 4 |
| 2016 | Belarus | OGQ | DNQ | 3 | 0 | 2 | 2 | 0 |
| 2017 | Belarus | WC | 13th | 7 | 0 | 4 | 4 | 2 |
| 2018 | Belarus | WC | 15th | 6 | 1 | 1 | 2 | 0 |
| Senior totals | | | | 23 | 2 | 12 | 14 | 6 |
