= Jonathan Ferland =

Canadian professional ice hockey forward

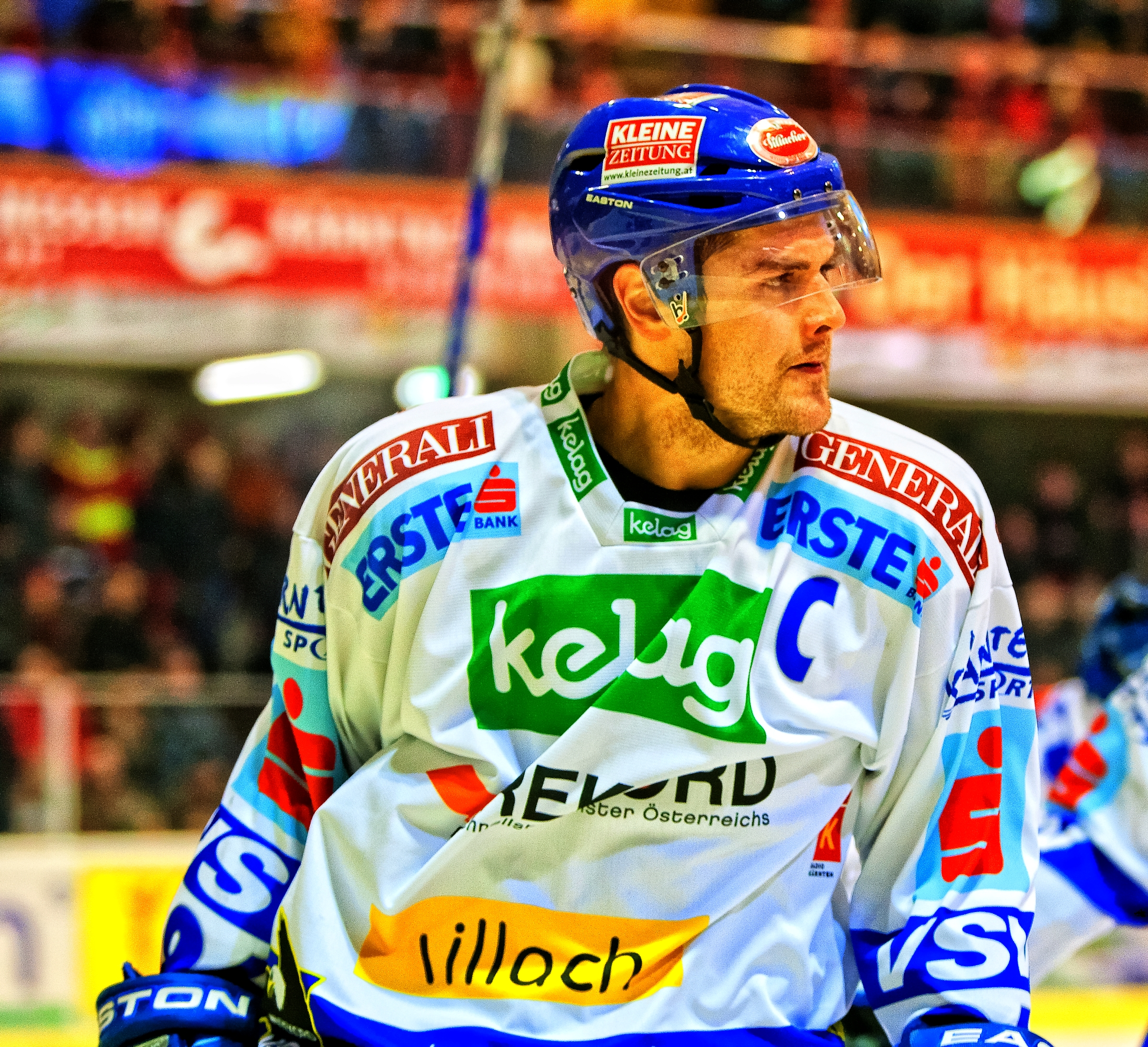
- Ferland with EC VSV in 2011
- Born: February 9, 1983 (age 43) Quebec City, Quebec, Canada
- Height: 6 ft 2 in (188 cm)
- Weight: 214 lb (97 kg; 15 st 4 lb)
- Position: Right wing
- Shoots: Right
- LNAH team Former teams: Saint-Georges Cool FM 103.5; Montreal Canadiens; EC VSV; Vienna Capitals; Belfast Giants
- NHL draft: 212th overall, 2002; Montreal Canadiens
- Playing career: 2003–present

Jonathan Nicolas Camil Ferland (born February 9, 1983) is a Canadian professional ice hockey forward for Saint-Georges Cool FM 103.5 in the Ligue Nord-Américaine de Hockey (LNAH). Before this, Ferland played two seasons with the Belfast Giants in the Elite Ice Hockey League (EIHL). Ferland previously played for and captained the Vienna Capitals in the Austrian Hockey League (EBEL). He currently coaches the St Patrick's High School U17Major and the RSEQ Hockey Team in Quebec City Canada

== Playing career ==
Ferland was born in Quebec City, Quebec. As a youth, he played in the 1996 and 1997 Quebec International Pee-Wee Hockey Tournaments with a minor ice hockey team from Beauce, Quebec.

Ferland was the property of National Hockey League's Montreal Canadiens and assigned to the American Hockey League's Hamilton Bulldogs for five seasons. He was drafted by the Canadiens in the 2002 NHL entry draft (7th round, 212 overall) making his NHL debut on January 3, 2006. Previously, he had played for the QMJHL's Moncton Wildcats and Acadie-Bathurst Titan.

He scored his first career goal in his NHL debut, a 6–4 loss on January 3, 2006, to Pittsburgh's Marc-André Fleury.

After 5 seasons, Ferland left the Bulldogs and Canadiens organization moving abroad to sign with EC VSV of the Erste Bank Eishockey Liga on May 13, 2008.

Ferland played three seasons with Villacher SV, including captaining the club in his final season in 2010–11 season, before signing with league rivals the Vienna Capitals on July 8, 2011.

After six seasons in Vienna, Ferland left as a free agent to sign a one-year deal with Northern Irish club, the Belfast Giants of the EIHL on July 12, 2017.

== Career statistics ==
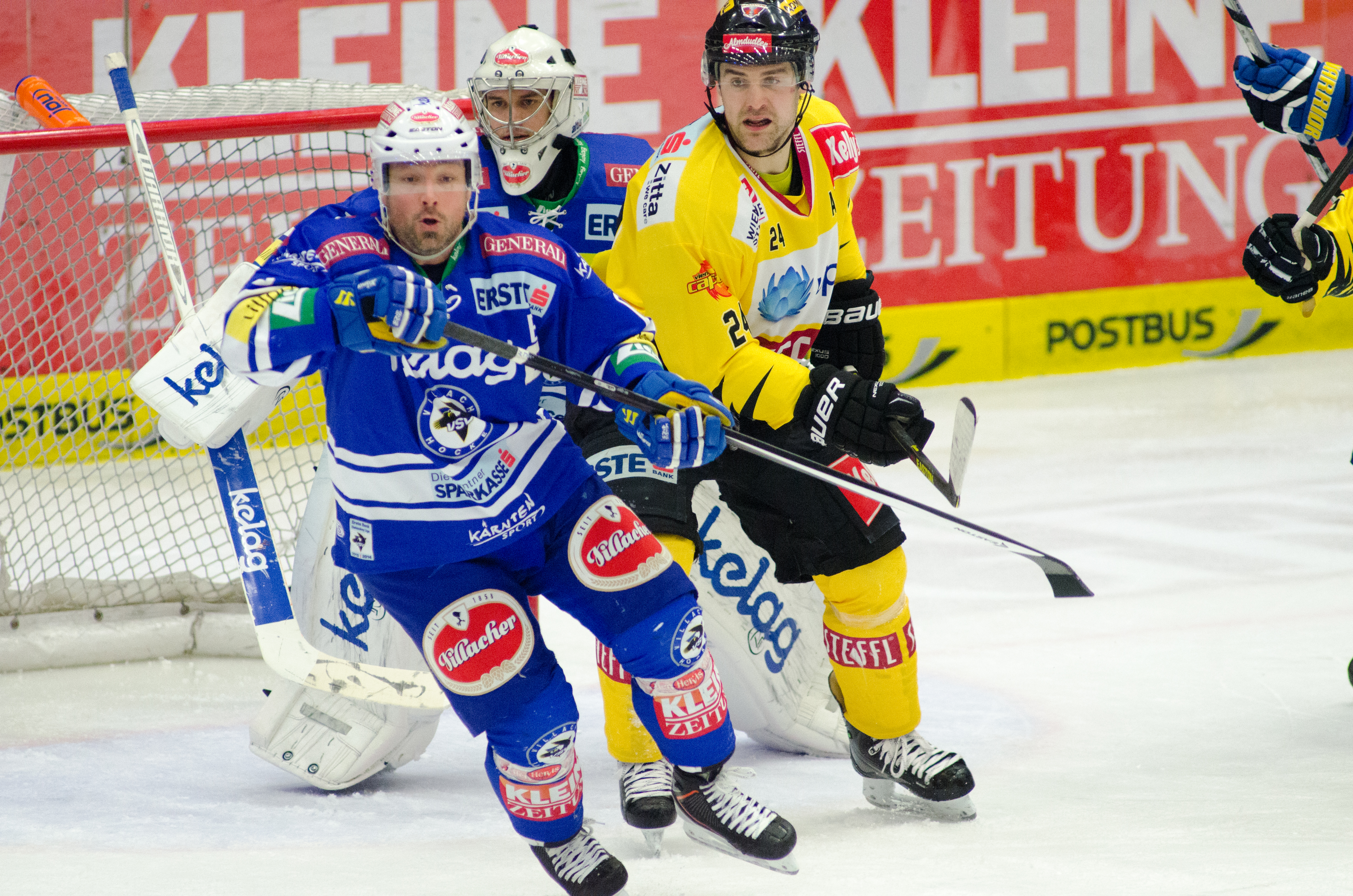
Ferland (R) with the Capitals against his former club.

| | | | Regular season | | | | | Playoffs |
| Season | Team | League | GP | G | A | Pts | PIM | GP | G | A | Pts | PIM |
|---|---|---|---|---|---|---|---|---|---|---|---|---|
| 1998–99 | Lévis Commandeurs | QMAAA | 42 | 18 | 17 | 35 | 50 | — | — | — | — | — |
| 1999–2000 | Moncton Wildcats | QMJHL | 52 | 3 | 6 | 9 | 21 | 11 | 0 | 1 | 1 | 0 |
| 2000–01 | Acadie–Bathurst Titan | QMJHL | 70 | 17 | 11 | 28 | 135 | 13 | 0 | 4 | 4 | 47 |
| 2001–02 | Acadie–Bathurst Titan | QMJHL | 55 | 28 | 46 | 74 | 104 | 10 | 2 | 10 | 12 | 8 |
| 2002–03 | Acadie–Bathurst Titan | QMJHL | 68 | 45 | 44 | 89 | 94 | 11 | 4 | 5 | 9 | 16 |
| 2003–04 | Hamilton Bulldogs | AHL | 70 | 5 | 10 | 15 | 43 | 10 | 0 | 0 | 0 | 6 |
| 2004–05 | Hamilton Bulldogs | AHL | 62 | 6 | 8 | 14 | 24 | 4 | 0 | 0 | 0 | 4 |
| 2005–06 | Hamilton Bulldogs | AHL | 39 | 7 | 8 | 15 | 65 | — | — | — | — | — |
| 2005–06 | Montreal Canadiens | NHL | 7 | 1 | 0 | 1 | 2 | — | — | — | — | — |
| 2006–07 | Hamilton Bulldogs | AHL | 78 | 23 | 14 | 37 | 87 | 22 | 3 | 6 | 9 | 19 |
| 2007–08 | Hamilton Bulldogs | AHL | 80 | 16 | 24 | 40 | 97 | — | — | — | — | — |
| 2008–09 | EC VSV | AUT | 53 | 20 | 28 | 48 | 110 | 6 | 2 | 2 | 4 | 18 |
| 2009–10 | EC VSV | AUT | 40 | 15 | 26 | 41 | 172 | 5 | 3 | 3 | 6 | 8 |
| 2010–11 | EC VSV | AUT | 51 | 18 | 22 | 40 | 113 | 10 | 3 | 4 | 7 | 24 |
| 2011–12 | Vienna Capitals | AUT | 40 | 24 | 24 | 48 | 99 | 7 | 6 | 3 | 9 | 12 |
| 2012–13 | Vienna Capitals | AUT | 21 | 7 | 7 | 14 | 26 | 15 | 6 | 5 | 11 | 26 |
| 2013–14 | Vienna Capitals | AUT | 53 | 23 | 22 | 45 | 44 | 5 | 1 | 2 | 3 | 8 |
| 2014–15 | Vienna Capitals | AUT | 52 | 15 | 21 | 36 | 53 | 15 | 4 | 8 | 12 | 10 |
| 2015–16 | Vienna Capitals | AUT | 38 | 8 | 15 | 23 | 64 | 3 | 0 | 1 | 1 | 0 |
| 2016–17 | Vienna Capitals | AUT | 53 | 17 | 23 | 40 | 43 | 12 | 3 | 1 | 4 | 13 |
| 2017–18 | Belfast Giants | EIHL | 47 | 14 | 21 | 35 | 86 | 2 | 2 | 0 | 2 | 2 |
| 2018–19 | Belfast Giants | EIHL | 50 | 8 | 11 | 19 | 48 | 4 | 3 | 0 | 3 | 2 |
| 2019–20 | Saint–Georges Cool FM 103.5 | LNAH | 26 | 5 | 9 | 14 | 30 | — | — | — | — | — |
| 2021–22 | Saint–Georges Cool FM 103.5 | LNAH | 3 | 0 | 0 | 0 | 2 | 5 | 0 | 0 | 0 | 6 |
| AHL totals | | | 329 | 57 | 64 | 121 | 316 | 36 | 3 | 6 | 9 | 69 |
| NHL totals | | | 7 | 1 | 0 | 1 | 2 | — | — | — | — | — |
| AUT totals | | | 401 | 147 | 188 | 355 | 724 | 78 | 28 | 29 | 57 | 119 |
