= Chris Stewart (ice hockey, born 1987) =

Canadian ice hockey player

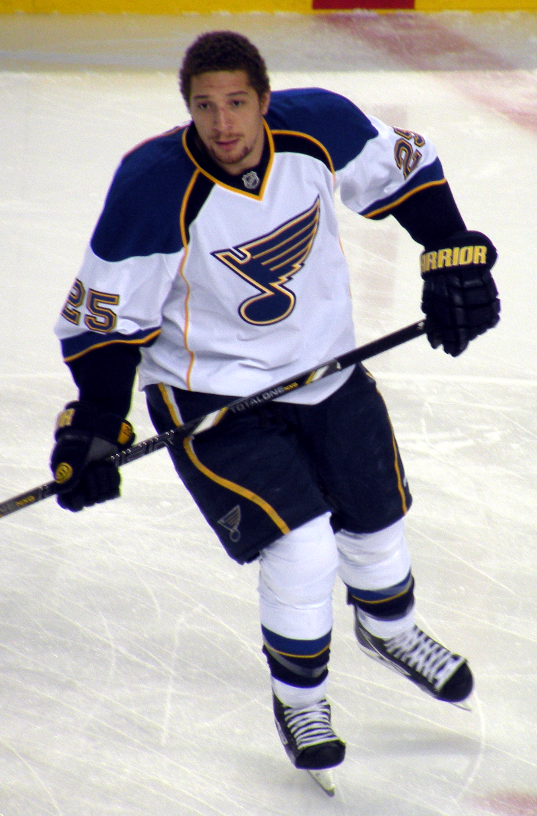
- Stewart with the St. Louis Blues in 2013
- Born: October 30, 1987 (age 38) Toronto, Ontario, Canada
- Height: 6 ft 2 in (188 cm)
- Weight: 239 lb (108 kg; 17 st 1 lb)
- Position: Right wing
- Shot: Right
- Played for: Colorado Avalanche; St. Louis Blues; HC Bílí Tygři Liberec; Buffalo Sabres; Minnesota Wild; Anaheim Ducks; Calgary Flames; Nottingham Panthers; Philadelphia Flyers
- National team: Canada
- NHL draft: 18th overall, 2006; Colorado Avalanche
- Playing career: 2007–2020

Chris Stewart (born October 30, 1987) is a Canadian former professional ice hockey forward. He played in the National Hockey League (NHL) for the Colorado Avalanche, St. Louis Blues, Buffalo Sabres, Minnesota Wild, Anaheim Ducks, Calgary Flames, and Philadelphia Flyers. He played junior hockey with the Kingston Frontenacs of the Ontario Hockey League (OHL). Stewart is the younger brother of Anthony Stewart, who also played in the NHL.

== Early years ==
Stewart was the second of seven children—he has five younger sisters—born to his mother, Sue, and his father, Norman, who came from a combined Jamaican and Irish background. Stewart grew up quite poor but he still loved to play hockey and was noted for his tenacity even before reaching his full size. He and Anthony played with the North York Jr. Canadiens, and thanks to a representative of the team, his hockey was paid for entirely. He also liked football and seriously considered playing it throughout his high school years at West Hill Collegiate Institute. Growing up, Stewart became friends with fellow Toronto native hockey player Wayne Simmonds.

== Playing career ==
=== Junior ===
Prior to the 2004–05, Stewart's older brother Anthony, who was the captain of the Kingston Frontenacs, put his reputation on the line when he asked Frontenacs General Manager Larry Mavety to give Chris the chance to try out with the Frontenacs as an undrafted free agent. Mavety complied, and Stewart made the team in training camp, allowing the brothers to play together on the same team. Initially given the position with the Frontenacs as an energetic fighting role player, Stewart took advantage of his increased playing time and had a solid rookie season, scoring 18 goals and 30 points in 64 games. Stewart played in his first OHL game on September 26, 2004, getting no points in a 4–3 loss to the Brampton Battalion. Stewart scored his first goal in the League on October 3, 2004, beating Sudbury Wolves goaltender Patrick Ehelechner in a 6–4 loss. The Frontenacs failed to qualify for the playoffs, finishing in ninth place in the Eastern Conference.

In 2005–06, Stewart had a breakout season, as he was named as an assistant captain, while scoring 37 goals and 87 points in 62 games to finish second in team scoring, helping Kingston to a playoff berth. In six playoff games, Stewart had two goals, as the Frontenacs lost to the Sudbury Wolves in the first round of the playoffs.

That summer, Stewart was drafted 18th overall in the first round of the 2006 NHL entry draft by the Colorado Avalanche.

On October 13, 2006, the Frontenacs revealed Stewart as the new captain of the team for the 2006–07 season at the Kingston Memorial Centre before a game against the Guelph Storm. Stewart had another solid season with Kingston, as he had 36 goals and 82 points in 61 games, finishing second in team scoring once again. In the post-season, Stewart had four goals and six points in five games, as the Frontenacs lost to the Oshawa Generals in the opening round of the playoffs.

=== Professional ===
==== Colorado Avalanche ====
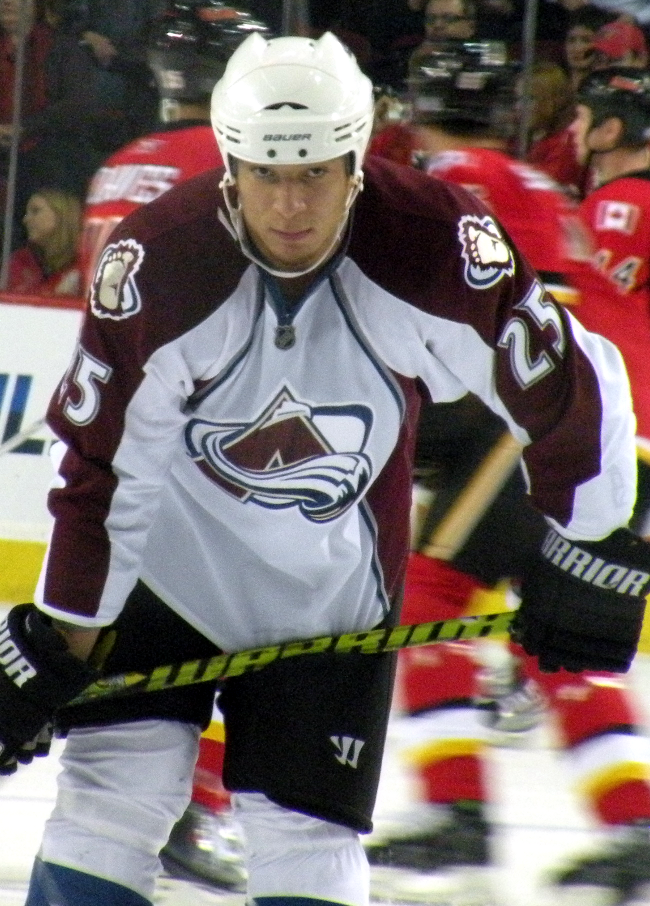
Stewart as a member of the Avalanche

Stewart made his professional debut with the Albany River Rats of the American Hockey League (AHL) at the end of the 2006–07 season. He played his first game with the team on April 4, 2007, getting no points in a 3-2 loss to the Springfield Falcons. Stewart recorded his first point, an assist, on April 6, 2007, as Albany defeated the Binghamton Senators 7-3. He then scored his first professional goal on April 14, 2007, as Stewart scored on Corey Crawford of the Norfolk Admirals in a 6-5 loss. In the playoffs, Stewart appeared in one game, getting no points, as the River Rats lost to the Hershey Bears in the first round.

In 2007–08, the Avalanche moved their AHL affiliate to Cleveland, Ohio, and renamed the team to the Lake Erie Monsters. Stewart spent the entire season with Lake Erie, scoring a team-high 25 goals, while finishing third in points with 44. Lake Erie, however, missed the playoffs. Stewart recorded a hat-trick on November 17, 2007, scoring three times on Toronto Marlies goaltender Justin Pogge in a 5–3 Monsters victory.

Stewart began the 2008–09 season with the Monsters, appearing in 19 games, scoring five goals and 11 points. He was then called up to the Colorado Avalanche on December 5, 2008.

Stewart played in his first NHL game that same night, getting no points and a –1 plus-minus rating in 7:29 ice time in the Avalanche's 2–1 shootout loss to the Dallas Stars. On December 9, 2008, Stewart scored his first career NHL goal, a shorthanded goal against Jason LaBarbera of the Los Angeles Kings, and added an assist in a 6–1 victory. On January 21, 2009, he earned his first ever Gordie Howe hat trick, which is a goal, an assist and a fight in the same game, in a 6–5 loss to Los Angeles. Stewart finished the 2008–09 season with 11 goals and 19 points in 53 games with Colorado, though the team failed to qualify for the 2009 Stanley Cup playoffs.

Stewart saw very little time with Lake Erie in 2009–10, appearing in just two games with the Monsters, earning no points. He spent the majority of the season with the Avalanche, and on December 2, 2009, Stewart had another Gordie Howe hat trick while recording his first three-point game in a 6–5 shootout loss to the Florida Panthers. On March 6, 2010, Stewart recorded his first career hat trick against the St. Louis Blues in a 7–3 win, scoring two goals against Chris Mason, followed by a penalty shot goal against Ty Conklin, while adding an assist to finish with a career-high four points in a game. He finished the season leading the Avalanche with 28 goals, while finishing second in team scoring with 64 points, helping the club into the 2010 playoffs. Stewart played in his first Stanley Cup playoff game on April 14, 2010, scoring a goal with 50 seconds left in the game against Evgeni Nabokov of the San Jose Sharks in a 2–1 Colorado win. Stewart finished the playoffs with three goals in six games as the Avalanche eventually lost to the Sharks in the first round of post-season.

In the off-season, Stewart signed a two-year contract with the Avalanche, and began the 2010–11 season with Colorado. On October 28, 2010, he earned his second career hat trick in a 6–5 Avalanche win over the Calgary Flames, scoring all three goals against Henrik Karlsson. On February 16, 2011, in his final game with the Avalanche, Stewart scored a goal in a 2-3 overtime loss to the Pittsburgh Penguins. He finished with 13 goals and 30 points in 36 games with Colorado.

==== St. Louis Blues ====
On February 19, 2011, the Avalanche traded Stewart, Kevin Shattenkirk and the Avalanche's second-round draft pick in 2011 to the St. Louis Blues for Erik Johnson, Jay McClement and the Blues' first-round pick in 2011. Stewart finished the 2010–11 season with the St. Louis Blues, making an immediate impact in his debut with the team. On February 19, 2011, Stewart scored two goals against Timo Pielmeier in a 9–3 rout over the Anaheim Ducks. He finished with 15 goals and 23 points in 26 games with the Blues, though St. Louis failed to qualify for the 2011 playoffs.

During the following 2011–12 season, Stewart struggled to reproduce his scoring prowess for the Blues. Unable to adjust to the defensive tactics of renowned Head Coach Ken Hitchcock, he was increasingly subject to trade rumours whilst used in a diminished checking role and relegated as a healthy scratch during parts of the 2012 playoffs. Stewart finished with 15 goals and 30 points in 79 games before he opted to re-sign to a one-year deal in hopes to rebound with the Blues.

With the commencement of the 2012–13 NHL lockout, Stewart signed a one-month contract, alongside childhood friend Wayne Simmonds, to play with the Eispiraten Crimmitschau of the 2nd Bundesliga in Germany on September 24, 2012. Becoming the most established NHL players in ETC Crimmitschau history, Stewart scored five goals and 11 points in nine games before he and Simmonds declined to extend their optional stint. Whilst opting to remain in Europe alongside Simmonds, Stewart signed to another lockout contract in the more competitive Czech Extraliga with HC Bílí Tygři Liberec on October 23, 2012. With the intention of playing alongside Simmonds and former NHLer Petr Nedvěd failing to materialize, and after five unfruitful games with Liberec, Stewart decided to return to Crimmitschau for the remainder of the lockout on November 13, 2012. Just under a month later, with new-found optimism of the lockout's end in sight and on advice to prevent injury, Stewart was released on his request from the remainder of his contract on December 7, 2012. He returned to North America having scored 20 points in just 15 games for the German club.

In the 2013–14, Stewart was named First Star of the Week on December 23, 2013, for his performance in the week ending December 22, after earning six goals and one assist.

==== Buffalo Sabres, Minnesota Wild and Anaheim Ducks ====
The Blues traded Stewart on February 28, 2014, along with Jaroslav Halák, William Carrier, a first-round draft pick in 2015, and a conditional draft pick in 2016, to the Buffalo Sabres in exchange for Ryan Miller and Steve Ott.

On March 2, 2015, minutes before the 2015 NHL trade deadline, Stewart was traded to the Minnesota Wild in exchange for a second-round pick in 2017 NHL Draft.

A deadline rental for the Wild, Stewart was released to free agency and on July 12, 2015, signed a one-year, $1.7 million deal with the Anaheim Ducks.

==== Return to Minnesota and Calgary Flames ====
On July 1, 2016, Stewart signed a two-year, $2.3 million deal with the Minnesota Wild.

During the 2017–18 season, having been placed on waivers by the Wild approaching the trade deadline, Stewart was claimed by the Calgary Flames on February 26, 2018. He appeared in 7 regular season games scoring 3 points as the Flames missed out on the post-season.

==== Later career ====
As a free agent from the Flames, Stewart was un-signed over the summer, before opting to continue his professional career in Europe agreeing to a one-year deal with Slovak club, HC Slovan Bratislava of the Kontinental Hockey League (KHL) on September 26, 2018. Stewart however never featured with Slovan, after he was initially reported missing by the club as a consequence of failing to attend the introductory press conference on October 3, 2018. He was later found and immediately announced his retirement from professional hockey citing family concerns.

After returning to Canada, Stewart was later announced to have signed for the 2018–19 season with semi-professional outfit the Hamilton Steelhawks, to compete for the Allan Cup on October 18, 2018.

On January 3, 2019, Stewart ended his brief retirement and signed for the Nottingham Panthers of the EIHL following in the footsteps of his elder brother who played there during the NHL lock-out in 2012. In the 2018–19 season, Stewart added a physical presence up front to the Panthers, notching 13 points in 23 games.

Returning to North America in the off-season as a free agent, on July 17, 2019, Stewart was signed by former Wild and current Philadelphia Flyers general manager Chuck Fletcher to a professional try-out contract to attend the Flyers 2019 training camp. He signed a one-year contract with the Flyers on October 15, 2019.

On June 8, 2020, Stewart became an inaugural executive board member the Hockey Diversity Alliance, whose goal is to address intolerance and racism in hockey. On September 27, 2020, Stewart announced his retirement after 13 professional seasons on Twitter. Remaining in hockey, Stewart continued within the Flyers organization remaining with the club as a player development coach.

== International play ==
Stewart played with Canada at the 2011 IIHF World Championship held in Slovakia, where in seven games, he recorded two goals and four points. Canada struggled in the tournament, and finished in fifth place.

== Career statistics ==
=== Regular season and playoffs ===
			Regular season					Playoffs
Season	Team	League	GP	G	A	Pts	PIM	GP	G	A	Pts	PIM
2004–05	Kingston Frontenacs	OHL	64	18	12	30	45	—	—	—	—	—
2005–06	Kingston Frontenacs	OHL	62	37	50	87	118	6	2	0	2	13
2006–07	Kingston Frontenacs	OHL	61	36	46	82	108	5	4	2	6	6
2006–07	Albany River Rats	AHL	5	1	2	3	2	1	0	0	0	0
2007–08	Lake Erie Monsters	AHL	77	25	19	44	93	—	—	—	—	—
2008–09	Lake Erie Monsters	AHL	19	5	6	11	23	—	—	—	—	—
2008–09	Colorado Avalanche	NHL	53	11	8	19	54	—	—	—	—	—
2009–10	Colorado Avalanche	NHL	77	28	36	64	73	6	3	0	3	4
2009–10	Lake Erie Monsters	AHL	2	0	0	0	2	—	—	—	—	—
2010–11	Colorado Avalanche	NHL	36	13	17	30	38	—	—	—	—	—
2010–11	St. Louis Blues	NHL	26	15	8	23	15	—	—	—	—	—
2011–12	St. Louis Blues	NHL	79	15	15	30	109	7	2	0	2	12
2012–13	ETC Crimmitschau	2.GBun	15	6	14	20	24	—	—	—	—	—
2012–13	HC Bílí Tygři Liberec	ELH	5	0	1	1	2	—	—	—	—	—
2012–13	St. Louis Blues	NHL	48	18	18	36	40	6	0	1	1	0
2013–14	St. Louis Blues	NHL	58	15	11	26	112	—	—	—	—	—
2013–14	Buffalo Sabres	NHL	5	0	0	0	6	—	—	—	—	—
2014–15	Buffalo Sabres	NHL	61	11	14	25	63	—	—	—	—	—
2014–15	Minnesota Wild	NHL	20	3	8	11	25	8	0	2	2	2
2015–16	Anaheim Ducks	NHL	56	8	12	20	73	7	1	2	3	0
2016–17	Minnesota Wild	NHL	79	13	8	21	94	5	0	0	0	0
2017–18	Minnesota Wild	NHL	47	9	4	13	29	—	—	—	—	—
2017–18	Calgary Flames	NHL	7	1	2	3	0	—	—	—	—	—
2018–19	Hamilton Steelhawks	ACH	1	0	2	2	14	—	—	—	—	—
2018–19	Nottingham Panthers	EIHL	23	6	7	13	27	3	1	3	4	0
2019–20	Philadelphia Flyers	NHL	16	0	1	1	21	—	—	—	—	—
2019–20	Lehigh Valley Phantoms	AHL	6	1	2	3	0	—	—	—	—	—
NHL totals			668	160	162	322	750	39	6	5	11	18

=== International ===
Year	Team	Event	Result	GP	G	A	Pts	PIM
2011	Canada	WC	5th	7	2	2	4	0
Senior totals				7	2	2	4	0

Awards and achievements
Preceded by Wojtek Wolski	Colorado Avalanche first-round draft pick 2006	Succeeded by Kevin Shattenkirk
