= Kris Newbury =

Canadian ice hockey player

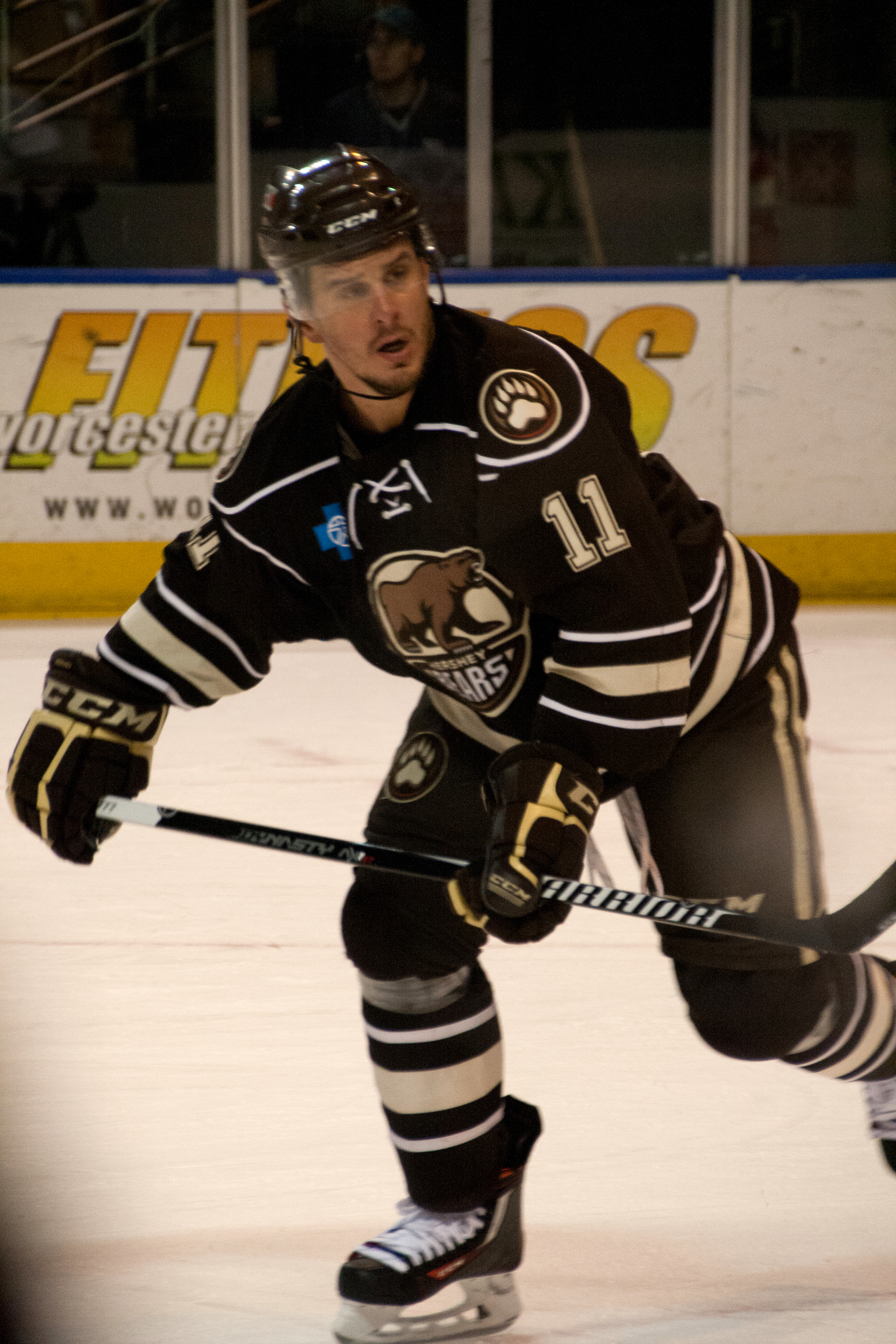
- Newbury with the Hershey Bears in 2015
- Born: February 19, 1982 (age 44) Brampton, Ontario, Canada
- Height: 5 ft 11 in (180 cm)
- Weight: 205 lb (93 kg; 14 st 9 lb)
- Position: Centre
- Shot: Left
- ACH team Former teams: Hamilton Steelhawks; Toronto Maple Leafs; Detroit Red Wings; New York Rangers; Philadelphia Flyers; Fischtown Pinguins
- NHL draft: 139th overall, 2002; San Jose Sharks
- Playing career: 2003–2019

Kris Newbury (born February 19, 1982) is a Canadian former professional ice hockey forward who is currently playing with the Deseronto Bulldogs in the Eastern Ontario Super Hockey League.

== Playing career ==
Newbury played in the Ontario Hockey League for the Belleville Bulls, and later the Sarnia Sting with whom he achieved two seasons of 104 and 92 points, in 2001–02 and 2002–03, respectively.

Newbury scored his first goal while a member of the Toronto Maple Leafs on January 1, 2007, against Boston Bruins goalie Tim Thomas.

On February 10, 2007, Newbury ended up in a fight with Ronald Petrovicky, of the Pittsburgh Penguins. He took several punches to the head and was knocked to the ice, giving him a concussion, which caused him to miss the remainder of the season.

On July 7, 2009, Newbury was signed by the Detroit Red Wings organization for the 2009–10 season. After initially starting the year with AHL affiliate, the Grand Rapids Griffins, on December 14, 2009, Newbury scored his first goal as a member of the Detroit Red Wings against the Phoenix Coyotes. On March 3, 2010, Newbury was traded by the Wings to the New York Rangers for forward Jordan Owens he was then assigned to affiliate the Hartford Wolfpack.

On June 16, 2010, he re-signed with the Rangers on a two-year contract.

On January 31, 2011, the New York Rangers recalled Newbury from the Connecticut Whale to the NHL. He was returned to the Whale on February 3, having scored one assist in eight games with the Rangers.

On March 23, 2013, the Rangers once again recalled Newbury from Connecticut. After being returned to Connecticut he was recalled again on April 26, 2013.

On July 1, 2013, the Rangers traded Newbury to the Philadelphia Flyers in exchange for defenseman Danny Syvret. In the 2013–14 season, Newbury was reassigned on loan from AHL affiliate, the Adirondack Phantoms, to the Hershey Bears on March 12, 2014.

On July 4, 2014, Newbury was signed as a free agent to a one-year, two-way contract with the Bears NHL affiliate, the Washington Capitals. Following his second season with the Bears Newbury had off-season back surgery. Despite this he quickly signed a new contract to play for the Los Angeles Kings AHL affiliate, the Ontario Reign. In the 2015–16 season, Newbury contributed with 10 goals and 26 points in 44 games.

As an unsigned free agent over the following summer, Newbury initially signed a contract to play in the ECHL with the Reading Royals. After making his Royals debut to begin the 2016–17 season, Newbury agreed to a professional try-out contract to return to the AHL with the Bakersfield Condors on October 18, 2016. Despite registering 3 goals in 14 games with the Condors, Newbury was released at the conclusion of his try-out tenure. The following day he continued in the AHL by signing a PTO with the Charlotte Checkers on November 29, 2016. He played out the season with the Checkers, posting 8 goals and 15 points in 38 games.

After 14 professional seasons in North America, Newbury signed his first contract abroad in agreeing to a one-year deal with German outfit, the Fischtown Pinguins of the Deutsche Eishockey Liga (DEL), on June 29, 2017.

On August 16, 2018, it was announced that Newbury would be returning to North America after signing a standard player contract with the Brampton Beast of the ECHL for the 2018–19 season. After reporting for training camp with the Beast, Newbury was placed on waivers and subsequently claimed to add experience to the Jacksonville Icemen on October 14, 2018.

== Career statistics ==
=== Regular season and playoffs ===
			Regular season					Playoffs
Season	Team	League	GP	G	A	Pts	PIM	GP	G	A	Pts	PIM
1996–97	Brampton Capitals	OPJHL	28	9	4	13	26	—	—	—	—	—
1997–98	Brampton Capitals	OPJHL	46	11	21	32	161	—	—	—	—	—
1998–99	Belleville Bulls	OHL	51	6	8	14	89	21	4	6	10	23
1999–2000	Belleville Bulls	OHL	34	6	18	24	72	—	—	—	—	—
1999–2000	Sarnia Sting	OHL	27	6	8	14	44	7	0	3	3	16
2000–01	Sarnia Sting	OHL	64	28	30	58	126	4	1	3	4	20
2001–02	Sarnia Sting	OHL	66	42	62	104	141	5	1	3	4	15
2002–03	Sarnia Sting	OHL	64	34	58	92	149	6	4	4	8	16
2003–04	St. John's Maple Leafs	AHL	72	5	15	20	153	—	—	—	—	—
2004–05	Pensacola Ice Pilots	ECHL	6	2	4	6	20	—	—	—	—	—
2004–05	St. John's Maple Leafs	AHL	55	4	9	13	103	5	0	0	0	26
2005–06	Toronto Marlies	AHL	74	22	38	60	215	5	0	1	1	12
2006–07	Toronto Marlies	AHL	37	12	24	36	87	—	—	—	—	—
2006–07	Toronto Maple Leafs	NHL	15	2	2	4	26	—	—	—	—	—
2007–08	Toronto Maple Leafs	NHL	28	1	1	2	32	—	—	—	—	—
2007–08	Toronto Marlies	AHL	54	16	27	43	101	19	4	9	13	73
2008–09	Toronto Marlies	AHL	33	6	23	29	72	—	—	—	—	—
2008–09	Toronto Maple Leafs	NHL	1	0	0	0	2	—	—	—	—	—
2009–10	Grand Rapids Griffins	AHL	52	11	22	33	144	—	—	—	—	—
2009–10	Detroit Red Wings	NHL	4	1	0	1	4	—	—	—	—	—
2009–10	Hartford Wolf Pack	AHL	18	4	14	18	61	—	—	—	—	—
2010–11	Hartford Wolf Pack/CT Whale	AHL	69	17	44	61	139	6	2	2	4	2
2010–11	New York Rangers	NHL	11	0	1	1	35	—	—	—	—	—
2011–12	Connecticut Whale	AHL	65	25	39	64	130	9	1	3	4	20
2011–12	New York Rangers	NHL	7	0	0	0	24	—	—	—	—	—
2012–13	Connecticut Whale	AHL	70	20	42	62	127	—	—	—	—	—
2012–13	New York Rangers	NHL	6	0	1	1	9	3	0	0	0	2
2013–14	Adirondack Phantoms	AHL	46	14	22	36	182	—	—	—	—	—
2013–14	Philadelphia Flyers	NHL	4	0	1	1	7	—	—	—	—	—
2013–14	Hershey Bears	AHL	17	4	9	13	25	—	—	—	—	—
2014–15	Hershey Bears	AHL	68	18	30	48	171	10	0	4	4	16
2015–16	Ontario Reign	AHL	44	10	16	26	79	12	1	2	3	17
2016–17	Reading Royals	ECHL	1	1	2	3	2	—	—	—	—	—
2016–17	Bakersfield Condors	AHL	14	3	2	5	17	—	—	—	—	—
2016–17	Charlotte Checkers	AHL	38	8	7	15	33	—	—	—	—	—
2017–18	Fischtown Pinguins	DEL	45	11	25	36	124	7	3	7	10	6
2018–19	Jacksonville Icemen	ECHL	57	16	31	47	106	6	1	5	6	6
2019–20	Hamilton Steelhawks	ACH	4	3	1	4	2	5	1	7	8	0
2020–21	Gananoque Islanders	EOSHL	4	3	8	11	4	2	1	1	2	6
AHL totals			826	199	383	582	1839	66	8	21	29	166
NHL totals			76	4	6	10	139	3	0	0	0	2

=== International ===
Year	Team	Event	Result	GP	G	A	Pts	PIM
1999	Canada Ontario	U17	4th	3	1	1	2	4
1999	Canada	U18	1st place, gold medalist(s)	3	4	0	4	0
Junior totals				6	5	1	6	4
