= Mark Hurtubise =

Canadian ice hockey player

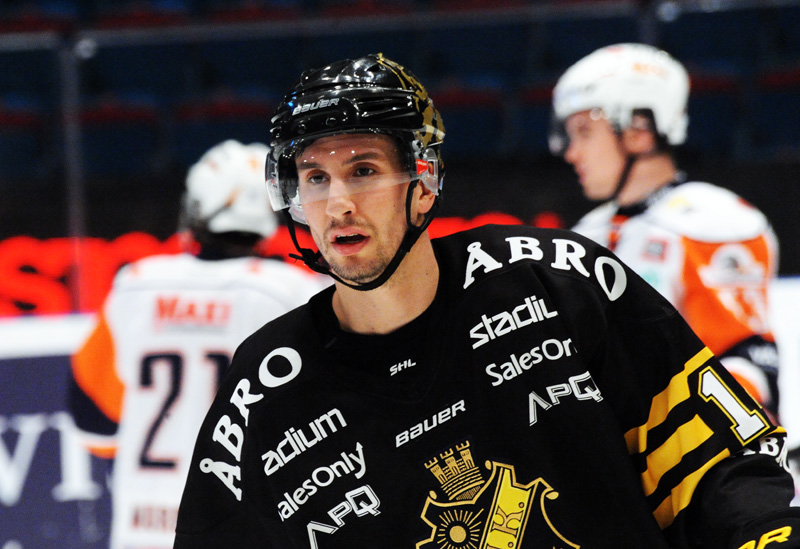
- Born: June 9, 1984 (age 40); Montreal, Quebec, Canada
- Height: 6 ft 2 in (188 cm)
- Weight: 185 lb (84 kg; 13 st 3 lb)
- Position: Forward
- Shoots: Right
- Ligue Magnus team Former teams: Boxers de Bordeaux; Long Beach Ice Dogs; Mississippi Sea Wolves; Edinburgh Capitals; Olofströms IK; Almtuna IS; Leksands IF; AIK; Ilves; IF Björklöven; HC Red Ice; Krefeld Pinguine; EC KAC; Nottingham Panthers; EHC Lustenau
- NHL draft: Undrafted
- Playing career: 2005–present

Mark Hurtubise (born June 9, 1984) is a Canadian professional ice hockey player. He is currently playing for Boxers de Bordeaux of the Ligue Magnus.

== Playing career ==
Hurtubise played major junior hockey in the Quebec Major Junior Hockey League from 2001 to 2005 where he scored 161 points in 247 games played. He made his professional debut in the United Hockey League playing with the Adirondack Frostbite for the 2005-06 season.

After two years in the ECHL with the Long Beach Ice Dogs and the Mississippi Sea Wolves, he continued his career overseas.

He joined the Edinburgh Capitals of UK’s Elite Ice Hockey League for the 2008-09 season where he led the league with points (30 goals, 59 assists from 54 games, adding a further 3 points from 2 Playoff games), followed by some years in Sweden. He spent the 2009-10 season with third-division side Olofströms IK, tallying 35 goals and 40 assists in 40 games and got picked up by Almtuna IS of the country’s second-tier Allsvenskan prior to the 2010-11 campaign. Hurtubise transferred to fellow-Allsvenskan team Leksands IF for the 2011-12 season. After two years with the club he received the chance to prove his skills in Sweden’s top flight SHL: On April 26, 2013, AIK IF announced to have signed Hurtubise for the upcoming 2013/2014 season.

He started the 2014-15 campaign with Ilves of the Finnish top flight Liiga. On October 17, 2014, IF Björklöven of the HockeyAllsvenskan, the second-highest league in Sweden, announced the signing of Hurtubise for the rest of the season 2014/2015.

At the beginning of the 2015–16 campaign, Hurtubise played 14 games for HC Red Ice of the Swiss second-division National League B. In December 2015, he moved to Krefeld Pinguine of the German top flight Deutsche Eishockey Liga (DEL) where he signed a deal for the remainder of the season.

In July 2016, he put pen to paper on a contract with EC KAC of the Austrian Hockey League, where he would go on to post 12 goals, 14 assists in 54 regular-season games. Season 17-18 saw Hurtubise head to Denmark to play for Frederikshavn White Hawks in the Metal Ligaen. He produced 53 points in 48 games and a further 3 points in 4 post-season playoff games.

In July 2018, he signed a contract to return to the UK’s Elite Ice Hockey League, this time to play for the Nottingham Panthers.

After a season with the Panthers, Hurtubise signed for EHC Lustenau before moving to Boxers de Bordeaux for the 2020-21 season.
