= Travis Fullerton (ice hockey) =

Canadian ice hockey player

- Born: November 3, 1987 (age 37); Riverview, New Brunswick, Canada
- Height: 6 ft 1 in (185 cm)
- Weight: 181 lb (82 kg; 12 st 13 lb)
- Position: Goaltender
- Caught: Left
- Played for: AHL; Rochester Americans; ECHL; San Francisco Bulls; Las Vegas Wranglers; Elmira Jackals; EIHL; Braehead Clan; Edinburgh Capitals; Dundee Stars; Guildford Flames
- NHL draft: Undrafted
- Playing career: 2013–2021

Travis Fullerton (born November 3, 1987) is a former Canadian professional ice hockey goaltender who last played for Guildford Flames in the Elite Ice Hockey League (EIHL).

== Early life and education ==
Fullerton was born in Riverview, New Brunswick. He graduated from the University of New Brunswick with degree in business.

== Career ==
Fullerton has played professionally in the American Hockey League (AHL) for the Rochester Americans, the East Coast Hockey League (ECHL) for the San Francisco Bulls, Las Vegas Wranglers, and Elmira Jackals, and in the Elite Ice Hockey League (EIHL) for the Braehead Clan, the Edinburgh Capitals, and the Dundee Stars.
