= 2018 Kelly Cup playoffs =

Event Colorado Eagles won before joining American Hockey League

Tournament details
- Dates: April 12–June 9, 2018
- Teams: 16

Final positions
- Champions: Colorado Eagles
- Runner-up: Florida Everblades

Tournament statistics
- Scoring leader(s): Michael Joly (Colorado) (29 points)

The 2018 Kelly Cup playoffs of the ECHL began in April 2018 following the conclusion of the 2017–18 ECHL regular season. The Kelly Cup was won by the Colorado Eagles, in their last season in the ECHL before joining the American Hockey League, in seven games over the regular season champions, the Florida Everblades.

== Playoff format ==
At the end of the regular season the top four teams in each division qualifies for the 2018 Kelly Cup playoffs and be seeded one through four based on highest point total earned in the season. Then the first two rounds of the playoffs are held within the division with the first seed facing the fourth seed and the second seed facing the third. The division champions then play each other in a conference championship. The Kelly Cup finals pits the Eastern Conference champion against the Western Conference champion. All four rounds are a best-of-seven format.

== Playoff seeds ==
After the regular season, 16 teams qualify for the playoffs. The Florida Everblades were the first team to qualify during the regular season on February 28. The Everblades were the Eastern Conference regular season champions and clinched the Brabham Cup with the best record in the ECHL on April 5. The Toledo Walleye earned the top seed in the Western Conference.

Final seeds

=== Eastern Conference ===
==== North Division ====
1. Adirondack Thunder – Division champions, 89 pts
2. Manchester Monarchs – 88 pts
3. Reading Royals – 87 pts
4. Worcester Railers – 82 pts

==== South Division ====
1. Florida Everblades – Brabham Cup winners, division champions, 112 pts
2. South Carolina Stingrays – 104 pts
3. Orlando Solar Bears – 75 pts
4. Atlanta Gladiators – 69 pts

=== Western Conference ===
==== Central Division ====
1. Toledo Walleye – Division champions, 105 pts
2. Fort Wayne Komets – 98 pts
3. Cincinnati Cyclones – 81 pts
4. Indy Fuel – 78 pts

==== Mountain Division ====
1. Colorado Eagles – Division champions, 102 pts
2. Idaho Steelheads – 96 pts
3. Allen Americans – 78 pts
4. Wichita Thunder – 76 pts

== Playoff bracket ==
Division Semifinals	Division Finals
N1	Adirondack Thunder	4
N4	Worcester Railers	2
N1	Adirondack	4
North Division
N2	Manchester	2
N2	Manchester Monarchs	4
N3	Reading Royals	0
Eastern Conference
S1	Florida Everblades	4
S4	Atlanta Gladiators	0
S1	Florida	4
South Division
S3	Orlando	1
S2	South Carolina Stingrays	0
S3	Orlando Solar Bears	4
C1	Toledo Walleye	4
C4	Indy Fuel	0
C1	Toledo	2
Central Division
C2	Fort Wayne	4
C2	Fort Wayne Komets	4
C3	Cincinnati Cyclones	1
Western Conference
M1	Colorado Eagles	4
M4	Wichita Thunder	2
M1	Colorado	4
Mountain Division
M2	Idaho	0
M2	Idaho Steelheads	4
M3	Allen Americans	3

Conference Finals
N1	Adirondack	1
S1	Florida	4
C2	Fort Wayne	3
M1	Colorado	4

Kelly Cup Finals
S1	Florida	3
M1	Colorado	4

== Division semifinals ==
=== North Division ===
==== (1) Adirondack Thunder vs. (4) Worcester Railers ====
April 13	Worcester Railers	0 – 3	Adirondack Thunder	Cool Insuring Arena	Recap
No scoring		First period	8:58 – Tim Harrison (1)
No scoring		Second period	7:54 – pp – Paul Rodrigues (1)
No scoring		Third period	5:50 – Brian Ward (1)
Mitch Gillam 18 saves / 21 shots		Goalie stats	Mackenzie Blackwood 27 saves / 27 shots

April 14	Adirondack Thunder	0 – 2	Worcester Railers	DCU Center	Recap
No scoring		First period	No scoring
No scoring		Second period	Woody Hudson (1) – 7:40
No scoring		Third period	Barry Almeida (1) – sh – en – 19:14
Mackenzie Blackwood 25 saves / 26 shots		Goalie stats	Mitch Gillam 14 saves / 14 shots

April 15	Adirondack Thunder	3 – 1	Worcester Railers	DCU Center	Recap
Brian Ward (2) – pp – 10:51		First period	No scoring
Mike Szmatula (1) – 2:48		Second period	6:23 – Jeff Kubiak (1)
Ryan Schmelzer (1) – en – 19:47		Third period	No scoring
Mackenzie Blackwood 28 saves / 29 shots		Goalie stats	Eamon McAdam 33 saves / 35 shots

April 18	Worcester Railers	1 – 2	Adirondack Thunder	Cool Insuring Arena	Recap
No scoring		First period	Ryan Schmelzer (2) – 8:07
11:12 – pp – Barry Almeida (2)		Second period	Brian Ward (3) – 12:44
No scoring		Third period	No scoring
Eamon McAdam 26 saves / 28 shots		Goalie stats	Mackenzie Blackwood 28 saves / 29 shots

April 21	Worcester Railers	6 – 5	Adirondack Thunder	Cool Insuring Arena	Recap
Josh Holmstrom (1) – 0:35		First period	6:52 – pp – Ryan Schmelzer (3); 7:55 – Mike Bergin (1); 12:14 – pp – Shane Conacher (1)
Nick Saracino (1) – 6:58; Matt Gaudreau (1) – pp – 11:55; Matt Lane (1) – 12:55		Second period	5:49 – Tim Harrison (2)
Nick Saracino (2) – 3:32; Nick Saracino (3) – pp – 14:02		Third period	0:19 – Brian Ward (4)
Mitch Gillam 10 saves / 14 shots Eamon McAdam 18 saves / 19 shots		Goalie stats	Mackenzie Blackwood 0 saves / 1 shot Olivier Mantha 20 saves / 25 shots

April 23	Adirondack Thunder	3 – 1	Worcester Railers	DCU Center	Recap
Paul Rodrigues (2) – sh – 8:27; Desmond Bergin (1) – 19:57		First period	9:09 – Barry Almeida (3)
No scoring		Second period	No scoring
Mike Szmatula (2) – en – 19:15		Third period	No scoring
Olivier Mantha 27 saves / 28 shots		Goalie stats	Eamon McAdam 22 saves / 24 shots

Adirondack won series 4–2

==== (2) Manchester Monarchs vs. (3) Reading Royals ====
April 13	Reading Royals	2 – 3	2OT	Manchester Monarchs	SNHU Arena	Recap

April 14	Reading Royals	2 – 3	2OT	Manchester Monarchs	SNHU Arena	Recap

April 16	Manchester Monarchs	4 – 3	OT	Reading Royals	Santander Arena	Recap

April 18	Manchester Monarchs	3 – 0	Reading Royals	Santander Arena	Recap

Manchester won series 4–0

=== South Division ===
==== (1) Florida Everblades vs. (4) Atlanta Gladiators ====
April 16	Atlanta Gladiators	1 – 4	Florida Everblades	Germain Arena	Recap
No scoring		First period	No scoring
Alex Rauter (1) – pp – 18:33		Second period	7:35 – Brett Bulmer (1)
No scoring		Third period	8:24 – Mitchell Heard (1); 14:39 – sh – John McCarron (1); 19:31 – en – Michael Kirkpatrick (1)
Daniel Vladař 45 saves / 48 shots		Goalie stats	Martin Ouellette 20 saves / 21 shots

April 17	Atlanta Gladiators	2 – 3	Florida Everblades	Germain Arena	Recap

April 19	Florida Everblades	4 – 2	Atlanta Gladiators	Infinite Energy Arena	Recap

April 20	Florida Everblades	3 – 2	OT	Atlanta Gladiators	Infinite Energy Arena	Recap

Florida won series 4–0

==== (2) South Carolina Stingrays vs. (3) Orlando Solar Bears ====
April 12	Orlando Solar Bears	2 – 0	South Carolina Stingrays	North Charleston Coliseum	Recap
No scoring		First period	No scoring
Hunter Fejes (1) – sh – 7:47		Second period	No scoring
J.J. Piccinich (1) – en – 19:07		Third period	No scoring
Cal Heeter 36 saves / 36 shots		Goalie stats	Parker Milner 18 saves / 19 shots

April 14	Orlando Solar Bears	2 – 1	South Carolina Stingrays	North Charleston Coliseum	Recap
No scoring		First period	No scoring
Max Novak (1) – pp – 0:38; J.J. Piccinich (2) – 18:37		Second period	No scoring
No scoring		Third period	9:21 – Mason Mitchell (1)
Cal Heeter 23 saves / 24 shots		Goalie stats	Parker Milner 21 saves / 23 shots

April 19	South Carolina Stingrays	1 – 2	OT	Orlando Solar Bears	Amway Center	Recap
No scoring		First period		No scoring
Mason Mitchell (2) – 7:47		Second period		16:46 – Joe Perry (1)
No scoring		Third period		No scoring
No scoring		First overtime period		17:29 – sh – Hunter Fejes (2)
Parker Milner 28 saves / 30 shots		Goalie stats		Cal Heeter 49 saves / 50 shots

April 21	South Carolina Stingrays	1 – 2	OT	Orlando Solar Bears	Amway Center	Recap
No scoring		First period		No scoring
No scoring		Second period		11:27 – pp – Sam Jardine (1)
Patrick Megannety (1) – sh – 4:35		Third period		No scoring
No scoring		First overtime period		Jean Dupy
Parker Milner 21 saves / 23 shots		Goalie stats		Cal Heeter 41 saves / 42 shots

Orlando won series 4–0

=== Central Division ===
==== (1) Toledo Walleye vs. (4) Indy Fuel ====
April 13	Indy Fuel	3 – 4	2OT	Toledo Walleye	Huntington Center	Recap

April 15	Indy Fuel	3 – 4	Toledo Walleye	Huntington Center	Recap

April 18	Toledo Walleye	3 – 1	Indy Fuel	Indiana Farmers Coliseum	Recap

April 19	Toledo Walleye	3 – 2	2OT	Indy Fuel	Indiana Farmers Coliseum	Recap

Toledo won series 4–0

==== (2) Fort Wayne Komets vs. (3) Cincinnati Cyclones ====
April 14	Cincinnati Cyclones	3 – 4	2OT	Fort Wayne Komets	Allen County War Memorial Coliseum	Recap
Daniel Muzito Bagenda (1) – pp – 5:26		First period		No scoring
Justin Vaive (1) – 1:00		Second period		9:30 – Daniel Maggio (1); 13:13 – pp – Garrett Thompson (1)
Jesse Schultz (1) – pp – 8:41		Third period		6:39 – Ryan Lowney (1)
No scoring		Second overtime period		6:29 – Jamie Schaafsma (1)
Jonas Johansson 68 saves / 72 shots		Goalie stats		Michael Houser 26 saves / 29 shots

April 15	Cincinnati Cyclones	1 – 3	Fort Wayne Komets	Allen County War Memorial Coliseum	Recap

April 19	Fort Wayne Komets	6 – 7	OT	Cincinnati Cyclones	U.S. Bank Arena	Recap

April 21	Fort Wayne Komets	2 – 1	Cincinnati Cyclones	U.S. Bank Arena	Recap

April 22	Fort Wayne Komets	4 – 2	Cincinnati Cyclones	U.S. Bank Arena	Recap

Fort Wayne won series 4–1

=== Mountain Division ===
==== (1) Colorado Eagles vs. (4) Wichita Thunder ====
April 15	Colorado Eagles	2 – 1	Wichita Thunder	Intrust Bank Arena	Recap
No scoring		First period	Lane Bauer (1) – 7:12
No scoring		Second period	No scoring
11:14 – pp – Drayson Bowman (1)		Third period	No scoring
5:23 – sh – J.C. Beaudin (1)		Overtime	No scoring
Joe Cannata 13 saves / 14 shots		Goalie stats	Shane Starrett 37 saves / 39 shots

April 16	Colorado Eagles	5 – 2	Wichita Thunder	Intrust Bank Arena	Recap

April 18	Wichita Thunder	2 – 4	Colorado Eagles	Budweiser Events Center	Recap

April 20	Wichita Thunder	6 – 0	Colorado Eagles	Budweiser Events Center	Recap

April 21	Wichita Thunder	5 – 4	OT	Colorado Eagles	Budweiser Events Center	Recap

April 23	Colorado Eagles	5 – 3	Wichita Thunder	Intrust Bank Arena	Recap

Colorado won series 4–2

==== (2) Idaho Steelheads vs. (3) Allen Americans ====
April 13	Allen Americans	3 – 2	Idaho Steelheads	CenturyLink Arena	Recap

April 14	Allen Americans	5 – 4	Idaho Steelheads	CenturyLink Arena	Recap

April 18	Idaho Steelheads	3 – 5	Allen Americans	Allen Event Center	Recap

April 20	Idaho Steelheads	2 – 1	Allen Americans	Allen Event Center	Recap

April 22	Idaho Steelheads	2 – 1	Allen Americans	Allen Event Center	Recap

April 24	Allen Americans	3 – 6	Idaho Steelheads	CenturyLink Arena	Recap

April 25	Allen Americans	1 – 3	Idaho Steelheads	CenturyLink Arena	Recap

Idaho won series 4–3

== Division finals ==
=== North Division ===
==== (N1) Adirondack Thunder vs. (N2) Manchester Monarchs ====
April 27	Manchester Monarchs	5 – 3	Adirondack Thunder	Cool Insuring Arena	Recap

April 28	Manchester Monarchs	1 – 5	Adirondack Thunder	Cool Insuring Arena	Recap

May 1	Manchester Monarchs	3 – 5	Adirondack Thunder	Cool Insuring Arena	Recap

May 3	Manchester Monarchs	3 – 0	Adirondack Thunder	Cool Insuring Arena	Recap

May 6	Adirondack Thunder	6 – 0	Manchester Monarchs	SNHU Arena	Recap

May 7	Adirondack Thunder	3 – 2	3OT	Manchester Monarchs	SNHU Arena	Recap

Adirondack won series 4–2

=== South Division ===
==== (S1) Florida Everblades vs. (S3) Orlando Solar Bears ====
April 27	Orlando Solar Bears	1 – 4	Florida Everblades	Germain Arena	Recap

April 28	Orlando Solar Bears	1 – 5	Florida Everblades	Germain Arena	Recap

May 3	Florida Everblades	5 – 1	Orlando Solar Bears	Amway Center	Recap

May 4	Florida Everblades	3 – 5	Orlando Solar Bears	Amway Center	Recap

May 6	Florida Everblades	5 – 2	Orlando Solar Bears	Amway Center	Recap

Florida won series 4–1

=== Central Division ===
==== (C1) Toledo Walleye vs. (C2) Fort Wayne Komets ====
April 28	Fort Wayne Komets	5 – 3	Toledo Walleye	Huntington Center	Recap

April 29	Fort Wayne Komets	1 – 2	Toledo Walleye	Huntington Center	Recap

May 2	Toledo Walleye	4 – 3	Fort Wayne Komets	Allen County War Memorial Coliseum	Recap

May 4	Toledo Walleye	1 – 3	Fort Wayne Komets	Allen County War Memorial Coliseum	Recap

May 5	Fort Wayne Komets	4 – 1	Toledo Walleye	Huntington Center	Recap

May 8	Toledo Walleye	2 – 4	Fort Wayne Komets	Allen County War Memorial Coliseum	Recap

Fort Wayne won series 4–2

=== Mountain Division ===
==== (M1) Colorado Eagles vs. (M2) Idaho Steelheads ====
April 28	Idaho Steelheads	0 – 1	OT	Colorado Eagles	Budweiser Events Center	Recap

April 29	Idaho Steelheads	2 – 6	Colorado Eagles	Budweiser Events Center	Recap

May 2	Colorado Eagles	3 – 2	Idaho Steelheads	CenturyLink Arena	Recap

May 3	Colorado Eagles	1 – 0	OT	Idaho Steelheads	CenturyLink Arena	Recap

Colorado won series 4–0

== Conference finals ==
=== Eastern Conference ===
==== (S1) Florida Everblades vs. (N1) Adirondack Thunder ====
May 11	Adirondack Thunder	3 – 4	Florida Everblades	Germain Arena	Recap

May 12	Adirondack Thunder	3 – 2	OT	Florida Everblades	Germain Arena	Recap

May 16	Florida Everblades	3 – 2	Adirondack Thunder	Cool Insuring Arena	Recap

May 18	Florida Everblades	7 – 3	Adirondack Thunder	Cool Insuring Arena	Recap

May 19	Florida Everblades	3 – 2	Adirondack Thunder	Cool Insuring Arena	Recap

Florida won series 4–1

=== Western Conference ===
==== (M1) Colorado Eagles vs. (C2) Fort Wayne Komets ====
May 12	Fort Wayne Komets	2 – 3	OT	Colorado Eagles	Budweiser Events Center	Recap

May 13	Fort Wayne Komets	3 – 2	Colorado Eagles	Budweiser Events Center	Recap

May 16	Colorado Eagles	2 – 4	Fort Wayne Komets	Allen County War Memorial Coliseum	Recap

May 18	Colorado Eagles	2 – 1	Fort Wayne Komets	Allen County War Memorial Coliseum	Recap

May 19	Colorado Eagles	4 – 3	2OT	Fort Wayne Komets	Allen County War Memorial Coliseum	Recap

May 22	Fort Wayne Komets	3 – 2	Colorado Eagles	Budweiser Events Center	Recap

May 23	Fort Wayne Komets	3 – 4	OT	Colorado Eagles	Budweiser Events Center	Recap

Colorado won series 4–3

== Kelly Cup finals ==
=== (S1) Florida Everblades vs. (M1) Colorado Eagles ===
May 25	Florida Everblades	1 – 3	Colorado Eagles	Budweiser Events Center	Recap

May 27	Florida Everblades	4 – 3	Colorado Eagles	Budweiser Events Center	Recap

May 30	Colorado Eagles	5 – 4	OT	Florida Everblades	Germain Arena	Recap

June 1	Colorado Eagles	6 – 7	OT	Florida Everblades	Germain Arena	Recap

June 2	Colorado Eagles	0 – 5	Florida Everblades	Germain Arena	Recap

June 6	Florida Everblades	2 – 4	Colorado Eagles	Budweiser Events Center	Recap

June 9	Colorado Eagles	3 – 2	Florida Everblades	Germain Arena	Recap

Colorado won series 4–3

== Statistical leaders ==
=== Skaters ===
These are the top ten skaters based on points.

Player	Team	GP	G	A	Pts	+/–	PIM
Michael Joly	Colorado Eagles	24	13	16	29	+11	16
Michael Kirkpatrick	Florida Everblades	18	11	11	22	+5	12
Mitchell Heard	Florida Everblades	20	9	13	22	+4	39
John McCarron	Florida Everblades	21	10	10	20	+3	62
Gabriel Desjardins	Fort Wayne Komets	18	9	11	20	+13	12
Matt Register	Colorado Eagles	24	3	17	20	+4	16
J.C. Beaudin	Colorado Eagles	22	10	8	18	+0	6
Ryan Schmelzer	Adirondack Thunder	17	9	8	17	+9	24
Shawn Szydlowski	Fort Wayne Komets	17	4	13	17	+0	16
Garrett Thompson	Fort Wayne Komets	18	7	9	16	+5	16

GP = Games played; G = Goals; A = Assists; Pts = Points; +/– = Plus/minus; PIM = Penalty minutes

=== Goaltending ===
This is a combined table of the top five goaltenders based on goals against average and the top five goaltenders based on save percentage, with at least 240 minutes played. The table is sorted by GAA, and the criteria for inclusion are bolded.

Player	Team	GP	W	L	OTL	SA	GA	GAA	SV%	SO	TOI
Mackenzie Blackwood	Adirondack Thunder	5	3	1	0	112	4	**1.00**	**0.964**	1	240
Parker Milner	South Carolina Stingrays	4	0	2	2	95	7	**1.54**	0.926	0	273
Cal Heeter	Orlando Solar Bears	8	4	3	0	255	14	**1.90**	**0.945**	1	443
Philippe Desrosiers	Idaho Steelheads	10	4	3	2	290	19	**2.00**	**0.934**	0	571
John Muse	Reading Royals	4	0	1	3	200	11	**2.02**	**0.945**	0	328
Drew Fielding	Adirondack Thunder	10	5	5	0	360	25	2.35	**0.931**	1	639

GP = Games played; W = Wins; L = Losses; OTL = Overtime Losses; SA = Shots against; GA = Goals against; GAA = Goals against average; SV% = Save percentage; SO = Shutouts; TOI = Time on ice (in minutes)

== See also ==
- 2017–18 ECHL season
- List of ECHL seasons

Preceded by 2017 Kelly Cup playoffs	Kelly Cup Playoffs; 2018	Succeeded by 2019 Kelly Cup playoffs
