= David Clements (ice hockey) =

British ice hockey player (born 1994)

- Born: 20 September 1994 (age 31) Coventry, West Midlands, England
- Height: 1.85 m (6 ft 1 in)
- Weight: 84 kg (185 lb; 13 st 3 lb)
- Position: Defence
- Shoots: Right
- EIHL team Former teams: Coventry Blaze; Milton Keynes Lightning; Telford Tigers; Ogden Mustangs
- National team: Great Britain
- Playing career: 2009–present

David Clements (born 20 September 1994) is an English professional ice hockey player who is a defenceman for the Coventry Blaze of the Elite Ice Hockey League (EIHL).

== Biography ==
Clements was born on 20 September 1994 in Coventry, West Midlands. He played for the Coventry Blaze junior teams until 2009, when he studied at the Athol Murray College of Notre Dame in Canada. In 2012, he was captain of the Great Britain under 18s team for the World Championships in Holland.

Clements plays as a right-shot defenceman for Coventry Blaze. In his early professional career he played for the Ogden Mustangs, Milton Keynes Lightning and the Telford Tigers. Clements began playing for Coventry Blaze in 2015.

Clements became an associate captain of Coventry Blaze in 2022/23. He played his 500th game in the Elite Ice Hockey League on 18 December 2024. After ten years playing with Coventry Blaze, Clements was honoured with a testimonial game on 17 May 2025.

Clements has represented Great Britain at the 2021 IIHF World Championship, the 2022 IIHF World Championship and the 2023 IIHF World Championship. He also played in the 2026 Winter Olympics qualification match against Romania, with a 7-4 win. He was called up for Great Britain men's national ice hockey team at the 2026 Men's Ice Hockey World Championships in Switzerland along with Coventry Blaze goaltender Mat Robson and forward Jack Hopkins.

== Career statistics ==
=== Regular season and playoffs ===
			Regular season					Playoffs
Season	Team	League	GP	G	A	Pts	PIM	GP	G	A	Pts	PIM
2010–11	Notre Dame Argos U18 AA SS	SSMHL U18	38	11	20	31	68	11	9	8	17	28
2010–11	Notre Dame Hounds U18 AAA	SMAAAHL	10	1	0	1	8	—	—	—	—	—
2011–12	Notre Dame Hounds U18 AAA	SMAAAHL	43	6	15	21	108	—	—	—	—	—
2012–13	Ogden Mustangs	WSHL	43	7	14	21	151	3	0	1	1	2
2013–14	Ogden Mustangs	WSHL	36	7	25	32	101	7	1	4	5	14
2014–15	Ogden Mustangs	WSHL	45	6	36	42	81	7	0	1	1	4
2015–16	Milton Keynes Lightning	EPIHL	23	2	6	8	16	—	—	—	—	—
2015–16	Coventry Blaze	EIHL	40	0	4	4	24	4	0	0	0	0
2016–17	Coventry Blaze	EIHL	51	1	4	5	14	—	—	—	—	—
2017–18	Coventry Blaze	EIHL	55	1	8	9	58	2	0	0	0	0
2018–19	Coventry Blaze	EIHL	60	2	10	12	55	2	0	0	0	0
2019–20	Coventry Blaze	EIHL	39	1	5	6	20	—	—	—	—	—
2020–21	Coventry Blaze	Elite Series	14	3	5	8	4	—	—	—	—	—
2021–22	Coventry Blaze	EIHL	50	4	11	15	28	2	0	0	0	0
2022–23	Coventry Blaze	EIHL	54	6	14	20	28	2	0	0	0	0
2023–24	Coventry Blaze	EIHL	52	3	11	14	45	2	0	0	0	0
2024–25	Coventry Blaze	EIHL	53	5	12	17	32	2	0	0	0	2
2025–26	Coventry Blaze	EIHL	53	1	7	8	58	2	0	0	0	0
EIHL totals			507	24	86	110	362	18	0	0	0	2

=== International ===
Year	Team	Event	GP	G	A	Pts	PIM
2011	Great Britain U18	WJC-18 (D1)	4	0	0	0	6
2012	Great Britain U18	WJC-18 (D2)	5	0	3	3	10
2014	Great Britain U20	WJC-20 (D1)	5	0	0	0	4
2021	Great Britain	WC	7	0	0	0	12
2022	Great Britain	WC	6	0	0	0	0
2024	Great Britain	OGQ	3	0	0	0	0
2025	Great Britain	WC (D1A)	5	0	0	0	0
2026	Great Britain	WC	7	1	0	1	2
Junior totals			14	0	3	3	20
Senior totals			28	1	0	1	14
