= Jack Hopkins (ice hockey) =

English ice hockey forward (born 2004)

- Born: May 8, 2004 Nottingham, Nottinghamshire, England
- Height: 181 cm (5 ft 11 in)
- Weight: 71 kg (157 lb; 11 st 3 lb)
- Position: Forward
- Shoots: Right
- EIHL team Former teams: Coventry Blaze; Telford Tigers; Nottingham Panthers; Milton Keynes Lightning
- National team: Great Britain
- Playing career: 2021–present

Jack Hopkins (born 8 May 2004) is an English professional ice hockey player who plays as a forward for the Coventry Blaze in the Elite Ice Hockey League (EIHL) and Great Britain men's national ice hockey team. He has previously played for English teams including the Telford Tigers, Nottingham Panthers and Milton Keynes Lightning, and for the Great Britain men's national junior ice hockey team at U18 and U20 levels.

== Career ==
Hopkins came through the Nottingham youth ice hockey setup, playing for the Nottingham Ice Cats, Nottingham Tigers, Nottingham Lynx, Nottingham Cougars and Nottingham Leopards, before spending a year in Germany, playing for ES Weißwasser U17, in 2020–21. He captained the Great Britain men's national junior ice hockey U18 team and was a top scorer at the IIHF World U18 Championships.

In 2021, Hopkins joined the Telford Tigers in the National Ice Hockey League (NIHL), on a two-way contract from the Nottingham Panthers. He won the NIHL championship with the Telford Tigers in 2021–22 and was Telford’s fourth highest points scorer of the year. Hopkins scored his first goal for Nottingham in a 9-1 win over the Coventry Blaze on 13 April 2022.

He signed full-time for Nottingham on 4 June 2022 and made eight EIHL and six Challenge Cup appearances for the Panthers. He played primarily as a fourth-line centre. Hopkins played for Milton Keynes Lightning in the NIHL for the 2023/2024 season, scoring 6 goals and 10 assists on a two-way contract from the Nottingham Panthers.

Hopkins was named in the Great Britain men's national junior ice hockey team’s U20 roster for the 2022 World Junior Ice Hockey Championships and the 2023 World Junior Ice Hockey Championships. He was part of the GB NextGen Programme.

Hopkins signed for Coventry Blaze in May 2023, alongside defenceman Archie Hazeldine. During the 2024–25 EIHL season, Hopkins was stretchered off the ice while playing against the Belfast Giants, but returned to the team and recorded five goals and 11 assists overall across 66 games. He won the Elite League young British player of the year award.

Hopkins was part of Great Britain's roster during the 2025 IIHF European Cup of Nations in Poland.

During the 2025–26 EIHL season, Hopkins recorded five goals and 16 assists across 66 games. He won the Elite League young British player of the year award for the second year running and won Coventry Blaze’s British player of the season award as voted by fans.

Hopkins was called up for senior Great Britain men's national ice hockey team at the 2026 Men's Ice Hockey World Championships in Switzerland, along with Coventry Blaze goaltender Mat Robson and defenceman David Clements.

In June 2026, Hopkins re-signed with Coventry Blaze for the 2026/2027 EIHL season.

== Career statistics ==
=== Regular season, playoffs, and tournaments ===
			Regular season					Playoffs					Tournaments
Season	Team	League	GP	G	A	Pts	PIM	GP	G	A	Pts	PIM	GP	G	A	Pts	PIM
2021–22	Telford Tigers	NIHL	40	16	33	49	13	2	0	1	1	0	9	1	2	3	0
2021–22	Nottingham Panthers	EIHL	14	1	1	2	0	2	0	0	0	0	5	0	0	0	0
2022–23	Milton Keynes Lightning	NIHL	16	6	10	16	4	—	—	—	—	—	7	2	7	9	2
2022–23	Nottingham Panthers	EIHL	42	0	4	4	8	4	2	0	2	0	7	0	1	1	0
2023–24	Coventry Blaze	EIHL	43	2	1	3	6	2	0	0	0	4	10	0	0	0	5
2024–25	Coventry Blaze	EIHL	54	5	9	14	6	2	0	1	1	0	10	0	1	1	2
2025–26	Coventry Blaze	EIHL	51	3	12	15	12	2	0	0	0	0	13	2	4	6	0
EIHL totals			204	11	27	38	32	12	2	1	3	4	45	2	6	8	7
