= J.J. Piccinich =

American ice hockey player (born 1996)

- Born: June 12, 1996 (age 30) Paramus, New Jersey, U.S.
- Height: 6 ft 0 in (183 cm)
- Weight: 190 lb (86 kg; 13 st 8 lb)
- Position: Right wing
- Shoots: Right
- EIHL team Former teams: Belfast Giants; Orlando Solar Bears; Toronto Marlies; Newfoundland Growlers; San Antonio Rampage; Tulsa Oilers; Stjernen Hockey
- NHL draft: 103rd overall, 2014 NHL Draft
- Playing career: 2017–present

John Piccinich Jr. (born June 12, 1996) is an American professional ice hockey right winger who plays for the Belfast Giants of the Elite Ice Hockey League (EIHL). He was selected by the Toronto Maple Leafs in the fourth round (103rd) overall of the 2014 NHL Entry Draft.

== Playing career ==
Raised in Paramus, New Jersey, Piccinich played prep hockey at Paramus High School. Following his 2-year USHL career playing for the Youngstown Phantoms, Piccinich was selected 103rd overall by the Toronto Maple Leafs in the 2014 NHL Entry Draft. He then enrolled at Boston University, where he played one season of NCAA Division I hockey with the Terriers. During the 2014-15 season, he appeared in 25 games and helped Boston University capture the Hockey East championship and reach the NCAA national championship game.

After his freshman season, Piccinich joined the London Knights of the Ontario Hockey League (OHL). He was a member of the London team that won both the OHL championship and the 2016 Memorial Cup.

Piccinich began his professional career in 2017 with the Toronto Maple Leafs organization. Over the next four seasons, he split time between the American Hockey League (AHL) and the ECHL, playing for the Toronto Marlies, San Antonio Rampage, Orlando Solar Bears, Newfoundland Growlers, and Tulsa Oilers. He was a member of the Newfoundland Growlers team that won the 2019 Kelly Cup Championship.

== Career statistics ==
			Regular season					Playoffs
Season	Team	League	GP	G	A	Pts	PIM	GP	G	A	Pts	PIM
2012–13	Youngstown Phantoms	USHL	63	3	12	15	4	9	1	1	2	0
2013–14	Youngstown Phantoms	USHL	60	27	31	58	31	—	—	—	—	—
2014–15	Boston Univeristy Terriers	NCAA	25	1	3	4	2	—	—	—	—	—
2015–16	London Knights	OHL	66	30	36	66	19	18	2	10	12	4
2016–17	London Knights	OHL	66	26	46	72	24	14	1	2	3	12
2017–18	Orlando Solar Bears	ECHL	69	18	25	43	30	3	2	1	3	2
2018–19	Toronto Marlies	AHL	6	0	1	1	0	—	—	—	—	—
2018–19	Newfoundland Growlers	ECHL	62	9	22	31	30	22	1	4	5	2
2019–20	San Antonio Rampage	AHL	4	0	0	0	4	—	—	—	—	—
2019–20	Tulsa Oilers	ECHL	59	12	42	54	24	—	—	—	—	—
2020–21	Orlando Solar Bears	ECHL	65	11	18	29	20	—	—	—	—	—
2021–22	Belfast Giants	EIHL	52	35	45	80	22	4	1	0	1	4
2022–23	Stjernen Hockey	Norway	45	25	40	65	24	1	0	1	1	0
2023–24	Stjernen Hockey	Norway	42	20	35	55	12	5	6	2	8	2
2024–25	Belfast Giants	EIHL	54	22	29	51	16	4	1	0	1	4
2025–26	Belfast Giants	EIHL	53	16	34	50	6	2	0	0	0	0
AHL totals			10	0	1	1	4	—	—	—	—	—
