= 2026–27 EIHL season =

- League: Elite Ice Hockey League
- Sport: Ice hockey
- Duration: 12 September 2026 – 18 April 2027

EIHL seasons
- 2025–26 2027–28

The 2026–27 EIHL season is the 23rd season of the Elite Ice Hockey League (EIHL), the highest level of domestic ice hockey played in the United Kingdom. The league is running three separate competitions which are being played between 12 September 2026 and 18 April 2027. The Belfast Giants are defending the League Championship. The Nottingham Panthers are defending the Challenge Cup cup. The Cardiff Devils are defending the Playoff title.

Starting this season, the Challenge Cup elimination game and semi-finals will not include shootouts, they will instead have a full 20-minute period of 5-on-5 sudden-death overtime followed by continuous periods of 3-on-3 sudden-death overtime until the winning goal is scored (if required). The playoff quarter-finals second leg and semi-finals will also work under this format.

== Teams ==
The same ten teams that competed in the 2025–26 EIHL season are competing in the 2026–27 season.

The Manchester Storm changed arena for the season; having played at Planet Ice Altrincham since their formation in 2015, the Storm moved into the AO Arena – where the original Manchester Storm had previously played in the Ice Hockey Superleague between 1995 and 2002.

Three games will also be played at the OVO Hydro in Glasgow on 30 and 31 December, as part of the "Ice Hockey at the Hydro" event. All three Scottish teams will form part of the fixtures along with the Belfast Giants – the last match of which, between the Glasgow Clan and the Dundee Stars, will be held as the Scotia Quaich.

Team	City/Town	Arena	Capacity
Belfast Giants	(Northern Ireland) Belfast	The O2 Belfast	8,700
Cardiff Devils	(Wales) Cardiff	Vindico Arena	3,250
Coventry Blaze	(England) Coventry	Planet Ice Coventry	3,000
Dundee Stars	(Scotland) Dundee	Dundee Ice Arena	2,700
Fife Flyers	(Scotland) Kirkcaldy	Fife Ice Arena	3,525
Glasgow Clan	(Scotland) Glasgow	Braehead Arena	4,000
Guildford Flames	(England) Guildford	Guildford Spectrum	2,200
Manchester Storm	(England) Manchester	AO Arena	21,000
Nottingham Panthers	(England) Nottingham	Motorpoint Arena Nottingham	7,500
Sheffield Steelers	(England) Sheffield	Utilita Arena Sheffield	9,512

== Regular season ==
=== League standings ===
Each team plays fifty-four games, playing each of the other nine teams six times: three times on home ice, and three times away from home. Points are awarded for each game: two points for all victories, regardless of whether it was in regulation time or after overtime or game-winning shots, one point for losing in overtime or game-winning shots, and zero points for losing in regulation time. At the end of the regular season, the team that finishes with the most points will be crowned league champions. The top eight teams will qualify for the playoffs.

Pos	Team	Pld	W	OTW	OTL	L	GF	GA	GD	Pts	
1	Cardiff Devils	13	6	4	1	2	42	26	+16	21	Qualification to playoffs
2	Coventry Blaze	13	8	1	0	4	44	27	+17	18	Qualification to playoffs
3	Sheffield Steelers	14	7	0	4	3	49	39	+10	18	Qualification to playoffs
4	Manchester Storm	15	6	1	4	4	43	43	0	18	Qualification to playoffs
5	Belfast Giants	10	6	2	0	2	35	23	+12	16	Qualification to playoffs
6	Nottingham Panthers	11	7	0	1	3	33	31	+2	15	Qualification to playoffs
7	Fife Flyers	14	2	4	1	7	41	42	−1	13	Qualification to playoffs
8	Guildford Flames	14	4	0	1	9	43	64	−21	9	Qualification to playoffs
9	Glasgow Clan	12	3	1	0	8	23	34	−11	8	
10	Dundee Stars	10	0	1	2	7	22	46	−24	4	

Updated to match(es) played on 22 November 2026. Source: Elite League
Rules for classification:
- In-season: 1) Points; 2) Fewest games played; end of season criteria as below.
- End of season: 1) Points; 2) Games won in regulation time; 3) Number of games won; 4) Head-to-head results, ranked by criteria 1 to 3; 5) Fewest regulation losses; 6) Away game results, ranked by criteria 1 to 3; 7) Goals scored; 8) Goal difference; 9) Fewest penalty minutes; 10) Drawing of lots.

== Challenge Cup ==
The Challenge Cup is split into two stages: an initial group stage where the league's ten teams were divided into two groups based on geographical distance – one group of six teams (Group A) and a group of four teams (Group B). The teams in Group A (the five English teams and the Cardiff Devils) played each of the other teams twice for a total of ten games, while the teams in Group B (the three Scottish teams and the Belfast Giants) played each of the other teams four times for a total of twelve games.

The top two teams in Group A and the winners of Group B qualified for the semi-finals. The runners-up in Group B are scheduled to play the third-placed team in Group A in a semi-final playoff game, held at the arena of the team with a higher group stage points percentage to determine the final semi-finalist.

=== Group stage ===
==== Group A ====
Pos	Team	Pld	W	OTW	OTL	L	GF	GA	GD	Pts	Qualification
1	Sheffield Steelers	10	4	3	0	3	34	23	+11	14	Qualification to semi-finals
2	Cardiff Devils	10	5	1	1	3	29	27	+2	13	Qualification to semi-finals
3	Guildford Flames	10	4	1	2	3	34	31	+3	12	Qualification to elimination game
4	Nottingham Panthers	10	3	2	2	3	28	30	−2	12	
5	Coventry Blaze	10	3	1	1	5	25	33	−8	9	
6	Manchester Storm	10	2	1	3	4	28	34	−6	9	

Source: Elite League
Rules for classification: 1) Points; 2) Games won in regulation time; 3) Number of games won; 4) Head-to-head results, ranked by criteria 1 to 3; 5) Fewest regulation losses; 6) Away game results, ranked by criteria 1 to 3; 7) Goals scored; 8) Goal difference; 9) Fewest penalty minutes; 10) Drawing of lots.

===== Results =====
Home \ Away	CAR	COV	GUI	MAN	NOT	SHE
Cardiff Devils		5–4 (OT)	3–1	4–2	5–3	1–0
Coventry Blaze	3–2		3–5	3–5	2–1 (SO)	4–2
Guildford Flames	5–1	2–1		4–3 (SO)	3–6	4–5 (SO)
Manchester Storm	4–3 (SO)	1–2	4–3		1–2 (SO)	3–4
Nottingham Panthers	2–4	4–3	1–4	4–3 (SO)		3–2
Sheffield Steelers	3–1	6–0	4–3 (SO)	5–2	3–2 (OT)	

Source: Elite League
Legend: Blue = home team win; Yellow = draw; Red = away team win.

==== Group B ====
Pos	Team	Pld	W	OTW	OTL	L	GF	GA	GD	Pts	Qualification
1	Belfast Giants	12	7	2	1	2	44	19	+25	19	Qualification to semi-finals
2	Fife Flyers	12	4	3	1	4	35	38	−3	15	Qualification to elimination game
3	Glasgow Clan	12	3	1	5	3	35	38	−3	13	
4	Dundee Stars	12	2	2	1	7	26	45	−19	9	

Source: Elite League
Rules for classification: 1) Points; 2) Games won in regulation time; 3) Number of games won; 4) Head-to-head results, ranked by criteria 1 to 3; 5) Fewest regulation losses; 6) Away game results, ranked by criteria 1 to 3; 7) Goals scored; 8) Goal difference; 9) Fewest penalty minutes; 10) Drawing of lots.

===== Results =====
Home \ Away	BEL	DUN	FIF	GLA
Belfast Giants		8–1	6–0	4–1
Belfast Giants		4–0	5–2	2–1 (OT)
Dundee Stars	1–4		1–4	5–3
Dundee Stars	1–3		2–3	3–2 (SO)
Fife Flyers	3–2	3–2 (OT)		3–4 (SO)
Fife Flyers	3–2 (SO)	3–4		4–3 (OT)
Glasgow Clan	2–3 (SO)	5–6 (OT)	1–4	
Glasgow Clan	4–1	3–0	6–3	

Source: Elite League
Legend: Blue = home team win; Yellow = draw; Red = away team win.
