= Jordan Kawaguchi =

Canadian ice hockey player (born 1997)

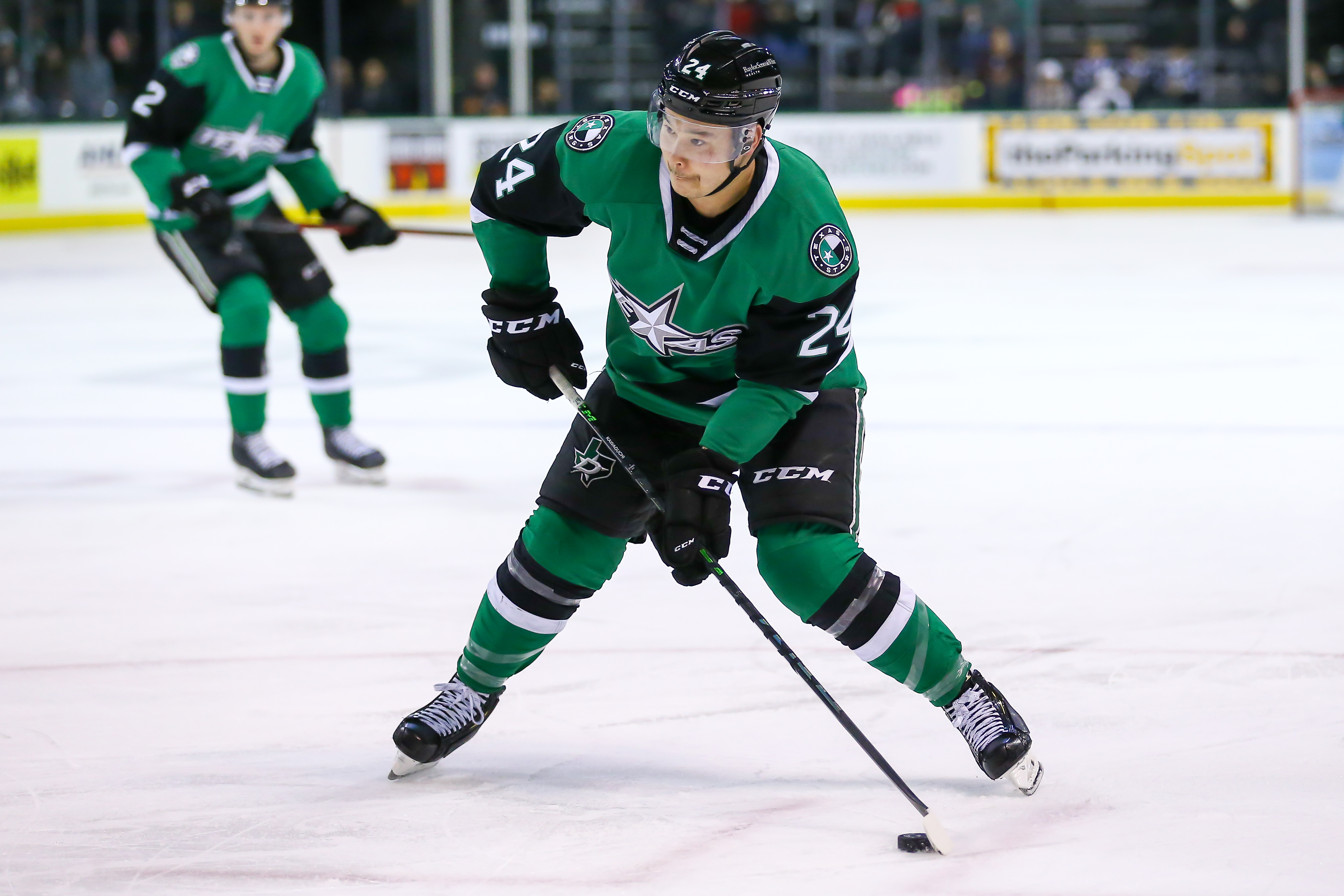
- Kawaguchi with the Texas Stars in 2022
- Born: May 4, 1997 (age 29) Abbotsford, British Columbia, Canada
- Height: 5 ft 9 in (175 cm)
- Weight: 185 lb (84 kg; 13 st 3 lb)
- Position: Centre
- Shoots: Left
- EIHL team Former teams: Belfast Giants; Texas Stars; Idaho Steelheads
- NHL draft: Undrafted
- Playing career: 2021–2023; 2024–present

Jordan Kawaguchi (born May 4, 1997) is a Canadian professional ice hockey centre for the Belfast Giants of the Elite Ice Hockey League (EIHL).

== Early life ==
Kawaguchi was born on May 4, 1997, in Abbotsford, British Columbia to parents Todd and Brandy Kawaguchi. His father Todd was the only son of Japanese immigrant parents and he played college ice hockey at the University of British Columbia. He is the cousin of Devin Setoguchi, who played nine seasons in the National Hockey League.

== Playing career ==
Growing up in British Columbia, Kawaguchi played for the Abbotsford Minor Hockey Association before joining the U15 Pursuit of Excellence prep program in Kelowna. While playing with the U15 prep team, he recorded 57 goals and 74 assists for 131 points in 43 games and was named Tournament MVP at the Kamloops International Ice Hockey Tournament. As a result, Kawaguchi was drafted in the fourth round, 80th overall, by the Spokane Chiefs in the Western Hockey League (WHL) Bantam Draft. However, he committed to play for the Chilliwack Chiefs in the British Columbia Hockey League (BCHL) for the 2012–13 season, where he recorded nine goals and nine assists as the team finished last in the Mainland Division. Kawaguchi spent four complete seasons with the Chiefs, where he increased his offensive output from his rookie season. He finished his BCHL career with 120 goals and 242 points in 213 career games while also earning BCHL All-Star honors.

Kawaguchi originally committed to play collegiate ice hockey with Providence College but changed to the University of North Dakota of the National Collegiate Hockey Conference.

After his junior season with the North Dakota Fighting Hawks, Kawaguchi was named to the AHCA First All-American Team.

Kawaguchi was named captain in his senior season with the Fighting Hawks, leading the team in scoring and placing fourth in the NCAA with 36 points through 28 games in the shortened 2020–21 season.

As an undrafted free agent, Kawaguchi turned professional in agreeing to a one-year, entry-level contract with the Dallas Stars on March 31, 2021. He was assigned by the Stars to join AHL affiliate, the Texas Stars.

On August 1, 2022, Kawaguchi as a free agent opted to remain within the Stars organization by signing a one-year AHL contract to continue with the Texas Stars for the 2022–23 season, spending it with the Stars' ECHL affiliate, the Idaho Steelheads.

Kawaguchi announced his retirement in November 2023 after an injury-laden 2022–23 ECHL season in which he sustained three concussions, a broken thumb, and a torn MCL. This retirement was ultimately short-lived, as Kawaguchi re-signed with the Steelheads and returned to ice hockey on January 17, 2024.

Following his first three full professional seasons in North America, Kawaguchi moved abroad as free agent and signed a one-year contract with the Belfast Giants of the EIHL on July 29, 2024. Kawaguchi remained with the Giants for the 2025–26 and 2026–27 seasons, signing successive one-year contracts.

== Career statistics ==
			Regular season					Playoffs
Season	Team	League	GP	G	A	Pts	PIM	GP	G	A	Pts	PIM
2012–13	West Kelowna Warriors	BCHL	2	0	0	0	0	—	—	—	—	—
2013–14	Chilliwack Chiefs	BCHL	49	9	9	18	6	—	—	—	—	—
2014–15	Chilliwack Chiefs	BCHL	53	28	28	56	11	12	5	10	15	8
2015–16	Chilliwack Chiefs	BCHL	56	45	38	83	29	20	12	12	24	2
2016–17	Chilliwack Chiefs	BCHL	55	38	47	85	32	23	18	25	43	4
2017–18	University of North Dakota	NCHC	38	5	14	19	12	—	—	—	—	—
2018–19	University of North Dakota	NCHC	37	10	16	26	21	—	—	—	—	—
2019–20	University of North Dakota	NCHC	33	15	30	45	8	—	—	—	—	—
2020–21	University of North Dakota	NCHC	28	10	26	36	24	—	—	—	—	—
2020–21	Texas Stars	AHL	3	1	1	2	0	—	—	—	—	—
2021–22	Texas Stars	AHL	49	6	17	23	6	2	0	0	0	0
2022–23	Idaho Steelheads	ECHL	58	26	26	52	33	16	4	10	14	6
2023–24	Idaho Steelheads	ECHL	29	8	23	31	28	9	4	4	8	6
2024–25	Belfast Giants	EIHL	50	17	20	37	12	4	2	2	4	0
2025–26	Belfast Giants	EIHL	53	24	23	47	8	2	0	1	1	0
AHL totals			52	7	18	25	6	2	0	0	0	0

== Awards and honors ==
Award	Year	Ref
BCHL
Second All-Star Team	2016	
First All-Star Team	2017	
NCAA
AHCA First Team All-American	2020	
NCHC First All-Star Team	2020, 2021	
NCHC Forward of the Year	2020	
NCHC Three Stars Award	2020	
West First All-American Team	2020	
Hobey Baker Award Finalist	2020	
AHCA West Second Team All-American	2021	
EIHL
EIHL Challenge Cup	2024–25	

Awards and achievements
Preceded by Patrick Newell	NCHC Forward of the Year; 2019–20	Succeeded by Shane Pinto
Preceded by Hunter Shepard	NCHC Three Stars Award; 2019–20; With: Scott Perunovich	Succeeded by Ludvig Persson
