= Eamon McAdam =

American ice hockey player (born 1994)

- Born: September 24, 1994 (age 31) Perkasie, Pennsylvania, U.S.
- Height: 6 ft 3 in (191 cm)
- Weight: 198 lb (90 kg; 14 st 2 lb)
- Position: Goaltender
- Catches: Left
- EIHL team Former teams: Sheffield Steelers; Bridgeport Sound Tigers; Toronto Marlies; Esbjerg Energy; Guildford Flames
- NHL draft: 70th overall, 2013; New York Islanders
- Playing career: 2016–present

Eamon McAdam (born September 24, 1994) is an American professional ice hockey goaltender who is currently playing for the Sheffield Steelers in the Elite Ice Hockey League (EIHL).

== Playing career ==
=== Amateur ===
McAdam began his junior career with the Austin Bruins of the North American Hockey League before moving on to play parts of three seasons with the Waterloo Black Hawks of the United States Hockey League, where he became the team's joint starter. McAdam won gold medal with the U.S. Junior Select team at the 2012 World Junior A Challenge in Yarmouth, Nova Scotia as well as silver medal with the Black Hawks at the 2012 Junior Club World Cup in Omsk, Russia. McAdam was named MVP in the 2013 USHL/NHL Top Prospects Game.

McAdam was recruited by Penn State as one of their first recruits after they announced their new Division I hockey program, after being scouted by assistant coach Keith Fisher. McAdam scored four assists in the 2015–16 season, the most for any goaltender across the NCAA that season, and was named to the All-Big Ten Second Team.

=== Professional ===
McAdam was selected by the New York Islanders in the third round (70th overall) of the 2013 NHL Entry Draft. After his junior year at Penn State, McAdam signed a three-year entry-level contract with the Islanders on March 23, 2016. He played his first professional game on April 17, 2016, for New York's American Hockey League (AHL) affiliate, the Bridgeport Sound Tigers, in the final game of their season.

McAdam began the 2016–17 season winning each of his first seven starts, including his first professional victory on November 11, 2016, against the Lehigh Valley Phantoms. and would split the rest of the season between the Sound Tigers and New York's ECHL affiliate, the Missouri Mavericks.

On July 3, 2018, McAdam was traded from the Islanders to the Toronto Maple Leafs in exchange for forward Matt Martin. Less than a month into 2018–19 McAdam was called up to the Maple Leafs to serve as backup after Frederik Andersen and Kasimir Kaskisuo both suffered injuries and Curtis McElhinney and Calvin Pickard were claimed off waivers by other teams, leaving the Maple Leafs goaltending depth very thin, though he would not see game action. McAdam split the remainder of the season with the AHL's Toronto Marlies and ECHL's Newfoundland Growlers.

After the completion of his entry-level contract, the Maple Leafs chose not to qualify McAdam making him an unrestricted free agent. He spent the next two seasons playing in the ECHL with the Adirondack Thunder and Jacksonville Icemen.

On October 19, 2021, McAdam signed a one-year contract with the Esbjerg Energy of the Danish Metal Ligaen. On June 14, 2022, McAdam signed a one-year deal with the Guildford Flames of the British Elite Ice Hockey League, extending for a second and third year on June 5, 2023.

McAdam joined the 3-on-3 professional summer ice hockey league 3ICE for its inaugural season in 2022, being drafted to Team Murphy. In his second season with the team, Team Murphy won the championship Patrick Cup and McAdam won the league's Goalie of the Year award.

After three seasons with the Guildford Flames, Eamon would move up north to join the Sheffield Steelers.

== Personal life ==
McAdam was born in Perkasie, Pennsylvania on September 24, 1994. His father, Bryan, played Division I lacrosse at Bucknell University, and his mother played university basketball and track. McAdam grew up as a fan of the Philadelphia Flyers and played competitive lacrosse. While at Pennsylvania State University, McAdam studied economics, and energy business and finance.

== Career statistics ==
=== Regular season and playoffs ===
| | | | Regular season | | | | | | | | | Playoffs |
| Season | Team | League | GP | W | L | OTL | MIN | GA | SO | GAA | SV% | GP | W | L | MIN | GA | SO | GAA | SV% |
|---|---|---|---|---|---|---|---|---|---|---|---|---|---|---|---|---|---|---|---|
| 2009–10 | Team Comcast AAA | AYHL | 23 | — | — | — | — | — | — | 2.47 | .920 | — | — | — | — | — | — | — | — |
| 2010–11 | Austin Bruins | NAHL | 9 | — | — | — | — | — | — | 3.32 | .904 | — | — | — | — | — | — | — | — |
| 2010–11 | Waterloo Black Hawks | USHL | 4 | 2 | 2 | 0 | 190 | 11 | 0 | 3.48 | .888 | — | — | — | — | — | — | — | — |
| 2011–12 | Waterloo Black Hawks | USHL | 23 | 10 | 7 | 0 | 1149 | 67 | 0 | 3.50 | .882 | — | — | — | — | — | — | — | — |
| 2012–13 | Waterloo Black Hawks | USHL | 31 | 14 | 9 | 2 | 1807 | 104 | 2 | 3.45 | .896 | 2 | 0 | 1 | 94 | 5 | 0 | 3.22 | .922 |
| 2013–14 | Penn State Nittany Lions | B1G | 10 | 0 | 9 | 0 | 558 | 38 | 0 | 4.09 | .882 | — | — | — | — | — | — | — | — |
| 2014–15 | Penn State Nittany Lions | B1G | 12 | 5 | 4 | 1 | 653 | 34 | 0 | 3.13 | .910 | — | — | — | — | — | — | — | — |
| 2015–16 | Penn State Nittany Lions | B1G | 22 | 13 | 8 | 1 | 1210 | 60 | 1 | 2.98 | .913 | — | — | — | — | — | — | — | — |
| 2015–16 | Bridgeport Sound Tigers | AHL | 1 | 0 | 1 | 0 | 60 | 6 | 0 | 6.00 | .829 | — | — | — | — | — | — | — | — |
| 2016–17 | Missouri Mavericks | ECHL | 17 | 11 | 3 | 1 | 943 | 49 | 1 | 3.12 | .916 | — | — | — | — | — | — | — | — |
| 2016–17 | Bridgeport Sound Tigers | AHL | 26 | 15 | 8 | 0 | 1408 | 68 | 0 | 2.90 | .897 | — | — | — | — | — | — | — | — |
| 2017–18 | Worcester Railers | ECHL | 29 | 13 | 10 | 6 | 1690 | 80 | 0 | 2.84 | .910 | 4 | — | — | — | — | — | 2.01 | .934 |
| 2017–18 | Bridgeport Sound Tigers | AHL | 9 | 5 | 2 | 0 | 391 | 18 | 0 | 2.77 | .903 | — | — | — | — | — | — | — | — |
| 2018–19 | Newfoundland Growlers | ECHL | 19 | 10 | 5 | 2 | 1098 | 48 | 2 | 2.62 | .911 | — | — | — | — | — | — | — | — |
| 2018–19 | Toronto Marlies | AHL | 19 | 9 | 5 | 5 | 1085 | 54 | 1 | 2.99 | .897 | — | — | — | — | — | — | — | — |
| 2019–20 | Adirondack Thunder | ECHL | 40 | 15 | 19 | 4 | 2324 | 126 | 2 | 3.25 | .893 | — | — | — | — | — | — | — | — |
| 2020–21 | Jacksonville Icemen | ECHL | 8 | 4 | 2 | 2 | 452 | 19 | 0 | 2.53 | .915 | — | — | — | — | — | — | — | — |
| 2021–22 | Esbjerg Energy | Metal Ligaen | 17 | — | — | — | 903 | 49 | — | 2.88 | .914 | — | — | — | — | — | — | — | — |
| 2022 | Team Murphy | 3ICE | 17 | 8 | 9 | — | 272 | 60 | — | 3.53 | .789 | 2 | 0 | 2 | 119 | 10 | 0 | 5.04 | .841 |
| 2022–23 | Guildford Flames | EIHL | 32 | 21 | 11 | 0 | 1925 | 96 | 0 | 2.99 | .907 | 1 | 0 | 1 | 60 | 4 | 0 | 4.00 | .867 |
| 2023 | Team Murphy | 3ICE | 8 | 7 | 1 | — | 128 | 18 | — | 2.25 | .849 | — | — | — | — | — | — | — |
| 2023–24 | Guildford Flames | EIHL | 30 | 14 | 15 | 0 | 1790 | 75 | 2 | 2.51 | .919 | — | — | — | — | — | — | — | — |
| 2024–25 | Guildford Flames | EIHL | 27 | 12 | 15 | 0 | 1607 | 83 | 0 | 3.10 | .911 | 2 | 1 | 1 | 118 | 7 | 0 | 3.56 | .907 |
| 2025–26 | Sheffield Steelers | EIHL | 19 | 12 | 7 | 0 | 1146 | 42 | 2 | 2.20 | .927 | — | — | — | — | — | — | — | — |
| AHL totals | | | 55 | 29 | 16 | 5 | 2942 | 146 | 1 | 2.98 | .896 | — | — | — | — | — | — | — | — |

=== International ===
| Year | Team | Event | Result | GP | W | L | OT | MIN | GA | SO | GAA | SV% |
|---|---|---|---|---|---|---|---|---|---|---|---|---|
| 2012 | United States | WJAC | 1st place, gold medalist(s) | 4 | 4 | 0 | 0 | 220 | 8 | 0 | 2.18 | .907 |

== Awards and honors ==
| Award | Year |
USHL
| USHL/NHL Top Prospects Game MVP | 2013 |
College
| All-Big Ten Second Team | 2016 |
| Penn State Nittany Lions most assists, season (goaltender) | 2016 |
ECHL
| Goaltender of the Week (February 6) | 2017 |
| Goaltender of the Month (February) | 2018 |
| Kelly Cup champion | 2018 |
3ICE
| Patrick Cup Champion | 2023 |
| Grant Fuhr Goalie of the Year Award | 2023 |
International
| World Junior A Challenge gold medal | 2012 |
