= Sami Aittokallio =

Finnish ice hockey player (born 1992)

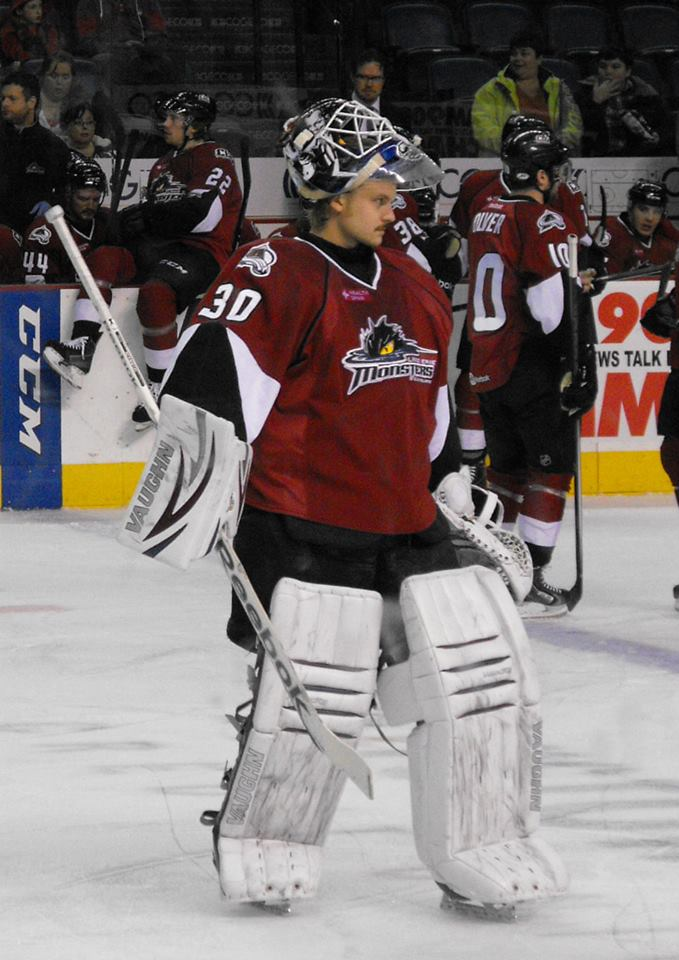
- Aittokallio with Lake Erie Monsters during 2013–14 AHL season
- Born: 6 August 1992 (age 33) Tampere, Finland
- Height: 6 ft 1 in (185 cm)
- Weight: 185 lb (84 kg; 13 st 3 lb)
- Position: Goaltender
- Catches: Left
- PHL team Former teams: TH Unia Oświęcim; Ilves; Colorado Avalanche; Oulun Kärpät; HC Sparta Praha; Vaasan Sport; Ässät; Bietigheim Steelers; JYP Jyväskylä; HK Nitra; Glasgow Clan
- NHL draft: 107th overall, 2010; Colorado Avalanche
- Playing career: 2010–present

Sami Aittokallio (born 6 August 1992) is a Finnish professional ice hockey goaltender who currently plays for TH Unia Oświęcim of the Polska Hokej Liga (PHL). He has formerly played with the Colorado Avalanche of the National Hockey League (NHL).

== Playing career ==
Aittokallio was selected in the fourth round, 107th overall by the Colorado Avalanche in the 2010 NHL entry draft. Despite ranked as the number one European Goalie before the draft, he was the seventh goaltender taken.

In the 2009–10 season, Aittokallio made his debut in the SM-liiga as a 17-year-old playing in one game for Ilves. As well as representing Ilves in junior, Aittokallio spent a portion of the season on loan with Lempäälän Kisa in the Mestis league. On 12 April 2010, Aittokallio signed a two-year contract extension to remain with Ilves, his original team as a youth. In each season, he continued to split the year between Ilves youth team, LeKi and in the 2010–11 SM-liiga season, he played a career high 16 games for 5 wins.

After fulfilling his junior eligibility and his commitment to Ilves, Aittokallio was signed to a three-year entry-level contract with the Avalanche on 11 May 2012.

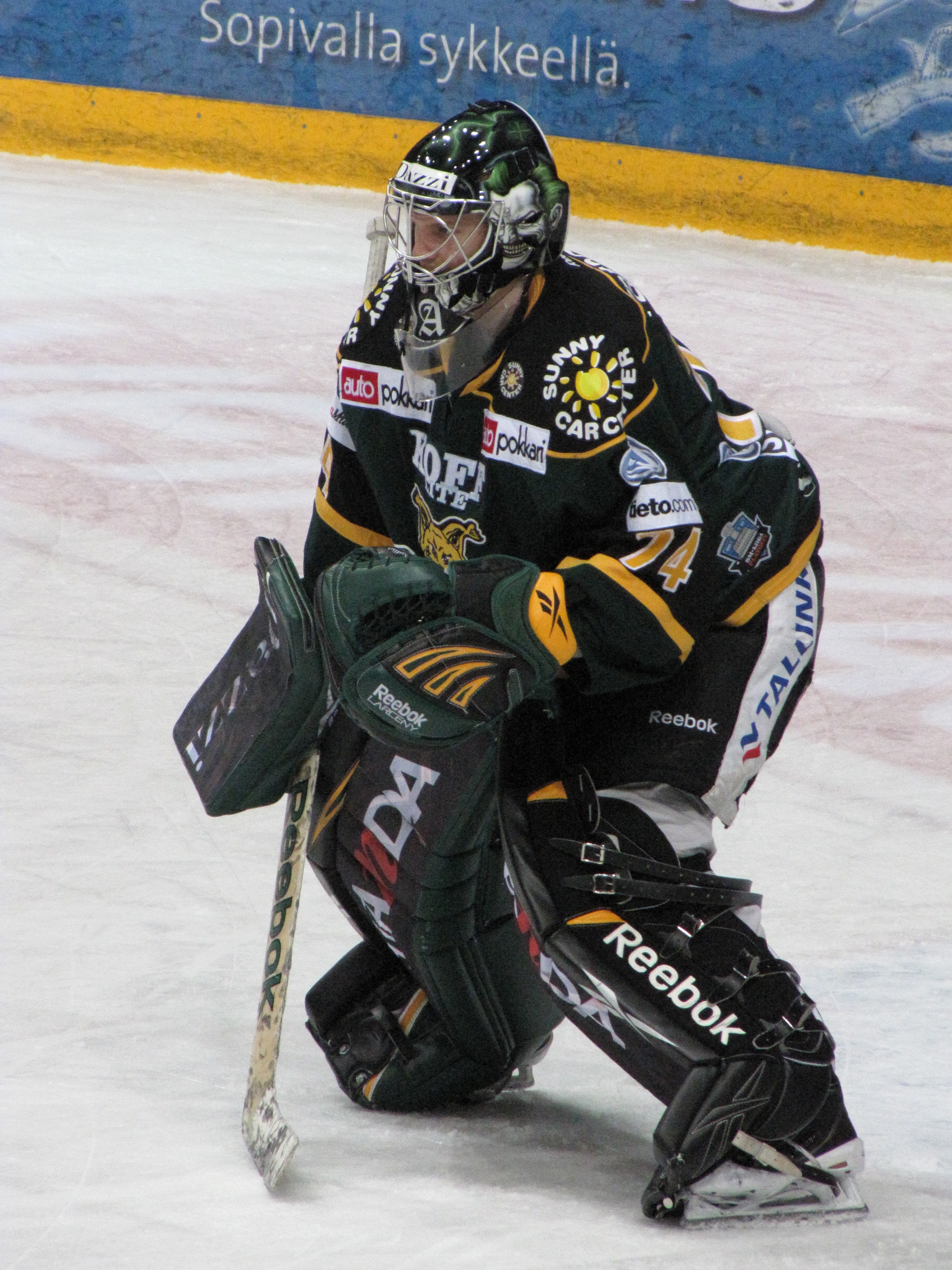
Aittokallio playing in Finland.

After 26 games with the Monsters, Aittokallio received his first NHL recall to the Avalanche during the lockout shortened 2012–13 season, to fill the back-up position after an injury to starting goaltender Semyon Varlamov on 9 April 2013. On 11 April 2013, he made his NHL debut against the Los Angeles Kings, becoming the youngest since Marc Denis to start for the Avalanche. Aittokallio failed to complete the game after suffering from dehydration with the game tied midway through the third period, and was replaced in the eventual shootout loss by veteran Jean-Sébastien Giguère.

In the 2014–15 season, Aittokallio suffered from injury and indifferent form, playing with the Monsters and the Fort Wayne Komets of the ECHL.

Despite being tendered a qualifying offer by the Avalanche, Aittokallio opted to return to Finland to further his development in signing a two-year contract with Liiga club, Oulun Kärpät on 2 July 2015. Later in the off-season on 25 August 2015, it was announced that Aittokallio agreed to a one-year contract to keep within Avalanche organization, with a European clause allowing the continuance of his contract with Kärpät.

After two seasons with Kärpät, Aittokallio left the club and Finland in signing a one-year deal with Czech club, HC Sparta Praha of the Czech Extraliga on May 13, 2017. In the 2017–18 season, Aittokallio had a successful stint the Czech Republic, collecting 15 wins in a starting role through 28 games.

On April 13, 2018, Aittokallio returned to the Finnish Liiga, signing a one-year deal with his third topflight Finnish club, Vaasan Sport. In the 2018–19 season, Aittokallio was unable to reproduce the heights of previous seasons statistically, collecting 9 wins in 30 games and finishing with 3.10 goals against average as Sport narrowly missed out on the wild-card round.

Having left Sport, Aittokallio agreed to a two-year contract with his fourth Liiga outfit, Ässät Pori, on May 10, 2019.

Following two seasons with Ässät, Aittokallio left the Liiga, in signing a one-year deal with newly promoted German club, Bietigheim Steelers of the DEL, on 5 July 2021.

Aittokallio remained with the Steelers for two seasons before returning to the Finnish Liiga, to commence the 2023–24 season, with JYP Jyväskylä on a trial contract on 22 September 2023. He made 1 appearance with JYP before the conclusion of his trial contract and was later signed for the remainder of the season with Slovak Extraliga club, HK Nitra, on 13 November 2023.

On 29 May 2025, Aittokallio signed a one-year contract to play with the Scottish-based Glasgow Clan in the British Elite Ice Hockey League. He collected 16 wins through 30 regular season appearances in his lone season with the Clan.

As a free agent following the conclusion of his contract with the Clan, Aittokallio was signed to a one-year contract with Polish club, TH Unia Oświęcim of the PHL, on 9 June 2026.

== International play ==
Medal record

Representing Finland

ice hockey

IIHF World U18 Championship
Bronze medal – third place	2010 Belarus	

Aittokallio was first selected to represent Finland at the 2009 World U-17 Hockey Challenge tournament organised by Hockey Canada. With an understrength team, Aittokallio mirrored the Finnish team and went winless in three games for the tournament to finish tenth out of ten. Touted for his hockey intelligence, good reflexes and athleticism, Aittokallio was selected to be first choice goaltender for Finland at the 2010 World Under-18 Championships in Minsk, Belarus. Sami, however, missed the tournament after suffering an ankle injury as Finland went on to defend their Bronze medal against Russia.

Aittokallio was selected to serve as the backup goaltender to Joni Ortio for Finland at the 2011 World Junior Championships. He made a solitary appearance in relief for Ortio, playing the third period of a 6–0 victory over Slovakia on 31 December 2010.

Aittokallio returned for the 2012 World Junior Championships, and was Finland's starting goaltender, with Christopher Gibson serving as his back-up. In Finland's semifinal against Sweden, Aittokallio made 56 saves, but ultimately, Finland lost 2–3 in a shootout. Aittokallio was named Finland's player of the game with his impressive performance. Following that loss, they played in the bronze medal game against Canada, which they lost 0–4. However, Finland recorded their best performance in the World Juniors since 2006 with their 4th-place exit and Aittokallio was subsequently selected in Finland's top three players for the tournament.

== Career statistics ==
=== Regular season and playoffs ===
			Regular season									Playoffs
Season	Team	League	GP	W	L	T/OT	MIN	GA	SO	GAA	SV%	GP	W	L	MIN	GA	SO	GAA	SV%
2009–10	Ilves	SM-l	1	0	0	0	1	0	0	0.00	1.000	—	—	—	—	—	—	—	—
2010–11	Ilves	SM-l	16	5	8	0	790	36	1	2.73	.909	2	0	2	116	5	0	2.57	.911
2011–12	Ilves	SM-l	11	1	6	3	596	28	0	2.82	.910	—	—	—	—	—	—	—	—
2012–13	Lake Erie Monsters	AHL	27	14	12	1	1540	77	1	3.00	.899	—	—	—	—	—	—	—	—
2012–13	Colorado Avalanche	NHL	1	0	0	0	49	2	0	2.45	.920	—	—	—	—	—	—	—	—
2013–14	Lake Erie Monsters	AHL	36	15	15	3	2060	91	4	2.65	.909	—	—	—	—	—	—	—	—
2013–14	Colorado Avalanche	NHL	1	0	1	0	40	3	0	4.50	.833	—	—	—	—	—	—	—	—
2014–15	Lake Erie Monsters	AHL	16	7	5	1	809	43	0	3.19	.900	—	—	—	—	—	—	—	—
2014–15	Fort Wayne Komets	ECHL	4	3	1	0	245	20	0	4.90	.823	—	—	—	—	—	—	—	—
2015–16	Kärpät	Liiga	33	18	4	9	1922	63	2	1.97	.920	3	1	1	149	4	0	1.61	.931
2016–17	Kärpät	Liiga	16	1	7	5	821	33	1	2.41	.913	—	—	—	—	—	—	—	—
2017–18	HC Sparta Praha	ELH	28	15	10	3	1580	62	1	2.35	.918	3	0	3	170	10	0	3.53	.870
2018–19	Vaasan Sport	Liiga	30	9	9	9	1691	93	0	3.10	.895	—	—	—	—	—	—	—	—
2019–20	Ässät	Liiga	25	9	10	3	1291	51	2	2.37	.904	—	—	—	—	—	—	—	—
2020–21	Ässät	Liiga	17	2	6	5	893	52	2	3.50	.878	—	—	—	—	—	—	—	—
2021–22	Bietigheim Steelers	DEL	32	16	12	0	1737	84	1	2.90	.923	—	—	—	—	—	—	—	—
2022–23	Bietigheim Steelers	DEL	27	5	20	0	1521	85	1	3.35	.907	—	—	—	—	—	—	—	—
2023–24	JYP Jyväskylä	Liiga	1	1	0	0	60	3	0	3.00	.889	—	—	—	—	—	—	—	—
2023–24	HK Nitra	Slovak	17	7	7	3	940	41	0	2.62	.909	14	9	5	752	33	0	2.86	.917
2024–25	HK Nitra	Slovak	29	18	9	2	1660	80	0	2.89	.916	8	4	4	465	19	0	2.45	.924
2025–26	Glasgow Clan	EIHL	30	16	13	0	1709	74	1	2.60	.915	3	1	2	183	4	0	1.31	.960
Liiga totals			150	46	50	34	8,065	359	8	2.67	.904	5	1	3	265	9	0	2.04	.921
NHL totals			2	0	1	0	89	5	0	3.36	.884	—	—	—	—	—	—	—	—

=== International ===
Year	Team	Event	Result	GP	W	L	T	MIN	GA	SO	GAA	SV%
2009	Finland	U17	10th	3	0	3	0	153	16	0	6.27	.792
2011	Finland	WJC	6th	1	0	0	0	20	0	0	0.00	1.000
2012	Finland	WJC	4th	5	3	2	0	310	13	1	2.52	.937
Junior totals				9	3	5	0	483	29	1	3.60	.920
