= Didrik Henbrant =

Swedish ice hockey player

- Born: April 10, 1998 (age 28) Sturefors, Sweden
- Height: 5 ft 10 in (178 cm)
- Weight: 181 lb (82 kg; 12 st 13 lb)
- Position: Forward
- Shoots: Left
- Metal Ligaen team Former teams: Odense Bulldogs; Linköpings HC; Nottingham Panthers
- Playing career: 2016–present

Didrik Henbrant (born April 10, 1998) is a Swedish ice hockey player. He is currently playing with Odense Bulldogs of the Metal Ligaen.

== Career ==
Born in Sturefors, Sweden, Henbrant played junior hockey with local team Linköpings HC. In 2012–13, he debuted at the under-16 level as a 15-year-old, playing fifteenth games in the J16 Elit. He also competed with a regional all-star team from Östergötland in the annual TV-pucken, an under-15 national tournament, in 2013 and 2014. The following season he dressed for 13 U-18 games, recording 5 goals. In 2013–14, Henbrant played 14 games with Linköpings HC's J20 SuperElit team. In 2016–17, Henbrant was promoted to Linköpings HC's senior team, where he made his Swedish Hockey League debut against HV71.

== Career statistics ==
=== Regular season and playoffs ===
			Regular season					Playoffs
Season	Team	League	GP	G	A	Pts	PIM	GP	G	A	Pts	PIM
2014–15	Linköpings HC	J20	14	0	1	1	8	—	—	—	—	—
2015–16	Linköpings HC	J20	30	1	4	5	8	—	—	—	—	—
2016–17	Linköpings HC	J20	32	7	8	15	16	2	0	0	0	0
2016–17	Linköpings HC	SHL	1	0	0	0	0	—	—	—	—	—
2017–18	Karlskrona HK	J20	26	13	11	24	64	6	2	1	3	0
2017–18	Karlskrona HK	SHL	1	0	0	0	0	—	—	—	—	—
