= Mitchell Heard =

Canadian ice hockey player (born 1992)

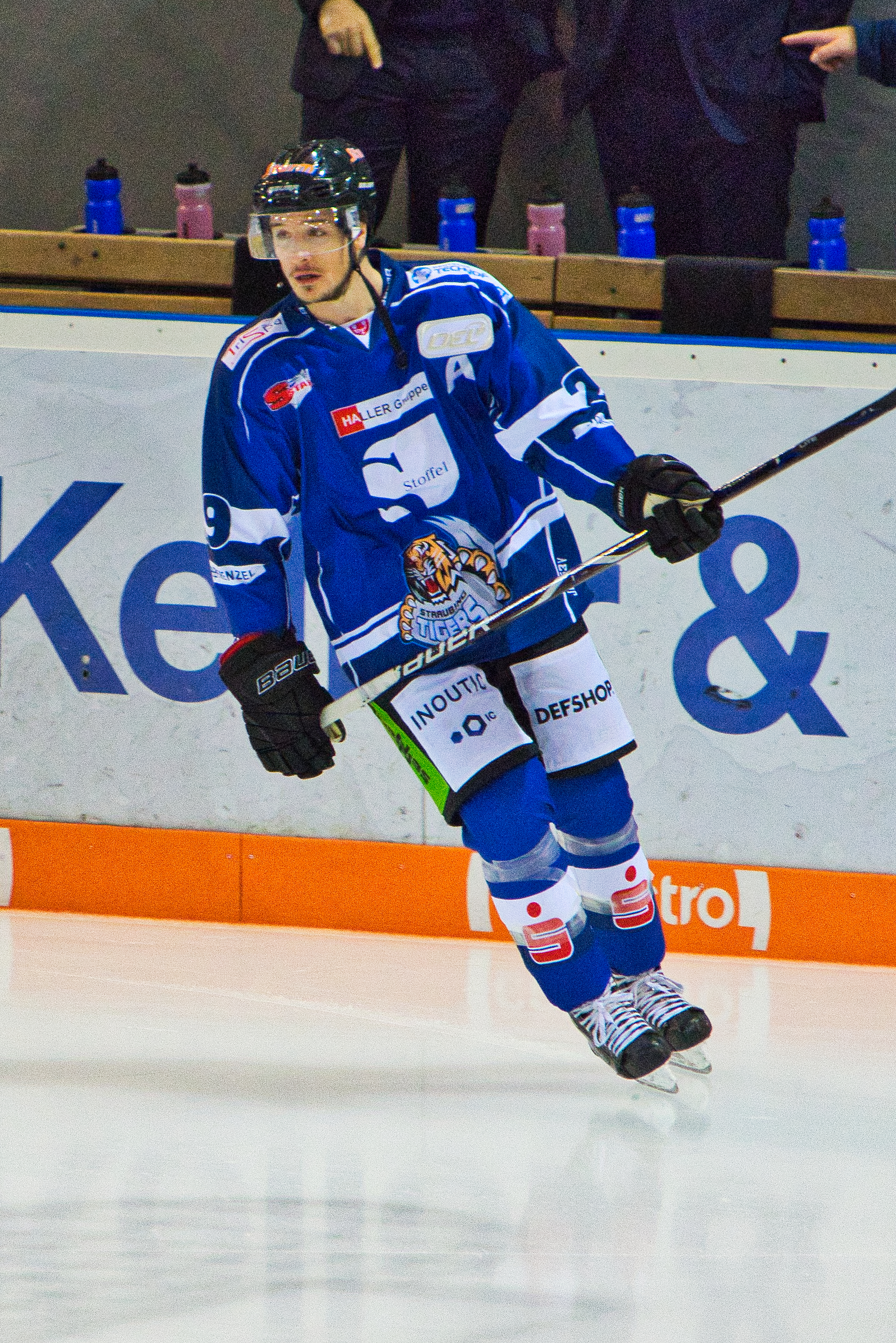
- Heard with the Straubing Tigers in 2018
- Born: March 12, 1992 (age 34) Bowmanville, Ontario, Canada
- Height: 6 ft 1 in (185 cm)
- Weight: 182 lb (83 kg; 13 st 0 lb)
- Position: Center
- Shoots: Left
- ECHL team Former teams: Trenton Ironhawks; Glasgow Clan; Lake Erie Monsters; Stockton Heat; Charlotte Checkers; Straubing Tigers; SC Bietigheim Steelers; Belleville Senators; HK Dukla Michalovce; Sheffield Steelers
- NHL draft: 41st overall, 2012; Colorado Avalanche
- Playing career: 2012–present

Mitchell Heard (born March 12, 1992) is a Canadian professional ice hockey center who plays for the Trenton Ironhawks in the East Coast Hockey League (ECHL). He has previously iced for HK Dukla Michalovce of the Slovak Extraliga and the Glasgow Clan also of the EIHL.

Heard was drafted 41st overall in the 2012 NHL entry draft by the Colorado Avalanche.

== Playing career ==
Heard first played at the Junior A level for the Bowmanville Eagles in the Central Canadian Hockey League registering 30 points in 22 games and leading the Eagles in the post-season with 19 points in 22 games before joining the Plymouth Whalers midway into the 2009–10 season.

In his rookie campaign with the Whalers, Heard immediately established himself within the offensive lines in finishing fourth on the club with 48 points in 66 games. He increased his scoring to a point-per-game rate the following season to be selected with the Colorado Avalanche's first selection in the 2012 NHL entry draft, 41st overall.

With a physically mature frame, Heard was later signed in the off-season on August 14, 2012, to a three-year entry-level contract with the Colorado Avalanche. In the 2012–13 pre-season, Heard participated in his first Avalanche training camp and was assigned to AHL affiliate, the Lake Erie Monsters. Heard made his professional debut with the Monsters and used sparingly as a depth forward before he was later reassigned to his junior club, the Plymouth Whalers, mid-season on January 1, 2013. In his return to the Whalers, Heard was leaned on offensively to finish with 36 points in 32 regular season games but was unable to advance the Whalers to the Conference finals.

In his first full professional season in 2013–14, Heard was in the familiar position of starting the year with the Monsters. Used primarily an checking-line agitator with the ability to fight, Heard finished fourth amongst the AHL in penalty minutes with 167 in 63 games.

Struggling to find his offensive game in the AHL, and in the last year of his entry-level deal with the Avalanche, Heard was reassigned to the Fort Wayne Komets during the 2014–15 season. He responded immediately to contribute with 10 goals and 16 points in just 12 games to earn the ECHL player of the week award in November. He was returned to the Monsters for the remainder of the regular season to post consecutive 100 plus penalty minute seasons. With the Monsters out of playoff contention, Heard was reassigned to the Komets Kelly Cup run. He contributed with 9 points in 10 games before falling to the Toledo Walleye in the Conference semi-finals.

In the offseason, Heard was not tendered a qualifying offer by the Avalanche to be released to free agency. On July 15, 2015, Heard was signed to a one-year AHL contract with the Stockton Heat. After attending the Heat's training camp, Heard was reassigned to begin the 2015–16 season, with ECHL affiliate, the Adirondack Thunder. Over the course of the year, Heard split his time between the Thunder and Heat, appearing in 22 games for 7 points in the AHL.

As a free agent in the off-season, Heard continued his career in the AHL, securing a one-year deal with the Charlotte Checkers on August 11, 2016. Heard would play two seasons within the Checkers organization, also playing on assignment with the Florida Everblades in the ECHL, leading the club in scoring to help reach the Kelly Cup finals against the Colorado Eagles in the 2017–18 season.

Heard opted for a move abroad following his fifth professional season, securing a one-year contract with German club, the Straubing Tigers of the Deutsche Eishockey Liga (DEL), on July 12, 2018.

Heard played and produced offensively with the Straubing Tigers through three seasons, before opting to terminate his contract mid-way through the 2020–21 season, and return to Canada for personal reasons on March 23, 2021.

After a spell in Slovakia with HK Dukla Michalovce, Heard agreed terms to join Glasgow Clan ahead of the 2024–25 season.

== Career statistics ==
			Regular season					Playoffs
Season	Team	League	GP	G	A	Pts	PIM	GP	G	A	Pts	PIM
2009–10	Bowmanville Eagles	CCHL	22	17	13	30	24	22	6	13	19	34
2009–10	Plymouth Whalers	CCHL	16	2	1	3	4	—	—	—	—	—
2010–11	Plymouth Whalers	OHL	66	19	29	48	67	11	1	2	3	10
2011–12	Plymouth Whalers	OHL	57	29	28	57	111	13	4	7	11	26
2012–13	Lake Erie Monsters	AHL	23	1	3	4	72	—	—	—	—	—
2012–13	Plymouth Whalers	OHL	32	17	19	36	34	14	8	5	13	37
2013–14	Lake Erie Monsters	AHL	63	4	8	12	167	—	—	—	—	—
2014–15	Lake Erie Monsters	AHL	51	6	6	12	137	—	—	—	—	—
2014–15	Fort Wayne Komets	ECHL	12	10	6	16	15	10	3	6	9	22
2015–16	Adirondack Thunder	ECHL	33	12	20	32	114	12	5	6	11	39
2015–16	Stockton Heat	AHL	22	3	4	7	71	—	—	—	—	—
2016–17	Charlotte Checkers	AHL	36	0	4	4	53	—	—	—	—	—
2016–17	Florida Everblades	ECHL	11	6	7	13	29	8	1	0	1	49
2017–18	Florida Everblades	ECHL	63	25	42	67	153	20	9	13	22	39
2017–18	Charlotte Checkers	AHL	4	0	0	0	2	—	—	—	—	—
2018–19	Straubing Tigers	DEL	28	5	11	16	67	—	—	—	—	—
2019–20	Straubing Tigers	DEL	49	6	24	30	56	—	—	—	—	—
2020–21	Straubing Tigers	DEL	17	3	3	6	31	—	—	—	—	—
2021–22	SC Bietigheim Steelers	DEL	19	7	4	11	19	—	—	—	—	—
2021–22	Toledo Walleye	ECHL	49	23	26	49	70	21	2	10	12	25
2022–23	Toledo Walleye	ECHL	46	16	27	43	145	—	—	—	—	—
2022–23	Belleville Senators	AHL	13	1	2	3	39	—	—	—	—	—
2023–24	HK Dukla Michalovce	Slovak	43	13	19	32	136	7	0	1	1	35
2024–25	Glasgow Clan	EIHL	49	21	27	48	131	2	2	2	4	0
2025–26	Glasgow Clan	EIHL	1	0	1	1	0	—	—	—	—	—
2025–26	Sheffield Steelers	EIHL	52	14	28	42	130	4	2	0	2	24
AHL totals			212	15	27	42	541	—	—	—	—	—
