= Cal Heeter =

American ice hockey player

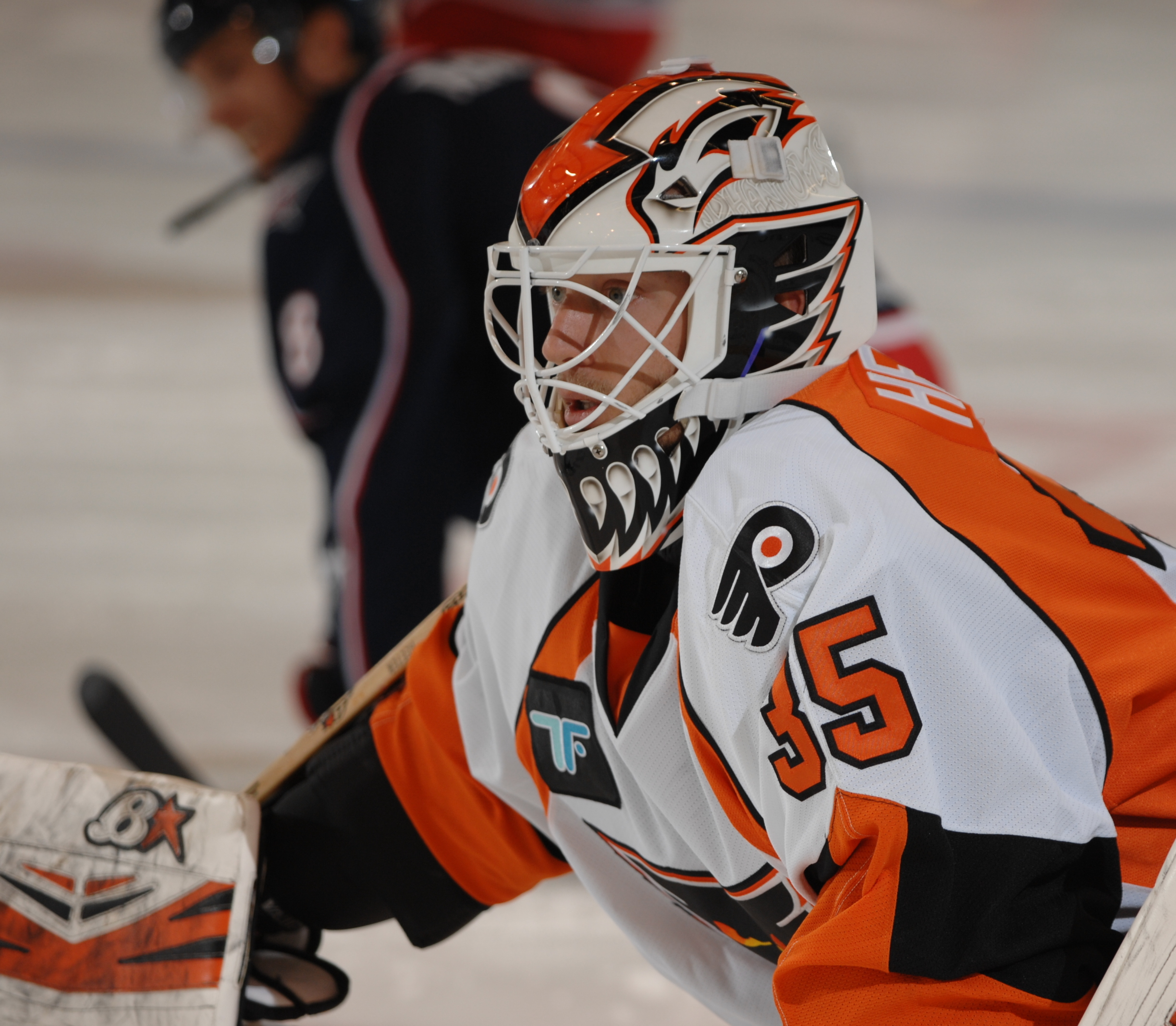
- Heeter with the Adirondack Phantoms in 2013
- Born: November 2, 1988 (age 37) St. Louis, Missouri, U.S.
- Height: 6 ft 4 in (193 cm)
- Weight: 194 lb (88 kg; 13 st 12 lb)
- Position: Goaltender
- Caught: Left
- Played for: Philadelphia Flyers; KHL Medveščak Zagreb; Hamburg Freezers
- National team: United States
- NHL draft: Undrafted
- Playing career: 2012–2018

Calvin Heeter (born November 2, 1988) is an American former professional ice hockey goaltender. He most recently played with the Orlando Solar Bears in the ECHL while under contract with the Toronto Marlies of the American Hockey League (AHL). He played in one game for the Philadelphia Flyers of the National Hockey League (NHL) during the 2013–14 season.

== Playing career ==
Heeter played high school hockey for Christian Brothers College High School in St. Louis, Missouri. He led CBC to Mid-States High School Championships as the backup goaltender in 2004 and as the starting goaltender in 2005. He played high school hockey for three years at CBC, leaving the program during his senior year to play tier II junior hockey for the Wichita Falls Wildcats of the North American Hockey League (NAHL) for the 2006-07 season. He returned to St. Louis following one season with the Wildcats, and he finished his senior year of high school at Ritenour High School. After high school graduation, Heeter spent the 2007–08 season with the St. Louis Bandits, also of the NAHL.

Heeter spent four years playing hockey for the Ohio State Buckeyes of the NCAA. After spending four years with the team, Heeter signed a two-year entry-level contract with the Flyers on March 6, 2012. Heeter played the bulk of his two years with the Flyers organization playing for the Adirondack Phantoms, their affiliate. On April 13, 2014, Heeter made his one and only appearance in net for the NHL team in a 6-5 shootout loss to the Carolina Hurricanes.

Following the 2013-14 season, the Flyers did not make a qualifying offer to Heeter and as a result he became an unrestricted free agent on July 1, 2014. He signed a one-year contract with the Evansville Icemen of the ECHL on October 8, 2014.

After beginning the season with the IceMen, Heeter played with the Toronto Marlies on a professional try-out contract before signing for the remainder of the season abroad with Croatian club, KHL Medveščak Zagreb, of the Russian Kontinental Hockey League on November 10, 2014.

He also started the 2015–16 season with the Zagreb team and moved to Germany in October 2015, inking a deal with the Hamburg Freezers of the Deutsche Eishockey Liga (DEL) for the remainder of the season. He saw the ice in 24 DEL contests for Hamburg, posting an 11–8–0 record, with a 3.00 GAA and a .900 save percentage. The Freezers organization folded after the 2015–16 season.

On July 25, 2016, Heeter signed a one-year contract with the Grand Rapids Griffins, the AHL affiliate of the Detroit Red Wings.

On August 17, 2017, Heeter signed a one-year contract as a free agent in a return with the Toronto Marlies, the AHL affiliate of the Toronto Maple Leafs.

== International play ==
Medal record

Representing United States

Men's ice hockey

World Championships
Bronze medal – third place	2013 Stockholm/Helsinki	

Heeter attended the 2013 IIHF World Championship as a member of Team USA, but he did not play as the team claimed a bronze medal. He was selected to play for Team USA at the 2015 Deutschland Cup.

== Career statistics ==
=== Regular season and playoffs ===
			Regular season									Playoffs
Season	Team	League	GP	W	L	T/OT	MIN	GA	SO	GAA	SV%	GP	W	L	MIN	GA	SO	GAA	SV%
2006–07	Wichita Falls Wildcats	NAHL	31	13	13	3	1,828	96	1	3.15	.896	—	—	—	—	—	—	—	—
2007–08	St. Louis Bandits	NAHL	34	25	6	1	1,972	80	2	2.43	.917	—	—	—	—	—	—	—	—
2008–09	Ohio State	CCHA	5	2	1	0	200	11	0	3.29	.898	—	—	—	—	—	—	—	—
2009–10	Ohio State	CCHA	20	9	6	2	1,108	59	1	3.19	.897	—	—	—	—	—	—	—	—
2010–11	Ohio State	CCHA	37	15	18	4	2,191	84	2	2.30	.923	—	—	—	—	—	—	—	—
2011–12	Ohio State	CCHA	32	13	11	5	1,760	72	2	2.45	.918	—	—	—	—	—	—	—	—
2012–13	Adirondack Phantoms	AHL	32	12	16	3	1,811	88	0	2.92	.908	—	—	—	—	—	—	—	—
2012–13	Trenton Titans	ECHL	8	3	3	0	453	24	0	3.18	.900	—	—	—	—	—	—	—	—
2013–14	Adirondack Phantoms	AHL	44	16	25	2	2,465	109	4	2.65	.912	—	—	—	—	—	—	—	—
2013–14	Philadelphia Flyers	NHL	1	0	0	1	64	5	0	4.69	.868	—	—	—	—	—	—	—	—
2014–15	Evansville Icemen	ECHL	4	3	1	0	241	9	0	2.24	.922	—	—	—	—	—	—	—	—
2014–15	Toronto Marlies	AHL	1	0	0	1	67	4	0	3.60	.923	—	—	—	—	—	—	—	—
2014–15	KHL Medveščak Zagreb	KHL	22	9	9	2	1,223	54	0	2.65	.911	—	—	—	—	—	—	—	—
2015–16	KHL Medveščak Zagreb	KHL	6	0	2	2	279	15	0	3.23	.856	—	—	—	—	—	—	—	—
2015–16	Hamburg Freezers	DEL	24	11	8	0	1,240	62	0	3.00	.900	—	—	—	—	—	—	—	—
2016–17	Toledo Walleye	ECHL	17	14	2	1	1,042	52	1	2.99	.897	—	—	—	—	—	—	—	—
2016–17	Grand Rapids Griffins	AHL	12	10	2	0	724	25	1	2.07	.933	—	—	—	—	—	—	—	—
2017–18	Orlando Solar Bears	ECHL	43	19	15	6	2,368	108	1	2.74	.915	8	4	3	443	14	1	1.90	.945
NHL totals			1	0	0	1	64	5	0	4.69	.868	—	—	—	—	—	—	—	—

== See also ==
- List of players who played only one game in the NHL
