= 2025–26 EIHL season =

- League: Elite Ice Hockey League
- Sport: Ice hockey
- Duration: 13 September 2025 – 19 April 2026
- Matches: 270
- Teams: 10
- Total attendance: 1,321,128
- Average attendance: 3,863

Regular season
- Season champions: Belfast Giants (8th title)

Challenge Cup
- Winners: Nottingham Panthers (9th title)
- Runners-up: Coventry Blaze

Playoffs
- Champions: Cardiff Devils (4th title)
- Runners-up: Sheffield Steelers

EIHL seasons
- 2024–25 2026–27

The 2025–26 EIHL season was the 22nd season of the Elite Ice Hockey League (EIHL), the highest level of domestic ice hockey played in the United Kingdom. The league ran three separate competitions which were played between 13 September 2025 and 19 April 2026. The Belfast Giants were the defending League Championship and Challenge Cup winners, while the Nottingham Panthers were the defending playoff champions.

The Panthers won a record-extending ninth Challenge Cup title, and their first for a decade, defeating the Coventry Blaze 3–2 through Didrik Henbrant's overtime goal. The Giants defended their regular season title – a record-extending eighth overall – defeating the Panthers 4–2 on 27 March, to open up an unassailable margin over their rivals. The Cardiff Devils went on to win the play-offs, defeating the Sheffield Steelers 5–2 in the final, with two goals each from Kohen Olischefski and Nolan Yaremko.

== Teams ==
The same ten teams that competed in the 2024–25 EIHL season will compete in the 2025–26 season.

Team	City/Town	Arena	Capacity
Belfast Giants	(Northern Ireland) Belfast	SSE Arena Belfast	8,700
Cardiff Devils	(Wales) Cardiff	Vindico Arena	3,110
Coventry Blaze	(England) Coventry	Planet Ice Coventry	3,000
Dundee Stars	(Scotland) Dundee	Dundee Ice Arena	2,700
Fife Flyers	(Scotland) Kirkcaldy	Fife Ice Arena	3,525
Glasgow Clan	(Scotland) Glasgow	Braehead Arena	4,000
Guildford Flames	(England) Guildford	Guildford Spectrum	2,200
Manchester Storm	(England) Altrincham	Planet Ice Altrincham	2,440
Nottingham Panthers	(England) Nottingham	Motorpoint Arena Nottingham	7,500
Sheffield Steelers	(England) Sheffield	Utilita Arena Sheffield	9,300

== Regular season ==
=== League standings ===
Each team played 54 games, playing each of the other nine teams six times: three times on home ice, and three times away from home. Points were awarded for each game: two points for all victories, regardless of whether it was in regulation time or after overtime or game-winning shots, one point for losing in overtime or game-winning shots, and zero points for losing in regulation time. At the end of the regular season, the team that finished with the most points were crowned league champions. The top eight teams qualified for the playoffs.

Pos	Team	Pld	W	OTW	OTL	L	GF	GA	GD	Pts	Qualification
1	Belfast Giants (C)	54	35	5	4	10	207	122	+85	84	Regular season champions Qualification to playoffs
2	Cardiff Devils	54	30	5	5	14	195	122	+73	75	Qualification to playoffs
3	Nottingham Panthers	54	26	7	6	15	186	145	+41	72 (Note: Head-to-head points: Nottingham 8, Sheffield 7.)	Qualification to playoffs
4	Sheffield Steelers	54	26	7	6	15	196	138	+58	72	Qualification to playoffs
5	Guildford Flames	54	24	5	6	19	168	151	+17	64	Qualification to playoffs
6	Manchester Storm	54	16	10	9	19	158	154	+4	61	Qualification to playoffs
7	Coventry Blaze	54	19	6	7	22	167	176	−9	57	Qualification to playoffs
8	Glasgow Clan	54	19	5	9	21	147	164	−17	57	Qualification to playoffs
9	Dundee Stars	54	7	6	5	36	121	247	−126	31	
10	Fife Flyers	54	7	5	4	38	118	244	−126	28	

Source: Elite League
Rules for classification: 1) Points; 2) Games won in regulation time; 3) Number of games won; 4) Head-to-head results, ranked by criteria 1 to 3; 5) Fewest regulation losses; 6) Away game results, ranked by criteria 1 to 3; 7) Goals scored; 8) Goal difference; 9) Fewest penalty minutes; 10) Drawing of lots.
(C) Champion

== Playoffs ==
=== Bracket ===
In the two-legged quarter-finals, the highest-ranked team met the lowest-ranked team, the second-highest-ranked team met the second-lowest-ranked team and so forth. The winners of each tie was determined by aggregate scoring over the two games. In the semi-finals, the highest remaining seed were matched against the lowest remaining seed, with the other two teams facing off. The winners of the semi-finals progressed to the Final, with the losers playing in the third-place match.

Quarter-finals (11–12 April)
1	Belfast Giants	1	1	2
8	Glasgow Clan	0	3	3
2	Cardiff Devils	2	4	6
7	Coventry Blaze	1	1	2
(Pairings are reseeded after the first round)
3	Nottingham Panthers	1	4	5
6	Manchester Storm	2	4	6
4	Sheffield Steelers	1	5	6
5	Guildford Flames	1	1	2

Semi-finals (18 April)
2	Cardiff Devils	3
8	Glasgow Clan	1
4	Sheffield Steelers	6
6	Manchester Storm	0

Final (19 April)
2	Cardiff Devils	5
4	Sheffield Steelers	2
Third place
6	Manchester Storm	2
8	Glasgow Clan	3

=== Quarter-finals ===
The quarter-final schedule was announced on 5 April 2026, following the conclusion of the final-day regular season matches.

==== (1) Belfast Giants vs. (8) Glasgow Clan ====
11 April 2026	Belfast Giants	1–0	Glasgow Clan	SSE Arena Belfast; Attendance:7,298	Recap
No scoring		First period	No scoring
No scoring		Second period	No scoring
Nicolas Guay – 18:02		Third period	No scoring
Jake Kupsky (22 shots / 22 saves)		Goalie stats	Sami Aittokallio (30 shots / 29 saves)

12 April 2026	Glasgow Clan	3–1	SO	Belfast Giants	Braehead Arena; Attendance:3,448	Recap
No scoring		First period		No scoring
Brady Risk – 1:22; Tristin Langan (PPG) – 8:02		Second period		11:21 – Mike Lee
No scoring		Third period		No scoring
Mick Messner; Brett Neumann; Cade Neilson (miss); Tristin Langan (miss); Brady Risk (miss)		Shootout		(miss) Ben Lake; J. J. Piccinich; (miss) Jordan Kawaguchi; (miss) Scott Conway; (miss) Brandon Whistle
Sami Aittokallio (37 shots / 36 saves)		Goalie stats		Jake Kupsky (35 shots / 33 saves)

Glasgow Clan win 3–2 on aggregate.

==== (2) Cardiff Devils vs. (7) Coventry Blaze ====
11 April 2026	Coventry Blaze	1–2	Cardiff Devils	Coventry Skydome; Attendance:2,304	Recap
Grayson Constable – 14:40		First period	No scoring
No scoring		Second period	4:45 – Evan Mosey; 11:51 – Kristoff Kontos
No scoring		Third period	No scoring
Mat Robson (42 shots / 40 saves)		Goalie stats	Christian Stoever (22 shots / 21 saves)

12 April 2026	Cardiff Devils	4–1	Coventry Blaze	Vindico Arena; Attendance:3,110	Recap
Kohen Olischefski – 0:39		First period	No scoring
Josh MacDonald (PPG) – 5:23; Joey Martin (PPG) – 9:18; Riley Brandt – 9:39		Second period	No scoring
No scoring		Third period	10:25 – William Boysen
Christian Stoever (31 shots / 30 saves)		Goalie stats	Mat Robson (42 shots / 38 saves)

Cardiff Devils win 6–2 on aggregate.

==== (3) Nottingham Panthers vs. (6) Manchester Storm ====
11 April 2026	Manchester Storm	2–1	Nottingham Panthers	Planet Ice Altrincham; Attendance:2,350	Recap
Kyle Locke – 10:14; Tyler Hinam – 13:43		First period	No scoring
No scoring		Second period	No scoring
No scoring		Third period	17:23 – Matt Marcinew
Drew DeRidder (38 shots / 37 saves)		Goalie stats	Kevin Carr (35 shots / 33 saves)

12 April 2026	Nottingham Panthers	4–4	SO	Manchester Storm	Motorpoint Arena Nottingham; Attendance:6,790	Recap
Mitch Fossier – 15:46		First period		5:37 – Brandon Cutler
David Noël – 18:37		Second period		13:45 – Loren Ulett
Matt Marcinew – 13:00; Didrik Henbrant (EA) – 19:35		Third period		2:58 – Gary Haden (PPG)
Cooper Zech (miss); Mitch Fossier (miss); Matt Marcinew (miss); Tim Doherty (miss); Chase Pearson (miss)		Shootout		(miss) Dante Hannoun; (miss) Brandon Cutler; (miss) Nick Welsh; (miss) J. D. Dudek; Brady Gilmour
Kevin Carr (29 shots / 26 saves)		Goalie stats		Drew DeRidder (42 shots / 38 saves)

Manchester Storm win 6–5 on aggregate.

==== (4) Sheffield Steelers vs. (5) Guildford Flames ====
11 April 2026	Guildford Flames	1–1	Sheffield Steelers	Guildford Spectrum; Attendance:1,973	Recap
Jamal Watson – 8:29		First period	11:20 – Evan Jasper
No scoring		Second period	No scoring
No scoring		Third period	No scoring
Justin Fazio (41 shots / 40 saves)		Goalie stats	Matt Greenfield (31 shots / 30 saves)

12 April 2026	Sheffield Steelers	5–1	Guildford Flames	Utilita Arena Sheffield; Attendance:8,673	Recap
Dominic Cormier – 1:44; Sam Tremblay – 13:19		First period	No scoring
Jordon Southorn – 10:53; Sam Tremblay (2) – 16:11		Second period	No scoring
Robert Dowd – 2:45		Third period	15:44 – Cole Ully (PPG)
Matt Greenfield (21 shots / 20 saves)		Goalie stats	Justin Fazio (40 shots / 35 saves)

Sheffield Steelers win 6–2 on aggregate.

=== Semi-finals ===
The semi-final schedule was announced on 12 April 2026, following the conclusion of the quarter-final matches.

18 April 2026; 15:00	Cardiff Devils	3–1 (0–0, 2–1, 1–0)	Glasgow Clan	Motorpoint Arena Nottingham; Attendance: 6,608

Game reference

Christian Stoever
Goalies
Sami Aittokallio
Referees:
Tom Pering
Joe Sewell
Linesmen:
Lee Young
Rob Pullar

Connor Caponi – 24:29	1–0
	1–1	25:20 – Jason Fram
Brandon Estes – 25:58	2–1
Joey Martin (ENG) – 59:34	3–1

0 min
Penalties
0 min
34
Shots
24

18 April 2026; 19:00	Sheffield Steelers	6–0 (1–0, 1–0, 4–0)	Manchester Storm	Motorpoint Arena Nottingham; Attendance: 6,608

Game reference

Matt Greenfield
Goalies
Drew DeRidder
Referees:
Daniel Ferguson
Andy Dalton
Linesmen:
Danny Beresford
Scott Rodger

Ryan Tait (PPG) – 12:42	1–0
Mitchell Heard – 31:08	2–0
Evan Jasper – 48:19	3–0
Ryan Tait (2; PPG) – 54:42	4–0
Mitchell Heard (2; PPG) – 58:24	5–0
Stephen Harper (PPG) – 59:04	6–0

9 min
Penalties
24 min
49
Shots
23

=== Third-place match ===
19 April 2026; 13:00	Manchester Storm	2–3 (1–1, 1–2, 0–0)	Glasgow Clan	Motorpoint Arena Nottingham; Attendance: 6,402

Game reference

- Evan Weninger (40:00)
- Tyler De La Bertouche (19:01)
Goalies
Liam Soulière
Referees:
Daniel Ferguson
Andrew Miller
Linesmen:
Lee Young
Rob Pullar

Connor Lee – 4:15	1–0
	1–1	15:10 – Mick Messner
Harrison Caines – 35:06	2–1
	2–2	36:37 – Hugo Roy
	2–3	38:07 – Brady Risk

0 min
Penalties
2 min
27
Shots
33

=== Final ===
19 April 2026; 17:00	Cardiff Devils	5–2 (1–0, 2–1, 2–1)	Sheffield Steelers	Motorpoint Arena Nottingham; Attendance: 6,402

Game reference

Christian Stoever
Goalies
Matt Greenfield
Referees:
Joe Sewell
Andy Dalton
Linesmen:
Danny Beresford
Scott Rodger

Kohen Olischefski (PPG) – 2:41	1–0
	1–1	22:52 – Kevin Tansey
Nolan Yaremko – 38:32	2–1
Nolan Yaremko (2) – 39:57	3–1
	3–2	53:25 – Ryan Tait
Josh MacDonald (ENG) – 58:23	4–2
Kohen Olischefski (2; ENG) – 59:31	5–2

0 min
Penalties
6 min
31
Shots
23

== Challenge Cup ==
The Challenge Cup was split into two stages: an initial group stage where the league's ten teams were divided into two groups based on geographical distance – one group of six teams (Group A) and a group of four teams (Group B). The teams in Group A (the five English teams and the Cardiff Devils) played each of the other teams twice for a total of ten games, while the teams in Group B (the three Scottish teams and the Belfast Giants) played each of the other teams four times for a total of twelve games.

The top two teams in Group A and the winners of Group B qualified for the semi-finals. The runners-up in Group B faced the third-placed team in Group A in a semi-final playoff game held at the arena of the team with a higher group stage points percentage to determine the final semi-finalist.

=== Group stage ===
==== Group A ====
Pos	Team	Pld	W	OTW	OTL	L	GF	GA	GD	Pts	Qualification
1	Sheffield Steelers	10	5	2	1	2	32	21	+11	15	Qualification to semi-finals
2	Coventry Blaze	10	4	2	1	3	29	31	−2	13	Qualification to semi-finals
3	Nottingham Panthers	10	5	1	0	4	33	31	+2	12 (Note: Away points: Nottingham 8, Cardiff 6.)	Qualification to play-in match
4	Cardiff Devils	10	5	1	0	4	29	24	+5	12	
5	Manchester Storm	10	2	1	2	5	28	34	−6	8	
6	Guildford Flames	10	2	0	3	5	28	38	−10	7	

Source: Elite League
Rules for classification: 1) Points; 2) Games won in regulation time; 3) Number of games won; 4) Head-to-head results, ranked by criteria 1 to 3; 5) Fewest regulation losses; 6) Away game results, ranked by criteria 1 to 3; 7) Goals scored; 8) Goal difference; 9) Fewest penalty minutes; 10) Drawing of lots.

==== Group B ====
Pos	Team	Pld	W	OTW	OTL	L	GF	GA	GD	Pts	Qualification
1	Belfast Giants	12	7	0	3	2	48	31	+17	17	Qualification to semi-finals
2	Glasgow Clan	12	6	2	0	4	38	30	+8	16	Qualification to play-in match
3	Dundee Stars	12	3	3	1	5	43	46	−3	13	
4	Fife Flyers	12	2	1	2	7	24	46	−22	8	

Source: Elite League
Rules for classification: 1) Points; 2) Games won in regulation time; 3) Number of games won; 4) Head-to-head results, ranked by criteria 1 to 3; 5) Fewest regulation losses; 6) Away game results, ranked by criteria 1 to 3; 7) Goals scored; 8) Goal difference; 9) Fewest penalty minutes; 10) Drawing of lots.

=== Knockout stage ===
==== Bracket ====
Play-in match; (December 2025)
B2	Glasgow Clan	1
A3	Nottingham Panthers	4

Semi-finals; (February & March 2026)
1	Sheffield Steelers	0	4	4
4	Nottingham Panthers	3	2	5
2	Belfast Giants	2	3	5
3	Coventry Blaze	3	6	9

Final; (March 2026)
4	Nottingham Panthers	3
3	Coventry Blaze	2

==== Play-in match ====
17 December 2025; 19:30	Glasgow Clan	1–4 (0–0, 1–2, 0–2)	Nottingham Panthers	Braehead Arena; Attendance: 2,323

Game reference

Sami Aittokallio
Goalies
Kevin Carr
Referees:
Andy Dalton
Daniel Ferguson
Linesmen:
Scott Rodger
James Nelson

	0–1	22:11 – David Noël
Tristin Langan – 34:30	1–1
	1–2	39:47 – Matt Marcinew
	1–3	52:36 – Matt Spencer
	1–4	57:37 – Tim Doherty (ENG)

2 min
Penalties
8 min
28
Shots
24

==== Semi-finals ====
In a change for the 2025–26 season, the semi-final matchups were determined on win percentage from the group stage – between both group winners (the Sheffield Steelers and the Belfast Giants) for the number one and two seeds, and the remaining two teams (the Coventry Blaze and the Nottingham Panthers) for the number three and four seeds.

===== (1) Sheffield Steelers vs. (4) Nottingham Panthers =====
18 February 2026	Nottingham Panthers	3–0	Sheffield Steelers	Motorpoint Arena Nottingham; Attendance:6,816	Recap
Brendan Harris – 5:22; Jakob Stridsberg – 6:54; Brendan Harris (2) – 18:09		First period	No scoring
No scoring		Second period	No scoring
No scoring		Third period	No scoring
Kevin Carr (26 shots / 26 saves)		Goalie stats	Matt Greenfield (17 shots / 14 saves)

25 February 2026	Sheffield Steelers	4–2	OT	Nottingham Panthers	Utilita Arena Sheffield; Attendance:9,086	Recap
Mikko Juusola (SHG) – 6:46		First period		7:06 – Matt Marcinew (PPG)
Robert Dowd (PPG) – 12:57; Robert Dowd (2) – 14:58		Second period		No scoring
Mitchell Balmas (PPG) – 1:56		Third period		No scoring
No scoring		First overtime period		0:25 – Bryan Lemos
Matt Greenfield (26 shots / 24 saves)		Goalie stats		Kevin Carr (40 shots / 36 saves)

Nottingham Panthers win 5–4 on aggregate.

===== (2) Belfast Giants vs. (3) Coventry Blaze =====
The second leg, initially scheduled for 18 February, was postponed as a result of the Blaze being unable to travel to Belfast. The game was rescheduled to 4 March.

11 February 2026	Coventry Blaze	3–2	Belfast Giants	Coventry Skydome; Attendance:2,078	Recap
Jack Hopkins – 1:54; Kim Tallberg – 13:28		First period	8:41 – Ben Lake
Grayson Constable – 16:57		Second period	9:46 – Scott Conway
No scoring		Third period	No scoring
Mat Robson (44 shots / 42 saves)		Goalie stats	Alexis Gravel (18 shots / 15 saves)

4 March 2026	Belfast Giants	3–6	Coventry Blaze	SSE Arena Belfast; Attendance:6,777	Recap
Carsen Twarynski – 10:42		First period	17:36 – Matthew Gleason
No scoring		Second period	10:34 – Matthew Gleason (2); 16:12 – Jere Vertanen
Ryan Smith – 13:22; Carsen Twarynski (2; EA) – 15:16		Third period	3:47 – Alessio Luciani; 16:04 – Jack Hopkins (ENG); 19:51 – Colton Saucerman (ENG)
Jake Kupsky (24 shots / 20 saves)		Goalie stats	Mat Robson (48 shots / 45 saves)

Coventry Blaze win 9–5 on aggregate.

==== Final ====
As the highest remaining seed, the Coventry Blaze were scheduled to have home advantage for the final against the Nottingham Panthers. However, as the Coventry Skydome did not meet league requirements for the final, it was instead played at Motorpoint Arena Nottingham.

18 March 2026; 19:30	Coventry Blaze	2–3 (OT) (0–0, 1–1, 1–1, 0–1)	Nottingham Panthers	Motorpoint Arena Nottingham; Attendance: 6,287

Game reference

Mat Robson
Goalies
Kevin Carr
Referees:
Tom Pering
Joe Sewell
Linesmen:
Danny Beresford
Rob Pullar

Michael Pelech – 22:56	1–0
	1–1	34:31 – Mitch Fossier
	1–2	46:35 – Jakob Stridsberg
Elijiah Barriga (PPG) – 51:56	2–2
	2–3	71:29 – Didrik Henbrant

4 min
Penalties
4 min
31
Shots
42
