= 2024–25 EIHL season =

- League: Elite Ice Hockey League
- Sport: Ice hockey
- Duration: 7 September 2024 – 20 April 2025
- Matches: 330
- Teams: 10
- Total attendance: 1,247,972
- Average attendance: 3,660

Regular season
- Season champions: Belfast Giants (7th title)

Challenge Cup
- Winners: Belfast Giants (6th title)
- Runners-up: Cardiff Devils

Playoffs
- Champions: Nottingham Panthers (7th title)
- Runners-up: Cardiff Devils

EIHL seasons
- 2023–24 2025–26

The 2024–25 EIHL season was the 21st season of the Elite Ice Hockey League, the highest level of domestic ice hockey played in the United Kingdom, with three separate competitions played for between September 2024 and April 2025.

Ten teams competed in the league, over a 54-game regular season, with the best eight teams qualifying for the second competition, the playoffs. The playoffs were then held over three knockout rounds with aggregated quarter-finals, and one-off matches for the semi-finals and final – with the last two rounds played over the finals weekend at the Nottingham Arena. Teams also competed in the Challenge Cup, involving group play and one-off knockout rounds to crown its winner. The defending champion in all three competitions are the Sheffield Steelers, having completed a Grand Slam in 2023–24.

The first silverware of the season went to the Belfast Giants, who won the Challenge Cup for the sixth time overall, and a fifth time in seven seasons, with a 4–0 victory over the Cardiff Devils. The Giants then added a record seventh regular season title, prevailing over the Steelers by three points, after both teams had entered the final day of the season with an opportunity to finish top of the table. The Devils stopped a Grand Slam with a 5–0 win over the Giants in the playoff semi-final, progressing to the final against the Nottingham Panthers. In a final where both teams had a game-winning overtime goal overturned via coach's challenge, the Panthers won 4–3 in double overtime for their first playoff title since 2016.

== Teams ==
The same ten teams that competed in 2023–24 remained for the 2024–25 season.

Team	City/Town	Arena	Capacity
Belfast Giants	(Northern Ireland) Belfast	SSE Arena Belfast	8,700
Cardiff Devils	(Wales) Cardiff	Vindico Arena	3,110
Coventry Blaze	(England) Coventry	Coventry Skydome	3,000
Dundee Stars	(Scotland) Dundee	Dundee Ice Arena	2,400
Fife Flyers	(Scotland) Kirkcaldy	Fife Ice Arena	3,525
Glasgow Clan	(Scotland) Glasgow	Braehead Arena	4,000
Guildford Flames	(England) Guildford	Guildford Spectrum	2,001
Manchester Storm	(England) Altrincham	Altrincham Ice Dome	2,351
Nottingham Panthers	(England) Nottingham	Motorpoint Arena Nottingham	7,500
Sheffield Steelers	(England) Sheffield	Utilita Arena Sheffield	9,368

== Regular season ==
=== League standings ===
Each team played 54 games, playing each of the other nine teams six times: three times on home ice, and three times away from home. Points were awarded for each game, two points were awarded for all victories, regardless of whether it was in regulation time or after overtime or game-winning shots. One point was awarded for losing in overtime or game-winning shots, and zero points for losing in regulation time. At the end of the regular season, the team that finished with the most points was crowned the league champion, and qualified for the 2025–26 Champions Hockey League. The top eight teams qualified for the playoffs.

Pos	Team	Pld	W	OTW	OTL	L	GF	GA	GD	Pts	Qualification
1	Belfast Giants (C)	54	31	6	6	11	208	132	+76	80	Regular season champions; Qualification to playoffs, and Champions Hockey League
2	Sheffield Steelers	54	33	4	3	14	217	137	+80	77	Qualification to playoffs
3	Nottingham Panthers	54	30	4	6	14	182	120	+62	74	Qualification to playoffs
4	Cardiff Devils	54	29	3	4	18	178	143	+35	68	Qualification to playoffs
5	Coventry Blaze	54	23	7	4	20	183	167	+16	64	Qualification to playoffs
6	Guildford Flames	54	22	3	7	22	179	174	+5	57	Qualification to playoffs
7	Glasgow Clan	54	19	7	3	25	166	188	−22	55	Qualification to playoffs
8	Dundee Stars	54	18	4	5	27	169	204	−35	49	Qualification to playoffs
9	Manchester Storm	54	19	3	3	29	168	197	−29	47	
10	Fife Flyers	54	3	2	2	47	117	305	−188	12	

Source: Elite League
Rules for classification: 1) Points; 2) Games won in regulation time; 3) Number of games won; 4) Head-to-head results, ranked by criteria 1 to 3; 5) Fewest regulation losses; 6) Away game results, ranked by criteria 1 to 3; 7) Goals scored; 8) Goal difference; 9) Fewest penalty minutes; 10) Drawing of lots.
(C) Champion

=== Statistics ===
==== Scoring leaders ====
The following players led the league in points, at the conclusion of the regular season. If two or more skaters are tied (i.e. same number of points, goals and played games), all of the tied skaters are shown.

Player	Team	GP	G	A	Pts	+/–	PIM
Alexis D'Aoust	Manchester Storm	54	32	36	68	+1	30
Chase Gresock	Coventry Blaze	54	32	30	62	+7	38
Nick Seitz	Coventry Blaze	54	30	29	59	+9	55
Alessio Luciani	Coventry Blaze	54	27	32	59	+13	23
Josh MacDonald	Cardiff Devils	51	28	29	57	+11	14
Scott Conway	Belfast Giants	54	28	29	57	+36	40
Mitchell Balmas	Sheffield Steelers	54	23	34	57	+15	10
Mikko Juusola	Sheffield Steelers	54	27	28	55	+28	12
Patrick Watling	Sheffield Steelers	53	17	38	55	+24	20
Brendan Harms	Dundee Stars	54	25	29	54	+2	50

==== Leading goaltenders ====
The following goaltenders led the league in goals against average, provided that they have played at least 40% of their team's minutes, at the conclusion of the regular season.

Player	Team(s)	GP	TOI	W	L	GA	SO	SV%	GAA
Jason Grande	Nottingham Panthers	30	1679:41	19	10	48	3	94.87%	1.71
Jackson Whistle	Belfast Giants	27	1582:01	20	6	57	2	92.28%	2.16
Matt Greenfield	Sheffield Steelers	49	2875:09	36	13	107	3	92.76%	2.23
Ryan Bednard	Nottingham Panthers	23	1342:47	15	7	50	2	92.32%	2.23
Tom McCollum	Belfast Giants	28	1684:10	17	11	64	2	91.10%	2.28

== Playoffs ==
=== Bracket ===
In the two-legged quarter-finals, the highest-ranked team met the lowest-ranked team, the second-highest-ranked team met the second-lowest-ranked team and so forth. The winners of each tie was determined by aggregate scoring over the two games. In the semi-finals, the highest remaining seed was matched against the lowest remaining seed, with the other two teams facing off. The winners of the semi-finals progressed to the Final, with the losers playing in the third-place match.

Quarter-finals (11–13 April)
1	Belfast Giants	5	3	8
8	Dundee Stars	2	1	3
2	Sheffield Steelers	1	4	5
7	Glasgow Clan	3	1	4
(Pairings are reseeded after the first round)
3	Nottingham Panthers	2	6	8
6	Guildford Flames	3	3	6
4	Cardiff Devils	2	6	8
5	Coventry Blaze	0	3	3

Semi-finals (19 April)
1	Belfast Giants	0
4	Cardiff Devils	5
2	Sheffield Steelers	3
3	Nottingham Panthers	4

Final (20 April)
4	Cardiff Devils	3
3	Nottingham Panthers	4
Third place
1	Belfast Giants	8
2	Sheffield Steelers	7

=== Quarter-finals ===
==== (1) Belfast Giants vs. (8) Dundee Stars ====
12 April 2025	Belfast Giants	5–2	Dundee Stars	SSE Arena Belfast; Attendance: 6,812	Recap
Jordan Kawaguchi – 5:11		First period	14:54 – Kyle Pouncy
Mike Lee – 8:42; Ben Lake – 10:50		Second period	No scoring
Mike Lee (2; PPG) – 5:27; Grant Mismash – 16:46		Third period	18:15 – Cole MacDonald
Jackson Whistle (29 shots / 27 saves)		Goalie stats	Jarrett Fiske (36 shots / 31 saves)

13 April 2025	Dundee Stars	1–3	Belfast Giants	Dundee Ice Arena; Attendance: 1,957	Recap
No scoring		First period	5:36 – Mark Cooper; 6:59 – J.J. Piccinich; 11:59 – Bobo Carpenter (PPG)
No scoring		Second period	No scoring
Spencer Naas – 13:51		Third period	No scoring
Jarrett Fiske (31 shots / 28 saves)		Goalie stats	Jackson Whistle (28 shots / 27 saves)

Belfast Giants win 8–3 on aggregate.

==== (2) Sheffield Steelers vs. (7) Glasgow Clan ====
11 April 2025	Glasgow Clan	3–1	Sheffield Steelers	Braehead Arena; Attendance: 2,764	Recap
Mitchell Heard – 5:37		First period	No scoring
No scoring		Second period	No scoring
Mitchell Heard (2) – 2:02; Matt Berry – 19:02		Third period	13:39 – Daniel Ciampini
Landon Bow (30 shots / 29 saves)		Goalie stats	Matt Greenfield (44 shots / 41 saves)

13 April 2025	Sheffield Steelers	4–1	OT	Glasgow Clan	Sheffield Arena; Attendance:8,468	Recap
Mitchell Balmas – 7:38; Brandon Whistle – 8:29		First period		No scoring
Kevin Tansey (PPG) – 1:45		Second period		17:14 – Steven Seigo
No scoring		Third period		No scoring
Patrick Watling – 2:23		First overtime period		No scoring
Matt Greenfield (26 shots / 25 saves)		Goalie stats		Landon Bow (40 shots / 36 saves)

Sheffield Steelers win 5–4 on aggregate.

==== (3) Nottingham Panthers vs. (6) Guildford Flames ====
12 April 2025	Guildford Flames	3–2	Nottingham Panthers	Guildford Spectrum; Attendance: 1,954	Recap
Jack Jacome – 3:31		First period	16:21 – Tim Doherty
Daniel Tedesco – 15:42		Second period	14:02 – Tim Doherty (2; PPG)
Ethan Strang – 11:08		Third period	No scoring
Eamon McAdam (45 shots / 43 saves)		Goalie stats	Jason Grande (33 shots / 30 saves)

13 April 2025	Nottingham Panthers	6–3	Guildford Flames	Nottingham Arena; Attendance:6,666	Recap
Davis Bunz – 1:43; Mitch Fossier (PPG) – 3:36		First period	No scoring
Hugo Roy – 16:07; Mitch Fossier (2) – 16:51		Second period	7:35 – Ethan Strang (PPG); 11:01 – Brett Welychka (PPG)
Mitch Fossier (3; PS) – 6:48; Matt Spencer (ENG) – 19:45		Third period	8:56 – Brett Ferguson (PPG)
Jason Grande (39 shots / 36 saves)		Goalie stats	Eamon McAdam (30 shots / 25 saves)

Nottingham Panthers win 8–6 on aggregate.

==== (4) Cardiff Devils vs. (5) Coventry Blaze ====
12 April 2025	Coventry Blaze	0–2	Cardiff Devils	Coventry Skydome; Attendance: 2,219	Recap
No scoring		First period	No scoring
No scoring		Second period	3:20 – Sam Duggan; 11:55 – Tyler Busch
No scoring		Third period	No scoring
Mat Robson (34 shots / 32 saves)		Goalie stats	Ben Bowns (34 shots / 34 saves)

13 April 2025	Cardiff Devils	6–3	Coventry Blaze	Ice Arena Wales; Attendance: 3,110	Recap
Brad Schoonbaert – 14:49		First period	1:42 – Jackson Cressey; 14:25 – Morten Jurgens
Ryan Barrow – 12:26		Second period	1:22 – Alessio Luciani
Cole Sanford – 4:31; Sam Duggan – 7:15; Zach O'Brien – 7:45; Joey Martin – 17:21		Third period	No scoring
Ben Bowns (33 shots / 30 saves)		Goalie stats	Mat Robson (34 shots / 28 saves)

Cardiff Devils win 8–3 on aggregate.

=== Semi-finals ===
Following the conclusion of the quarter-final matchups, the schedule for the Finals weekend was confirmed.

19 April 2025; 15:00	Belfast Giants	0–5 (0–1, 0–4, 0–0)	Cardiff Devils	Nottingham Arena

Game reference

Jackson Whistle
Goalies
Ben Bowns
Referees:
Tom Pering
Oliver Truswell
Linesmen:
Lee Young
Ilia Kisil

0–1	1:08 – Joey Martin
0–2	24:33 – Josh MacDonald
0–3	32:28 – Cole Sanford (PPG)
0–4	32:47 – Cole Sanford (2)
0–5	39:27 – Zach O'Brien

4 min
Penalties
10 min
32
Shots
24

19 April 2025; 19:00	Sheffield Steelers	3–4 (OT) (1–0, 1–1, 1–2, 0–1)	Nottingham Panthers	Nottingham Arena

Game reference

Matt Greenfield
Goalies
Jason Grande
Referees:
Joe Sewell
Andy Dalton
Linesmen:
Danny Beresford
Nathan Carmichael

Samuel Tremblay – 18:43	1–0
Mitchell Balmas – 34:14	2–0
	2–1	37:40 – Cooper Zech (PPG)
	2–2	42:00 – Reid Stefanson
	2–3	57:41 – Mitch Fossier
Mitchell Balmas (2; ENG) – 58:39	3–3
	3–4	60:34 – Sam Herr

6 min
Penalties
4 min
41
Shots
24

=== Third-place match ===
20 April 2025; 13:00	Belfast Giants	8–7 (3–4, 2–1, 3–2)	Sheffield Steelers	Nottingham Arena

Game reference

Andrew Dickson
Goalies
Curtis Warburton
Referees:
Tom Pering
James Ions
Linesmen:
Lee Young
Ilia Kisil

Bobo Carpenter – 0:09	1–0
Bobo Carpenter (2) – 0:26	2–0
	2–1	5:35 – Patrick Watling
Jordan Kawaguchi – 8:58	3–1
	3–2	10:45 – Brandon Whistle
	3–3	14:05 – Samuel Tremblay
	3–4	15:10 – Mitchell Balmas
Karl Boudrais – 26:06	4–4
	4–5	28:22 – Mitchell Balmas (2)
Mark Cooper – 38:00	5–5
Mark Cooper (2) – 44:10	6–5
	6–6	50:00 – Daniel Leavens
Kyle Osterberg – 51:19	7–6
Karl Boudrais (2) – 52:59	8–6
	8–7	54:00 – Kevin Tansey

0 min
Penalties
0 min
45
Shots
29

=== Final ===
20 April 2025; 17:00	Nottingham Panthers	4–3 (2OT) (1–0, 2–1, 0–2, 0–0, 1–0)	Cardiff Devils	Nottingham Arena

Game reference

Jason Grande
Goalies
Ben Bowns
Referees:
Joe Sewell
Andy Dalton
Linesmen:
Danny Beresford
Nathan Carmichael

Sam Herr – 1:21	1–0
Sam Herr (2) – 25:31	2–0
Mitch Fossier (PPG) – 27:50	3–0
	3–1	38:53 – Kohen Olischefski
	3–2	49:11 – Joey Martin
	3–3	56:13 – Gleason Fournier
Mitch Fossier (2) – 92:15	4–3

8 min
Penalties
57 min
45
Shots
42

=== Statistics ===
==== Scoring leaders ====
The following players led the league in points, at the conclusion of the playoffs. If two or more skaters are tied (i.e. same number of points, goals and played games), all of the tied skaters are shown.

Player	Team	GP	G	A	Pts	+/–	PIM
Mitch Fossier	Nottingham Panthers	4	6	4	10	+4	0
Mitchell Balmas	Sheffield Steelers	4	5	2	7	+1	0
Cooper Zech	Nottingham Panthers	4	0	7	7	+1	4
Tim Doherty	Nottingham Panthers	4	2	4	6	+4	2
Bobo Carpenter	Belfast Giants	4	3	2	5	+1	0
Mark Cooper	Belfast Giants	4	3	2	5	+4	4
Joey Martin	Cardiff Devils	4	3	2	5	+3	2
Cole Sanford	Cardiff Devils	4	3	2	5	+3	2
Sam Herr	Nottingham Panthers	4	3	1	4	–2	2
Mitchell Heard	Glasgow Clan	2	2	2	4	+3	0

==== Leading goaltenders ====
The following goaltenders led the league in goals against average, provided that they have played at least 40% of their team's minutes, at the conclusion of the playoffs.

Player	Team(s)	GP	TOI	W	L	GA	SO	SV%	GAA
Ben Bowns	Cardiff Devils	4	272:15	3	1	7	2	95.14%	1.54
Landon Bow	Glasgow Clan	2	122:21	1	1	5	0	92.86%	2.45
Matt Greenfield	Sheffield Steelers	3	182:48	1	2	8	0	91.49%	2.63
Jason Grande	Nottingham Panthers	4	272:49	3	1	12	0	92.26%	2.64
Jackson Whistle	Belfast Giants	3	180:00	2	1	8	0	90.12%	2.67

== Challenge Cup ==
The Challenge Cup was split into two stages: an initial group stage where the league's ten teams were divided into two groups based on geographical distance – one group of six teams (Group A) and a group of four teams (Group B). The teams in Group A (the five English teams and the Cardiff Devils) played each of the other teams twice for a total of ten games, while the teams in Group B (the three Scottish teams and the Belfast Giants) played each of the other teams four times for a total of twelve games.

The top two teams in Group A and the winners of Group B qualified for the semi-finals. The runners-up in Group B faced the third-placed team in Group A in a one-off game, held at the arena of the team with a higher group stage points percentage, to determine the final semi-finalist.

=== Group stage ===
==== Group A ====
Pos	Team	Pld	W	OTW	OTL	L	GF	GA	GD	Pts	Qualification
1	Sheffield Steelers	10	5	2	2	1	38	30	+8	16	Qualification to semi-finals
2	Cardiff Devils	10	6	0	1	3	42	32	+10	13	Qualification to semi-finals
3	Nottingham Panthers	10	4	2	1	3	32	29	+3	13	Qualification to play-in match
4	Coventry Blaze	10	3	2	2	3	32	35	−3	12	
5	Manchester Storm	10	2	2	1	5	32	38	−6	9	
6	Guildford Flames	10	2	0	1	7	23	35	−12	5	

Source: Elite League
Rules for classification: 1) Points; 2) Games won in regulation time; 3) Number of games won; 4) Head-to-head results, ranked by criteria 1 to 3; 5) Fewest regulation losses; 6) Away game results, ranked by criteria 1 to 3; 7) Goals scored; 8) Goal difference; 9) Fewest penalty minutes; 10) Drawing of lots.

==== Group B ====
Pos	Team	Pld	W	OTW	OTL	L	GF	GA	GD	Pts	Qualification
1	Belfast Giants	12	8	2	1	1	49	24	+25	21	Qualification to semi-finals
2	Glasgow Clan	12	7	0	1	4	40	34	+6	15	Qualification to play-in match
3	Dundee Stars	12	3	1	1	7	38	41	−3	9	
4	Fife Flyers	12	2	1	1	8	28	56	−28	7	

Source: Elite League
Rules for classification: 1) Points; 2) Games won in regulation time; 3) Number of games won; 4) Head-to-head results, ranked by criteria 1 to 3; 5) Fewest regulation losses; 6) Away game results, ranked by criteria 1 to 3; 7) Goals scored; 8) Goal difference; 9) Fewest penalty minutes; 10) Drawing of lots.

=== Knockout stage ===
==== Bracket ====
Play-in match; (January 2025)
4	Nottingham Panthers	5
5	Glasgow Clan	1

Semi-finals; (February 2025)
1	Belfast Giants	3	0	3
4	Nottingham Panthers	0	2	2
2	Sheffield Steelers	5	1	6
3	Cardiff Devils	3	4	7

Final; (March 2025)
1	Belfast Giants	4
3	Cardiff Devils	0

==== Play-in match ====
22 January 2025; 19:30	Nottingham Panthers	5–1 (2–0, 1–1, 2–0)	Glasgow Clan	Nottingham Arena; Attendance: 3,813

Game reference

Jason Grande
Goalies
Landon Bow
Referees:
Joe Sewell
Chris Wells
Linesmen:
Danny Beresford
Ryan Fraley

Sam Herr (PPG) – 13:33	1–0
Cooper Zech – 14:11	2–0
	2–1	22:11 – Mitchell Heard
Mitch Fossier – 29:29	3–1
Matt Alfaro – 45:51	4–1
Hugo Roy – 50:22	5–1

2 min
Penalties
8 min
46
Shots
25

==== Semi-finals ====
As the highest seed from the group stage, the Belfast Giants selected the Nottingham Panthers to be their semi-final opponents, with the Sheffield Steelers taking on the Cardiff Devils as a result of this.

===== (1) Belfast Giants vs. (4) Nottingham Panthers =====
12 February 2025	Belfast Giants	3–0	Nottingham Panthers	SSE Arena Belfast; Attendance: 6,283	Recap
Mark Cooper – 8:51; Ciaran Long – 14:28		First period	No scoring
No scoring		Second period	No scoring
Jordan Kawaguchi – 7:48		Third period	No scoring
Jackson Whistle (31 shots / 31 saves)		Goalie stats	Jason Grande (30 shots / 27 saves)

26 February 2025	Nottingham Panthers	2–0	Belfast Giants	Nottingham Arena; Attendance: 5,263	Recap
No scoring		First period	No scoring
Zsombor Garát (PPG) – 12:17		Second period	No scoring
Cooper Zech – 0:37		Third period	No scoring
Jason Grande (32 shots / 32 saves)		Goalie stats	Jackson Whistle (29 shots / 27 saves)

Belfast Giants win 3–2 on aggregate.

===== (2) Sheffield Steelers vs. (3) Cardiff Devils =====
5 February 2025	Sheffield Steelers	5–3	Cardiff Devils	Sheffield Arena; Attendance: 6,277	Recap
Cole Shudra – 9:17; Joona Huttula – 13:52		First period	No scoring
Mitchell Balmas (PPG) – 10:21		Second period	2:25 – Joey Martin (PPG); 14:22 – Cole Sanford
Patrick Watling (PPG) – 2:23; Daniel Leavens (PPG) – 6:36		Third period	10:03 – Cole Sanford (2)
Matt Greenfield (16 shots / 13 saves)		Goalie stats	Mac Carruth (40 shots / 35 saves)

12 February 2025	Cardiff Devils	4–1	Sheffield Steelers	Ice Arena Wales; Attendance: 3,110	Recap
Cole Sanford – 13:55; Josh MacDonald – 19:00		First period	No scoring
Zach O'Brien – 10:45		Second period	No scoring
Joey Martin – 2:52		Third period	7:25 – Mitchell Balmas
Mac Carruth (29 shots / 28 saves)		Goalie stats	Matt Greenfield (30 shots / 26 saves)

Cardiff Devils win 7–6 on aggregate.

==== Final ====
As the highest remaining seed, the Belfast Giants had home advantage for the final against the Cardiff Devils.

12 March 2025; 19:00	Belfast Giants	4–0 (2–0, 2–0, 0–0)	Cardiff Devils	SSE Arena Belfast; Attendance: 6,149

Game reference

Jackson Whistle
Goalies
Mac Carruth
Referees:
Chris Wells
Andy Dalton
Linesmen:
Nathan Carmichael
Ryan Fraley

Ciaran Long – 6:35	1–0
J.J. Piccinich – 19:04	2–0
Jordan Kawaguchi – 21:29	3–0
Mark Cooper – 22:45	4–0

10 min
Penalties
4 min
32
Shots
37

=== Statistics ===
==== Scoring leaders ====
The following players led the league in points, at the conclusion of the Challenge Cup. If two or more skaters are tied (i.e. same number of points, goals and played games), all of the tied skaters are shown.

Player	Team	GP	G	A	Pts	+/–	PIM
Jordan Kawaguchi	Belfast Giants	14	8	11	19	+12	4
Mark Cooper	Belfast Giants	15	9	8	17	+8	6
Chase Gresock	Coventry Blaze	10	7	9	16	+8	16
Deven Sideroff	Glasgow Clan	13	8	7	15	+8	6
Scott Conway	Belfast Giants	12	5	10	15	+10	10
Mitchell Heard	Glasgow Clan	13	3	12	15	+9	55
Cole Sanford	Cardiff Devils	12	11	3	14	+4	8
Phélix Martineau	Fife Flyers	12	7	7	14	−5	6
Ryan Hughes	Manchester Storm	10	5	9	14	−4	6
J.J. Piccinich	Belfast Giants	15	6	7	13	+12	2

==== Leading goaltenders ====
The following goaltenders led the league in goals against average, provided that they have played at least 40% of their team's minutes, at the conclusion of the Challenge Cup.

Player	Team(s)	GP	TOI	W	L	GA	SO	SV%	GAA
Jackson Whistle	Belfast Giants	10	605:51	8	2	15	4	94.30%	1.49
Ryan Bednard	Nottingham Panthers	6	356:03	4	2	13	1	92.57%	2.19
Landon Bow	Glasgow Clan	8	480:04	4	4	23	1	91.39%	2.87
Matt Greenfield	Sheffield Steelers	10	605:03	8	2	29	0	89.18%	2.88
Mac Carruth	Cardiff Devils	7	367:56	4	3	18	0	89.71%	2.94
