= Mat Robson =

Canadian-British ice hockey goaltender (born 1996)

- Born: 26 March 1996 (age 30) Mississauga, Ontario, Canada
- Height: 191 cm (6 ft 3 in)
- Weight: 86 kg (190 lb; 13 st 8 lb)
- Position: Goaltender
- Catches: Left
- EIHL team Former teams: Nottingham Panthers; Coventry Blaze; Toronto Patriots; Lindsay Muskies; Penticton Vees; Minnesota Golden Gophers; Minnesota Wild; Iowa Wild; Straubing Tigers; Rochester Americans; Cincinnati Cyclones; Cracovia
- National team: Great Britain
- NHL draft: Undrafted
- Playing career: 2019–present

Mat Robson (born 26 March 1996) is a Canadian-born British professional ice hockey player who is currently a goaltender for the Nottingham Panthers of the Elite Ice Hockey League (EIHL). He has previously played for Coventry Blaze of the Elite Ice Hockey League (EIHL), teams in Canada, the United States, Germany, France and Poland.

== Career ==
Robsen was born on 26 March 1996 in Mississauga, Ontario, Canada. He played with the Toronto Patriots and the Lindsay Muskies in the Ontario Junior Hockey League (OJHL) and with the Penticton Vees in the British Columbia Hockey League (BCHL). He also played in three exhibition games with the Peterborough Petes.

Robson played in the National Collegiate Athletic Association (NCAA) with the University of Minnesota's Golden Gophers from the second half 2017/18 season and in the 2018/19 season. He made 14 starts and 14 appearances in his first season for the Gophers from December 2017. In his senior year, Robson was one of three finalists for Big Ten Goalie of the Year and set a program record with a .924 career save-percentage.

Robson became a free agent and signed for Minnesota Wild in the National Hockey League (NHL), then played during the 2019/20 season with Minnesota Wild's American Hockey League (AHL) affiliate team, Iowa Wild. He recorded a .901 save-percentage across 26 appearances at Iowa Wild.

Robson played for the Straubing Tigers in the Deutsche Eishockey Liga (DEL) for the 2020/21 season, making nine appearances and suffering minor injuries. He then transferred to the Rochester Americans and played for the Cincinnati Cyclones in the East Coast Hockey League (ECHL), where he recorded a .924 save-percentage in his first five games for the team. He played for Anglet Hormadi Élite in the French Ligue Magnus for the 2022/2023 season.

Robsen played for Cracovia of Kraków, Poland, in the Polska Hokej Liga during the second half of the 2023/2024 season, where he had a .944 save-percentage over seven games.

Robson began playing for Coventry Blaze in the UK Elite Ice Hockey League (EIHL) for the 2024/25 season. He ended his first season for Coventry Blaze with a .911 save-percentage. Robson returned to play for Coventry Blaze in the 2025/26 season.

Robson was called up for Great Britain men's national ice hockey team at the 2026 Men's Ice Hockey World Championships in Switzerland along with Coventry Blaze defenceman David Clements and forward Jack Hopkins. He made his debut for Great Britain during the pre World Championships series game against Italy on 2 May 2026, making 33 saves in a 4:1 victory for Great Britain.
