= 2023–24 EIHL season =

- League: Elite Ice Hockey League
- Sport: Ice hockey
- Duration: 22 September 2023 – 21 April 2024
- Matches: 330
- Teams: 10
- Total attendance: 1,133,816
- Average attendance: 3,532

Regular season
- Season champions: Sheffield Steelers
- Season MVP: Matt Greenfield (Sheffield Steelers)
- Top scorer: Mitchell Balmas (Sheffield Steelers); (66 points)

Challenge Cup
- Winners: Sheffield Steelers
- Runners-up: Guildford Flames

Playoffs
- Champions: Sheffield Steelers
- Runners-up: Belfast Giants

EIHL seasons
- 2022–23 2024–25

The 2023–24 EIHL season was the 20th anniversary season of the Elite Ice Hockey League. The regular season commenced on 23 September 2023, and the final match day was on 7 April 2024; the playoff quarter-finals were held over the weekend of 14 April and the Playoff final weekend was held the following weekend.

The Sheffield Steelers won their sixth league title – and first since 2015–16 – having opened up an unassailable 14-point lead over the Cardiff Devils with a 7–3 victory over the Guildford Flames on 24 March 2024. The Steelers had also won the Challenge Cup 11 days earlier, beating the Flames 3–1 in the final. The Steelers ultimately completed their first Grand Slam in the EIHL era, defeating the Belfast Giants 3–1 in the playoff final.

The season was marred by the death of Nottingham Panthers forward Adam Johnson during a Challenge Cup match between the Panthers and the Sheffield Steelers, held on 28 October, at the Sheffield Arena. Johnson had suffered a cut to his neck by the blade of a skate, and received emergency treatment on the ice before being transferred to the Northern General Hospital, but died from his injuries. The EIHL postponed all scheduled matches for the following day, 29 October, and subsequent matches on 31 October and 1 November were also postponed. Teams returned to action on 4 November, with the exception of Sheffield and Nottingham, who returned to the ice a week and two weeks later.

== Teams ==
The same ten teams that competed in 2022–23 competed in the 2023–24 season.

Locations of the EIHL 2023–24 teams

Team	City/Town	Arena	Capacity
Belfast Giants	(Northern Ireland) Belfast	SSE Arena Belfast	8,700
Cardiff Devils	(Wales) Cardiff	Vindico Arena	3,100
Coventry Blaze	(England) Coventry	Coventry Skydome	3,000
Dundee Stars	(Scotland) Dundee	Dundee Ice Arena	2,400
Fife Flyers	(Scotland) Kirkcaldy	Fife Ice Arena	3,525
Glasgow Clan	(Scotland) Glasgow	Braehead Arena	4,000
Guildford Flames	(England) Guildford	Guildford Spectrum	2,001
Manchester Storm	(England) Altrincham	Altrincham Ice Dome	2,351
Nottingham Panthers	(England) Nottingham	Motorpoint Arena Nottingham	7,500
Sheffield Steelers	(England) Sheffield	Utilita Arena Sheffield	9,300

== Regular season ==
=== League standings ===
Each team played 54 games, playing each of the other nine teams six times: three times on home ice, and three times away from home. Points were awarded for each game, where two points were awarded for all victories, regardless of whether it was in regulation time or after overtime or game-winning shots. One point was awarded for losing in overtime or game-winning shots, and zero points for losing in regulation time. At the end of the regular season, the team that finished with the most points was crowned the league champion, and qualified for the 2024–25 Champions Hockey League. The top eight teams qualified for the playoffs.

Pos	Team	Pld	W	OTW	OTL	L	GF	GA	GD	Pts	Qualification
1	Sheffield Steelers (C)	54	39	6	1	8	228	113	+115	91	Regular season champions Qualification to playoffs
2	Cardiff Devils	54	30	7	3	14	210	151	+59	77	Qualification to playoffs
3	Belfast Giants	54	28	4	7	15	182	147	+35	71	Qualification to playoffs
4	Manchester Storm	54	19	8	7	20	142	154	−12	61	Qualification to playoffs
5	Guildford Flames	54	17	7	10	20	160	165	−5	58	Qualification to playoffs
6	Coventry Blaze	54	11	12	6	25	147	185	−38	52	Qualification to playoffs
7	Dundee Stars	54	16	6	7	25	169	198	−29	51	Qualification to playoffs
8	Fife Flyers	54	14	6	11	23	166	202	−36	51	Qualification to playoffs
9	Nottingham Panthers	54	15	6	8	25	165	195	−30	50	
10	Glasgow Clan	54	10	9	11	24	175	234	−59	49	

Source: Elite League
Rules for classification: 1) Points; 2) Games won in regulation time; 3) Number of games won; 4) Head-to-head results, ranked by criteria 1 to 3; 5) Fewest regulation losses; 6) Away game results, ranked by criteria 1 to 3; 7) Goals scored; 8) Goal difference; 9) Fewest penalty minutes; 10) Drawing of lots.
(C) Champion

=== Statistics ===
==== Scoring leaders ====
The following players led the league in points, at the conclusion of the regular season. If two or more skaters are tied (i.e. same number of points, goals and played games), all of the tied skaters are shown.

Player	Team	GP	G	A	Pts	+/–	PIM
Mitchell Balmas	Sheffield Steelers	54	23	43	66	+23	8
Troy Lajeunesse	Fife Flyers	52	28	32	60	+1	26
Ryan Valentini	Dundee Stars	53	27	33	60	–11	18
Spencer Naas	Dundee Stars	54	32	27	59	+1	2
Cole Sanford	Cardiff Devils	54	29	29	58	+13	56
Patrick Watling	Sheffield Steelers	53	22	36	58	+27	16
Gary Haden	Glasgow Clan	54	27	29	56	–25	30
Marcus Crawford	Cardiff Devils	54	4	51	55	+25	70
Marc-Olivier Vallerand	Sheffield Steelers	49	24	29	53	+27	38
Kyle Osterberg	Fife Flyers	47	22	31	53	+2	28

==== Leading goaltenders ====
The following goaltenders led the league in goals against average, provided that they have played at least 40% of their team's minutes, at the conclusion of the regular season.

Player	Team(s)	GP	TOI	W	L	GA	SO	SV%	GAA
Matt Greenfield	Sheffield Steelers	47	2826:00	38	9	91	8	92.96%	1.93
Eamon McAdam	Guildford Flames	30	1794:44	14	15	75	2	91.88%	2.51
Evan Weninger	Manchester Storm	47	2795:17	23	23	118	3	92.93%	2.53
Ben Bowns	Cardiff Devils	38	2257:12	25	12	97	5	92.38%	2.58
Tyler Beskorowany	Belfast Giants	36	2049:28	21	14	96	1	89.39%	2.81

== Playoffs ==
=== Bracket ===
In the two-legged quarter-finals, the highest-ranked team met the lowest-ranked team, the second-highest-ranked team met the second-lowest-ranked team and so forth. The winners of each tie was determined by aggregate scoring over the two games. In the semi-finals, the highest remaining seed was matched against the lowest remaining seed, with the other two teams facing off. The winners of the semi-finals progressed to the Final, with the losers playing in the third-place match.

Quarter-finals (12–14 April)
1	Sheffield Steelers	9	4	13
8	Fife Flyers	4	1	5
2	Cardiff Devils	4	3	7
7	Dundee Stars	2	2	4
(Pairings are reseeded after the first round)
3	Belfast Giants	2	1	3
6	Coventry Blaze	1	1	2
4	Manchester Storm	1	0	1
5	Guildford Flames	5	4	9

Semi-finals (20 April)
1	Sheffield Steelers	6
5	Guildford Flames	3
2	Cardiff Devils	1
3	Belfast Giants	2

Final (21 April)
1	Sheffield Steelers	3
3	Belfast Giants	1
Third place
2	Cardiff Devils	7
5	Guildford Flames	5

=== Quarter-finals ===
The quarter-final schedule was announced on 7 April 2024, following the conclusion of the final-day regular season matches.

==== (1) Sheffield Steelers vs. (8) Fife Flyers ====
12 April 2024	Sheffield Steelers	9–4	Fife Flyers	IceSheffield; Attendance:1,498	Recap
Mitchell Balmas (1) – 10:40		First period	17:14 – Troy Lajeunesse (1)
Cole Shudra (1) – 2:58; Mitchell Balmas (2) – 4:18; Cole Shudra (2) – 11:04; Sam Jones (1) – 14:57		Second period	9:33 – Max Humitz (1)
Brandon Whistle (1) – 1:42; Mikko Juusola (1) – 2:55; Marc-Olivier Vallerand (1) – 10:36; Brett Neumann (1) – 17:47		Third period	8:17 – Max Humitz (2); 17:20 – Collin Shirley (1)
Matt Greenfield (22 shots / 18 saves)		Goalie stats	Shane Owen (35 shots / 26 saves)

14 April 2024	Fife Flyers	1–4	Sheffield Steelers	Fife Ice Arena; Attendance:1,823	Recap
No scoring		First period	13:44 – Kevin Tansey (1); 19:44 – Mikko Juusola (2)
No scoring		Second period	9:24 – Marc-Olivier Vallerand (1)
Collin Shirley (2) – 14:27		Third period	19:12 – Brett Neumann (2)
Shane Owen (40 shots / 36 saves)		Goalie stats	Anthony Morrone (32 shots / 31 saves)

Sheffield Steelers win 13–5 on aggregate.

==== (2) Cardiff Devils vs. (7) Dundee Stars ====
13 April 2024	Cardiff Devils	4–2	Dundee Stars	Ice Arena Wales; Attendance: 3,100	Recap
Sam Duggan (1) – 17:37		First period	No scoring
Tyler Busch (1) – 1:27; Bode Wilde (1; PPG) – 13:13		Second period	0:54 – Ryan Valentini (1); 6:16 – Jake Elmer (1)
Tyler Busch (2) – 1:40		Third period	No scoring
Ben Bowns (28 shots / 26 saves)		Goalie stats	Lucas Brine (33 shots / 29 saves)

14 April 2024	Dundee Stars	2–3	Cardiff Devils	Dundee Ice Arena; Attendance:2,069	Recap
Spencer Naas (1) – 3:11		First period	6:09 – Jamie Arniel (1)
No scoring		Second period	19:21 – Justin Crandall (1)
Drydn Dow (1; PPG) – 18:14		Third period	1:27 – Jamie Arniel (2; SHG)
Lucas Brine (28 shots / 25 saves)		Goalie stats	Ben Bowns (52 shots / 50 saves)

Cardiff Devils win 7–4 on aggregate.

==== (3) Belfast Giants vs. (6) Coventry Blaze ====
13 April 2024	Belfast Giants	2–1	Coventry Blaze	SSE Arena Belfast; Attendance: 7,411	Recap
No scoring		First period	No scoring
Oliver Cooper (1) – 0:19; Ben Lake (1; PPG) – 11:28		Second period	4:58 – Mitch Cook (1; PPG)
No scoring		Third period	No scoring
Jackson Whistle (24 shots / 23 saves)		Goalie stats	Taran Kozun (36 shots / 34 saves)

14 April 2024	Coventry Blaze	1–1	Belfast Giants	Coventry Skydome; Attendance:1,951	Recap
No scoring		First period	No scoring
No scoring		Second period	6:43 – Daniel Tedesco (1)
Danny Kristo (1; EA) – 19:59		Third period	No scoring
Taran Kozun (22 shots / 21 saves)		Goalie stats	Jackson Whistle (18 shots / 17 saves)

Belfast Giants win 3–2 on aggregate.

==== (4) Manchester Storm vs. (5) Guildford Flames ====
13 April 2024	Manchester Storm	1–5	Guildford Flames	Altrincham Ice Dome; Attendance:2,027	Recap
No scoring		First period	5:28 – Ryan Hughes (1; PPG); 8:48 – Matt Tugnutt (1)
No scoring		Second period	1:59 – Steven McParland (1); 16:50 – Bradley Lalonde (1; PPG)
Mitchell Martan (1) – 7:51		Third period	2:08 – Ryan Tait (1)
Evan Weninger (34 shots / 29 saves)		Goalie stats	Taz Burman (37 shots / 36 saves)

14 April 2024	Guildford Flames	4–0	Manchester Storm	Guildford Spectrum; Attendance: 1,956	Recap
Nicolas Ouellet (1) – 0:16		First period	No scoring
Ryan Tait (2) – 5:42; Bradley Lalonde (2) – 8:13		Second period	No scoring
Ryan Tait (3; PPG) – 7:51		Third period	No scoring
Taz Burman (20 shots / 20 saves)		Goalie stats	Evan Weninger (47 shots / 43 saves)

Guildford Flames win 9–1 on aggregate.

=== Semi-finals ===
Following the conclusion of the quarter-final matchups, the schedule for the Finals weekend was confirmed.

20 April 2024; 15:00	Sheffield Steelers	6–3 (1–0, 0–1, 5–2)	Guildford Flames	Nottingham Arena

Game reference

Matt Greenfield
Goalies
Taz Burman
Referees:
Chris Wells
Andy Dalton
Linesmen:
Ilia Kisil
Andrew Cook

Josh Nicholls (1; PPG) – 19:42	1–0
	1–1	28:10 – Jordan Klimek (1)
	1–2	43:21 – Matt Alvaro (1)
Brien Diffley (1) – 44:36	2–2
Mitchell Balmas (3) – 49:37	3–2
	3–3	52:35 – Steven McParland (2)
Brandon Whistle (2) – 54:26	4–3
Daniel Ciampini (1) – 55:45	5–3
Scott Allen (1; ENG) – 59:00	6–3

8 min
Penalties
8 min
40
Shots
25

20 April 2024; 19:00	Cardiff Devils	1–2 (OT) (0–0, 0–1, 1–0, 0–1)	Belfast Giants	Nottingham Arena

Game reference

Ben Bowns
Goalies
Jackson Whistle
Referees:
Tom Pering
David Good
Linesmen:
Danny Beresford
Scott Rodger

	0–1	38:57 – Blake Speers (1)
Cody Donaghey (1; PPG) – 56:44	1–1
	1–2	68:05 – Greg Printz (1)

4 min
Penalties
6 min
21
Shots
36

=== Third-place match ===
21 April 2024; 13:00	Cardiff Devils	7–5 (1–1, 4–1, 2–3)	Guildford Flames	Nottingham Arena

Game reference

Tyler Wall
Goalies
Adam Long
Referees:
Dean Smith
Graham Rodger
Linesmen:
James Nelson
Lee Young

Sam Duggan (2) – 11:22	1–0
	1–1	15:48 – Nicolas Ouellet (2)
Cole Sanford – 21:48	2–1
Cole Ully – 22:13	3–1
	3–2	25:09 – Ryan Tait (4)
Tyler Busch (3) – 29:06	4–2
Cody Donaghey (2) – 33:54	5–2
Riley Brandt (1) – 44:46	6–2
	6–3	47:16 – Lewis Hook (1)
	6–4	49:33 – Nicolas Ouellet (3)
Joey Martin (1) – 55:28	7–4
	7–5	57:58 – Turner Ripplinger (1)

2 min
Penalties
0 min
37
Shots
35

=== Final ===
21 April 2024; 17:00	Sheffield Steelers	3–1 (2–0, 0–1, 1–0)	Belfast Giants	Nottingham Arena; Attendance: 6,735

Game reference

Matt Greenfield
Goalies
Jackson Whistle
Referees:
Tom Pering
Andy Dalton
Linesmen:
Danny Beresford
Ilia Kisil

Daniel Ciampini (2; PPG) – 15:49	1–0
Mikko Juusola (3; PPG) – 16:24	2–0
	2–1	39:52 – Blake Speers (2; PPG)
Kevin Tansey (2; ENG) – 58:57	3–1

10 min
Penalties
7 min
30
Shots
30

=== Statistics ===
==== Scoring leaders ====
The following players led the league in points, at the conclusion of the playoffs. If two or more skaters are tied (i.e. same number of points, goals and played games), all of the tied skaters are shown.

Player	Team	GP	G	A	Pts	+/–	PIM
Ryan Tait	Guildford Flames	4	4	2	6	+1	0
Mitchell Balmas	Sheffield Steelers	4	3	3	6	+2	0
Steven McParland	Guildford Flames	4	3	2	5	+5	0
Scott Allen	Sheffield Steelers	4	1	4	5	+6	2
Josh Nicholls	Sheffield Steelers	4	1	4	5	+3	0
Mikko Juusola	Sheffield Steelers	4	3	1	4	+3	2
Nicolas Ouellet	Guildford Flames	4	3	1	4	+3	2
Jamie Arniel	Cardiff Devils	4	2	2	4	0	2
Daniel Ciampini	Sheffield Steelers	4	2	2	4	+3	4
Sam Jones	Sheffield Steelers	4	1	3	4	+4	0

==== Leading goaltenders ====
The following goaltenders led the league in goals against average, provided that they have played at least 40% of their team's minutes, at the conclusion of the playoffs.

Player	Team(s)	GP	TOI	W	L	GA	SO	SV%	GAA
Jackson Whistle	Belfast Giants	4	246:22	2	1	5	0	94.57%	1.22
Taran Kozun	Coventry Blaze	2	117:58	0	1	3	0	94.92%	1.53
Ben Bowns	Cardiff Devils	3	188:05	2	1	6	0	94.83%	1.91
Taz Burman	Guildford Flames	3	177:39	2	1	6	1	93.75%	2.03
Matt Greenfield	Sheffield Steelers	3	180:00	3	0	8	0	89.61%	2.67

== Challenge Cup ==
The Challenge Cup was split into two stages: an initial group stage where the league's ten teams were divided into three groups based on geographical distance – one group of four teams (Group A) and two groups of three teams (Groups B and C). The three group winners, along with the five best remaining teams on win percentage qualified for the knockout stage. The quarter-finals and semi-finals were held over two legs, with a one-off final.

=== Group stage ===
==== Group A ====
Pos	Team	Pld	W	OTW	OTL	L	GF	GA	GD	Pts	Qualification
1	Belfast Giants	6	6	0	0	0	27	11	+16	12	Qualification to knockout stage
2	Fife Flyers	6	3	0	0	3	19	18	+1	6	Qualification to knockout stage
3	Glasgow Clan	6	2	0	0	4	15	21	−6	4	Qualification to knockout stage
4	Dundee Stars	6	1	0	0	5	15	26	−11	2	

Source: Elite League
Rules for classification: 1) Points; 2) Games won in regulation time; 3) Number of games won; 4) Head-to-head results, ranked by criteria 1 to 3; 5) Fewest regulation losses; 6) Away game results, ranked by criteria 1 to 3; 7) Goals scored; 8) Goal difference; 9) Fewest penalty minutes; 10) Drawing of lots.

==== Group B ====
Pos	Team	Pld	W	OTW	OTL	L	GF	GA	GD	Pts	Qualification
1	Cardiff Devils	8	6	0	0	2	36	22	+14	12	Qualification to knockout stage
2	Guildford Flames	8	3	1	0	4	26	31	−5	8	Qualification to knockout stage
3	Coventry Blaze	8	2	0	1	5	18	27	−9	5	Qualification to knockout stage

Source: Elite League
Rules for classification: 1) Points; 2) Games won in regulation time; 3) Number of games won; 4) Head-to-head results, ranked by criteria 1 to 3; 5) Fewest regulation losses; 6) Away game results, ranked by criteria 1 to 3; 7) Goals scored; 8) Goal difference; 9) Fewest penalty minutes; 10) Drawing of lots.

==== Group C ====
Following the death of Adam Johnson, the Nottingham Panthers withdrew from the Challenge Cup on 8 November 2023. The game between the Sheffield Steelers and Nottingham, which was being led 2–1 by Sheffield at the time of its abandonment, was not considered in the standings or for potential tie-breaking scenarios between Sheffield and the Belfast Giants.

Pos	Team	Pld	W	OTW	OTL	L	GF	GA	GD	Pts	Qualification
1	Sheffield Steelers	6	6	0	0	0	30	8	+22	12	Qualification to knockout stage
2	Manchester Storm	6	1	0	0	5	16	28	−12	2	Qualification to knockout stage
3	Nottingham Panthers	4	1	0	0	3	9	19	−10	2	Withdrew from the competition

Source: Elite League
Rules for classification: 1) Points; 2) Games won in regulation time; 3) Number of games won; 4) Head-to-head results, ranked by criteria 1 to 3; 5) Fewest regulation losses; 6) Away game results, ranked by criteria 1 to 3; 7) Goals scored; 8) Goal difference; 9) Fewest penalty minutes; 10) Drawing of lots.

=== Knockout stage ===
Quarter-finals (December 2023)
1	Sheffield Steelers	5	5	10
8	Manchester Storm	1	1	2
2	Belfast Giants	1	4	5
7	Coventry Blaze	1	5	6
(Pairings are reseeded after the first round)
3	Cardiff Devils	4	1	5
6	Glasgow Clan	3	3	6
4	Fife Flyers	1	2	3
5	Guildford Flames	3	3	6

Semi-finals (January & February 2024)
1	Sheffield Steelers	6	4	10
7	Coventry Blaze	0	1	1
5	Guildford Flames	0	6	6
6	Glasgow Clan	0	3	3

Final (13 March 2024)
1	Sheffield Steelers	3
5	Guildford Flames	1

==== Quarter-finals ====
Following the conclusion of the league phase of the Challenge Cup, the quarter-final matchups (except for Belfast–Coventry) were determined on 29 November 2023. The Belfast–Coventry game dates were confirmed two days later.

===== (1) Sheffield Steelers vs. (8) Manchester Storm =====
7 December 2023	Manchester Storm	1–5	Sheffield Steelers	Altrincham Ice Dome; Attendance:1,001	Recap
Michael Korol – 6:46		First period	19:59 – Robert Dowd (PPG)
No scoring		Second period	2:27 – Scott Allen; 4:22 – Marc-Olivier Vallerand (PPG)
No scoring		Third period	6:59 – Patrick Watling; 10:53 – Brandon Whistle
Evan Weninger (38 shots / 33 saves)		Goalie stats	Anthony Morrone (38 shots / 37 saves)

20 December 2023	Sheffield Steelers	5–1	Manchester Storm	Sheffield Arena; Attendance:5,718	Recap
Cole Shudra – 11:46; Mitchell Balmas (PPG) – 16:58; Mitchell Balmas (2; PPG) – 17:59		First period	No scoring
Brandon Whistle – 8:10		Second period	No scoring
Brett Neumann (PPG) – 16:49		Third period	6:12 – Tyler Hinam
Anthony Morrone (27 shots / 26 saves)		Goalie stats	Alex Oldale (39 shots / 34 saves)

Sheffield Steelers win 10–2 on aggregate.

===== (2) Belfast Giants vs. (7) Coventry Blaze =====
13 December 2023	Coventry Blaze	1–1	Belfast Giants	Coventry Skydome; Attendance:1,216	Recap
Kim Tallberg – 10:55		First period	No scoring
No scoring		Second period	No scoring
No scoring		Third period	2:45 – Matthew McLeod
Taran Kozun (32 shots / 31 saves)		Goalie stats	Tyler Beskorowany (27 shots / 26 saves)

20 December 2023	Belfast Giants	4–5	SO	Coventry Blaze	SSE Arena; Attendance : 4,438	Recap
Ara Nazarian – 16:26		First period		No scoring
Henrik Eriksson – 13:23		Second period		No scoring
Quinn Preston – 1:12; Henrik Eriksson (2) – 3:42		Third period		5:52 – Kim Tallberg; 11:01 – David Clements; 11:41 – Alessio Luciani; 13:18 – J. D. Dudek
Quinn Preston (miss); Ben Lake; Matthew McLeod (miss); Ciaran Long; Daniel Tedesco		Shootout		Kobe Roth; Danny Kristo; J. D. Dudek; Ian McNulty; Kim Tallberg
Tyler Beskorowany (17 shots / 13 saves)		Goalie stats		Taran Kozun (40 shots / 36 saves)

Coventry Blaze win 6–5 on aggregate.

===== (3) Cardiff Devils vs. (6) Glasgow Clan =====
6 December 2023	Glasgow Clan	3–4	Cardiff Devils	Braehead Arena; Attendance:2,015	Recap
Darien Craighead (PPG) – 8:05; Michael Pelech (PPG) – 12:03; Jake Bolton (PPG) – 15:59		First period	0:43 – Brandon Alderson
No scoring		Second period	4:14 – Trevor Cox; 11:32 – Brandon Alderson (2)
No scoring		Third period	8:36 – Trevor Cox (2)
Antti Karjalainen (27 shots / 23 saves)		Goalie stats	Tyler Wall (37 shots / 34 saves)

13 December 2023	Cardiff Devils	1–3	Glasgow Clan	Ice Arena Wales; Attendance:2,642	Recap
No scoring		First period	7:57 – Gary Haden; 13:25 – Jake Bolton
Josh Waller – 7:41		Second period	No scoring
No scoring		Third period	2:01 – Darien Craighead
Ben Bowns (29 shots / 26 saves)		Goalie stats	Jake Kielly (36 shots / 35 saves)

Glasgow Clan win 6–5 on aggregate.

===== (4) Fife Flyers vs. (5) Guildford Flames =====
6 December 2023	Fife Flyers	1–3	Guildford Flames	Fife Ice Arena; Attendance:822	Recap
Max Humitz – 11:29		First period	3:37 – Peter Crinella; 5:24 – Patrick Bajkov
No scoring		Second period	15:26 – Peter Crinella (2)
No scoring		Third period	No scoring
Shane Owen (42 shots / 39 saves)		Goalie stats	Eamon McAdam (27 shots / 26 saves)

13 December 2023	Guildford Flames	3–2	Fife Flyers	Guildford Spectrum; Attendance:1,319	Recap
Steven McParland (PPG) – 16:27; Ryan Tait – 18:29		First period	No scoring
Austin Glover – 13:00		Second period	14:15 – Kyle Osterberg
No scoring		Third period	10:09 – Vitalijs Pavlovs (PPG)
Eamon McAdam (28 shots / 26 saves)		Goalie stats	Shane Owen (38 shots / 35 saves)

Guildford Flames win 6–3 on aggregate.

==== Semi-finals ====
The game dates for the Sheffield–Coventry matchup were confirmed on 21 December 2023, with the Guildford–Glasgow matchup dates not confirmed until 4 January 2024.

===== (1) Sheffield Steelers vs. (7) Coventry Blaze =====
24 January 2024	Coventry Blaze	0–6	Sheffield Steelers	Coventry Skydome; Attendance:1,681	Recap
No scoring		First period	0:12 – Mark Simpson; 2:06 – Robert Dowd; 9:40 – Daniel Ciampini; 12:42 – Scott Allen; 16:17 – Patrick Watling
No scoring		Second period	9:51 – Scott Allen (2)
No scoring		Third period	No scoring
Taran Kozun (32 shots / 26 saves)		Goalie stats	Matt Greenfield (31 shots / 31 saves)

31 January 2024	Sheffield Steelers	4–1	Coventry Blaze	Sheffield Arena; Attendance: 5,633	Recap
Sam Jones – 12:16; Brien Diffley – 17:57		First period	No scoring
Robert Dowd – 9:34; Mitchell Balmas – 19:02		Second period	14:39 – Danny Kristo
No scoring		Third period	No scoring
Anthony Morrone (14 shots / 13 saves)		Goalie stats	Nolan Kent (32 shots / 28 saves)

Sheffield Steelers win 10–1 on aggregate.

===== (5) Guildford Flames vs. (6) Glasgow Clan =====
20 January 2024	Glasgow Clan	0–0	Guildford Flames	Braehead Arena; Attendance: 3,620	Recap
No scoring		First period	No scoring
No scoring		Second period	No scoring
No scoring		Third period	No scoring
Antti Karjalainen (19 shots / 19 saves)		Goalie stats	Eamon McAdam (24 shots / 24 saves)

7 February 2024	Guildford Flames	6–3	Glasgow Clan	Guildford Spectrum; Attendance: 1,618	Recap
Ryan Tait – 3:32; Steven McParland – 6:33		First period	15:34 – Luke Lynch
Ryan Tait (2) – 4:57; Matt Tugnutt – 10:04		Second period	17:05 – Luke Lynch (2)
Lewis Hook (PPG) – 6:58; Peter Crinella (ENG) – 18:13		Third period	7:44 – Alex Roach
Eamon McAdam (30 shots / 27 saves)		Goalie stats	Kevin Lindskoug (34 shots / 29 saves)

Guildford Flames win 6–3 on aggregate.

==== Final ====
As number 1 seeds, the Sheffield Steelers hosted the final on 13 March, at Sheffield Arena.

13 March 2024; 19:30	Sheffield Steelers	3–1 (2–1, 1–0, 0–0)	Guildford Flames	Sheffield Arena; Attendance: 9,206

Game reference

Matt Greenfield
Goalies
Taz Burman
Referees:
Andy Dalton
David Good
Linesmen:
Danny Beresford
Ryan Fraley

Brien Diffley – 2:00	1–0
	1–1	13:48 – Bradley Lalonde
Patrick Watling (PPG) – 19:41	2–1
Mitchell Balmas – 24:35	3–1

4 min
Penalties
4 min
17
Shots
35

=== Statistics ===
==== Scoring leaders ====
The following players led the league in points, at the conclusion of the Challenge Cup. If two or more skaters are tied (i.e. same number of points, goals and played games), all of the tied skaters are shown.

Player	Team	GP	G	A	Pts	+/–	PIM
Mitchell Balmas	Sheffield Steelers	12	6	11	17	+7	4
Patrick Watling	Sheffield Steelers	12	5	10	15	+11	2
Ryan Tait	Guildford Flames	13	9	5	14	+3	2
Marc-Olivier Vallerand	Sheffield Steelers	11	6	8	14	+9	2
Daniel Ciampini	Sheffield Steelers	12	4	9	13	+7	10
Trevor Cox	Cardiff Devils	10	6	6	12	+8	4
Marcus Crawford	Cardiff Devils	10	1	11	12	+10	12
Peter Crinella	Guildford Flames	13	8	3	11	+3	4
Mark Cooper	Belfast Giants	7	4	7	11	+5	2
Mikko Juusola	Sheffield Steelers	12	0	11	11	+9	6

==== Leading goaltenders ====
The following goaltenders led the league in goals against average, provided that they have played at least 40% of their team's minutes, at the conclusion of the Challenge Cup.

Player	Team(s)	GP	TOI	W	L	GA	SO	SV%	GAA
Anthony Morrone	Sheffield Steelers	8	453:47 (Note: Morrone is credited by the EIHL as having played 20 minutes in the game against the Nottingham Panthers on 28 October, despite 33:47 having been played.)	8	0	11	0	94.47%	1.45
Tyler Beskorowany	Belfast Giants	6	354:23	4	1	12	0	90.77%	2.03
Ben Bowns	Cardiff Devils	6	342:27	4	2	13	1	92.40%	2.28
Eamon McAdam	Guildford Flames	6	341:01	4	1	13	1	91.03%	2.29
Jake Kielly	Glasgow Clan	6 (Note: Kielly is credited by the EIHL as having played 5 games, with an appearance of 32:18 – in relief of Antti Karjalainen – against the Dundee Stars on 12 November missing.)	329:45	3	2	13	1	92.74%	2.37
