= 2024 IIHF World Championship rosters =

Each team's roster consisted of at least 15 skaters (forwards and defencemen) and two goaltenders, and at most 22 skaters and three goaltenders. All 16 participating nations, through confirmation by their respective national associations, were required to submit a roster by the first IIHF directorate meeting.

Age and team as of 10 May 2024. Flags are only for foreign coaches.

== Group A ==
=== Austria ===
A 27-player roster was announced on 30 April 2024. The final squad was revealed on 6 May.

Head coach: (Switzerland) Roger Bader

| No. | Pos. | Name | Height | Weight | Birthdate | Team |
|---|---|---|---|---|---|---|
| 3 | F | Peter Schneider | 1.83 m (6 ft 0 in) | 91 kg (201 lb) | 4 April 1991 (aged 33) | (Austria) Red Bull Salzburg |
| 5 | F | Thomas Raffl – C | 1.94 m (6 ft 4 in) | 104 kg (229 lb) | 19 June 1986 (aged 37) | (Austria) Red Bull Salzburg |
| 9 | F | Ali Wukovits | 1.84 m (6 ft 0 in) | 83 kg (183 lb) | 9 May 1996 (aged 28) | (Austria) Red Bull Salzburg |
| 12 | D | David Maier | 1.87 m (6 ft 2 in) | 85 kg (187 lb) | 12 January 2000 (aged 24) | (Austria) EC KAC |
| 14 | D | Kilian Zündel | 1.80 m (5 ft 11 in) | 79 kg (174 lb) | 17 January 2001 (aged 23) | (Switzerland) HC Ambrì-Piotta |
| 16 | F | Dominic Zwerger | 1.83 m (6 ft 0 in) | 93 kg (205 lb) | 16 July 1996 (aged 27) | (Switzerland) HC Ambrì-Piotta |
| 17 | F | Manuel Ganahl – A | 1.82 m (6 ft 0 in) | 81 kg (179 lb) | 12 July 1990 (aged 33) | (Austria) EC KAC |
| 18 | D | Paul Stapelfeldt | 1.97 m (6 ft 6 in) | 100 kg (220 lb) | 20 September 1998 (aged 25) | (Austria) Red Bull Salzburg |
| 19 | F | Vinzenz Rohrer | 1.80 m (5 ft 11 in) | 76 kg (168 lb) | 9 September 2004 (aged 19) | (Switzerland) ZSC Lions |
| 20 | D | Nico Brunner | 1.81 m (5 ft 11 in) | 78 kg (172 lb) | 17 September 1992 (aged 31) | (Austria) Vienna Capitals |
| 21 | F | Lukas Haudum | 1.83 m (6 ft 0 in) | 84 kg (185 lb) | 21 May 1997 (aged 26) | (Austria) EC KAC |
| 23 | F | Marco Rossi | 1.76 m (5 ft 9 in) | 83 kg (183 lb) | 23 September 2001 (aged 22) | (United States) Minnesota Wild |
| 24 | D | Steven Strong | 1.83 m (6 ft 0 in) | 87 kg (192 lb) | 16 February 1993 (aged 31) | (Austria) EC KAC |
| 29 | G | Thomas Höneckl | 1.88 m (6 ft 2 in) | 92 kg (203 lb) | 10 October 1989 (aged 34) | (Austria) Steinbach Black Wings Linz |
| 30 | G | David Kickert | 1.88 m (6 ft 2 in) | 84 kg (185 lb) | 16 March 1994 (aged 30) | (Austria) Red Bull Salzburg |
| 31 | G | David Madlener | 1.87 m (6 ft 2 in) | 88 kg (194 lb) | 31 March 1992 (aged 32) | (Austria) Pioneers Vorarlberg |
| 32 | D | Bernd Wolf | 1.78 m (5 ft 10 in) | 84 kg (185 lb) | 23 February 1997 (aged 27) | (Switzerland) HC Lugano |
| 48 | F | Lucas Thaler | 1.80 m (5 ft 11 in) | 76 kg (168 lb) | 21 January 2002 (aged 22) | (Austria) Red Bull Salzburg |
| 52 | F | Paul Huber | 1.93 m (6 ft 4 in) | 101 kg (223 lb) | 10 June 2000 (aged 23) | (Austria) Red Bull Salzburg |
| 70 | F | Benjamin Nissner | 1.81 m (5 ft 11 in) | 80 kg (180 lb) | 30 November 1997 (aged 26) | (Austria) Red Bull Salzburg |
| 78 | D | Thimo Nickl | 1.88 m (6 ft 2 in) | 80 kg (180 lb) | 4 December 2001 (aged 22) | (United States) Wheeling Nailers |
| 91 | D | Dominique Heinrich – A | 1.75 m (5 ft 9 in) | 76 kg (168 lb) | 31 July 1990 (aged 33) | (Austria) Vienna Capitals |
| 92 | D | Clemens Unterweger | 1.83 m (6 ft 0 in) | 85 kg (187 lb) | 1 April 1992 (aged 32) | (Austria) EC KAC |
| 96 | F | Mario Huber | 1.88 m (6 ft 2 in) | 85 kg (187 lb) | 8 August 1996 (aged 27) | (Austria) Red Bull Salzburg |
| 98 | F | Benjamin Baumgartner | 1.78 m (5 ft 10 in) | 78 kg (172 lb) | 22 April 2000 (aged 24) | (Switzerland) SC Bern |

=== Canada ===
A 22-player roster was announced on 3 May 2024. Four days later, Pierre-Luc Dubois, Brandon Hagel and Nick Paul were added to the roster, while Macklin Celebrini and Adam Fantilli left the team. On 10 May, John Tavares was added to the roster.

Head coach: André Tourigny

| No. | Pos. | Name | Height | Weight | Birthdate | Team |
|---|---|---|---|---|---|---|
| 3 | D | Olen Zellweger | 1.80 m (5 ft 11 in) | 83 kg (183 lb) | 10 September 2003 (aged 20) | (United States) Anaheim Ducks |
| 4 | D | Bowen Byram | 1.85 m (6 ft 1 in) | 89 kg (196 lb) | 13 June 2001 (aged 22) | (United States) Buffalo Sabres |
| 8 | F | Michael Bunting | 1.83 m (6 ft 0 in) | 85 kg (187 lb) | 17 September 1995 (aged 28) | (United States) Pittsburgh Penguins |
| 13 | F | Brandon Tanev | 1.83 m (6 ft 0 in) | 82 kg (181 lb) | 31 December 1991 (aged 32) | (United States) Seattle Kraken |
| 14 | F | Dylan Guenther | 1.88 m (6 ft 2 in) | 79 kg (174 lb) | 10 April 2003 (aged 21) | (United States) Arizona Coyotes |
| 17 | F | Jack McBain | 1.93 m (6 ft 4 in) | 96 kg (212 lb) | 6 January 2000 (aged 24) | (United States) Arizona Coyotes |
| 18 | F | Dawson Mercer | 1.83 m (6 ft 0 in) | 82 kg (181 lb) | 27 October 2001 (aged 22) | (United States) New Jersey Devils |
| 19 | F | Jared McCann | 1.85 m (6 ft 1 in) | 84 kg (185 lb) | 31 May 1996 (aged 27) | (United States) Seattle Kraken |
| 20 | F | Nick Paul | 1.93 m (6 ft 4 in) | 102 kg (225 lb) | 20 March 1995 (aged 29) | (United States) Tampa Bay Lightning |
| 21 | D | Kaiden Guhle | 1.91 m (6 ft 3 in) | 92 kg (203 lb) | 18 January 2002 (aged 22) | (Canada) Montreal Canadiens |
| 22 | F | Dylan Cozens | 1.91 m (6 ft 3 in) | 85 kg (187 lb) | 9 February 2001 (aged 23) | (United States) Buffalo Sabres |
| 24 | D | Jamie Oleksiak | 2.01 m (6 ft 7 in) | 116 kg (256 lb) | 21 December 1992 (aged 31) | (United States) Seattle Kraken |
| 25 | D | Owen Power | 1.99 m (6 ft 6 in) | 100 kg (220 lb) | 22 November 2002 (aged 21) | (United States) Buffalo Sabres |
| 30 | G | Joel Hofer | 1.96 m (6 ft 5 in) | 78 kg (172 lb) | 30 July 2000 (aged 23) | (United States) St. Louis Blues |
| 35 | G | Nico Daws | 1.93 m (6 ft 4 in) | 92 kg (203 lb) | 22 December 2000 (aged 23) | (United States) New Jersey Devils |
| 38 | F | Brandon Hagel | 1.80 m (5 ft 11 in) | 79 kg (174 lb) | 27 August 1998 (aged 25) | (United States) Tampa Bay Lightning |
| 50 | G | Jordan Binnington | 1.89 m (6 ft 2 in) | 85 kg (187 lb) | 11 July 1993 (aged 30) | (United States) St. Louis Blues |
| 55 | D | Colton Parayko – A | 1.96 m (6 ft 5 in) | 97 kg (214 lb) | 12 May 1993 (aged 30) | (United States) St. Louis Blues |
| 71 | F | Ridly Greig | 1.80 m (5 ft 11 in) | 75 kg (165 lb) | 8 August 2002 (aged 21) | (Canada) Ottawa Senators |
| 78 | D | Damon Severson – A | 1.88 m (6 ft 2 in) | 93 kg (205 lb) | 7 August 1994 (aged 29) | (United States) Columbus Blue Jackets |
| 80 | F | Pierre-Luc Dubois | 1.91 m (6 ft 3 in) | 99 kg (218 lb) | 24 June 1998 (aged 25) | (United States) Los Angeles Kings |
| 88 | F | Andrew Mangiapane – A | 1.78 m (5 ft 10 in) | 83 kg (183 lb) | 4 April 1996 (aged 28) | (Canada) Calgary Flames |
| 91 | F | John Tavares – C | 1.83 m (6 ft 0 in) | 90 kg (200 lb) | 20 September 1990 (aged 33) | (Canada) Toronto Maple Leafs |
| 98 | F | Connor Bedard | 1.77 m (5 ft 10 in) | 84 kg (185 lb) | 17 July 2005 (aged 18) | (United States) Chicago Blackhawks |

=== Czechia ===
A 35-player roster was announced on 3 May 2024. It was reduced to 26 players two days later. On 17 May, it was announced that Martin Nečas would be added to the roster. David Pastrňák and Pavel Zacha were announced as further additions to the roster two days later. For the final match, ill Jakub Flek was replaced by Jan Ščotka.

Head coach: Radim Rulík

| No. | Pos. | Name | Height | Weight | Birthdate | Team |
|---|---|---|---|---|---|---|
| 1 | G | Lukáš Dostál | 1.85 m (6 ft 1 in) | 72 kg (159 lb) | 22 June 2000 (aged 23) | (United States) Anaheim Ducks |
| 3 | D | Radko Gudas – A | 1.83 m (6 ft 0 in) | 94 kg (207 lb) | 5 June 1990 (aged 33) | (United States) Anaheim Ducks |
| 6 | D | Michal Kempný | 1.83 m (6 ft 0 in) | 89 kg (196 lb) | 8 September 1990 (aged 33) | (Czech Republic) Sparta Praha |
| 7 | D | David Špaček | 1.83 m (6 ft 0 in) | 86 kg (190 lb) | 18 February 2003 (aged 21) | (United States) Iowa Wild |
| 8 | F | Ondřej Beránek | 1.84 m (6 ft 0 in) | 90 kg (200 lb) | 21 December 1995 (aged 28) | (Czech Republic) Karlovy Vary |
| 10 | F | Roman Červenka – C | 1.82 m (6 ft 0 in) | 89 kg (196 lb) | 10 December 1985 (aged 38) | (Switzerland) Rapperswil-Jona Lakers |
| 14 | F | Pavel Zacha | 1.91 m (6 ft 3 in) | 95 kg (209 lb) | 6 April 1997 (aged 27) | (United States) Boston Bruins |
| 18 | F | Ondřej Palát – A | 1.83 m (6 ft 0 in) | 88 kg (194 lb) | 28 March 1991 (aged 33) | (United States) New Jersey Devils |
| 19 | F | Jakub Flek | 1.73 m (5 ft 8 in) | 76 kg (168 lb) | 24 December 1992 (aged 31) | (Czech Republic) Kometa Brno |
| 22 | F | Jáchym Kondelík | 2.01 m (6 ft 7 in) | 107 kg (236 lb) | 21 December 1999 (aged 24) | (Czech Republic) Motor České Budějovice |
| 23 | F | Lukáš Sedlák | 1.84 m (6 ft 0 in) | 96 kg (212 lb) | 25 February 1993 (aged 31) | (Czech Republic) Dynamo Pardubice |
| 24 | D | Jan Ščotka | 1.87 m (6 ft 2 in) | 91 kg (201 lb) | 20 May 1996 (aged 27) | (Czech Republic) Kometa Brno |
| 34 | G | Petr Mrázek | 1.87 m (6 ft 2 in) | 84 kg (185 lb) | 14 February 1992 (aged 32) | (United States) Chicago Blackhawks |
| 36 | D | Jakub Krejčík | 1.87 m (6 ft 2 in) | 87 kg (192 lb) | 25 June 1991 (aged 32) | (Czech Republic) Sparta Praha |
| 44 | D | Jan Rutta | 1.90 m (6 ft 3 in) | 91 kg (201 lb) | 29 July 1990 (aged 33) | (United States) San Jose Sharks |
| 50 | G | Karel Vejmelka | 1.90 m (6 ft 3 in) | 90 kg (200 lb) | 25 May 1996 (aged 27) | (United States) Arizona Coyotes |
| 55 | D | Libor Hájek | 1.91 m (6 ft 3 in) | 95 kg (209 lb) | 4 February 1998 (aged 26) | (Czech Republic) Dynamo Pardubice |
| 64 | F | David Kämpf | 1.88 m (6 ft 2 in) | 86 kg (190 lb) | 12 January 1995 (aged 29) | (Canada) Toronto Maple Leafs |
| 73 | F | Ondřej Kaše | 1.82 m (6 ft 0 in) | 85 kg (187 lb) | 8 November 1995 (aged 28) | (Czech Republic) HC Litvínov |
| 81 | F | Dominik Kubalík | 1.87 m (6 ft 2 in) | 86 kg (190 lb) | 21 August 1995 (aged 28) | (Canada) Ottawa Senators |
| 84 | D | Tomáš Kundrátek | 1.88 m (6 ft 2 in) | 94 kg (207 lb) | 26 December 1989 (aged 34) | (Czech Republic) Oceláři Třinec |
| 88 | F | David Pastrňák | 1.82 m (6 ft 0 in) | 82 kg (181 lb) | 25 May 1996 (aged 27) | (United States) Boston Bruins |
| 93 | F | Matěj Stránský | 1.93 m (6 ft 4 in) | 98 kg (216 lb) | 11 July 1993 (aged 30) | (Switzerland) HC Davos |
| 95 | F | Daniel Voženílek | 1.90 m (6 ft 3 in) | 97 kg (214 lb) | 10 February 1996 (aged 28) | (Czech Republic) Oceláři Třinec |
| 96 | F | David Tomášek | 1.87 m (6 ft 2 in) | 85 kg (187 lb) | 10 February 1996 (aged 28) | (Sweden) Färjestad BK |
| 98 | F | Martin Nečas | 1.88 m (6 ft 2 in) | 90 kg (200 lb) | 15 January 1999 (aged 25) | (United States) Carolina Hurricanes |

=== Denmark ===
The roster was announced on 3 May 2024. On 6 May, Oliver Kjær left the team due to injury, and was replaced by Lucas Andersen.

Head coach: (Sweden) Mikael Gath

| No. | Pos. | Name | Height | Weight | Birthdate | Team |
|---|---|---|---|---|---|---|
| 1 | G | William Rørth | 1.77 m (5 ft 10 in) | 72 kg (159 lb) | 20 September 1999 (aged 24) | (Denmark) Rødovre Mighty Bulls |
| 5 | F | Lucas Andersen | 1.88 m (6 ft 2 in) | 80 kg (180 lb) | 30 January 1999 (aged 25) | (Denmark) Rungsted IK |
| 9 | F | Frederik Storm | 1.80 m (5 ft 11 in) | 86 kg (190 lb) | 20 February 1989 (aged 35) | (Germany) Kölner Haie |
| 11 | F | Alexander True | 1.96 m (6 ft 5 in) | 91 kg (201 lb) | 17 July 1997 (aged 26) | (United States) Charlotte Checkers |
| 12 | F | Oscar Mølgaard | 1.83 m (6 ft 0 in) | 76 kg (168 lb) | 18 February 2005 (aged 19) | (Sweden) HV71 |
| 15 | D | Matias Lassen | 1.82 m (6 ft 0 in) | 82 kg (181 lb) | 15 March 1996 (aged 28) | (Sweden) Malmö Redhawks |
| 22 | D | Markus Lauridsen | 1.86 m (6 ft 1 in) | 87 kg (192 lb) | 28 February 1991 (aged 33) | (Germany) Löwen Frankfurt |
| 25 | D | Oliver Lauridsen – A | 1.97 m (6 ft 6 in) | 93 kg (205 lb) | 24 March 1989 (aged 35) | (Finland) HC TPS |
| 29 | F | Mikkel Aagaard | 1.84 m (6 ft 0 in) | 81 kg (179 lb) | 18 October 1995 (aged 28) | (Sweden) Modo Hockey |
| 38 | F | Morten Poulsen | 1.86 m (6 ft 1 in) | 95 kg (209 lb) | 9 September 1988 (aged 35) | (Denmark) Herning Blue Fox |
| 40 | D | Anders Koch | 1.88 m (6 ft 2 in) | 83 kg (183 lb) | 2 October 1997 (aged 26) | (Denmark) Aalborg Pirates |
| 41 | D | Jesper Jensen – C | 1.83 m (6 ft 0 in) | 93 kg (205 lb) | 30 July 1991 (aged 32) | (Austria) EC KAC |
| 42 | D | Phillip Bruggisser | 2.02 m (6 ft 8 in) | 95 kg (209 lb) | 7 August 1991 (aged 32) | (Germany) Fischtown Pinguins |
| 43 | G | Mathias Seldrup | 1.80 m (5 ft 11 in) | 82 kg (181 lb) | 21 October 1996 (aged 27) | (Denmark) Esbjerg Energy |
| 47 | D | Oliver Larsen | 1.85 m (6 ft 1 in) | 94 kg (207 lb) | 25 December 1998 (aged 25) | (Finland) Mikkelin Jukurit |
| 48 | D | Nicholas Jensen | 1.89 m (6 ft 2 in) | 102 kg (225 lb) | 8 April 1989 (aged 35) | (Germany) Fischtown Pinguins |
| 54 | F | Felix Scheel | 1.83 m (6 ft 0 in) | 89 kg (196 lb) | 1 September 1992 (aged 31) | (Germany) Fischtown Pinguins |
| 63 | F | Patrick Russell – A | 1.86 m (6 ft 1 in) | 92 kg (203 lb) | 4 January 1993 (aged 31) | (Sweden) Linköping HC |
| 65 | F | Christian Wejse | 1.86 m (6 ft 1 in) | 88 kg (194 lb) | 4 December 1998 (aged 25) | (Germany) Fischtown Pinguins |
| 71 | F | Niklas Andersen | 1.80 m (5 ft 11 in) | 86 kg (190 lb) | 20 November 1997 (aged 26) | (Germany) Augsburger Panther |
| 72 | F | Phillip Schultz | 1.83 m (6 ft 0 in) | 91 kg (201 lb) | 24 July 2000 (aged 23) | (Denmark) Esbjerg Energy |
| 77 | F | Mathias From | 1.86 m (6 ft 1 in) | 85 kg (187 lb) | 16 December 1997 (aged 26) | (Denmark) Herning Blue Fox |
| 80 | G | Frederik Dichow | 1.95 m (6 ft 5 in) | 87 kg (192 lb) | 1 March 2001 (aged 23) | (Sweden) HV71 |
| 86 | F | Joachim Blichfeld | 1.87 m (6 ft 2 in) | 82 kg (181 lb) | 17 July 1998 (aged 25) | (Sweden) Växjö Lakers |
| 95 | F | Nick Olesen | 1.85 m (6 ft 1 in) | 84 kg (185 lb) | 14 November 1995 (aged 28) | (Sweden) IK Oskarshamn |

=== Finland ===
A 32-player roster was announced on 25 April 2024. A 25-player roster was then revealed on 5 May 2024, which was confirmed to be the final roster on 9 May 2024.

Head coach: Jukka Jalonen

| No. | Pos. | Name | Height | Weight | Birthdate | Team |
|---|---|---|---|---|---|---|
| 2 | D | Rasmus Rissanen | 1.91 m (6 ft 3 in) | 98 kg (216 lb) | 13 July 1991 (aged 32) | (Sweden) Örebro HK |
| 3 | D | Olli Määttä – A | 1.87 m (6 ft 2 in) | 89 kg (196 lb) | 22 August 1994 (aged 29) | (United States) Detroit Red Wings |
| 4 | D | Mikko Lehtonen – A | 1.83 m (6 ft 0 in) | 89 kg (196 lb) | 16 January 1994 (aged 30) | (Switzerland) ZSC Lions |
| 7 | D | Oliwer Kaski | 1.90 m (6 ft 3 in) | 89 kg (196 lb) | 4 September 1995 (aged 28) | (Sweden) HV71 |
| 12 | F | Jere Innala | 1.75 m (5 ft 9 in) | 83 kg (183 lb) | 17 March 1998 (aged 26) | (Sweden) Frölunda HC |
| 13 | F | Jesse Puljujärvi | 1.92 m (6 ft 4 in) | 93 kg (205 lb) | 7 May 1998 (aged 26) | (United States) Pittsburgh Penguins |
| 15 | F | Juha Jääskä | 1.84 m (6 ft 0 in) | 89 kg (196 lb) | 9 February 1998 (aged 26) | (Finland) HIFK Helsinki |
| 18 | D | Vili Saarijärvi | 1.79 m (5 ft 10 in) | 78 kg (172 lb) | 15 May 1997 (aged 26) | (Switzerland) SCL Tigers |
| 19 | F | Konsta Helenius | 1.80 m (5 ft 11 in) | 82 kg (181 lb) | 11 May 2006 (aged 17) | (Finland) Mikkelin Jukurit |
| 21 | F | Patrik Puistola | 1.83 m (6 ft 0 in) | 82 kg (181 lb) | 11 January 2001 (aged 23) | (Finland) Mikkelin Jukurit |
| 24 | F | Hannes Björninen | 1.85 m (6 ft 1 in) | 91 kg (201 lb) | 19 October 1995 (aged 28) | (Sweden) Örebro HK |
| 25 | F | Pekka Jormakka | 1.74 m (5 ft 9 in) | 80 kg (180 lb) | 14 September 1990 (aged 33) | (Finland) Mikkelin Jukurit |
| 27 | F | Oliver Kapanen | 1.86 m (6 ft 1 in) | 81 kg (179 lb) | 29 July 2003 (aged 20) | (Finland) KalPa |
| 29 | G | Harri Säteri | 1.86 m (6 ft 1 in) | 90 kg (200 lb) | 29 December 1989 (aged 34) | (Switzerland) EHC Biel |
| 30 | G | Lassi Lehtinen | 1.83 m (6 ft 0 in) | 80 kg (180 lb) | 25 February 1999 (aged 25) | (Sweden) MoDo Hockey |
| 33 | G | Emil Larmi | 1.82 m (6 ft 0 in) | 84 kg (185 lb) | 28 September 1996 (aged 27) | (Sweden) Växjö Lakers |
| 38 | D | Veli-Matti Vittasmäki | 1.85 m (6 ft 1 in) | 87 kg (192 lb) | 3 July 1990 (aged 33) | (Finland) Tappara |
| 48 | F | Valtteri Puustinen | 1.76 m (5 ft 9 in) | 83 kg (183 lb) | 4 June 1999 (aged 24) | (United States) Pittsburgh Penguins |
| 50 | D | Juuso Riikola | 1.84 m (6 ft 0 in) | 86 kg (190 lb) | 9 November 1993 (aged 30) | (Switzerland) SCL Tigers |
| 57 | F | Arttu Hyry | 1.87 m (6 ft 2 in) | 97 kg (214 lb) | 6 April 2001 (aged 23) | (Finland) Oulun Kärpät |
| 62 | D | Jesper Mattila | 1.80 m (5 ft 11 in) | 80 kg (180 lb) | 9 October 1997 (aged 26) | (Finland) KalPa Kuopio |
| 64 | F | Mikael Granlund – C | 1.79 m (5 ft 10 in) | 84 kg (185 lb) | 26 February 1992 (aged 32) | (United States) San Jose Sharks |
| 71 | F | Ahti Oksanen | 1.92 m (6 ft 4 in) | 98 kg (216 lb) | 10 March 1993 (aged 31) | (Sweden) IK Oskarshamn |
| 80 | F | Saku Mäenalanen | 1.92 m (6 ft 4 in) | 94 kg (207 lb) | 29 May 1994 (aged 29) | (Switzerland) SCL Tigers |
| 81 | F | Iiro Pakarinen | 1.85 m (6 ft 1 in) | 90 kg (200 lb) | 25 August 1991 (aged 32) | (Finland) HIFK Helsinki |

=== Great Britain ===
The roster was announced on 3 May 2024.

Head coach: Peter Russell

| No. | Pos. | Name | Height | Weight | Birthdate | Team |
|---|---|---|---|---|---|---|
| 1 | G | Jackson Whistle | 1.85 m (6 ft 1 in) | 87 kg (192 lb) | 9 June 1995 (aged 28) | (United Kingdom) Belfast Giants |
| 2 | D | Sam Ruopp | 1.93 m (6 ft 4 in) | 95 kg (209 lb) | 3 June 1996 (aged 27) | (Germany) Lausitzer Füchse |
| 5 | F | Ben Davies | 1.73 m (5 ft 8 in) | 81 kg (179 lb) | 18 January 1991 (aged 33) | (United Kingdom) Cardiff Devils |
| 7 | F | Robert Lachowicz | 1.78 m (5 ft 10 in) | 80 kg (180 lb) | 8 February 1990 (aged 34) | (United Kingdom) Glasgow Clan |
| 9 | F | Brett Perlini | 1.88 m (6 ft 2 in) | 91 kg (201 lb) | 14 June 1990 (aged 33) | (Germany) Saale Bulls |
| 11 | F | Cam Critchlow | 1.75 m (5 ft 9 in) | 86 kg (190 lb) | 18 December 1991 (aged 32) | (United Kingdom) Manchester Storm |
| 13 | D | David Phillips | 1.91 m (6 ft 3 in) | 88 kg (194 lb) | 14 August 1987 (aged 36) | (United Kingdom) Belfast Giants |
| 14 | F | Liam Kirk – A | 1.82 m (6 ft 0 in) | 72 kg (159 lb) | 3 January 2000 (aged 24) | (Czech Republic) HC Litvínov |
| 16 | F | Sam Duggan | 1.85 m (6 ft 1 in) | 90 kg (200 lb) | 13 July 1998 (aged 25) | (United Kingdom) Cardiff Devils |
| 17 | D | Mark Richardson – A | 1.83 m (6 ft 0 in) | 88 kg (194 lb) | 3 October 1986 (aged 37) | (United Kingdom) Cardiff Devils |
| 23 | F | Sean Norris | 1.78 m (5 ft 10 in) | 75 kg (165 lb) | 14 September 1999 (aged 24) | (United Kingdom) Belfast Giants |
| 24 | D | Josh Tetlow | 1.98 m (6 ft 6 in) | 103 kg (227 lb) | 12 January 1998 (aged 26) | (United Kingdom) Nottingham Panthers |
| 26 | D | Evan Mosey | 1.80 m (5 ft 11 in) | 84 kg (185 lb) | 17 March 1989 (aged 35) | (United Kingdom) Cardiff Devils |
| 27 | F | Cole Shudra | 1.88 m (6 ft 2 in) | 95 kg (209 lb) | 11 August 1998 (aged 25) | (United Kingdom) Sheffield Steelers |
| 28 | D | Ben O'Connor | 1.85 m (6 ft 1 in) | 85 kg (187 lb) | 21 December 1988 (aged 35) | (United Kingdom) Guildford Flames |
| 33 | G | Ben Bowns | 1.83 m (6 ft 0 in) | 81 kg (179 lb) | 21 January 1991 (aged 33) | (United Kingdom) Cardiff Devils |
| 35 | G | Lucas Brine | 1.85 m (6 ft 1 in) | 77 kg (170 lb) | 9 August 2002 (aged 21) | (United Kingdom) Dundee Stars |
| 41 | D | Josh Batch | 1.93 m (6 ft 4 in) | 100 kg (220 lb) | 15 January 1991 (aged 33) | (United Kingdom) Cardiff Devils |
| 44 | D | Sam Jones | 1.88 m (6 ft 2 in) | 86 kg (190 lb) | 11 November 1997 (aged 26) | (United Kingdom) Sheffield Steelers |
| 48 | F | Johnny Curran | 1.78 m (5 ft 10 in) | 79 kg (174 lb) | 14 March 1995 (aged 29) | (United Kingdom) Coventry Blaze |
| 74 | F | Ollie Betteridge | 1.80 m (5 ft 11 in) | 80 kg (180 lb) | 16 January 1996 (aged 28) | (United Kingdom) Nottingham Panthers |
| 75 | F | Robert Dowd – C | 1.78 m (5 ft 10 in) | 80 kg (180 lb) | 26 May 1988 (aged 35) | (United Kingdom) Sheffield Steelers |
| 79 | D | Nathanael Halbert | 1.83 m (6 ft 0 in) | 88 kg (194 lb) | 30 September 1995 (aged 28) | (Austria) HC Innsbruck |
| 91 | F | Ben Lake | 1.80 m (5 ft 11 in) | 77 kg (170 lb) | 31 May 1990 (aged 33) | (United Kingdom) Belfast Giants |
| 94 | F | Cade Neilson | 1.83 m (6 ft 0 in) | 88 kg (194 lb) | 15 May 2001 (aged 22) | (United States) Alaska Nanooks |

=== Norway ===
A 27-player roster was announced on 6 May 2024, with two of the players not yet available as they were still participating in the Calder Cup playoffs.

Head coach: (Sweden) Tobias Johansson

| No. | Pos. | Name | Height | Weight | Birthdate | Team |
|---|---|---|---|---|---|---|
| 2 | D | Isak Hansen | 1.89 m (6 ft 2 in) | 93 kg (205 lb) | 2 October 2003 (aged 20) | (Norway) Sparta Sarpsborg |
| 4 | D | Johannes Johannesen | 1.81 m (5 ft 11 in) | 85 kg (187 lb) | 1 March 1997 (aged 27) | (Finland) Lahti Pelicans |
| 7 | D | Sander Vold Engebråten | 1.82 m (6 ft 0 in) | 82 kg (181 lb) | 7 July 2002 (aged 21) | (Finland) Mikkelin Jukurit |
| 8 | F | Mathias Trettenes | 1.80 m (5 ft 11 in) | 82 kg (181 lb) | 8 November 1993 (aged 30) | (Norway) Stavanger Oilers |
| 10 | D | Mattias Nørstebø – A | 1.78 m (5 ft 10 in) | 80 kg (180 lb) | 3 June 1995 (aged 28) | (Sweden) IF Björklöven |
| 12 | F | Noah Steen | 1.85 m (6 ft 1 in) | 86 kg (190 lb) | 16 August 2004 (aged 19) | (Sweden) Mora IK |
| 13 | F | Petter Vesterheim | 1.81 m (5 ft 11 in) | 78 kg (172 lb) | 30 September 2004 (aged 19) | (Sweden) Mora IK |
| 17 | F | Eirik Salsten | 1.85 m (6 ft 1 in) | 88 kg (194 lb) | 17 June 1994 (aged 29) | (Norway) Storhamar Hockey |
| 18 | F | Thomas Olsen | 1.86 m (6 ft 1 in) | 92 kg (203 lb) | 25 June 1995 (aged 28) | (Norway) Vålerenga Ishockey |
| 19 | F | Håvard Salsten | 1.88 m (6 ft 2 in) | 90 kg (200 lb) | 19 August 2000 (aged 23) | (Norway) Sparta Sarpsborg |
| 20 | F | Mathias Emilio Pettersen | 1.80 m (5 ft 11 in) | 82 kg (181 lb) | 3 April 2000 (aged 24) | (United States) Texas Stars |
| 22 | F | Martin Rønnild | 1.86 m (6 ft 1 in) | 95 kg (209 lb) | 24 January 1996 (aged 28) | (Norway) Storhamar Hockey |
| 23 | F | Thomas Berg Paulsen – A | 1.86 m (6 ft 1 in) | 85 kg (187 lb) | 6 August 1999 (aged 24) | (Sweden) Malmö Redhawks |
| 27 | F | Andreas Martinsen | 1.90 m (6 ft 3 in) | 105 kg (231 lb) | 13 June 1990 (aged 33) | (Norway) Storhamar Hockey |
| 28 | F | Michael Brandsegg-Nygård | 1.86 m (6 ft 1 in) | 93 kg (205 lb) | 5 October 2005 (aged 18) | (Sweden) Mora IK |
| 30 | G | Tobias Normann | 1.86 m (6 ft 1 in) | 85 kg (187 lb) | 3 August 2001 (aged 22) | (Sweden) AIK IF |
| 31 | G | Jonas Arntzen | 1.93 m (6 ft 4 in) | 90 kg (200 lb) | 21 November 1997 (aged 26) | (Sweden) Örebro HK |
| 33 | G | Henrik Haukeland | 1.88 m (6 ft 2 in) | 93 kg (205 lb) | 6 December 1994 (aged 29) | (Germany) Düsseldorfer EG |
| 36 | F | Mats Zuccarello | 1.71 m (5 ft 7 in) | 74 kg (163 lb) | 1 September 1987 (aged 36) | (United States) Minnesota Wild |
| 37 | F | Markus Vikingstad | 1.94 m (6 ft 4 in) | 96 kg (212 lb) | 27 September 1999 (aged 24) | (Germany) Fischtown Pinguins |
| 41 | F | Patrick Thoresen – C | 1.80 m (5 ft 11 in) | 93 kg (205 lb) | 7 November 1983 (aged 40) | (Norway) Storhamar Hockey |
| 43 | D | Max Krogdahl | 1.88 m (6 ft 2 in) | 93 kg (205 lb) | 21 October 1998 (aged 25) | (Sweden) Östersunds IK |
| 49 | D | Christian Kåsastul | 1.78 m (5 ft 10 in) | 86 kg (190 lb) | 9 April 1997 (aged 27) | (Italy) Pustertal Wölfe |
| 54 | D | Sander Hurrød | 1.85 m (6 ft 1 in) | 85 kg (187 lb) | 2 April 2000 (aged 24) | (Norway) Storhamar Hockey |
| 71 | F | Eskild Bakke Olsen | 1.87 m (6 ft 2 in) | 93 kg (205 lb) | 19 March 2002 (aged 22) | (Sweden) BIK Karlskoga |
| 72 | D | Stian Solberg | 1.89 m (6 ft 2 in) | 92 kg (203 lb) | 29 December 2005 (aged 18) | (Norway) Vålerenga Ishockey |

=== Switzerland ===
A preliminary 24-player roster was announced on 6 May 2024. On 8 May, Roman Josi was added to the roster. On 11 May, it was announced that Kevin Fiala would join the team.

Head coach: Patrick Fischer

| No. | Pos. | Name | Height | Weight | Birthdate | Team |
|---|---|---|---|---|---|---|
| 10 | F | Andres Ambühl | 1.76 m (5 ft 9 in) | 86 kg (190 lb) | 14 September 1983 (aged 40) | (Switzerland) HC Davos |
| 11 | F | Sven Senteler | 1.85 m (6 ft 1 in) | 88 kg (194 lb) | 11 August 1992 (aged 31) | (Switzerland) EV Zug |
| 13 | F | Nico Hischier – A | 1.86 m (6 ft 1 in) | 79 kg (174 lb) | 4 January 1999 (aged 25) | (United States) New Jersey Devils |
| 14 | D | Dean Kukan | 1.87 m (6 ft 2 in) | 87 kg (192 lb) | 8 July 1993 (aged 30) | (Switzerland) ZSC Lions |
| 17 | F | Ken Jäger | 1.86 m (6 ft 1 in) | 83 kg (183 lb) | 30 May 1998 (aged 25) | (Switzerland) Lausanne HC |
| 18 | D | Sven Jung | 1.87 m (6 ft 2 in) | 86 kg (190 lb) | 5 January 1995 (aged 29) | (Switzerland) HC Davos |
| 20 | G | Reto Berra | 1.94 m (6 ft 4 in) | 99 kg (218 lb) | 3 January 1987 (aged 37) | (Switzerland) HC Fribourg-Gottéron |
| 21 | F | Kevin Fiala | 1.78 m (5 ft 10 in) | 93 kg (205 lb) | 22 July 1996 (aged 27) | (United States) Los Angeles Kings |
| 22 | F | Nino Niederreiter – A | 1.88 m (6 ft 2 in) | 99 kg (218 lb) | 8 September 1992 (aged 31) | (Canada) Winnipeg Jets |
| 23 | F | Philipp Kurashev | 1.83 m (6 ft 0 in) | 86 kg (190 lb) | 12 October 1999 (aged 24) | (United States) Chicago Blackhawks |
| 40 | G | Akira Schmid | 1.95 m (6 ft 5 in) | 93 kg (205 lb) | 12 May 2000 (aged 23) | (United States) New Jersey Devils |
| 43 | D | Andrea Glauser | 1.82 m (6 ft 0 in) | 86 kg (190 lb) | 3 April 1996 (aged 28) | (Switzerland) Lausanne HC |
| 45 | D | Michael Fora | 1.92 m (6 ft 4 in) | 98 kg (216 lb) | 30 October 1995 (aged 28) | (Switzerland) HC Davos |
| 54 | D | Christian Marti | 1.90 m (6 ft 3 in) | 96 kg (212 lb) | 29 March 1993 (aged 31) | (Switzerland) ZSC Lions |
| 55 | D | Romain Loeffel | 1.78 m (5 ft 10 in) | 85 kg (187 lb) | 10 March 1991 (aged 33) | (Switzerland) SC Bern |
| 59 | F | Dario Simion | 1.88 m (6 ft 2 in) | 88 kg (194 lb) | 22 May 1994 (aged 29) | (Switzerland) EV Zug |
| 60 | F | Tristan Scherwey | 1.78 m (5 ft 10 in) | 86 kg (190 lb) | 7 May 1991 (aged 33) | (Switzerland) SC Bern |
| 63 | G | Leonardo Genoni | 1.83 m (6 ft 0 in) | 83 kg (183 lb) | 28 August 1987 (aged 36) | (Switzerland) EV Zug |
| 68 | F | Fabrice Herzog | 1.90 m (6 ft 3 in) | 90 kg (200 lb) | 9 December 1994 (aged 29) | (Switzerland) EV Zug |
| 79 | F | Calvin Thürkauf | 1.88 m (6 ft 2 in) | 96 kg (212 lb) | 27 June 1997 (aged 26) | (Switzerland) HC Lugano |
| 85 | F | Sven Andrighetto | 1.77 m (5 ft 10 in) | 85 kg (187 lb) | 21 March 1993 (aged 31) | (Switzerland) ZSC Lions |
| 88 | F | Christoph Bertschy | 1.77 m (5 ft 10 in) | 84 kg (185 lb) | 5 April 1994 (aged 30) | (Switzerland) HC Fribourg-Gottéron |
| 90 | D | Roman Josi – C | 1.87 m (6 ft 2 in) | 91 kg (201 lb) | 1 June 1990 (aged 33) | (United States) Nashville Predators |
| 92 | F | Gaëtan Haas | 1.83 m (6 ft 0 in) | 82 kg (181 lb) | 31 January 1992 (aged 32) | (Switzerland) EHC Biel |
| 97 | D | Jonas Siegenthaler | 1.89 m (6 ft 2 in) | 99 kg (218 lb) | 6 May 1997 (aged 27) | (United States) New Jersey Devils |

== Group B ==
=== France ===
A 26-player roster was announced on 29 April 2024. The final squad was revealed on 7 May. On 12 May, Nicolas Ritz was replaced by Justin Addamo due to injury. On 18 May, Robin Colomban was called up as an injury replacement for Stéphane Da Costa.

Head coach: Philippe Bozon

| No. | Pos. | Name | Height | Weight | Birthdate | Team |
|---|---|---|---|---|---|---|
| 3 | F | Charles Bertrand | 1.85 m (6 ft 1 in) | 92 kg (203 lb) | 5 February 1991 (aged 33) | (Germany) ERC Ingolstadt |
| 5 | D | Enzo Guebey | 1.83 m (6 ft 0 in) | 88 kg (194 lb) | 6 May 1999 (aged 25) | (Switzerland) HC Davos |
| 6 | D | Vincent Llorca | 1.92 m (6 ft 4 in) | 92 kg (203 lb) | 16 January 1992 (aged 32) | (France) Ducs d'Angers |
| 7 | D | Pierre Crinon | 1.95 m (6 ft 5 in) | 102 kg (225 lb) | 2 August 1995 (aged 28) | (France) Brûleurs de Loups |
| 8 | D | Hugo Gallet | 1.92 m (6 ft 4 in) | 93 kg (205 lb) | 20 June 1997 (aged 26) | (Finland) KalPa |
| 11 | F | Robin Colomban | 1.89 m (6 ft 2 in) | 89 kg (196 lb) | 18 November 1997 (aged 26) | (France) Diables Rouges de Briançon |
| 12 | F | Valentin Claireaux | 1.80 m (5 ft 11 in) | 87 kg (192 lb) | 5 April 1994 (aged 30) | (Czech Republic) Vítkovice Ridera |
| 14 | F | Stéphane Da Costa – A | 1.81 m (5 ft 11 in) | 82 kg (181 lb) | 11 July 1989 (aged 34) | (Russia) Avtomobilist Yekaterinburg |
| 18 | D | Yohann Auvitu | 1.82 m (6 ft 0 in) | 88 kg (194 lb) | 27 July 1989 (aged 34) | (Czech Republic) Vítkovice Ridera |
| 24 | F | Justin Addamo | 1.98 m (6 ft 6 in) | 112 kg (247 lb) | 27 May 1998 (aged 25) | (United States) Wilkes-Barre/Scranton Penguins |
| 25 | D | Nicolas Ritz | 1.80 m (5 ft 11 in) | 88 kg (194 lb) | 26 February 1992 (aged 32) | (France) Ducs d'Angers |
| 27 | D | Enzo Cantagallo | 1.80 m (5 ft 11 in) | 85 kg (187 lb) | 19 October 1998 (aged 25) | (France) Dragons de Rouen |
| 29 | F | Louis Boudon | 1.80 m (5 ft 11 in) | 85 kg (187 lb) | 4 October 1998 (aged 25) | (United States) Iowa Heartlanders |
| 32 | G | Quentin Papillon | 1.77 m (5 ft 10 in) | 81 kg (179 lb) | 7 April 1997 (aged 27) | (France) Boxers de Bordeaux |
| 33 | G | Julian Junca | 1.95 m (6 ft 5 in) | 97 kg (214 lb) | 15 February 1998 (aged 26) | (United States) Chicago Wolves |
| 37 | G | Sebastian Ylönen | 1.86 m (6 ft 1 in) | 78 kg (172 lb) | 3 July 1991 (aged 32) | (France) Jokers de Cergy-Pontoise |
| 41 | F | Pierre-Édouard Bellemare – A | 1.82 m (6 ft 0 in) | 89 kg (196 lb) | 6 March 1985 (aged 39) | (United States) Seattle Kraken |
| 44 | F | Tomas Simonsen | 1.75 m (5 ft 9 in) | 84 kg (185 lb) | 20 October 2002 (aged 21) | (France) Gothiques d'Amiens |
| 62 | D | Florian Chakiachvili | 1.86 m (6 ft 1 in) | 86 kg (190 lb) | 18 March 1992 (aged 32) | (France) Dragons de Rouen |
| 72 | F | Jordann Perret | 1.79 m (5 ft 10 in) | 81 kg (179 lb) | 15 October 1994 (aged 29) | (Czech Republic) Mountfield HK |
| 74 | D | Thomas Thiry | 1.91 m (6 ft 3 in) | 105 kg (231 lb) | 9 September 1997 (aged 26) | (Switzerland) HC Ajoie |
| 77 | F | Sacha Treille – C | 1.94 m (6 ft 4 in) | 97 kg (214 lb) | 6 November 1987 (aged 36) | (France) Brûleurs de Loups |
| 81 | F | Anthony Rech | 1.80 m (5 ft 11 in) | 86 kg (190 lb) | 9 July 1992 (aged 31) | (France) Dragons de Rouen |
| 90 | F | Aurélien Dair | 1.87 m (6 ft 2 in) | 84 kg (185 lb) | 10 September 1999 (aged 24) | (France) Brûleurs de Loups |
| 91 | F | Baptiste Bruche | 1.83 m (6 ft 0 in) | 95 kg (209 lb) | 27 January 2000 (aged 24) | (France) Boxers de Bordeaux |
| 94 | F | Tim Bozon | 1.86 m (6 ft 1 in) | 92 kg (203 lb) | 24 March 1994 (aged 30) | (Switzerland) Lausanne HC |
| 95 | F | Kévin Bozon | 1.87 m (6 ft 2 in) | 90 kg (200 lb) | 30 December 1995 (aged 28) | (Switzerland) HC Ajoie |

=== Germany ===
A 28-player roster was announced on 30 April 2024.

Head coach: Harold Kreis

| No. | Pos. | Name | Height | Weight | Birthdate | Team |
|---|---|---|---|---|---|---|
| 5 | D | Tobias Fohrler | 1.95 m (6 ft 5 in) | 102 kg (225 lb) | 6 September 1997 (aged 26) | (Switzerland) HC Ambrì-Piotta |
| 6 | D | Kai Wissmann | 1.90 m (6 ft 3 in) | 88 kg (194 lb) | 22 October 1996 (aged 27) | (Germany) Eisbären Berlin |
| 7 | F | Maximilian Kastner | 1.80 m (5 ft 11 in) | 84 kg (185 lb) | 3 January 1993 (aged 31) | (Germany) Red Bull München |
| 17 | F | Tobias Eder | 1.83 m (6 ft 0 in) | 81 kg (179 lb) | 4 March 1998 (aged 26) | (Germany) Eisbären Berlin |
| 19 | F | Wojciech Stachowiak | 1.85 m (6 ft 1 in) | 85 kg (187 lb) | 3 July 1999 (aged 24) | (Germany) ERC Ingolstadt |
| 27 | D | Maksymilian Szuber | 1.91 m (6 ft 3 in) | 92 kg (203 lb) | 25 August 2002 (aged 21) | (United States) Arizona Coyotes |
| 30 | G | Philipp Grubauer | 1.85 m (6 ft 1 in) | 84 kg (185 lb) | 25 November 1991 (aged 32) | (United States) Seattle Kraken |
| 33 | F | JJ Peterka | 1.80 m (5 ft 11 in) | 85 kg (187 lb) | 14 January 2002 (aged 22) | (United States) Buffalo Sabres |
| 35 | G | Mathias Niederberger | 1.80 m (5 ft 11 in) | 80 kg (180 lb) | 26 November 1992 (aged 31) | (Germany) Red Bull München |
| 38 | D | Fabio Wagner | 1.82 m (6 ft 0 in) | 83 kg (183 lb) | 17 September 1995 (aged 28) | (Germany) ERC Ingolstadt |
| 40 | F | Alexander Ehl | 1.75 m (5 ft 9 in) | 76 kg (168 lb) | 28 November 1999 (aged 24) | (Germany) Düsseldorfer EG |
| 41 | D | Jonas Müller | 1.83 m (6 ft 0 in) | 88 kg (194 lb) | 19 November 1995 (aged 28) | (Germany) Eisbären Berlin |
| 42 | F | Yasin Ehliz – A | 1.77 m (5 ft 10 in) | 84 kg (185 lb) | 30 December 1992 (aged 31) | (Germany) Red Bull München |
| 45 | G | Tobias Ančička | 1.86 m (6 ft 1 in) | 82 kg (181 lb) | 27 February 2001 (aged 23) | (Germany) Kölner Haie |
| 49 | D | Lukas Kälble | 1.88 m (6 ft 2 in) | 93 kg (205 lb) | 13 October 1997 (aged 26) | (Germany) Adler Mannheim |
| 62 | F | Parker Tuomie | 1.76 m (5 ft 9 in) | 77 kg (170 lb) | 31 October 1995 (aged 28) | (Germany) Kölner Haie |
| 65 | F | Marc Michaelis | 1.77 m (5 ft 10 in) | 79 kg (174 lb) | 31 July 1995 (aged 28) | (Germany) Adler Mannheim |
| 72 | F | Dominik Kahun – A | 1.80 m (5 ft 11 in) | 79 kg (174 lb) | 2 July 1995 (aged 28) | (Switzerland) SC Bern |
| 73 | F | Lukas Reichel | 1.83 m (6 ft 0 in) | 78 kg (172 lb) | 17 May 2002 (aged 21) | (United States) Chicago Blackhawks |
| 77 | F | Daniel Fischbuch | 1.80 m (5 ft 11 in) | 80 kg (180 lb) | 19 August 1993 (aged 30) | (Germany) Adler Mannheim |
| 78 | F | Nico Sturm | 1.89 m (6 ft 2 in) | 85 kg (187 lb) | 3 May 1995 (aged 29) | (United States) San Jose Sharks |
| 79 | F | Colin Ugbelike | 1.86 m (6 ft 1 in) | 88 kg (194 lb) | 24 September 1999 (aged 24) | (Germany) Iserlohn Roosters |
| 83 | F | Leonhard Pföderl | 1.82 m (6 ft 0 in) | 87 kg (192 lb) | 1 September 1993 (aged 30) | (Germany) Eisbären Berlin |
| 91 | D | Moritz Müller – C | 1.87 m (6 ft 2 in) | 92 kg (203 lb) | 19 November 1986 (aged 37) | (Germany) Kölner Haie |
| 95 | F | Frederik Tiffels | 1.83 m (6 ft 0 in) | 87 kg (192 lb) | 20 May 1995 (aged 28) | (Germany) Eisbären Berlin |

=== Kazakhstan ===
Head coach: Galym Mambetaliev

| No. | Pos. | Name | Height | Weight | Birthdate | Team |
|---|---|---|---|---|---|---|
| 1 | G | Nikita Boyarkin | 1.90 m (6 ft 3 in) | 96 kg (212 lb) | 7 October 1998 (aged 25) | (Kazakhstan) Barys Astana |
| 5 | F | Oleg Boiko | 1.77 m (5 ft 10 in) | 77 kg (170 lb) | 29 May 2001 (aged 22) | (Kazakhstan) Nomad Astana |
| 7 | D | Leonid Metalnikov | 1.82 m (6 ft 0 in) | 85 kg (187 lb) | 25 April 1990 (aged 34) | (Russia) Admiral Vladivostok |
| 10 | F | Nikita Mikhailis – A | 1.75 m (5 ft 9 in) | 70 kg (150 lb) | 18 June 1995 (aged 28) | (Russia) Metallurg Magnitogorsk |
| 17 | F | Alikhan Omirbekov | 1.75 m (5 ft 9 in) | 67 kg (148 lb) | 14 June 2001 (aged 22) | (Kazakhstan) Nomad Astana |
| 22 | F | Kirill Panyukov | 1.85 m (6 ft 1 in) | 82 kg (181 lb) | 22 May 1997 (aged 26) | (Russia) Amur Khabarovsk |
| 23 | F | Maxim Mukhametov | 1.82 m (6 ft 0 in) | 80 kg (180 lb) | 30 April 1999 (aged 25) | (Russia) Metallurg Magnitogorsk |
| 24 | D | Dmitriy Breus | 1.85 m (6 ft 1 in) | 88 kg (194 lb) | 22 February 2004 (aged 20) | (Russia) Chaika Nizhny Novgorod |
| 28 | D | Valeri Orekhov | 1.86 m (6 ft 1 in) | 76 kg (168 lb) | 17 July 1999 (aged 24) | (Russia) Metallurg Magnitogorsk |
| 29 | F | Maxim Musorov | 1.82 m (6 ft 0 in) | 84 kg (185 lb) | 29 May 2001 (aged 22) | (Kazakhstan) Nomad Astana |
| 31 | D | Artyom Korolyov | 1.85 m (6 ft 1 in) | 74 kg (163 lb) | 20 September 2001 (aged 22) | (Kazakhstan) Nomad Astana |
| 32 | D | Sergei Kudryavtsev | 1.88 m (6 ft 2 in) | 90 kg (200 lb) | 5 April 1995 (aged 29) | (Kazakhstan) Arlan Kokshetau |
| 43 | G | Andrei Shutov | 1.89 m (6 ft 2 in) | 83 kg (183 lb) | 4 March 1998 (aged 26) | (Kazakhstan) Barys Astana |
| 48 | F | Roman Starchenko – C | 1.79 m (5 ft 10 in) | 88 kg (194 lb) | 12 May 1986 (aged 37) | (Kazakhstan) Barys Astana |
| 58 | D | Tamirlan Gaitamirov | 1.93 m (6 ft 4 in) | 93 kg (205 lb) | 23 August 2000 (aged 23) | (Kazakhstan) Barys Astana |
| 64 | F | Arkadiy Shestakov | 1.82 m (6 ft 0 in) | 83 kg (183 lb) | 24 March 1995 (aged 29) | (Kazakhstan) Barys Astana |
| 65 | D | Samat Daniyar – A | 1.83 m (6 ft 0 in) | 73 kg (161 lb) | 24 January 1999 (aged 25) | (Kazakhstan) Barys Astana |
| 66 | F | Nikolay Shulga | 1.78 m (5 ft 10 in) | 75 kg (165 lb) | 11 February 2003 (aged 21) | (Kazakhstan) Nomad Astana |
| 71 | D | Madi Dikhanbek | 1.79 m (5 ft 10 in) | 71 kg (157 lb) | 21 January 2001 (aged 23) | (Kazakhstan) Nomad Astana |
| 79 | F | Mikhail Rakhmanov | 1.76 m (5 ft 9 in) | 77 kg (170 lb) | 27 March 1992 (aged 32) | (Kazakhstan) Barys Astana |
| 81 | F | Batyrlan Muratov | 1.83 m (6 ft 0 in) | 72 kg (159 lb) | 1 February 1999 (aged 25) | (Kazakhstan) Barys Astana |
| 84 | F | Kirill Savitski | 1.83 m (6 ft 0 in) | 87 kg (192 lb) | 9 March 1995 (aged 29) | (Kazakhstan) Barys Astana |
| 87 | D | Adil Beketayev | 1.93 m (6 ft 4 in) | 93 kg (205 lb) | 23 April 1998 (aged 26) | (Kazakhstan) Barys Astana |
| 88 | F | Evgeni Rymarev | 1.75 m (5 ft 9 in) | 78 kg (172 lb) | 9 November 1988 (aged 35) | (Kazakhstan) Barys Astana |
| 92 | F | Dmitri Grents | 1.83 m (6 ft 0 in) | 84 kg (185 lb) | 10 June 1996 (aged 27) | (Kazakhstan) Arlan Kokshetau |
| 96 | F | Alikhan Asetov | 1.96 m (6 ft 5 in) | 91 kg (201 lb) | 26 August 1988 (aged 35) | (Kazakhstan) Barys Astana |

=== Latvia ===
A 27-player roster was announced on 25 April 2024. The final squad was revealed on 7 May.

Head coach: Harijs Vītoliņš

| No. | Pos. | Name | Height | Weight | Birthdate | Team |
|---|---|---|---|---|---|---|
| 2 | D | Kārlis Čukste | 1.88 m (6 ft 2 in) | 98 kg (216 lb) | 17 June 1997 (aged 26) | (Sweden) Brynäs IF |
| 6 | D | Markuss Komuls | 1.80 m (5 ft 11 in) | 84 kg (185 lb) | 4 January 1998 (aged 26) | (Canada) Trois-Rivières Lions |
| 9 | F | Renārs Krastenbergs | 1.83 m (6 ft 0 in) | 84 kg (185 lb) | 26 December 1998 (aged 25) | (Austria) Graz 99ers |
| 13 | F | Rihards Bukarts | 1.80 m (5 ft 11 in) | 84 kg (185 lb) | 31 December 1995 (aged 28) | (Czech Republic) Vítkovice Ridera |
| 16 | F | Kaspars Daugaviņš – C | 1.83 m (6 ft 0 in) | 101 kg (223 lb) | 18 May 1988 (aged 35) | (Slovakia) HK Dukla Michalovce |
| 17 | F | Mārtiņš Dzierkals | 1.83 m (6 ft 0 in) | 84 kg (185 lb) | 4 April 1997 (aged 27) | (Sweden) Skellefteå AIK |
| 18 | F | Rodrigo Ābols – A | 1.93 m (6 ft 4 in) | 93 kg (205 lb) | 5 January 1996 (aged 28) | (Sweden) Rögle BK |
| 20 | F | Raivis Ansons | 1.86 m (6 ft 1 in) | 84 kg (185 lb) | 29 January 2002 (aged 22) | (United States) Wilkes-Barre/Scranton Penguins |
| 27 | D | Oskars Cibuļskis | 1.88 m (6 ft 2 in) | 96 kg (212 lb) | 9 April 1988 (aged 36) | (Denmark) Herning Blue Fox |
| 29 | D | Ralfs Freibergs | 1.81 m (5 ft 11 in) | 84 kg (185 lb) | 17 May 1991 (aged 32) | (Czech Republic) Mountfield HK |
| 30 | G | Elvis Merzļikins | 1.91 m (6 ft 3 in) | 87 kg (192 lb) | 13 April 1994 (aged 30) | (United States) Columbus Blue Jackets |
| 34 | F | Eduards Tralmaks | 1.91 m (6 ft 3 in) | 85 kg (187 lb) | 17 February 1997 (aged 27) | (Czech Republic) Rytíři Kladno |
| 35 | G | Ēriks Vītols | 1.85 m (6 ft 1 in) | 84 kg (185 lb) | 17 July 2001 (aged 22) | (Finland) JYP Jyväskylä |
| 36 | F | Martins Laviņš | 1.83 m (6 ft 0 in) | 80 kg (180 lb) | 10 April 2003 (aged 21) | (United States) New Hampshire Wildcats |
| 50 | G | Kristers Gudļevskis | 1.92 m (6 ft 4 in) | 97 kg (214 lb) | 31 July 1992 (aged 31) | (Germany) Fischtown Pinguins |
| 55 | D | Roberts Mamčics | 1.96 m (6 ft 5 in) | 105 kg (231 lb) | 6 April 1995 (aged 29) | (Slovakia) Nové Zámky |
| 65 | D | Arvils Bergmanis | 1.81 m (5 ft 11 in) | 79 kg (174 lb) | 29 December 1999 (aged 24) | (United States) Alaska Nanooks |
| 70 | F | Miks Indrašis | 1.93 m (6 ft 4 in) | 89 kg (196 lb) | 30 September 1990 (aged 33) | (Sweden) Brynäs IF |
| 71 | F | Roberts Bukarts – A | 1.82 m (6 ft 0 in) | 84 kg (185 lb) | 27 June 1990 (aged 33) | (Czech Republic) Vítkovice Ridera |
| 72 | D | Jānis Jaks | 1.83 m (6 ft 0 in) | 86 kg (190 lb) | 22 August 1995 (aged 28) | (Czech Republic) HC Litvínov |
| 77 | D | Kristaps Zīle | 1.85 m (6 ft 1 in) | 86 kg (190 lb) | 24 December 1997 (aged 26) | (Czech Republic) HC Litvínov |
| 82 | F | Fēlikss Gavars | 1.80 m (5 ft 11 in) | 82 kg (181 lb) | 15 May 2002 (aged 21) | (United States) St. Lawrence Saints |
| 85 | F | Dans Ločmelis | 1.85 m (6 ft 1 in) | 81 kg (179 lb) | 21 January 2004 (aged 20) | (United States) UMass Minutemen |
| 95 | F | Oskars Batņa | 1.95 m (6 ft 5 in) | 106 kg (234 lb) | 7 May 1995 (aged 29) | (Finland) Mikkelin Jukurit |
| 97 | F | Haralds Egle | 1.80 m (5 ft 11 in) | 95 kg (209 lb) | 11 May 1996 (aged 27) | (Slovakia) MHk 32 Liptovský Mikuláš |

=== Poland ===
The roster was announced on 7 May 2024.

Head coach: (Slovakia) Róbert Kaláber

| No. | Pos. | Name | Height | Weight | Birthdate | Team |
|---|---|---|---|---|---|---|
| 3 | D | Bartosz Ciura | 1.86 m (6 ft 1 in) | 90 kg (200 lb) | 20 November 1992 (aged 31) | (Poland) GKS Tychy |
| 4 | D | Patryk Wajda | 1.81 m (5 ft 11 in) | 83 kg (183 lb) | 20 May 1988 (aged 35) | (Poland) JKH GKS Jastrzębie |
| 5 | F | Filip Komorski | 1.80 m (5 ft 11 in) | 86 kg (190 lb) | 27 December 1991 (aged 32) | (Poland) GKS Tychy |
| 6 | D | Arkadiusz Kostek | 1.84 m (6 ft 0 in) | 84 kg (185 lb) | 16 June 1994 (aged 29) | (Poland) JKH GKS Jastrzębie |
| 10 | F | Bartosz Fraszko | 1.81 m (5 ft 11 in) | 82 kg (181 lb) | 26 October 1995 (aged 28) | (Poland) GKS Katowice |
| 12 | D | Maciej Kruczek | 1.87 m (6 ft 2 in) | 90 kg (200 lb) | 26 January 1988 (aged 36) | (Poland) GKS Katowice |
| 14 | F | Dominik Paś | 1.77 m (5 ft 10 in) | 67 kg (148 lb) | 21 September 1999 (aged 24) | (Poland) JKH GKS Jastrzębie |
| 15 | F | Patryk Wronka | 1.71 m (5 ft 7 in) | 77 kg (170 lb) | 28 August 1995 (aged 28) | (Poland) Podhale Nowy Targ |
| 16 | F | Paweł Zygmunt | 1.90 m (6 ft 3 in) | 96 kg (212 lb) | 19 November 1999 (aged 24) | (Czech Republic) HC Litvínov |
| 17 | D | Kamil Górny | 1.82 m (6 ft 0 in) | 88 kg (194 lb) | 20 September 1989 (aged 34) | (Poland) JKH GKS Jastrzębie |
| 18 | F | Grzegorz Pasiut – A | 1.85 m (6 ft 1 in) | 92 kg (203 lb) | 7 May 1987 (aged 37) | (Poland) GKS Katowice |
| 20 | D | Marcin Kolusz – A | 1.86 m (6 ft 1 in) | 87 kg (192 lb) | 18 January 1985 (aged 39) | (Poland) JKH GKS Jastrzębie |
| 21 | F | Kamil Wałęga | 1.83 m (6 ft 0 in) | 80 kg (180 lb) | 21 July 2000 (aged 23) | (Czech Republic) HC Oceláři Třinec |
| 28 | F | Mateusz Michalski | 1.86 m (6 ft 1 in) | 90 kg (200 lb) | 29 July 1992 (aged 31) | (Poland) GKS Katowice |
| 31 | G | John Murray | 1.85 m (6 ft 1 in) | 99 kg (218 lb) | 4 July 1987 (aged 36) | (Poland) GKS Katowice |
| 33 | G | Tomáš Fučík | 1.89 m (6 ft 2 in) | 90 kg (200 lb) | 17 March 1994 (aged 30) | (Poland) GKS Tychy |
| 34 | F | Krzysztof Maciaś | 1.82 m (6 ft 0 in) | 86 kg (190 lb) | 14 May 2004 (aged 19) | (Canada) Prince Albert Raiders |
| 51 | D | Jakub Wanacki | 1.93 m (6 ft 4 in) | 93 kg (205 lb) | 12 March 1991 (aged 33) | (Poland) GKS Katowice |
| 61 | F | Krystian Dziubiński – C | 1.81 m (5 ft 11 in) | 86 kg (190 lb) | 28 May 1988 (aged 35) | (Poland) TH Unia Oświęcim |
| 69 | D | Mateusz Bryk | 1.82 m (6 ft 0 in) | 89 kg (196 lb) | 24 August 1989 (aged 34) | (Poland) GKS Tychy |
| 71 | D | Paweł Dronia | 1.81 m (5 ft 11 in) | 90 kg (200 lb) | 30 June 1989 (aged 34) | (Germany) Ravensburg Towerstars |
| 72 | G | David Zabolotny | 1.80 m (5 ft 11 in) | 75 kg (165 lb) | 31 March 1994 (aged 30) | (Germany) EHC Freiburg |
| 80 | D | Kacper Maciaś | 1.87 m (6 ft 2 in) | 92 kg (203 lb) | 12 April 2003 (aged 21) | (Poland) GKS Katowice |
| 88 | F | Alan Łyszczarczyk | 1.83 m (6 ft 0 in) | 83 kg (183 lb) | 17 February 1998 (aged 26) | (Poland) GKS Tychy |
| 92 | F | Maciej Urbanowicz | 1.81 m (5 ft 11 in) | 87 kg (192 lb) | 12 July 1986 (aged 37) | (Poland) JKH GKS Jastrzębie |
| 98 | F | Patryk Krężołek | 1.85 m (6 ft 1 in) | 80 kg (180 lb) | 14 September 1998 (aged 25) | (Poland) KH Zagłębie Sosnowiec |

=== Slovakia ===
A 27-player roster was announced on 3 May 2024. The final squad was revealed on four days later.

Head coach: (Canada) Craig Ramsay

| No. | Pos. | Name | Height | Weight | Birthdate | Team |
|---|---|---|---|---|---|---|
| 6 | F | Lukáš Cingel | 1.87 m (6 ft 2 in) | 88 kg (194 lb) | 10 June 1992 (aged 31) | (Czech Republic) Kometa Brno |
| 7 | D | Mário Grman | 1.86 m (6 ft 1 in) | 89 kg (196 lb) | 11 April 1997 (aged 27) | (Czech Republic) HC Vítkovice |
| 13 | D | František Gajdoš | 1.80 m (5 ft 11 in) | 85 kg (187 lb) | 7 June 2001 (aged 22) | (Slovakia) HK Nitra |
| 14 | D | Peter Čerešňák – A | 1.91 m (6 ft 3 in) | 95 kg (209 lb) | 26 January 1993 (aged 31) | (Czech Republic) Dynamo Pardubice |
| 17 | D | Šimon Nemec | 1.85 m (6 ft 1 in) | 92 kg (203 lb) | 15 February 2004 (aged 20) | (United States) New Jersey Devils |
| 18 | F | Andrej Kudrna | 1.89 m (6 ft 2 in) | 95 kg (209 lb) | 11 May 1991 (aged 32) | (Czech Republic) HC Litvínov |
| 20 | F | Juraj Slafkovský | 1.92 m (6 ft 4 in) | 103 kg (227 lb) | 30 March 2004 (aged 20) | (Canada) Montreal Canadiens |
| 21 | F | Miloš Kelemen | 1.88 m (6 ft 2 in) | 96 kg (212 lb) | 6 July 1999 (aged 24) | (United States) Tucson Roadrunners |
| 27 | F | Marek Hrivík – A | 1.85 m (6 ft 1 in) | 89 kg (196 lb) | 28 August 1991 (aged 32) | (Sweden) Leksands IF |
| 29 | D | Michal Ivan | 1.85 m (6 ft 1 in) | 90 kg (200 lb) | 18 November 1999 (aged 24) | (Czech Republic) Bílí Tygři Liberec |
| 30 | G | Matej Tomek | 1.91 m (6 ft 3 in) | 83 kg (183 lb) | 24 May 1997 (aged 26) | (Czech Republic) HC Litvínov |
| 31 | G | Samuel Hlavaj | 1.93 m (6 ft 4 in) | 99 kg (218 lb) | 29 May 2001 (aged 22) | (Czech Republic) Škoda Plzeň |
| 33 | G | Stanislav Škorvánek | 1.87 m (6 ft 2 in) | 87 kg (192 lb) | 31 January 1996 (aged 28) | (Slovakia) Dukla Michalovce |
| 34 | F | Peter Cehlárik | 1.88 m (6 ft 2 in) | 94 kg (207 lb) | 2 August 1995 (aged 28) | (Sweden) Leksands IF |
| 42 | D | Martin Fehérváry | 1.87 m (6 ft 2 in) | 92 kg (203 lb) | 6 October 1999 (aged 24) | (United States) Washington Capitals |
| 48 | F | Viliam Čacho | 1.83 m (6 ft 0 in) | 82 kg (181 lb) | 14 October 1998 (aged 25) | (Czech Republic) Oceláři Třinec |
| 56 | F | Marko Daňo | 1.82 m (6 ft 0 in) | 96 kg (212 lb) | 30 November 1994 (aged 29) | (Czech Republic) Oceláři Třinec |
| 64 | D | Patrik Koch | 1.86 m (6 ft 1 in) | 86 kg (190 lb) | 8 December 1996 (aged 27) | (United States) Arizona Coyotes |
| 76 | F | Martin Pospíšil | 1.88 m (6 ft 2 in) | 82 kg (181 lb) | 19 November 1999 (aged 24) | (Canada) Calgary Flames |
| 77 | F | Martin Faško-Rudáš | 1.85 m (6 ft 1 in) | 82 kg (181 lb) | 10 August 2000 (aged 23) | (Czech Republic) Bílí Tygři Liberec |
| 79 | F | Libor Hudáček | 1.77 m (5 ft 10 in) | 80 kg (180 lb) | 7 September 1990 (aged 33) | (Czech Republic) Oceláři Třinec |
| 87 | F | Pavol Regenda | 1.92 m (6 ft 4 in) | 99 kg (218 lb) | 7 December 1999 (aged 24) | (United States) San Diego Gulls |
| 90 | F | Tomáš Tatar – C | 1.78 m (5 ft 10 in) | 82 kg (181 lb) | 1 December 1990 (aged 33) | (United States) Seattle Kraken |
| 91 | F | Matúš Sukeľ | 1.76 m (5 ft 9 in) | 77 kg (170 lb) | 23 January 1996 (aged 28) | (Czech Republic) HC Litvínov |
| 98 | D | Andrej Golian | 1.92 m (6 ft 4 in) | 82 kg (181 lb) | 7 March 2001 (aged 23) | (Slovakia) Slovan Bratislava |

=== Sweden ===
The roster was announced on 8 May 2024.

Head coach: Sam Hallam

| No. | Pos. | Name | Height | Weight | Birthdate | Team |
|---|---|---|---|---|---|---|
| 9 | F | Adrian Kempe | 1.90 m (6 ft 3 in) | 90 kg (200 lb) | 13 September 1996 (aged 27) | (United States) Los Angeles Kings |
| 12 | F | Max Friberg | 1.79 m (5 ft 10 in) | 86 kg (190 lb) | 20 November 1992 (aged 31) | (Sweden) Frölunda HC |
| 14 | F | Joel Eriksson Ek | 1.90 m (6 ft 3 in) | 95 kg (209 lb) | 29 January 1997 (aged 27) | (United States) Minnesota Wild |
| 16 | F | Felix Unger Sörum | 1.82 m (6 ft 0 in) | 82 kg (181 lb) | 14 September 2005 (aged 18) | (Sweden) Leksands IF |
| 19 | F | Marcus Sörensen | 1.81 m (5 ft 11 in) | 80 kg (180 lb) | 7 April 1992 (aged 32) | (Switzerland) HC Fribourg-Gottéron |
| 23 | F | Lucas Raymond – A | 1.82 m (6 ft 0 in) | 86 kg (190 lb) | 28 March 2002 (aged 22) | (United States) Detroit Red Wings |
| 25 | D | Jonas Brodin | 1.85 m (6 ft 1 in) | 88 kg (194 lb) | 12 July 1993 (aged 30) | (United States) Minnesota Wild |
| 26 | D | Rasmus Dahlin | 1.90 m (6 ft 3 in) | 94 kg (207 lb) | 13 April 2000 (aged 24) | (United States) Buffalo Sabres |
| 28 | D | Marcus Pettersson | 1.94 m (6 ft 4 in) | 78 kg (172 lb) | 8 May 1996 (aged 28) | (United States) Pittsburgh Penguins |
| 29 | F | Pontus Holmberg | 1.82 m (6 ft 0 in) | 89 kg (196 lb) | 9 March 1999 (aged 25) | (Canada) Toronto Maple Leafs |
| 30 | G | Jesper Wallstedt | 1.91 m (6 ft 3 in) | 97 kg (214 lb) | 14 November 2002 (aged 21) | (United States) Minnesota Wild |
| 32 | D | Lukas Bengtsson | 1.78 m (5 ft 10 in) | 83 kg (183 lb) | 14 April 1994 (aged 30) | (Switzerland) EV Zug |
| 33 | G | Samuel Ersson | 1.91 m (6 ft 3 in) | 90 kg (200 lb) | 20 October 1999 (aged 24) | (United States) Philadelphia Flyers |
| 35 | G | Filip Gustavsson | 1.88 m (6 ft 2 in) | 90 kg (200 lb) | 7 June 1998 (aged 25) | (United States) Minnesota Wild |
| 37 | F | Isac Lundeström | 1.84 m (6 ft 0 in) | 85 kg (187 lb) | 6 November 1999 (aged 24) | (United States) Anaheim Ducks |
| 49 | F | Fabian Zetterlund | 1.80 m (5 ft 11 in) | 92 kg (203 lb) | 25 August 1999 (aged 24) | (United States) San Jose Sharks |
| 59 | F | Linus Johansson | 1.91 m (6 ft 3 in) | 88 kg (194 lb) | 30 November 1992 (aged 31) | (Sweden) Färjestad BK |
| 65 | D | Erik Karlsson – C | 1.81 m (5 ft 11 in) | 79 kg (174 lb) | 31 May 1990 (aged 33) | (United States) Pittsburgh Penguins |
| 71 | F | Victor Olofsson | 1.80 m (5 ft 11 in) | 83 kg (183 lb) | 18 July 1995 (aged 28) | (United States) Buffalo Sabres |
| 72 | D | Tim Heed | 1.83 m (6 ft 0 in) | 85 kg (187 lb) | 27 January 1991 (aged 33) | (Switzerland) HC Ambrì-Piotta |
| 77 | D | Victor Hedman – A | 1.98 m (6 ft 6 in) | 110 kg (240 lb) | 18 December 1990 (aged 33) | (United States) Tampa Bay Lightning |
| 82 | F | Jesper Frödén | 1.85 m (6 ft 1 in) | 84 kg (185 lb) | 21 September 1994 (aged 29) | (Switzerland) ZSC Lions |
| 90 | F | Marcus Johansson | 1.85 m (6 ft 1 in) | 90 kg (200 lb) | 6 October 1990 (aged 33) | (United States) Minnesota Wild |
| 91 | F | Carl Grundström | 1.84 m (6 ft 0 in) | 93 kg (205 lb) | 1 December 1997 (aged 26) | (United States) Los Angeles Kings |
| 95 | F | André Burakovsky | 1.86 m (6 ft 1 in) | 93 kg (205 lb) | 9 February 1995 (aged 29) | (United States) Seattle Kraken |

=== United States ===
15 players were announced on 24 April 2024. Nine more were added on 5 May.

Head coach: John Hynes

| No. | Pos. | Name | Height | Weight | Birthdate | Team |
|---|---|---|---|---|---|---|
| 1 | G | Trey Augustine | 1.85 m (6 ft 1 in) | 81 kg (179 lb) | 23 February 2005 (aged 19) | (United States) Michigan State Spartans |
| 4 | D | Seth Jones – A | 1.93 m (6 ft 4 in) | 97 kg (214 lb) | 3 October 1994 (aged 29) | (United States) Chicago Blackhawks |
| 5 | D | Michael Kesselring | 1.92 m (6 ft 4 in) | 86 kg (190 lb) | 13 January 2000 (aged 24) | (United States) Arizona Coyotes |
| 6 | F | Will Smith | 1.83 m (6 ft 0 in) | 82 kg (181 lb) | 17 March 2005 (aged 19) | (United States) Boston College Eagles |
| 7 | F | Brady Tkachuk – C | 1.93 m (6 ft 4 in) | 102 kg (225 lb) | 16 September 1999 (aged 24) | (Canada) Ottawa Senators |
| 8 | D | Zach Werenski – A | 1.88 m (6 ft 2 in) | 99 kg (218 lb) | 19 July 1997 (aged 26) | (United States) Columbus Blue Jackets |
| 9 | F | Trevor Zegras | 1.83 m (6 ft 0 in) | 84 kg (185 lb) | 20 March 2001 (aged 23) | (United States) Anaheim Ducks |
| 11 | F | Luke Kunin | 1.83 m (6 ft 0 in) | 89 kg (196 lb) | 4 December 1997 (aged 26) | (United States) San Jose Sharks |
| 12 | F | Matt Boldy | 1.88 m (6 ft 2 in) | 91 kg (201 lb) | 5 April 2001 (aged 23) | (United States) Minnesota Wild |
| 13 | F | Johnny Gaudreau | 1.75 m (5 ft 9 in) | 74 kg (163 lb) | 13 August 1993 (aged 30) | (United States) Columbus Blue Jackets |
| 22 | F | Cole Caufield | 1.73 m (5 ft 8 in) | 79 kg (174 lb) | 2 January 2001 (aged 23) | (Canada) Montreal Canadiens |
| 23 | F | Mikey Eyssimont | 1.83 m (6 ft 0 in) | 86 kg (190 lb) | 9 September 1996 (aged 27) | (United States) Tampa Bay Lightning |
| 24 | F | Ryan Leonard | 1.83 m (6 ft 0 in) | 86 kg (190 lb) | 21 January 2005 (aged 19) | (United States) Boston College Eagles |
| 26 | F | Kevin Hayes | 1.96 m (6 ft 5 in) | 98 kg (216 lb) | 8 May 1992 (aged 32) | (United States) St. Louis Blues |
| 29 | F | Brock Nelson | 1.93 m (6 ft 4 in) | 96 kg (212 lb) | 15 October 1991 (aged 32) | (United States) New York Islanders |
| 34 | G | Alex Lyon | 1.85 m (6 ft 1 in) | 89 kg (196 lb) | 9 December 1992 (aged 31) | (United States) Detroit Red Wings |
| 39 | G | Alex Nedeljkovic | 1.83 m (6 ft 0 in) | 92 kg (203 lb) | 7 January 1996 (aged 28) | (United States) Pittsburgh Penguins |
| 43 | D | Luke Hughes | 1.88 m (6 ft 2 in) | 89 kg (196 lb) | 9 September 2003 (aged 20) | (United States) New Jersey Devils |
| 45 | F | Gavin Brindley | 1.75 m (5 ft 9 in) | 77 kg (170 lb) | 5 October 2004 (aged 19) | (United States) Columbus Blue Jackets |
| 46 | D | Jeff Petry | 1.91 m (6 ft 3 in) | 94 kg (207 lb) | 9 December 1987 (aged 36) | (United States) Detroit Red Wings |
| 51 | D | Matthew Kessel | 1.88 m (6 ft 2 in) | 93 kg (205 lb) | 23 June 2000 (aged 23) | (United States) St. Louis Blues |
| 57 | F | Shane Pinto | 1.91 m (6 ft 3 in) | 91 kg (201 lb) | 12 November 2000 (aged 23) | (Canada) Ottawa Senators |
| 72 | D | Alex Vlasic | 1.98 m (6 ft 6 in) | 98 kg (216 lb) | 5 June 2001 (aged 22) | (United States) Chicago Blackhawks |
| 79 | G | Charlie Lindgren | 1.85 m (6 ft 1 in) | 83 kg (183 lb) | 18 December 1993 (aged 30) | (United States) Washington Capitals |
| 85 | D | Jake Sanderson | 1.88 m (6 ft 2 in) | 92 kg (203 lb) | 8 July 2002 (aged 21) | (Canada) Ottawa Senators |
| 86 | F | Joel Farabee | 1.83 m (6 ft 0 in) | 84 kg (185 lb) | 25 February 2000 (aged 24) | (United States) Philadelphia Flyers |
