= Mikko Juusola =

Finnish ice hockey winger

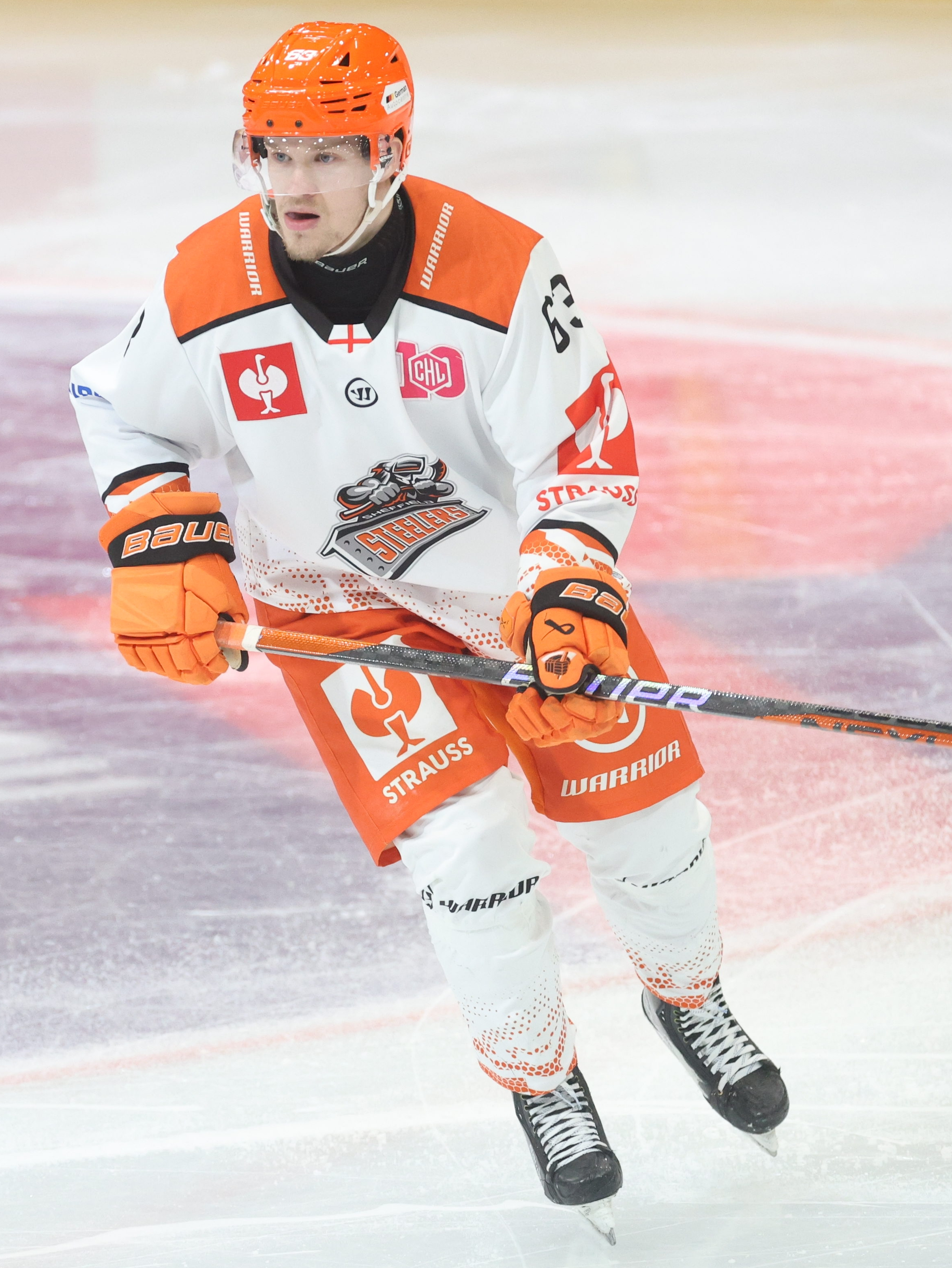
- Mikko Juusola in 2024
- Born: March 18, 1998 (age 27); Kuusamo, Finland
- Height: 5 ft 10 in (178 cm)
- Weight: 176 lb (80 kg; 12 st 8 lb)
- Position: Winger
- Shoots: Left
- EIHL team Former teams: Sheffield Steelers; KalPa; SaiPa
- Playing career: 2017–present

Mikko Juusola (born March 17, 1998) is a Finnish professional ice hockey winger who currently plays for Sheffield Steelers in the Elite Ice Hockey League (EIHL).

Juusola began his career with Karpat's junior team for two seasons, before moving to KalPa in 2015. He made his Liiga debut for KalPa during the 2017–18 season, playing seven games and scoring one goal.

In 2023, Juusola agreed to terms with the UK Elite Ice Hockey League side Sheffield Steelers. He would win the Grand Slam with the Steelers. In June 2024, Juusola re-signed with Sheffield Steelers.
