= Robert Dowd (ice hockey) =

English ice hockey player (born 1988)

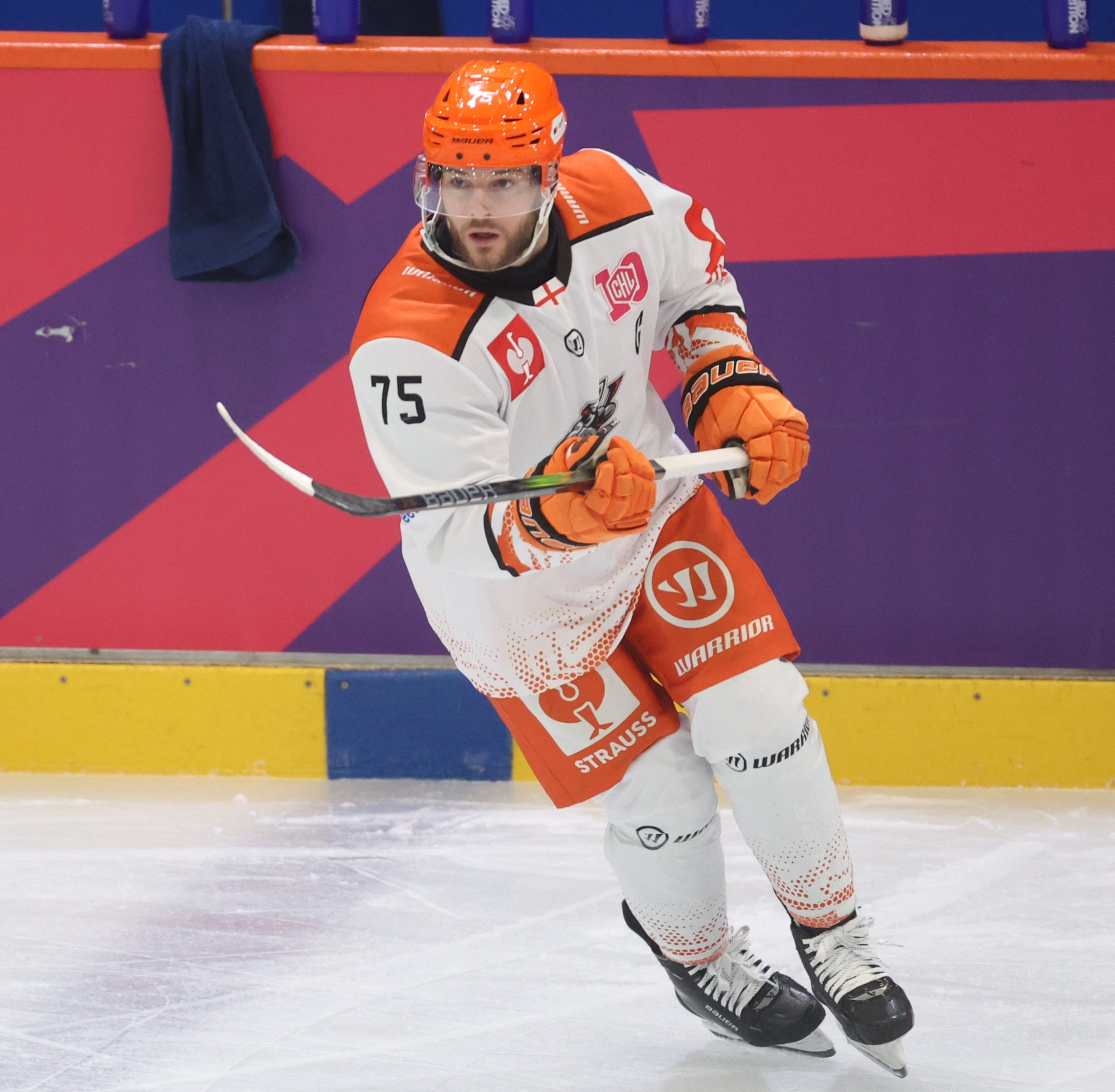
- Robert Dowd in 2024
- Born: 26 May 1988 (age 38) Billingham, England
- Height: 5 ft 10 in (178 cm)
- Weight: 174 lb (79 kg; 12 st 6 lb)
- Position: Forward
- Shoots: Right
- EIHL team Former teams: Sheffield Steelers; Sheffield Scimitars; IF Troja/Ljungby; Belfast Giants; Billingham Bombers; HC Eppan Pirates
- National team: Great Britain
- Playing career: 2003–present

Robert Dowd (born 26 May 1988) is an English professional ice hockey player who is a forward for the Sheffield Steelers of the Elite Ice Hockey League (EIHL).

He also previously played in the HockeyAllsvenskan for IF Troja/Ljungby and Elite Ice Hockey League for the Sheffield Steelers and the Belfast Giants and is a six-time EIHL champion, five times with Sheffield in 2009, 2011, 2015, 2016 and 2024 and once with Belfast in 2012. He was the top British points scorer in 2012 with 72 points and was named British Player of the Year. He is also a member of the Great Britain national ice hockey team.

== Playing career ==
On 22 April 2012, it was announced Dowd had signed with Swedish team IF Troja/Ljungby, who play in the HockeyAllsvenskan, the country's second-tier league.

In 2013, Dowd agreed a deal to return to his former club, Sheffield Steelers, for the 2013–14 season.

In October 2020, following news that the 2020-21 Elite League season was indefinitely suspended due to ongoing coronavirus restrictions, Dowd and fellow Sheffield forward Marc-Olivier Vallerand agreed deals to sign for Italy2 side HC Eppan Pirates.

The move to Italy was a temporary switch, with Dowd agreeing a two-year contract extension with Sheffield until 2023 before the move was confirmed.

At the start of the 2023–24 EIHL season, Dowd was named Captain of the Sheffield Steelers. Later that season, he was also named the captain for Great Britain.

On 19 October 2024, Dowd scored a goal in a 6-3 win over the Glasgow Clan. It was the 740th point of his career, making him the EIHL's all-time leading point-scorer.

On 19 February 2025, Dowd scored in the Steelers' 8-1 win over the Fife Flyers. This was Robert's 357th professional Steelers goal, breaking the record of 356 set by Steve Nemeth.

On 12 September 2026, Dowd got his 792nd point, equalising Ron Shudra's record for Sheffield Steelers points.
