= Ara Nazarian =

American engineer

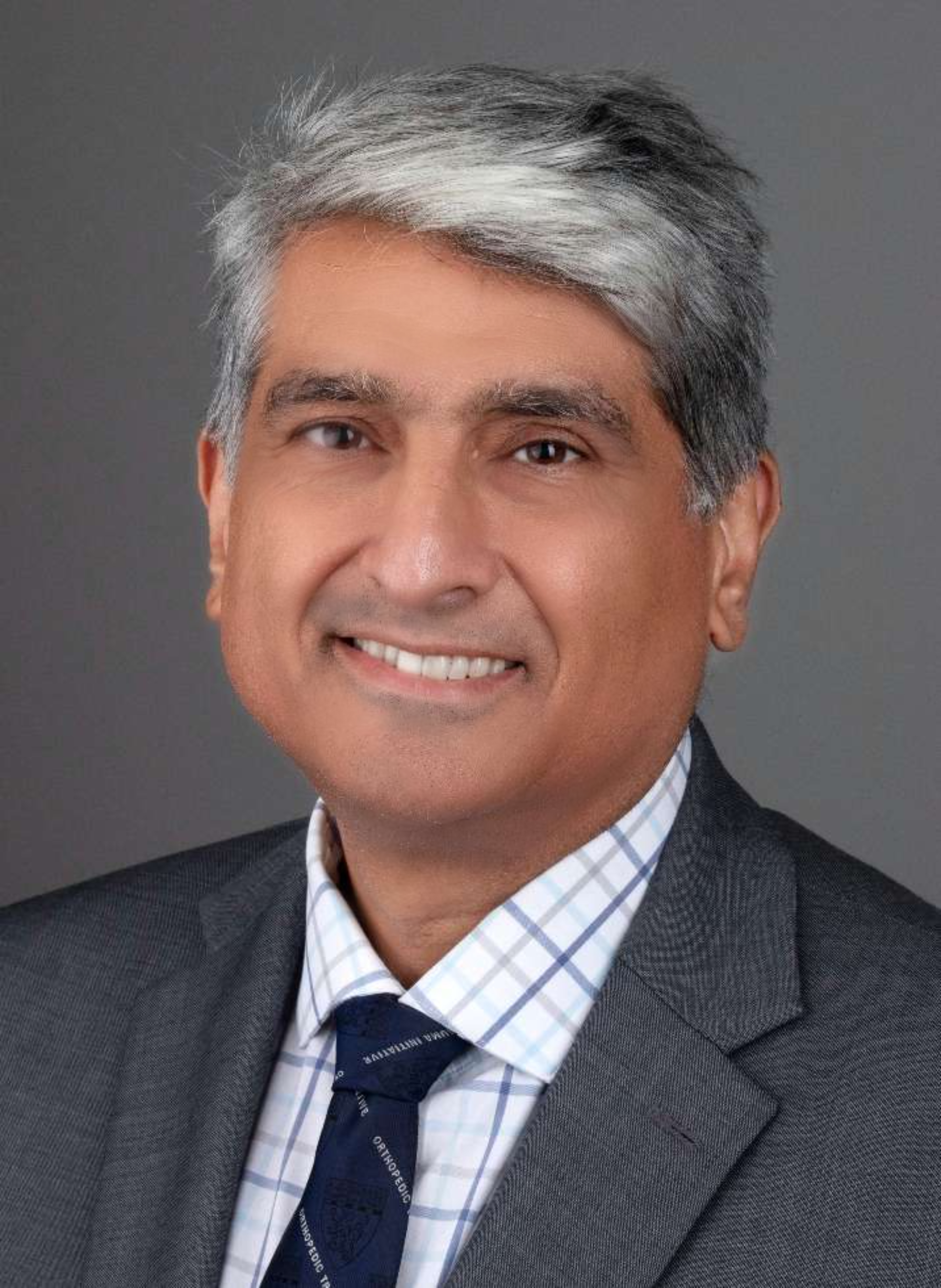
- Born: June 10, 1971 (age 54)
- Education: Tennessee Technological University; Boston University; ETH Zurich; Harvard University
- Occupations: Musculoskeletal Health Scientist; Biomedical engineer; Entrepreneur; Author

Ara Nazarian (born June 10, 1971) is an American biomedical engineer, academic, and entrepreneur. He is the co-author of the textbook Low-Frequency Electromagnetic Modeling for Electrical and Biological Systems Using MATLAB. He is also the co-founder of the ski technology company Verispellis. His academic research has been cited over 11,000 times.

== Education ==
Nazarian earned a mechanical engineering degree from Tennessee Technological University, then went on to obtain graduate degrees from Boston University, the Swiss Federal Institute of Technology, and Harvard University.

== Research and career ==
In 2017, Nazarian co-founded the ski technology company Verispellis with orthopedic surgeon colleague Ken Rodriguez after developing skis and snowboards using Nitinol alloy technology.

In 2021, Nazarian received a Blavatnik Therapeutics Challenge Award from Harvard Medical School for his work on a protein therapy for frozen shoulder. Nazarian co-developed the therapy after researching the effects of administering the protein hormone relaxin to animal models with stiff shoulder joints at the Beth Israel Deaconess Medical Center.

As of 2025, he serves as an Associate Professor of Orthopaedic Surgery at Harvard Medical School and the Founding Director of the Musculoskeletal Translational Innovation Initiative at Beth Israel Deaconess Medical Center (BIDMC). Currently, he serves as the Vice Chair of Research for the Carl J. Shapiro Department of Orthopaedic Surgery at BIDMC.

== Personal life ==
Nazarian is of Armenian descent and lives in Boston, MA.. He is a writer for the Armenian Weekly publication covering Armenian political issues. He criticized the peace deal between Armenia and Azerbaijan brokered by President Donald Trump in 2025, opining that the deal encroached on Armenian sovereignty.

== Bibliography ==
=== Books ===
- Makarov, S. N., Noetscher, G. M., Nazarian, A. (2015). Low-Frequency Electromagnetic Modeling for Electrical and Biological Systems Using MATLAB. United Kingdom: Wiley.

=== Selected publications ===
- Ghiasi, M. S., Chen, J., Vaziri, A., Rodriguez, E. K., & Nazarian, A. (2017). Bone fracture healing in mechanobiological modeling: A review of principles and methods. Bone Reports, 6, 87-100.
- Le, H. V., Lee, S. J., Nazarian, A., & Rodriguez, E. K. (2017). Adhesive capsulitis of the shoulder: review of pathophysiology and current clinical treatments. Shoulder & Elbow, 9(2), 75-84.
- Li, C., Guo, C., Fitzpatrick, V., Ibrahim, A., Zwierstra, M. J., Hanna, P., Leichtig, A., Nazarian, A.,... & Kaplan, D. L. (2020). Design of biodegradable, implantable devices towards clinical translation. Nature Reviews Materials, 5(1), 61-81.
- Oftadeh, R., Perez-Viloria, M., Villa-Camacho, J. C., Vaziri, A., & Nazarian, A. (2015). Biomechanics and mechanobiology of trabecular bone: a review. Journal of biomechanical engineering, 137(1), 010802.
- Razavi, A. H., Hemmati, M., Nafisi, N., Mirahmadi, A., Laiwala, S., Keko, M., ... & Nazarian, A. (2025). Mechanobiology-guided machine learning models for predicting long bone fracture healing across diverse scenarios. Computers in Biology and Medicine, 196, 110683.
