= Jan Ščotka =

Czech ice hockey player

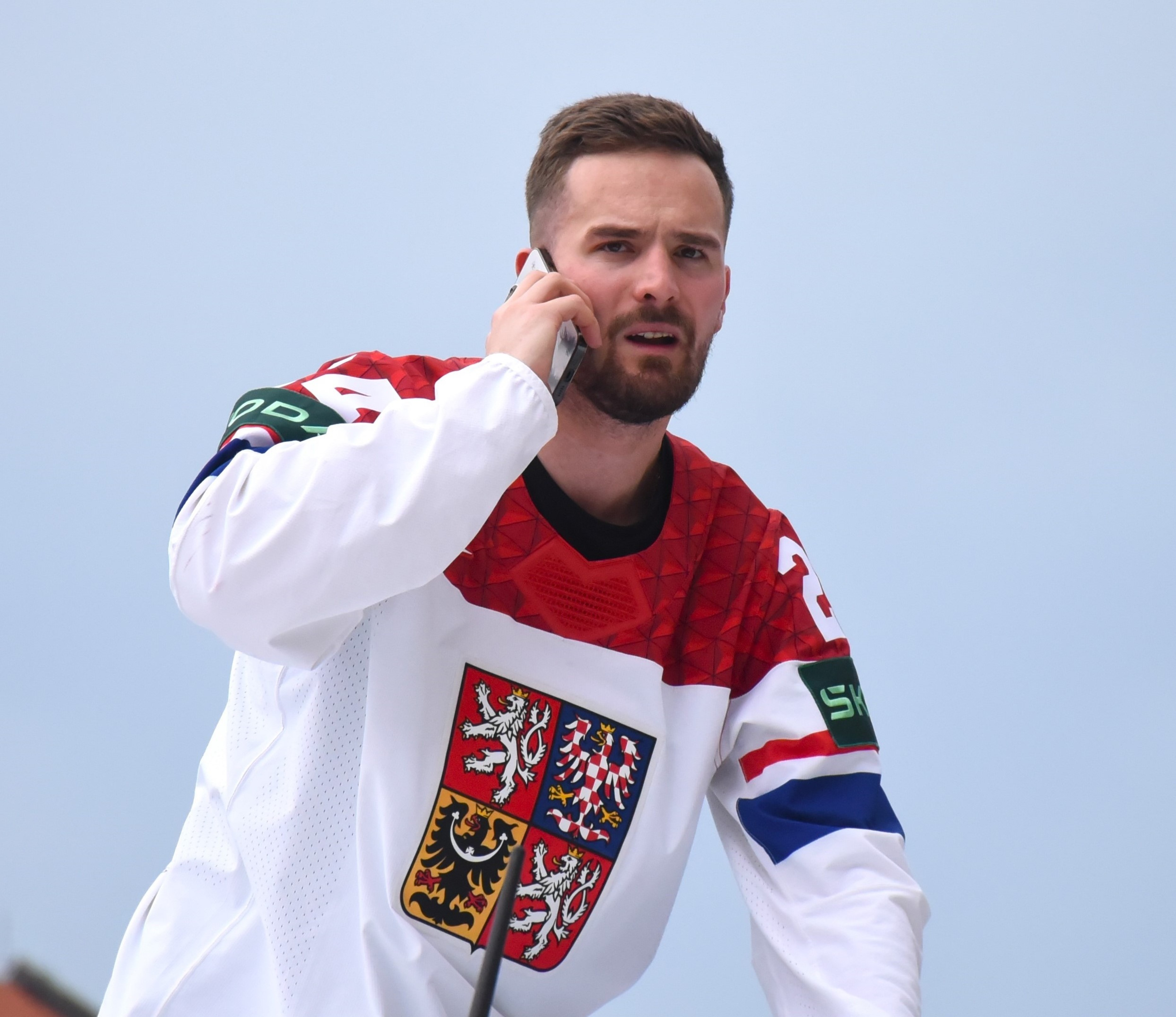
- Ščotka in 2024
- Born: May 20, 1996 (age 30) Vsetín, Czech Republic
- Height: 6 ft 2 in (188 cm)
- Weight: 201 lb (91 kg; 14 st 5 lb)
- Position: Defence
- Shoots: Left
- Czech team: HC Kometa Brno
- Playing career: 2012–present

Medal record

Men's ice hockey

Representing the Czech Republic

World Championships
Gold medal – first place	2024 Czechia	
Bronze medal – third place	2022 Finland	

Jan Ščotka (born May 20, 1996) is a Czech professional ice hockey player who is a defenceman for HC Kometa Brno of the Czech Extraliga (ELH).

Ščotka made his Czech Extraliga debut playing with HC Pardubice during the 2014–15 Czech Extraliga season.

== Career statistics ==
=== International ===
Year	Team	Event	Result	GP	G	A	Pts	PIM
2014	Czech Republic	WJC18	2nd place, silver medalist(s)	6	0	0	0	2
2014	Czech Republic	IH18	2nd place, silver medalist(s)	4	0	0	0	0
2015	Czech Republic	WJC	6th	5	0	0	0	4
2016	Czech Republic	WJC	5th	5	0	0	0	0
2022	Czech Republic	WC	3rd place, bronze medalist(s)	10	0	1	1	2
2024	Czech Republic	WC	1st place, gold medalist(s)	1	0	0	0	0
2026	Czech Republic	WC	5th	5	0	0	0	25
Junior totals				20	0	0	0	6
Senior totals				16	0	1	1	27
