= Marc-Olivier Vallerand =

Canadian ice hockey player

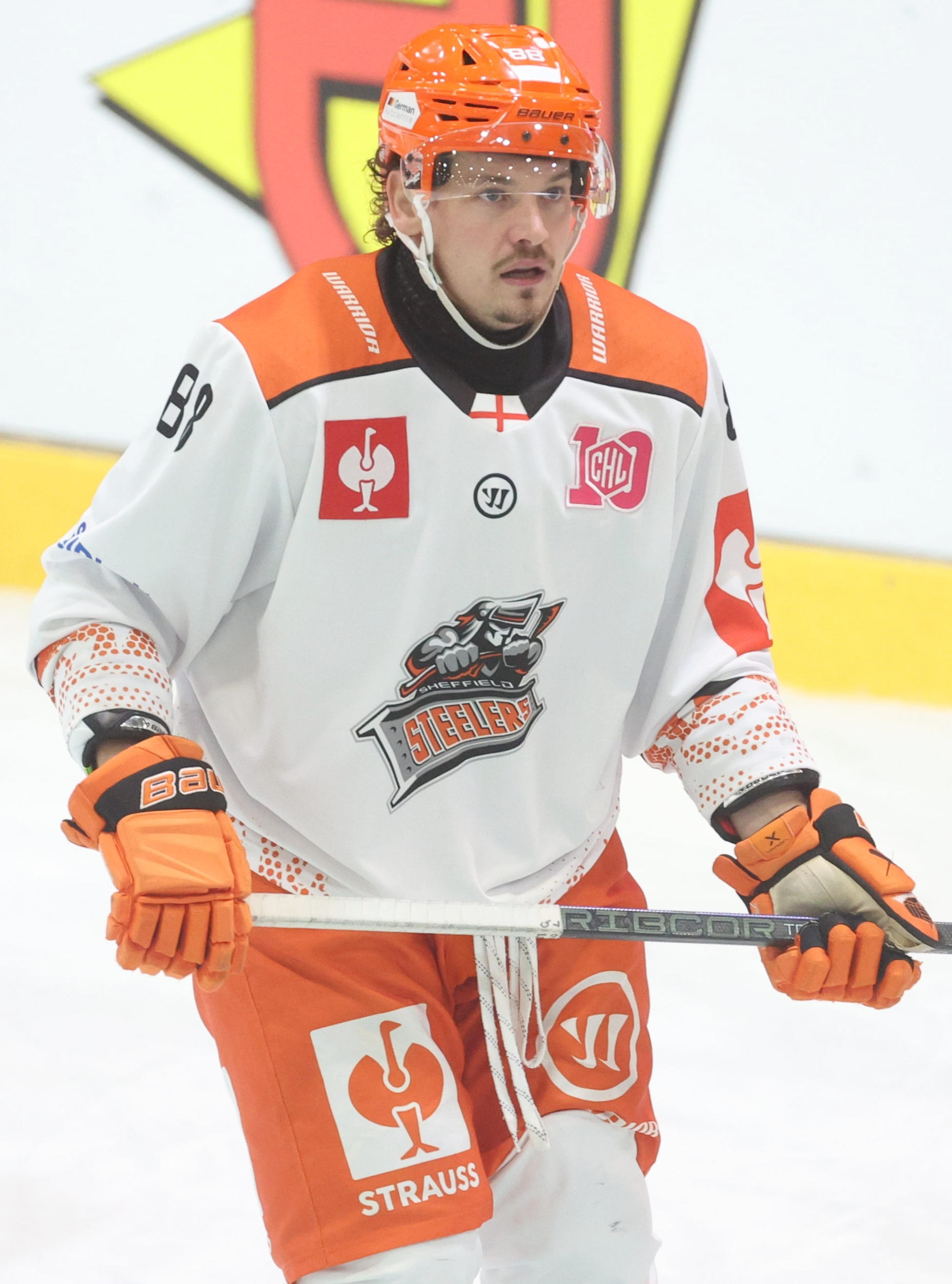
- Vallerand with the Sheffield Steelers in 2024
- Born: April 17, 1989 (age 36) Longueuil, Quebec, Canada
- Height: 5 ft 11 in (180 cm)
- Weight: 200 lb (91 kg; 14 st 4 lb)
- Shoots: Left
- Oberliga team Former teams: Hannover Scorpions; Coventry Blaze; Bridgeport Sound Tigers; Rockford IceHogs; Norfolk Admirals; Greenville Road Warriors; Odense Bulldogs; HC La Chaux-de-Fonds; HC Bolzano; EHC Lustenau; HC Eppan Pirates; HK Olimpija; Sheffield Steelers
- NHL draft: Undrafted
- Playing career: 2010–present

Marc-Olivier Vallerand (born April 17, 1989) is a Canadian professional ice hockey player who is currently playing for German Oberliga side Hannover Scorpions. Vallerand previously played for UK Elite Ice Hockey League (EIHL) side Sheffield Steelers and ICEHL side HK Olimpija.

== Playing career ==
Undrafted, Vallerand previously played with the Greenville Road Warriors of the ECHL, and the Odense Bulldogs in the Danish AL-Bank Ligaen during the 2013-14 season. After a season with HC Eppan Pirates of the Italian Serie A, Vallerand continued his journeyman career in returning to North America briefly before signing a contract in Switzerland.

On July 27, 2016, Vallerand made a return to Italy, signing a one-year deal with Austrian EBEL participants, HCB South Tyrol.

On July 27, 2017, Vallerand moved to the UK to sign for Elite Ice Hockey League side Coventry Blaze.

For the 2018/2019 season, Vallerand moved to Austria to sign for Alps Hockey League side EHC Lustenau.

For the 2019/2020 season, Vallerand moved back to the UK to sign for EIHL side Sheffield Steelers.

On July 2, 2020, Vallerand re-signed with Sheffield for the 2020/21 campaign.

However, following the indefinite suspension of the 2020/21 Elite League season, Vallerand and Sheffield teammate Robert Dowd signed for Italian club HC Eppan Pirates in October 2020.

Before returning to Eppan for a second spell, Vallerand signed a contract extension with Sheffield, committing him to the club for the 2021-22 Elite League season.

In February 2021, Vallerand signed for AlpsHL side HK Olimpija on a deal until the end of the season.

Ahead of the 2021-22 EIHL season, Vallerand re-joined the Sheffield Steelers as planned. For the 2022-23 season, Vallerand returned to HK Olimpija. He then rejoined Sheffield in January 2023.

In 2025, Vallerand departed the Sheffield Steelers. He later agreed terms with German third tier side Hannover Scorpions for the 2025-26 season.

== Awards and honors ==
- Named to the 2011 ECHL All-Star Game's starting line-up.
