= Ben Lake (ice hockey) =

British ice hockey player (born 1990)

- Born: 31 May 1990 (age 35) Calgary, Alberta, Canada
- Height: 1.80 m (5 ft 11 in)
- Weight: 77 kg (170 lb; 12 st 2 lb)
- Position: Forward
- Shoots: Left
- EIHL team Former teams: Belfast Giants; Alaska Aces; Coventry Blaze; Sheffield Steeldogs; Manchester Storm
- National team: Great Britain
- NHL draft: Undrafted
- Playing career: 2015–present

Ben Lake (born 31 May 1990) is a Canadian-born British ice hockey player for Belfast Giants and the British national team.

Lake has previously played for ECHL side Alaska Aces and British EIHL teams Coventry Blaze and Manchester Storm.

In November 2020, with the 2020-21 EIHL season indefinitely suspended due to coronavirus, Lake dropped down a division and joined NIHL side Sheffield Steeldogs for their 'Streaming Series'.

He represented Great Britain at the 2019 IIHF World Championship, 2021 IIHF World Championship and 2022 IIHF World Championship.
