= Sam Jones (ice hockey) =

English ice hockey player (born 1997)

- Born: 11 November 1997 (age 28) Walsall, England
- Height: 1.91 m (6 ft 3 in)
- Weight: 86.5 kg (191 lb; 13 st 9 lb)
- Position: Defence
- Shot: Right
- team Former teams: Retired; Milton Keynes Lightning; Swindon Wildcats; Fife Flyers; Sheffield Steelers; CSM Corona Brașov; Guildford Flames; Belfast Giants
- National team: Great Britain
- NHL draft: Undrafted
- Playing career: 2016–2026

Sam Jones (born 11 November 1997) is a retired English ice hockey player who played the British national team. His family, including elder brother Adam who also became a high-level hockey player, moved to Canada in the mid-2000s.

He represented Great Britain at the 2021 IIHF World Championship, 2022 IIHF World Championship and 2024 IIHF World Championship.

Jones announced his retirement from Ice hockey on January 30, 2026 after playing just 11 games for the Belfast Giants in the 2025–26 season.
