= Sam Duggan =

English ice hockey player (born 1998)

- Born: 13 July 1998 (age 28) Reading, Berkshire, England
- Height: 1.87 m (6 ft 2 in)
- Weight: 90 kg (198 lb; 14 st 2 lb)
- Position: Centre/Right wing
- Shoots: Right
- EIHL team Former teams: Cardiff Devils; Segeltorps IF; Coventry Blaze
- National team: Great Britain
- NHL draft: Undrafted
- Playing career: 2019–present

Samuel Duggan (born 13 July 1998) is an English ice hockey player for Cardiff Devils and the British national team.

He represented Great Britain at the 2021 IIHF World Championship, 2022 IIHF World Championship and 2024 IIHF World Championship.
