= 2024 World Junior Ice Hockey Championships – Division II =

International ice hockey tournament

2024 IIHF U20 World Championship Division II
Tournament details
- Host countries: Great Britain; Serbia
- Venues: 2 (in 2 host cities)
- Dates: 11–17 December 2023 (Group A); 14–20 January 2024 (Group B)
- Teams: 12

The 2024 World Junior Ice Hockey Championship Division II were a pair of international ice hockey tournaments organized by the International Ice Hockey Federation. It consists of two tiered groups of six teams each: the fourth-tier Division II A and the fifth-tier Division II B. For each tier's tournament, the team which will place first will be promoted to the next higher division, while the team which place last will be relegated to a lower division.

To be eligible as a junior player in these tournaments, a player can't be born earlier than 2004.

== Division II A ==
2024 IIHF U20 World Championship Division II A

Tournament details
- Host country: Great Britain
- City: Dumfries
- Venue: 1 (in 1 host city)
- Dates: 11–17 December 2023
- Teams: 6

Tournament statistics
- Games played: 15
- Goals scored: 108 (7.2 per game)
- Attendance: 4,934 (329 per game)
- Scoring leader: (South Korea) Kim Si-hwan (14 points)

Official website
- www.iihf.com

The Division II A tournament was played in Dumfries, United Kingdom, from 11 to 17 December 2023.

=== Participants ===
Team	Qualification
South Korea	placed 6th in Division I B last year and were relegated
Great Britain	hosts; placed 2nd in Division II A last year
Lithuania	placed 3rd in Division II A last year
Spain	placed 4th in Division II A last year
Netherlands	placed 5th in Division II A last year
China	placed 1st in Division II B last year and were promoted

=== Standings ===
Pos	Team	Pld	W	OTW	OTL	L	GF	GA	GD	Pts	Promotion or relegation
1	South Korea	5	5	0	0	0	29	10	+19	15	Promoted to the 2025 Division I B
2	Lithuania	5	3	1	0	1	27	13	+14	11	
3	Great Britain (H)	5	3	0	1	1	21	12	+9	10	
4	China	5	1	0	0	4	13	20	−7	3 (Note: China 3 Pts +2 GD, Netherlands 3 Pts +1 GD, Spain 3 Pts –3 GD)	
5	Netherlands	5	1	0	0	4	10	25	−15	3	
6	Spain	5	1	0	0	4	8	28	−20	3	Relegated to the 2025 Division II B

Source: IIHF
Rules for classification: 1) points; 2) head-to-head points; 3) head-to-head goal difference; 4) head-to-head number of goals scored; 5) result against closest best-ranked team outside tied teams; 6) result against second-best-ranked team outside tied teams; 7) seeding before tournament.
(H) Host

=== Results ===
11 December 2023; 13:00	Lithuania	1–4 (0–0, 0–2, 1–2)	South Korea	Dumfries Ice Bowl, Dumfries; Attendance: 380

Game reference

Julius Andrekus
Goalies
Seo Kyung-min
Referee:
(Austria) Andreas Huber
Linesmen:
(France) Cyril Debuche
(United Kingdom) Scott Rodger

	0–1	33:28 – Lee M. (Lee J.)
	0–2	34:30 – Kim D. (Kong)
Dumčius (Levcenko, Michalevič) – 40:50	1–2
	1–3	49:06 – Soo (Kong)
	1–4	58:31 – Kim B. (Kim Si., Huh) (ENG)

6 min
Penalties
8 min
38
Shots
39

11 December 2023; 16:30	China	5–1 (4–0, 0–0, 1–1)	Spain	Dumfries Ice Bowl, Dumfries; Attendance: 203

Game reference

Chen Shifeng
Goalies
Roberto Mampel
Pablo Salvador
Referee:
(Slovenia) Bostjan Groznik
Linesmen:
(South Korea) Choi Do-yeon
(Italy) Daniel Rigoni

Hu (Li Zhichen, Li Zhihao) – 00:24	1–0
Xu – 07:38	2–0
Li Zhichen (Li Zhihao, Liu) (PP) – 09:46	3–0
Liu (Hu) – 19:35	4–0
	4–1	44:12 – Garkusha (Cantabrana, Tello) (PP)
Li Zhihao (K. Chen) – 45:03	5–1

12 min
Penalties
10 min
31
Shots
54

11 December 2023; 20:00	Great Britain	4–1 (3–1, 0–0, 1–0)	Netherlands	Dumfries Ice Bowl, Dumfries; Attendance: 511

Game reference

Benjamin Norton
Goalies
Sam Luitwieler
Referee:
(United States) Logan Gruhl
Linesmen:
(United Kingdom) Ilia Kisil
(Norway) Andreas Vyssios

Beatie (Endicott) (PP) – 01:50	1–0
Hopkins (Chung) (PP) – 03:33	2–0
	2–1	10:24 – Rentmeester (Hooijmans, Noblesse)
Stewart (Shaw, Martelly) – 12:21	3–1
Price (Brown, Bruton) – 50:59	4–1

6 min
Penalties
12 min
54
Shots
9

12 December 2023; 13:00	South Korea	9–2 (1–1, 4–1, 4–0)	Spain	Dumfries Ice Bowl, Dumfries; Attendance: 260

Game reference

Seo Kyung-min
Park Jin-hyeok
Goalies
Pablo Salvador
Referee:
(Australia) Robert Love
Linesmen:
(France) Cyril Dubuche
(Italy) Daniel Rigoni

Huh (Kim Si., Lee M.) (PP) – 05:42	1–0
	1–1	09:17 – Casaus (Paya)
Hong (Kim Si., Huh) – 25:31	2–1
Lee J. (Lee D.) – 27:50	3–1
Soo (Kong) – 29:53	4–1
	4–2	31:27 – Cantabrana (Pérez, Collado)
Lee J. (Lee M.) – 32:25	5–2
Kim Si. (Huh, Kong) (PP) – 46:05	6–2
Choi (Lee M., Yang) – 47:36	7–2
Kim D. (Soo, Lee H.) – 48:35	8–2
Huh (Kim Si., Kim B.) – 50:18	9–2

8 min
Penalties
8 min
42
Shots
25

12 December 2023; 16:30	Netherlands	4–2 (1–0, 1–2, 2–0)	China	Dumfries Ice Bowl, Dumfries; Attendance: 106

Game reference

Sam Luitwieler
Goalies
Chen Shifeng
Referee:
(Austria) Andreas Huber
Linesmen:
(South Korea) Choi Do-yeon
(Canada) Anthony Lapointe

Roodenburg (Korotchenko) – 00:07	1–0
Arts (Roodenburg) (PP) – 21:25	2–0
	2–1	24:23 – Li Zhichen
	2–2	34:02 – Xu (Song, K. Chen) (PP)
Speel (Van Mourik) – 54:28	3–2
Speel (ENG) – 59:27	4–2

10 min
Penalties
8 min
29
Shots
46

12 December 2023; 20:00	Great Britain	4–5 OT (0–1, 3–1, 1–2) (OT: 0–1)	Lithuania	Dumfries Ice Bowl, Dumfries; Attendance: 541

Game reference

Benjamin Norton
Goalies
Julius Andrekus
Daniil Cepov
Referee:
(Slovenia) Bostjan Groznik
Linesmen:
(United Kingdom) Scott Rodger
(Norway) Andreas Vyssios

	0–1	19:09 – Belicenka (Ignatavičius, Dedinas) (PP)
Hopkins (Stewart, Shaw) – 20:51	1–1
	1–2	21:49 – Fediukin (Sedleckij-Razin)
Hopkins (Hamill, Norton) – 23:29	2–2
Endicott (Stewart, Bradon) (PP) – 34:08	3–2
Endicott – 48:15	4–2
	4–3	49:23 – Dedinas
	4–4	58:08 – Michalevič (Seniut) (PP, EA)
	4–5	64:14 – Seniut (Grybauskas)

8 min
Penalties
6 min
23
Shots
52

14 December 2023; 13:00	Lithuania	6–1 (2–0, 3–1, 1–0)	Spain	Dumfries Ice Bowl, Dumfries; Attendance: 189

Game reference

Daniil Cepov
Goalies
Roberto Mampel
Referee:
(Australia) Robert Love-Dekazos
Linesmen:
(South Korea) Choi Do-yeon
(United Kingdom) Ilia Kisil

Grybauskas (Dumčius, Michalevič) – 12:37	1–0
Dedinas (Baltrunas) (SH) – 19:48	2–0
Baltrunas (Dedinas, Cizas) – 29:15	3–0
Dumčius (Grybauskas, Valivonis) – 29:50	4–0
Jukna (Ignatavičius, Čečekovas) – 31:34	5–0
	5–1	35:54 – Collado (Valles, Paya)
Baltrunas (Čečekovas, Zeynalov) – 48:00	6–1

10 min
Penalties
16 min
69
Shots
24

14 December 2023; 16:30	South Korea	7–1 (2–1, 4–0, 1–0)	Netherlands	Dumfries Ice Bowl, Dumfries; Attendance: 96

Game reference

Seo Kyung-min
Park Jin-hyeok
Goalies
Danylo Douma
Referee:
(Slovenia) Bostjan Groznik
Linesmen:
(Italy) Daniel Rigoni
(United Kingdom) Scott Rodger

Lee M. (Yang) – 04:25	1–0
Huh (Kong, Kim Si.) (PP) – 11:52	2–0
	2–1	12:51 – Van Mourik (Van Stuijvenberg)
Kim B. (Lee M., Lim D.) (SH) – 23:59	3–1
Kong (Kim Si., Lee M.) (PP) – 30:38	4–1
Lee M. (Huh, Kong) (PP) – 32:15	5–1
Kim B. (Huh, Lee M.) – 39:41	6–1
Hong (Kong, Park M.) – 49:25	7–1

8 min
Penalties
16 min
43
Shots
16

14 December 2023; 20:00	Great Britain	4–1 (0–0, 2–0, 2–1)	China	Dumfries Ice Bowl, Dumfries; Attendance: 527

Game reference

Benjamin Norton
Goalies
Chen Shifeng
Referee:
(United States) Logan Gruhl
Linesmen:
(France) Cyril Debuche
(Canada) Anthony Lapointe

Brown (Price) – 24:31	1–0
Bradon (Stewart, Hopkins) (PP) – 37:40	2–0
	2–1	44:05 – Liu (K. Chen, Hu) (PP2)
Brown – 48:48	3–1
Car. Hamill (Hopkins, Stewart) – 58:43	4–1

16 min
Penalties
12 min
49
Shots
30

15 December 2023; 13:00	Netherlands	2–9 (1–2, 1–3, 0–4)	Lithuania	Dumfries Ice Bowl, Dumfries

Game reference

Sam Luitwieler
Goalies
Julius Andrekus
Referee:
(Australia) Robert Love-Dekazos
Linesmen:
(South Korea) Choi Do-yeon
(Norway) Andreas Vyssios

Van Mourik (Roodenburg) – 09:13	1–0
	1–1	11:54 – Grybauskas (Seniut, Belicenka)
	1–2	14:56 – Michalevič (Grybauskas, Dumčius)
Van Belkom – 20:47	2–2
	2–3	25:40 – Grybauskas (Michalevič, Dumčius)
	2–4	30:04 – Fediukin (Valivonis), Čečekovas)
	2–5	38:46 – Levcenko (Jevstignejev, Kovalenko)
	2–6	42:49 – Fediukin (Kovalenko, Belicenka) (PP)
	2–7	49:34 – Baltrunas (Fediukin, Čečekovas)
	2–8	53:26 – Baltrunas (Kovalenko, Jevstignejev) (PP)
	2–9	54:09 – Zeynalov (Jevstignejev, Fediukin)

8 min
Penalties
6 min
14
Shots
69

15 December 2023; 16:30	China	3–5 (0–1, 2–3, 1–1)	South Korea	Dumfries Ice Bowl, Dumfries; Attendance: 178

Game reference

Chen Shifeng
Goalies
Seo Kyung-min
Referee:
(United States) Logan Gruhl
Linesmen:
(United Kingdom) Ilia Kisil
(Canada) Anthony Lapointe

	0-1	06:29 – Kim Si. (Huh) (PP)
	0–2	22:21 – Yang
Jia (Tong) – 23:30	1–2
	1–3	29:27 – Huh (Kong) (PP)
	1–4	30:55 – Huh (Kim Si., Lim)
K. Chen – 34:01	2–4
	2–5	47:51 – Kim B. (Kim Si., Huh)
Luan – 52:02	3–5

12 min
Penalties
10 min
14
Shots
63

15 December 2023; 20:00	Spain	1–6 (0–2, 1–2, 0–2)	Great Britain	Dumfries Ice Bowl, Dumfries; Attendance: 610

Game reference

Roberto Mampel
Goalies
Benjamin Norton
Alexander Oldale
Referee:
(Austria) Andreas Huber
Linesmen:
(France) Cyril Debuche
(Italy) Daniel Rigoni

	0–1	00:40 – Car. Hamill (Stewart)
	0–2	07:17 – Hopkins (Stewart, Beatie) (SH)
Collado (Cantabrana) (PP) – 29:31	1–2
	1–3	34:14 – Beatie (Hazeldine, Car. Hamill) (PP)
	1–4	36:33 – Brown (Beatie) (PP)
	1–5	55:34 – Car. Hamill (Hopkins)
	1–6	58:02 – Hopkins (A. Osborn) (SH)

14 min
Penalties
16 min
39
Shots
35

17 December 2023; 13:00	Spain	3–2 (1–0, 1–0, 1–2)	Netherlands	Dumfries Ice Bowl, Dumfries; Attendance: 205

Game reference

Pablo Salvador
Goalies
Danylo Douma
Referee:
(Slovenia) Bostjan Groznik
Linesmen:
(Canada) Anthony Lapointe
(Norway) Andreas Vyssios

Blanco (Hernando) – 13:59	1–0
Cantabrana (Pérez) – 35:29	2–0
Mata (Badorrey) – 45:15	3–0
	3–1	48:05 – Filppini (PP)
	3–2	51:09 – Van Wingerder (Kolgren)

8 min
Penalties
12 min
48
Shots
29

17 December 2023; 16:30	South Korea	4–3 (1–1, 0–2, 3–0)	Great Britain	Dumfries Ice Bowl, Dumfries; Attendance: 859

Game reference

Seo Kyrng-min
Goalies
Benjamin Norton
Referee:
(United States) Logan Gruhl
Linesmen:
(United Kingdom) Ilia Kisil
(Italy) Daniel Rigoni

Kim Si. – 13:01	1–0
	1–1	17:47 – Beatie (Hazeldine, Hopkins) (PP)
	1–2	22:18 – Hopkins (Hazeldine, Stewart)
	1–3	25:19 – D. Osborn, A. Osborn)
Kim Si. – 44:52	2–3
Kong (Kim Si.) (PP) – 54:27	3–3
Kim Si. (Kong) (ENG) – 59:10	4–3

8 min
Penalties
8 min
44
Shots
33

17 December 2023; 20:00	Lithuania	6–2 (3–1, 2–1, 1–0)	China	Dumfries Ice Bowl, Dumfries; Attendance: 269

Game reference

Daniil Cepov
Goalies
Chen Shifeng
Gao Peng
Referee:
(Austria) Andreas Huber
Linesmen:
(France) Cyril Debuche
(United Kingdom) Scott Rodger

Jukna (Ignatavičius, Dedinas) – 06:25	1–0
	1–1	08:53 – Jia (Xu) (PP)
Dedinas (Ignatavičius, Zeynalov) – 13:52	2–1
Čečekovas (Belicenka, Dumčius) – 14:56	3–1
	3–2	23:05 – Zhang (Ma)
Grybauskas (Dumčius, Levcenko) (PP) – 34:21	4–2
Jevstignejev (Sedleckij-Razin, Fediukin) – 35:04	5–2
Čečekovas (Belicenka, Dumčius) – 59:03	6–2

12 min
Penalties
12 min
68
Shots
30

=== Statistics ===
==== Top 10 scorers ====
Pos	Player	Country	GP	G	A	Pts	+/–	PIM
1	Kim Si-hwan	South Korea	5	5	9	14	+10	4
2	Huh Min-joon	South Korea	5	5	8	13	+6	0
3	Kong Yu-chan	South Korea	5	2	9	11	+7	4
4	Jack Hopkins	Great Britain	5	6	4	10	+8	2
5	Lee Moo-young	South Korea	5	3	6	9	+5	4
6	Marijus Dumčius	Lithuania	5	2	6	8	+2	10
7	Mackenzie Stewart	Great Britain	5	1	7	8	+6	8
8	Paulius Grybauskas	Lithuania	5	4	3	7	+1	2
9	Linas Dedinas	Lithuania	5	3	3	6	+3	4
9	Vitalij Fediukin	Lithuania	5	3	3	6	+4	0

GP = Games played; G = Goals; A = Assists; Pts = Points; +/− = P Plus–minus; PIM = Penalties In Minutes
Source: IIHF

==== Goaltending leaders ====
(minimum 40% team's total ice time)

Pos	Player	Country	TOI	GA	Sv%	GAA	SO
1	Benjamin Norton	Great Britain	300:43	11	93.45	2.19	0
2	Daniil Cepov	Lithuania	125:00	4	93.10	1.92	0
3	Chen Shifeng	China	281:48	18	92.86	3.83	0
4	Seo Kyung-min	South Korea	271:16	10	91.45	2.21	0
5	Sam Luitwieler	Netherlands	180:00	15	91.12	5.00	0

TOI = Time on ice (minutes:seconds); GA = Goals against; GAA = Goals against average; Sv% = Save percentage; SO = Shutouts
Source: IIHF

==== Best Players Selected by the Directorate ====
- Goaltender: (United Kingdom) Benjamin Norton
- Defenceman: (Lithuania) Artur Seniut
- Forward: (South Korea) Huh Min-joon

Source: IIHF

== Division II B ==
2024 IIHF U20 World Championship Division II B

Tournament details
- Host country: Serbia
- City: Belgrade
- Venue: 1 (in 1 host city)
- Dates: 14–20 January 2024
- Teams: 6

Tournament statistics
- Games played: 15
- Goals scored: 91 (6.07 per game)
- Attendance: 2,633 (176 per game)
- Scoring leader: (Serbia) Minja Ivanović (10 points)

Official website
- www.iihf.com

The Division II Group B tournament was played in Belgrade, Serbia, from 14 to 20 January 2024.

=== Participants ===
Team	Qualification
Romania	placed 6th in Division II A last year and were relegated
Belgium	placed 2nd in Division II B last year
Serbia	hosts; placed 3rd in Division II B last year
Iceland	placed 4th in Division II B last year
Chinese Taipei	placed 5th in Division II B last year
Australia	placed 1st in Division III last year and were promoted

=== Standings ===
Pos	Team	Pld	W	OTW	OTL	L	GF	GA	GD	Pts	Promotion or relegation
1	Romania	5	4	1	0	0	25	5	+20	14	Promoted to the 2025 Division II A
2	Serbia (H)	5	4	0	1	0	21	5	+16	13	
3	Iceland	5	3	0	0	2	21	14	+7	9	
4	Australia	5	2	0	0	3	9	16	−7	6	
5	Belgium	5	1	0	0	4	7	17	−10	3	
6	Chinese Taipei	5	0	0	0	5	8	34	−26	0	Relegated to the 2025 Division III A

Source: IIHF.com
Rules for classification: 1) points; 2) head-to-head points; 3) head-to-head goal difference; 4) head-to-head number of goals scored; 5) result against closest best-ranked team outside tied teams; 6) result against second-best-ranked team outside tied teams; 7) seeding before tournament.
(H) Host

=== Results ===
14 January 2024; 12:30	Belgium	3–1 (1–0, 1–1, 1–0)	Chinese Taipei	Pionir Ice Hall, Belgrade; Attendance: 27

Game reference
Stijn Raeymaekers	Goalies	Kao Hao-hsuan
35	Shots	35

14 January 2024; 16:00	Australia	0–6 (0–2, 0–3, 0–1)	Iceland	Pionir Ice Hall, Belgrade; Attendance: 36

Game reference
Matúš Trnka	Goalies	Helgi Ivarsson
25	Shots	32

14 January 2024; 19:30	Serbia	2–3 GWS (2–0, 0–1, 0–1) (0–0, 0–1)	Romania	Pionir Ice Hall, Belgrade; Attendance: 327

Game reference
Filip Korenić	Goalies	Nandor Biro
22	Shots	33

15 January 2024; 12:30	Chinese Taipei	1–4 (0–1, 1–3, 0–0)	Australia	Pionir Ice Hall, Belgrade; Attendance: 36

Game reference
24	Shots	40

15 January 2024; 16:00	Romania	2–1 (0–0, 0–1, 2–0)	Iceland	Pionir Ice Hall, Belgrade; Attendance: 19

Game reference
33	Shots	21

15 January 2024; 19:30	Belgium	0–4 (0–1, 0–2, 0–1)	Serbia	Pionir Ice Hall, Belgrade; Attendance: 426

Game reference
31	Shots	36

17 January 2024; 12:30	Belgium	1–4 (0–1, 0–1, 1–2)	Australia	Pionir Ice Hall, Belgrade; Attendance: 34

Game reference
27	Shots	29

17 January 2024; 16:00	Romania	12–1 (2–1, 7–0, 3–0)	Chinese Taipei	Pionir Ice Hall, Belgrade; Attendance: 29

Game reference
58	Shots	10

17 January 2024; 19:30	Serbia	5–1 (2–0, 3–1, 0–0)	Iceland	Pionir Ice Hall, Belgrade; Attendance: 623

Game reference
42	Shots	22

18 January 2024; 12:30	Australia	1–4 (0–0, 0–2, 1–2)	Romania	Pionir Ice Hall, Belgrade

Game reference
25	Shots	32

18 January 2024; 16:00	Iceland	4–3 (1–1, 1–2, 2–0)	Belgium	Pionir Ice Hall, Belgrade; Attendance: 31

Game reference
26	Shots	37

18 January 2024; 19:30	Chinese Taipei	1–6 (0–1, 1–4, 0–1)	Serbia	Pionir Ice Hall, Belgrade; Attendance: 368

Game reference
26	Shots	45

20 January 2024; 12:30	Romania	4–0 (1–0, 1–0, 2–0)	Belgium	Pionir Ice Hall, Belgrade; Attendance: 42

Game reference
31	Shots	17

20 January 2024; 16:00	Iceland	9–4 (4–1, 1–3, 4–0)	Chinese Taipei	Pionir Ice Hall, Belgrade; Attendance: 32

Game reference
55	Shots	24

20 January 2024; 19:30	Serbia	4–0 (3–0, 0–0, 1–0)	Australia	Pionir Ice Hall, Belgrade; Attendance: 576

Game reference
34	Shots	17

=== Statistics ===
==== Top 10 scorers ====
Pos	Player	Country	GP	G	A	Pts	+/–	PIM
1	Minja Ivanović	Serbia	5	6	4	10	+9	12
2	Csongor Antal	Romania	5	6	3	9	+5	6
3	Arnar Kristjánsson	Iceland	5	2	7	9	+7	2
4	Alex Sveinsson	Iceland	5	4	4	8	+6	6
5	Viggó Hlynsson	Iceland	5	3	5	8	+5	8
6	Petar Šimić	Serbia	5	3	4	7	+5	4
7	Petar Pećerić	Serbia	4	1	6	7	+5	8
8	Ákos Nyisztor	Romania	4	5	1	6	+6	2
9	Níels Hafsteinsson	Iceland	5	3	3	6	+1	4
10	Matija Dinić	Serbia	5	1	5	6	+3	4

GP = Games played; G = Goals; A = Assists; Pts = Points; +/− = P Plus–minus; PIM = Penalties In Minutes
Source: IIHF

==== Goaltending leaders ====
(minimum 40% team's total ice time)

Pos	Player	Country	TOI	GA	Sv%	GAA	SO
1	Filip Korenić	Serbia	251:55	3	97.22	0.71	2
2	Nándor Bíró	Romania	183:21	4	94.12	1.31	0
3	Helgi Ívarsson	Iceland	217:57	10	91.87	2.75	1
4	Stijn Raeymaekers	Belgium	238:18	13	89.68	3.27	0
5	Matúš Trnka	Australia	285:20	16	89.04	3.36	0

TOI = Time on ice (minutes:seconds); GA = Goals against; GAA = Goals against average; Sv% = Save percentage; SO = Shutouts
Source: IIHF

==== Best Players Selected by the Directorate ====
- Goaltender: (Serbia) Filip Korenić
- Defenceman: (Iceland) Arnar Kristjánsson
- Forward: (Romania) Csongor Antal

Source: IIHF
