= 2025 World Junior Ice Hockey Championships – Division II =

International youth ice hockey tournament

2025 IIHF U20 World Championship Division II
Tournament details
- Host countries: Croatia; Serbia
- Venues: 2 (in 2 host cities)
- Dates: 6–12 and 19–25 January 2025
- Teams: 12

The 2025 World Junior Ice Hockey Championship Division II consisted of two international under-20 ice hockey tournaments organized by the International Ice Hockey Federation. Division II A represents the fourth tier and Division II B the fifth tier of the IIHF World Junior Championship. For each tier's tournament, the first-placed team was promoted to the next higher division, while the bottom-placed team was relegated to a lower division.

To be eligible as a junior player in these tournaments, a player couldn't be born earlier than 2005.

== Division II A ==
2025 IIHF U20 World Championship Division II A

Tournament details
- Host country: Croatia
- City: Zagreb
- Venue: 1 (in 1 host city)
- Dates: 6–12 January 2025
- Teams: 6

Tournament statistics
- Games played: 15
- Goals scored: 115 (7.67 per game)
- Attendance: 2,697 (180 per game)
- Scoring leader: (Lithuania) Simas Ignatavičius (14 points)

Official website
- www.iihf.com

The Division II A tournament was played in Zagreb, Croatia, from 6 to 12 January 2025.

=== Participating teams ===
| Team | Qualification |
|---|---|
| Croatia (hosts) | placed 6th in Division I B last year and were relegated |
| Lithuania | placed 2nd in Division II A last year |
| Great Britain | placed 3rd in Division II A last year |
| China | placed 4th in Division II A last year |
| Netherlands | placed 5th in Division II A last year |
| Romania | placed 1st in Division II B last year and were promoted |

=== Standings ===
| Pos | Team | Pld | W | OTW | OTL | L | GF | GA | GD | Pts | Promotion or relegation |
|---|---|---|---|---|---|---|---|---|---|---|---|
| 1 | Lithuania | 5 | 5 | 0 | 0 | 0 | 39 | 5 | +34 | 15 | Promotion to the 2026 Division I B |
| 2 | Romania | 5 | 3 | 0 | 0 | 2 | 16 | 15 | +1 | 9 (Note: Romania 6–4 Croatia) | |
| 3 | Croatia (H) | 5 | 3 | 0 | 0 | 2 | 22 | 26 | −4 | 9 | |
| 4 | Great Britain | 5 | 2 | 0 | 0 | 3 | 11 | 15 | −4 | 6 (Note: Great Britain 4–3 China) | |
| 5 | China | 5 | 2 | 0 | 0 | 3 | 18 | 24 | −6 | 6 | |
| 6 | Netherlands | 5 | 0 | 0 | 0 | 5 | 9 | 30 | −21 | 0 | Relegation to the 2026 Division II B |

Source: IIHF
Rules for classification: 1) points; 2) head-to-head points; 3) head-to-head goal difference; 4) head-to-head number of goals scored; 5) result against closest best-ranked team outside tied teams; 6) result against second-best-ranked team outside tied teams; 7) seeding before tournament.
(H) Host

=== Results ===
All times are local (Central European Time – UTC+1).

| 6 January 2025; 12:30 | Lithuania | 8–2 (3–1, 3–0, 2–1) | Netherlands | Admiral Ice Dome, Zagreb; Attendance: 52 |

Game reference

Daniil Cepov
Goalies
Sam Luitwieler
Referee:
(United States) Samuel Heidemann
Linesmen:
(Croatia) Tomislav Grozaj
(Romania) Áron Magyar

| | 0–1 | 02:55 – van Mourik (Wendijk, Andringa) |
| Šulinskas (Krakauskas) – 10:53 | 1–1 |
| Baltrūnas (Škadauskas, Krakaukas) (PP) – 12:46 | 2–1 |
| Škadauskas (Pranskevičius) – 13:18 | 3–1 |
| Škadauskas (Ignatavičius) – 22:07 | 4–1 |
| Pranskevičius (Sadauskas) – 29:52 | 5–1 |
| Ignatavičius (Pranskevičius) – 37:35 | 6–1 |
| Ignatavičius (Šulinskas) – 42:35 | 7–1 |
| Škadauskas (Andrejauskas, Krakauskas) (PP) – 50:09 | 8–1 |
| | 8–2 | 52:23 – Pothoven (Bax-Kristiansen) |

10 min
Penalties
8 min
48
Shots
18

| 6 January 2025; 16:00 | Romania | 3–4 (1–1, 1–1, 1–2) | China | Admiral Ice Dome, Zagreb; Attendance: 38 |

Game reference

Márton Buda
Goalies
Zhang Youyi
Referee:
(South Korea) Chae Young-jin
Linesmen:
(Croatia) Marko Šaković
(Poland) Michał Żak

| Bogács (Fehér, Szopos-Böjte) – 06:01 | 1–0 |
| | 1–1 | 17:39 – Meng |
| | 1–2 | 29:16 – Sun (Lyu, Luan) |
| Márton (Szabó, E. Kovács) – 30:56 | 2–2 |
| | 2–3 | 42:13 – Luan (Lyu) |
| Kozma (Timaru) – 45:04 | 3–3 |
| | 3–4 | 57:26 – Meng (Xu, Luan) |

4 min
Penalties
10 min
24
Shots
22

| 6 January 2025; 19:30 | Great Britain | 1–3 (1–0, 0–1, 0–2) | Croatia | Admiral Ice Dome, Zagreb; Attendance: 326 |

Game reference

Alfie Jefferis
Goalies
Nikša Slade
Referee:
(Poland) Krzysztof Kozłowski
Linesmen:
(Germany) Kenneth Englisch
(Ukraine) Oleh Ostroukh

| White-Sey (Kay) (PP) – 19:49 | 1–0 |
| | 1–1 | 28:46 – Kašparek (Mandušić) |
| | 1–2 | 51:32 – Završki (Bodiroga) (PP) |
| | 1–3 | 56:40 – Bodiroga |

12 min
Penalties
2 min
30
Shots
47

| 7 January 2025; 12:30 | Netherlands | 2–5 (1–2, 1–1, 0–2) | Romania | Admiral Ice Dome, Zagreb; Attendance: 42 |

Game reference

Thijs Kivits
Goalies
Márton Buda
Referee:
(Italy) Omar Pinie
Linesmen:
(Germany) Kenneth Englisch
(Poland) Michał Żak

| | 0–1 | 01:09 – Nagy (Bogács, Feher) |
| | 0–2 | 01:56 – B. Süveg (I. Süveg) |
| Kapitonov (van Mourik, Wendijk) – 09:09 | 1–2 |
| | 1–3 | 22:27 – Bogács (Szopos-Bojte) |
| Andringa (Meerakker, Castronovo) (PP) – 24:49 | 2–3 |
| | 2–4 | 50:38 – Szabó (Timaru, Nechita) (PP) |
| | 2–5 | 58:09 – E. Kovács (EN) |

20 min
Penalties
10 min
20
Shots
44

| 7 January 2025; 16:00 | Lithuania | 6–1 (0–1, 4–0, 2–0) | Great Britain | Admiral Ice Dome, Zagreb; Attendance: 54 |

Game reference

Julius Andrekus
Goalies
Alfie Jefferis
Alfie Blakeley
Referee:
(United States) Samuel Heidemann
Linesmen:
(Austria) Sebastian Bedynek
(Croatia) Tomislav Grozaj

| | 0–1 | 08:25 – Lynch (Bradon) |
| Jukna (Ignatavičius, Šulinskas) – 24:28 | 1–1 |
| Kovalenko (Ignatavičius, Pranskevičius) (PP) – 30:02 | 2–1 |
| Zeynalov (Škadauskas, Čečekovas) (PP) – 35:37 | 3–1 |
| Ignatavičius (Pranskevičius, Kovalenko) (PP) – 38:28 | 4–1 |
| Ignatavičius (Jukna, Boravski) – 49:15 | 5–1 |
| Jukna (Kovalenko, Valivonis) – 49:35 | 6–1 |

33 min
Penalties
20 min
42
Shots
15

| 7 January 2025; 19:30 | Croatia | 7–4 (3–1, 3–2, 1–1) | China | Admiral Ice Dome, Zagreb; Attendance: 156 |

Game reference

Nikša Slade
Goalies
Zhang Youyi
Sun Xi
Referee:
(Ukraine) Anton Peretyatko
Linesmen:
(Romania) Áron Magyar
(Ukraine) Oleh Ostroukh

| Bodiroga (Svjetličić, Varga) – 11:28 | 1–0 |
| H. Zovko (Završki, Bodiroga) (PP) – 13:06 | 2–0 |
| Svjetličić (B. Zovko, Slovinac) – 14:26 | 3–0 |
| | 3–1 | 15:25 – Tian (SH) |
| Završki (PP) – 24:37 | 4–1 |
| H. Zovko (Završki, Bodiroga) (PP) – 32:29 | 5–1 |
| | 5–2 | 32:41 – Xu (Jiang, Luan) |
| Idžan (Kurjaković) – 36:58 | 6–2 |
| | 6–3 | 39:55 – Huang (Tian, Zhao Z.) |
| | 6–4 | 53:58 – Li (Tian, Huang) |
| H. Zovko (EN) – 58:19 | 7–4 |

8 min
Penalties
12 min
35
Shots
28

| 9 January 2025; 12:30 | Great Britain | 4–3 (1–1, 1–1, 2–1) | China | Admiral Ice Dome, Zagreb; Attendance: 64 |

Game reference

Alfie Jefferis
Goalies
Zhang Youyi
Referee:
(South Korea) Chae Young-jin
Linesmen:
(Germany) Kenneth Englisch
(Croatia) Tomislav Grozaj

| | 0–1 | 01:41 – Zhou (Gao, Huang) (PP) |
| Capps (Kay, Bradon) (PP) – 18:03 | 1–1 |
| Shaw (Thorpe, Lipsey) – 20:41 | 2–1 |
| | 2–2 | 38:03 – Jiang (Xu) |
| | 2–3 | 44:44 – Luan (Lyu, Li) |
| Lyne (Bradon, Kay) (PP) – 49:01 | 3–3 |
| Clarke (Knaggs) – 53:04 | 4–3 |

8 min
Penalties
8 min
31
Shots
16

| 9 January 2025; 16:00 | Lithuania | 4–0 (1–0, 2–0, 1–0) | Romania | Admiral Ice Dome, Zagreb; Attendance: 55 |

Game reference

Daniil Cepov
Goalies
Balint Mark
Referee:
(Ukraine) Anton Peretyatko
Linesmen:
(Ukraine) Oleh Ostroukh
(Croatia) Marko Šaković

| Kovalenko (Baltrūnas, Čečekovas) – 09:15 | 1–0 |
| Boravski, (Pranskevičius) – 30:57 | 2–0 |
| Boravski (Ignatavičius) – 33:37 | 3–0 |
| Pranskevičius (Ignatavičius, Kovalenko) (PP) – 51:24 | 4–0 |

14 min
Penalties
45 min
58
Shots
9

| 9 January 2025; 19:30 | Croatia | 7–2 (3–1, 3–0, 1–1) | Netherlands | Admiral Ice Dome, Zagreb; Attendance: 235 |

Game reference

Nikša Slade
Goalies
Sam Luitwieler
Thijs Kivits
Referee:
(Italy) Omar Pinie
Linesmen:
(Austria) Sebastian Bedynek
(Poland) Michał Żak

| Završki (H. Zovko, Slovinac) – 00:26 | 1–0 |
| | 1–1 | 04:18 – van Mourik (Kapitonov, Bax-Kristiansen) |
| H. Zovko (Kašparek) – 04:39 | 2–1 |
| Idžan (Mandušić, Slovinac) – 15:00 | 3–1 |
| Savić – 28:25 | 4–1 |
| Završki (Slovinac, Savic) (PP) – 32:08 | 5–1 |
| H. Zovko (Kurjaković, Jagatić) – 34:59 | 6–1 |
| | 6–2 | 49:53 – van Mourik (Wendijk, Kapitonov) |
| Slovinac (Filipović, Marojević) – 55:22 | 7–2 |

14 min
Penalties
8 min
30
Shots
29

| 10 January 2025; 12:30 | China | 1–8 (1–2, 0–4, 0–2) | Lithuania | Admiral Ice Dome, Zagreb; Attendance: 58 |

Game reference

Sun Xi
Goalies
Julius Andrekus
Referee:
(Poland) Krzysztof Kozłowski
Linesmen:
(Austria) Sebastian Bedynek
(Romania) Áron Magyar

| | 0–1 | 10:21 – Šulinskas (Ignatavičius, Jukna) |
| | 0–2 | 10:51 – Pranskevičius (Škadauskas, Sadauskas) |
| Tian (Huang) – 11:49 | 1–2 |
| | 1–3 | 21:13 – Ignatavičius (Jukna) (SH) |
| | 1–4 | 24:01 – Ignatavičius (Škadauskas) |
| | 1–5 | 24:40 – Ignatavičius (Simbelis, Zeynalov) |
| | 1–6 | 28:27 – Pranskevičius (Jukna) (PP) |
| | 1–7 | 41:35 – Škadauskas (Pranskevičius, Zeynalov) |
| | 1–8 | 45:25 – Andrejaukaus (Šulinskas) (SH) |

6 min
Penalties
14 min
22
Shots
65

| 10 January 2025; 16:00 | Netherlands | 1–4 (0–0, 1–3, 0–1) | Great Britain | Admiral Ice Dome, Zagreb; Attendance: 87 |

Game reference

Thijs Kivits
Goalies
Alfie Jefferis
Referee:
(Ukraine) Anton Peretyatko
Linesmen:
(Ukraine) Oleh Ostroukh
(Croatia) Marko Sakovic

| Wendijk (Mittendorff, Castronovo) – 29:40 | 1–0 |
| | 1–1 | 31:52 – White-Sey (Kay, Bradon) (PP) |
| | 1–2 | 35:26 – Capps (Kay) (PP) |
| | 1–3 | 36:03 – Clarke (Carruth) |
| | 1–4 | 51:22 – Bradon |

12 min
Penalties
6 min
12
Shots
47

| 10 January 2025; 19:30 | Romania | 6–4 (0–4, 1–0, 5–0) | Croatia | Admiral Ice Dome, Zagreb; Attendance: 620 |

Game reference

Balint Mark
Márton Buda
Goalies
Nikša Slade
Referee:
(Italy) Omar Pinie
Linesmen:
(Germany) Kenneth Englisch
(Poland) Michał Żak

| | 0–1 | 07:58 – Bodiroga (Završki, H. Zovko) (PP) |
| | 0–2 | 11:50 – B. Zovko (Bodiroga, Vukadin) |
| | 0–3 | 16:33 – Alić |
| | 0–4 | 18:15 – H. Zovko (Bodiroga, Vukadin) (PP) |
| Kozma (Szekeres, B. Süveg) – 26:05 | 1–4 |
| S. Kovács – 50:22 | 2–4 |
| S. Kovács (A. Kovács) (PP) – 52:39 | 3–4 |
| Timaru (Nechita, Szopos-Bojte) – 54:23 | 4–4 |
| Salamon (S. Kovács) – 58:25 | 5–4 |
| Bogács (EN) – 59:39 | 6–4 |

14 min
Penalties
12 min
34
Shots
28

| 12 January 2025; 12:30 | Great Britain | 1–2 (0–2, 1–0, 0–0) | Romania | Admiral Ice Dome, Zagreb; Attendance: 75 |

Game reference

Alfie Jefferis
Goalies
Márton Buda
Referee:
(South Korea) Chae Young-jin
Linesmen:
(Croatia) Tomislav Grozaj
(Croatia) Marko Šaković

| | 0–1 | 03:31 – A. Kovács (Ágoston, E. Kovács) (PP) |
| | 0–2 | 13:17 – S. Kovács (E. Kovács) |
| Carruth (Capps, Bradon) (PP) – 39:12 | 1–2 |

59 min
Penalties
10 min
20
Shots
31

| 12 January 2025; 16:00 | China | 6–2 (3–0, 1–2, 2–0) | Netherlands | Admiral Ice Dome, Zagreb; Attendance: 35 |

Game reference

Zhang Youyi
Goalies
Thijs Kivits
Sam Luitwieler
Referee:
(Poland) Krzysztof Kozłowski
Linesmen:
(Romania) Áron Magyar
(Poland) Michał Żak

| Lyu (Jiang, Xu) (PP) – 12:24 | 1–0 |
| Luan (Wen) – 15:29 | 2–0 |
| Tian (Jiang, Huang) – 19:43 | 3–0 |
| Zhou Z. (Lyu) – 25:19 | 4–0 |
| | 4–1 | 31:33 – Van de Meerakker (Muizer) (PP) |
| | 4–2 | 34:58 – Muizer (Noblesse, Versantvoort) |
| Zhou Z. (Lyu, Luan) – 42:07 | 5–2 |
| Tian (Meng) (EN) – 54:49 | 6–2 |

6 min
Penalties
6 min
26
Shots
39

| 12 January 2025; 19:30 | Croatia | 1–13 (0–2, 0–6, 1–5) | Lithuania | Admiral Ice Dome, Zagreb; Attendance: 800 |

Game reference

Nikša Slade
Goalies
Julius Andrekus
Referee:
(United States) Samuel Heidemann
Linesmen:
(Austria) Sebastian Bedynek
(Germany) Kenneth Englisch

| | 0–1 | 08:06 – Ignatavičius (Šulinskas) |
| | 0–2 | 12:20 – Škadauskas |
| | 0–3 | 24:57 – Čečekovas (Baltrūnas) |
| | 0–4 | 26:45 – Škadauskas (Valivonis, Zeynalov) (PP) |
| | 0–5 | 27:13 – Sobolev (Boravski) |
| | 0–6 | 30:01 – Šulinskas (Boravski, Zeynalov) |
| | 0–7 | 38:14 – Zeynalov (Baltrūnas, Simbelis) |
| | 0–8 | 39:01 – Valivonis (PP) |
| Filipović (Kašparek, H. Zovko) – 40:51 | 1–8 |
| | 1–9 | 45:36 – Škadauskas (Valivonis, Sadauskas) |
| | 1–10 | 51:08 – Baltrūnas (Čečekovas, Andrejauskas) (PP) |
| | 1–11 | 52:02 – Jukna |
| | 1–12 | 53:27 – Sadauskas (Škadauskas, Boravski) |
| | 1–13 | 55:36 – Olienikas (Kovalenko) (PP) |

10 min
Penalties
2 min
10
Shots
55

=== Statistics ===
==== Top 10 scorers ====
| Pos | Player | Country | GP | G | A | Pts | +/– | PIM |
|---|---|---|---|---|---|---|---|---|
| 1 | Simas Ignatavičius | Lithuania | 5 | 8 | 6 | 14 | +13 | 4 |
| 2 | Mykolas Škadauskas | Lithuania | 5 | 7 | 5 | 12 | +11 | 8 |
| 3 | Pijus Pranskevičius | Lithuania | 5 | 4 | 6 | 10 | +10 | 0 |
| 4 | Hrvoje Zovko | Croatia | 5 | 6 | 3 | 9 | –1 | 4 |
| 5 | Luka Bodiroga | Croatia | 5 | 3 | 5 | 8 | +2 | 6 |
| 6 | Fran Završki | Croatia | 5 | 4 | 3 | 7 | –1 | 4 |
| 7 | Deimantas Šulinskas | Lithuania | 4 | 3 | 4 | 7 | +8 | 27 |
| 8 | Dovydas Jukna | Lithuania | 5 | 3 | 4 | 7 | +10 | 0 |
| 8 | Luan Rong | China | 5 | 3 | 4 | 7 | +4 | 2 |
| 10 | Tian Boyu | China | 5 | 4 | 2 | 6 | –2 | 0 |

GP = Games played; G = Goals; A = Assists; Pts = Points; +/− = P Plus–minus; PIM = Penalties In Minutes
Source: IIHF

==== Goaltending leaders ====
(minimum 40% team's total ice time)

| Pos | Player | Country | TOI | GA | Sv% | GAA | SO |
|---|---|---|---|---|---|---|---|
| 1 | Julius Andrekus | Lithuania | 180:00 | 3 | 93.62 | 1.00 | 0 |
| 2 | Daniil Cepov | Lithuania | 120:00 | 2 | 92.59 | 1.00 | 1 |
| 3 | Márton Buda | Romania | 218:45 | 7 | 90.79 | 1.92 | 0 |
| 4 | Thijs Kivits | Netherlands | 137:36 | 10 | 90.38 | 4.36 | 0 |
| 5 | Alfie Jefferis | Great Britain | 286:12 | 15 | 89.66 | 3.14 | 0 |

TOI = Time on ice (minutes:seconds); GA = Goals against; GAA = Goals against average; Sv% = Save percentage; SO = Shutouts
Source: IIHF

==== Best Players Selected by the Directorate ====
- Goaltender: (Lithuania) Julius Andrekus
- Defenceman: (Croatia) Lovro Slovinac
- Forward: (Lithuania) Simas Ignatavičius

Source: IIHF

== Division II B ==
2025 IIHF U20 World Championship Division II B

Tournament details
- Host country: Serbia
- City: Belgrade
- Venue: 1 (in 1 host city)
- Dates: 19–25 January 2025
- Teams: 6

Tournament statistics
- Games played: 15
- Goals scored: 98 (6.53 per game)
- Attendance: 4,045 (270 per game)
- Scoring leader: (Israel) Mike Levin (11 points)

Official website
- www.iihf.com

The Division II B tournament was played in Belgrade, Serbia, from 19 to 25 January 2025.

=== Participating teams ===
| Team | Qualification |
|---|---|
| Spain | placed 6th in Division II A last year and were relegated |
| Serbia (hosts) | placed 2nd in Division II B last year |
| Iceland | placed 3rd in Division II B last year |
| Australia | placed 4th in Division II B last year |
| Belgium | placed 5th in Division II B last year |
| Israel | placed 1st in Division III A last year and were promoted |

=== Standings ===
| Pos | Team | Pld | W | OTW | OTL | L | GF | GA | GD | Pts | Promotion or relegation |
|---|---|---|---|---|---|---|---|---|---|---|---|
| 1 | Spain | 5 | 4 | 0 | 1 | 0 | 18 | 9 | +9 | 13 | Promotion to the 2026 Division II A |
| 2 | Israel | 5 | 3 | 0 | 0 | 2 | 18 | 19 | −1 | 9 | |
| 3 | Serbia (H) | 5 | 2 | 1 | 0 | 2 | 18 | 13 | +5 | 8 | |
| 4 | Australia | 5 | 2 | 0 | 0 | 3 | 18 | 19 | −1 | 6 (Note: Iceland 4–5 Australia) | |
| 5 | Iceland | 5 | 2 | 0 | 0 | 3 | 16 | 14 | +2 | 6 | |
| 6 | Belgium | 5 | 1 | 0 | 0 | 4 | 10 | 24 | −14 | 3 | Relegation to the 2026 Division III A |

Source: IIHF
Rules for classification: 1) points; 2) head-to-head points; 3) head-to-head goal difference; 4) head-to-head number of goals scored; 5) result against closest best-ranked team outside tied teams; 6) result against second-best-ranked team outside tied teams; 7) seeding before tournament.
(H) Host

=== Results ===
All times are local (Central European Time – UTC+1).

| 19 January 2025; 12:30 | Israel | 5–2 (0–1, 2–0, 3–1) | Australia | Pionir Ice Hall, Belgrade; Attendance: 46 |

Game reference

David Verkhovsky
Goalies
Tom Forrest
Referee:
(Croatia) Trpimir Piragic
Linesmen:
(China) Chi Hongda
(Serbia) Matija Nikolic

| | 0–1 | 14:03 – Maybee (Kuleshov, Suchler) (PP) |
| Goldshtein (Ougortsin, Zitserman) (PP) – 31:50 | 1–1 |
| Goldshtein (Levin) – 35:13 | 2–1 |
| | 2–2 | 43:03 – Maybee (Hughes, West) |
| Levin – 50:53 | 3–2 |
| Levin (PP) – 57:27 | 4–2 |
| Rigler (Levin, Aharonovich) (EN) – 59:42 | 5–2 |

14 min
Penalties
14 min
31
Shots
15

| 19 January 2025; 16:00 | Iceland | 0–2 (0–0, 0–1, 0–1) | Spain | Pionir Ice Hall, Belgrade; Attendance: 53 |

Game reference
| Þórir Aspar | Goalies | Pablo Salvador | Referee: (Belgium) Chris van Grinsven; Linesmen: (United Kingdom) Ilia Kisil (Serbia) Uros Mladenovic |
| 0–1 / 39:34 – González (Sanz, Fernández); 0–2 / 50:46 – Collado (Cabello) | | | Referee: (Belgium) Chris van Grinsven; Linesmen: (United Kingdom) Ilia Kisil (Serbia) Uros Mladenovic |
| 29 min | Penalties | 4 min | Referee: (Belgium) Chris van Grinsven; Linesmen: (United Kingdom) Ilia Kisil (Serbia) Uros Mladenovic |
| 13 | Shots | 30 | Referee: (Belgium) Chris van Grinsven; Linesmen: (United Kingdom) Ilia Kisil (Serbia) Uros Mladenovic |

| 19 January 2025; 19:30 | Serbia | 2–4 (1–0, 1–1, 0–3) | Belgium | Pionir Ice Hall, Belgrade; Attendance: 726 |

Game reference

Filip Korenić
Goalies
Tibe Palinckx
Referees:
(Lithuania) Benas Jaksys
(Slovenia) Gregor Režek
Linesmen:
(Croatia) Krešimir Polašek
(Netherlands) Brian Van Rijzewijk

| Šaranović – 12:33 | 1–0 |
| Popović (Mladenović, Ivanović) – 27:25 | 2–0 |
| | 2–1 | 29:28 – Delport (Gentry) |
| | 2–2 | 43:15 – van Bruyssel (Gentry, Blomme) (PP) |
| | 2–3 | 51:54 – Delport |
| | 2–4 | 59:55 – Gentry (Levecque) (EN) |

6 min
Penalties
6 min
29
Shots
24

| 20 January 2025; 12:30 | Spain | 4–2 (1–0, 0–1, 3–1) | Australia | Pionir Ice Hall, Belgrade; Attendance: 32 |

Game reference

Enrique Mampel
Goalies
Tom Forrest
Referee:
(Slovenia) Gregor Režek
Linesmen:
(Serbia) Matija Nikolic
(Lithuania) Artyom Sidorov

| Cantabrana (Collado, Pérez) (PP) – 18:50 | 1–0 |
| | 1–1 | 21:37 – Kuleshov (Gordon) |
| García – 55:54 | 2–1 |
| González (García) – 58:54 | 3–1 |
| | 3–2 | 59:10 – Kuleshov (Friederich, O'Handley) (EA) |
| Collado (EN) – 59:27 | 4–2 |

10 min
Penalties
8 min
28
Shots
17

| 20 January 2025; 16:00 | Belgium | 3–5 (2–2, 1–2, 0–1) | Israel | Pionir Ice Hall, Belgrade; Attendance: 42 |

Game reference

Tibe Palinckx
Goalies
David Verkhovsky
Referee:
(Netherlands) Jeroen Klijberg
Linesmen:
(Serbia) Uros Mladenovic
(Netherlands) Brian Van Rijzewijk

| Gentry (Delport) (PP) – 09:11 | 1–0 |
| Gentry (Blomme, van Bruyssel) (PP) – 11:06 | 2–0 |
| | 2–1 | 14:37 – Goldshtein (Levin, Kreimerman) (PP) |
| | 2–2 | 15:41 – Kerner (Sigalov) |
| | 2–3 | 24:11 – Levin (Goldshtein, Zitserman) |
| | 2–4 | 28:59 – Rigler (Sigalov) |
| Delport (Blomme, van Bruyssel) – 37:09 | 3–4 |
| | 3–5 | 56:03 – Zitserman |

33 min
Penalties
10 min
20
Shots
43

| 20 January 2025; 19:30 | Serbia | 2–3 (1–1, 0–2, 1–0) | Iceland | Pionir Ice Hall, Belgrade; Attendance: 674 |

Game reference

Lazar Ilić
Filip Korenić
Goalies
Þórir Aspar
Referee:
(Belgium) Chris van Grinsven
Linesmen:
(China) Chi Hongda
(Croatia) Krešimir Polašek

| | 0–1 | 04:05 – H. Karvelsson (A. Kristjánsson) |
| Opalić (S. Pećerić, P. Pećerić) – 05:13 | 1–1 |
| | 1–2 | 25:31 – Einisson (A. Kristjánsson) (PP) |
| | 1–3 | 39:45 – H. Karvelsson (Hrolfsson) |
| Mladenović (Popović) – 40:52 | 2–3 |

2 min
Penalties
10 min
55
Shots
13

| 22 January 2025; 12:30 | Spain | 2–0 (0–0, 2–0, 0–0) | Belgium | Pionir Ice Hall, Belgrade; Attendance: 53 |

Game reference
| Pablo Salvador | Goalies | Tibe Palinckx | Referee: (Lithuania) Benas Jaksys; Linesmen: (Serbia) Uros Mladenovic (Croatia) Krešimir Polašek |
| Cortes (Badorrey) (SH) – 28:02 / 1–0; Cantabrana (Pérez, González) – 32:47 / 2–0 | | | Referee: (Lithuania) Benas Jaksys; Linesmen: (Serbia) Uros Mladenovic (Croatia) Krešimir Polašek |
| 6 min | Penalties | 4 min | Referee: (Lithuania) Benas Jaksys; Linesmen: (Serbia) Uros Mladenovic (Croatia) Krešimir Polašek |
| 35 | Shots | 12 | Referee: (Lithuania) Benas Jaksys; Linesmen: (Serbia) Uros Mladenovic (Croatia) Krešimir Polašek |

| 22 January 2025; 16:00 | Iceland | 4–5 (3–1, 1–0, 0–4) | Australia | Pionir Ice Hall, Belgrade; Attendance: 37 |

Game reference

Þórir Aspar
Goalies
Marcus Henderson
Tom Forrest
Referees:
(Netherlands) Jeroen Klijberg
(Croatia) Trpimir Piragic
Linesmen:
(Serbia) Matija Nikolic
(Netherlands) Brian Van Rijzewijk

| Steinsen (H. Karvelsson, Jóhannsson) (PP) – 03:50 | 1–0 |
| H. Karvelsson (A. Karvelsson) – 07:40 | 2–0 |
| | 2–1 | 10:45 – Sucher (Costa, Maybee) (PP) |
| Björgvinsson (Blöndal) – 18:40 | 3–1 |
| Bjarnason (Sigvaldason) – 39:45 | 4–1 |
| | 4–2 | 46:10 – Sucher (Gordon, Bartlett) |
| | 4–3 | 51:20 – Friederich (Costa, Kuleshov) (PP) |
| | 4–4 | 51:49 – Gordon (Friederich, Kuleshov) |
| | 4–5 | 53:01 – Maybee (Sucher) (PP) |

14 min
Penalties
4 min
23
Shots
47

| 22 January 2025; 19:30 | Serbia | 5–2 (1–0, 1–1, 3–1) | Israel | Pionir Ice Hall, Belgrade; Attendance: 764 |

Game reference

Filip Korenić
Goalies
David Verkhovskiy
Referee:
(Slovenia) Gregor Režek
Linesmen:
(United Kingdom) Ilia Kisil
(Lithuania) Artyom Sidorov

| Popović (Vitorac) – 06:22 | 1–0 |
| | 1–1 | 22:43 – Aharonovich (Goldshtein, Levin) (PP) |
| Opalić (Matović) – 31:26 | 2–1 |
| | 2–2 | 44:01 – Levin (Goldshtein) |
| Martinović (Popović) – 49:07 | 3–2 |
| Opalić (P. Pećerić) – 49:42 | 4–2 |
| Mladenović (Martinović, Ivanović) – 59:02 | 5–2 |

6 min
Penalties
10 min
39
Shots
21

| 23 January 2025; 12:30 | Belgium | 2–7 (0–2, 2–3, 0–2) | Iceland | Pionir Ice Hall, Belgrade; Attendance: 23 |

Game reference

Tibe Palinckx
Goalies
Þórir Aspar
Referee:
(Lithuania) Benas Jaksys
Linesmen:
(Serbia) Matija Nikolic
(Lithuania) Artyom Sidorov

| | 0–1 | 11:29 – Blöndal (Björgvinsson, Einisson) |
| | 0–2 | 12:00 – H. Karvelsson (Hrolfsson) |
| | 0–3 | 26:14 – Einisson (A. Kristjánsson, Blöndal) |
| Raciborski (Laeremans, Schoovaerts) – 27:09 | 1–3 |
| | 1–4 | 29:25 – A. Karvelsson (A. Kristjánsson) |
| Gentry – 32:03 | 2–4 |
| | 2–5 | 38:52 – A. Karvelsson (A. Kristjánsson) |
| | 2–6 | 46:37 – Einisson (Björgvinsson, Mojzyszek) |
| | 2–7 | 48:46 – A. Kristjánsson (Björgvinsson) (PP) |

4 min
Penalties
4 min
34
Shots
31

| 23 January 2025; 16:00 | Israel | 3–7 (1–3, 1–1, 1–3) | Spain | Pionir Ice Hall, Belgrade; Attendance: 76 |

Game reference

Alon Shpinel
Goalies
Pablo Salvador
Referees:
(Netherlands) Jeroen Klijberg
(Belgium) Chris van Grinsven
Linesmen:
(China) Chi Hongda
(Netherlands) Brian Van Rijzewijk

| | 0–1 | 08:00 – Mazón (Cabello, Collado) |
| Levin (Goldshtein) (SH) – 12:23 | 1–1 |
| | 1–2 | 12:56 – González (García, Segura) (PP) |
| | 1–3 | 19:52 – Cabello (Sanz) (SH) |
| Levin (Goldshtein, Ougortsin) (PP) – 27:08 | 2–3 |
| | 2–4 | 33:07 – Blanco (Cantabrana, Pérez) (PP) |
| Zitserman (Sigalov) (PP) – 40:33 | 3–4 |
| | 3–5 | 50:17 – Acuña (Cortes, Segura) |
| | 3–6 | 55:19 – González (Collado, Cantabrana) |
| | 3–7 | 59:12 – Pérez (Collado, González) |

10 min
Penalties
10 min
26
Shots
47

| 23 January 2025; 19:30 | Australia | 1–5 (0–0, 0–3, 1–2) | Serbia | Pionir Ice Hall, Belgrade; Attendance: 714 |

Game reference

Tom Forrest
Goalies
Filip Korenić
Referee:
(Croatia) Trpimir Piragic
Linesmen:
(United Kingdom) Ilia Kisil
(Croatia) Krešimir Polašek

| | 0–1 | 26:08 – Martinović (S. Pećerić, Mladenović) |
| | 0–2 | 28:25 – Ivanović (P. Pećerić, Mladenović) (PP) |
| | 0–3 | 38:23 – Martinovic (Opalić, S. Pećerić) (PP) |
| Gordon (Friederich) – 41:33 | 1–3 |
| | 1–4 | 51:13 – Mladenović (Šaranović, Matović) |
| | 1–5 | 58:39 – P. Pećerić (EN) |

10 min
Penalties
10 min
21
Shots
25

| 25 January 2025; 12:30 | Iceland | 2–3 (1–1, 1–1, 0–1) | Israel | Pionir Ice Hall, Belgrade; Attendance: 29 |

Game reference

Þórir Aspar
Goalies
David Verkhovsky
Referees:
(Croatia) Trpimir Piragic
(Belgium) Chris van Grinsven
Linesmen:
(Serbia) Matija Nikolic
(Netherlands) Brian Van Rijzewijk

| | 0–1 | 11:23 – Rigler (Kerner) |
| A. Kristjánsson (Björgvinsson) (PP2) – 14:28 | 1–1 |
| | 1–2 | 31:22 – Kerner (Charniak) |
| H. Karvelsson – 37:16 | 2–2 |
| | 2–3 | 42:46 – Levin (Goldshtein) |

16 min
Penalties
20 min
27
Shots
35

| 25 January 2025; 16:00 | Australia | 8–1 (2–1, 4–0, 2–0) | Belgium | Pionir Ice Hall, Belgrade; Attendance: 34 |

Game reference

Tom Forrest
Goalies
Tibe Palinckx
Referees:
(Lithuania) Benas Jaksys
(Slovenia) Gregor Režek
Linesmen:
(China) Chi Hongda
(Serbia) Uros Mladenovic

| | 0–1 | 06:48 – Poitras (Hendrix, Paulissen |
| Maybee (Reader) – 07:34 | 1–1 |
| Kuleshov – 17:46 | 2–1 |
| Garas (York, Koudelka – 21:40 | 3–1 |
| Sucher – 23:49 | 4–1 |
| Sucher (Maybee) – 27:22 | 5–1 |
| Kuleshov (Reader, Forrest) – 34:54 | 6–1 |
| Maybee (Sucher, Friederich) (PP) – 47:34 | 7–1 |
| Kuleshov (O'Handley, Friederich) – 59:15 | 8–1 |

0 min
Penalties
6 min
32
Shots
32

| 25 January 2025; 19:30 | Spain | 3–4 GWS (2–1, 1–0, 0–2) (OT: 0–0) (SO: 0–2) | Serbia | Pionir Ice Hall, Belgrade; Attendance: 742 |

Game reference

Enrique Mampel
Goalies
Filip Korenić
Referees:
(Netherlands) Jeroen Klijberg
(Belgium) Chris van Grinsven
Linesmen:
(United Kingdom) Ilia Kisil
(Lithuania) Artyom Sidorov

| Blanco (Acuña) – 12:14 | 1–0 |
| Mazón (Vilar Cabello, Sanz) – 16:37 | 2–0 |
| | 2–1 | 18:58 – Popović (S. Pećerić) |
| Pérez (Cantabrana, González) – 23:55 | 3–1 |
| | 3–2 | 40:24 – Martinović (Mladenović, Opalić) |
| | 3–3 | 41:46 – Popović |

González (miss)
Pérez (miss)
Cantabrana (miss)
García (miss)
Shootout
Popović
(miss) Mladenović
Ivanović
(miss) Martinovic
6 min
Penalties
2 min
38
Shots
36

=== Statistics ===
==== Top 10 scorers ====
| Pos | Player | Country | GP | G | A | Pts | +/– | PIM |
|---|---|---|---|---|---|---|---|---|
| 1 | Mike Levin | Israel | 5 | 7 | 4 | 11 | +3 | 16 |
| 2 | Samson Goldshtein | Israel | 5 | 3 | 6 | 9 | +2 | 6 |
| 3 | Ivan Kuleshov | Australia | 5 | 5 | 3 | 8 | 0 | 4 |
| 4 | Brayden Maybee | Australia | 5 | 5 | 2 | 7 | +3 | 2 |
| 5 | Eduardo González | Spain | 5 | 4 | 3 | 7 | +4 | 6 |
| 5 | Lachlan Sucher | Australia | 5 | 4 | 3 | 7 | −1 | 6 |
| 7 | Kosta Mladenović | Serbia | 5 | 3 | 4 | 7 | +4 | 4 |
| 8 | Arnar Kristjánsson | Iceland | 5 | 2 | 5 | 7 | +3 | 4 |
| 9 | Haukur Karvelsson | Iceland | 5 | 5 | 1 | 6 | +3 | 0 |
| 10 | Tobi Gentry | Belgium | 5 | 4 | 2 | 6 | −6 | 0 |
| 10 | Andreja Popović | Serbia | 5 | 4 | 2 | 6 | +4 | 0 |

GP = Games played; G = Goals; A = Assists; Pts = Points; +/− = P Plus–minus; PIM = Penalties In Minutes
Source: IIHF

==== Goaltending leaders ====
(minimum 40% team's total ice time)

| Pos | Player | Country | TOI | GA | Sv% | GAA | SO |
|---|---|---|---|---|---|---|---|
| 1 | Pablo Salvador | Spain | 180:00 | 3 | 94.12 | 1.00 | 2 |
| 2 | Þórir Aspar | Iceland | 296:45 | 14 | 93.03 | 2.83 | 0 |
| 3 | Filip Korenić | Serbia | 256:11 | 9 | 91.35 | 2.08 | 0 |
| 4 | Enrique Mampel | Spain | 240:00 | 5 | 90.38 | 2.40 | 0 |
| 5 | Tom Forrest | Australia | 240:00 | 13 | 89.60 | 2.82 | 0 |

TOI = Time on ice (minutes:seconds); GA = Goals against; GAA = Goals against average; Sv% = Save percentage; SO = Shutouts
Source: IIHF

==== Best Players Selected by the Directorate ====
- Goaltender: (Spain) Pablo Salvador
- Defenceman: (Spain) Bosco Collado
- Forward: (Israel) Samson Goldshtein

Source: IIHF
