= Simas Ignatavičius =

Lithuanian-American ice hockey player (born 2007)

- Born: 22 October 2007 (age 18) Memphis, Tennessee, U.S.
- Height: 6 ft 3 in (191 cm)
- Weight: 198 lb (90 kg; 14 st 2 lb)
- Position: Forward
- Shoots: Right
- NL team: Genève-Servette HC
- NHL draft: 40th overall, 2026; Florida Panthers
- Playing career: 2025–present

Simas Ignatavičius (born 22 October 2007) is a Lithuanian-American professional ice hockey player who is a forward for Genève-Servette HC of the National League (NL). He was selected 40th overall by the Florida Panthers in the 2026 NHL entry draft. With this selection, he became only the third Lithuanian player ever drafted into the NHL, joining Darius Kasparaitis and Dainius Zubrus.

== Career ==
Born in Memphis, Tennessee, United States, he was raised in Lithuania. Ignatavičius moved to Switzerland at 12 years old to pursue his ice hockey career. He joined the Genève-Servette HC main roster for the 2025–26 season, where he recorded nine goals and seven assists in 63 matches. In his debut season, he was named the National League's Rookie of the Year.

== International play ==
He represented Lithuania's under-18 team at age 14 and made his senior team debut in 2026.

== Personal life ==
Ignatavičius's father, Mantas Ignatavičius, played professional basketball in various European countries, and his mother, Rita, was a high-level handball player. Ignatavičius is fluent in four languages – Lithuanian, English, French, and Russian.

Ignatavičius holds dual citizenship of the United States and Lithuania.
